= Cincinnati Bearcats football statistical leaders =

The Cincinnati Bearcats football statistical leaders are individual statistical leaders of the Cincinnati Bearcats football program in various categories, including passing, rushing, receiving, total offense, all-purpose yardage, defensive stats, and kicking. Within those areas, the lists identify single-game, single-season, and career leaders. As of the upcoming 2023 season, the Bearcats represent the University of Cincinnati in the NCAA Division I FBS Big 12 Conference.

Although Cincinnati began competing in intercollegiate football in 1885, the school's official record book considers the "modern era" to have begun in 1950s. Records from before this year are often incomplete and inconsistent, and they are generally not included in these lists.

These lists are dominated by more recent players for several reasons:

- Since 1950s, seasons have increased from 10 games to 11 and then 12 games in length.
- The NCAA didn't allow freshmen to play varsity football until 1972 (with the exception of the World War II years), allowing players to have four-year careers.
- Bowl games only began counting toward single-season and career statistics in 2002. The Bearcats have played in 14 bowl games since then, giving many recent players an extra game to accumulate statistics.
- The American Athletic Conference, in which Cincinnati played from 2013 to 2022, has held a championship game since 2015. The Bearcats played in that game three times (2019, 2020, 2021), giving players in those seasons yet another game to accumulate statistics. However, the 2020 team only played 10 regularly scheduled games instead of the normal 12 due to COVID-19 constraints.
- Due to COVID-19 issues, the NCAA ruled that the 2020 season would not count against any football player's athletic eligibility, giving all who played in that season the opportunity for five years of eligibility instead of the normal four.

These lists are updated through the 2025 regular season.

== Passing ==
=== Passing yards ===
Career
Rank	Player	Yards	Years
1	Gino Guidugli	11,453	2001 2002 2003 2004
2	Desmond Ridder	10,239	2018 2019 2020 2021
3	Gunner Kiel	6,835	2014 2015 2016
4	Danny McCoin	6,801	1984 1985 1986 1987
5	Hayden Moore	6,518	2015 2016 2017 2018
6	Zach Collaros	6,278	2008 2009 2010 2011
7	Deontey Kenner	6,278	1997 1998 1999 2000
8	Brendan Sorsby	5,613	2024 2025
9	Tony Pike	5,018	2007 2008 2009
10	Greg Cook	4,906	1966 1967 1968

Single season
Rank	Player	Yards	Year
1	Gino Guidugli	3,543	2002
2	Desmond Ridder	3,334	2021
3	Greg Cook	3,272	1968
4	Gunner Kiel	3,254	2014
5	Ben Mauk	3,121	2007
	Brendon Kay	3,121	2013
7	Zach Collaros	2,902	2010
8	Danny McCoin	2,831	1986
9	Brendan Sorsby	2,813	2024
10	Brendan Sorsby	2,800	2025

Single game
Rank	Player	Yards	Year	Opponent
1	Hayden Moore	557	2015	Memphis
2	Greg Cook	554	1968	Ohio
3	Gunner Kiel	523	2015	Houston
4	Zach Collaros	480	2009	Connecticut
5	Zach Collaros	463	2010	South Florida
6	Gunner Kiel	436	2014	East Carolina
7	Ben Mauk	431	2007	Syracuse
8	Gunner Kiel	427	2015	Temple
9	Brendan Sorsby	426	2024	Texas Tech
10	Gunner Kiel	418	2014	Toledo

=== Passing touchdowns ===
Career
Rank	Player	TDs	Years
1	Desmond Ridder	87	2018 2019 2020 2021
2	Gino Guidugli	78	2001 2002 2003 2004
3	Gunner Kiel	56	2014 2015 2016
4	Zach Collaros	51	2008 2009 2010 2011
5	Tony Pike	49	2007 2008 2009
6	Brendan Sorsby	45	2024 2025
7	Danny McCoin	39	1984 1985 1986 1987
8	Gene Rossi	37	1949 1950 1951 1952
9	Greg Cook	34	1966 1967 1968
10	Brendon Kay	32	2009 2010 2011 2012 2013

Single season
Rank	Player	TDs	Year
1	Ben Mauk	31	2007
	Gunner Kiel	31	2014
3	Desmond Ridder	30	2021
4	Tony Pike	29	2009
5	Brendan Sorsby	27	2025
6	Gino Guidugli	26	2004
	Zach Collaros	26	2010
8	Greg Cook	25	1968
9	Gino Guidugli	22	2002
	Brendon Kay	22	2013

Single game
Rank	Player	TDs	Year	Opponent
1	Tony Pike	6	2009	Illinois
	Gunner Kiel	6	2014	Toledo
3	Gino Guidugli	5	2004	Southern Miss
	Zach Collaros	5	2010	Louisville
	Gunner Kiel	5	2015	Central Florida
	Emory Jones	5	2023	Eastern Kentucky
	Brendan Sorsby	5	2025	Northwestern State

== Rushing ==
=== Rushing yards ===
Career
Rank	Player	Yards	Years
1	Reggie Taylor	4,242	1983 1984 1985 1986
2	DeMarco McCleskey	3,487	1998 2000 2001 2002
3	Isaiah Pead	3,288	2008 2009 2010 2011
4	Allen Harvin	2,998	1978 1979 1980 1981 1982
5	David Small	2,963	1991 1992 1993
6	Michael Warren II	2,918	2017 2018 2019
7	Robert Cooper	2,788	1996 1997 1998 1999
8	James Bettis	2,675	1978 1979 1980 1981
9	Mike Boone	2,250	2014 2015 2016 2017
10	Al McKinney	2,237	1985 1986 1987 1988

Single season
Rank	Player	Yards	Year
1	DeMarco McCleskey	1,361	2002
2	George Winn	1,334	2012
3	Michael Warren II	1,329	2018
4	Reggie Taylor	1,325	1986
5	Jerome Ford	1,319	2021
6	Allen Harvin	1,283	1978
7	Michael Warren II	1,265	2019
8	Isaiah Pead	1,259	2011
9	Robert Cooper	1,245	1999
10	James Bettis	1,226	1981

Single game
Rank	Player	Yards	Year	Opponent
1	Bob Hynes	306	1923	Case Western Reserve
2	Daryl Royal	282	1996	Miami (Ohio)
3	Clem Turner	267	1966	Kansas State
4	Steve Cowan	266	1970	Ohio
5	Reggie Taylor	259	1986	Miami (Ohio)
6	Richard Hall	238	2004	Miami (Ohio)
7	DeMarco McCleskey	234	1998	East Carolina
8	David Small	233	1992	Kent State
9	David Small	219	1991	Middle Tennessee State
10	Isaiah Pead	213	2010	Rutgers

=== Rushing touchdowns ===
Career
Rank	Player	TDs	Years
1	DeMarco McCleskey	39	1998 2000 2001 2002
2	Michael Warren II	34	2017 2018 2019
3	David Small	31	1991 1992 1993
4	Desmond Ridder	28	2018 2019 2020 2021
5	Isaiah Pead	27	2008 2009 2010 2011
	Jerome Ford	27 (Note: Ford began his college career at Alabama in 2018, transferring to Cincinnati after the 2019 season and receiving a waiver of then-current NCAA rules that would have forced him to sit out the 2020 season.)	2020 2021
7	Reggie Harrison	25	1971 1972 1973
8	Reggie Taylor	24	1983 1984 1985 1986
	Mike Boone	24	2014 2015 2016 2017
10	Bob Heuck	22	1910 1911 1912

Single season
Rank	Player	TDs	Year
1	Michael Warren II	19	2018
	Jerome Ford	19	2021
3	David Small	17	1993
4	DeMarco McCleskey	15	2002
5	Michael Warren II	14	2019
6	Al Nelson	13	1964
	George Winn	13	2012
8	Isaiah Pead	12	2011
	Desmond Ridder	12	2020
10	Joe Miller	11	1954
	Reggie Harrison	11	1972
	Tony Kapetanis	11	1979
	Reggie Taylor	11	1986
	DeMarco McCleskey	11	1998

Single game
Rank	Player	TDs	Year	Opponent
1	Ike Stewart	6	1912	Transylvania
	Bob Heuck	6	1912	Transylvania
3	David Small	4	1992	Kent State
	David Small	4	1993	Houston
	DeMarco McCleskey	4	1998	Arkansas State
	DeMarco McCleskey	4	1998	Houston
	Isaiah Pead	4	2010	Rutgers
	Jerome Ford	4	2021	UCF

== Receiving ==
=== Receptions ===
Career
Rank	Player	Rec	Years
1	Shaq Washington	240	2011 2012 2013 2014
2	LaDaris Vann	215	1999 2000 2001 2002
3	Dominick Goodman	204	2005 2006 2007 2008
	Mardy Gilyard	204	2005 2007 2008 2009
5	Anthony McClung	177	2010 2011 2012 2013
6	Kahlil Lewis	168	2015 2016 2017 2018
7	D. J. Woods	159	2008 2009 2010 2011
8	Armon Binns	138	2007 2008 2009 2010
9	Tye Keith	135	1999 2000 2001 2002
10	Marcus Barnett	127	2007 2008 2009 2010

Single season
Rank	Player	Rec	Year
1	Shaq Washington	90	2015
2	Mardy Gilyard	87	2009
3	Dominick Goodman	84	2008
4	LaDaris Vann	81	2001
	Mardy Gilyard	81	2008
6	Tom Rossley	80	1968
7	Armon Binns	75	2010
	Shaq Washington	75	2013
9	Anthony McClung	72	2013
10	LaDaris Vann	71	2002

Single game
Rank	Player	Rec	Year	Opponent
1	Shaq Washington	15	2015	East Carolina
2	Tom Rossley	13	1968	Wichita State
	Jon Olinger	13	2002	Miami (Ohio)
4	Zeke Harden	12	1972	North Texas State
	LaDaris Vann	12	2001	Army
	LaDaris Vann	12	2002	Tulane
	Mardy Gilyard	12	2009	Connecticut
	Armon Binns	12	2010	South Florida
	Shaq Washington	12	2014	South Florida
	Kahlil Lewis	12	2018	SMU
	Xzavier Henderson	12	2023	Miami (OH)

=== Receiving yards ===
Career
Rank	Player	Yards	Years
1	Mardy Gilyard	2,962	2005 2007 2008 2009
2	LaDaris Vann	2,703	1999 2000 2001 2002
3	Shaq Washington	2,563	2011 2012 2013 2014 2015
4	Dominick Goodman	2,512	2005 2006 2007 2008
5	Anthony McClung	2,378	2010 2011 2012 2013
6	Chris Moore	2,301	2012 2013 2014 2015
7	Jim O'Brien	2,285	1967 1968 1969
8	D. J. Woods	2,156	2008 2009 2010 2011
9	Kahlil Lewis	2,116	2015 2016 2017 2018
10	Marlon Pearce	2,096	1990 1991 1992

Single season
Rank	Player	Yards	Year
1	Mardy Gilyard	1,276	2008
2	Mardy Gilyard	1,191	2009
3	Jon Olinger	1,114	2002
4	Jim O'Brien	1,107	1968
5	Armon Binns	1,101	2010
6	Tom Rossley	1,072	1968
7	Hannibal Thomas	1,028	2004
	Dominick Goodman	1,028	2008
9	Shaq Washington	982	2015
10	Anthony McClung	908	2013

Single game
Rank	Player	Yards	Year	Opponent
1	Tom Rossley	254	1968	Louisville
2	Jon Olinger	240	2002	Miami (Ohio)
3	Chris Moore	221	2014	Ohio State
4	Jim O'Brien	212	1968	Ohio
5	Marcus Barnett	210	2007	West Virginia
6	Kahlil Lewis	203	2018	East Carolina
7	Jim O'Brien	196	1968	Tampa
8	Jon Olinger	194	2002	East Carolina
9	Marlon Pearce	185	1992	Louisville
	Tyler Scott	185	2022	Indiana

=== Receiving touchdowns ===
Career
Rank	Player	TDs	Years
1	Chris Moore	26	2012 2013 2014 2015
2	Mardy Gilyard	25	2005 2007 2008 2009
3	Dominick Goodman	22	2005 2006 2007 2008
4	Jim O'Brien	21	1967 1968 1969
	Armon Binns	21	2007 2008 2009 2010
	Kahlil Lewis	21	2015 2016 2017 2018
7	Deno Foster	17	1981 1982 1983 1984
	Jason Stargel	17	1982 1983 1984 1986
	Marcus Barnett	17	2007 2008 2009 2010
	Mekale McKay	17	2013 2014 2015

Single season
Rank	Player	TDs	Year
1	Marcus Barnett	13	2007
	Cyrus Allen	13	2025
3	Jim O'Brien	12	1968
4	Mardy Gilyard	11	2008
	Armon Binns	11	2009
	Mardy Gilyard	11	2009
7	Armon Binns	10	2010
8	Jim Kelly	9	1950
	Hannibal Thomas	9	2004
	Chris Moore	9	2013
	Kahlil Lewis	9	2018
	Tyler Scott	9	2022

Single game
Rank	Player	TDs	Year	Opponent
1	Jim O'Brien	3	1968	Tampa
	Deno Foster	3	1983	Louisville
	Jon Olinger	3	2002	East Carolina
	Hannibal Thomas	3	2004	Southern Miss
	Marcus Barnett	3	2007	Syracuse
	Armon Binns	3	2010	Louisville
	Chris Moore	3	2014	Ohio State
	Kahlil Lewis	3	2016	East Carolina
	Tyler Scott	3	2022	Indiana

== Total offense ==
Total offense is the sum of passing and rushing statistics. It does not include receiving or returns.

=== Total offense yards ===
Career
Rank	Player	Yards	Years
1	Desmond Ridder	12,418	2018 2019 2020 2021
2	Gino Guidugli	11,661	2001 2002 2003 2004
3	Zach Collaros	7,087	2008 2009 2010 2011
4	Gunner Kiel	7,000	2014 2015 2016
5	Brendan Sorsby	6,640	2024 2025
6	Deontey Kenner	6,558	1997 1998 1999 2000
7	Danny McCoin	6,210	1984 1985 1986 1987
8	Tony Pike	5,146	2007 2008 2009
9	Lance Harp	4,909	1991 1992 1993
10	Greg Cook	4,760	1966 1967 1968

Single season
Rank	Player	Yards	Year
1	Desmond Ridder	3,699	2021
2	Gino Guidugli	3,570	2002
3	Ben Mauk	3,498	2007
4	Gunner Kiel	3,396	2014
5	Brendan Sorsby	3,380	2025
6	Brendan Sorsby	3,260	2024
7	Greg Cook	3,210	1968
8	Zach Collaros	3,104	2010
9	Desmond Ridder	3,017	2018
10	Desmond Ridder	2,888	2020

Single game
Rank	Player	Yards	Year	Opponent
1	Hayden Moore	564	2015	Memphis
2	Zach Collaros	555	2009	Connecticut
3	Greg Cook	525	1968	Ohio
4	Gunner Kiel	499	2015	Houston
5	Zach Collaros	490	2010	South Florida
6	Brendan Sorsby	478	2024	Texas Tech
7	Gunner Kiel	442	2014	East Carolina
	Gunner Kiel	442	2014	Toledo
9	JC French IV	441	2026	West Virginia
10	Brendan Sorsby	440	2025	Kansas

=== Touchdowns responsible for ===
"Touchdowns responsible for" is the official NCAA term for combined rushing and passing touchdowns. It does not include receiving or returns.

Cincinnati's 2021 record book only lists this statistic from the 2000 season forward. Past editions of its record book did include seasons before 2000.

Career
Rank	Player	TDs	Years
1	Desmond Ridder	115	2018 2019 2020 2021
2	Gino Guidugli	83	2001 2002 2003 2004
3	Zach Collaros	67	2008 2009 2010 2011
4	Brendan Sorsby	63	2024 2025
5	Gunner Kiel	59	2014 2015
6	Tony Pike	52	2007 2008 2009
7	Danny McCoin	49	1984 1985 1986 1987
8	Greg Cook	40	1966 1967 1968
9	Brendon Kay	40	2009 2010 2011 2012 2013
10	Deontey Kenner	39	1997 1998 1999 2000

Single season
Rank	Player	TDs	Year
1	Desmond Ridder	36	2021
	Brendan Sorsby	36	2025
3	Ben Mauk	34	2007
4	Gunner Kiel	32	2014
5	Tony Pike	31	2009
	Desmond Ridder	31	2020
7	Greg Cook	30	1968
	Zach Collaros	30	2010
9	Brendon Kay	28	2013
10	Gino Guidugli	27	2004
	Brendan Sorsby	27	2024

== All-purpose yardage ==
All-purpose yardage is the sum of all yards credited to a player who is in possession of the ball. It includes rushing, receiving, and returns, but does not include passing.

While Cincinnati lists a complete top 10 in all-purpose yardage over all relevant time frames (career, season, game), it does not break down its leaders' performances by type of play.

Career
Rank	Player	Yards	Years
1	Mardy Gilyard	5,862	2005 2007 2008 2009
2	Reggie Taylor	5,322	1983 1984 1985 1986
3	DeMarco McCleskey	4,113	1998 2000 2001 2002
4	Isaiah Pead	4,104	2008 2009 2010 2011
5	Al McKinney	4,038	1985 1986 1987 1988
6	Michael Warren II	3,799	2017 2018 2019
7	Dominick Goodman	3,692	2005 2006 2007 2008
8	Allen Harvin	3,663	1978 1979 1980 1981 1982
9	Mike Boone	3,656	2014 2015 2016 2017
10	Ralph David Abernathy IV	3,643	2011 2012 2013 2014

Single season
Rank	Player	Yards	Year
1	Mardy Gilyard	2,690	2009
2	Mardy Gilyard	2,197	2008
3	D. J. Woods	1,859	2010
4	DeMarco McCleskey	1,729	2002
5	Robert Tate	1,685	1995
6	Isaiah Pead	1,652	2011
7	Reggie Taylor	1,643	1986
8	Roger Stephens	1,572	1947
9	Kahlil Lewis	1,561	2018
	Michael Warren II	1,561	2018

Single game
Rank	Player	Yards	Year	Opponent
1	Mardy Gilyard	381	2009	Pittsburgh
2	Mardy Gilyard	365	2008	Oklahoma
3	Robert Tate	333	1995	Kansas
4	Robert Tate	316	1995	Toledo
5	Bob Hynes	305	1923	Case Tech
6	Mardy Gilyard	303	2009	UConn
7	Clem Turner	294	1966	Kansas State
8	D. J. Woods	291	2010	Rutgers
9	Reggie Taylor	288	1986	Miami (OH)
10	LaDaris Vann	283	1999	East Carolina
	D. J. Woods	283	2010	Oklahoma

== Defense ==
=== Interceptions ===
Career
Rank	Player	Ints	Years
1	Mike Mickens	14	2005 2006 2007 2008
2	Jocelyn Borgella	12	1990 1991 1992 1993
	Blue Adams	12	1998 1999 2000 2001 2002
	DeAngelo Smith	12	2005 2006 2007 2008
5	Ed Bolis	11	1970 1971 1972

Single season
Rank	Player	Ints	Year
1	DeAngelo Smith	8	2007
2	Don Polagyi	6	1952
	Bill Madeya	6	1965
	Ed Bolis	6	1970
	Sam Garnes	6	1995
	Blue Adams	6	2002
	Daven Holly	6	2003
	Mike Mickens	6	2007

Single game
Rank	Player	Ints	Year	Opponent
1	Bob Hynes	4	1923	Ohio Northern

=== Tackles ===
Career
Rank	Player	Tackles	Years
1	Karl Woods	502	1977 1978 1979 1980
2	Phillip Curry	487	1994 1995 1996 1997
3	Brad Jackson	392	1994 1995 1996 1997
4	Mike Brookins	356	1979 1980 1981
5	Alex Gordon	352	1983 1984 1985 1986
6	Hassan Champion	351	1995 1996 1997 1998
	Joe Olding	351	1979 1980 1981 1982
8	Doug Monaghan	338	2001 2002 2003 2004
9	J. K. Schaffer	337	2008 2009 2010 2011
	DeJuan Gossett	327	1997 1998 1999 2000

Single season
Rank	Player	Tackles	Year
1	Mike Brookins	186	1979
2	Brad Jackson	168	1997
3	Karl Woods	161	1980
4	Jerome Brinson	158	1983
5	Karl Woods	155	1978
6	Dwayne Berry	147	1978
7	Muhammed El Mubarak	145	1995
8	Linwood Marshall	143	1983
9	Howie Kurnick	140	1978
10	Antonio Gibson	138	1982
	Phillip Curry	138	1997
	Greg Blair	138	2012

Single game
Rank	Player	Tackles	Year	Opponent
1	Karl Woods	31	1980	South Carolina
2	Vaughn Booker	24	1987	East Carolina
3	Jerome Brinson	23	1987	Oklahoma State
	Brad Jackson	23	1997	Boston College
5	Brad Nothacker	22	1985	Penn State
	Alex Gordon	22	1986	Miami (Ohio)
	Jason Coppess	22	1993	Bowling Green
	Sam Garnes	22	1994	Vanderbilt
9	Mike Kelly	21	1987	Rutgers
	Jack Bruscianelli	21	1989	West Virginia

=== Sacks ===
Career
Rank	Player	Sacks	Years
1	Antwan Peek	27.0	1998 1999 2000 2001 2002
2	Andre Frazier	22.5	2001 2002 2003 2004
3	Anthony Hoke	22.0	2004 2005 2006 2007
4	Derek Wolfe	19.5	2008 2009 2010 2011
5	Trent Cole	18.5	2002 2003 2004
6	George Jamison	18.0	1980 1981 1982 1983
	Nate Dingle	18.0	1990 1991 1992 1993
	Silverberry Mouhon	18.0	2012 2013 2014 2015
9	Terrill Byrd	16.5	2005 2006 2007 2008
10	Andrew Stewart	16.0	1986 1987 1988

Single season
Rank	Player	Sacks	Year
1	Anthony Hoke	13.0	2007
2	Antwan Peek	12.5	2001
3	Connor Barwin	11.0	2008
4	Andrew Stewart	9.0	1987
	Terrell Hartsfield	9.0	2014
6	Derek Wolfe	9.5	2011
7	Ivan Pace Jr.	9.0	2022
8	Antwan Peek	8.5	2000
	Trent Cole	8.5	2004
10	Farley Bell	8.0	1978
	George Jamison	8.0	1982
	Errol Cleveland	8.0	1982
	Terrill Byrd	8.0	2007

Single game
Rank	Player	Sacks	Year	Opponent
1	Antwan Peek	4.0	2001	Louisiana-Monroe
	Alex Daniels	4.0	2009	Miami (Ohio)
3	Trent Cole	3.0	2004	East Carolina
	Anthony Hoke	3.0	2007	Connecticut
	Anthony Hoke	3.0	2007	Syracuse
	Lamonte Nelms	3.0	2007	Syracuse
	Connor Barwin	3.0	2008	Pittsburgh
	Brandon Mills	3.0	2010	Rutgers

== Kicking ==
=== Field goals made ===
Career
Rank	Player	FGs	Years
1	Jonathan Ruffin	62	1999 2000 2001 2002
2	Jacob Rogers	51	2007 2008 2009 2010
3	Eric Richards	41	1994 1995 1996 1997
4	Andrew Gantz	39	2014 2015 2016 2017
5	Steve Schultz	35	1976 1977 1978 1979
6	Tony Miliano	34	2011 2012 2013 2014
7	Kevin Lovell	33	2004 2005 2006
8	Phil Insalaco	28	1986 1987 1988
9	Dan Shepherd	25	1973 1974 1975
10	Tom Dallen	23	1993 1994

Single season
Rank	Player	FGs	Year
1	Jonathan Ruffin	26	2000
2	Andrew Gantz	21	2015
3	Jonathan Ruffin	19	2002
	Ryan Coe	19	2022
5	Kevin Lovell	18	2006
6	Tom Dallen	17	1993
	Tony Miliano	17	2011
	Tony Miliano	17	2012
9	Eric Richards	16	1995
	Jacob Rogers	16	2008
	Andrew Gantz	16	2014

Single game
Rank	Player	FGs	Year	Opponent
1	Ryan Coe	5	2022	SMU
2	Steve Schultz	4	1976	Vanderbilt
	Phil Insalaco	4	1988	Indiana State
	Jonathan Ruffin	4	2000	UAB
	Jonathan Ruffin	4	2000	Tulane
	Jonathan Ruffin	4	2002	Hawai’i
	Chris Manfredini	4	2003	Louisville
	Kevin Lovell	4	2006	Connecticut
	Jacob Rogers	4	2009	Connecticut
	Tony Miliano	4	2011	Pittsburgh
	Andrew Gantz	4	2015	Memphis

=== Field goal percentage ===
Career
Rank	Player	FG%	Years
1	Ryan Coe	82.6%	2022
2	Jonathan Ruffin	78.5%	1999 2000 2001 2002
3	Andrew Gantz	78.0%	2014 2015 2016 2017
4	Nathan Hawks	76.5%	2024
	Stephen Rusnak	76.5%	2025
6	Carter Brown	75.0%	2023 2024
7	David Rowe	73.1%	1990 1991
8	Tony Miliano	72.3%	2011 2012 2013 2014
9	Dan Shepherd	71.4%	1973 1974 1975
10	Kevin Lovell	70.2%	2004 2005 2006

Single season
Rank	Player	FG%	Year
1	Chris Manfredini	90.9%	2003
2	Jonathan Ruffin	89.7%	2000
3	Jonathan Ruffin	86.4%	2002
4	Ryan Coe	82.6%	2022
5	Andrew Gantz	80.0%	2014
6	Carter Brown	78.9%	2023
7	Steve Schultz	78.6%	1978
	Jacob Rogers	78.6%	2010
9	Andrew Gantz	77.8%	2015
10	Stephen Rusnak	76.5%	2025
