= List of Cincinnati Bearcats in the NFL draft =

This is a list of Cincinnati Bearcats football players in the NFL draft.

== Key ==
B	Back	K	Kicker	NT	Nose tackle
C	Center	LB	Linebacker	FB	Fullback
DB	Defensive back	P	Punter	HB	Halfback
DE	Defensive end	QB	Quarterback	WR	Wide receiver
DT	Defensive tackle	RB	Running back	G	Guard
E	End	T	Offensive tackle	TE	Tight end

== Selections ==
Year	Round	Pick	Overall	Player	Team	Position
1940	19	7	177	John Popov	Chicago Bears	B
1943	17	7	157	Nick Skorich	Pittsburgh Steelers	G
1944	5	2	34	Verne Ullom	Brooklyn Dodgers	E
1946	25	4	234	Allen Richards	Chicago Bears	B
1947	6	7	42	Roger Stephens	Chicago Bears	B
1947	7	8	53	Bill Smyth	Los Angeles Rams	T
1947	17	4	149	Elbie Nickel	Pittsburgh Steelers	E
1947	25	7	232	Fred Redeker	Green Bay Packers	B
1947	29	7	272	Dick Lagenbeck	Philadelphia Eagles	T
1948	9	5	70	Mike Graham	Los Angeles Rams	B
1950	20	1	249	Sheldon Dunlap	Baltimore Colts	G
1950	30	1	379	Tom Blake	Baltimore Colts	G
1952	12	6	139	Frank Middendorf	Washington Redskins	C
1952	26	9	310	Dick Kane	San Francisco 49ers	G
1953	5	3	52	Bill Shalosky	Chicago Cardinals	G
1953	11	1	122	Gene Rossi	Baltimore Colts	B
1953	13	11	156	Andy Matto	Los Angeles Rams	T
1953	27	4	317	Jack Delaney	Pittsburgh Steelers	B
1954	12	6	139	Don Fritz	Pittsburgh Steelers	E
1954	20	9	238	Bob Dougherty	Los Angeles Rams	B
1955	10	5	114	Terry Boyle	Pittsburgh Steelers	T
1955	12	11	144	Dick Goist	Detroit Lions	B
1955	28	6	331	Jim Hoffman	Los Angeles Rams	B
1955	29	6	343	Bob Howe	Los Angeles Rams	B
1956	22	4	257	Joe Miller	Philadelphia Eagles	B
1957	22	12	265	Jim Niemann	New York Giants	B
1958	13	12	157	Barry Maroney	Detroit Lions	B
1959	3	10	34	Joe Morrison	New York Giants	B
1959	9	3	99	Gene Johnson	Philadelphia Eagles	B
1960	3	12	36	Jim Leo	New York Giants	DE
1960	6	1	61	Jacky Lee	Chicago Cardinals	QB
1960	6	8	68	Ed Kovac	Chicago Bears	B
1960	9	3	99	Max Messner	Detroit Lions	T
1960	16	3	183	Steve Rasso	Detroit Lions	B
1961	2	12	26	Ron Kostelnik	Green Bay Packers	T
1962	7	13	97	Ken Byers	New York Giants	T
1964	6	12	82	Jim Curry	Dallas Cowboys	E
1965	3	7	35	Al Nelson	Philadelphia Eagles	RB
1965	7	5	89	Brig Owens	Dallas Cowboys	QB
1965	12	14	168	Ted Rodosovich	Baltimore Colts	G
1967	5	25	132	Jay Bachman	Green Bay Packers	C
1969	1	5	5	Greg Cook	Cincinnati Bengals	QB
1969	4	5	83	Clem Turner	Cincinnati Bengals	RB
1969	12	1	287	Lloyd Pate	Buffalo Bills	RB
1970	3	18	70	Jim O'Brien	Baltimore Colts	K
1971	1	21	21	Bob Bell	Detroit Lions	DT
1971	10	10	244	Jesse Taylor	Washington Redskins	RB
1974	3	21	73	Evan Jolitz	Cincinnati Bengals	LB
1974	8	3	185	Tom Forrest	San Diego Chargers	G
1974	9	7	215	Reggie Harrison	St. Louis Cardinals	RB
1974	17	18	434	Sal Casalo	Buffalo Bills	K
1975	5	18	122	Jeff West	Cincinnati Bengals	P
1975	12	18	304	Charles Bland	Dallas Cowboys	DB
1976	6	23	179	Tom Marvaso	Washington Redskins	DB
1976	9	28	265	Wentford Gaines	Pittsburgh Steelers	DB
1976	14	3	378	Ed Jones	San Diego Chargers	G
1976	17	4	463	Clarence Sanders	San Diego Chargers	LB
1977	6	22	161	Keith Jenkins	Atlanta Falcons	DB
1977	11	19	298	Lou West	Pittsburgh Steelers	DB
1978	2	24	52	Mike Woods	Baltimore Colts	LB
1978	10	10	260	Mike Connell	San Francisco 49ers	P
1978	10	14	264	Charles Price	San Diego Chargers	TE
1979	8	2	194	Howie Kurnick	Cincinnati Bengals	LB
1979	11	11	286	Bob Wright	Chicago Bears	T
1980	6	17	155	Farley Bell	Washington Redskins	LB
1982	8	27	222	Kari Yli-Renko	Cincinnati Bengals	T
1982	12	12	318	Hobson Milner	Minnesota Vikings	RB
1984u	2	19	47	George Jamison	Detroit Lions	LB
1987	2	14	42	Alex Gordon	New York Jets	LB
1987	11	1	280	Reggie Taylor	Tampa Bay Buccaneers	RB
1988	11	4	281	Danny McCoin	Detroit Lions	QB
1989	4	23	107	Andrew Stewart	Cleveland Browns	DE
1989	8	6	201	Chris Asbeck	Pittsburgh Steelers	DT
1993	6	25	165	Ronnie Dixon	New Orleans Saints	DT
1994	4	16	119	Michael Davis	Houston Oilers	DB
1994	6	22	183	Jocelyn Borgella	Detroit Lions	DB
1997	5	6	136	Sam Garnes	New York Giants	DB
1997	6	20	183	Robert Tate	Minnesota Vikings	WR
1998	2	13	43	Artrell Hawkins	Cincinnati Bengals	DB
1998	3	18	79	Brad Jackson	Miami Dolphins	LB
1998	4	19	111	Jason Fabini	New York Jets	T
1998	6	28	181	Derrick Ransom	Kansas City Chiefs	DE
1998	7	48	237	Rodrick Monroe	Dallas Cowboys	TE
1999	6	35	204	Chad Plummer	Denver Broncos	WR
2001	6	23	186	Mario Monds	Washington Redskins	DT
2002	7	1	212	Lavar Glover	Pittsburgh Steelers	DB
2003	3	3	67	Antwan Peek	Houston Texans	LB
2003	5	24	159	Jon Olinger	Atlanta Falcons	WR
2003	7	6	220	Blue Adams	Detroit Lions	DB
2005	5	10	146	Trent Cole	Philadelphia Eagles	LB
2005	5	37	173	Tyjuan Hagler	Indianapolis Colts	LB
2005	7	1	215	Daven Holly	San Francisco 49ers	DB
2007	4	11	110	John Bowie	Oakland Raiders	DB
2007	5	25	162	Brent Celek	Philadelphia Eagles	TE
2008	6	40	206	Haruki Nakamura	Baltimore Ravens	DB
2008	7	37	244	Angelo Craig	Cincinnati Bengals	LB
2009	2	14	46	Connor Barwin	Houston Texans	DE
2009	5	6	142	Kevin Huber	Cincinnati Bengals	P
2009	5	7	143	DeAngelo Smith	Dallas Cowboys	DB
2009	6	14	187	Brandon Underwood	Green Bay Packers	DB
2009	7	18	227	Mike Mickens	Dallas Cowboys	DB
2009	7	45	254	Trevor Canfield	Arizona Cardinals	G
2010	4	1	99	Mardy Gilyard	St. Louis Rams	WR
2010	6	35	204	Tony Pike	Carolina Panthers	QB
2010	7	31	238	Ricardo Mathews	Indianapolis Colts	DT
2011	6	26	191	Jason Kelce	Philadelphia Eagles	C
2012	2	4	36	Derek Wolfe	Denver Broncos	DT
2012	2	18	50	Isaiah Pead	St. Louis Rams	RB
2012	3	24	87	John Hughes	Cleveland Browns	DT
2012	4	32	127	Adrien Robinson	New York Giants	TE
2013	3	1	63	Travis Kelce	Kansas City Chiefs	TE
2016	4	7	107	Parker Ehinger	Kansas City Chiefs	G
2016	4	9	109	Chris Moore	Baltimore Ravens	WR
2017	6	3	187	Mike Tyson	Seattle Seahawks	DB
2018	7	36	254	Korey Cunningham	Arizona Cardinals	T
2019	7	28	242	Cortez Broughton	Los Angeles Chargers	DT
2020	3	34	94	Josiah Deguara	Green Bay Packers	TE
2021	4	5	110	James Hudson	Cleveland Browns	T
2021	5	19	163	Darrick Forrest	Washington Football Team	DB
2021	7	15	243	James Wiggins	Arizona Cardinals	DB
2021	7	16	244	Gerrid Doaks	Miami Dolphins	RB
2022	1	4	4	Sauce Gardner	New York Jets	DB
2022	2	21	53	Alec Pierce	Indianapolis Colts	WR
2022	2	30	62	Bryan Cook	Kansas City Chiefs	LB
2022	3	10	74	Desmond Ridder	Atlanta Falcons	QB
2022	3	36	100	Myjai Sanders	Arizona Cardinals	DE
2022	4	4	109	Coby Bryant	Seattle Seahawks	DB
2022	5	4	156	Jerome Ford	Cleveland Browns	RB
2022	6	4	182	Darrian Beavers	New York Giants	LB
2022	6	37	216	Curtis Brooks	Indianapolis Colts	DT
2023	3	37	100	Tre Tucker	Las Vegas Raiders	WR
2023	4	31	133	Tyler Scott	Chicago Bears	WR
2023	5	14	147	Josh Whyle	Tennessee Titans	TE
2024	7	23	243	Jowon Briggs	Cleveland Browns	DT
2025	7	34	250	John Williams	Green Bay Packers	G
2026	2	19	51	Jake Golday	Minnesota Vikings	LB
2026	5	30	170	Joe Royer	Cleveland Browns	TE
2026	5	36	176	Cyrus Allen	Kansas City Chiefs	WR
2026	7	19	235	Gavin Gerhardt	Minnesota Vikings	C

== Notes ==
George Jamison was drafted in the 1984 NFL supplemental draft.

== Notable undrafted players ==
Note: No drafts held before 1920

Year	Player	Debut Team	Position	Notes
1967	Teddy Bailey	Buffalo Bills	RB	—
1967	Errol Prisby	Denver Broncos	DB	—
1972	Al Johnson	Houston Oilers	DB	—
1978	Dan Rains	Philadelphia Eagles	LB	—
1981	Rich Karlis	Houston Oilers	K	—
1983	Antonio Gibson	New Orleans Saints	S	—
1983	Allen Harvin	Washington Redskins	RB	—
1983	Mel Jenkins	Seattle Seahawks	DB	—
1984	Don Goodman	Washington Redskins	RB	—
1985	Deno Foster	Green Bay Packers	WR	—
1985	John Tushar	Seattle Seahawks	G	—
1987	Toney Catchings	New York Giants	LB	—
1987	Greg Lathan	Los Angeles Raiders	WR	—
1987	Robert Niehoff	Cincinnati Bengals	DB	—
1987	Jon Sawyer	New England Patriots	DB	—
1991	John Thornton	Cleveland Browns	DT	—
1992	Vaughn Booker	Kansas City Chiefs	DE	—
1994	Nate Dingle	Washington Redskins	LB	—
1997	Chris Hewitt	New Orleans Saints	DB	—
1998	Pierre Brillant	Jacksonville Jaguars	T	—
2001	Troy Evans	St. Louis Rams	LB	—
2002	Antonio Chatman	San Francisco 49ers	WR	—
2002	Adam Wulfeck	Kansas City Chiefs	P	—
2003	Ray Jackson	Tennessee Titans	RB	—
2004	Zach Norton	Baltimore Ravens	DB	—
2005	Jamar Enzor	New York Jets	LB	—
2005	Andre Frazier	Pittsburgh Steelers	LB	Super Bowl Champion (XL), (XLIII)
2005	Gino Guidugli	Tennessee Titans	QB	—
2005	Clint Stickdorn	Cleveland Browns	T	—
2005	Mike Wright	New England Patriots	DT	—
2009	Adam Hoppel	Cleveland Browns	DE	—
2009	Ryan Manalac	Buffalo Bills	LB	—
2010	Jeff Linkenbach	Indianapolis Colts	T	—
2010	Mike Windt	Cincinnati Bengals	LS	—
2011	Armon Binns	Jacksonville Jaguars	WR	—
2012	Zach Collaros	Tampa Bay Buccaneers	QB	—
2012	J. K. Schaffer	Cincinnati Bengals	LB	—
2013	Kenbrell Thompkins	New England Patriots	WR	—
2013	George Winn	Houston Texans	RB	—
2014	Blake Annen	Chicago Bears	TE	—
2015	Tyreek Burwell	San Diego Chargers	T	—
2016	Johnny Holton	Oakland Raiders	WR	—
2016	Justin Murray	Denver Broncos	T	—
2017	Deyshawn Bond	Indianapolis Colts	C	—
2017	Tion Green	Detroit Lions	RB	—
2017	Eric Wilson	Minnesota Vikings	LB	—
2018	Mike Boone	Minnesota Vikings	RB	—
2018	Lyndon Johnson	Jacksonville Jaguars	DT	—
2018	Linden Stephens	New Orleans Saints	DB	—
2019	Dino Boyd	Kansas City Chiefs	T	—
2020	Michael Warren II	Philadelphia Eagles	RB	—
2022	Michael Young Jr.	Indianapolis Colts	WR	—
2023	Ivan Pace Jr.	Minnesota Vikings	LB	All-Rookie Team (2023)
2024	Emory Jones	Baltimore Ravens	QB	—
2025	Jared Bartlett	New York Jets	LB	—
2025	Luke Kandra	Carolina Panthers	OG	—
2025	Corey Kiner	San Francisco 49ers	RB	—
2025	Dartanyan Tinsley	Cleveland Browns	OG	—
2026	Jeff Caldwell	Kansas City Chiefs	WR	—
2026	Jack Dingle	Cincinnati Bengals	LB	—
