= 2002 Cincinnati Bearcats football team =

American college football season

2002 Cincinnati Bearcats football

C-USA co-champion

New Orleans Bowl, L 19–24 vs. North Texas
- Conference: Conference USA
- Record: 7–7 (6–2 C-USA)
- Head coach: Rick Minter (9th season)
- Offensive coordinator: Rusty Burns (1st season)
- Offensive scheme: Spread
- Defensive coordinator: A. J. Christoff (2nd season)
- Base defense: 4–3
- Home stadium: Nippert Stadium

2002 Conference USA football standings
	Conf.			Overall
Team	W		L	W		L
Cincinnati +	6	–	2	7	–	7
No. 23 TCU +	6	–	2	10	–	2
Louisville	5	–	3	7	–	6
Southern Miss	5	–	3	7	–	6
Tulane	4	–	4	8	–	5
UAB	4	–	4	5	–	7
East Carolina	4	–	4	4	–	8
Houston	3	–	5	5	–	7
Memphis	2	–	6	3	–	9
Army	1	–	7	1	–	11
+ – Conference co-champions; Rankings from AP Poll

The 2002 Cincinnati Bearcats football team represented the University of Cincinnati in the 2002 NCAA Division I-A football season. The team, coached by Rick Minter, played its home games in Nippert Stadium, as it has since 1924. The Bearcats finished the season 7–7 (6–2 in the C-USA) and were invited to the New Orleans bowl, where they lost 24–19 to North Texas.

== Schedule ==
Date	Time	Opponent	Site	TV	Result	Attendance	Source
September 2	4:30 pm	TCU	Nippert Stadium; Cincinnati, OH	ESPN	W 36–29 ^{OT}	25,518	
September 14	7:00 pm	West Virginia*	Nippert Stadium; Cincinnati, OH		L 32–35	28,806	
September 21	3:30 pm	No. 6 Ohio State*	Paul Brown Stadium; Cincinnati, OH	ESPN	L 19–23	66,319	
September 28	12:00 pm	at Temple*	Franklin Field; Philadelphia, PA		W 35–22	18,336	
October 5	1:00 pm	Miami (OH)*	Nippert Stadium; Cincinnati, OH (Victory Bell)		L 26–31	31,478	
October 12	3:30 pm	at Tulane	Louisiana Superdome; New Orleans, LA		L 17–35	19,575	
October 19	2:00 pm	at Southern Miss	M. M. Roberts Stadium; Hattiesburg, MS		L 14–23	28,031	
October 26	2:00 pm	Memphis	Nippert Stadium; Cincinnati, OH (rivalry)	ESPN Plus	W 48–10	20,747	
November 7	7:30 pm	at Louisville	Papa John's Cardinal Stadium; Louisville, KY (The Keg of Nails)	ESPN	W 24–14	36,253	
November 16	1:00 pm	Houston	Nippert Stadium; Cincinnati, OH		W 47–14	14,023	
November 23	11:00 pm	at Hawaii*	Aloha Stadium; Halawa, HI	ESPN Plus	L 19–20	36,851	
November 30	1:00 pm	UAB	Nippert Stadium; Cincinnati, OH		W 31–23	9,606	
December 6	7:00 pm	at East Carolina	Dowdy–Ficklen Stadium; Greenville, NC	ESPN2	W 42–26	18,125	
December 17	7:00 pm	vs. North Texas*	Louisiana Superdome; New Orleans, LA (New Orleans Bowl)	ESPN2	L 19–24	19,024	
*Non-conference game; Rankings from AP Poll released prior to the game; All times are in Eastern time

== Roster ==
2002 Cincinnati Bearcats football team roster
Players
Coaches
Offense

Pos.	#	Name	Class
G	70	Ryan Brown	Fr
C	52	Sean Cahill	Fr
OT	76	Anthony Colton	Jr
G	72	Kirt Doolin	Sr
QB	8	Gino Guidugli	So
WR	3	Tye Keith	Sr
TE	89	A. J. Lucius	So
RB	31	DeMarco McCleskey	Sr
G	68	Travis McGee	Fr
G	65	Matt Mercer	So
WR	84	Jon Olinger	Sr
OT	53	Russ Owens	Fr
WR	22	Derick Ross	Fr
OT	69	Jeremy Schlicher	So
C	66	Josh Shneyderov	Jr
G	79	Adam Shorter	So
OT	77	Clint Stickdorn	So
WR	6	LaDaris Vann	Sr

Defense

Pos.	#	Name	Class
CB	26	Blue Adams	Sr
DE	93	Derrick Adams	Sr
S	21	Marvin Allen	So
DT	95	DeMarcus Billings	So
DE	56	Michael Brown	Fr
DE	62	Trent Cole	So
LB	46	Jamar Enzor	So
DE	91	Andre Frazier	So
LB	42	Tyjuan Hagler	So
CB	18	Daven Holly	So
CB	21	Frank Lang	Sr
CB	29	Zach Norton	Jr
DE	56	Antwan Peek	Sr
DT	97	Ben Piening	Sr
DE	99	Darryll Ransom	Sr
DE	94	Adam Roberts	Fr
DT	90	Matt Tupuola	Sr
LB	40	Akanni Turner	So
DT	86	Mike Wright	So

Special teams

Pos.	#	Name	Class
K	16	Jonathan Ruffin	Sr

Head coach

- Rick Minter

Coordinators/assistant coaches

Legend

- (C) Team captain
- (S) Suspended
- (I) Ineligible
- Injured
- Redshirt

Roster
Last update: 2002-08-08

== Awards and milestones ==
=== Conference USA honors ===
==== Offensive player of the week ====
- Week 1: Gino Guidugli

==== Defensive player of the week ====
- Week 4: Blue Adams
- Week 5: Antwan Peek
- Week 10: Andre Frazier
- Week 13: Antwan Peek

==== All-Conference USA First Team ====
- Kirt Doolin, OL
- LaDaris Vann, WR
- Antwan Peek, DL

==== All-Conference USA Second Team ====
- Gino Guidugli, QB
- DeMarco McCleskey, RB
- Jonathan Ruffin, K
- Blue Adams, DB

==== All-Conference USA Rookie Team ====
- Chet Ervin, P
- Joel Yakovac, OL

== Players in the 2003 NFL draft ==
Player	Position	Round	Pick	NFL club
Antwan Peek	LB	3	67	Houston Texans
Jon Olinger	WR	5	159	Atlanta Falcons
Blue Adams	CB	7	220	Detroit Lions
