= 2007 Cincinnati Bearcats football team =

American college football season

2007 Cincinnati Bearcats football

PapaJohns.com Bowl champion

PapaJohns.com Bowl, W 31–21 vs. Southern Miss
- Conference: Big East Conference

Ranking
- Coaches: No. 20
- AP: No. 17
- Record: 10–3 (4–3 Big East)
- Head coach: Brian Kelly (1st season)
- Offensive coordinator: Jeff Quinn (1st season)
- Offensive scheme: Multiple
- Defensive coordinator: Joe Tresey (1st season)
- Base defense: 4–3
- Home stadium: Nippert Stadium

2007 Big East Conference football standings
	Conf.			Overall
Team	W		L	W		L
No. 6 West Virginia $+	5	–	2	11	–	2
Connecticut +	5	–	2	9	–	4
No. 17 Cincinnati	4	–	3	10	–	3
South Florida	4	–	3	9	–	4
Rutgers	3	–	4	8	–	5
Louisville	3	–	4	6	–	6
Pittsburgh	3	–	4	5	–	7
Syracuse	1	–	6	2	–	10
$ – BCS representative as conference champion; + – Conference co-champions; Rankings from AP Poll

The 2007 Cincinnati Bearcats football team represented the University of Cincinnati in the 2007 NCAA Division I FBS football season. The team, coached by Brian Kelly, played its home games in Nippert Stadium, as it has since 1923. This was Kelly's first complete season with the Bearcats, having coached them to a 27–24 win against Western Michigan in the 2007 International Bowl.

The 2007 season was a breakthrough for Cincinnati football, as it saw the Bearcats break into the national rankings for the first time since 1976. The Bearcats' highest rank of their 2007 campaign was 15th in the AP Poll.

== Schedule ==
Date	Time	Opponent	Rank	Site	TV	Result	Attendance
August 30	7:00 p.m.	Southeast Missouri State*		Nippert Stadium; Cincinnati, OH	ESPN360	W 59–3	20,223
September 6	7:30 p.m.	Oregon State*		Nippert Stadium; Cincinnati, OH	ESPN	W 34–3	25,020
September 15	12:00 p.m.	at Miami (OH)*		Yager Stadium; Oxford, OH (Victory Bell)	ESPN+	W 47–10	22,421
September 22	7:30 p.m.	Marshall*		Nippert Stadium; Cincinnati, OH	ESPN+	W 40–14	35,097
September 29	10:00 p.m.	at San Diego State*	No. 24	Qualcomm Stadium; San Diego, CA	Versus	W 52–23	24,647
October 6	8:00 p.m.	at No. 21 Rutgers	No. 20	Rutgers Stadium; Piscataway, NJ	ESPN2	W 28–23	43,768
October 13	7:00 p.m.	Louisville^{†}	No. 15	Nippert Stadium; Cincinnati, OH (The Keg of Nails)	ESPNU	L 24–28	35,097
October 20	12:00 p.m.	at Pittsburgh	No. 23	Heinz Field; Pittsburgh, PA (River City Rivalry)	ESPN+	L 17–24	33,423
November 3	3:30 p.m.	at No. 20 South Florida		Raymond James Stadium; Tampa, FL	ABC/ESPN	W 38–33	57,379
November 10	3:30 p.m.	No. 16 Connecticut		Nippert Stadium; Cincinnati, OH	ESPNU	W 27–3	30,943
November 17	7:45 p.m.	No. 5 West Virginia	No. 21	Nippert Stadium; Cincinnati, OH	ESPN	L 23–28	35,097
November 24	7:15 p.m.	at Syracuse	No. 24	Carrier Dome; Syracuse, NY	ESPNU	W 52–31	30,040
December 22	1:00 p.m.	vs. Southern Miss*	No. 20	Legion Field; Birmingham, AL (Papajohns.com Bowl)	ESPN2	W 31–21	35,258
*Non-conference game; ^{†}Homecoming; Rankings from AP Poll released prior to the game; All times are in Eastern time

== Rankings ==
Ranking movements Legend: ██ Increase in ranking ██ Decrease in ranking — = Not ranked RV = Received votes
	Week															
Poll	Pre	1	2	3	4	5	6	7	8	9	10	11	12	13	14	Final
AP	—	—	RV	RV	24	20	15	23	RV	—	RV	21	24	20	20	17
Coaches Poll	—	—	RV	RV	RV	24	17	23	RV	RV	RV	25	RV	24	23	20
Harris	Not released				RV	24	17	23	RV	RV	RV	24	24	21	20	Not released
BCS	Not released							23	—	—	—	22	24	23	22	Not released

== Roster ==
(as of October 16, 2007)
Wide receivers: 1 Mardy Gilyard – Junior; 2 David Wess – Junior; 14 Earnest Jackson – Senior; 16 Dominick Goodman – Junior; 24 Jared Martin – (redshirt) Sophomore; 33 Kurt Shoemaker – Junior; 38 Tomaz Hilton – Freshman; 81 Antwuan Giddens – Senior; 82 Joey Thomas – Freshman; 84 Orion Woodard – Freshman; 85 Marcus Barnett – (redshirt) Freshman; 86 Armon Binns – Freshman; 87 Charley Howard – (redshirt) Sophomore; 88 Adrien Robinson – Freshman; Offensive line: 56 Chris Jurek – (redshirt) Sophomore; 59 Alex Hoffman – Freshman; 60 Jason Kelce – (redshirt) Freshman; 63 Blake McCroskey – Freshman; 64 Chris Flores – Senior; 65 T.J. Franklin – Freshman; 66 Sam Griffin – Freshman; 68 Craig Parmenter – Freshman; 69 Frank Becker – Freshman; 70 C. J. Cobb – (redshirt) Freshman; 71 Jeff Linkenbach – (redshirt) Sophomore; 72 Digger Bujnoch – Senior; 73 Mario Duenas – Senior; 74 Ken Rodriguez – Senior; 76 Trevor Canfield – Junior; 78 Taylor Porter – (redshirt) Sophomore; 79 Khalil El-Amin – Junior; Tight ends: 19 Ben Guidugli – (redshirt) Freshman; 34 Nick DeFilippo – Junior; 35 Marcus Waugh – Sophomore; 83 Kazeem Alli – (redshirt) Sophomore; 89 Connor Barwin – Junior; Fullbacks: 86 Doug Jones – Senior	Quarterbacks: 4 Dustin Grutza – Junior; 7 Craig Carey – Sophomore; 8 Chazz Anderson – Freshman; 9 Ben Mauk – Senior; 12 Zach Collaros – Freshman; 15 Tony Pike – (redshirt) Sophomore; Running backs: 5 Mike Daniels – Senior; 11 Bradley Glatthaar – Senior; 20 Jacob Ramsey – Sophomore; 22 John Goebel – Sophomore; 23 Butler Benton – Senior; 32 Montez Patterson – Freshman; 48 Greg Moore – Senior; Defensive line: 10 Lamonte Nelms – Junior; 12 Anthony Hoke – Senior; 40 John Hughes – Freshman; 53 Randy Martinez – Freshman; 54 Jon Newton – Senior; 67 Adam Hoppel – Junior; 75 Thomas Claggett – Junior; 82 Angelo Craig – Senior; 90 Ricardo Mathews – Sophomore; 91 Tyler Clifford – Sophomore; 94 Rob Trigg – Freshman; 95 Terrill Byrd – Junior; 98 Ralston Reeves – (redshirt) Freshman; 99 Chris Harrison – (redshirt) Freshman	Linebackers: 3 Delbert Ferguson – Junior; 9 Alex Delisi – (redshirt) Freshman; 31 Jon Carpenter – Senior; 37 Anthony Williams – Senior; 42 Corey Smith – Junior; 43 Robby Armstrong – (redshirt) Freshman; 45 Ryan Manalac – Junior; 47 Collin McCafferty – (redshirt) Freshman; 49 Torry Cornett – Junior; 27 Jeremy Matthews – Freshman; 52 Ricardo Thompson – Freshman; 55 Leo Morgan – Senior; 57 Obadiah Cheatham – (redshirt) Freshman; Defensive backs: 4 Drew Frey – Freshman; 6 DeAngelo Smith – Junior; 13 Haruki Nakamura – Senior; 17 Aaron Webster – Sophomore; 17 Bryant Thomas – Freshman; 18 Cedric Tolbert – Junior; 21 Mike Mickens – Junior; 25 Brad Jones – (redshirt) Sophomore; 26 Martez Williams – (redshirt) Freshman; 32 Justin Moore – (redshirt) Sophomore; 36 Jason Whitehead – Sophomore; 37 Deon Reed – Freshman; 39 Mike Latessa – Freshman; 41 Tahree McQueen – Freshman; 44 Evan Sparks – Senior; 46 Scott Johnson – Freshman; Punters: 47 Kevin Huber – Junior; 61 Micheal Cooke – Freshman; Kickers: 92 Brandon Yingling – Junior; 97 Jake Rogers – (redshirt) Freshman; Deep Snapper: 51 Alex Apyan – Freshman; 93 Mike Windt – (redshirt) Freshman; 96 Tom DeTemple – Freshman
† Starter at position * Injured; will not play in 2007.

== Coaching staff ==
Brian Kelly – Head coach

Keith Gilmore – Assistant head coach/defensive line

Jeff Quinn – Offensive coordinator/offensive line

Joe Tresey – Defensive coordinator

Kerry Coombs – Defensive backs coach

Mike Elston – Recruiting/special teams/tight ends

Greg Forest – Quarterbacks coach

Tim Hinton – Linebackers coach

Ernest T. Jones – Running backs coach

Charley Molnar – Wide receivers coach

John Widecan – Assistant AD/football operations

Brad Bury – Student assistant

Paul Longo – Strength and conditioning

Jesse Minter – Defensive graduate assistant

Michael Painter – Offensive staff intern

Adam Shorter – Offensive graduate assistant

Marty Spieler – Defensive staff intern

Erin Clayton – Administrative assistant

Jacob Flint – Assistant strength coach

Maria Gruber – Administrative coordinator

Matt Louis – Administrative coordinator

John Sells – Video coordinator

== Game summaries ==
=== Southeast Missouri State ===
	1	2	3	4	Total
SE Missouri State	0	3	0	0	3
Cincinnati	6	13	20	20	59

The games was the first regular season game for new coach, Brian Kelly. The Bearcats' 59-3 victory was the most lopsided in school history since beating Louisiana-Monroe, then known as Northeast Louisiana, 63-0 in 1977. The Bearcats' 615 yards was the third most in school history.

=== Oregon State ===
	1	2	3	4	Total
Oregon State	0	3	0	0	3
Cincinnati	3	7	24	0	34

=== Miami University ===
	1	2	3	4	Total
Cincinnati	16	10	7	14	47
Miami University	0	3	7	0	10

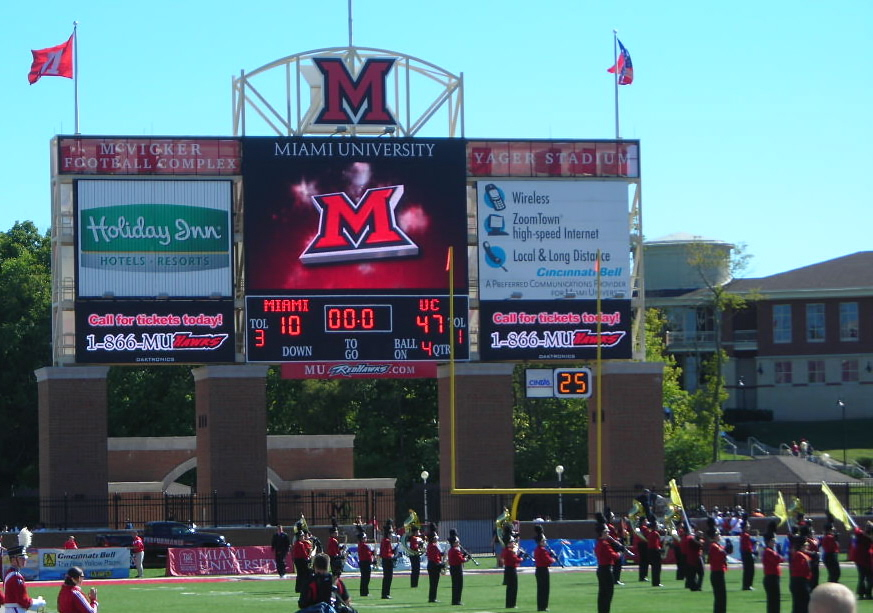
After the game UC's band plays in front of the scoreboard showing the final score

Dustin Grutza, who started in place of the injured UC quarterback Ben Mauk threw for two scores to lead the Bearcats to a 47-10 win over the Miami RedHawks. UC defense dominated the game with a fumble recovery, three interceptions, a blocked punt, and five sacks.

=== Marshall ===
	1	2	3	4	Total
Marshall	2	6	0	6	14
Cincinnati	12	14	0	14	40

=== San Diego State ===
	1	2	3	4	Total
Cincinnati	7	28	7	10	52
San Diego State	3	7	0	13	23

=== Rutgers ===
	1	2	3	4	Total
Cincinnati	7	0	21	0	28
Rutgers	7	10	3	3	23

=== Louisville ===
	1	2	3	4	Total
Louisville	7	7	7	7	28
Cincinnati	14	0	7	3	24

=== Pittsburgh ===
	1	2	3	4	Total
Cincinnati	10	7	0	0	17
Pittsburgh	3	7	3	11	24

=== South Florida ===
	1	2	3	4	Total
Cincinnati	31	7	0	0	38
#20 South Florida	14	6	7	6	33

The 31 points scored in the first quarter is a Cincinnati record for most points scored in a single quarter.

=== Connecticut ===
	1	2	3	4	Total
#16 Connecticut	0	3	0	0	3
Cincinnati	13	0	7	7	27

=== West Virginia ===
	1	2	3	4	Total
#5 West Virginia	7	14	0	7	28
Cincinnati	7	3	0	13	23

Cincinnati came into the game predicted by some to upset the mountaineers. However, for the majority of the game West Virginia used their punishing ground attack to build a 21-7 lead heading into the fourth quarter. However, after a costly fumble leading to another West Virginia touchdown, the Bearcats rallied. Their defense force two fumbles and a punt by the Mountaineers, and the offense cashed in with two touchdowns. After UC's second touchdown and a failed two-point conversion, West Virginia recovered an onside kick attempt and managed to run out the clock, handing the Bearcats their third loss.

=== Syracuse ===
	1	2	3	4	Total
Cincinnati	14	14	14	10	52
Syracuse	3	14	14	0	31

=== PapaJohns.com Bowl ===
	1	2	3	4	Total
Southern Miss	7	0	7	7	21
Cincinnati	0	14	17	0	31

. The Cincinnati Bearcats led by Quarterback Ben Mauk ended Southern Mississippi coach Jeff Bower's 17-year tenure as head coach at Southern Miss in losing fashion, 31-21. Mauk went 30-52 for 334 yards, 4 touchdowns and 3 interceptions. Mauk became the 3rd player in Cincinnati history to throw for 3,000 yards in a season. His favorite target was Dominick Goodman who caught 7 passes for 95 yards and 2 touchdowns. The defense was led by DeAngelo Smith who had a whopping 3 interceptions. For Southern Miss, Jeremy Young went 18-32 for 122 yards and 2 touchdowns, but 3 interceptions. Damion Fletcher led the team in rushing and receiving, with 155 yards on 29 carries on the ground and 7 catches for 50 yards through the air. Southern Miss jumped to an early 7-0 lead on a 10-yard pass from Young to Shawn Nelson in the 1st quarter. In the 2nd quarter, Cincinnati struck back when Mauk threw both touchdown passes to Goodman to end the half. In the 3rd quarter Mauk hooked up with Ernest Jackson for 29 yards and a touchdown to make it 21-7 in favor of the Bearcats. Young then had a 1-yard run with 6:48 to play in the 3rd to make it 21-14. Cincinnati then pulled away when Mauk hit Antwuan Giddens for his last touchdown. A field goal by Jake Rogers made it 31-14 Bearcats, and they never looked back.

== Awards and milestones ==
=== All-Americans ===
- Mike Mickens, CB
- Kevin Huber, P

=== Big East Conference honors ===
- Special Teams Player of the Year: Kevin Huber
- Coach of the Year: Brian Kelly

==== Offensive player of the week ====
- Week 3: Dustin Grutza
- Week 5: Ben Mauk
- Week 13: Ben Mauk

==== Defensive player of the week ====
- Week 1: Mike Mickens
- Week 6: Ryan Manalac
- Week 10: Haruki Nakamura

==== Special teams player of the week ====
- Week 2: Jacob Rogers
- Week 6: Kevin Huber

==== Big East Conference All-Conference First Team ====
- Terrill Byrd, DL
- Mike Mickens, DB
- Haruki Nakamura, DB
- Kevin Huber, P

==== Big East Conference All-Conference Second Team ====
- Marcus Barnett, WR
- Trevor Canfield, OL
- Anthony Hoke, DL
- DeAngelo Smith, DB

== Players in the 2008 NFL draft ==
Player	Position	Round	Pick	NFL club
Haruki Nakamura	S	6	206	Baltimore Ravens
Angelo Craig	DE	7	244	Cincinnati Bengals
