= 2005 Cincinnati Bearcats football team =

American college football season

2005 Cincinnati Bearcats football
- Conference: Big East Conference
- Record: 4–7 (2–5 Big East)
- Head coach: Mark Dantonio (2nd season)
- Offensive coordinator: Don Treadwell (2nd season)
- Offensive scheme: Multiple
- Defensive coordinator: Pat Narduzzi (2nd season)
- Base defense: 4–3
- Home stadium: Nippert Stadium

2005 Big East Conference football standings
	Conf.			Overall
Team	W		L	W		L
No. 5 West Virginia $	7	–	0	11	–	1
No. 19 Louisville	5	–	2	9	–	3
Rutgers	4	–	3	7	–	5
South Florida	4	–	3	6	–	6
Pittsburgh	4	–	3	5	–	6
Connecticut	2	–	5	5	–	6
Cincinnati	2	–	5	4	–	7
Syracuse	0	–	7	1	–	10
$ – BCS representative as conference champion; Rankings from AP Poll

The 2005 Cincinnati Bearcats football team represented the University of Cincinnati in the 2005 NCAA Division I FBS football season. The team, coached by Mark Dantonio, played its home games in Nippert Stadium, as it has since 1924.

== Schedule ==
Date	Time	Opponent	Site	TV	Result	Attendance
September 1	7:00 pm	Eastern Michigan*	Nippert Stadium; Cincinnati, OH		W 28–26	21,458
September 10	12:00 pm	at Penn State*	Beaver Stadium; State College, PA	ESPN+	L 24–42	98,727
September 17	7:00 pm	Western Carolina*	Nippert Stadium; Cincinnati, OH		W 7–3	22,637
September 28	7:00 pm	at Miami (OH)*	Yager Stadium; Oxford, OH (Victory Bell)	ESPN2	L 16–44	19,163
October 8	2:00 pm	at Pittsburgh	Heinz Field; Pittsburgh, PA (River City Rivalry)		L 20–38	30,343
October 15	4:00 pm	Connecticut	Nippert Stadium; Cincinnati, OH		W 28–17	21,039
October 22	12:00 pm	Louisville	Nippert Stadium; Cincinnati, OH (The Keg of Nails)	ESPNU	L 22–46	21,086
October 29	12:00 pm	at Syracuse	Carrier Dome; Syracuse, NY	ESPN+	W 22–16	42,457
November 9	7:30 pm	No. 16 West Virginia	Nippert Stadium; Cincinnati, OH	ESPN2	L 0–38	25,893
November 19	12:00 pm	at South Florida	Raymond James Stadium; Tampa, FL	ESPN+	L 16–31	27,204
November 26	1:00 pm	at Rutgers	Rutgers Stadium; Piscataway, NJ		L 9–44	34,611
*Non-conference game; Rankings from AP Poll released prior to the game; All times are in Eastern time

== Roster ==
2005 Cincinnati Bearcats football team roster
Players			Coaches
Offense: Pos. / # / Name / Class; TE / 85 / Brent Celek / Jr	Defense: Pos. / # / Name / Class; LB / 82 / Angelo Craig / So	Special teams: Pos. / # / Name / Class; P / 47 / Kevin Huber / Fr	Head coach: Mark Dantonio; Coordinators/assistant coaches: Dan Enos (Quarterbacks); Legend: (C) Team captain; (S) Suspended; (I) Ineligible; Injured; Redshirt; Roster

== Awards and milestones ==
=== Big East Conference honors ===
==== Offensive player of the week ====
- Week 1: Dustin Grutza

==== Defensive player of the week ====
- Week 8: Kevin McCullough

==== Special teams player of the week ====
- Week 8: Chet Ervin

==== Big East Conference All-Conference Second Team ====
- Corey Smith, LB
- Mike Mickens, DB
