= 2005 Connecticut Huskies football team =

American college football season

2005 Connecticut Huskies football
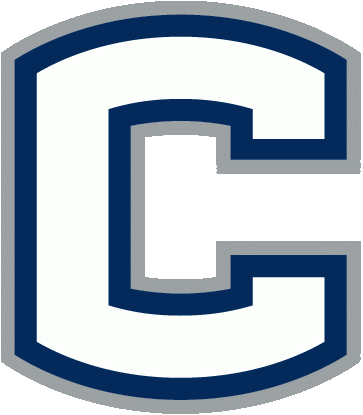
- Conference: Big East Conference
- Record: 5–6 (2–5 Big East)
- Head coach: Randy Edsall (7th season)
- Offensive coordinator: Norries Wilson (4th season)
- Offensive scheme: Multiple
- Defensive coordinator: Todd Orlando (1st season)
- Base defense: 3–4
- Home stadium: Rentschler Field

2005 Big East Conference football standings
	Conf.			Overall
Team	W		L	W		L
No. 5 West Virginia $	7	–	0	11	–	1
No. 19 Louisville	5	–	2	9	–	3
Rutgers	4	–	3	7	–	5
South Florida	4	–	3	6	–	6
Pittsburgh	4	–	3	5	–	6
Connecticut	2	–	5	5	–	6
Cincinnati	2	–	5	4	–	7
Syracuse	0	–	7	1	–	10
$ – BCS representative as conference champion; Rankings from AP Poll

The 2005 Connecticut Huskies football team represented the University of Connecticut as a member of the Big East Conference during the 2005 NCAA Division I-A football season. Led by seventh-year head coach Randy Edsall, the Huskies compiled an overall record of 5–6 with a mark of 2–5 in conference play, tying for sixth place in the Big East. The team played home games at Rentschler Field in East Hartford, Connecticut.

== Schedule ==
Date	Time	Opponent	Site	TV	Result	Attendance
September 1	7:30 pm	Buffalo*	Rentschler Field; East Hartford, CT		W 38–0	40,000
September 10	1:00 pm	Liberty*	Rentschler Field; East Hartford, CT		W 59–0	40,000
September 17	6:45 pm	at No. 16 Georgia Tech*	Bobby Dodd Stadium; Atlanta, GA	ESPNU	L 13–28	48,770
October 1	12:00 pm	at Army*	Michie Stadium; West Point, NY	ESPNU	W 47–13	38,482
October 7	8:00 pm	Syracuse	Rentschler Field; East Hartford, CT (rivalry)	ESPN2	W 26–7	40,000
October 15	4:00 pm	at Cincinnati	Nippert Stadium; Cincinnati, OH		L 17–28	21,039
October 22	3:00 pm	Rutgers^{†}	Rentschler Field; East Hartford, CT		L 24–26	40,000
November 2	7:30 pm	at No. 16 West Virginia	Milan Puskar Stadium; Morgantown, WV	ESPN2	L 13–45	52,808
November 12	12:00 pm	at Pittsburgh	Heinz Field; Pittsburgh, PA	ESPN Plus	L 0–24	35,145
November 26	3:30 pm	South Florida	Rentschler Field; East Hartford, CT	ABC	W 15–10	40,000
December 3	7:45 pm	No. 16 Louisville	Rentschler Field; East Hartford, CT	ESPN	L 20–30	40,000
*Non-conference game; ^{†}Homecoming; Rankings from AP Poll released prior to the game; All times are in Eastern time
