= 2005 Rutgers Scarlet Knights football team =

American college football season

2005 Rutgers Scarlet Knights football
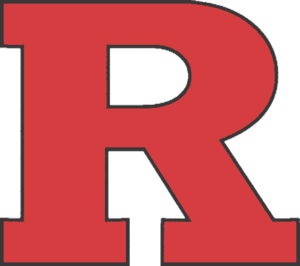

Insight Bowl, L 40–45 vs. Arizona State
- Conference: Big East Conference
- Record: 7–5 (4–3 Big East)
- Head coach: Greg Schiano (5th season)
- Offensive coordinator: Craig Ver Steeg (3rd season)
- Offensive scheme: Pro-style
- Base defense: 4–3
- Home stadium: Rutgers Stadium

2005 Big East Conference football standings
	Conf.			Overall
Team	W		L	W		L
No. 5 West Virginia $	7	–	0	11	–	1
No. 19 Louisville	5	–	2	9	–	3
Rutgers	4	–	3	7	–	5
South Florida	4	–	3	6	–	6
Pittsburgh	4	–	3	5	–	6
Connecticut	2	–	5	5	–	6
Cincinnati	2	–	5	4	–	7
Syracuse	0	–	7	1	–	10
$ – BCS representative as conference champion; Rankings from AP Poll

The 2005 Rutgers Scarlet Knights football team represented Rutgers University in the 2005 NCAA Division I FBS football season. The Scarlet Knights were led by fifth-year head coach Greg Schiano and played their home games at Rutgers Stadium. They are a member of the Big East Conference. They finished the season 7–5, 4–3 in Big East play to finish in a tie for third place as well as their first winning season since 1992. After the season, they were invited to their first Bowl game since 1978. They would lose 45–40 to the Arizona State Sun Devils in the Insight Bowl.

== Schedule ==
Date	Time	Opponent	Site	TV	Result	Attendance
September 3	12:00 pm	at Illinois*	Memorial Stadium; Champaign, IL	ESPN2	L 30–33 ^{OT}	50,112
September 10	3:30 pm	Villanova*	Rutgers Stadium; Piscataway, NJ		W 38–6	32,412
September 17	8:00 pm	at Buffalo*	University at Buffalo Stadium; Buffalo, NY	YES	W 17–3	17,620
September 30	8:00 pm	Pittsburgh	Rutgers Stadium; Piscataway, NJ	ESPN2	W 37–29	37,514
October 8	12:00 pm	West Virginia	Rutgers Stadium; Piscataway, NJ	ESPN Plus	L 14–27	21,717
October 15	12:00 pm	at Syracuse	Carrier Dome; Syracuse, NY	ESPN Plus	W 31–9	39,022
October 22	3:00 pm	at Connecticut	Rentschler Field; East Hartford, CT	ESPN Plus	W 26–24	40,000
October 29	3:30 pm	Navy*	Rutgers Stadium; Piscataway, NJ		W 31–21	41,716
November 5	12:00 pm	South Florida	Rutgers Stadium; Piscataway, NJ	ESPN Plus	L 31–45	31,131
November 11	8:00 pm	at No. 23 Louisville	Papa John's Cardinal Stadium; Louisville, KY	ESPN2	L 5–56	41,219
November 26	1:00 pm	Cincinnati	Rutgers Stadium; Piscataway, NJ		W 44–9	34,611
December 27	8:30 pm	vs. Arizona State*	Chase Field; Phoenix, AZ (Insight Bowl)	ESPN	L 40–45	43,536
*Non-conference game; Rankings from AP Poll released prior to the game; All times are in Eastern time
