= 2005 South Florida Bulls football team =

American college football season

2005 South Florida Bulls football

Meineke Car Care Bowl, L 0–14 vs. NC State
- Conference: Big East Conference
- Record: 6–6 (4–3 Big East)
- Head coach: Jim Leavitt (9th season)
- Offensive coordinator: Rod Smith (1st season)
- Offensive scheme: Multiple
- Co-defensive coordinators: Rick Kravitz (9th season); Wally Burnham (5th season)
- Base defense: 3–4
- Home stadium: Raymond James Stadium

2005 Big East Conference football standings
	Conf.			Overall
Team	W		L	W		L
No. 5 West Virginia $	7	–	0	11	–	1
No. 19 Louisville	5	–	2	9	–	3
Rutgers	4	–	3	7	–	5
South Florida	4	–	3	6	–	6
Pittsburgh	4	–	3	5	–	6
Connecticut	2	–	5	5	–	6
Cincinnati	2	–	5	4	–	7
Syracuse	0	–	7	1	–	10
$ – BCS representative as conference champion; Rankings from AP Poll

The 2005 South Florida Bulls football team represented the University of South Florida (USF) in the 2005 NCAA Division I-A football season. South Florida was led by head coach Jim Leavitt played home games at Raymond James Stadium in Tampa, Florida. The 2005 college football season was only the 9th season overall for the Bulls, and their first season in the Big East Conference.

== Schedule ==
Date	Time	Opponent	Site	TV	Result	Attendance	Source
September 3	3:30 p.m.	at Penn State*	Beaver Stadium; University Park, PA	ESPNU	L 13–23	99,235	
September 10	7:00 p.m.	Florida A&M*	Raymond James Stadium; Tampa, FL		W 37–3	43,122	
September 17	7:00 p.m.	UCF*	Raymond James Stadium; Tampa, FL (War on I–4)	FSNF	W 31–14	45,139	
September 24	6:45 p.m.	No. 9 Louisville	Raymond James Stadium; Tampa, FL	ESPNU	W 45–14	33,586	
October 1	8:00 p.m.	at No. 9 Miami (FL)*	Miami Orange Bowl; Miami, FL	ESPNU	L 7–27	58,308	
October 15	2:00 p.m.	at Pittsburgh	Heinz Field; Pittsburgh, PA	ESPN360	L 17–31	33,497	
November 5	12:00 p.m.	at Rutgers	Rutgers Stadium; Piscataway, NJ	ESPN+	W 45–31	31,131	
November 12	1:30 p.m.	at Syracuse	Carrier Dome; Syracuse, NY		W 27–0	40,144	
November 19	12:00 p.m.	Cincinnati	Raymond James Stadium; Tampa, FL	ESPN+	W 31–16	27,204	
November 26	3:30 p.m.	at Connecticut	Rentschler Field; East Hartford, CT	ABC	L 10–15	40,000	
December 3	7:30 p.m.	No. 12 West Virginia	Raymond James Stadium; Tampa, FL		L 13–28	45,274	
December 31	11:00 a.m.	vs. NC State*	Bank of America Stadium; Charlotte, NC (Meineke Car Care Bowl)	ESPN2	L 0–14	57,937	
*Non-conference game; Rankings from AP Poll released prior to the game; All times are in Eastern time
