= 2005 Syracuse Orange football team =

American college football season

2005 Syracuse Orange football
- Conference: Big East Conference
- Record: 0–10, 1 win vacated (0–7 Big East)
- Head coach: Greg Robinson (1st season)
- Offensive coordinator: Brian Pariani (1st season)
- Offensive scheme: Pro-style
- Base defense: 4–3
- Home stadium: Carrier Dome

2005 Big East Conference football standings
	Conf.			Overall
Team	W		L	W		L
No. 5 West Virginia $	7	–	0	11	–	1
No. 19 Louisville	5	–	2	9	–	3
Rutgers	4	–	3	7	–	5
South Florida	4	–	3	6	–	6
Pittsburgh	4	–	3	5	–	6
Connecticut	2	–	5	5	–	6
Cincinnati	2	–	5	4	–	7
Syracuse	0	–	7	1	–	10
$ – BCS representative as conference champion; Rankings from AP Poll

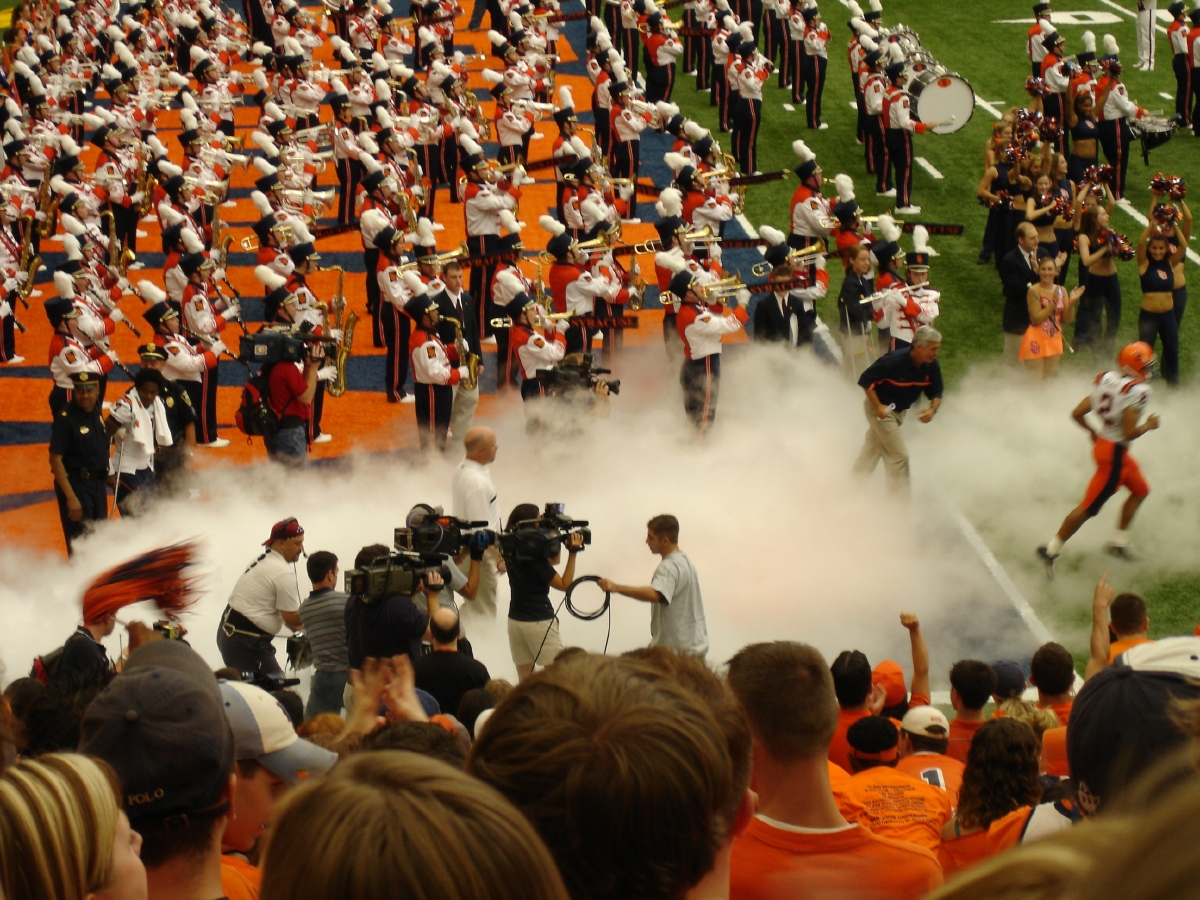
Syracuse Football 2005 Opener

The 2005 Syracuse Orange football team represented Syracuse University during the 2005 NCAA Division I-A football season. The Orange were coached by first-year head coach Greg Robinson and played their home games at the Carrier Dome in Syracuse, New York.

In 2015, Syracuse vacated the one win from this season among others from the 2004 to 2006 seasons following an eight-year NCAA investigation, as the NCAA found that some football players who committed academic fraud participated in the wins.

== Schedule ==
Date	Time	Opponent	Site	TV	Result	Attendance
September 4	1:30 pm	West Virginia	Carrier Dome; Syracuse, NY (rivalry)	ABC	L 7–15	45,418
September 10	3:30 pm	Buffalo*	Carrier Dome; Syracuse, NY	ESPN+	W 31–0 (vacated)	34,442
September 17	12:00 pm	No. 25 Virginia*	Carrier Dome; Syracuse, NY	ESPN2	L 24–27	40,027
October 1	3:30 pm	at No. 6 Florida State*	Doak Campbell Stadium; Tallahassee, FL	ABC	L 14–38	83,717
October 7	8:00 pm	at Connecticut	Rentschler Field; East Hartford, CT (rivalry)	ESPN2	L 7–26	40,000
October 15	12:00 pm	Rutgers	Carrier Dome; Syracuse, NY	ESPN+	L 9–31	39,022
October 22	12:00 pm	at Pittsburgh	Heinz Field; Pittsburgh, PA (rivalry)	ESPN+	L 17–34	33,059
October 29	12:00 pm	Cincinnati	Carrier Dome; Syracuse, NY	ESPN+	L 16–22	42,457
November 12	1:30 pm	South Florida^{†}	Carrier Dome; Syracuse, NY		L 0–27	40,144
November 19	2:30 pm	at No. 6 Notre Dame*	Notre Dame Stadium; Notre Dame, IN	NBC	L 10–34	80,795
November 26	3:30 pm	at No. 17 Louisville	Papa John's Cardinal Stadium; Louisville, KY	ESPNU	L 17–41	37,896
*Non-conference game; ^{†}Homecoming; Rankings from AP Poll released prior to the game; All times are in Eastern time
