= 2005 Louisville Cardinals football team =

American college football season

2005 Louisville Cardinals football

Gator Bowl, L 24–35 vs. Virginia Tech
- Conference: Big East Conference

Ranking
- Coaches: No. 20
- AP: No. 19
- Record: 9–3 (5–2 Big East)
- Head coach: Bobby Petrino (3rd season)
- Offensive coordinator: Paul Petrino (3rd season)
- Offensive scheme: Multiple
- Defensive coordinator: Mike Cassity (2nd season)
- Base defense: 4–3
- Home stadium: Papa John's Cardinal Stadium

2005 Big East Conference football standings
	Conf.			Overall
Team	W		L	W		L
No. 5 West Virginia $	7	–	0	11	–	1
No. 19 Louisville	5	–	2	9	–	3
Rutgers	4	–	3	7	–	5
South Florida	4	–	3	6	–	6
Pittsburgh	4	–	3	5	–	6
Connecticut	2	–	5	5	–	6
Cincinnati	2	–	5	4	–	7
Syracuse	0	–	7	1	–	10
$ – BCS representative as conference champion; Rankings from AP Poll

The 2005 Louisville Cardinals football team represented the University of Louisville in the 2005 NCAA Division I-A football season. The team, led by Bobby Petrino in his third year at the school, played their home games in Papa John's Cardinal Stadium. They finished 9–3 in their first season as a member of the Big East Conference with a 5–2 conference record.

== Schedule ==
Date	Time	Opponent	Rank	Site	TV	Result	Attendance
September 4	3:30 p.m.	at Kentucky*	No. 12	Commonwealth Stadium; Lexington, KY (Governor's Cup)	ESPN Classic	W 31–24	70,752
September 17	12:00 p.m.	Oregon State*	No. 11	Papa John's Cardinal Stadium; Louisville, KY	ESPN	W 63–27	42,647
September 24	6:45 p.m.	at South Florida	No. 9	Raymond James Stadium; Tampa, FL	ESPNU	L 14–45	33,586
October 1	12:00 p.m.	Florida Atlantic*	No. 24	Papa John's Cardinal Stadium; Louisville, KY	ESPN Plus	W 61–10	40,219
October 8	4:30 p.m.	North Carolina*	No. 23	Papa John's Cardinal Stadium; Louisville, KY	WHAS	W 69–14	41,334
October 15	3:30 p.m.	at West Virginia	No. 19	Milan Puskar Stadium; Morgantown, WV	ABC	L 44–46 ^{3OT}	59,797
October 22	12:00 p.m.	at Cincinnati		Nippert Stadium; Cincinnati, OH (The Keg of Nails)	ESPNU	W 46–22	21,086
November 3	7:30 p.m.	Pittsburgh	No. 24	Papa John's Cardinal Stadium; Louisville, KY	ESPN	W 42–20	42,692
November 11	8:00 p.m.	Rutgers	No. 23	Papa John's Cardinal Stadium; Louisville, KY	ESPN2	W 56–5	41,219
November 26	3:30 p.m.	Syracuse	No. 17	Papa John's Cardinal Stadium; Louisville, KY	ESPNU	W 41–17	37,896
December 3	7:45 p.m.	at Connecticut	No. 16	Rentschler Field; East Hartford, CT	ESPN	W 30–20	40,000
January 2	12:30 p.m.	vs. No. 12 Virginia Tech*	No. 15	Alltel Stadium; Jacksonville, FL (Gator Bowl)	NBC	L 24–35	63,780
*Non-conference game; Rankings from AP Poll released prior to the game; All times are in Eastern time

== Personnel ==
=== Coaching staff ===
2005 Louisville Cardinals coaching staff
Name	Position
Bobby Petrino	Head coach
Greg Nord	Assistant head coach / tight ends / running backs coach
Mike Cassity	Defensive coordinator / safeties coach
Paul Petrino	Offensive coordinator / wide receivers coach
Jeff Brohm	Quarterbacks coach
Reggie Johnson	Inside linebackers coach
Tony Levine	Outside linebackers coach / special teams coordinator
Mike Summers	Offensive line coach
Joe Whitt Jr.	Cornerbacks coach / recruiting coordinator
Kevin Wolthausen	Defensive line coach

=== Roster ===
2005 Louisville Cardinals football team roster
Players
Coaches
Offense

Pos.	#	Name	Class
TE	82	Gary Barnidge	So
QB	12	Brian Brohm	So
G	59	Jason Spitz	Sr

Defense

Pos.	#	Name	Class
DE	58	Elvis Dumervil	Sr

Special teams

Pos.	#	Name	Class

Head coach

- Bobby Petrino

Coordinators/assistant coaches

Legend

- (C) Team captain
- (S) Suspended
- (I) Ineligible
- Injured
- Redshirt

Roster
