= Michael Warren II =

American football player (born 1998)

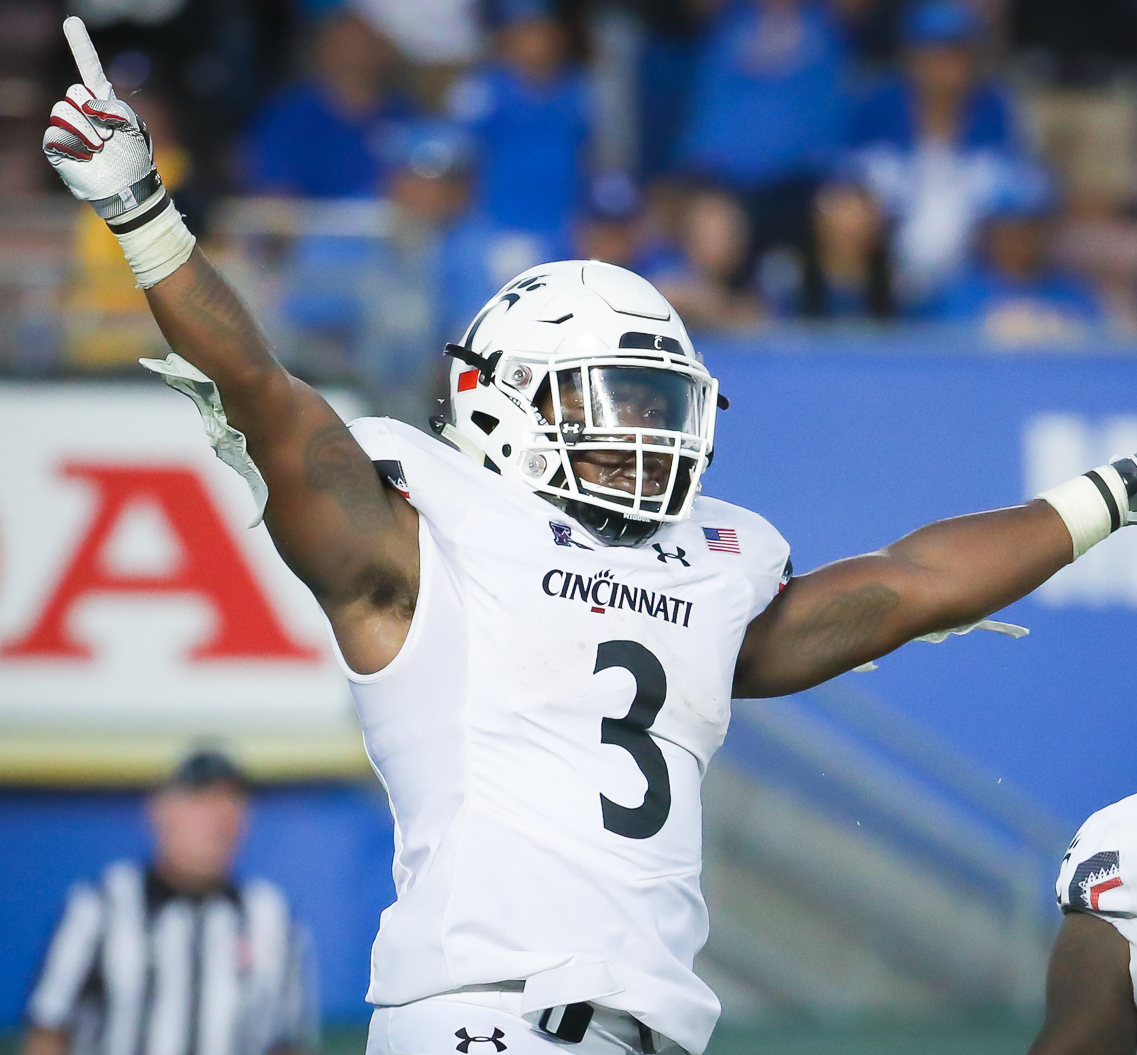
- Warren with the Cincinnati Bearcats in 2018

No. 40
- Position: Running back

Personal information
- Born: November 12, 1998 (age 28); Toledo, Ohio, U.S.
- Listed height: 5 ft 11 in (1.80 m)
- Listed weight: 222 lb (101 kg)

Career information
- High school: Central Catholic (Toledo)
- College: Cincinnati
- NFL draft: 2020: undrafted

Career history
- Philadelphia Eagles (2020)*; Carolina Panthers (2020)*; Washington Football Team (2020); Detroit Lions (2021)*; BC Lions (2022)
- * Offseason or practice squad member only

Awards and highlights
- 2× second-team All-AAC (2018, 2019)
- Stats at Pro Football Reference

Michael Warren II (born November 12, 1998) is an American former football running back. In high school, he won Ohio's Mr. Football Award while playing for Central Catholic in Toledo. He attended the University of Cincinnati and played for the Bearcats, where he holds their single-season rushing touchdowns record. He signed with the Philadelphia Eagles as an undrafted free agent in 2020 and has also been a member of the Carolina Panthers and Washington Football Team.

== Early life ==
He went to high school at Central Catholic High School in Toledo, Ohio. He was honored as Mr. Football Award (Ohio) in 2016. He averaged 8.95 yards per carry that season and holds the school’s single-game rushing record with 385 yards against Lima Senior High School in 2016.

== College career ==
At University of Cincinnati, he played running back and kick returner in his freshman year. On November 10, 2018, in a game against the University of Central Florida, he rushed for three touchdowns and caught a touchdown pass. He set a school record of 19 touchdowns in a single season, and became the school's 12th 1,000-yard rusher. The most recent was George Winn in 2012.

In 2019 he passed Robert Cooper to become the 6th ranked all-time rusher for the Bearcats, with a career total of 2,918 yards. Following this season, Warren declared for the 2020 NFL draft, forgoing his senior year.

=== College statistics ===
Season	Team	Games	Rushing				Receiving			
Season	Team	Games	Att	Yards	Avg	TD	Rec	Yards	Avg	TD
2017	Cincinnati	12	54	324	6.0	1	5	57	11.4	0
2018	Cincinnati	12	244	1,329	5.4	19	25	232	9.3	1
2019	Cincinnati	14	261	1,265	4.8	14	21	153	7.3	2
Career		38	559	2,918	5.2	34	51	442	8.7	3

== Professional career ==
Pre-draft measurables
Height	Weight	Arm length	Hand span	Wingspan	Bench press
5 ft 9 1/8 in (1.76 m)	226 lb (103 kg)	29 1/2 in (0.75 m)	9 1/8 in (0.23 m)	5 ft 11 1/2 in (1.82 m)	16 reps
All values from NFL Combine

=== Philadelphia Eagles ===
Warren was signed by the Philadelphia Eagles as an undrafted free agent following the 2020 NFL draft on April 26, 2020. He was waived on September 3, 2020 and re-signed to the practice squad. He was released on September 29, 2020.

=== Carolina Panthers ===
On October 20, 2020, Warren was signed to the Carolina Panthers' practice squad, but was released two days later.

=== Washington Football Team ===
Warren signed with the Washington Football Team's practice squad on December 9, 2020. He was elevated to the active roster on December 19 for the team's week 15 game against the Seattle Seahawks, and reverted to the practice squad after the game. He was released on December 29, 2020, and rejoined them on a reserve/futures contract on January 15, 2021, before being waived again on April 9, 2021.

=== Detroit Lions ===
Warren signed with the Detroit Lions on June 4, 2021. He was waived/injured on August 11, 2021 and placed on injured reserve. He was released on August 16.

== See also ==
- Cincinnati Bearcats football statistical leaders
