= 2005 Pittsburgh Panthers football team =

American college football season

2005 Pittsburgh Panthers football
- Conference: Big East Conference
- Record: 5–6 (4–3 Big East)
- Head coach: Dave Wannstedt (1st season)
- Offensive coordinator: Matt Cavanaugh (1st season)
- Offensive scheme: Pro-style
- Defensive coordinator: Paul Rhoads (6th season)
- Base defense: 4–3
- Home stadium: Heinz Field

2005 Big East Conference football standings
	Conf.			Overall
Team	W		L	W		L
No. 5 West Virginia $	7	–	0	11	–	1
No. 19 Louisville	5	–	2	9	–	3
Rutgers	4	–	3	7	–	5
South Florida	4	–	3	6	–	6
Pittsburgh	4	–	3	5	–	6
Connecticut	2	–	5	5	–	6
Cincinnati	2	–	5	4	–	7
Syracuse	0	–	7	1	–	10
$ – BCS representative as conference champion; Rankings from AP Poll

The 2005 Pittsburgh Panthers football team represented the University of Pittsburgh in the 2005 NCAA Division I-A football season.

== Schedule ==
Date	Time	Opponent	Rank	Site	TV	Result	Attendance	Source
September 3	8:00 p.m.	Notre Dame*	No. 23	Heinz Field; Pittsburgh, PA (rivalry, College GameDay)	ABC	L 21–42	66,451	
September 9	8:00 p.m.	at Ohio*		Peden Stadium; Athens, OH	ESPN2	L 10–16 ^{OT}	24,545	
September 17	3:30 p.m.	at Nebraska*		Memorial Stadium; Lincoln, NE	ABC	L 6–7	77,336	
September 24	2:00 p.m.	Youngstown State*		Heinz Field; Pittsburgh, PA		W 41–0	43,135	
September 30	8:00 p.m.	at Rutgers		Rutgers Stadium; Piscataway, NJ	ESPN2	L 29–37	37,514	
October 8	2:00 p.m.	Cincinnati		Heinz Field; Pittsburgh, PA		W 38–20	30,343	
October 15	2:00 p.m.	South Florida		Heinz Field; Pittsburgh, PA	ESPN360	W 31–17	33,497	
October 22	12:00 p.m.	Syracuse^{†}		Heinz Field; Pittsburgh, PA (rivalry)	ESPN Plus	W 34–17	33,059	
November 3	7:30 p.m.	at No. 25 Louisville		Papa John's Cardinal Stadium; Louisville, KY	ESPN	L 20–42	42,692	
November 12	12:00 p.m.	Connecticut		Heinz Field; Pittsburgh, PA	ESPN Plus	W 24–0	35,145	
November 24	8:00 p.m.	at No. 11 West Virginia		Milan Puskar Stadium; Morgantown, WV (Backyard Brawl)	ESPN	L 13–45	52,997	
*Non-conference game; ^{†}Homecoming; Rankings from AP Poll released prior to the game; All times are in Eastern time

== Coaching staff ==
2005 Pittsburgh Panthers football staff
Coaching staff: Dave Wannstedt – Head coach; Bob Junko – Assistant head coach/defensive tackles; Matt Cavanaugh – Offensive coordinator/quarterbacks; Paul Rhoads – Defensive coordinator/secondary; Curtis Bray – Linebackers; Paul Dunn – Offensive line; Greg Gattuso – Tight ends/recruiting coordinator; Aubrey Hill – Receivers; Charlie Partridge – Defensive ends/Special teams; David Walker – Running backs	Support staff: Chris LaSala – Assistant Athletic Director/football operations; Mike Antonoplos – Recruiting Assistant; Scott McCurley – Graduate assistant; Jeff Ambrosie – Graduate assistant; Zen Bliss – Under Grad Intern (Offense)	Strength and conditioning staff: Mike Kent – Strength and conditioning coach; Darren Honeycutt – Assistant strength and conditioning coach

== Team players drafted into the NFL ==
Player	Position	Round	Pick	NFL club
Charles Spencer	Guard	3	65	Houston Texans
Josh Lay	Defensive back	6	174	New Orleans Saints
