= Kevin Lovell =

American football player (born 1984)

No. 2
- Position: Placekicker

Personal information
- Born: April 14, 1984 (age 42); Hawthorne, California, U.S.
- Listed height: 5 ft 9 in (1.75 m)
- Listed weight: 155 lb (70 kg)

Career information
- College: Cincinnati
- NFL draft: 2007: undrafted

Career history
- St. Louis Rams (2007)*; Atlanta Falcons (2008)*; Florida Tuskers (2009)*
- * Offseason or practice squad member only

Kevin Lovell (born April 14, 1984) is an American former football placekicker. He was signed by the St. Louis Rams as an undrafted free agent in 2007. He played college football at Cincinnati.

Lovell was also a member of the Atlanta Falcons and Florida Tuskers.

== Early life ==
Lovell earned first-team all-state, all-area, all-region and all-CIF as a senior at Mira Costa High School in 2001, under the coaching of Don Morrow, he made 15-of-16 field goals and 54-of-55 PATs as a senior to finish with 99 points, he was a four-year regular in soccer who didn't venture into football until his senior year, Lovell competed in the pole vault in track and field, also he did volunteer work at an animal clinic.

== College career ==
In 2004, Lovell was the Bearcats Special Teams Player of the Year award-winner and joined team in preseason practice after a year in the junior college ranks. Was UC scoring leader with 72 points also kicked FGs of 27 and 25 yards vs. Ohio State, he had a 49-yard FG vs. UAB Blazers converted on all three FG attempts in the win over Marshall in the Fort Worth Bowl, he made 11 of 15 FGs with two misses from 50+, he earned his first letter .

During 2005 season, Lovell was the team's second-leading scorer and made all 18 PAT tries . He was 4-of-9 in field goals, but three of his misses were from 45 or more yards out, also he earned his second letter.

In 2006, he continued as an extremely accurate and dependable kicker who added range to his kicks through strength training and technique improvement, was the team scoring leader with 73 points, he was perfect on all 25 PAT tries to extend his streak to 79, setting a new UC record, he has made his last nine FG tries, the third-longest streak in UC history. Lovell tied a school single game record with four field goals against Connecticut, he booted the game-winner with 10 seconds to play, earning Big East Conference Special Teams Player of the Week and team Special Teams Player of the Week honors. Lovell was 3-for-3 in FGs and had 12 points in the upset of No. 7 Rutgers, earning team co-Special Teams Player of the Week honors, also kicked a 47-yard FG against West Virginia copped the Special Teams Player of the Week awards for the Virginia Tech and Akron games. He made his first five FGs of the season. He is a Bearcat Academic Honor Roll (Fall 2004, Fall 2005, Spring 2006).

== Professional career ==
Lovell was signed as an undrafted free agent by the St. Louis Rams on May 7, 2007, but later he was waived.

He was signed by the Atlanta Falcons on April 24, 2008, and competed with the team in offseason training activities (OTAs) and training camp. He was waived prior the start of the preseason on August 7.

Lovell was signed by the Florida Tuskers of the United Football League on August 17, 2009. He was released by the team prior to their first game, when the team signed veteran kicker Matt Bryant.

== Personal ==
Lovell has a twin brother, Keith, who played soccer at Humboldt State.
