= Gunner Kiel =

American football player (born 1993)

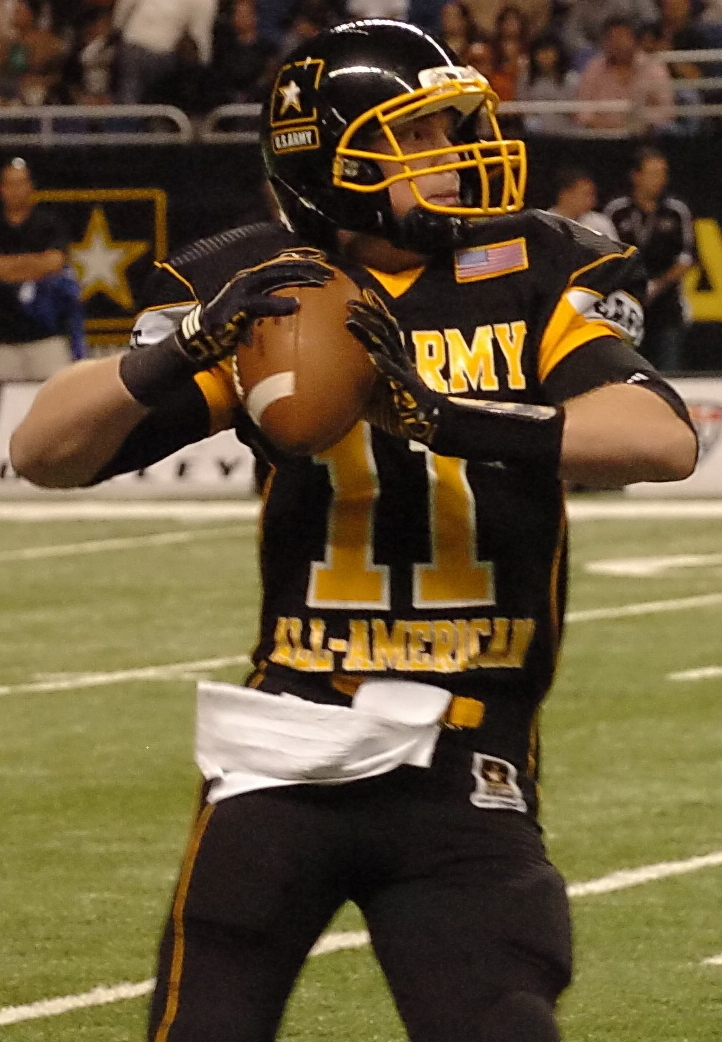
- Kiel at the U.S. Army All-American Bowl, 2012

No. 11
- Position: Quarterback

Personal information
- Born: July 23, 1993 (age 33); Columbus, Indiana, U.S.
- Listed height: 6 ft 4 in (1.93 m)
- Listed weight: 215 lb (98 kg)

Career information
- High school: Columbus East
- College: Notre Dame (2012); Cincinnati (2013–2016)
- NFL draft: 2017: undrafted
- Stats at Pro Football Reference

Gunner Trey Kiel (born July 23, 1993) is an American former football quarterback. He played college football for the Notre Dame Fighting Irish and later for the Cincinnati Bearcats.

== Early life ==
Kiel attended Columbus East High School in Columbus, Indiana. He played on the Columbus East football team. As a senior in 2011, he won the Indiana Mr. Football Award.

Kiel was considered the best quarterback recruit in the nation by the Rivals.com and Scout.com recruiting networks.

== College career ==
Kiel originally committed to Indiana University Bloomington, before decommitting and committing to Louisiana State University. He then decommitted and officially enrolled at the University of Notre Dame on January 17, 2012.

After spending the 2012 season on the depth chart behind Everett Golson, Tommy Rees, and Andrew Hendrix, Kiel announced his decision to transfer from Notre Dame.

On April 10, 2013, Kiel announced he would transfer to the University of Cincinnati for the 2013 season. After sitting out the 2013 season as required by NCAA transfer rules, Kiel made his college debut on September 12, 2014, against the Toledo Rockets. He threw six touchdown passes in that game, the most by an FBS quarterback in a first game. Kiel finished the season with 3,254 passing yards, second most in the American Athletic Conference. His 31 touchdown passes led the conference and tied the school record. Kiel was 18 yards short of moving into a tie for 2nd place on Cincinnati's all-time single season passing yards list when he exited the Military Bowl in the third quarter with a head injury.

Kiel began the 2015 season as Cincinnati's starter. He was plagued with injuries throughout the year, being replaced by backup Hayden Moore on several occasions. Kiel missed two games after being hospitalized with a head injury in Cincinnati's game against Memphis. He did not travel with the team to their bowl game in Hawaii, citing personal problems.

Prior to the 2016 season, Cincinnati head coach, Tommy Tuberville, announced that Kiel, now a fifth-year senior, would be the third-string quarterback behind sophomore Hayden Moore (starter) and redshirt freshman Ross Trail (second-string). On October 20, Kiel was named the starter for Cincinnati's homecoming game against East Carolina after Hayden Moore went down with injury. He started the next three games but was benched again when Moore returned from injury.

=== College statistics ===
Year	Team	Games			Passing								Rushing			
Year	Team	GP	GS	Record	Cmp	Att	Pct	Yds	Avg	TD	Int	Rtg	Att	Yds	Avg	TD
2012	Notre Dame	0	0	—	(redshirt) Redshirted											
2013	Cincinnati	0	0	—	Did not play due to NCAA transfer rules											
2014	Cincinnati	13	13	9−4	233	390	59.7	3,254	8.3	31	13	149.4	63	142	2.3	1
2015	Cincinnati	10	10	6−4	206	316	65.2	2,777	8.8	19	11	151.9	32	27	0.8	2
2016	Cincinnati	5	3	1−2	66	127	52.0	804	6.3	6	2	117.6	7	−4	−0.6	0
Career		28	26	16−10	505	833	60.6	6,835	8.2	56	26	145.5	102	165	1.6	3

== Personal life ==
Gunner's uncle, Blair Kiel (1961–2012), was a quarterback at Notre Dame and played in the National Football League, His brother Drew Kiel was QB for Illinois State, and brother Dusty Kiel was a QB for Indiana University.
