= Armon Binns =

American gridiron football player and coach (born 1989)

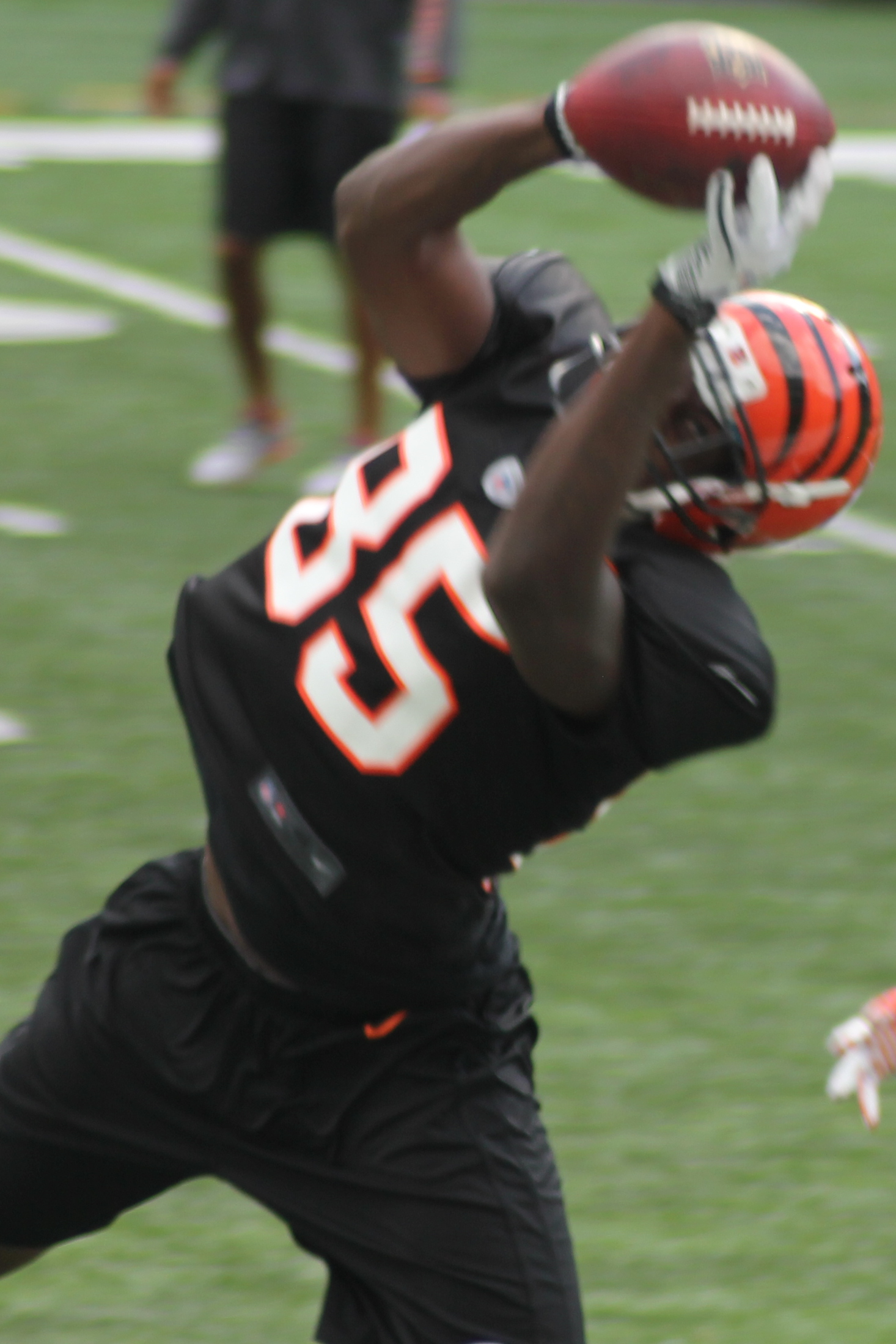
- At Cincinnati Bengals training camp

Current position
- Title: Wide receivers coach
- Team: Northwestern
- Conference: Big Ten

Biographical details
- Born: September 8, 1989 (age 37); Los Angeles, California, U.S.
- Education: Cincinnati

Playing career
- 2007–2010: Cincinnati
- 2011*: Jacksonville Jaguars
- 2011–2012: Cincinnati Bengals
- 2012–2013: Miami Dolphins
- 2014–2015: Kansas City Chiefs*
- 2016–2017: Ottawa Redblacks*
- Position: Wide receiver

Coaching career (HC unless noted)
- 2018: Notre Dame (OA)
- 2019: Hampton (WR)
- 2020–2021: Cincinnati (QC)
- 2022: Youngstown State (WR)
- 2023–present: Northwestern (WR)

Accomplishments and honors

Awards
- As player: 2× First-team Little All-American (2009, 2010); First-team All-Big East (2010)

Armon Tyrae Binns (born September 8, 1989) is an American football coach and former wide receiver. He is currently the wide receivers coach for the Northwestern Wildcats. He played college football at Cincinnati. Binns was signed by the Jacksonville Jaguars as an undrafted free agent in 2011. He has also been a member of the Cincinnati Bengals, Miami Dolphins, Kansas City Chiefs, and Ottawa Redblacks.

== Early life ==
Binns graduated from Pasadena High School in 2007, where he starred in football and basketball. Binns and his wife, Lauren, who has a bachelor's degree from UC Berkeley, have three children—Noah, Eli, and Eden. They started dating when Armon was a junior at the University of Cincinnati; they were married in 2011.

== College career ==
As a wide receiver for the Cincinnati Bearcats, Binns finished the 2009 season with 61 receptions for 888 yards and 11 touchdowns. He was on the watch list for the Biletnikoff Award during the 2009 season. He scored a touchdown on a 29-yard pass from Tony Pike for the go-ahead score with 33 seconds left in the 2009 River City Rivalry against the University of Pittsburgh, which the Bearcats won 45-44.

Binns started all 12 games as a senior and posted a team-high 75 receptions for 1,101 yards with 10 touchdowns. He also led the Big East in receptions, receiving yards, receptions per game (6.2) and receiving yards per game (91.8).

=== Statistics ===
| Season | Team | GP | Receiving | | | | |
| Season | Team | GP | Rec | Yds | Avg | Lng | TD |
|---|---|---|---|---|---|---|---|
| 2007 | Cincinnati | 7 | 1 | 9 | 9.0 | 9 | 0 |
| 2008 | Cincinnati | 9 | 1 | 10 | 10.0 | 10 | 0 |
| 2009 | Cincinnati | 13 | 61 | 888 | 14.6 | 81 | 11 |
| 2010 | Cincinnati | 12 | 75 | 1,101 | 14.7 | 62 | 10 |
| Career | | 36 | 138 | 2,008 | 14.6 | 81 | 21 |

== Professional career ==
=== Cincinnati Bengals ===
Binns was signed to the Cincinnati Bengals' practice squad on September 20, 2011. He saw game action in the 2012 season, playing in seven games (five as a starter) with 18 receptions for 210 receiving yards and one touchdown.

=== Miami Dolphins ===
Binns was claimed off waivers by the Miami Dolphins on December 10, 2012. Playing for the Dolphins the remainder of the season, Binns caught six passes for 67 yards.

On July 28, 2013, Binns suffered a torn ACL and MCL during the Dolphins' training camp, forcing him to miss the entire 2013 season. On July 31, 2013, Binns was waived/injured by the Miami Dolphins. Binns was placed on Injured/Reserve on August 1, 2013. The Dolphins released Binns on August 26, 2014.

=== Kansas City Chiefs ===
The Kansas City Chiefs signed Binns to their practice squad on September 8, 2014. On December 31, 2014, Binns signed a futures contract with the Chiefs.

=== Ottawa Redblacks ===
On February 3, 2016, Binns signed a contract with the Ottawa Redblacks of the Canadian Football League.

== Coaching career ==
For the 2018 season, Binns joined the staff of his college head coach Brian Kelly at Notre Dame as an offensive analyst. Binns would help mentor Miles Boykin during his time in South Bend.

In 2019 Binns joined Hampton as their wide receivers coach, before returning to his alma mater the University of Cincinnati as a quality control coach for the 2020 season.

After two seasons at Cincinnati, Binns was hired as the receivers coach at Youngstown State in March 2022. During his time at Youngstown, Binns coached star wide receiver Bryce Oliver and helped him to become a first team all conference player. After helping lead a remarkable comeback season for the Penguins in 2022, Binns was hired as the wide receivers coach at Northwestern by Pat Fitzgerald.
