= D. J. Woods =

American gridiron football player (born 1989)

Profile
- Position: Wide receiver

Personal information
- Born: November 29, 1989 (age 36)
- Listed height: 6 ft 0 in (1.83 m)
- Listed weight: 185 lb (84 kg)

Career information
- High school: Strongsville (Strongsville, Ohio)
- College: Cincinnati (2008–2011)
- NFL draft: 2012: undrafted

Career history
- Tennessee Titans (2012)*; BC Lions (2012)*; Chicago Rush (2013); Ottawa Redblacks (2014)*; San Jose SaberCats (2015)*
- * Offseason or practice squad member only

Awards and highlights
- Second-team All-Big East (2010)

Career AFL statistics
- Receptions: 19
- Receiving yards: 323
- Receiving TDs: 4
- Tackles: 5.5
- Stats at ArenaFan.com

Derrick L. Woods, Jr. (born November 29, 1989) is an American former football wide receiver. He played college football at the University of Cincinnati. Professionally, he was a member of the Tennessee Titans, BC Lions, Chicago Rush, Ottawa Redblacks, and San Jose SaberCats.

== Early life ==
Derrick L. Woods, Jr. was born on November 29, 1989. He played high school football at Strongsville High School in Strongsville, Ohio as a wide receiver and defensive back. He caught 35 passes for 750 yards and eight touchdowns his junior year. He recorded 38 receptions as a senior in 2007 before missing the final five games of the season due to injury. Wood garnered Associated Press second-team Division I All-Ohio recognition for the 2007 season. Overall, he caught 153 passes for 1,797 yards and 18 touchdowns during his high school career while also returning five kickoffs for touchdowns and three punts for touchdowns.

== College career ==
Woods played college football for the Cincinnati Bearcats of the University of Cincinnati from 2008 to 2011. He played in all 14 games as a true freshman in 2008, catching 14 passes for 168 yards while also returning 12 punts for 113 yards. He started 12 games for the Bearcats during the 2009 season, recording 51 receptions for 640 yards and four touchdowns. As a junior in 2010, Woods totaled 57 catches for 898 yards and eight touchdowns, 32 kick returns for 728 yards, and 19 punt returns for 146 yards. He was named second-team All-Big East for the 2010 season. He caught 37 passes for 450 yards and two touchdowns his senior year in 2011 while also returning 11 punts for 71 yards.

== Professional career ==
Woods signed with the Tennessee Titans of the National Football League (NFL) on May 3, 2012, after going undrafted in the 2012 NFL draft. He was released on September 1, 2012.

Woods was signed to the practice roster of the BC Lions of the Canadian Football League (CFL) in October 2012.

Woods was assigned to the Chicago Rush of the Arena Football League (AFL) on May 16, 2013. He recorded 19 catches for 232 yards and four touchdowns, five solo tackles, and one assisted tackle, for the Rush during the 2013 season. He was placed on the suspended list on July 11, 2013.

Woods signed with the expansion Ottawa Redblacks of the CFL on February 13, 2014.

Woods was assigned to the San Jose SaberCats of the AFL on October 27, 2014. He was placed on recallable reassignment on January 26, 2015.
