= Jonathan Ruffin =

American gridiron football player (born 1981)

No. 16
- Position: Placekicker

Personal information
- Born: August 1, 1981 (age 45)
- Listed height: 5 ft 11 in (1.80 m)
- Listed weight: 174 lb (79 kg)

Career information
- High school: Ridgewood (Metairie, Louisiana)
- College: Cincinnati (1999–2002)
- NFL draft: 2003: undrafted

Career history
- Pittsburgh Steelers (2003)*; Dallas Cowboys (2004)*; → Berlin Thunder (2004): Hamilton Tiger-Cats (2006)*; New Orleans VooDoo (2007–2008); Milwaukee Mustangs (2011)*; New Orleans VooDoo (2011)
- * Offseason or practice squad member only

Awards and highlights
- Lou Groza Award (2000); Consensus All-American (2000); C-USA Special Teams Player of the Year (2000); First-team All-C-USA (2000)

Jonathan Ruffin (born August 1, 1981) is an American former football placekicker who played three seasons in the Arena Football League (AFL). He played college football for the Cincinnati Bearcats, where he won the Lou Groza Award and was recognized as an All-American. He was signed by the Pittsburgh Steelers as an undrafted free agent in 2003, and he played for the Berlin Thunder of NFL Europe and the New Orleans VooDoo of the AFL.

== College career ==
Ruffin attended the University of Cincinnati, where he played for the Cincinnati Bearcats football team from 1999 to 2002. As a sophomore in 2000, he earned recognition as a consensus first-team All-American, and won the Lou Groza Award as the outstanding college placekicker in America.

== Professional career ==
Ruffin was signed by the Pittsburgh Steelers as an undrafted free agent following the 2003 NFL draft on April 29, 2003. He was waived on August 22. He was signed by the Dallas Cowboys on January 8, 2004, and was allocated to NFL Europe to play for Berlin Thunder on January 30. After returning to the Cowboys, he was released on August 13, 2004. He was signed by the Hamilton Tiger-Cats of the Canadian Football League on June 28, 2006, before being released.

Ruffin was signed by the New Orleans VooDoo on May 25, 2007. He made 39-of-41 extra point attempts in 2007, and was re-signed on August 15, 2007. After the 2008 season, the VooDoo franchise folded. The franchise was revived in time for the 2011 season, and Ruffin re-signed with the team on September 27, 2010, after not playing football for two years. Due to a contract conflict with a new job, Ruffin was placed on team suspension in July 2011.

On September 27, 2010, Ruffin was assigned to the Milwaukee Mustangs.
