= Jon Olinger =

American football player (born 1980)

No. 84
- Position: Wide receiver

Personal information
- Born: August 24, 1980 (age 46); Hazard, Kentucky, U.S.
- Listed height: 6 ft 3 in (1.91 m)
- Listed weight: 222 lb (101 kg)

Career information
- High school: Hazard
- College: Cincinnati (1998–2002)
- NFL draft: 2003: 5th round, 159th overall pick

Career history
- Atlanta Falcons (2003)*; Carolina Panthers (2004)*; → Rhein Fire (2004)
- * Offseason or practice squad member only

Jonathan Edward Olinger (born August 24, 1980) is an American former football wide receiver. He played college football for the Cincinnati Bearcats, and was selected by the Atlanta Falcons in the fifth round of the 2003 NFL draft.

== Early life ==
Jonathan Edward Olinger was born on August 24, 1980, in Hazard, Kentucky. He mostly played basketball growing up and did not play high school football until his junior year at Hazard High School. He caught four touchdowns during his first game. As a senior, Olinger set a state record with 22 receiving touchdowns. He also finished fifth in the state high jump during high school.

== College career ==
Olinger enrolled at the University of Cincinnati to play college football for the Cincinnati Bearcats. He had also planned on playing basketball with the Bearcats but never did. He redshirted the 1998 football season, was a four-year letterman from 1999 to 2002, and a two-year starter from 2001 to 2002. He caught five passes for 63 yards in 1999, three passes for 23 yards in 2000, 27 passes for 469 yards and seven touchdowns in 2001, and 54 passes for 1,114 yards and seven touchdowns in 2002. His 1,114 yards led Conference USA and set Cincinnati's single-season record. He also tied the school's single-game receptions record with 13 catches against the Miami RedHawks on October 5, 2002.

== Professional career ==
Olinger was selected by the Atlanta Falcons in the fifth round, with the 159th overall pick, of the 2003 NFL draft. In grading the draft, The Houston Chronicle gave the Falcons an "F" and stated that Olinger was "nothing special". The Atlanta Constitution said that Olinger was a "nice target at 6 feet 3, with decent speed and a knack for snatching the clutch bomb". On June 18, he signed a three-year deal worth over $1 million with a $110,000 signing bonus. Olinger was one of 11 receivers at Falcons' training camp. On August 4, he was listed as the third-string "Z" receiver behind Brian Finneran and MarTay Jenkins. Olinger was released on August 30, 2003, before the start of the regular season.

On December 30, 2003, Olinger signed a futures contract with the Carolina Panthers. He was allocated to NFL Europe to play for the Rhein Fire. He played in two games for the Fire during the 2004 NFL Europe season but did not record any statistics. Olinger was released by the Panthers on September 5, 2004, before the start of the NFL regular season.

== Personal life ==
In 2016, Olinger was arrested and charged with facilitating robbery and tampering with physical evidence after allegedly robbing a Dollar General in Hazard, Kentucky, with a gun.

== See also ==
- Cincinnati Bearcats football statistical leaders
