= Reggie Taylor (Canadian football) =

American gridiron football player (born 1964)

Profile
- Position: Running back

Personal information
- Born: February 8, 1964 (age 62); Los Angeles, California, U.S.

Career information
- College: Cincinnati
- NFL draft: 1987: 11 / Pick 280th round

Career history
- 1988: BC Lions
- 1989–1991: Edmonton Eskimos

Awards and highlights
- CFL All-Star (1989); 2× CFL West All-Star (1989, 1990); Eddie James Memorial Trophy (1989); CFL rushing yards leader (1989)

Reggie Taylor (born February 8, 1964) was a Canadian Football League (CFL) running back for the BC Lions and for the Edmonton Eskimos from 1988 through 1991. He was selected by the Tampa Bay Buccaneers in the 11th round of the 1987 NFL draft with the 280th overall pick. He was an All-Star in 1989 and won the Eddie James Memorial Trophy that same year. Taylor played college football at the University of Cincinnati.
