= LaDaris Vann =

American gridiron football player (born 1980)

No. 8, 16
- Position: Wide receiver

Personal information
- Born: October 7, 1980 (age 46); Middle Bass, Ohio, U.S.
- Listed height: 5 ft 11 in (1.80 m)
- Listed weight: 218 lb (99 kg)

Career information
- High school: Spanish River Community (FL)
- College: Cincinnati

Career history
- Winnipeg Blue Bombers (2003); Indiana Firebirds (2004)*; Buffalo Bills (2005); → Berlin Thunder (2005)*; → Frankfurt Galaxy (2005); B.C. Lions (2007)*
- * Offseason or practice squad member only

Awards and highlights
- Conference USA Co-Offensive Freshman of the Year (1999); 2× First-team All-Conference USA (2001, 2002)

LaDaris Tremaine Vann (born October 7, 1980) is an American former professional football wide receiver in the Canadian Football League (CFL) for the Winnipeg Blue Bombers. He played college football at the University of Cincinnati. He also played for the Frankfurt Galaxy in NFL Europe.

== Early life ==
Vann attended Fort Pierce Central High School. As a sophomore, he did not play football. As a junior, he was named the starter at quarterback. He also practiced baseball and basketball.

As a senior in 1998, he was suspended for 10 days for having an altercation with a teacher, which also affected his NCAA Division I scholarship offers. He decided to transfer to Spanish River Community High School after the incident.

Vann earned the starter position at quarterback, where he was a part of a backfield that included future professional football players Lance Frazier and Jason Geathers. He only played in the first 4 games of the season, after the Florida High School Activities Association (FHSAA) ruled him ineligible due to not meeting transfer requirements.

He received interest from the Atlanta Braves to play Minor League Baseball, but chose to enroll in college.

== College career ==
Vann accepted a football scholarship from the University of Cincinnati. As a redshirt freshman, he was converted into a wide receiver. He appeared in 11 games as the third receiver, ahead of fellow freshman Antonio Chatman. He registered 37 receptions (third on the team) for 547 yards (led the team), 14.8-yard average and 4 receiving touchdowns (led the team).

As a sophomore, he appeared in 10 games and his production dropped off, making 26 receptions (fourth on the team) for 332 yards (fourth on the team), a 12.8-yard average and 2 receiving touchdowns (tied for the team lead). He missed one game with an injury.

As a junior, he was named a starter at wide receiver, leading the team with 73 receptions for 902 yards. He also had 3 receiving touchdowns and 5 carries for 20 yards. He opened the season collecting 9 receptions for 102 yards and 2 touchdowns against Purdue University. He had a career-high 12 receptions for 134 yards against Army.

As a senior, he collected 71 receptions (led the team), 844 yards (second on the team) and 5 receiving touchdowns (led the team). He tied a career-high with 12 receptions against the University of Tulane.

Vann finished his college career with 46 game appearances, 33 starts, 207 receptions (school record), 2,625 receiving yards (school record), 14 receiving touchdowns (fourth in school history), eight 100-yard receiving games (second in school history) and a streak of 46 straight games with a reception (school record).

He also was an outfielder for the school's baseball team as a junior.

== Professional career ==
On May 16, 2003, Vann was signed by the Winnipeg Blue Bombers of the Canadian Football League. He appeared in 10 games, recording 21 catches for 324 yards, 2 receiving touchdowns, 15 punt returns for 147 yards (9.8-yard avg.) and 16 kickoff returns for 307 yards (19.2-yard avg.). On September 30, 2003, he was released.

On November 6, 2003, he signed with the Indiana Firebirds of the Arena Football League. He was placed on recallable waivers on January 30, 2004. He was signed to the Firebirds' practice squad on February 2, and was waived on March 4, 2004.

On February 3, 2005, he signed as a free agent with the Buffalo Bills. He was initially allocated to the Berlin Thunder of NFL Europe, before being cut and re-assigned to the Frankfurt Galaxy. He appeared in 2 games, tallying one catch for 12 yards and one kickoff return for 19 yards. On July 29, 2005, he was placed on the NFL Europe injured reserve list. On April 17, 2006, he was released by the Bills.

On May 10, 2007, he signed with the B.C. Lions of the Canadian Football League. He was released before the start of the season.

== Coaching career ==
In April 2025, Vann was named the head football coach at Fort Pierce Westwood Academy.
