= DeAngelo Smith =

American gridiron football player (born 1986)

Current position
- Title: Cornerbacks coach
- Team: Ohio
- Conference: MAC

Biographical details
- Born: July 17, 1986 (age 40); Columbus, Ohio, U.S.
- Education: Cincinnati

Playing career
- 2009: Dallas Cowboys*
- 2009: Cleveland Browns
- 2009: Chicago Bears
- 2009: Detroit Lions
- 2010: Cleveland Browns*
- 2012: New York Jets*
- 2013: BC Lions*
- Position: Cornerback

Coaching career (HC unless noted)
- 2014: Michigan State (Ops. Assistant)
- 2015–2016: Michigan State (GA)
- 2017–present: Ohio (CB)

Accomplishments and honors

Awards
- Second-team All-Big East (2007); Third-team All-Big East (2008)

DeAngelo Lamar Smith (born July 17, 1986) is an American former professional football player who was a safety in the National Football League (NFL) for the Detroit Lions. He played college football for the Cincinnati Bearcats and was selected by the Dallas Cowboys in the fifth round of the 2009 NFL draft.

== Early life ==
Smith attended Independence High School. As a senior, he had 11 interceptions (5 returned for touchdowns), 14 touchdown receptions and 7 kickoff or punt returns for touchdowns. He received All-State, All-City and All-District honors.

In his high school career he had 20 interceptions (7 returned for touchdowns). He also helped his team to a regional finals appearance in the state playoffs.

== College career ==
Smith accepted a football scholarship from the University of Cincinnati. As a redshirt freshman, he appeared in 7 games playing on special teams. As a sophomore, he played in 13 games as a backup cornerback, mostly on the left side behind John Bowie. He tallied 23 tackles (2 for loss), 2 fumble recoveries, 3 passes defensed and 2 interceptions (one returned for a touchdown).

He became the starter at right cornerback as a junior. His interception in the upset, against then AP Number 2 Rutgers, (now Big Ten) was featured on ESPN Sportscenter. He set the school single-season record with 8 interceptions and combined with cornerback Mike Mickens to register a total of 14 interceptions, the most by a cornerback duo in college football in 2007.

In his last year, he started the first 5 games at free safety before returning to the right cornerback position. He registered 53 tackles, 10 passes defensed and 2 interceptions. He contributed to the team winning the Big East Championship and receiving an invitation to play in the 2009 Orange Bowl against Virginia Tech.

He finished his college career tied for second in school history with 12 interceptions, after playing in 47 games with 28 starts. He also registered 126 tackles (9 for loss), 21 passes defensed, 3 forced fumbles, 353 return yards on 17 kickoffs returns (20.8-yard average) and 219 yards on 23 punt returns (9.5-yard average).

== Professional career ==
=== Dallas Cowboys ===
Smith was selected by the Dallas Cowboys in the fifth round (143rd overall) of the 2009 NFL draft. He was switched from cornerback to safety. He was waived at the end of training camp on September 5.

=== Cleveland Browns (first stint) ===
On September 6, 2009, the Cleveland Browns claimed him off waivers. He was released on September 16.

=== Chicago Bears ===
On September 17, 2009, he was claimed off waivers by the Chicago Bears. He was inactive in 2 games before being released on September 29 and signed to the team's practice squad.

=== Detroit Lions ===
On November 18, 2009, the Detroit Lions signed Smith off the Chicago Bears practice squad. In seven games he registered 16 tackles and a pass defensed. Smith was waived on April 27, 2010.

=== Cleveland Browns (second stint) ===
On April 28, 2010, he was claimed off waivers by the Browns. He spent one week with the team and was waived on September 15. He was re-signed to the practice squad on October 7. He was released on September 4, 2010 and later signed to the practice squad. He was cut on September 3, 2011.

=== New York Jets ===
On April 16, 2012, he was signed by the New York Jets. Smith was waived on May 22.

=== BC Lions ===
On May 28, 2013, he was signed by the BC Lions of the Canadian Football League. He was added to the practice roster on June 23. He was released by the Lions on August 27.

== Coaching career ==
Smith was a graduate assistant at Michigan State University from 2015 to 2016, working with the defensive backs. In 2017, he was hired to be the cornerbacks assistant coach at Ohio University.
