= Adrien Robinson =

American football player (born 1988)

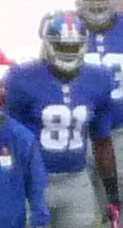
- Robinson with the New York Giants in 2012

No. 81
- Position: Tight end

Personal information
- Born: September 23, 1988 (age 38); Indianapolis, Indiana, U.S.
- Listed height: 6 ft 4 in (1.93 m)
- Listed weight: 264 lb (120 kg)

Career information
- High school: Warren Central (Indianapolis)
- College: Cincinnati (2007–2011)
- NFL draft: 2012: 4th round, 127th overall pick

Career history
- New York Giants (2012−2014); New York Jets (2016)*; Memphis Express (2019); DC Defenders (2020)*
- * Offseason or practice squad member only

Career NFL statistics
- Receptions: 5
- Receiving yards: 50
- Receiving touchdowns: 1
- Stats at Pro Football Reference

Adrien Robinson (born September 23, 1988) is an American former professional football player who was a tight end in the National Football League (NFL). He was selected in the fourth round (127th overall) in the 2012 NFL draft by the New York Giants. Born in Indianapolis, Indiana, Robinson played football at Warren Central High School, winning the state championship in all of his four seasons. He played college football for the Cincinnati Bearcats from 2008 to 2011.

== Professional career ==
=== New York Giants ===
On May 8, 2012, Robinson agreed to terms on a four-year contract worth $2.48 million with a $385,652 signing bonus.

On November 23, 2014, Robinson caught his first touchdown pass as an NFL player, a 1-yard bootleg pass by Eli Manning, against the Dallas Cowboys.

On September 5, 2015, he was waived by the Giants.

=== New York Jets ===
Robinson signed a reserve/future contract with the New York Jets on January 11, 2016.

On May 9, 2016, Robinson was released.

=== Memphis Express ===
In 2019, Robinson joined the Memphis Express of the Alliance of American Football. The league ceased operations in April 2019.

=== DC Defenders ===
Robinson was selected in the 10th round in the 2020 XFL draft by the DC Defenders. He was waived during final roster cuts on January 22, 2020.

== Personal life ==
=== Arrest ===
On July 31, 2017, Pennsylvania State Police stopped Robinson along Interstate 80 and found him in possession of “numerous large bags of marijuana." which measured at 25 pounds.

He was charged with manufacture, delivery or possession with intent to manufacture or deliver a controlled substance, and possession of drug paraphernalia.
