= George Winn (American football) =

American football player (born 1990)

No. 38
- Position: Running back

Personal information
- Born: November 10, 1990 (age 36); Southfield, Michigan, U.S.
- Listed height: 5 ft 11 in (1.80 m)
- Listed weight: 218 lb (99 kg)

Career information
- High school: University of Detroit Jesuit (Detroit Michigan)
- College: Cincinnati
- NFL draft: 2013: undrafted

Career history
- Houston Texans (2013)*; New England Patriots (2013)*; Oakland Raiders (2013)*; Pittsburgh Steelers (2013)*; Dallas Cowboys (2013)*; Detroit Lions (2014–2016); New York Giants (2016); Indianapolis Colts (2017)
- * Offseason or practice squad member only

Awards and highlights
- Second-team All-Big East (2012)

Career NFL statistics
- Rushing attempts: 23
- Rushing yards: 74
- Rushing average: 3.2
- Stats at Pro Football Reference

George Winn (born November 10, 1990) is an American former professional football player who was a running back in the National Football League (NFL). He played college football for the Cincinnati Bearcats. He originally signed with the Houston Texans as an undrafted free agent in 2013. He was also a member of the New England Patriots, Oakland Raiders, Pittsburgh Steelers, Dallas Cowboys, Detroit Lions, New York Giants and Indianapolis Colts.

== Professional career ==
=== Houston Texans ===
On April 28, 2013, Winn signed with the Houston Texans as an undrafted free agent.

=== New England Patriots ===
On June 17, 2013, he signed with the New England Patriots.

=== Oakland Raiders ===
On October 2, 2013, he signed with the Oakland Raiders as a member of the practice squad. The Raiders released Winn from the practice squad on October 15, 2013.

=== Pittsburgh Steelers ===
The Steelers signed Winn to their practice squad on October 22, 2013. He was released on November 19, 2013, and replaced by rookie Ray Graham, another undrafted free agent initially signed by the Houston Texans.

=== Dallas Cowboys ===
On December 4, 2013, Winn signed with the Dallas Cowboys practice squad. The Cowboys waived Winn on December 17, 2013.

=== Detroit Lions ===
During the 2014 offseason, Winn tried out for the Atlanta Falcons, but was not signed. Afterwards, the Detroit Lions signed him on July 16, 2014. He played twelve games for the Lions in 2014, gaining 73 yards on 19 carries. He was placed on the Lions' practice squad at the start of the 2015 season, but moved to the main club on October 19 after an injury to Zach Zenner.

On September 3, 2016, Winn was waived by the Lions and was signed to the practice squad the next day. On September 9, 2016, he was released from the Lions practice squad, but was re-signed on September 21, 2016. He released was on October 3, 2016.

=== New York Giants ===
On October 31, 2016, Winn was signed to the New York Giants' practice squad, but was released on December 14, 2016. He was re-signed to their active roster on December 20, 2016. He was waived by the Giants on May 1, 2017.

=== Indianapolis Colts ===
On August 9, 2017, Winn signed with the Indianapolis Colts. He was placed on injured reserve on August 29, 2017. He was waived by the Colts on April 24, 2018.

== Personal life ==
Winn is the cousin of former NFL wide receiver Derrick Mason . His first cousin, L. Webber, is the sister-in-law of former NBA player Chris Webber.
