= Angelo Craig =

American gridiron football player (born 1985)

Profile
- Position: Defensive end

Personal information
- Born: September 5, 1985 (age 41); Cleveland, Ohio, U.S.
- Listed height: 6 ft 5 in (1.96 m)
- Listed weight: 245 lb (111 kg)

Career information
- High school: Glenville (Cleveland, Ohio)
- College: Cincinnati (2003–2007)
- NFL draft: 2008: 7th round, 244th overall pick

Career history
- Cincinnati Bengals (2008)*; Carolina Panthers (2008)*; New England Patriots (2008–2009)*; BC Lions (2010); Hamilton Tiger-Cats (2011)
- * Offseason or practice squad member only

Awards and highlights
- 2008 Hula Bowl MVP
- Stats at CFL.ca (archive)

Angelo Craig (born September 5, 1985) is an American former football defensive end. He was selected by the Cincinnati Bengals in the seventh round of the 2008 NFL draft. He played college football at Cincinnati.

Craig was also a member of the Carolina Panthers, New England Patriots, BC Lions and Hamilton Tiger-Cats.

== Professional career ==
=== Cincinnati Bengals ===
Craig was selected by the Bengals with the 244th overall selection in the seventh round of the 2008 NFL draft. He was waived on August 30, 2008.

=== Carolina Panthers ===
Craig was signed to the Carolina Panthers' practice squad on September 1, 2008, but was waived from it on September 4, 2008.

=== New England Patriots ===
Craig was signed to the New England Patriots' practice squad on December 3, 2008. He was released on June 4, 2009.

=== Hamilton Tiger-Cats ===
On October 18, 2011, Craig signed with the Hamilton Tiger-Cats. He was released on May 9, 2012.
