= Tony Pike =

American football player (born 1986)

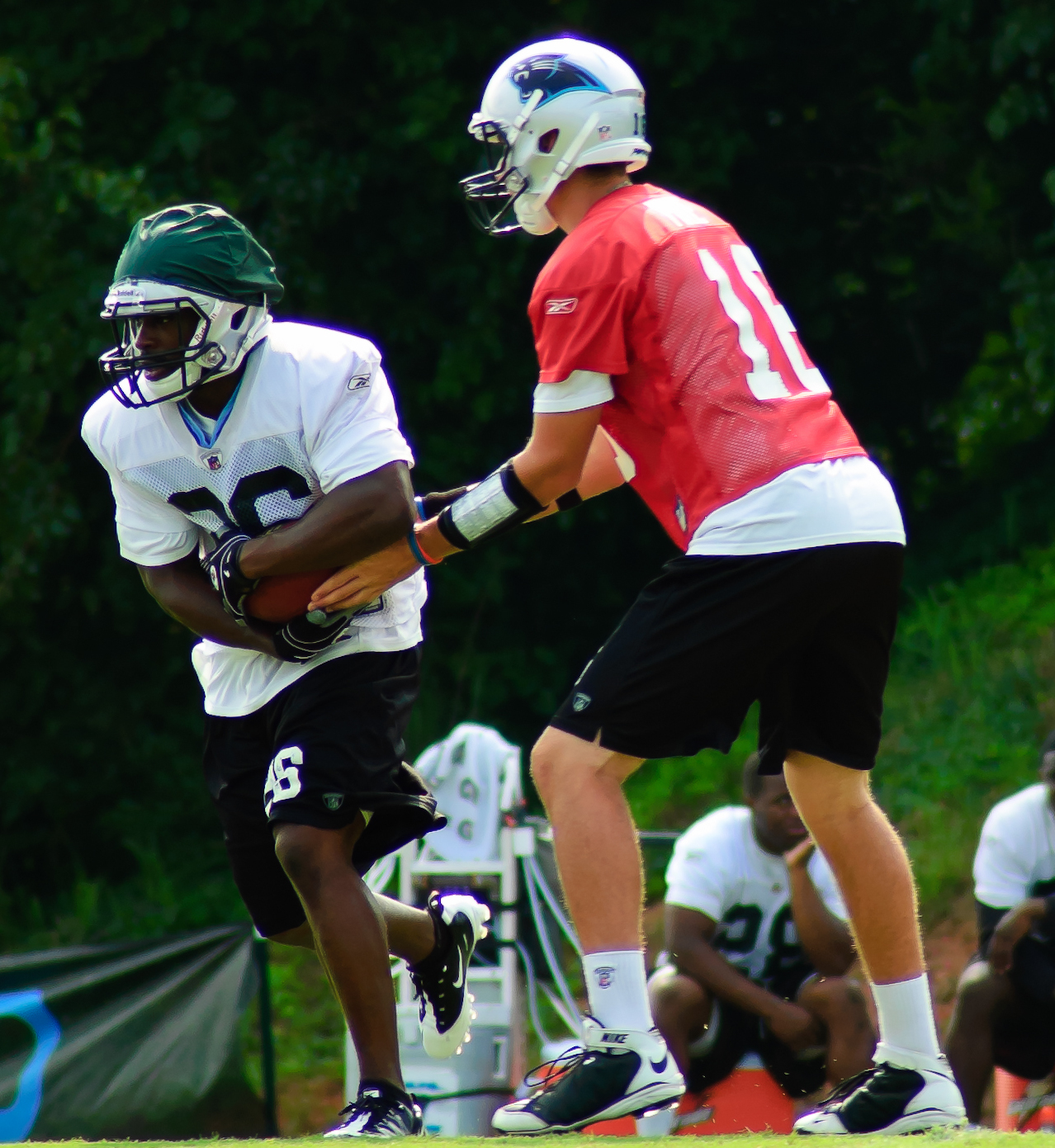
- Pike (right) with the Carolina Panthers in 2010

No. 16
- Position: Quarterback

Personal information
- Born: March 10, 1986 (age 40); Cincinnati, Ohio, U.S.
- Listed height: 6 ft 6 in (1.98 m)
- Listed weight: 222 lb (101 kg)

Career information
- High school: Reading (OH)
- College: Cincinnati
- NFL draft: 2010: 6th round, 204th overall pick

Career history
- Carolina Panthers (2010)

Awards and highlights
- First-team All-Big East (2009); Second-team All-Big East (2008)

Career NFL statistics
- TD–INT: 0–0
- Passing yards: 47
- Passer rating: 60.1
- Stats at Pro Football Reference

Anthony Steven Pike (born March 10, 1986) is an American former professional football player who was a quarterback for the Carolina Panthers of the National Football League (NFL). He played college football for the Cincinnati Bearcats and was selected by the Panthers in the sixth round of the 2010 NFL draft.

== Early life ==
Born to Steve and Cheri Pike, Tony attended Reading High School, where he was named Cincinnati Division II-III Player of the Year as a senior at football. As a senior, he completed 319 of 531 passes for 4,355 yards and 46 touchdowns, earning first-team all-state honors. Pike also played basketball, helping the Blue Devils win a state title as a junior and reach the regional finals as a senior.

== College career ==
Pike enrolled at University of Cincinnati in January 2005. He was redshirted for the 2005 season.

In 2007, he made his collegiate debut against Southeast Missouri State, Pike finished the night 6-of-9 for 57 yards and a touchdown. In 2008 college football season, Dustin Grutza was the named the team's starting quarterback following Ben Mauk's failure to gain a sixth year of eligibility from the NCAA. In a 52–26 loss to Oklahoma Sooners, a team that would play for the national championship that season, Grutza broke his ankle and was replaced by Pike.

The Bearcats traveled to Akron, Ohio to play the Akron Zips. Against the Zips, Pike broke his arm and was replaced by redshirt freshman Zach Collaros, who led the Bearcats to a 17–15 victory.

After returning as starting quarterback, Cincinnati recovered to beat two top-25 opponents, No. 23 South Florida Bulls and No. 20 West Virginia Mountaineers. Pike led the team to the outright 2008 Big East Championship, and the Bearcats played in their first-ever BCS bowl game, the 2009 Orange Bowl.

He finished the regular season 183–291 passing for 2,168 yards and 18 touchdowns. He completed 63 percent of his passes and finished second in the Big East passing efficiency list with 141.07. Pike was named to the 2008 All-Mayday Team by ESPN college football analyst Mark May. He also was named to the Second-Team All-Big East Team.

Pike enjoyed even more success in 2009. Despite missing three games due to a re-injury of his broken non-throwing arm (when he was again replaced by Collaros), Pike threw for 2,520 yards and 29 touchdowns, including a school-record six touchdowns in a single game against Illinois. Pike threw just six interceptions in 2009, and led the 2009 Bearcats to a 12–0 regular season and second straight outright Big East title. The team finished the regular season at No. 3 in the BCS rankings, and was invited to the 2010 Sugar Bowl.

Pike was inducted into the University of Cincinnati's James P. Kelly Hall of Fame on October 24, 2025.

=== Statistics ===
Year	Team	Games			Passing								Rushing			
Year	Team	GP	GS	Record	Cmp	Att	Pct	Yds	Avg	TD	Int	Rtg	Att	Yds	Avg	TD
2007	Cincinnati	5	0	0−0	11	20	55.0	91	4.6	1	3	79.7	7	75	10.7	0
2008	Cincinnati	12	10	8−2	199	324	61.4	2,407	7.4	19	11	136.4	56	47	0.8	1
2009	Cincinnati	10	9	8−1	211	338	62.4	2,520	7.5	29	6	149.8	31	6	0.2	2
Career		27	19	16−3	421	682	61.7	5,018	7.4	49	20	141.4	94	128	1.4	3

== Professional career ==
Pre-draft measurables
Height	Weight	Arm length	Hand span	40-yard dash	10-yard split	20-yard split	20-yard shuttle	Three-cone drill	Vertical jump	Broad jump
6 ft 5 3/4 in (1.97 m)	223 lb (101 kg)	34 1/2 in (0.88 m)	10 in (0.25 m)	4.90 s	1.69 s	2.86 s	4.53 s	7.06 s	28.5 in (0.72 m)	9 ft 0 in (2.74 m)
All values from NFL Combine

Pike was selected by the Carolina Panthers in the sixth round (204th overall) of the 2010 NFL draft. He competed with fellow rookie Jimmy Clausen for playing time behind incumbent Matt Moore in 2010.

In week 9 of his rookie season against the New Orleans Saints, Pike made his NFL debut after Clausen (who had replaced an injured Moore earlier in the game) was benched. He was 6–12 for 47 yards and was sacked once. The Panthers lost 34–3 and fell to 1–7. Pike was waived/injured on August 30, 2011, and was given an injury settlement.

Pike had two elbow surgeries, the second in March 2012. In the spring of 2012, he participated in tryouts for the Cincinnati Bengals. He was not signed and offensive coordinator Jay Gruden commented that "He doesn't have enough confidence in his elbow to zip the ball and let it loose."

=== Statistics ===
Year	Team	GP	GS	Passing								Rushing			
Year	Team	GP	GS	Cmp	Att	Pct	Yds	Y/A	TD	Int	Rtg	Att	Yds	Avg	TD
2010	CAR	1	0	6	12	50.0	47	3.9	0	0	60.1	0	0	0.0	0

== Personal life ==
At the end of his football career, Pike made a move to become a sports broadcaster in Cincinnati. He hosts a regular sports talk show noon-3 p.m. on ESPN 1530 and contributes to Cincinnati Bearcats football broadcasts.
