= Antwan Peek =

American football player (born 1979)

No. 98, 56
- Position: Linebacker

Personal information
- Born: October 29, 1979 (age 47); Cincinnati, Ohio, U.S.
- Listed height: 6 ft 3 in (1.91 m)
- Listed weight: 255 lb (116 kg)

Career information
- High school: Woodward (Cincinnati)
- College: Cincinnati
- NFL draft: 2003: 3rd round, 67th overall pick

Career history
- Houston Texans (2003–2006); Cleveland Browns (2007–2008)

Career NFL statistics
- Total tackles: 129
- Sacks: 14
- Forced fumbles: 6
- Fumble recoveries: 4
- Interceptions: 1
- Defensive touchdowns: 1
- Stats at Pro Football Reference

Antwan Peek (born October 29, 1979) is an American former professional football player who was a linebacker in the National Football League (NFL). He was selected by the Houston Texans in the third round of the 2003 NFL draft. He played college football for the Cincinnati Bearcats.

Peek also played for the Cleveland Browns.

== Early life ==
Peek is a 1998 graduate of Woodward High School in Cincinnati, Ohio, and was a letterwinner in football, basketball, and track & field. In football and basketball, he was named the Team's Most Valuable Player as a senior.

== College career ==
Peek played college football at the University of Cincinnati. He set a school record with 27.5 sacks and finished his career with 200 tackles. He majored in criminal justice.

== Professional career ==
Pre-draft measurables
Height	Weight	Arm length	Hand span	40-yard dash	10-yard split	20-yard split	20-yard shuttle	Three-cone drill	Vertical jump	Broad jump	Bench press
6 ft 3 in (1.91 m)	246 lb (112 kg)	32 in (0.81 m)	9 3/8 in (0.24 m)	4.67 s	1.54 s	2.69 s	4.35 s	7.07 s	37 in (0.94 m)	10 ft 5 in (3.18 m)	21 reps
All values from NFL Combine.

=== Houston Texans ===
Peek was selected by the Houston Texans in the third round (67th overall) in the 2003 NFL draft. In his rookie season, he played in ten games and made 28 tackles. He made his NFL debut at the Miami Dolphins on September 7. In his second season with the Texans, he played in 14 games and finished the season with 12 tackles and two sacks. In the game against the Jacksonville Jaguars on December 26, he returned a fumble 66 yards for his first NFL career touchdown. In 2005, Peek started in every game for the first time in his career. He finished the season with 57 tackles and his career-high six sacks was the second highest on the team. The start of the 2006 season was frustrating for Peek as he missed the first five games with an injury. However, he appeared in the final 11 games and finished the season with 13 tackles.

=== Cleveland Browns ===
Peek was signed by the Cleveland Browns as an unrestricted free agent on March 3, 2007. He made his Browns debut versus the Pittsburgh Steelers on September 9. He made 14 appearances with five starts and finished the season with 24 tackles.

On February 9, 2009, Peek was released by the Browns.

== NFL career statistics ==
Legend
**Bold**	Career high

Year	Team	Games		Tackles					Interceptions					Fumbles			
Year	Team	GP	GS	Cmb	Solo	Ast	Sck	TFL	Int	Yds	TD	Lng	PD	FF	FR	Yds	TD
2003	HOU	10	4	25	20	5	1.0	0	0	0	0	0	2	0	0	0	0
2004	HOU	14	1	20	15	5	2.0	2	**1**	**20**	0	**20**	1	1	1	**66**	**1**
2005	HOU	**16**	**16**	**47**	**30**	**17**	**6.0**	**5**	0	0	0	0	2	**2**	**2**	0	0
2006	HOU	11	2	18	14	4	1.0	1	0	0	0	0	1	**2**	0	0	0
2007	CLE	14	5	19	12	7	4.0	3	0	0	0	0	**4**	1	1	0	0
		65	28	129	91	38	14.0	11	1	20	0	20	10	6	4	66	1
