= Larry Coker =

American football player and coach (born 1948)

Biographical details
- Born: June 23, 1948 (age 78); Okemah, Oklahoma, U.S.

Playing career
- 1966–1969: Northeastern State
- Position: Defensive back

Coaching career (HC unless noted)
- 1971–1976: Fairfax HS (OK)
- 1977–1978: Claremore HS (OK)
- 1979: Tulsa (RB/QB)
- 1980–1982: Tulsa (OC)
- 1983–1989: Oklahoma State (OC)
- 1990–1992: Oklahoma (OC)
- 1993–1994: Ohio State (DB)
- 1995–2000: Miami (FL) (OC/QB)
- 2001–2006: Miami (FL)
- 2009–2015: UTSA

Head coaching record
- Overall: 86–47 (college)
- Bowls: 4–2

Accomplishments and honors

Championships
- National (2001); Big East (2001–2003)

Awards
- AFCA Coach of the Year (2001); Paul "Bear" Bryant Award (2001); 2× Big East Coach of the Year (2001–2002); UTSA Sports Hall of Fame (2023)

Larry Edward Coker (born June 23, 1948) is an American former college football coach and player. He served as the head football coach of the University of Miami from 2001 to 2006 and the University of Texas at San Antonio (UTSA) from 2011 to 2016.

Coker's 2001 Miami team was named the consensus national champion after an undefeated season that culminated with a victory in the Rose Bowl over Nebraska. In the process of winning the championship, Coker became the third head coach since 1948 to win the national championship in his first season. (Bennie Oosterbaan from the University of Michigan and Dennis Erickson of the University of Miami were the last two head coaches to accomplish this feat.) Coker was fired by Miami on November 24, 2006, following his sixth loss that season.

After a stint as a television analyst for ESPNU, he became head coach for the University of Texas at San Antonio, whose Roadrunners football team began play in 2011. He resigned as UTSA coach on January 5, 2016.

== Coaching career ==
=== Early career ===
In 1971 Coker became the head coach of the Fairfax Red Devils and won two Oklahoma State football titles in a just a few years. He also coached several award-winning players, including Joe Tillman, George Pease III, Craig Lance, and Oklahoma Football player of the year Arthur Crosby.

Coker has served as an assistant at several universities, including Ohio State University, the University of Oklahoma, and Oklahoma State University. He was Miami's offensive coordinator from 1995 to 2000 before taking over as head coach following the departure of Butch Davis to the Cleveland Browns of the NFL.

Coker had several successful seasons as offensive coordinator over nearly a decade from 1983 to 1993. He is most known for coaching RBs Thurman Thomas and Barry Sanders at Oklahoma State, and Jeremy Shockey, Andre Johnson, Bryant McKinnie, and Edgerrin James at Miami. All went on to become Pro-Bowlers in the NFL.

=== Miami ===
==== 2001–2003 ====
After Butch Davis was hired by the NFL's Cleveland Browns, Coker, previously the offensive coordinator, was promoted to head coach. Options for a new head coach were limited because Davis announced his decision to leave when it was nearly February and the Miami administration's first two choices for the coaching position, Dave Wannstedt and Barry Alvarez, turned the job down. In addition, many Hurricane players, especially Ed Reed, were lobbying for Coker's promotion. They believed that not changing the team's system would be the key to winning the title that had evaded them in 2000. The Hurricanes had been edged out of the BCS Championship Game the year before despite being ranked No. 2 in both the final AP Poll and the Coaches' Poll and having defeated BCS No. 2 Florida State.

Coker had immediate success as head coach, guiding the Hurricanes to a 12–0 record and the national championship in his first season after dominating a Frank Solich-led Nebraska Cornhuskers team in the Rose Bowl. For his efforts, Coker was given numerous honors, including the Paul "Bear" Bryant Award and the AFCA Coach of the Year.

The Hurricanes won their first 12 games in 2002, extending a winning streak that dated back to the 2000 season to 34 games and giving Coker an unblemished 24–0 record heading into the 2003 Fiesta Bowl, which served as the BCS National Championship Game. Even at the time, some people doubted how much credit Coker deserved for his start, believing that other coaches might have been able to accomplish the same thing with the talent he inherited.

The 11½-point underdog Ohio State Buckeyes stunningly lead the Hurricanes 17–7 heading into the 4th quarter. After Miami cut the lead to 17–14, star Miami tailback Willis McGahee suffered a leg injury that saw him leave the game in what turned out to be his final college game.

Late in the quarter, with the Hurricanes still down 17–14, Ohio State faced a 3rd and 8 deep on their own side of the field. Buckeyes receiver Chris Gamble caught a pass that would have gotten the Buckeyes a key first down, but officials ruled he was out of bounds. Many people felt Gamble had made the catch in bounds, especially after seeing the replay. The Buckeyes were forced to punt, and the Hurricanes returned the punt all the way to the Buckeyes' 25-yard line. The Ohio State defense shut down the Miami offense, forcing the Canes to kick a FG that brought the game into overtime.

After the Hurricanes scored a touchdown in the first possession of overtime to take a 24–17 lead, Ohio State faced a 4th and 3 on the Miami 6-yard line that they needed to convert to keep the game alive. Ohio State's quarterback Craig Krenzel again threw a pass to Chris Gamble. This pass fell to the ground, and Coker and the Miami coaching staff went on to the field, celebrating what they believed was their 2nd straight national championship. Instead, after about a 4-second delay, official Terry Porter took out a flag and called Miami defender Glenn Sharpe for pass interference. As it turned out, Ohio State tied the game, and then won in the 2nd OT, 31–24.

The pass interference call remains controversial to this day. Miami fans argue that the flag should not have been called, especially at the end of a national title game and especially after a 4-second delay. Ohio State fans argue that the pass interference call was legitimate, and further argue that the Buckeyes would have won in regulation if Gamble had been called in bounds on his previous catch. Years later, Coker would admit he was still bitter about the call and wondered if he would have gotten fired if he had 2 national titles rather than 1.

In 2003, things took a different turn when a pair of late-season losses kept Miami out of the BCS National Championship Game for the first time during Coker's tenure, already showing some signs of decay as the Coker tenure went on. Nevertheless, the Hurricanes won the Big East Conference and defeated their arch-rivals, the Florida State Seminoles, for the second time that season in the Orange Bowl. Miami finished the campaign with an 11–2 record and a No. 5 ranking in both major polls. The Hurricanes also had beaten both Florida and Florida State in the regular season, giving them a 3–0 record against in-state rivals for the year.

==== 2004–2006 ====
Miami joined the Atlantic Coast Conference (ACC) in 2004 and the team finished with a somewhat disappointing 9–3 record and No. 11 ranking in the final polls. The Hurricanes lost in their regular season finale to Virginia Tech in the de facto ACC championship game. The Hurricanes ended the season on a happy note by defeating instate rival Florida Gators, 27–10, in the Peach Bowl in Atlanta.

In late September 2005, Coker agreed to a five-year contract extension with the university. The new contract would have paid Coker in the neighborhood of $2 million per season, making him one of the highest-paid coaches in college football. In the season opener, Coker lost to FSU for the first time when the Hurricanes blew a snap of a potential game-tying field goal. This was in contrast to previous games in the series where Miami had previously won after last-second missed FSU field goals. The Hurricanes defeated Clemson in OT in their 2nd game, barely avoiding their first 0–2 start in over 25 years. Things got much better in the next seven games, all of which the Hurricanes won by at least 18 points. The highlight was a 27–7 win on the road against undefeated No. 3 Virginia Tech. The Hurricanes entered a late November contest against Georgia Tech with an 8–1 record and #3 national ranking. At this point Coker's tenure took a permanent turn downward. The 18-point underdog Yellow Jackets beat the Hurricanes 14–10. After beating Virginia by 8 points in the next game, the Hurricanes finished the regular season 9–2 and were invited to the Peach Bowl. The Hurricanes lost 40–3 to LSU. This was the worst bowl defeat in school history, and included a post-game fight in the tunnel leaving the stadium. In the wake of this loss, Coker fired four longtime Miami assistants. The team finished with a 9–3 record for the second consecutive season.

Coker was reported to be on the hot seat entering the 2006 season, with many speculating that he would need to at least take the team to a BCS bowl in order to keep his job. Although many outsiders thought it was ridiculous that Coker was on the hot seat despite a 53–9 record, many Miami fans believed Coker had brought the program on the downswing after winning for his first 2 or 3 years with the recruits of predecessor Butch Davis.

Miami began the 2006 season with a 1–2 record, with losses to Florida State and a 31–7 defeat to Louisville, leaving the team unranked in the AP Poll for the first time since 1999. The Louisville loss led to rumors that Coker's firing was imminent, but Miami Director of Athletics Paul Dee gave Coker a vote of confidence, stating that he would coach at least through the end of the season.

After the team's October 14 win against FIU was marred by a bench-clearing brawl, questions were raised in the media as to whether Coker would resign or be fired, but he was again given a vote of confidence by the school administration. The next week, with 13 players suspended by the ACC, Miami defeated winless Duke only 20–15. All but one of the players returned the next week, as Miami jumped out to a 10–0 lead over Georgia Tech, but struggled in the fourth quarter, losing the game by a score of 30–23. This left the team at 5–3, further encouraging speculation that Coker would be dismissed by season's end.

The following week, the Hurricanes lost to Virginia Tech, 17–10, as ESPN College Football analysts questioned Coker's management of the clock in the game's final minutes. This was the first time Miami had been an underdog at home in Coker's six seasons as coach. The team fell to 5–4 and 2–3 in the ACC, suffering its first four-loss season since 1999.

==== Firing ====
Miami defeated a ranked Boston College team on Thanksgiving to finish the regular season with a 6–6 record. Revealing an apparent lack of communication between Coker and University of Miami President Donna Shalala, Coker predicted after the victory that he would be back as head coach in 2007. The following day, however, he was fired.

On December 8, 2006, the University of Miami announced Randy Shannon would succeed Coker as head coach. Shannon previously served under Coker as Miami's defensive coordinator from 2001 to 2006. Coker was allowed to coach the team in the 2006 MPC Computers Bowl on December 31, 2006, in which Miami defeated the Nevada Wolf Pack, 21–20. Coker finished his time at Miami with a 60–15 record, but had declined every year and was not popular at the time of his firing. In 2018, showing that he had possibly become more popular after Miami football struggled for years after his firing, Coker was inducted into the Miami Sports Hall of Fame.

In January 2007, Coker interviewed for the head coaching position at Rice University. According to several media sources, he was one of two finalists for the position. However, Rice selected David Bailiff, formerly head coach at Texas State University.

=== UTSA ===
In February 2009, Coker applied for the first head coach position for the University of Texas at San Antonio's new football team. On March 5, it was reported that he would be the head coach for the school's inaugural season. Coker compiled a 26–32 record in five seasons as the Roadrunners' coach before resigning on January 5, 2016.

== Head coaching record ==
=== College ===
Year	Team	Overall	Conference	Standing	Bowl/playoffs	Coaches^{#}	AP^{°}
Miami Hurricanes (Big East Conference) (2001–2003)
2001	Miami	12–0	7–0	1st	W Rose^{†}	1	1
2002	Miami	12–1	7–0	1st	L Fiesta^{†}	2	2
2003	Miami	11–2	6–1	1st	W Orange^{†}	5	5
Miami Hurricanes (Atlantic Coast Conference) (2004–2006)
2004	Miami	9–3	5–3	T–3rd	W Peach	11	11
2005	Miami	9–3	6–2	2nd (Coastal)	L Peach	18	17
2006	Miami	7–6	3–5	4th (Coastal)	W MPC Computers		
Miami:		60–15	34–11				
UTSA Roadrunners (NCAA Division I FCS independent) (2011)
2011	UTSA	4–6					
UTSA Roadrunners (Western Athletic Conference) (2012)
2012	UTSA	8–4	3–3	4th			
UTSA Roadrunners (Conference USA) (2013–2015)
2013	UTSA	7–5	6–2	T–2nd (West)			
2014	UTSA	4–8	3–5	4th (West)			
2015	UTSA	3–9	3–5	T–3rd (West)			
UTSA:		26–32	15–15				
Total:		86–47					
National championship Conference title Conference division title or championship game berth
^{†}Indicates BCS bowl.; ^{#}Rankings from final Coaches Poll.; ^{°}Rankings from final AP Poll.
