= 2005 North Carolina Tar Heels football team =

American college football season

2005 North Carolina Tar Heels football
- Conference: Atlantic Coast Conference
- Coastal Division
- Record: 5–6 (4–4 ACC)
- Head coach: John Bunting (5th season)
- Offensive coordinator: Gary Tranquill (5th season)
- Offensive scheme: Pro-style
- Defensive coordinator: Marvin Sanders (2nd season)
- Base defense: 4–3
- Captains: Matt Baker; Tommy Richardson; Wallace Wright
- Home stadium: Kenan Memorial Stadium

2005 Atlantic Coast Conference football standings
	Conf.			Overall
Team	W		L	W		L
Atlantic Division
No. 23 Florida State xy$	5	–	3	8	–	5
No. 18 Boston College x	5	–	3	9	–	3
No. 21 Clemson	4	–	4	8	–	4
Wake Forest	3	–	5	4	–	7
NC State	3	–	5	7	–	5
Maryland	3	–	5	5	–	6
Coastal Division
No. 7 Virginia Tech x	7	–	1	11	–	2
No. 17 Miami (FL)	6	–	2	9	–	3
Georgia Tech	5	–	3	7	–	5
North Carolina	4	–	4	5	–	6
Virginia	3	–	5	7	–	5
Duke	0	–	8	1	–	10
Championship: Florida State 27, Virginia Tech 22
$ – BCS representative as conference champion; x – Division champion/co-champions; y – Championship game participant; Rankings from AP Poll

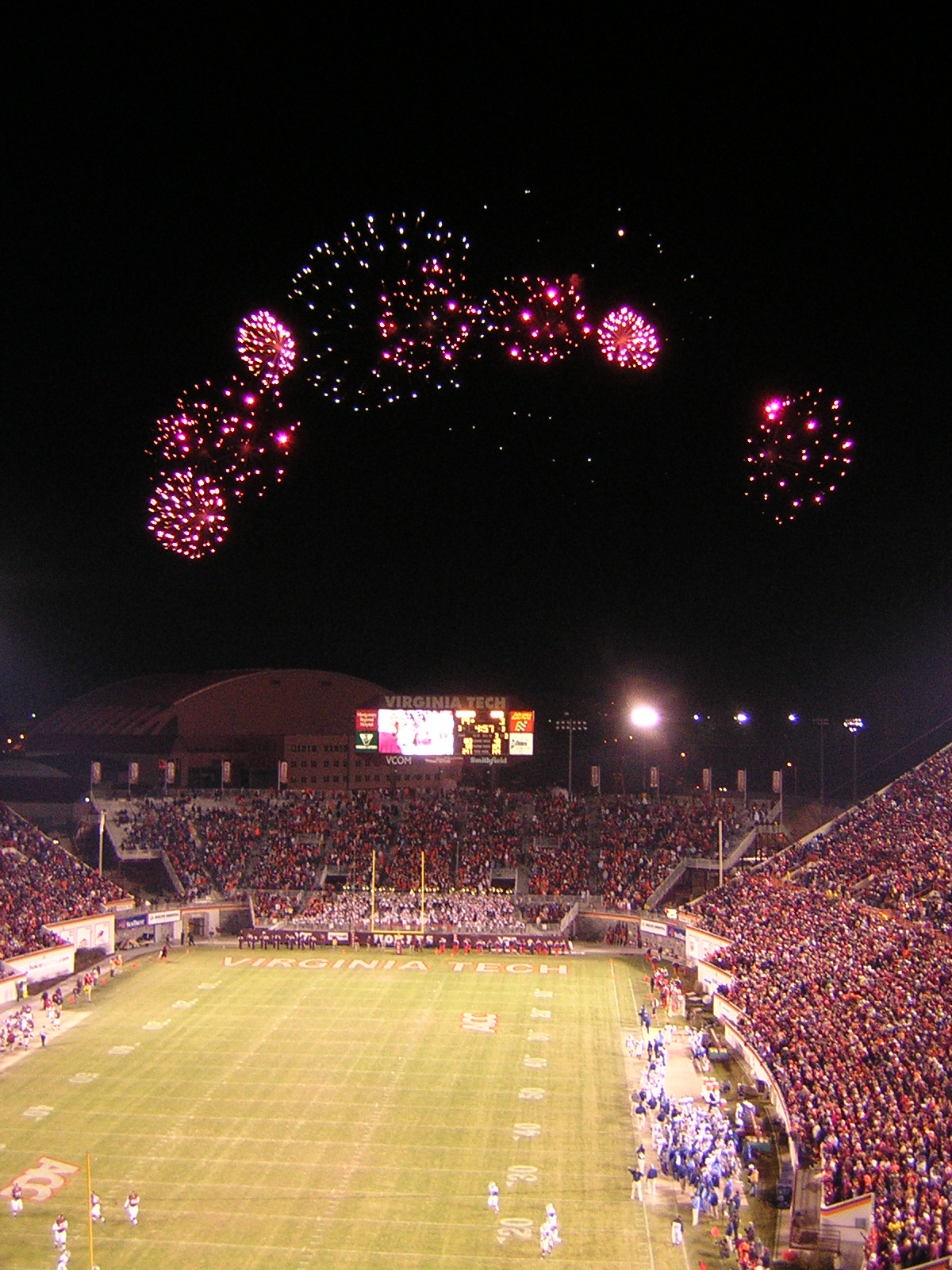
Fireworks over Virginia Tech's Lane Stadium at the 2005 game between the University of North Carolina and Virginia Tech.

The 2005 North Carolina Tar Heels football team represented the University of North Carolina at Chapel Hill as a member of Coastal Division of the Atlantic Coast Conference (ACC) during the 2005 NCAA Division I-A football season. Led by fifth-year head coach John Bunting, the Tar Heels played their home games at Kenan Memorial Stadium in Chapel Hill, North Carolina. North Carolina finished the season 5–6 overall and 4–4 in ACC play to place fourth in the Coastal Division.

== Schedule ==
Date	Time	Opponent	Site	TV	Result	Attendance
September 10	3:30 p.m.	at No. 17 Georgia Tech	Bobby Dodd Stadium; Atlanta, GA	ABC	L 21–27	46,459
September 17	7:00 p.m.	Wisconsin*	Kenan Memorial Stadium; Chapel Hill, NC	ESPN2	L 5–14	60,000
September 24	12:00 p.m.	at NC State	Carter–Finley Stadium; Raleigh, NC (rivalry)	JPS	W 31–24	57,100
October 1	1:30 p.m.	Utah*	Kenan Memorial Stadium; Chapel Hill, NC		W 31–17	50,000
October 8	4:30 p.m.	at No. 23 Louisville*	Papa John's Cardinal Stadium; Louisville, KY	ESPNGP	L 14–69	41,334
October 22	12:00 p.m.	No. 23 Virginia	Kenan Memorial Stadium; Chapel Hill, NC (South's Oldest Rivalry)	JPS	W 7–5	52,000
October 29	12:00 p.m.	at No. 6 Miami (FL)	Miami Orange Bowl; Miami, FL	ESPN2	L 16–34	30,618
November 5	12:00 p.m.	No. 19 Boston College^{†}	Kenan Memorial Stadium; Chapel Hill, NC	JPS	W 16–14	48,000
November 12	12:00 p.m.	Maryland	Kenan Memorial Stadium; Chapel Hill, NC	JPS	L 30–33 ^{OT}	56,000
November 19	1:00 p.m.	Duke	Kenan Memorial Stadium; Chapel Hill, NC (Victory Bell)		W 24–21	50,000
November 26	7:45 p.m.	at No. 5 Virginia Tech	Lane Stadium; Blacksburg, VA	ESPN	L 3–30	65,115
*Non-conference game; ^{†}Homecoming; Rankings from AP Poll released prior to the game; All times are in Eastern time

== Coaching staff ==
Name	Position	Seasons in Position
John Bunting	Head coach	5th
Dave Brock	Wide receivers	1st
Ken Browning	Defensive tackles	12th
Jeff Connors	Strength and conditioning coordinator	5th
John Gutekunst	Assistant head coach / tight ends	2nd
Hal Hunter	Offensive line	4th
Brad Lawing	Defensive ends / recruiting coordinator	3rd
Andre' Powell	Running backs / special teams coordinator	5th
Marvin Sanders	Defensive coordinator / defensive backs	2nd
Tommy Thigpen	Linebackers	1st
Gary Tranquill	Offensive coordinator / quarterbacks	5th

== Roster ==
2005 North Carolina Tar Heels football team roster
Players
Coaches
Offense

Pos.	#	Name	Class
QB	7	Matt Baker	Sr
G	57	Bryon Bishop	So
WR	88	Brooks Foster	So
WR	9	Jesse Holley	Jr
TE	89	Richard Quinn	Fr
OT	73	Garrett Reynolds	Fr
OT	55	Skip Seagraves	Sr
WR	87	Brandon Tate	Fr
WR	29	Wallace Wright	Sr

Defense

Pos.	#	Name	Class
DT	90	Kentwan Balmer	So
LB	58	Melik Brown	Jr
DE	80	Tommy Davis	Sr
LB	32	Larry Edwards	Jr
CB	13	Cedrick Holt	Sr
DE	94	Khalif Mitchell	So
DT	95	Chase Page	Sr
LB	51	Chase Rice	So
DE	33	Hilee Taylor	So
DT	93	Cam Thomas	Fr
CB	16	Jacoby Watkins	Jr
DE	85	E. J. Wilson	Fr
LB	54	Victor Worsley	Jr

Special teams

Pos.	#	Name	Class
K	10	Connor Barth	So

Head coach

- John Bunting

Coordinators/assistant coaches

Legend

- (C) Team captain
- (S) Suspended
- (I) Ineligible
- Injured
- Redshirt

== Team statistics ==
Passing Leader	Cmp	Att	Yds	TD	Int
Matt Baker	180	346	2345	9	11

Rushing Leaders	Car	Yds	Long	TD
Ronnie McGill	130	530	37	5
Barrington Edwards	114	397	62	2
James "Cooter" Arnold	48	187	15	0

Receiving Leaders	Rec	Yds	Long	TD
Jesse Holley	47	670	49	1
Mike Mason	22	372	44	1
Jarwarski Pollock	30	341	33	2

Kicking	XPM	XPA	FGM	FGM	Long	Pts
Connor Barth	23	23	11	21	45	56
