= List of Atlantic Coast Conference football champions =

The Atlantic Coast Conference football champions includes 11 distinct teams that have won the college football championship awarded by the Atlantic Coast Conference (ACC) since its creation in 1953. Sixteen teams have competed in the conference since that year. Four teams—Miami, Boston College, Syracuse, and Louisville—have never won an ACC football championship, while two schools that are no longer a member of the league hold championships: Maryland holds nine championships and South Carolina holds one championship.

Between 1953 and 2003, the championship was normally earned in round-robin regular-season play among all conference members, although in earlier years league teams did not typically play every possible ACC opponent. The league did not employ tiebreaking procedures, such as head-to-head results, to determine a single champion, and thus it was not unusual for a season to end with "co-champions." With a 2004 expansion of the league to include Miami and Virginia Tech, round-robin play became impossible due to an NCAA limit on the number of games a team may play during the season and the unwillingness of the league to hold more than eight conference games per season per team. NCAA rules also forbade a championship game due to the league having only 11 members.

A 2005 expansion that admitted Boston College gave the ACC the required 12 members needed for divisional play and a championship game. The ACC Championship Game has been held annually since that year, featuring the regular-season winners of the Atlantic and Coastal divisions in a game to determine the conference champion.

During the 2005, 2006, and 2007 seasons, the championship game was held at Alltel Stadium in Jacksonville, Florida. In 2008 and 2009, the championship was held at Raymond James Stadium in Tampa, Florida. From 2010 through 2015 the game was held at Bank of America Stadium in Charlotte, North Carolina. It returned to Florida in 2016 when it was held at Camping World Stadium in Orlando, but moved back to Charlotte in 2017 where the championship game is slated to remain through 2030.

== Early era ==
The charter members of the ACC were Clemson, Duke, Maryland, North Carolina, North Carolina State, South Carolina, and Wake Forest. The seven ACC charter members had been aligned with the Southern Conference, but left due in part to the conference's ban on postseason play. The ACC officially came into existence on June 14, 1953. The 1953 NCAA University Division football season, the first under the new conference, saw Duke and Maryland crowned conference co-champions. Maryland later went on to be crowned national champions before losing the 1954 Orange Bowl.

On December 4, 1953, conference officials convened in Greensboro, North Carolina, and admitted the University of Virginia as the eighth member of the conference. Virginia was the first non-Southern Conference member to join the new conference, as Virginia had played football with no conference affiliation since 1936. The conference operated with eight members until June 30, 1971, when the University of South Carolina left to become an independent.

After South Carolina's departure, the ACC operated with seven members until April 3, 1978, when the Georgia Institute of Technology was admitted. The Atlanta school had withdrawn from the Southeastern Conference in January 1964 and had operated as an independent before joining the ACC. Though the school joined the conference beginning with the 1979 season, it did not become eligible to win the ACC football championship until the 1983 season. Seven years after beginning full ACC play, Georgia Tech won its first ACC football championship en route to winning the 1990 NCAA Division I football championship.

In the fall of 1982, Clemson University was put on probation by the NCAA for recruiting violations. The probation forbade the team from participating in any bowl games, reduced the scholarships available to the team, and rendered the team ineligible for ACC football championship competition. Though the team still played its full slate of games during the 1983 season and finished 9–1–1, Maryland, which finished with an 8–4 record, was awarded the ACC football championship.

The ACC expanded to nine members on September 15, 1990, with the addition of Florida State. Beginning with the 1992 football season—its first in the ACC—Florida State won or shared the ACC football championship nine consecutive times. The conference expanded to 11 members on July 1, 2004, with the addition of the University of Miami and Virginia Polytechnic Institute and State University.

Miami and Virginia Tech began official ACC play with the 2004 season, but because the league was forbidden from hosting a championship game, the conference was forced to award a championship based on regular-season play (round-robin scheduling was no longer used beginning that season). Virginia Tech, which had the best conference record at the conclusion of the season, was awarded the ACC championship.

== Championship game era ==
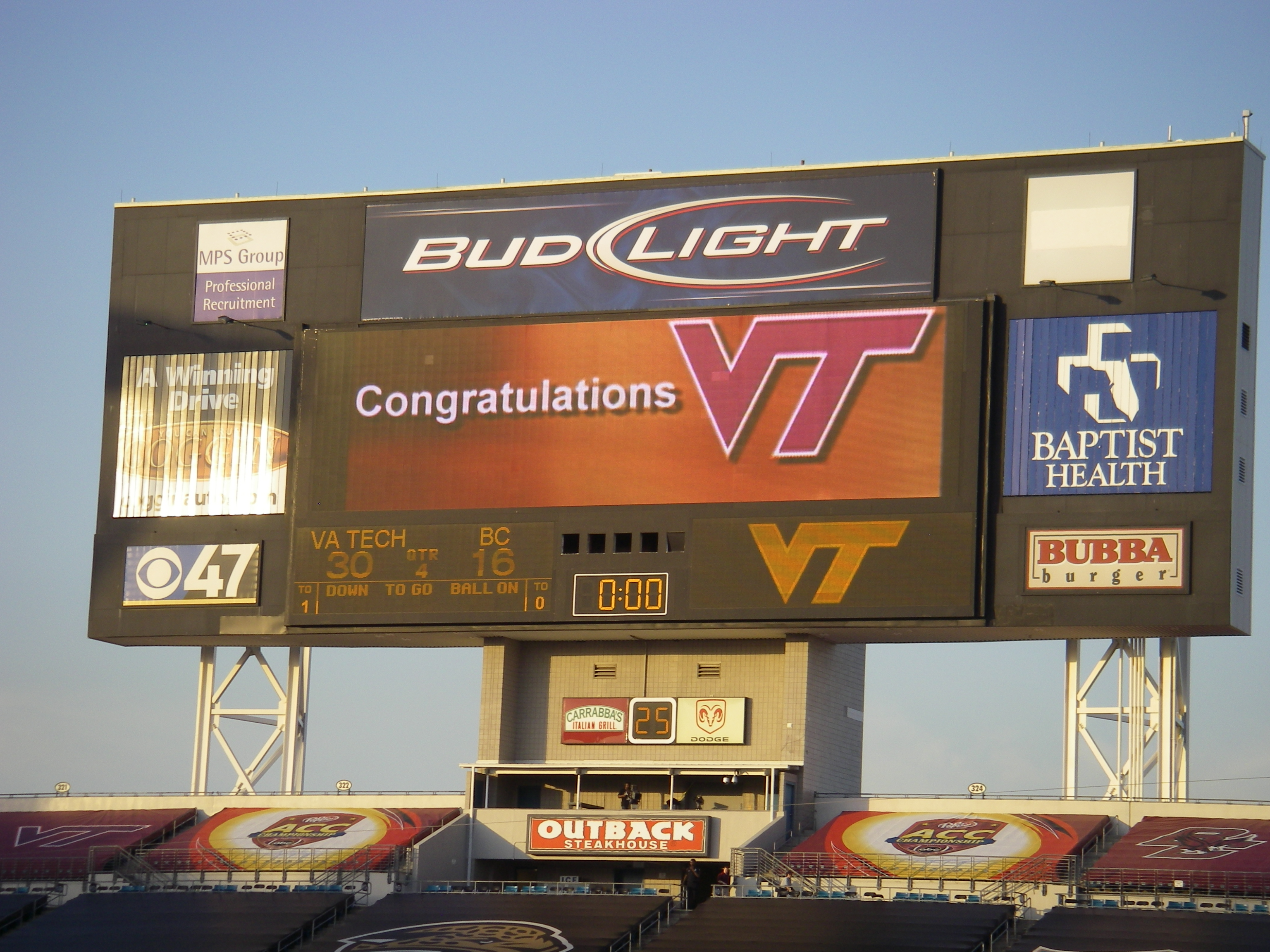
The final scoreboard of the 2007 ACC Championship Game records the 30–16 score and congratulates Virginia Tech on its victory.

Following the admittance of Boston College into the conference beginning with the 2005–2006 season, the conference began to play an annual championship game to conclude the season. The new 12-team conference was divided into two divisions, and the champion of each division (the team with the best conference record in each division) was awarded an invitation to the conference championship game.

The first championship game was held in Jacksonville, Florida, on December 3, 2005, with Florida State (champions of the Atlantic Division) defeating Virginia Tech (Coastal Division champions), 27–22. In 2006, Wake Forest faced off against Georgia Tech for the championship. In the lowest-scoring conference championship game in Division I history, Wake defeated Georgia Tech, 9–6. The 2007 game saw Virginia Tech return to the contest, this time facing off against Boston College. In their second ACC Championship Game, Tech defeated Boston College, 30–16.

The 2008 ACC Championship Game was held in Raymond James Stadium in Tampa, Florida, on December 6, 2008. Virginia Tech won by a score of 30–12, becoming the first ACC team to win consecutive ACC championship games. Tampa also hosted the 2009 ACC Championship Game which was won by Georgia Tech over Clemson. Poor attendance in both of the Florida locations caused a move to Charlotte, North Carolina's Bank of America Stadium where the game has been held yearly since 2010 with the exception of 2016 when it was held at Camping World Stadium in Orlando. The game is to remain in Charlotte through 2030.

== Champions by year ==
Year	Champion	Notes
1953	Duke	This was the inaugural ACC football season, and seven teams participated. Maryland also won the 1953 NCAA Division I college football national championship.
1953	Maryland	This was the inaugural ACC football season, and seven teams participated. Maryland also won the 1953 NCAA Division I college football national championship.
1954	Duke	Virginia participated as an ACC team for the first time. Eight schools participated in the ACC.
1955	Duke	
1955	Maryland	
1956	Clemson	
1957	NC State	
1958	Clemson	
1959	Clemson	
1960	Duke	
1961	Duke	
1962	Duke	
1963	North Carolina	
1963	NC State	
1964	NC State	
1965	Clemson	South Carolina/Duke originally co-champions. League office made South Carolina forfeit wins against NC State and Clemson which made them co-champions.
1965	NC State	South Carolina/Duke originally co-champions. League office made South Carolina forfeit wins against NC State and Clemson which made them co-champions.
1966	Clemson	
1967	Clemson	
1968	NC State	
1969	South Carolina	
1970	Wake Forest	
1971	North Carolina	South Carolina left the ACC following the 1971 season. Seven schools remained in the ACC.
1972	North Carolina	
1973	NC State	
1974	Maryland	
1975	Maryland	
1976	Maryland	
1977	North Carolina	
1978	Clemson	
1979	NC State	
1980	North Carolina	
1981	Clemson	Clemson also won the National Championship beating Nebraska in the Orange Bowl.
1982	Clemson	
1983	Maryland	Clemson finished unbeaten versus ACC opponents, but was ineligible for the 1983 conference title. Thus, the championship was awarded to Maryland, whose loss to Clemson did not count against its conference record. Georgia Tech became eligible to win the ACC football championship this season.
1984	Maryland	
1985	Maryland	
1986	Clemson	
1987	Clemson	
1988	Clemson	
1989	Virginia/Duke	
1990	Georgia Tech	Georgia Tech also won the UPI National Championship (now the USA Today Coaches' Poll), beating Nebraska in the Citrus Bowl.
1991	Clemson	Florida State joined the ACC, but did not compete for the football championship until the following season.
1992	Florida State	
1993	Florida State	Florida State also won the National Championship that season, beating Nebraska in the Orange Bowl
1994	Florida State	
1995	Florida State	Florida State earned the Bowl Alliance bid awarded to the 1995 ACC football champion.
1995	Virginia	Florida State earned the Bowl Alliance bid awarded to the 1995 ACC football champion.
1996	Florida State	
1997	Florida State	
1998	Florida State; Georgia Tech	Florida State earned the Bowl Championship Series bid awarded to each of the top 2 teams in the national rankings.
1999	Florida State	Florida State won its second national championship that season, beating Michael Vick and Virginia Tech in the Sugar Bowl
2000	Florida State	Florida State earned the Bowl Championship Series bid awarded to each of the top 2 teams in the national rankings.
2001	Maryland	Maryland became the first team besides Florida State to win the outright conference championship since FSU joined the ACC.
2002	Florida State	
2003	Florida State	
2004	Virginia Tech	Virginia Tech and Miami joined the ACC, which then had 11 teams.
2005	Florida State	Boston College joined the ACC, who then had 12 teams. This was the first year of the ACC Championship Game. Florida State defeated Coastal Division champion Virginia Tech.
2006	Wake Forest	Wake Forest defeated Coastal Division champion Georgia Tech.
2007	Virginia Tech	Virginia Tech defeated Atlantic Division champion Boston College.
2008	Virginia Tech	Virginia Tech defeated Atlantic Division champion Boston College.
2009	Georgia Tech‡	Georgia Tech defeated Atlantic Division champion Clemson in the championship game, but the NCAA later vacated its win.
2010	Virginia Tech	Virginia Tech defeated Atlantic Division champion Florida State.
2011	Clemson	Clemson defeated Coastal Division champion Virginia Tech.
2012	Florida State	Florida State defeated Coastal Division champion Georgia Tech.
2013	Florida State	Florida State defeated Coastal Division champion Duke, followed by a victory over Auburn in the BCS National Championship Game for the Seminoles' third title. Both Pittsburgh and Syracuse joined the ACC, bringing it to a total of 14 teams. Notre Dame also joined the ACC, competing for the championship in all sports but football, where it would play five games versus ACC opponents. This brought the conference to 15 teams. Maryland left the ACC following the 2013 season.
2014	Florida State	Louisville joined the ACC replacing Maryland who joined the Big Ten. Florida State defeated Coastal Division champion Georgia Tech. Florida State lost to Oregon in the 2014 Rose Bowl Game of the inaugural College Football Playoff.
2015	Clemson	Clemson defeated Coastal Division champion North Carolina. Clemson defeated Oklahoma in the 2015 Orange Bowl of the College Football Playoff, then played for the 2016 College Football Playoff National Championship against Alabama, losing 45–40.
2016	Clemson	Clemson defeated Coastal Division champion Virginia Tech and made the College Football Playoff as the #2 seed. It would defeat Ohio State 31–0 in the Fiesta Bowl and Alabama 35–31 in the CFP national championship game.
2017	Clemson	Clemson defeated Coastal Division champion Miami. Clemson lost in the playoff semi-finals with a 24–6 loss to Alabama in the Sugar Bowl.
2018	Clemson	Clemson defeated Coastal Division champion Pitt. They would go on to beat Notre Dame in the CFP Cotton Bowl 30–3, then would go on to defeat Alabama 44–16 in the CFP National Championship. It would be the Tigers 2nd national championship in 3 years and 3rd overall (1981, 2016, 2018). The modern era's first 15–0 team.
2019	Clemson	Clemson defeated Coastal Division champion Virginia. It would defeat Ohio State in the CFP Fiesta Bowl, then lose to LSU in the CFP National Championship.
2020	Clemson	Clemson defeated Notre Dame, who were playing this season acting as an ACC football member and thus, eligible for a berth in the championship game.
2021	Pittsburgh	Pittsburgh defeated Atlantic Division champion Wake Forest. It was the first championship since 2014 that did not see Clemson win the ACC.
2022	Clemson	Clemson defeated Coastal Division winner North Carolina.
2023	Florida State	Florida State defeated the regular season second place Louisville.
2024	Clemson	#17 Clemson defeated the regular season first place, #8 SMU, by a final score of 34-31.
2025	Duke	Duke defeated the regular season first place, Virginia, by a final score of 27-20 (OT)

‡ indicates a title that was vacated by the NCAA

== Championships by school ==
School	Championships	Years
Clemson	22	1956, 1958, 1959, 1965†, 1966, 1967, 1978, 1981, 1982, 1986, 1987, 1988, 1991, 2011, 2015, 2016, 2017, 2018, 2019, 2020, 2022, 2024
Florida State	16	1992, 1993, 1994, 1995†, 1996, 1997, 1998†, 1999, 2000, 2002, 2003, 2005, 2012, 2013, 2014, 2023
Maryland ^	9	1953†, 1955†, 1974, 1975, 1976, 1983, 1984, 1985, 2001
Duke	8	1953†, 1954, 1955†, 1960, 1961, 1962, 1989†, 2025
NC State	7	1957, 1963†, 1964, 1965†, 1968, 1973, 1979
North Carolina	5	1963†, 1971, 1972, 1977, 1980
Virginia Tech	4	2004, 2007, 2008, 2010
Georgia Tech	2	1990, 1998†, 2009‡
Virginia	2	1989†, 1995†
Wake Forest	2	1970, 2006
South Carolina ^	1	1969
Pittsburgh	1	2021
Louisville	0	
Miami (FL)	0	
Boston College	0	
California	0	
SMU	0	
Syracuse	0	
Stanford	0	
Notre Dame °	0	

† Co-champions

‡ Georgia Tech was forced to vacate the 2009 ACC Championship in response to NCAA violations

^ Team is no longer in the ACC

° Team is independent in football (no conference representation)
