= 2005 Peach Bowl =

American college football game

2005 Chick-fil-A Peach Bowl
- 38th Peach Bowl
Miami Hurricanes	LSU Tigers
(9–2)	(10–2)
ACC	SEC
3	40
Head coach: Larry Coker	Head coach: Les Miles
AP / Coaches / BCS; 9 / 9 / 8	AP / Coaches / BCS; 10 / 10 / 12
	1	2	3	4	Total
Miami	3	0	0	0	3
LSU	3	17	14	6	40
- Date: December 30, 2005
- Season: 2005
- Stadium: Georgia Dome
- Location: Atlanta, Georgia
- Referee: Jon Bible (Big 12)
- Attendance: 65,620

United States TV coverage
- Network: ESPN
- Announcers: Brad Nessler, Bob Griese, Lynn Swann

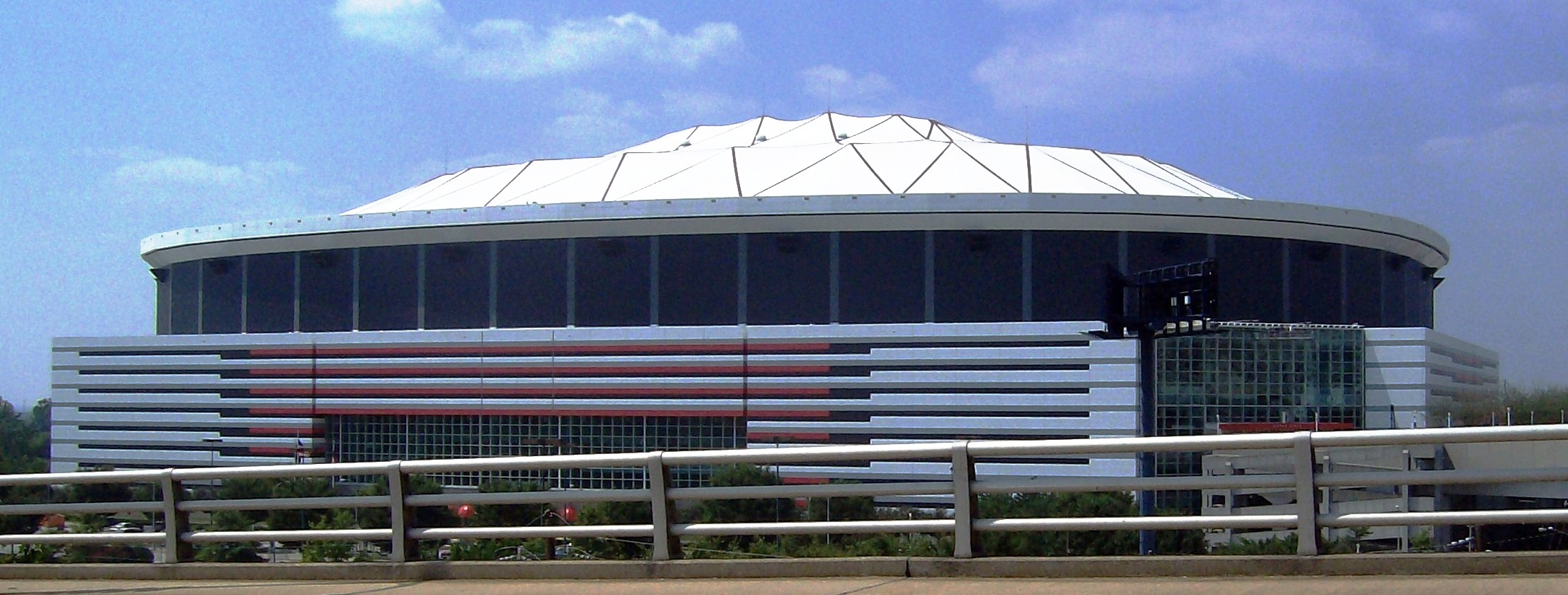
The Georgia Dome in Atlanta, Georgia, hosted the Peach Bowl.

The 2005 Peach Bowl was a college football bowl game played on December 30, 2005, at the Georgia Dome in Atlanta Georgia. The game feature two teams ranked in the top-10 of the AP Poll, as the ninth-ranked Miami Hurricanes battled the 10th-ranked LSU Tigers. The game was the 38th edition of the Peach Bowl and, with sponsorship from Chick-fil-A, was officially the Chick-fil-A Peach Bowl; this would be the final time until 2014 that "Peach" was included in the bowl's name.

Miami took an early 3–0 lead on a 21-yard field goal from Jon Peattie. LSU responded with Chris Jackson kicking a 37-yard field goal as the teams were tied at 3 after one quarter. In the second quarter, backup quarterback Matt Flynn threw a 51-yard touchdown pass to wide receiver Craig Davis as LSU led 10–3. A 47-yard Chris Jackson field goal, and a 4-yard touchdown pass from Flynn to Joseph Addai gave the Tigers a 20–3 halftime lead.

In the third quarter, Addai scored on a 6-yard touchdown run extending the lead to 27–3. Jacob Hester's one-yard touchdown run gave the Tigers a 34–3 lead. In the fourth quarter, Mario Stevenson and Chris Jackson kicked field goals to give the Tigers the 40–3 win.
