= 2005 Miami Hurricanes football team =

American college football season

2005 Miami Hurricanes football

Peach Bowl, L 3–40 vs. LSU
- Conference: Atlantic Coast Conference
- Coastal

Ranking
- Coaches: No. 18
- AP: No. 17
- Record: 9–3 (6–2 ACC)
- Head coach: Larry Coker (5th season)
- Offensive coordinator: Dan Werner (2nd season)
- Offensive scheme: Pro-style
- Defensive coordinator: Randy Shannon (5th season)
- Base defense: 4–3 Cover 2
- Home stadium: Miami Orange Bowl (Capacity: 72,319)

2005 Atlantic Coast Conference football standings
	Conf.			Overall
Team	W		L	W		L
Atlantic Division
No. 23 Florida State xy$	5	–	3	8	–	5
No. 18 Boston College x	5	–	3	9	–	3
No. 21 Clemson	4	–	4	8	–	4
Wake Forest	3	–	5	4	–	7
NC State	3	–	5	7	–	5
Maryland	3	–	5	5	–	6
Coastal Division
No. 7 Virginia Tech x	7	–	1	11	–	2
No. 17 Miami (FL)	6	–	2	9	–	3
Georgia Tech	5	–	3	7	–	5
North Carolina	4	–	4	5	–	6
Virginia	3	–	5	7	–	5
Duke	0	–	8	1	–	10
Championship: Florida State 27, Virginia Tech 22
$ – BCS representative as conference champion; x – Division champion/co-champions; y – Championship game participant; Rankings from AP Poll

The 2005 Miami Hurricanes football team represented the University of Miami during the 2005 NCAA Division I-A football season. It was the Hurricanes' 80th season of football and 2nd as a member of the Atlantic Coast Conference. The Hurricanes were led by fifth-year head coach Larry Coker and played their home games at the Orange Bowl. They finished the season 9–3 overall and 6–2 in the ACC to finish in second place in the Coastal Division. They were invited to the Peach Bowl where they lost to LSU, 40–3.

== Season ==
Miami dropped its first game of the season at archrival Florida State, 10–7, when punter/holder Brian Monroe fumbled the snap on a 28-yard game-tying field goal attempt by kicker Jon Peattie with 2:16 left to play in the fourth quarter. Despite gaining 313 yards of offense to Florida State's 170, Miami lost to its archrival for the first time since 1999 (6 straight wins by Miami). The three turnovers, two missed field goals, and a muffed hold on the game-tying field goal attempt were also a contributing factor in the outcome for Miami.

The Hurricanes rebounded by winning 8 straight games (including a 27–7 win over previously unbeaten Virginia Tech in Blacksburg) and climbed to the #3 spot in both polls. However, any hopes of a sixth national championship were dashed when the Hurricanes were upset, 14–10, by Georgia Tech at home on November 19 (the game was originally scheduled for October 22, but was postponed in the wake of Hurricane Wilma). The Miami offense, which had problems all season, sputtered badly against Georgia Tech and quarterback Kyle Wright was booed continuously during the second half of the game by the Orange Bowl crowd for his ineffective play. The loss also knocked Miami out of a spot in the inaugural ACC Championship Game.

Miami finished the regular season at 9–2 (6–2 ACC), ranked #9 in both polls, and received an invitation to return to the Peach Bowl to face the 10th-ranked LSU Tigers. However, this trip to Atlanta was much different from the Hurricanes' last visit, as Wright and the Miami offense struggled, and the defense, which had been the top-ranked defense in Division I-A for most of the season, was shredded by the LSU offense. Miami was routed, 40–3, in the worst-bowl loss in the program's history. The 'Canes finished the 2005 campaign with a 9–3 record and ranked #18/17 (USA Today/AP).

== Aftermath ==
Coker's three-loss seasons at Miami were viewed as failures, and the season-opening loss to FSU and the bowl loss to LSU made the 2005 campaign particularly difficult for alumni and fans of the proud program to swallow. The Hurricane offense had been the center of criticism all season long (as well as during the two previous seasons). In particular, offensive coordinator Dan Werner, offensive line coach Art Kehoe, and quarterback Kyle Wright were assigned most of the blame. In the aftermath of the Peach Bowl loss, head coach Larry Coker fired four assistants: Werner, Kehoe, running backs coach Don Soldinger, and linebacker coach Vernon Hargreaves. Kehoe's firing was particularly controversial, as he had been with the program as a player and then a coach for over 25 years and took part in all five of Miami's national championships.

With Miami failing to win a conference championship or go to a BCS bowl the previous two years and not having won a national championship since 2001, it was widely assumed that Coker would enter the 2006 season on the hot seat and need to take Miami to a BCS bowl to keep his job.

== Schedule ==
Date	Time	Opponent	Rank	Site	TV	Result	Attendance
September 5	8:00 PM	at No. 14 Florida State	No. 9	Doak Campbell Stadium; Tallahassee, FL (rivalry)	ABC	L 7–10	84,347
September 17	3:30 PM	at No. 20 Clemson	No. 13	Memorial Stadium; Clemson, SC	ABC	W 36–30 ^{3OT}	79,135
September 24	12:00 PM	Colorado*	No. 12	Miami Orange Bowl; Miami, FL	ABC	W 23–3	51,228
October 1	8:00 PM	South Florida*	No. 9	Miami Orange Bowl; Miami, FL	ESPNU	W 27–7	58,308
October 8	3:30 PM	Duke	No. 9	Miami Orange Bowl; Miami, FL	ESPNU	W 52–7	40,314
October 15	1:00 PM	at Temple*	No. 7	Lincoln Financial Field; Philadelphia, PA	FSN	W 34–3	23,129
October 29	12:00 PM	North Carolina	No. 6	Miami Orange Bowl; Miami, FL	ESPN2	W 34–16	30,618
November 5	7:45 PM	at No. 3 Virginia Tech	No. 5	Lane Stadium; Blacksburg, VA (rivalry, College GameDay)	ESPN	W 27–7	65,115
November 12	3:30 PM	at Wake Forest	No. 3	Groves Stadium; Winston-Salem, NC	ABC	W 47–17	27,106
November 19	7:45 PM	Georgia Tech	No. 3	Miami Orange Bowl; Miami, FL	ESPN	L 10–14	53,764
November 26	3:30 PM	Virginia	No. 10	Miami Orange Bowl; Miami, FL	ABC	W 25–17	37,629
December 30	7:30 PM	vs. No. 10 LSU*	No. 9	Georgia Dome; Atlanta, GA (Peach Bowl)	ESPN	L 3–40	65,620
*Non-conference game; Rankings from AP Poll released prior to the game; All times are in Eastern time

== Rankings ==
Ranking movements Legend: ██ Increase in ranking ██ Decrease in ranking
	Week															
Poll	Pre	1	2	3	4	5	6	7	8	9	10	11	12	13	14	Final
AP	9	14	13	12	9	9	7	6	6	5	3	3	10	10	9	17
Coaches	8	14	13	12	10	8	6	6	6	5	4	3	10	10	9	18
Harris	Not released				9	7	6	6	6	5	3	3	10	10	9	Not released
BCS	Not released							8	7	6	4	3	9	9	8	Not released

== Awards and honors ==
=== First Team All-Americans ===
- Kelly Jennings, CB (Sports Illustrated)
- Brandon Meriweather, FS (Football Writers Association of America, ABC Sports)
- Eric Winston, LT (Walter Camp Foundation, American Football Coaches Association, Sports Illustrated)

=== All-ACC Selections (First Team) ===
- Devin Hester, KR/PR
- Kelly Jennings, CB
- Tyrone Moss, RB
- Eric Winston, LT

=== Awards Finalists ===
Bold indicates winners

- **Eric Winston**, LT – **Jacobs Trophy** (Top ACC Lineman)

=== Jack Harding University of Miami MVP Award ===
- Eric Winston, LT
