= 2005 Clemson Tigers football team =

American college football season

2005 Clemson Tigers football

Champs Sports Bowl champion

Champs Sports Bowl, W 19–10 vs. Colorado
- Conference: Atlantic Coast Conference
- Atlantic Division

Ranking
- Coaches: No. 21
- AP: No. 21
- Record: 8–4 (4–4 ACC)
- Head coach: Tommy Bowden (7th season)
- Offensive coordinator: Rob Spence (1st season)
- Offensive scheme: Multiple
- Defensive coordinator: Vic Koenning (1st season)
- Base defense: 4–3
- Captains: Charles Bennett; Jamaal Fudge; Steven Jackson; Charlie Whitehurst
- Home stadium: Memorial Stadium

2005 Atlantic Coast Conference football standings
	Conf.			Overall
Team	W		L	W		L
Atlantic Division
No. 23 Florida State xy$	5	–	3	8	–	5
No. 18 Boston College x	5	–	3	9	–	3
No. 21 Clemson	4	–	4	8	–	4
Wake Forest	3	–	5	4	–	7
NC State	3	–	5	7	–	5
Maryland	3	–	5	5	–	6
Coastal Division
No. 7 Virginia Tech x	7	–	1	11	–	2
No. 17 Miami (FL)	6	–	2	9	–	3
Georgia Tech	5	–	3	7	–	5
North Carolina	4	–	4	5	–	6
Virginia	3	–	5	7	–	5
Duke	0	–	8	1	–	10
Championship: Florida State 27, Virginia Tech 22
$ – BCS representative as conference champion; x – Division champion/co-champions; y – Championship game participant; Rankings from AP Poll

The 2005 Clemson Tigers football team represented Clemson University as a member of the Atlantic Coast Conference (ACC) during the 2005 NCAA Division I-A football season. Led by seventh-year head coach Tommy Bowden, the Tigers compiled an overall record of 8–4 with a mark of 4–4 in conference play, placing third in the ACC's Atlantic Division. Clemson was invited to the Champs Sports Bowl, where the Tigers defeated Colorado. The team played home games at Memorial Stadium in Clemson, South Carolina.

Clemson started off its season with wins over a ranked Texas A&M team and the Maryland Terrapins. The Tigers then lost the three games, to the Miami Hurricanes, Boston College, and Wake Forest. The losses to Miami and Boston College came in overtime. Clemson rebounded to win the next two games against NC State and Temple. The next week, Clemson lost a close game to Georgia Tech. Clemson then closed out the regular season with three straight wins, over Duke, Florida State, and instate rival South Carolina.

Clemson finished the season ranked in the top 25, No. 21 in both the AP poll and the Coaches Poll, for the second time in three years. The Tigers also recorded wins against three AP top 20 teams in the 2005 season for just the fourth time in program history.

== Schedule ==
Date	Time	Opponent	Rank	Site	TV	Result	Attendance	Source
September 3	8:00 p.m.	No. 17 Texas A&M*		Memorial Stadium; Clemson, SC	ABC	W 25–24	79,917	
September 10	12:00 p.m.	at Maryland	No. 25	Byrd Stadium; College Park, MD	ESPN	W 28–24	50,637	
September 17	3:30 p.m.	No. 13 Miami (FL)	No. 20	Memorial Stadium; Clemson, SC	ABC	L 30–36 ^{3OT}	79,135	
September 24	12:00 p.m.	Boston College		Memorial Stadium; Clemson, SC (rivalry)	JPS	L 13–16 ^{OT}	77,684	
October 1	3:30 p.m.	at Wake Forest		Groves Stadium; Winston-Salem, NC	ESPNU	L 27–37	32,153	
October 13	7:45 p.m.	at NC State		Carter–Finley Stadium; Raleigh, NC (Textile Bowl)	ESPN	W 31–10	57,500	
October 22	12:30 p.m.	Temple*		Memorial Stadium; Clemson, SC	CN8	W 37–7	74,841	
October 29	3:30 p.m.	at Georgia Tech		Bobby Dodd Stadium; Atlanta, GA (rivalry)	ESPN	L 9–10	55,000	
November 5	1:00 p.m.	Duke^{†}		Memorial Stadium; Clemson, SC		W 49–20	77,278	
November 12	12:00 p.m.	No. 17 Florida State		Memorial Stadium; Clemson, SC (rivalry)	ESPN	W 35–14	80,536	
November 19	7:00 p.m.	at No. 19 South Carolina*		Williams–Brice Stadium; Columbia, SC (rivalry)	ESPN2	W 13–9	83,368	
December 27	5:00 p.m.	vs. Colorado*	No. 23	Florida Citrus Bowl; Orlando, FL (Champs Sports Bowl)	ESPN	W 19–10	31,470	
*Non-conference game; ^{†}Homecoming; Rankings from AP Poll released prior to the game; All times are in Eastern time

== Roster ==
2005 Clemson Tigers football team roster
Players			Coaches
Offense: Pos. / # / Name / Class; QB / 6 / Charlie Whitehurst / Sr	Defense: Pos. / # / Name / Class	Special teams: Pos. / # / Name / Class	Head coach: Tommy Bowden; Coordinators/assistant coaches: David Blackwell – Linebackers/recruiting coordinator; Legend: (C) Team captain; (S) Suspended; (I) Ineligible; Injured; Redshirt; Roster
