= 2005 Maryland Terrapins football team =

American college football season

2005 Maryland Terrapins football
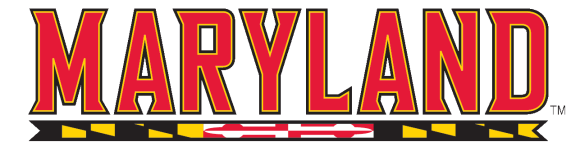
- Conference: Atlantic Coast Conference
- Atlantic Division
- Record: 5–6 (3–5 ACC)
- Head coach: Ralph Friedgen (5th season)
- Home stadium: Byrd Stadium

2005 Atlantic Coast Conference football standings
	Conf.			Overall
Team	W		L	W		L
Atlantic Division
No. 23 Florida State xy$	5	–	3	8	–	5
No. 18 Boston College x	5	–	3	9	–	3
No. 21 Clemson	4	–	4	8	–	4
Wake Forest	3	–	5	4	–	7
NC State	3	–	5	7	–	5
Maryland	3	–	5	5	–	6
Coastal Division
No. 7 Virginia Tech x	7	–	1	11	–	2
No. 17 Miami (FL)	6	–	2	9	–	3
Georgia Tech	5	–	3	7	–	5
North Carolina	4	–	4	5	–	6
Virginia	3	–	5	7	–	5
Duke	0	–	8	1	–	10
Championship: Florida State 27, Virginia Tech 22
$ – BCS representative as conference champion; x – Division champion/co-champions; y – Championship game participant; Rankings from AP Poll

The 2005 Maryland Terrapins football team represented the University of Maryland in the 2005 NCAA Division I FBS football season. It was the Terrapins' 53rd season as a member of the Atlantic Coast Conference (ACC) and its first within the framework of the ACC Atlantic Division. Ralph Friedgen led the team for his fifth season as head coach.

== Schedule ==
Date	Time	Opponent	Site	TV	Result	Attendance
September 3	6:00 pm	vs. Navy*	M&T Bank Stadium; Baltimore, MD (Crab Bowl Classic)	CSTV	W 23–20	67,809
September 10	12:00 pm	No. 25 Clemson	Byrd Stadium; College Park, MD	ESPN	L 24–28	50,609
September 17	12:00 pm	West Virginia*	Byrd Stadium; College Park, MD (rivalry)	JPS	L 19–31	52,413
September 24	3:30 pm	at Wake Forest	Groves Stadium; Winston-Salem, NC	ESPNU	W 22–12	26,022
October 1	12:00 pm	No. 19 Virginia^{†}	Byrd Stadium; College Park, MD (rivalry)	JPS	W 45–33	52,656
October 8	1:00 pm	at Temple*	Lincoln Financial Field; Philadelphia, PA		W 38–7	11,311
October 20	7:30 pm	No. 3 Virginia Tech	Byrd Stadium; College Park, MD	ESPN	L 9–28	54,838
October 29	3:30 pm	at No. 10 Florida State	Doak Campbell Stadium; Tallahassee, FL	ABC	L 27–35	82,626
November 12	12:00 pm	at North Carolina	Kenan Memorial Stadium; Chapel Hill, NC	JPS	W 33–30 ^{OT}	50,000
November 19	12:00 pm	No. 23 Boston College	Byrd Stadium; College Park, MD	JPS	L 16–31	51,585
November 26	12:00 pm	at NC State	Carter–Finley Stadium; Raleigh, NC	ESPN	L 14–20	52,312
*Non-conference game; ^{†}Homecoming; Rankings from AP Poll released prior to the game; All times are in Eastern time

== 2006 NFL draft ==
The following players were selected in the 2006 NFL draft.

Player	Position	Round	Overall	NFL team
Vernon Davis	Tight end	1	6	San Francisco 49ers
D'Qwell Jackson	Linebacker	2	34	Cleveland Browns
Gerrick McPhearson	Defensive back	7	232	New York Giants
