= 2005 Duke Blue Devils football team =

American college football season

2005 Duke Blue Devils football
- Conference: Atlantic Coast Conference
- Coastal Division
- Record: 1–10 (0–8 ACC)
- Head coach: Ted Roof (2nd season)
- Offensive coordinator: Bill O'Brien (1st season)
- Offensive scheme: Pro-style
- Co-defensive coordinators: Scott Brown (2nd season); Jerry Azzinaro (2nd season)
- Base defense: Multiple 4–3
- MVP: John Talley
- Captains: Phillip Alexander; Brendan Dewan; Ronnie Elliott
- Home stadium: Wallace Wade Stadium

2005 Atlantic Coast Conference football standings
	Conf.			Overall
Team	W		L	W		L
Atlantic Division
No. 23 Florida State xy$	5	–	3	8	–	5
No. 18 Boston College x	5	–	3	9	–	3
No. 21 Clemson	4	–	4	8	–	4
Wake Forest	3	–	5	4	–	7
NC State	3	–	5	7	–	5
Maryland	3	–	5	5	–	6
Coastal Division
No. 7 Virginia Tech x	7	–	1	11	–	2
No. 17 Miami (FL)	6	–	2	9	–	3
Georgia Tech	5	–	3	7	–	5
North Carolina	4	–	4	5	–	6
Virginia	3	–	5	7	–	5
Duke	0	–	8	1	–	10
Championship: Florida State 27, Virginia Tech 22
$ – BCS representative as conference champion; x – Division champion/co-champions; y – Championship game participant; Rankings from AP Poll

The 2005 Duke Blue Devils football team represented the Duke University in the 2005 NCAA Division I-A football season. The team was led by head coach Ted Roof. They played their homes games at Wallace Wade Stadium in Durham, North Carolina.

== Schedule ==
Date	Time	Opponent	Site	TV	Result	Attendance	Source
September 3	1:00 pm	at East Carolina*	Dowdy–Ficklen Stadium; Greenville, NC	CSTV	L 21–24	35,107	
September 10	12:00 pm	No. 7 Virginia Tech	Wallace Wade Stadium; Durham, NC	JPS	L 0–45	25,014	
September 17	1:00 pm	VMI*	Wallace Wade Stadium; Durham, NC		W 40–14	10,126	
September 24	3:30 pm	at No. 23 Virginia	Scott Stadium; Charlottesville, VA	ESPN360	L 7–38	61,021	
October 1	1:00 pm	Navy*^{†}	Wallace Wade Stadium; Durham, NC		L 21–28	15,246	
October 8	3:30 pm	at No. 9 Miami (FL)	Orange Bowl; Miami, FL	ESPNU	L 7–52	40,315	
October 15	3:30 pm	Georgia Tech	Wallace Wade Stadium; Durham, NC	ESPNU	L 10–35	17,451	
October 22	3:30 pm	No. 11 Florida State	Wallace Wade Stadium; Durham, NC	ESPNU	L 24–55	21,731	
October 29	12:00 pm	Wake Forest	Wallace Wade Stadium; Durham, NC (rivalry)	JPS	L 6–44	15,347	
November 5	1:00 pm	at Clemson	Memorial Stadium; Clemson, SC		L 20–49	77,278	
November 19	1:00 pm	at North Carolina	Kenan Memorial Stadium; Chapel Hill, NC (Victory Bell)		L 21–24	55,000	
*Non-conference game; ^{†}Homecoming; Rankings from AP Poll released prior to the game; All times are in Eastern time
