= 2005 Wake Forest Demon Deacons football team =

American college football season

2005 Wake Forest Demon Deacons football
- Conference: Atlantic Coast Conference
- Atlantic Division
- Record: 4–7 (3–5 ACC)
- Head coach: Jim Grobe (5th season)
- Offensive coordinator: Steed Lobotzke (3rd season)
- Offensive scheme: Spread
- Defensive coordinator: Dean Hood (5th season)
- Base defense: 4–3
- Captains: Goryal Scales; Steve Vallos
- Home stadium: Groves Stadium

2005 Atlantic Coast Conference football standings
	Conf.			Overall
Team	W		L	W		L
Atlantic Division
No. 23 Florida State xy$	5	–	3	8	–	5
No. 18 Boston College x	5	–	3	9	–	3
No. 21 Clemson	4	–	4	8	–	4
Wake Forest	3	–	5	4	–	7
NC State	3	–	5	7	–	5
Maryland	3	–	5	5	–	6
Coastal Division
No. 7 Virginia Tech x	7	–	1	11	–	2
No. 17 Miami (FL)	6	–	2	9	–	3
Georgia Tech	5	–	3	7	–	5
North Carolina	4	–	4	5	–	6
Virginia	3	–	5	7	–	5
Duke	0	–	8	1	–	10
Championship: Florida State 27, Virginia Tech 22
$ – BCS representative as conference champion; x – Division champion/co-champions; y – Championship game participant; Rankings from AP Poll

The 2005 Wake Forest Demon Deacons football team was an American football team that represented Wake Forest University as a member of the Atlantic Coast Conference (ACC) during the 2005 NCAA Division I-A football season. In their fifth season under head coach Jim Grobe, the Demon Deacons compiled a 4–7 record (3–5 in conference games), finished in fourth place in the Atlantic Division of the ACC, and were outscored by a total of 316 to 269.

The team's statistical leaders included quarterbacks Ben Mauk (845 passing yars) and Cory Randolph (821 passing yards); Chris Barclay (1,127 rushing yards); Nate Morton (482 receiving yards); Sam Swank (86 points on 29 extra points and 19 field goals); Jon Abbate (77 total tackles); and Josh Gattis (46 solo tackles).

Punter Ryan Plackemeier had 67 punts for 3,165 yards, an average f 47.2 yards per punt.

Two Wake Forest players received first-team honors on the 2005 All-Atlantic Coast Conference football team: Barclay at running back and Plackemeier at punter. Defensive back Josh Gattis was named to the second team.

The team played its home games at Groves Stadium in Winston-Salem, North Carolina.

== Schedule ==
Date	Time	Opponent	Site	TV	Result	Attendance	Source
September 1	7:00 pm	Vanderbilt*	Groves Stadium; Winston-Salem, NC	ESPNU	L 20–24	25,384	
September 10	7:00 pm	at Nebraska*	Memorial Stadium; Lincoln, NE	TBS	L 3–31	77,380	
September 17	6:30 pm	East Carolina*	Groves Stadium; Winston-Salem, NC		W 44–34	29,563	
September 24	3:30 pm	Maryland^{†}	Groves Stadium; Winston-Salem, NC	ESPNU	L 12–22	26,022	
October 1	3:30 pm	Clemson	Groves Stadium; Winston-Salem, NC	ESPNU	W 31–27	32,153	
October 8	12:00 pm	at No. 4 Florida State	Doak Campbell Stadium; Tallahassee, FL	JPS	L 24–41	82,589	
October 15	12:00 pm	at No. 14 Boston College	Alumni Stadium; Chestnut Hill, MA	JPS	L 30–35	33,632	
October 22	3:30 pm	NC State	Groves Stadium; Winston-Salem, NC (rivalry)		W 27–19	33,316	
October 29	12:00 pm	at Duke	Wallace Wade Stadium; Durham, NC (rivalry)	JPS	W 44–6	15,347	
November 5	1:30 pm	at Georgia Tech	Bobby Dodd Stadium; Atlanta, GA		L 17–30	51,571	
November 12	3:30 pm	No. 3 Miami (FL)	Groves Stadium; Winston-Salem, NC	ABC	L 17–47	27,106	
*Non-conference game; ^{†}Homecoming; Rankings from AP Poll released prior to the game; All times are in Eastern time

== Team leaders ==
Category	Team Leader	Att/Cth	Yds
Passing	Ben Mauk	85/158	845
Rushing	Chris Barclay	218	1,127
Receiving	Nate Morton	39	482
