= 2005 ACC Championship Game =

2005 Dr. Pepper ACC Championship Game
- Conference Championship
Virginia Tech Hokies	Florida State Seminoles
(10–1)	(7–4)
22	27
Head coach: Frank Beamer	Head coach: Bobby Bowden
AP / Coaches / BCS; 5 / 5 / 5
	1	2	3	4	Total
Virginia Tech	3	0	0	19	22
Florida State	3	0	24	0	27
- Date: December 3, 2005
- Season: 2005
- Stadium: Alltel Stadium
- Location: Jacksonville, Florida
- MVP: WR Willie Reid, Florida State
- Favorite: Virginia Tech by 14
- Referee: Jack Childress
- Attendance: 72,749

United States TV coverage
- Network: ABC
- Announcers: Brent Musburger, Jack Arute, and Gary Danielson
- Nielsen ratings: 5.1

The 2005 Dr. Pepper ACC Championship Game was the inaugural contest of the championship game for the recently expanded Atlantic Coast Conference (ACC). It was a regular season-ending American college football contest held at Alltel Stadium in Jacksonville, Florida, between the Virginia Tech Hokies and the Florida State Seminoles. The game decided the winner of the ACC football championship. Florida State University (FSU) defeated Virginia Tech 27–22 in a game characterized by penalties, defense, and a fourth-quarter comeback attempt by Virginia Tech. The game was the final contest of the regular season for the teams, as bowl games are not considered part of the regular season.

Virginia Tech entered the 2005 season having won the 2004 ACC Championship, the last to be awarded without playing a championship game at the end of the season. Tech won their first eight games and appeared to be on course to have an untroubled run to the ACC Championship Game. But against the fifth-ranked Miami Hurricanes, Tech suffered their first defeat of the season, losing 27–7 on November 5. Because each team had one ACC loss (Miami had previously lost to Florida State) and the Hurricanes had the tie-breaking head-to-head win, Miami had the lead in the Coastal Division. But Miami later lost a second ACC game to the Georgia Tech Yellow Jackets, and the Hurricanes were knocked out of contention for the Coastal Division title in favor of the Hokies, who lost only to Miami.

Florida State earned their bid to the ACC Championship Game by fighting through an Atlantic Division schedule that included several nationally ranked teams. After defeating ninth-ranked Miami in their opening contest, the Seminoles won their next four games before losing at Virginia in a close match. Additional losses to North Carolina State and Clemson at the end of the season almost eliminated the Seminoles from contention for a spot in the championship game. But losses by Clemson and the other Atlantic Division leaders gave the Seminoles a second chance and set up an ACC Championship Game between Florida State and Virginia Tech. They had previously played in the 2000 National Championship Game, and the rematch served as a point of public interest.

The first two quarters of the game were characterized by defense and penalties that stifled both teams' offenses. In the second half, Florida State took advantage of a punt return for a touchdown to begin a third-quarter surge. Although Virginia Tech made a late-game comeback, Florida State ran out the clock and secured a 27–22 victory. Florida State's win earned it the 2005 ACC Championship and a bid to the 2006 Orange Bowl against Penn State. Virginia Tech was awarded a bid to the 2006 Gator Bowl against Louisville. Following that game, Tech quarterback Marcus Vick was released from the team due to repeated violations of team rules and several legal infractions.

== Selection process ==
2005 Atlantic Coast Conference football standings
	Conf.			Overall
Team	W		L	W		L
Atlantic Division
No. 23 Florida State xy$	5	–	3	8	–	5
No. 18 Boston College x	5	–	3	9	–	3
No. 21 Clemson	4	–	4	8	–	4
Wake Forest	3	–	5	4	–	7
NC State	3	–	5	7	–	5
Maryland	3	–	5	5	–	6
Coastal Division
No. 7 Virginia Tech x	7	–	1	11	–	2
No. 17 Miami (FL)	6	–	2	9	–	3
Georgia Tech	5	–	3	7	–	5
North Carolina	4	–	4	5	–	6
Virginia	3	–	5	7	–	5
Duke	0	–	8	1	–	10
Championship: Florida State 27, Virginia Tech 22
$ – BCS representative as conference champion; x – Division champion/co-champions; y – Championship game participant; Rankings from AP Poll

The ACC Championship Game traditionally matches the winner of the Coastal and Atlantic Divisions of the Atlantic Coast Conference. Before 2005, no championship game existed. The idea for a championship game originated with the league's 2004 expansion, which added former Big East members Miami, Virginia Tech and (in 2005) Boston College. A request to the National Collegiate Athletic Association by conference officials to hold a championship game following the 2004 season was rejected because the ACC lacked the requisite 12 teams. The league's first championship game had to wait until after the addition of Boston College, which had been delayed by a year. Once they had been added, the ACC consisted of 12 teams, allowing it to hold a conference championship game under NCAA rules. Before the start of the 2005 season, both Virginia Tech and Florida State were picked as pre-season favorites to play in the championship game in an annual poll conducted by members of the media who cover the ACC.

=== Virginia Tech ===
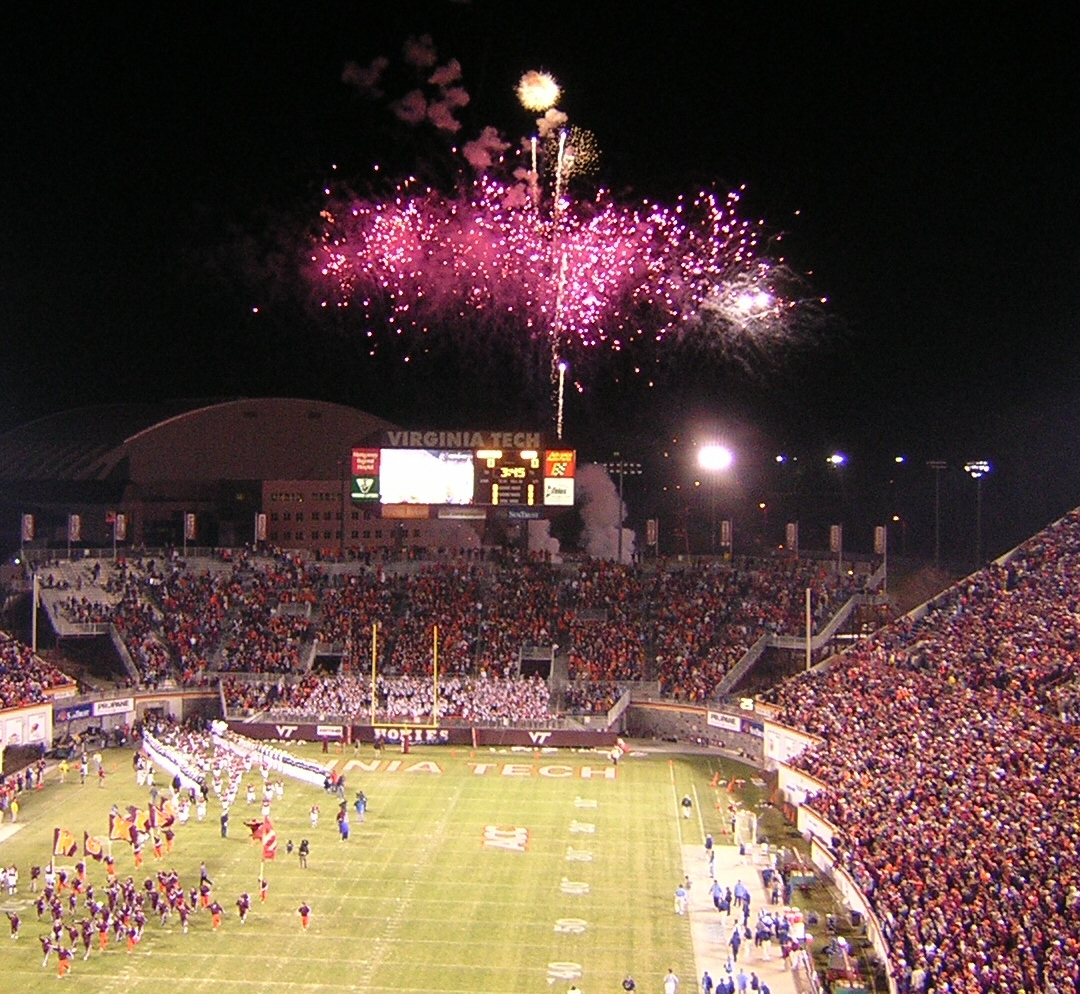
Virginia Tech's late-season win over the University of North Carolina clinched the Coastal Division title and a trip to the inaugural ACC Championship Game for the Hokies.

The Hokies began the 2005 regular season ranked eighth in the country and played their first game at ACC opponent North Carolina State. It was a close-fought game, but quarterback Marcus Vick threw a game-winning touchdown early in the fourth quarter and the defense slowed a late NC State rally as Virginia Tech earned a 20–16 win. Following the near loss to NC State, the Hokies blew out their next several opponents. Virginia Tech defeated Duke and Ohio by scores of 45–0 each. The Virginia Tech defense held Duke's offense to just 35 total yards, an NCAA record. Following those victories, Tech hosted 15th-ranked Georgia Tech, beating the Yellow Jackets by a score of 51–7. Tech's defensive success in those games was typical of the season as they won their first eight games.

In their ninth game, however, the third-ranked team suffered their first loss. On a Thursday night game at home, the Hokies lost 27–7 to the fifth-ranked Miami Hurricanes. Normally, a loss to the division-rival Hurricanes would have knocked the Hokies out of contention for the ACC Championship Game, as Miami had the tie-breaking head-to-head victory and was expected to win the remainder of their games. But because Virginia Tech won the rest of their games and the Hurricanes lost two ACC contests—Virginia Tech's only ACC loss was to Miami—the Hokies won the Coastal Division championship and qualified for the championship game over Miami.

=== Florida State ===
The Seminoles, like Virginia Tech, were picked as pre-season favorites to win their division. Florida State opened their 2005 season against traditional rival Miami, ranked ninth in the country. In a defensive struggle, Florida State managed to upset the favored Hurricanes, 10–7. Following the victory, Florida State went on a four-game winning streak, defeating Syracuse, Boston College, Wake Forest and The Citadel en route to a 5–0 record.

In the Seminoles' sixth season game they traveled to Charlottesville, Virginia, to face the Virginia Cavaliers. In a hard-fought game, the Seminoles lost, 26–21, earning their first loss of the season. After winning their next two games, Florida State lost to NC State, Clemson and 19th-ranked Florida, the first time they had suffered three consecutive losses since 1983. Florida State ended the regular season with a conference record of 5–3. Because one of those losses had been against a Coastal Division opponent, however, Florida State finished with the best Atlantic Division record and was named that division's representative to the ACC Championship Game.

== Pre-game buildup ==
Virginia Tech quarterback Marcus Vick was predicted to be the key player for the favored Virginia Tech Hokies in pregame discussion. He had led the Hokies to a fifth place national ranking and an offense that earned 610 rushing yards in the final two games of the regular season. Off the field, the matchup between head coaches also was a point of interest. At the time, Florida State head coach Bobby Bowden had the most wins of any active head coach in college football. Virginia Tech head coach Frank Beamer was ranked third. Beamer had never defeated Bowden in a game. Before the game, Beamer was named the ACC's 2005 Coach of the Year for the second consecutive year.

In addition, the game was a rematch of the 2000 BCS National Championship Game. In that game, held in New Orleans, Louisiana, Florida State defeated Virginia Tech 46–29, despite the performance of Hokie quarterback Michael Vick, who would later be selected as the first overall pick in the 2001 NFL draft. Vick's brother, Marcus, would be the Hokies' starter at quarterback for the 2005 ACC Championship Game.

=== Offensive matchups ===
==== Virginia Tech ====
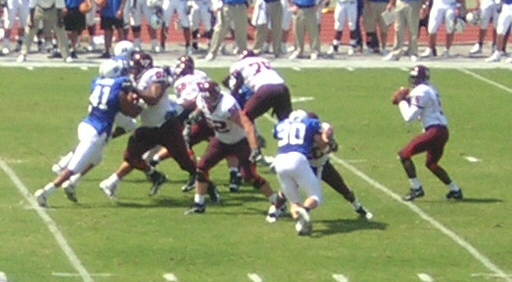
Tech quarterback Marcus Vick (far right), seen here against Duke, was expected by many commentators to have a winning game against Florida State.

Coming off a season-long suspension in 2004, Marcus Vick led the Virginia Tech offence throwing for 1,855 yards, 14 touchdowns and nine interceptions in the 2005 season leading up to the ACC Championship. Vick also ran for four touchdowns during the season and earned first-team All-ACC honors. Receiving his passes were a number of wide receivers and tight ends. Tight end Jeff King, a second-team All-ACC selection, had 20 receptions for 230 yards and five touchdowns for the season before the ACC Championship. Wide receivers Eddie Royal and David Clowney also had statistically significant seasons heading into the conference championship. Royal had 21 catches for 271 yards and two touchdowns during the regular season, while Clowney had 28 catches for 515 yards and three touchdowns.

Virginia Tech's rushing offense was led by several running backs: Mike Imoh, Branden Ore, and Cedric Humes. In 2005, Hokie running back Cedric Humes had accumulated a career-high 134 yards and two touchdowns against North Carolina in the Hokies' final regular-season game. Backup running back Branden Ore ran for 104 yards and a touchdown on 17 attempts, the second time in as many games that Humes and Ore ran for 100 yards or more in the same game. The Hokies ran 31 times in the second half and threw only two passes. A similar running game was predicted for the ACC Championship Game. Imoh, meanwhile, was limited by an ankle injury suffered during the course of the season. Heading into the conference championship game, he had rushed for 415 yards and three touchdowns.

==== Florida State ====
The day before the game, Florida State center David Castillo was named to ESPN The Magazine's Academic All-America Second Team, which recognizes college football players who have achieved academic success. Writers and staffers at the magazine vote on a list of players who are separated into "teams" based on position and performance. Castillo, who was a key component of the Seminoles' offensive line, was also a finalist for the Draddy Trophy, informally known as the "academic Heisman".

FSU quarterback Drew Weatherford recorded a statistically impressive year and was the top freshman quarterback in the nation in terms of passing yardage and passing touchdowns. Wide receivers Willie Reid, Greg Carr and Chris Davis were the primary beneficiaries of Weatherford's passing offense during the 2005 season. Carr, a freshman, caught 27 passes for 593 yards and a conference-leading nine touchdowns. Davis, a junior, caught more passes and recorded more receiving yards during the 2005 season than he had in both his previous seasons combined. Reid, the lone senior starting in the Florida State corps of wide receivers, played in a variety of positions on offense and held the Seminoles' team record for most punt return yardage.

The Seminoles' rushing offense was led by starting running backs Leon Washington and Lorenzo Booker. Booker led the team in rushing yardage, rushing attempts, rushing touchdowns and average yards per game. Washington was the tenth-ranked rusher in Florida State history in terms of rushing yardage.

=== Defensive matchups ===
==== Virginia Tech ====
Heading into the ACC Championship Game, the Virginia Tech defense was ranked first in the nation for total defense and scoring defense. In pass defense, the Hokies were second in the nation, allowing an average of just 88.38 yards a game. ACC rival Miami was first, allowing just 84.57 yards per game on average.

On the field, the Tech defense was captained by safety Justin Hamilton, who recorded 26 tackles and three interceptions during the 2005 season. On the defensive line, Tech's most significant defensive players were defensive ends Chris Ellis and Darryl Tapp. Tapp, an All-ACC selection, recorded 41 tackles (including nine sacks), three forced fumbles, and a blocked field goal. Ellis recorded defensive MVP honors for the Hokies' first-ranked defense. At linebacker, the Hokies started Vince Hall and Xavier Adibi. Hall, a second-team All-ACC performer, led the team in tackles and returned a fumble and an interception for a touchdown during the regular season. Adibi recorded 61 tackles during the season, having recovered from a torn muscle suffered during the 2004 season.

==== Florida State ====
On defense, the Seminoles were led on the defensive line by nose guard Brodrick Bunkley, who ranked among Florida State's historical leaders in tackles for loss. Also on the defensive line was defensive end Kamerion Wimbley, who was among the ACC's leaders in recorded sacks. At linebacker, the Seminoles had A.J. Nicholson, who was a semifinalist for the Butkus Award, traditionally given to the best linebacker in college football.

By the end of the 2005 season, the Seminoles had recorded five blocked kicks, 12 interceptions, and more than 1,000 tackles. The Seminoles finished the season ranked 12th in rushing defense and 14th in total defense.

== Game summary ==
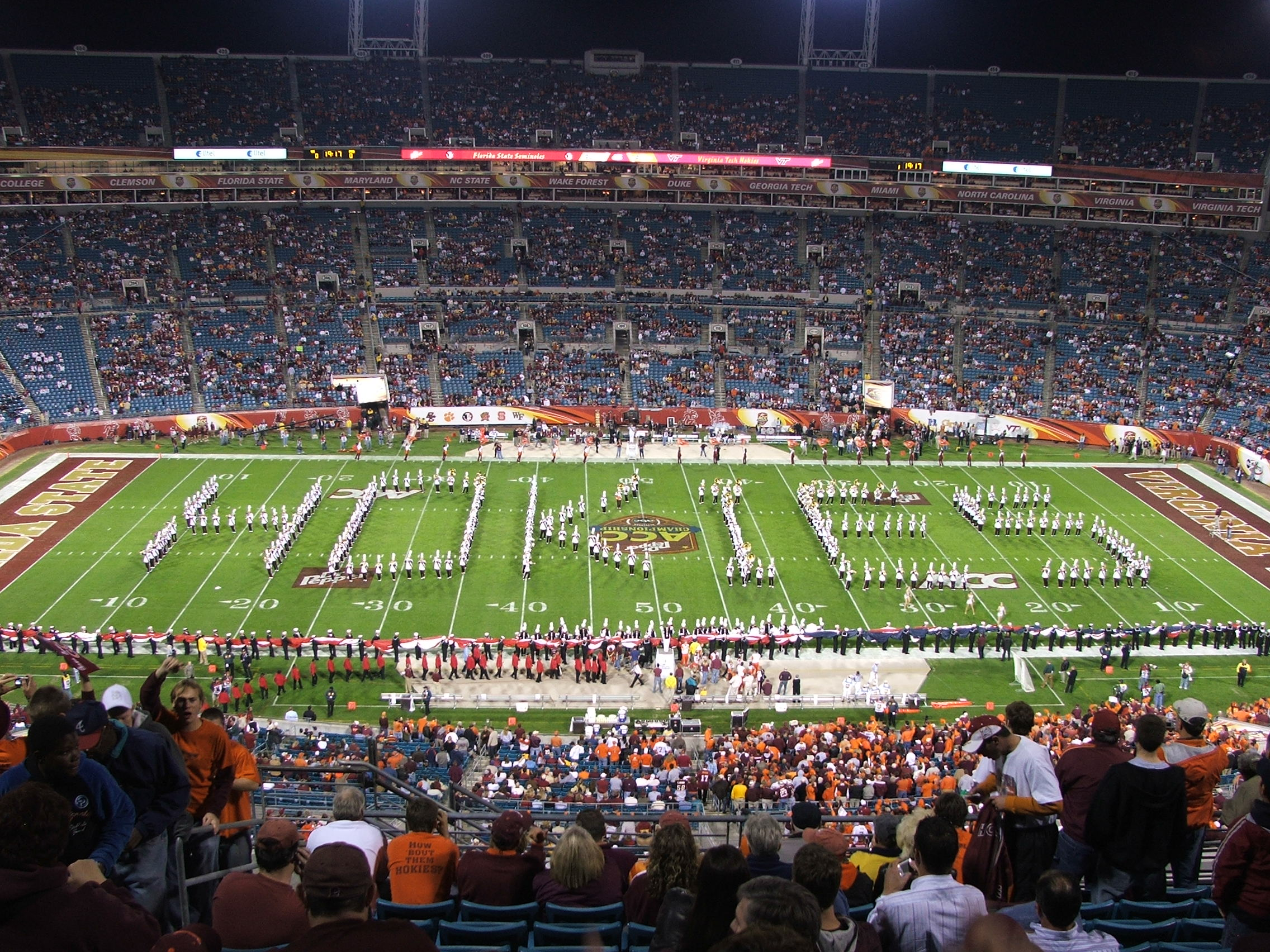
The Marching Virginians perform as part of the pregame festivities before the kickoff of the inaugural ACC Championship Game.

The 2005 ACC Championship Game kicked off in Jacksonville, Florida, at 8:11 p.m. on December 3, 2005. The game was televised by the American Broadcasting Company (ABC) in the United States. It earned a Nielsen rating of 5.1, higher than that of either the Big 12 Championship Game or the Southeastern Conference Championship Game. Brent Musburger, Jack Arute, and Gary Danielson were the game's broadcasters. At kickoff, the weather was mostly cloudy with an air temperature of 67 °F (19 °C) degrees. Approximately 72,429 fans were present at the game, but more than 75,000 tickets had been sold. Virginia Tech won the pre-game coin toss, but elected to defer their choice to the second half. Florida State was forced to have the ball on offense to begin the game.

=== First quarter ===
Florida State received the ball to begin the game and returned the opening kickoff to their 19-yard line. In his opening drive, Seminoles' quarterback Drew Weatherford completed several long passes, including a 37-yard strike from his own 48-yard line to drive the Seminoles' offense inside the Virginia Tech red zone. Once there, however, the Florida State offense began to struggle with the Virginia Tech defense, which had recovered somewhat from the initial shock of Weatherford's offensive success. On the three plays that followed Weatherford's 37-yard pass, Florida State managed only six positive yards. This total was largely negated by a five-yard false start penalty that pushed FSU's offense backward. Facing a fourth down, Florida State coach Bobby Bowden sent in kicker Gary Cismesia to attempt a 31-yard field goal. The kick was successful, and the three points gave Florida State an early 3–0 lead with 11:06 remaining in the quarter.

Virginia Tech's first possession of the game began at their 15-yard line after the Florida State kickoff. Hokie quarterback Marcus Vick completed his first pass of the game, a nine-yard toss to Eddie Royal, and the Hokies picked up a first down on the next play. From there, however, things began to go downhill for the Virginia Tech offense. Vick was sacked on the next play, running back Cedric Humes was tackled for a five-yard loss, and the Hokies committed a five-yard false start penalty. The miscues prevented Virginia Tech from gaining another first down, and the Hokies were forced to punt the ball away. Florida State recovered the kick at the 50-yard line and began their second offensive possession of the game. Although Weatherford completed his first pass of the drive, both subsequent passes were incomplete. The Seminoles punted the ball back to Virginia Tech, and the kick rolled into the end zone for a touchback.

The Florida State touchback allowed Vick to start at his 20-yard line for Virginia Tech's second possession of the game. It began no better than the first one, as Virginia Tech committed a 10-yard holding penalty on the first play. On subsequent plays, however, the Hokie offense began to move the ball with success. Vick completed a 12-yard pass to wide receiver Eddie Royal, and the offense was aided by a 15-yard Florida State penalty, which gave the Hokies an automatic first down. Following the first down, Vick completed the first big Virginia Tech play of the game, throwing the ball 35 yards downfield to Justin Harper, who caught it in Florida State territory. Two more plays pushed Virginia Tech to the edge of the Florida State red zone, but a penalty and another sack prevented the Hokies from advancing the ball further. Virginia Tech was forced to send in kicker Brandon Pace to attempt a 45-yard field goal. The kick was good, and Virginia Tech had tied the game 3–3 with 1:00 remaining in the quarter.

After receiving the post-field goal kickoff, the Florida State offense began another drive. After an incomplete pass and a short rush, Weatherford completed a 12-yard pass for a first down as time expired in the quarter. After 15 minutes of play, the score was tied 3–3, but Drew Weatherford had begun driving Florida State offense down the field.

=== Second quarter ===
Having earned a first down with the final play of the first quarter, Drew Weatherford and the Florida State offense ran into difficulty as the second quarter began. An incomplete pass and a rush for no gain were followed by a false start penalty and another incomplete pass. Florida State was forced to punt. Virginia Tech recovered the ball at their 26-yard line but failed to capitalize on the defensive stop. Marcus Vick threw two incomplete passes and was sacked before Virginia Tech was forced into a punt.

Following the punt, the two teams continued to trade possessions throughout the quarter. Defense dominated, and what few big plays occurred were either neutralized by penalties or stopped by incomplete passes or rushes for no gain. In the second quarter, Virginia Tech punted the ball twice and turned the ball over on downs once. Florida State punted the ball three times and had the ball when time ran out in the quarter. Neither team managed to score, and only twice did either team manage to penetrate their opponent's territory. At halftime, the score remained tied, 3–3.

=== Third quarter ===
Because Florida State had received the game's opening kickoff, Virginia Tech chose to receive the ball to begin the second half. Like the first half, however, the Virginia Tech offense failed to advance the ball in any meaningful fashion. Marcus Vick threw two incompletions and running back Cedric Humes managed a short three-yard dash. Forced to punt the ball away again, Virginia Tech set up the game's critical play. From his 34-yard line, punter Nic Schmitt kicked the ball 49 yards to the Seminoles' Willie Reid, who broke through the Virginia Tech special teams punt coverage for an 89-yard punt-return touchdown. Reid's return was the first touchdown of the game and the first touchdown in ACC Championship Game history. With 13:46 remaining in the third quarter, Florida State had taken a 10–3 lead.

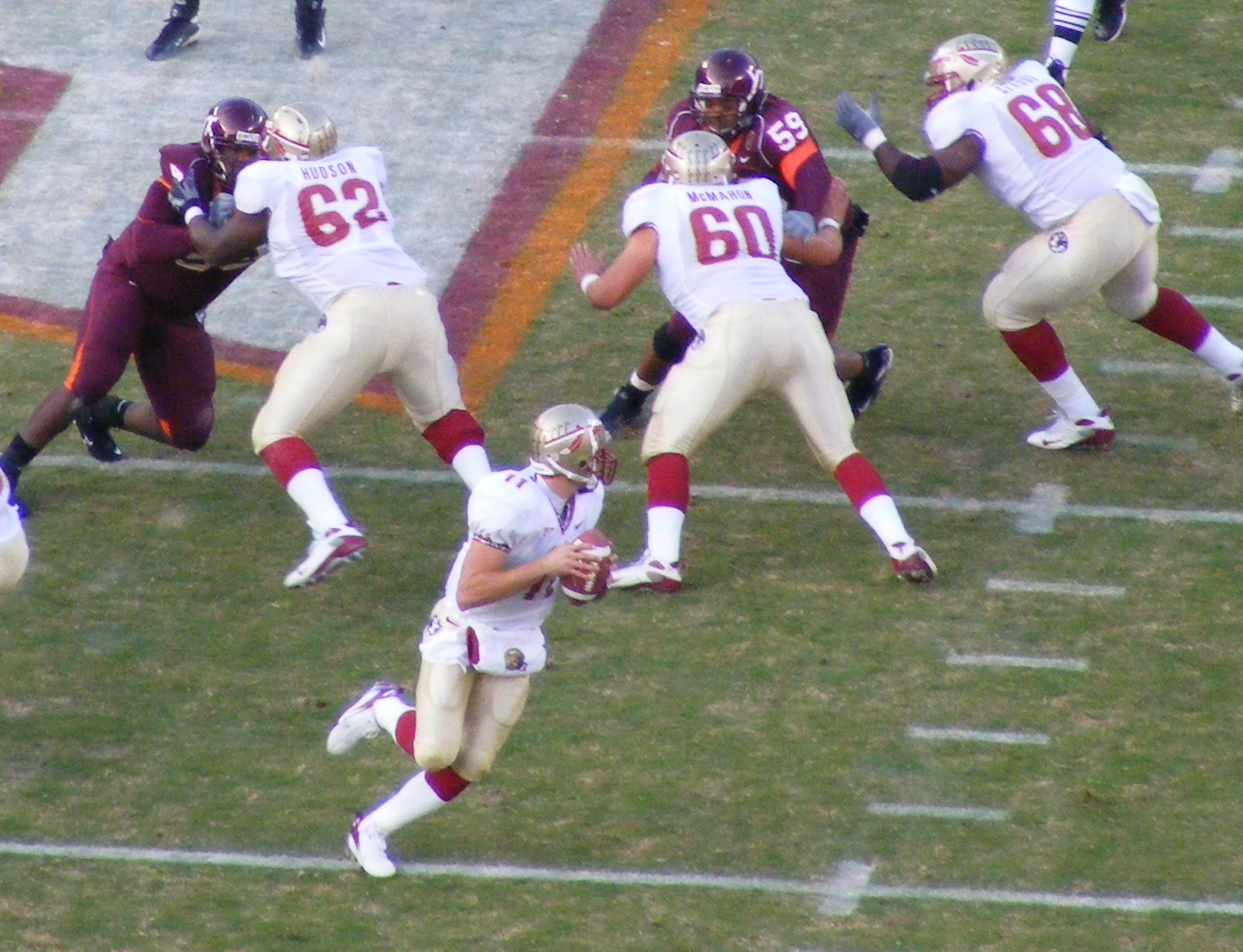
Florida State quarterback Drew Weatherford, seen here in 2007, had an excellent third quarter in the 2005 ACC Championship Game against Virginia Tech.

After the kickoff, the Hokie offense continued the lethargy that had characterized their play in the first half. Mike Imoh was stopped for no or little gain on consecutive plays before the Hokies were called for a five-yard illegal procedure penalty. On the next play, Florida State capitalized on the momentum it had gained with Reid's punt-return touchdown. Defender Pat Watkins intercepted Marcus Vick's pass, returning it to the FSU 44-yard line. Drew Weatherford and the Seminole offense, with the game's momentum in their favor, wasted no time expanding their lead. Weatherford completed a 6-yard pass, then one for 21-yards, and was aided by a 15-yard facemask penalty against Virginia Tech. Deep inside Virginia Tech territory, the third play of the drive was a 14-yard touchdown rush by Leon Washington. The speed of the drive, after a nearly scoreless first half, frustrated the Virginia Tech defense, which committed a 15-yard personal foul after the touchdown. The scoring drive had taken just three plays and 54 seconds, and gave Florida State a 17–3 lead with 10:23 remaining in the quarter.

Virginia Tech's offense fared no better on their next possession. Two plays were stopped for no gain, and the only positive play—a five-yard pass to Eddie Royal—was negated by a false start penalty. The Hokies were forced to punt the ball away to Florida State again, their fifth of the game. The punt allowed FSU to start at their own 46-yard line. At first, the Seminoles were able to capitalize on that opportunity, showing some of the effectiveness that characterized their prior drive. Lorenzo Booker ran for 24 yards on two plays, but afterwards, Drew Weatherford threw two incompletions. A false start penalty backed up the Seminoles, who were forced to punt after failing to pick up the first down. The kick allowed Florida State's special teams to be able to get downfield and stop the ball inside the Virginia Tech one-yard line, again hurting the Hokie offense.

Though hampered by the need to work inside his own end zone, Marcus Vick completed an 11-yard pass to tight end Jeff King for a first down. This play was the sole positive gain for the VT offense, however, who were forced into their sixth punt of the game. The kick traveled only 28 yards before flying out of bounds. Thanks to this kick, Weatherford was able to start his offense inside Virginia Tech territory and took advantage of the situation. On the first play Weatherford completed a 41-yard throw downfield to Willie Reid, who hauled in the ball at the Virginia Tech three-yard line to give the Seminoles a first and goal. After a failed quarterback sneak, however, Florida State was penalized 10 yards for holding and Weatherford was sacked for a loss of three yards on the next play. Although unable to cross the goal line for a touchdown, FSU did send in kicker Gary Cismesia for his second field goal attempt of the day. The kick, a 41-yarder, was good and gave Florida State a 20–3 lead with 4:23 remaining in the third quarter.

Following the kickoff, Virginia Tech's offense took the field needing to reduce Florida State's lead to allow enough time for a fourth-quarter comeback. This was not to be, however, as on the sixth play of the drive, wide receiver David Clowney fumbled the ball after catching a three-yard pass from Marcus Vick. It was recovered by Florida State's Broderick Bunkley, thus giving Florida State another chance to score from deep inside Virginia Tech territory. On the second play after the fumble, quarterback Drew Weatherford connected on a 22-yard strike to Greg Carr to drive inside the Virginia Tech 10-yard line. A five-yard facemask penalty against Virginia Tech only added to the Hokies' defensive problems. Two lays later, Weatherford capped the drive with a six-yard touchdown pass to Chris Davis, widening the Florida State lead to 27–3 with just 18 seconds remaining in the quarter.

At the end of the third quarter, any hope of victory was seemingly out of reach for Virginia Tech. Three quick plays after the kickoff resulted in a first down before time ran out, but at the end of the third quarter, Florida State still had a 27–3 lead.

=== Fourth quarter ===
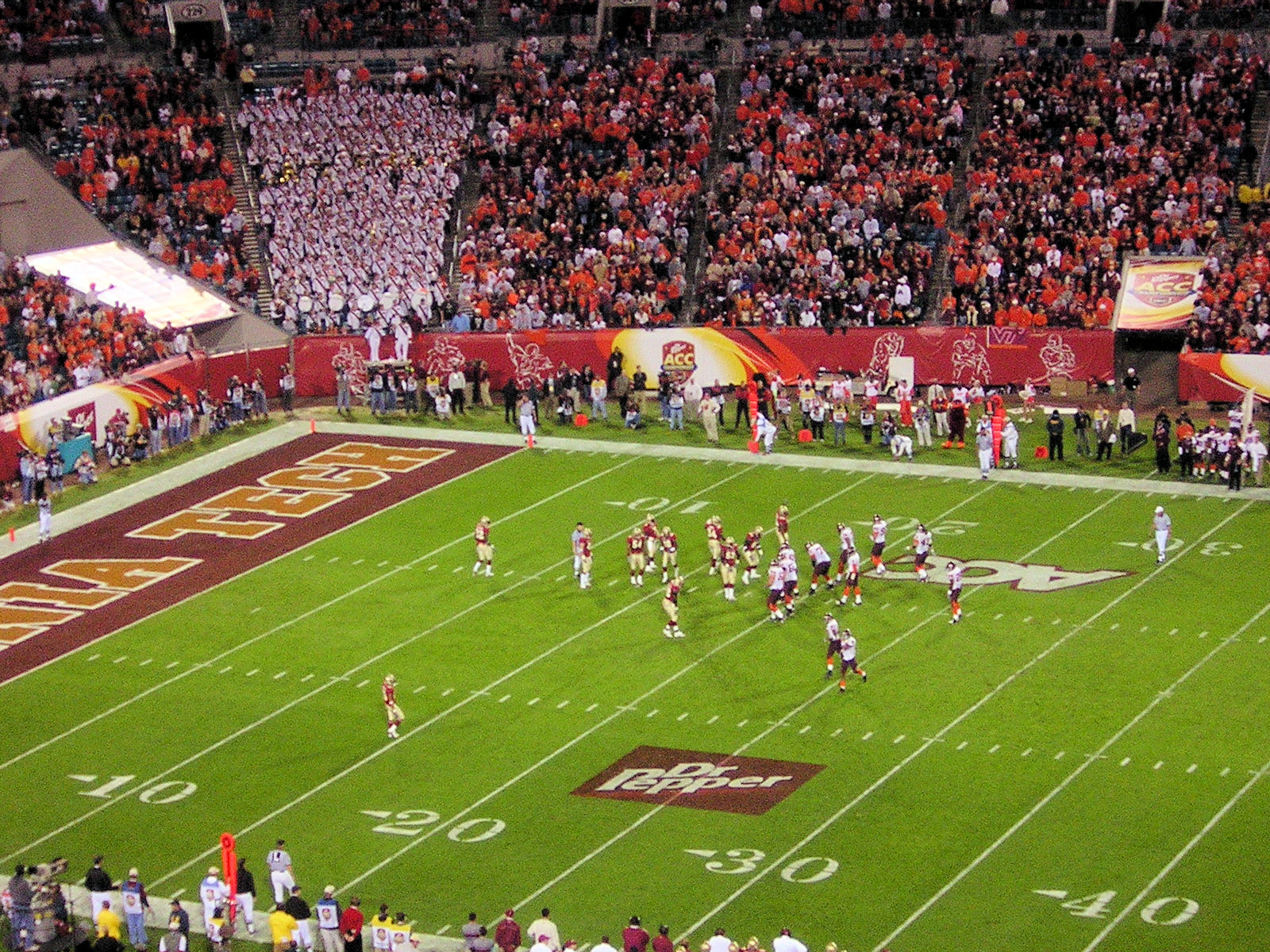
Virginia Tech, with Marcus Vick behind center, drives inside the Florida State red zone.

Virginia Tech began the fourth quarter in possession of the ball and with a first down but trailing by 24 points and virtually out of the game. The first two plays of the fourth quarter were similar to what the Tech offense had shown all game: an incomplete pass and a rush for no yards. On the third play, however, Florida State was penalized 15 yards for having too many players on the field, and Virginia Tech was awarded an automatic first down. The penalty allowed the Hokie offense to continue their drive, and Marcus Vick scrambled for 16 yards on the next play, then threw a 28-yard pass to wide receiver Josh Morgan, who broke free for a touchdown. The score was Virginia Tech's first touchdown of the game and came with 13:03 remaining in the game. Following the touchdown, the Hokies attempted a two-point conversion, but Vick's pass fell short and the conversion attempt failed. The score cut the Florida State lead to 27–9, but this was still a large margin for the amount of time remaining in the game.

Florida State received the post-score kickoff merely needing to run down the clock to secure their lead and the win. Two complete passes set up a third-and-two for Drew Weatherford, but his third-down pass fell short, stopping the clock and forcing a Florida State punt. Only a minute and a half had run off the clock, and Virginia Tech recovered the punt at their 22-yard line. On the second play after the punt, Florida State committed a pass interference penalty that gave Virginia Tech 15 automatic yards and a first down. As in the previous drive, the penalty kick-started the Virginia Tech offense. On the next play, Vick connected with Josh Morgan on a 50-yard pass—the longest offensive play of the game—that drove the Hokies to the Florida State nine-yard line. After that, a Florida State holding penalty gave Virginia Tech a first-and-goal from inside the FSU five-yard line. Marcus Vick scrambled four yards for the touchdown, and what had been a 24-point Seminole lead was now cut to 11 points. The drive had taken just 55 seconds off the clock, and it appeared that Virginia Tech still had a chance to make it a close game. As before, Virginia Tech attempted a two-point conversion, and as before, it failed. With 10:50 remaining in the game, the score was now Florida State 27, Virginia Tech 15.

Florida State began work at their 30-yard line, again needing to just run down the clock to ensure victory. As before, however, Drew Weatherford took to the air, throwing a two-yard pass. Two rushing plays followed but were stopped for little gain. Florida State again went three-and-out and had to punt. Two and a half minutes had been run off the clock, and Virginia Tech took over at their own 30-yard line after a seven-yard kick return. Unlike the two previous drives, however, Virginia Tech had almost no success on offense. A 10-yard holding penalty pushed the Hokie offense back to start the drive, and quarterback Marcus Vick was sacked for a loss to finish off the Tech possession. VT was forced to punt the ball back to Florida State, which took over at their 43-yard line with 6:21 remaining.

By this point in the game, Florida State was fully committed to running down the clock and executed three straight rushing plays to keep the time running out. Virginia Tech was forced to use two of their timeouts to stop the clock, but was eventually successful in forcing a Seminole punt. The kick rolled inside the Virginia Tech 10-yard line before being downed, pinning the Hokies deep in their territory. The first play of Tech's drive was almost a disaster for them, as Marcus Vick fumbled the ball while attempting to avoid a sack. Fortunately for the Hokies, the ball was leapt on by Tech's Duane Brown and the drive stayed alive. Virginia Tech moved the ball downfield through the air with difficulty. Due to the limited time remaining, they were forced to rely mainly on passing plays, which stopped the clock when incomplete or were completed for a first down. A 14-yard pass to Josh Morgan and a 10-yard throw to Cedric Humes moved the Hokies to their 47-yard line. Vick then completed a 19-yard pass to Jeff King and Florida State committed a 15-yard roughing the passer penalty on Marcus Vick, which was tacked onto the end of the play. After the penalty, Virginia Tech's offense was deep in Florida State territory, and two plays later, Marcus Vick ran into the end zone on a one-yard quarterback scramble. Rather than attempt another two-point conversion, the Hokies kicked the extra point, and with 1:44 remaining, Virginia Tech had closed the gap to 27–22.

In a situation with more time, Virginia Tech would have kicked the ball off to Florida State and hoped for a defensive stop to give the offense a chance for a game-winning drive. With less than two minutes remaining, however, and with Virginia Tech having used all their timeouts, the only chance for the Hokies was to attempt a difficult onside kick. A successful recovery would give the Hokies another chance on offense. Kicker Brandon Pace teed up the ball, and kicked it forwards, bouncing the ball high into the air to create a jump ball situation. Virginia Tech's Xavier Adibi recovered the ball, but because the kick had only traveled nine yards before the recovery, the ball was awarded to Florida State. NCAA rules state that an onside kick must travel at least 10 yards before the kicking team can legally touch the ball, and Pace's kick had not traveled the requisite distance.

Having recovered the ball, and with Virginia Tech having no remaining timeouts and no way to stop the clock, Florida State was able to run out the remaining time in the game and secure a 27–22 victory. Towards the end of the game, players on each team acted with hostility towards each other, and several received personal foul penalties. The penalties had no effect on the outcome of the game, and Florida State won the ACC Championship Game and an automatic bid to the 2006 Orange Bowl.

== Final statistics ==
Statistical comparison
	FSU	VT
1st downs	15	24
Total yards	272	376
Passing yards	225	335
Rushing yards	47	41
Penalties	12–114	17–143
3rd down conversions	3–13	9–20
4th down conversions	0–0	0–1
Turnovers	0	2
Time of possession	24:51	35:09

Thanks to his performance in leading Florida State to the win, FSU quarterback Drew Weatherford was named the game's Most Valuable Player. He finished the game having completed 21 of his 35 passes for 225 yards and one touchdown. Weatherford would eventually finish the season with 3,180 passing yards, the most ever recorded by a freshman quarterback in the ACC. On the opposite side of the ball, Virginia Tech quarterback Marcus Vick finished the game 26 for 52 with 335 yards, one interception, and one touchdown. Although Vick was slightly better statistically than Weatherford, and the Hokies were more statistically successful on offense thanks to Vick, the Most Valuable Player award is not usually given to a player on the losing team.

Virginia Tech turned the ball over twice—once on a fumble and once on an interception. These turnovers resulted in two touchdowns for Florida State, and the resulting 14 points were greater than Florida State's margin of victory. The Seminoles did not turn the ball over during the game. Both teams were highly penalized during the game. Virginia Tech finished with 17 penalties for 143 yards, while Florida State was penalized 12 times for 114 yards. The penalties affected each team's ability to convert third downs. Virginia Tech was able to convert only nine of 20 third-down attempts, while Florida State was successful on just three of their 13 attempts. Despite trailing for much of the game, and running a pass-heavy offense, Virginia Tech dominated the game's time of possession controlling the ball for over 35 of the game's 60 minutes.

== Post-game effects ==
Florida State's 27–22 victory over Virginia Tech secured it the 2005 ACC Championship and a bid for the Orange Bowl. The victory also had ripple effects for bowl game bids across the Atlantic Coast Conference and lasting repercussions during the football season that followed the game.

=== Bowl effects ===
Florida State (8–4) earned a BCS berth despite a record inferior to the other seven BCS teams. Regardless of that fact, the Seminoles' matchup with Penn State (10–1) in the 2006 Orange Bowl, where college football's two most successful coaches, Penn State's 78-year-old Joe Paterno and Florida State's 76-year-old Bobby Bowden, squared off.

Virginia Tech accepted a bid to the 2006 Gator Bowl, which was also played in Jacksonville, albeit a month later than the ACC Championship Game. The Gator Bowl Committee selected the Hokies over Miami due to Virginia Tech's reputation for having a large fan base that traveled well. Virginia Tech's selection bumped Miami to the 2005 Peach Bowl, while the Virginia Cavaliers were selected for the Music City Bowl and the Clemson Tigers earned a bid to the Champs Sports Bowl.

In the off-season following the ACC Championship Game, and Florida State's selection by the Orange Bowl, the Orange Bowl committee announced it would be entering into an exclusive contract with the ACC to grant the winner of the ACC Championship Game an automatic bid to the Orange Bowl unless it was ranked high enough in the Bowl Championship Series standings to play in the BCS National Championship Game.

=== Marcus Vick ===
Following the ACC Championship Game, Virginia Tech quarterback Marcus Vick stormed off the field, refusing to talk to reporters. Vick, who picked up a 15-yard unsportsmanlike conduct penalty late in the game, also earned several unsportsmanlike conduct penalties in the 2006 Gator Bowl, where post-game replays revealed that he purposefully stomped on the leg of Louisville Cardinals' defensive end Elvis Dumervil. Vick claimed he apologized to Dumervil after the game, but Dumervil stated that no apology had been made. In the wake of the incident, Virginia Tech officials announced that they would be conducting a review of Vick's conduct on and off the field.

On January 6, 2006, just a few days after that game, Virginia Tech officials dismissed Vick from the Virginia Tech football team, citing a December 17 traffic stop in which Vick was cited for speeding and driving with a revoked or suspended license. Vick had hidden the information from the team and the infraction was not discovered until January. The traffic stop, an earlier suspension from the team, and his unsportsmanlike conduct during the 2005 ACC Championship Game and 2006 Gator Bowl were used as grounds for his dismissal.

== See also ==
- List of Atlantic Coast Conference football champions
