= 2005 NC State Wolfpack football team =

American college football team season

2005 NC State Wolfpack football

Meineke Car Care Bowl champion

Meineke Car Care Bowl, W 14–0 vs. South Florida
- Conference: Atlantic Coast Conference
- Atlantic Division
- Record: 7–5 (3–5 ACC)
- Head coach: Chuck Amato (6th season)
- Offensive coordinator: Marc Trestman (1st season)
- Defensive coordinator: Steve Dunlap (1st season)
- Home stadium: Carter–Finley Stadium

2005 Atlantic Coast Conference football standings
	Conf.			Overall
Team	W		L	W		L
Atlantic Division
No. 23 Florida State xy$	5	–	3	8	–	5
No. 18 Boston College x	5	–	3	9	–	3
No. 21 Clemson	4	–	4	8	–	4
Wake Forest	3	–	5	4	–	7
NC State	3	–	5	7	–	5
Maryland	3	–	5	5	–	6
Coastal Division
No. 7 Virginia Tech x	7	–	1	11	–	2
No. 17 Miami (FL)	6	–	2	9	–	3
Georgia Tech	5	–	3	7	–	5
North Carolina	4	–	4	5	–	6
Virginia	3	–	5	7	–	5
Duke	0	–	8	1	–	10
Championship: Florida State 27, Virginia Tech 22
$ – BCS representative as conference champion; x – Division champion/co-champions; y – Championship game participant; Rankings from AP Poll

The 2005 NC State Wolfpack football team represented North Carolina State University during the 2005 NCAA Division I-A football season. The team's head coach was Chuck Amato. NC State has been a member of the Atlantic Coast Conference (ACC) since the league's inception in 1953, and participated in that conference's Atlantic Division in 2005, the inaugural year for the division. The Wolfpack played its home games in 2005 at Carter–Finley Stadium in Raleigh, North Carolina, which has been NC State football's home stadium since 1966.

== Schedule ==
Date	Time	Opponent	Site	TV	Result	Attendance
September 4	7:00 pm	No. 7 Virginia Tech	Carter–Finley Stadium; Raleigh, North Carolina	ESPN2	L 16–20	57,500
September 17	6:00 pm	Eastern Kentucky*	Carter–Finley Stadium; Raleigh, North Carolina		W 54–10	56,747
September 24	12:00 pm	North Carolina	Carter–Finley Stadium; Raleigh, North Carolina (rivalry)	JPS	L 24–31	57,500
October 6	7:30 pm	at No. 23 Georgia Tech	Bobby Dodd Stadium; Atlanta	ESPN	W 17–14	51,432
October 13	7:30 pm	Clemson	Carter–Finley Stadium; Raleigh, North Carolina (Textile Bowl)	ESPN	L 10–31	57,500
October 22	3:30 pm	at Wake Forest	Groves Stadium; Winston-Salem, North Carolina (rivalry)		L 19–27	33,316
October 29	12:00 pm	Southern Miss*^{†}	Carter–Finley Stadium; Raleigh, North Carolina	ESPNU	W 21–17	52,500
November 5	3:30 pm	at No. 8 Florida State	Doak Campbell Stadium; Tallahassee, Florida	ABC	W 20–15	83,912
November 12	7:00 pm	at No. 25 Boston College	Alumni Stadium; Chestnut Hill, Massachusetts	ESPN2	L 10–30	42,826
November 19	1:00 pm	Middle Tennessee*	Carter–Finley Stadium; Raleigh, North Carolina		W 24–3	37,217
November 26	12:00 pm	Maryland	Carter–Finley Stadium; Raleigh, North Carolina	ESPN	W 20–14	52,312
December 31	11:00 am	vs. South Florida*	Bank of America Stadium; Charlotte, North Carolina (Meineke Car Care Bowl)	ESPN2	W 14–0	57,937
*Non-conference game; ^{†}Homecoming; Rankings from Coaches' Poll released prior to the game; All times are in Eastern time
