= 2005 Boston College Eagles football team =

American college football season

2005 Boston College Eagles football
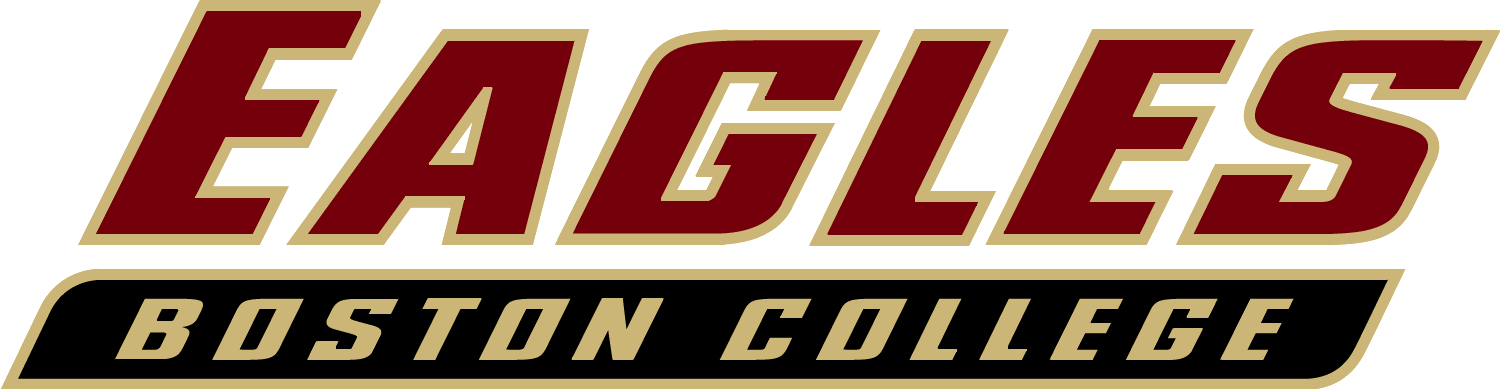

ACC Atlantic Division co-champion MPC Computers Bowl champion

MPC Computers Bowl, W 27–21 vs. Boise State
- Conference: Atlantic Coast Conference
- Atlantic Division

Ranking
- Coaches: No. 17
- AP: No. 18
- Record: 9–3 (5–3 ACC)
- Head coach: Tom O'Brien (9th season)
- Offensive coordinator: Dana Bible (7th season)
- Offensive scheme: Pro-style
- Defensive coordinator: Frank Spaziani (7th season)
- Base defense: 4–3
- Captains: Mathias Kiwanuka; Patrick Ross
- Home stadium: Alumni Stadium

2005 Atlantic Coast Conference football standings
	Conf.			Overall
Team	W		L	W		L
Atlantic Division
No. 23 Florida State xy$	5	–	3	8	–	5
No. 18 Boston College x	5	–	3	9	–	3
No. 21 Clemson	4	–	4	8	–	4
Wake Forest	3	–	5	4	–	7
NC State	3	–	5	7	–	5
Maryland	3	–	5	5	–	6
Coastal Division
No. 7 Virginia Tech x	7	–	1	11	–	2
No. 17 Miami (FL)	6	–	2	9	–	3
Georgia Tech	5	–	3	7	–	5
North Carolina	4	–	4	5	–	6
Virginia	3	–	5	7	–	5
Duke	0	–	8	1	–	10
Championship: Florida State 27, Virginia Tech 22
$ – BCS representative as conference champion; x – Division champion/co-champions; y – Championship game participant; Rankings from AP Poll

The 2005 Boston College Eagles football team represented Boston College during the 2005 NCAA Division I-A football season. Boston College was in their first year as a member of the Atlantic Coast Conference. The Eagles played their home games at Alumni Stadium in Chestnut Hill, Massachusetts, which has been their home stadium since 1957.

== Schedule ==
Date	Time	Opponent	Rank	Site	TV	Result	Attendance
September 3	3:30 p.m.	at BYU*	No. 22	LaVell Edwards Stadium; Provo, UT	ABC	W 20–3	58,108
September 10	12:30 p.m.	Army*	No. 19	Alumni Stadium; Chestnut Hill, MA	ESPN Classic	W 44–7	40,166
September 17	7:45 p.m.	No. 8 Florida State	No. 17	Alumni Stadium; Chestnut Hill, MA (College GameDay)	ESPN	L 17–28	44,500
September 24	12:00 p.m.	at Clemson		Memorial Stadium; Clemson, SC (rivalry)	JPS	W 16–13 ^{OT}	77,684
October 1	1:00 p.m.	Ball State*	No. 21	Alumni Stadium; Chestnut Hill, MA		W 38–0	40,162
October 8	1:00 p.m.	Virginia	No. 18	Alumni Stadium; Chestnut Hill, MA	ABC	W 28–17	35,286
October 15	12:00 p.m.	Wake Forest	No. 14	Alumni Stadium; Chestnut Hill, MA	JPS	W 35–30	33,632
October 27	7:45 p.m.	at No. 3 Virginia Tech	No. 13	Lane Stadium; Blacksburg, VA (rivalry)	ESPN	L 10–30	65,115
November 5	12:00 p.m.	at North Carolina	No. 19	Kenan Memorial Stadium; Chapel Hill, NC	JPS	L 14–16	48,000
November 12	7:00 p.m.	NC State		Alumni Stadium; Chestnut Hill, MA	ESPN2	W 30–10	42,826
November 19	12:00 p.m.	at Maryland	No. 23	Byrd Stadium; College Park, MD	JPS	W 31–16	51,585
December 28	4:30 p.m.	vs. Boise State*	No. 19	Bronco Stadium; Boise, ID (MPC Computers Bowl)	ESPN	W 27–21	30,493
*Non-conference game; Rankings from AP Poll released prior to the game; All times are in Eastern time

== Rankings ==
Ranking movements Legend: ██ Increase in ranking ██ Decrease in ranking — = Not ranked RV = Received votes
	Week															
Poll	Pre	1	2	3	4	5	6	7	8	9	10	11	12	13	14	Final
AP	22	19	17	RV	21	18	14	13	13	19	RV	23	21	19	19	18
Coaches	22	18	16	25	23	17	14	11	11	19	25	23	20	19	19	17
Harris	Not released				21	18	14	13	12	20	RV	23	20	19	19	Not released
BCS	Not released							12	14	19	—	24	18	20	21	Not released

== Drafted Players (2006 NFL Draft) ==
2006	1	32	32	Mathias Kiwanuka	New York Giants	DE
2006	2	27	59	Jeremy Trueblood	Tampa Bay Buccaneers	T
2006	4	18	115	Will Blackmon	Green Bay Packers	DB
