= Steven Jackson (fullback) =

American football player (born 1984)

Profile
- Position: Fullback

Personal information
- Born: May 11, 1984 (age 42); Columbia, South Carolina, U.S.
- Listed height: 6 ft 2 in (1.88 m)
- Listed weight: 246 lb (112 kg)

Career information
- College: Clemson
- NFL draft: 2006: undrafted

Career history
- Minnesota Vikings (2006)*; Carolina Panthers (2006); Denver Broncos (2008)*; Kansas City Chiefs (2008)*
- * Offseason or practice squad member only

Steven Jackson (born May 11, 1984) is an American former football fullback. He was signed by the Minnesota Vikings as an undrafted free agent in 2006. He played college football at East Tennessee State University and Clemson University.

Jackson was also a member of the Carolina Panthers, Denver Broncos and Kansas City Chiefs.

== College career ==
Jackson played defensive tackle, earning freshman all-conference honors at East Tennessee State University before transferring to Clemson University.

== Professional career ==
Jackson was promoted to the Panthers' active roster on December 20, 2006.
