= 2005 Virginia Cavaliers football team =

American college football season

2005 Virginia Cavaliers football

Music City Bowl champion

Music City Bowl, W 34–31 vs. Minnesota
- Conference: Atlantic Coast Conference
- Coastal Division
- Record: 7–5 (3–5 ACC)
- Head coach: Al Groh (5th season)
- Offensive coordinator: Ron Prince (3rd season)
- Defensive coordinator: Al Golden (5th season)
- Home stadium: Scott Stadium

2005 Atlantic Coast Conference football standings
	Conf.			Overall
Team	W		L	W		L
Atlantic Division
No. 23 Florida State xy$	5	–	3	8	–	5
No. 18 Boston College x	5	–	3	9	–	3
No. 21 Clemson	4	–	4	8	–	4
Wake Forest	3	–	5	4	–	7
NC State	3	–	5	7	–	5
Maryland	3	–	5	5	–	6
Coastal Division
No. 7 Virginia Tech x	7	–	1	11	–	2
No. 17 Miami (FL)	6	–	2	9	–	3
Georgia Tech	5	–	3	7	–	5
North Carolina	4	–	4	5	–	6
Virginia	3	–	5	7	–	5
Duke	0	–	8	1	–	10
Championship: Florida State 27, Virginia Tech 22
$ – BCS representative as conference champion; x – Division champion/co-champions; y – Championship game participant; Rankings from AP Poll

The 2005 Virginia Cavaliers football team represented the University of Virginia as a member of the Coastal Division in the Atlantic Coast Conference (ACC) during the 2005 NCAA Division I-A football season. Led by fifth-year head coach Al Groh, the Cavaliers compiled an overall record of 7–5 with a mark of 3–5 in conference play, placing fifth in the ACC's Coastal Division. Virginia was invited to the Music City Bowl, where the Cavaliers defeated Minnesota. The team played home games at Scott Stadium in Charlottesville, Virginia.

== Schedule ==
Date	Time	Opponent	Rank	Site	TV	Result	Attendance
September 3	6:30 pm	Western Michigan*	No. 25	Scott Stadium; Charlottesville, VA	ESPN360	W 31–19	61,244
September 17	12:00 pm	at Syracuse*	No. 25	Carrier Dome; Syracuse, NY	ESPN2	W 27–24	40,027
September 24	3:30 pm	Duke	No. 23	Scott Stadium; Charlottesville, VA	ESPN360	W 38–7	61,021
October 1	12:00 pm	at Maryland	No. 19	Byrd Stadium; College Park, MD (rivalry)	JPS	L 33–45	52,656
October 8	1:00 pm	at No. 18 Boston College		Alumni Stadium; Chestnut Hill, MA	ABC	L 17–28	35,286
October 15	8:00 pm	No. 4 Florida State^{†}		Scott Stadium; Charlottesville, VA (Jefferson–Eppes Trophy)	ESPN	W 26–21	63,106
October 22	12:00 pm	at North Carolina	No. 24	Kenan Memorial Stadium; Chapel Hill, NC (South's Oldest Rivalry)	JPS	L 5–7	52,000
November 5	3:30 pm	Temple*		Scott Stadium; Charlottesville, VA		W 51–3	57,060
November 12	3:30 pm	No. 24 Georgia Tech		Scott Stadium; Charlottesville, VA	ABC	W 27–17	60,061
November 19	12:00 pm	No. 7 Virginia Tech		Scott Stadium; Charlottesville, VA (rivalry)	ESPN	L 14–52	63,344
November 26	3:30 pm	at No. 10 Miami		Miami Orange Bowl; Miami, FL	ABC	L 17–25	37,629
December 30	12:00 pm	vs. Minnesota*		LP Field; Nashville, TN (Music City Bowl)	ESPN	W 34–31	40,519
*Non-conference game; ^{†}Homecoming; Rankings from AP Poll released prior to the game; All times are in Eastern time

== Roster ==
2005 Virginia Cavaliers football team roster
Players
Coaches
Offense

Pos.	#	Name	Class
QB	11	Christian Olsen	Jr
QB	13	Kevin McCabe	So
QB	18	Marques Hagans	Sr
OT	69	Brad Butler	Sr
OL	77	Ian-Yates Cunningham	So
G	79	Gordie Sammis	Jr

Defense

Pos.	#	Name	Class

Special teams

Pos.	#	Name	Class

Head coach

- Al Groh

Coordinators/assistant coaches

- Chad Wilt (Graduate assistant)

Legend

- (C) Team captain
- (S) Suspended
- (I) Ineligible
- Injured
- Redshirt

Roster
