= Justin Mincey =

American gridiron football player (born 1986)

No. 99
- Position: Defensive line

Personal information
- Born: March 5, 1986 (age 40); Folkston, Georgia, U.S.
- Listed height: 6 ft 5 in (1.96 m)
- Listed weight: 268 lb (122 kg)

Career information
- High school: Charlton County (Folkston, Georgia)
- College: Florida State
- NFL draft: 2010: undrafted

Career history
- Hamilton Tiger-Cats (2011)*; Iowa Barnstormers (2012)
- * Offseason or practice squad member only

Career AFL statistics
- Total tackles: 16.5
- Sacks: 2
- Forced fumbles: 0
- Stats at ArenaFan.com

Justin Mincey (born March 5, 1986) is an American former football player. He played for the Iowa Barnstormers of the Arena Football League
