= Tommy Davis (defensive end) =

American football player (born 1982)

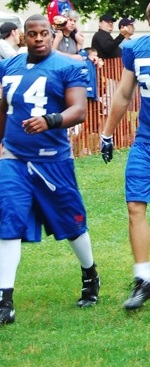
- Davis at New York Giants training camp in 2007

Personal information
- Born: October 18, 1982; Goldsboro, North Carolina, U.S.
- Died: 4 June 2020 (aged 37)
- Listed height: 6 ft 3 in (1.91 m)
- Listed weight: 257 lb (117 kg)

Career information
- High school: Dudley (NC) Southern Wayne
- College: North Carolina
- NFL draft: 2006: undrafted

Career history

Playing
- New Orleans Saints (2006)*; New York Giants (2006–2007)*; Washington Redskins (2007–2008)*
- * Offseason or practice squad member only

Coaching
- North Carolina (2011–2012) Graduate assistant; Saint Joseph's (IN) (2013) Defensive line coach

Tommy Love Davis (born October 18, 1982) is an American former professional football defensive end. He was a defensive graduate assistant at North Carolina Tar Heels football. He was signed by the New Orleans Saints as an undrafted free agent in 2006. He played college football at North Carolina.

== College career ==
Davis played college football at North Carolina from 2002 to 2005.

== Professional career ==
Davis was a member of the New York Giants and Washington Redskins after he was signed by the New Orleans Saints as an undrafted free agent in 2006.

In 2011, Davis joined the UNC Chapel Hill football coaching staff as a defensive graduate assistant.
