= Bryon Bishop =

American football player (born 1986)

Profile
- Position: Offensive lineman

Personal information
- Born: May 24, 1986 (age 40); Union, South Carolina, U.S.
- Listed height: 6 ft 5 in (1.96 m)
- Listed weight: 320 lb (145 kg)

Career information
- College: North Carolina
- NFL draft: 2010: undrafted

Career history
- Orlando Predators (2010); Jacksonville Sharks (2011); Orlando Predators (2013)

Career AFL statistics
- Tackles: 1
- Stats at ArenaFan.com

Bryon Bishop (born May 24, 1986) is an American former football offensive lineman. He played on the offensive line for the University of North Carolina. He was signed as a free agent by the Orlando Predators in 2011.
