= 2005 Georgia Tech Yellow Jackets football team =

American college football season

2005 Georgia Tech Yellow Jackets football

Emerald Bowl, L 10–38 vs. Utah
- Conference: Atlantic Coast Conference
- Coastal
- Record: 7–5 (5–3 ACC)
- Head coach: Chan Gailey (4th season)
- Offensive coordinator: Patrick Nix (4th season)
- Offensive scheme: Mixed Shotgun & Ace
- Defensive coordinator: Jon Tenuta (4th season)
- Base defense: Zone Blitz
- Home stadium: Bobby Dodd Stadium

2005 Atlantic Coast Conference football standings
	Conf.			Overall
Team	W		L	W		L
Atlantic Division
No. 23 Florida State xy$	5	–	3	8	–	5
No. 18 Boston College x	5	–	3	9	–	3
No. 21 Clemson	4	–	4	8	–	4
Wake Forest	3	–	5	4	–	7
NC State	3	–	5	7	–	5
Maryland	3	–	5	5	–	6
Coastal Division
No. 7 Virginia Tech x	7	–	1	11	–	2
No. 17 Miami (FL)	6	–	2	9	–	3
Georgia Tech	5	–	3	7	–	5
North Carolina	4	–	4	5	–	6
Virginia	3	–	5	7	–	5
Duke	0	–	8	1	–	10
Championship: Florida State 27, Virginia Tech 22
$ – BCS representative as conference champion; x – Division champion/co-champions; y – Championship game participant; Rankings from AP Poll

The 2005 Georgia Tech Yellow Jackets football team represented the Georgia Institute of Technology in the 2005 NCAA Division I-A football season. The team's head coach was Chan Gailey. It played its home games at Bobby Dodd Stadium in Atlanta.

== Schedule ==
Date	Time	Opponent	Rank	Site	TV	Result	Attendance
September 3	8:45 pm	at No. 16 Auburn*		Jordan–Hare Stadium; Auburn, Alabama	ESPN	W 23–14	87,451
September 10	3:30 pm	North Carolina	No. 17	Bobby Dodd Stadium; Atlanta	ABC	W 27–21	46,459
September 17	6:45 pm	Connecticut*	No. 16	Bobby Dodd Stadium; Atlanta, Georgia	ESPNU	W 28–13	48,770
September 24	3:30 pm	at No. 4 Virginia Tech	No. 15	Lane Stadium; Blacksburg, Virginia (Battle of the Techs) (College GameDay)	ABC	L 7–51	65,115
October 6	7:30 pm	NC State	No. 24	Bobby Dodd Stadium; Atlanta	ESPN	L 14–17	51,432
October 15	3:30 pm	at Duke		Wallace Wade Stadium; Durham, North Carolina	ESPNU	W 35–10	17,451
October 29	3:30 pm	Clemson^{†}		Bobby Dodd Stadium; Atlanta	ESPN	W 10–9	55,000
November 5	1:30 pm	Wake Forest		Bobby Dodd Stadium; Atlanta		W 30–17	51,571
November 12	3:30 pm	at Virginia	No. 24	Scott Stadium; Charlottesville, Virginia	ABC	L 17–27	60,061
November 19	7:45 pm	at No. 3 Miami (FL)		Miami Orange Bowl; Miami	ESPN	W 14–10	53,764
November 26	8:00 pm	No. 13 Georgia*	No. 20	Bobby Dodd Stadium; Atlanta (Clean, Old-Fashioned Hate)	ABC	L 7–14	56,412
December 29	4:30 pm	vs. Utah*	No. 24	SBC Park; San Francisco (Emerald Bowl)	ESPN	L 10–38	25,742
*Non-conference game; ^{†}Homecoming; Rankings from AP Poll released prior to the game; All times are in Eastern time

== Coaching staff ==
- Chan Gailey – Head Coach
- Joe D'Alessandris – Offensive Line
- Buddy Geis – Wide Receivers/Assistant Head Coach
- Brian Jean-Mary – Linebackers
- Curtis Modkins – Running Backs
- Patrick Nix – Offensive Coordinator/Quarterbacks
- Tommie Robinson – Tight Ends
- Giff Smith – Defensive Line
- Jon Tenuta – Defensive Coordinator/Defensive Backs
- David Wilson – Special Teams/Recruiting Coordinator
