= 2005 Florida State Seminoles football team =

American college football season

2005 Florida State Seminoles football

ACC champion ACC Atlantic Division co-champion

ACC Championship Game, W 27–22 vs. Virginia Tech

Orange Bowl, L 23–26 ^{3OT} vs. Penn State
- Conference: Atlantic Coast Conference
- Atlantic Division

Ranking
- Coaches: No. 23
- AP: No. 23
- Record: 8–5 (5–3 ACC)
- Head coach: Bobby Bowden (30th season)
- Offensive coordinator: Jeff Bowden (5th season)
- Offensive scheme: Pro-style
- Defensive coordinator: Mickey Andrews (22nd season)
- Base defense: 4–3
- Captains: Brodrick Bunkley; Willie Reid; Kyler Hall
- Home stadium: Doak Campbell Stadium

2005 Atlantic Coast Conference football standings
	Conf.			Overall
Team	W		L	W		L
Atlantic Division
No. 23 Florida State xy$	5	–	3	8	–	5
No. 18 Boston College x	5	–	3	9	–	3
No. 21 Clemson	4	–	4	8	–	4
Wake Forest	3	–	5	4	–	7
NC State	3	–	5	7	–	5
Maryland	3	–	5	5	–	6
Coastal Division
No. 7 Virginia Tech x	7	–	1	11	–	2
No. 17 Miami (FL)	6	–	2	9	–	3
Georgia Tech	5	–	3	7	–	5
North Carolina	4	–	4	5	–	6
Virginia	3	–	5	7	–	5
Duke	0	–	8	1	–	10
Championship: Florida State 27, Virginia Tech 22
$ – BCS representative as conference champion; x – Division champion/co-champions; y – Championship game participant; Rankings from AP Poll

The 2005 Florida State Seminoles football team represented the Florida State University as a member of the Atlantic Coast Conference (ACC) during the 2005 NCAA Division I-A football season. Led by 30th-year head coach Bobby Bowden, the Seminoles compiled an overall record of 8–5 with a mark of 5–3 in conference play, sharing the ACC's Atlantic Division title with Boston College. Florida State advanced to the inaugural ACC Championship Game, where the Seminoles defeated Virginia Tech to win the conference title. They concluded the season with a triple-overtime loss to Penn State in the Orange Bowl. The team played home games at Doak Campbell Stadium in Tallahassee, Florida.

Florida State finished the season ranked No. 23 in both the final AP poll and the Coaches Poll. The Seminoles' trip to the Orange Bowl marked the 24th consecutive bowl game appearance under Bowden.

== Schedule ==
Date	Time	Opponent	Rank	Site	TV	Result	Attendance	Source
September 5	8:00 p.m.	No. 9 Miami (FL)	No. 14	Doak Campbell Stadium; Tallahassee, FL (rivalry)	ABC	W 10–7	84,347	
September 10	6:45 p.m.	The Citadel*	No. 11	Doak Campbell Stadium; Tallahassee, FL	ESPNU	W 62–10	79,152	
September 17	7:45 p.m.	at No. 17 Boston College	No. 8	Alumni Stadium; Chestnut Hill, MA (College GameDay)	ESPN	W 28–17	44,500	
October 1	3:30 p.m.	Syracuse*	No. 6	Doak Campbell Stadium; Tallahassee, FL	ABC	W 38–14	83,717	
October 8	12:00 p.m.	Wake Forest	No. 4	Doak Campbell Stadium; Tallahassee, FL	JPS	W 41–24	82,589	
October 15	7:45 p.m.	at Virginia	No. 4	Scott Stadium; Charlottesville, VA (Jefferson–Eppes Trophy)	ESPN	L 21–26	63,106	
October 22	3:30 p.m.	at Duke	No. 11	Wallace Wade Stadium; Durham, NC	ESPNU	W 55–24	21,731	
October 29	3:30 p.m.	Maryland^{†}	No. 10	Doak Campbell Stadium; Tallahassee, FL	ABC	W 35–27	82,626	
November 5	3:30 p.m.	NC State	No. 9	Doak Campbell Stadium; Tallahassee, FL	ABC	L 15–20	83,912	
November 12	12:00 p.m.	at Clemson	No. 17	Memorial Stadium; Clemson, SC (rivalry)	ESPN	L 14–35	80,536	
November 26	3:30 p.m.	at No. 19 Florida*	No. 23	Ben Hill Griffin Stadium; Gainesville, FL (rivalry)	CBS	L 7–34	90,669	
December 3	7:45 p.m.	vs. No. 5 Virginia Tech		Alltel Stadium; Jacksonville, FL (ACC Championship Game)	ABC	W 27–22	72,749	
January 3	8:00 p.m.	vs. No. 3 Penn State*	No. 22	Dolphins Stadium; Miami Gardens, FL (Orange Bowl)	ABC	L 23–26 ^{3OT}	77,773	
*Non-conference game; ^{†}Homecoming; Rankings from AP Poll released prior to the game; All times are in Eastern time

== Rankings ==
Ranking movements Legend: ██ Increase in ranking ██ Decrease in ranking — = Not ranked RV = Received votes
	Week															
Poll	Pre	1	2	3	4	5	6	7	8	9	10	11	12	13	14	Final
AP	14	11	8	6	6	4	4	11	10	9	17	22	23	RV	22	23
Coaches	12	11	8	7	7	5	5	10	9	8	16	22	21	RV	22	23
Harris	Not released				6	4	5	10	9	8	16	21	21	RV	22	Not released
BCS	Not released							11	10	9	19	—	24	—	22	Not released

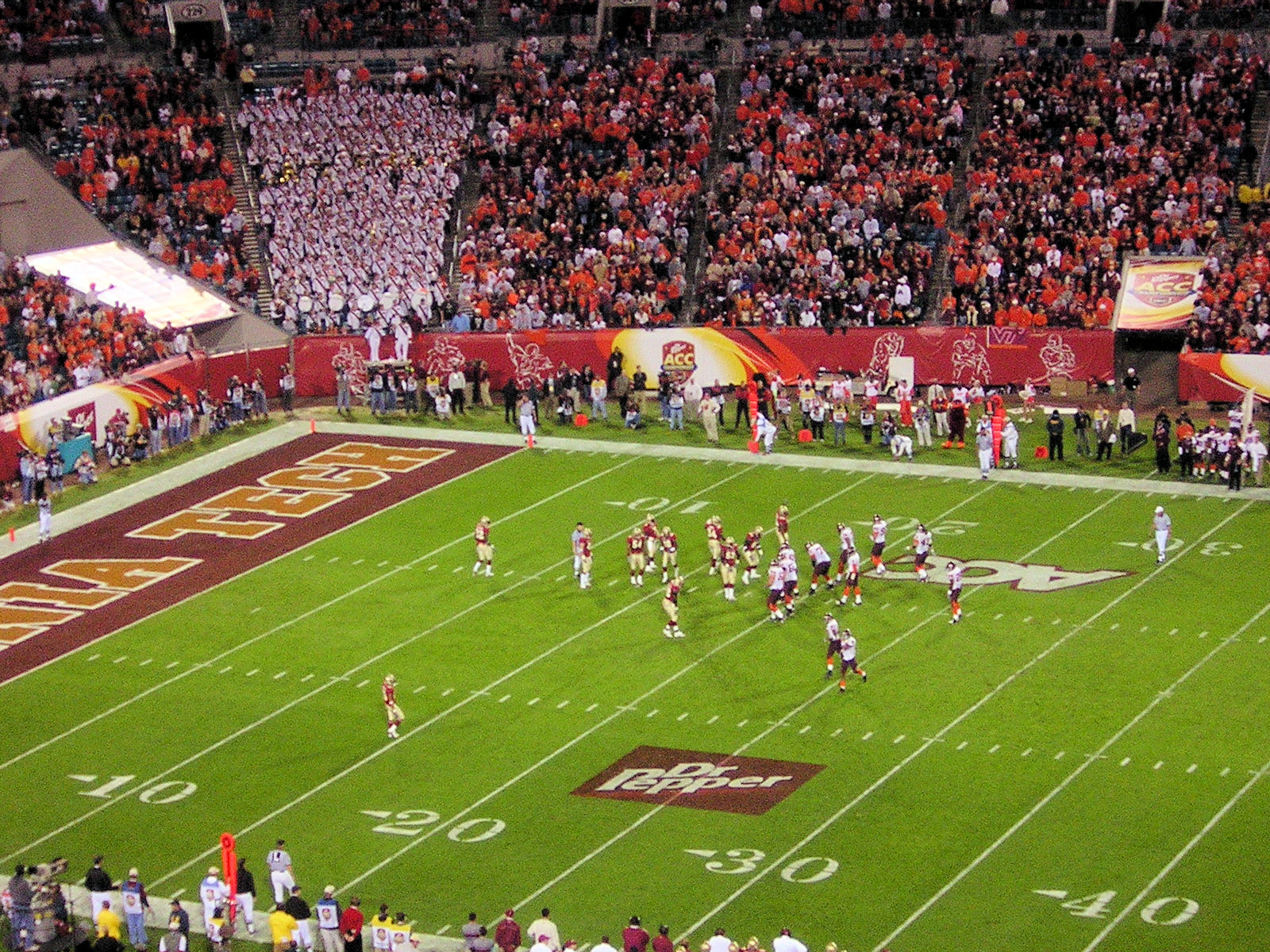
Florida State appeared in the first ACC title game.

== Personnel ==
=== Recruits ===
The Seminoles recruiting class was ranked No. 2 in the nation behind only USC by Rivals.com,. On a reevaluation in 2012, Rivals.com listed it among the most disappointing recruiting classes of the decade.

College recruiting information
Name	Hometown	School	Height	Weight	40^{‡}	Commit date
Russell Ball; RB	La Marque, Texas	La Marque HS	5 ft 9 in (1.75 m)	165 lb (75 kg)	4.3	May 23, 2004
Russell Ball; RB	Recruit ratings: Scout: Rivals: (N/A)					
Callahan Bright; DT	Bryn Mawr, Pennsylvania	Harriton Senior HS	6 ft 2 in (1.88 m)	315 lb (143 kg)	5.0	Feb 2, 2005
Callahan Bright; DT	Recruit ratings: Scout: Rivals: (N/A)					
Everette Brown; DE	Wilson, North Carolina	Beddingfield HS	6 ft 4 in (1.93 m)	235 lb (107 kg)	4.5	Jan 5, 2005
Everette Brown; DE	Recruit ratings: Scout: Rivals: (N/A)					
Matt Dunham; ATH	Columbus, Georgia	St. Anne-Pacelli Catholic	6 ft 2 in (1.88 m)	230 lb (100 kg)	4.4	Apr 26, 2004
Matt Dunham; ATH	Recruit ratings: Scout: Rivals: (N/A)					
Dan Foster; LB	Blakely, Georgia	Early County HS	6 ft 1 in (1.85 m)	215 lb (98 kg)	4.5	Nov 3, 2004
Dan Foster; LB	Recruit ratings: Scout: Rivals: (N/A)					
Graham Gano; K	Cantonment, Florida	Tate HS	6 ft 1 in (1.85 m)	180 lb (82 kg)	4.4	Nov 3, 2004
Graham Gano; K	Recruit ratings: Scout: Rivals: (N/A)					
Michael Ray Garvin; DB	Ramsey, New Jersey	Don Bosco Preparatory	5 ft 9 in (1.75 m)	180 lb (82 kg)	4.3	Dec 6, 2004
Michael Ray Garvin; DB	Recruit ratings: Scout: Rivals: (N/A)					
Richard Goodman; WR	Ft. Lauderdale, Florida	St. Thomas Aquinas HS	6 ft 0 in (1.83 m)	175 lb (79 kg)	4.5	Jan 31, 2005
Richard Goodman; WR	Recruit ratings: Scout: Rivals: (N/A)					
Charlie Graham; TE	Greenville, Florida	Madison County HS	6 ft 2 in (1.88 m)	230 lb (100 kg)	4.8	Dec 17, 2004
Charlie Graham; TE	Recruit ratings: Scout: Rivals: (N/A)					
Letroy Guion; DT	Starke, Florida	Bradford HS	6 ft 4 in (1.93 m)	282 lb (128 kg)	4.7	Jun 10, 2005
Letroy Guion; DT	Recruit ratings: Scout: Rivals: (N/A)					
Jonathan Hannah; TE	Louisburg, North Carolina	Louisburg HS	6 ft 4 in (1.93 m)	260 lb (120 kg)	4.8	Feb 8, 2005
Jonathan Hannah; TE	Recruit ratings: Scout: Rivals: (40)					
Matt Hardrick; OL	Orlando, Florida	Edgewater	6 ft 5 in (1.96 m)	340 lb (150 kg)	5.5	Feb 3, 2005
Matt Hardrick; OL	Recruit ratings: Scout: Rivals: (N/A)					
Geno Hayes; LB	Greenville, Florida	Madison County HS	6 ft 2 in (1.88 m)	212 lb (96 kg)	4.65	Feb 2, 2005
Geno Hayes; LB	Recruit ratings: Scout: Rivals: (N/A)					
Anthony Kelly; LB	Ellisville, Mississippi	Jones County Junior College	6 ft 3 in (1.91 m)	230 lb (100 kg)	4.6	Feb 17, 2004
Anthony Kelly; LB	Recruit ratings: Scout: Rivals: (N/A)					
Korey Mangum; DB	La Marque, Texas	La Marque HS	5 ft 11 in (1.80 m)	180 lb (82 kg)	4.5	Feb 1, 2005
Korey Mangum; DB	Recruit ratings: Scout: Rivals: (N/A)					
Justin Mincey; DE	Folkston, Georgia	Charlton County HS	6 ft 5 in (1.96 m)	240 lb (110 kg)	4.7	Dec 5, 2004
Justin Mincey; DE	Recruit ratings: Scout: Rivals: (N/A)					
Neefy Moffett; LB	Palm Bay, Florida	Palm Bay Senior HS	6 ft 1 in (1.85 m)	215 lb (98 kg)	4.5	Feb 2, 2005
Neefy Moffett; LB	Recruit ratings: Scout: Rivals: (N/A)					
Derek Nicholson; LB	Winston-Salem, North Carolina	Mount Tabor HS	6 ft 0 in (1.83 m)	220 lb (100 kg)	4.6	Jan 31, 2005
Derek Nicholson; LB	Recruit ratings: Scout: Rivals: (N/A)					
Rod Owens; WR	Jacksonville, Florida	Samuel W. Wolfson HS	6 ft 0 in (1.83 m)	170 lb (77 kg)	4.4	Jan 9, 2005
Rod Owens; WR	Recruit ratings: Scout: Rivals: (N/A)					
Jamie Robinson; DB	Rock Hill, South Carolina	Northwestern HS	6 ft 2 in (1.88 m)	185 lb (84 kg)	4.5	Feb 1, 2005
Jamie Robinson; DB	Recruit ratings: Scout: Rivals: (N/A)					
Fred Rouse; WR	Tallahassee, Florida	Lincoln HS	6 ft 4 in (1.93 m)	190 lb (86 kg)	4.4	Feb 2, 2005
Fred Rouse; WR	Recruit ratings: Scout: Rivals: (N/A)					
Antone Smith; RB	Pahokee, Florida	Pahokee HS	5 ft 8 in (1.73 m)	183 lb (83 kg)	4.3	Feb 2, 2005
Antone Smith; RB	Recruit ratings: Scout: Rivals: (N/A)					
Kendrick Stewart; DT	Lakeland, Florida	Lakeland Senior HS	6 ft 1 in (1.85 m)	275 lb (125 kg)	4.8	Jan 6, 2005
Kendrick Stewart; DT	Recruit ratings: Scout: Rivals: (N/A)					
Clarence Ward; DB	Pensacola, Florida	Pensacola HS	6 ft 0 in (1.83 m)	175 lb (79 kg)	4.5	Jan 25, 2005
Clarence Ward; DB	Recruit ratings: Scout: Rivals: (N/A)					
Overall recruit ranking:
‡ Refers to 40-yard dash; Note: In many cases, Scout, Rivals, 247Sports, On3, and ESPN may conflict in their listings of height, weight and 40 time.; In these cases, the average was taken. ESPN grades are on a 100-point scale.; Sources: "Florida State 2005 Football Commitments". Rivals.; "2005 Florida State Commits". Scout.; "2005 Player Commitments – Florida State". ESPN.; "Scout.com Team Recruiting Rankings". Scout.; "2005 Team Ranking". Rivals.com.

== After the season ==
=== All-star games ===
Game	Date	Site	Players
57th Senior Bowl	January 28, 2006	Ladd–Peebles Stadium, Mobile, Alabama	Pat Watkins, Brodrick Bunkley, Kamerion Wimbley

=== NFL draft ===
Six seniors and two juniors were selected in the 2006 NFL draft.

Round	Pick	Overall	Name	Position	Team
1st	9	9	Ernie Sims	Linebacker	Detroit Lions
1st	13	13	Kamerion Wimbley	Defensive end	Cleveland Browns
1st	14	14	Brodrick Bunkley	Defensive tackle	Philadelphia Eagles
1st	19	19	Antonio Cromartie	Cornerback	San Diego Chargers
3rd	31	95	Willie Reid	Wide receiver	Pittsburgh Steelers
4th	20	117	Leon Washington	Running back	New York Jets
5th	5	138	Pat Watkins	Safety	Dallas Cowboys
5th	24	157	A. J. Nicholson	Linebacker	Cincinnati Bengals
