= List of College GameDay (football TV program) locations =

This is a list of locations from which ESPN's College GameDay has been broadcast since it first went on the road in 1993.

== 1993 season ==
| Date | Visiting team | | Home team | | City | Location | Notes | Lee Corso pick |
|---|---|---|---|---|---|---|---|---|
| November 13 | 1 Florida State | 24 | 2 Notre Dame | 31 | South Bend, Indiana | Joyce Center | Game of the Century | Florida State (Note: Corso wore the Florida State hat, then wore the Notre Dame hat. He eventually chose Florida State.) |

== 1994 season ==
| Date | Visiting team | | Home team | | City | Location | Notes | Lee Corso pick |
|---|---|---|---|---|---|---|---|---|
| September 10 | 6 Michigan | 26 | 3 Notre Dame | 24 | South Bend, Indiana | | Rivalry | |
| September 17 | 13 UCLA | 21 | 2 Nebraska | 49 | Lincoln, Nebraska | | | |
| October 8 | 3 Florida State | 20 | 13 Miami (FL) | 34 | Miami, Florida | Miami Orange Bowl | Rivalry | |
| October 15 | 3 Penn State | 31 | 5 Michigan | 24 | Ann Arbor, Michigan | | Rivalry | |
| October 29 | 4 Colorado | 7 | 2 Nebraska | 24 | Lincoln, Nebraska | | Rivalry | Colorado |
| November 19 | 6 Auburn | 14 | 4 Alabama | 21 | Birmingham, Alabama | Legion Field | Iron Bowl | |

== 1995 season ==
| Date | Visiting team | | Home team | | City | Location | Notes | Lee Corso pick |
|---|---|---|---|---|---|---|---|---|
| September 9 | Georgia | 27 | 8 Tennessee | 30 | Knoxville, Tennessee | | Rivalry | |
| September 23 | 3 Texas A&M | 21 | 7 Colorado | 29 | Boulder, Colorado | | | |
| September 30 | 4 Colorado | 38 | 10 Oklahoma | 17 | Norman, Oklahoma | | | |
| October 7 | Miami (FL) | 17 | 1 Florida State | 41 | Tallahassee, Florida | Outside Doak Campbell Stadium | Rivalry | |
| October 14 | 6 Tennessee | 41 | 12 Alabama | 14 | Birmingham, Alabama | Legion Field | Third Saturday in October | |
| October 21 | 5 USC | 10 | 17 Notre Dame | 38 | South Bend, Indiana | | Rivalry | |
| October 28 | 2 Nebraska | 44 | 7 Colorado | 21 | Boulder, Colorado | | Rivalry | Nebraska |
| November 11 | Iowa | 20 | 5 Northwestern | 31 | Evanston, Illinois | Welsh–Ryan Arena | | Northwestern |
| November 18 | 17 Alabama | 27 | 21 Auburn | 31 | Auburn, Alabama | | Iron Bowl | Alabama |
| November 25 | 6 Florida State | 24 | 3 Florida | 35 | Gainesville, Florida | | Rivalry | |
| January 2, 1996 | 2 Florida | 24 | 1 Nebraska | 62 | Tempe, Arizona | Outside Sun Devil Stadium | Fiesta Bowl – Bowl Alliance National Championship Game | Florida |

== 1996 season ==
| Date | Visiting team | | Home team | | City | Location | Notes | Lee Corso headgear pick |
|---|---|---|---|---|---|---|---|---|
| September 14 | 11 Michigan | 20 | 5 Colorado | 13 | Boulder, Colorado | | | |
| September 21 | 4 Florida | 35 | 2 Tennessee | 29 | Knoxville, Tennessee | | Rivalry | |
| September 28 | 4 Ohio State | 29 | 5 Notre Dame | 16 | South Bend, Indiana | | | |
| October 5 | 4 Penn State | 7 | 3 Ohio State | 38 | Columbus, Ohio | Outside Ohio Stadium | Lee Corso's first headgear pick; rivalry | Ohio State |
| October 26 | 2 Ohio State | 38 | 20 Iowa | 26 | Iowa City, Iowa | Outside Kinnick Stadium | | Ohio State |
| November 9 | 10 Alabama | 26 | 11 LSU | 0 | Baton Rouge, Louisiana | Outside Tiger Stadium | Rivalry | Alabama |
| November 23 | Auburn | 23 | 15 Alabama | 24 | Birmingham, Alabama | Legion Field | Iron Bowl | Alabama |
| November 30 | 1 Florida | 21 | 2 Florida State | 24 | Tallahassee, Florida | Dick Howser Stadium | Rivalry | Florida (Note: Corso picked Florida to win but had no headgear.) |
| January 2, 1997 | 3 Florida | 52 | 1 Florida State | 20 | New Orleans, Louisiana | | Sugar Bowl – Bowl Alliance National Championship Game; rivalry | |

== 1997 season ==
| Date | Visiting team | | Home team | | City | Location | Notes | Lee Corso headgear pick |
|---|---|---|---|---|---|---|---|---|
| August 30 | None | | | | Bristol, Connecticut | Broadcast from ESPN's Bristol studios | | |
| September 6 | None | | | | Bristol, Connecticut | Broadcast from ESPN's Bristol studios | | |
| September 13 | 8 Colorado | 3 | 14 Michigan | 27 | Ann Arbor, Michigan | | | Colorado |
| September 20 | 4 Tennessee | 20 | 1 Florida | 33 | Gainesville, Florida | | Rivalry | Florida |
| October 4 | 8 Iowa | 7 | 7 Ohio State | 23 | Columbus, Ohio | | | Iowa |
| October 11 | 1 Florida | 21 | 14 LSU | 28 | Baton Rouge, Louisiana | | Rivalry | Florida |
| October 18 | 7 Florida | 24 | 6 Auburn | 10 | Auburn, Alabama | | Rivalry | Florida |
| October 25 | 5 Michigan | 23 | 14 Michigan State | 7 | East Lansing, Michigan | Outside Spartan Stadium | Rivalry | Michigan |
| November 8 | 2 Florida State | 20 | 5 North Carolina | 3 | Chapel Hill, North Carolina | Kenan Memorial Stadium | | Florida State |
| November 22 | 2 Florida State | 29 | 10 Florida | 32 | Gainesville, Florida | | Rivalry | |
| January 1, 1998 | 8 Washington State | 16 | 1 Michigan | 21 | Pasadena, California | | Rose Bowl | |
| January 2, 1998 | 3 Tennessee | 17 | 2 Nebraska | 42 | Miami, Florida | | Orange Bowl – Bowl Alliance National Championship Game | |

== 1998 season ==
| Date | Visiting team | | Home team | | City | Location | Notes | Lee Corso headgear pick |
|---|---|---|---|---|---|---|---|---|
| September 5 | 5 Michigan | 20 | 22 Notre Dame | 36 | South Bend, Indiana | | Rivalry | Michigan |
| September 26 | 9 Washington | 7 | 2 Nebraska | 55 | Lincoln, Nebraska | | | Nebraska |
| October 3 | 7 Penn State | 9 | 1 Ohio State | 28 | Columbus, Ohio | | Rivalry | Ohio State |
| October 10 | 5 Tennessee | 22 | 7 Georgia | 3 | Athens, Georgia | Outside Sanford Stadium | Rivalry | Georgia |
| October 17 | 11 Oregon | 38 | 2 UCLA | 41^{OT} | Pasadena, California | Rose Bowl | | UCLA |
| October 24 | 5 Florida State | 34 | 23 Georgia Tech | 7 | Atlanta, Georgia | | | Florida State |
| November 14 | 11 Nebraska | 30 | 2 Kansas State | 40 | Manhattan, Kansas | KSU Stadium | Rivalry | Kansas State |
| December 5 | 3 UCLA | 45 | Miami (FL) | 49 | Miami, Florida | Miami Orange Bowl | | UCLA |
| January 4, 1999 | 2 Florida State | 16 | 1 Tennessee | 23 | Tempe, Arizona | | Fiesta Bowl – BCS National Championship Game | Florida State |

== 1999 season ==
| Date | Visiting team | | Home team | | City | Location | Notes | Lee Corso headgear pick |
|---|---|---|---|---|---|---|---|---|
| August 28 | 4 Arizona | 7 | 3 Penn State | 41 | University Park, Pennsylvania | Outside Beaver Stadium | Pigskin Classic | Penn State |
| September 4 | 16 Notre Dame | 22 | 7 Michigan | 26 | Ann Arbor, Michigan | | Rivalry | None |
| September 18 | 2 Tennessee | 21 | 4 Florida | 23 | Gainesville, Florida | Outside Ben Hill Griffin Stadium | Rivalry | Florida |
| September 25 | 4 Michigan | 21 | 20 Wisconsin | 16 | Madison, Wisconsin | | | Michigan |
| October 9 | 3 Michigan | 31 | 11 Michigan State | 34 | East Lansing, Michigan | Outside Spartan Stadium | Rivalry | Michigan State |
| October 16 | 16 Syracuse | 0 | 4 Virginia Tech | 62 | Blacksburg, Virginia | Lane Stadium | | Virginia Tech |
| October 23 | 3 Nebraska | 20 | 18 Texas | 24 | Austin, Texas | Darrell K Royal–Texas Memorial Stadium | | Texas |
| October 30 | 10 Georgia | 14 | 5 Florida | 34 | Jacksonville, Florida | | Rivalry | Florida |
| November 6 | Notre Dame | 14 | 4 Tennessee | 38 | Knoxville, Tennessee | | | Tennessee |
| November 13 | 19 Miami (FL) | 10 | 2 Virginia Tech | 43 | Blacksburg, Virginia | Lane Stadium | Rivalry | Virginia Tech |
| November 20 | 1 Florida State | 30 | 4 Florida | 23 | Gainesville, Florida | | Rivalry | Florida State |
| January 4, 2000 | 2 Virginia Tech | 29 | 1 Florida State | 46 | New Orleans, Louisiana | Louisiana Superdome | Sugar Bowl – BCS National Championship Game | Florida State |

== 2000 season ==
| Date | Visiting team | | Home team | | City | Location | Notes | Lee Corso headgear pick |
|---|---|---|---|---|---|---|---|---|
| August 27 | Georgia Tech | – | 11 Virginia Tech | – | Blacksburg, Virginia | | Game was canceled due to lightning; BCA Classic; rivalry | Virginia Tech |
| September 9 | 1 Nebraska | 27 | 23 Notre Dame | 24 | South Bend, Indiana | Library Lawn | | Nebraska |
| September 16 | 6 Florida | 27 | 11 Tennessee | 23 | Knoxville, Tennessee | Outside Thompson–Boling Arena | Rivalry | Florida |
| September 23 | 6 UCLA | 10 | Oregon | 29 | Eugene, Oregon | Outside Autzen Stadium | | Oregon |
| September 30 | 17 Wisconsin | 10 | 9 Michigan | 13 | Ann Arbor, Michigan | | | Michigan |
| October 7 | 1 Florida State | 24 | 7 Miami (FL) | 27 | Miami, Florida | Outside Miami Orange Bowl | Rivalry | Florida State |
| October 14 | 8 Oklahoma | 41 | 2 Kansas State | 31 | Manhattan, Kansas | KSU Stadium | | Kansas State |
| October 28 | 1 Nebraska | 14 | 3 Oklahoma | 31 | Norman, Oklahoma | Oklahoma Memorial Stadium | Rivalry | Oklahoma |
| November 4 | 2 Virginia Tech | 21 | 3 Miami (FL) | 41 | Miami, Florida | Outside Miami Orange Bowl | Rivalry | Miami (FL) |
| November 11 | 1 Oklahoma | 35 | 23 Texas A&M | 31 | College Station, Texas | Kyle Field | | Texas A&M |
| November 18 | 4 Florida | 7 | 3 Florida State | 30 | Tallahassee, Florida | Langford Green | Rivalry | Florida State |
| December 2 | 8 Kansas State | 24 | 1 Oklahoma | 27 | Kansas City, Missouri | Outside Arrowhead Stadium | Big 12 Championship Game | Kansas State |
| January 3, 2001 | 3 Florida State | 2 | 1 Oklahoma | 13 | Miami, Florida | Pro Player Stadium | Orange Bowl – BCS National Championship Game | Florida State |

== 2001 season ==
| Date | Visiting team | | Home team | | City | Location | Notes | Lee Corso headgear pick |
|---|---|---|---|---|---|---|---|---|
| September 1 | 17 UCLA | 20 | 25 Alabama | 17 | Tuscaloosa, Alabama | The Quad | | Alabama |
| September 8 | 17 Notre Dame | 10 | 5 Nebraska | 27 | Lincoln, Nebraska | Memorial Stadium | | Nebraska |
| September 15 | 10 Georgia Tech | – | 6 Florida State | – | Tallahassee, Florida | | Game postponed and rescheduled to December 1 due to the September 11 attacks | |
| September 29 | 11 Kansas State | 37 | 3 Oklahoma | 38 | Norman, Oklahoma | Oklahoma Memorial Stadium | | Kansas State |
| October 6 | 3 Oklahoma | 14 | 5 Texas | 3 | Dallas, Texas | Texas State Fair | Red River Showdown | Texas |
| October 13 | 1 Miami (FL) | 49 | 14 Florida State | 27 | Tallahassee, Florida | Doak Campbell Stadium | Rivalry | Miami (FL) |
| October 27 | 1 Oklahoma | 10 | 2 Nebraska | 20 | Lincoln, Nebraska | Memorial Stadium | Rivalry | Oklahoma |
| November 3 | Army | 24 | Air Force | 34 | Colorado Springs, Colorado | Academy Terrazzo | Commander-in-Chief's Trophy | Air Force |
| November 10 | 4 Florida | 54 | 14 South Carolina | 17 | Columbia, South Carolina | South Carolina State Fairgrounds | | Florida |
| November 17 | 14 Syracuse | 0 | 1 Miami (FL) | 59 | Miami, Florida | Outside Miami Orange Bowl | | Miami (FL) |
| November 24 | None | | | | Bristol, Connecticut | Broadcast from ESPN's Bristol studios | | |
| December 1 | 5 Tennessee | 34 | 2 Florida | 32 | Gainesville, Florida | Outside Ben Hill Griffin Stadium | Rivalry | Florida |
| January 3, 2002 | 4 Nebraska | 14 | 1 Miami (FL) | 37 | Pasadena, California | Inside the Rose Bowl | Rose Bowl – BCS National Championship Game; rivalry | Nebraska |

== 2002 season ==
| Date | Visiting team | | Home team | | City | Location | Notes | Lee Corso headgear pick |
|---|---|---|---|---|---|---|---|---|
| August 31 | 11 Washington | 29 | 13 Michigan | 31 | Ann Arbor, Michigan | Michigan Stadium | | Washington |
| September 7 | 1 Miami (FL) | 41 | 6 Florida | 16 | Gainesville, Florida | Outside Ben Hill Griffin Stadium | Rivalry | Florida |
| September 14 | 10 Washington State | 7 | 6 Ohio State | 25 | Columbus, Ohio | Outside St. John Arena | | Ohio State |
| September 21 | 10 Florida | 30 | 4 Tennessee | 13 | Knoxville, Tennessee | Outside Thompson–Boling Arena | Rivalry | Tennessee |
| October 5 | 6 Georgia | 27 | 22 Alabama | 25 | Tuscaloosa, Alabama | The Quad | Rivalry | Alabama |
| October 12 | 3 Texas | 24 | 2 Oklahoma | 35 | Dallas, Texas | Texas State Fair | Red River Showdown | Texas |
| October 19 | 7 Notre Dame | 21 | 18 Air Force | 14 | Colorado Springs, Colorado | Academy Terrazzo | | Air Force |
| October 26 | 6 Notre Dame | 34 | 11 Florida State | 24 | Tallahassee, Florida | Doak Campbell Stadium | | Florida State |
| November 2 | 22 Florida | 20 | 5 Georgia | 13 | Jacksonville, Florida | | Rivalry | Georgia |
| November 9 | 2 Miami (FL) | 26 | Tennessee | 3 | Knoxville, Tennessee | Outside Thompson–Boling Arena | | Miami (FL) |
| November 16 | Harvard | 9 | 17^{FCS} Penn | 44 | Philadelphia, Pennsylvania | Franklin Field | FCS; rivalry | Penn |
| November 23 | 12 Michigan | 9 | 2 Ohio State | 14 | Columbus, Ohio | Outside St. John Arena | The Game | Ohio State |
| December 7 | None | | | | Bristol, Connecticut | Broadcast from ESPN's Bristol studios | | |
| January 3, 2003 | 2 Ohio State | 31^{2OT} | 1 Miami (FL) | 24 | Tempe, Arizona | Sun Devil Stadium | Fiesta Bowl – BCS National Championship Game | Miami (FL) |

== 2003 season ==
| Date | Visiting team | | Home team | | City | Location | Notes | Lee Corso headgear pick |
|---|---|---|---|---|---|---|---|---|
| August 30 | 17 Washington | 9 | 2 Ohio State | 28 | Columbus, Ohio | Outside St. John Arena | | Ohio State |
| September 6 | 1 Oklahoma | 20 | Alabama | 13 | Tuscaloosa, Alabama | The Quad | | Oklahoma |
| September 13 | 15 Notre Dame | 0 | 5 Michigan | 38 | Ann Arbor, Michigan | Seventh tee of Ann Arbor Golf and Outing Course | Rivalry | Michigan |
| September 20 | 7 Georgia | 10 | 11 LSU | 17 | Baton Rouge, Louisiana | Outside Pete Maravich Assembly Center | | LSU |
| September 27 | South Florida | 28 | Army | 0 | West Point, New York | Patton Field | Show ended early due to lightning | None (Note: Corso would have picked South Florida to win with the headgear pick, with the chaos of the inclement weather leading the head to inadvertently be sent to the ESPN headquarters.) |
| October 4 | 16 Kansas State | 20 | 13 Texas | 24 | Austin, Texas | | First flying of the Ol' Crimson flag | Texas |
| October 11 | 2 Miami (FL) | 22 | 5 Florida State | 14 | Tallahassee, Florida | Doak Campbell Stadium | Rivalry | Florida State |
| October 18 | 13 Purdue | 26 | 14 Wisconsin | 23 | Madison, Wisconsin | University of Wisconsin practice field | | Wisconsin |
| October 25 | 12 Northern Illinois | 18 | 23 Bowling Green | 34 | Bowling Green, Ohio | Outside Doyt L. Perry Stadium | | Bowling Green |
| November 1 | 14 Oklahoma State | 9 | 1 Oklahoma | 52 | Norman, Oklahoma | Outside McCasland Field House | Bedlam Series | Oklahoma |
| November 8 | 5 Virginia Tech | 28 | 25 Pittsburgh | 31 | Pittsburgh, Pennsylvania | North Shore Great Lawn | | Pittsburgh |
| November 15 | 11 Purdue | 13 | 4 Ohio State | 16^{OT} | Columbus, Ohio | | | Ohio State |
| November 22 | 4 Ohio State | 21 | 5 Michigan | 35 | Ann Arbor, Michigan | | The Game | Michigan |
| November 29 | 9 Florida State | 38 | 11 Florida | 34 | Gainesville, Florida | Outside Ben Hill Griffin Stadium | Rivalry | Florida |
| December 6 | 5 Georgia | 13 | 3 LSU | 34 | Atlanta, Georgia | | SEC Championship Game | |
| January 1, 2004 | 4 Michigan | 14 | 1 USC | 28 | Pasadena, California | Outside the Rose Bowl | Rose Bowl | USC |
| January 4, 2004 | 3 LSU | 21 | 2 Oklahoma | 14 | New Orleans, Louisiana | Superdome | Sugar Bowl – BCS National Championship Game | LSU |

== 2004 season ==
| Date | Visiting team | | Home team | | City | Location | Notes | Guest picker | Lee Corso headgear pick |
|---|---|---|---|---|---|---|---|---|---|
| September 4 | Oregon State | 21 | 4 LSU | 22 | Baton Rouge, Louisiana | Parade Ground | | | LSU |
| September 11 | 4 Georgia | 20 | South Carolina | 16 | Columbia, South Carolina | South Carolina State Fairgrounds | Rivalry | | South Carolina |
| September 18 | Notre Dame | 31 | Michigan State | 24 | East Lansing, Michigan | | Rivalry | | Notre Dame |
| September 25 | Penn State | 3 | 20 Wisconsin | 16 | Madison, Wisconsin | University of Wisconsin practice field | | | Wisconsin |
| October 2 | 8 Auburn | 34 | 10 Tennessee | 10 | Knoxville, Tennessee | Outside Thompson–Boling Arena | Rivalry | Charles Barkley | Auburn |
| October 9 | 7 California | 17 | 1 USC | 23 | Los Angeles, California | Outside Los Angeles Memorial Coliseum | Rivalry | | USC |
| October 16 | 10 Wisconsin | 20 | 5 Purdue | 17 | West Lafayette, Indiana | Rankin Track and Field | | | Purdue |
| October 23 | 3 Miami (FL) | 45 | NC State | 31 | Raleigh, North Carolina | Outside Carter–Finley Stadium | | | NC State |
| October 30 | 2 Oklahoma | 38 | 20 Oklahoma State | 35 | Stillwater, Oklahoma | Outside Boone Pickens Stadium | Bedlam Series | | Oklahoma |
| November 13 | 5 Georgia | 6 | 3 Auburn | 24 | Auburn, Alabama | | Deep South's Oldest Rivalry | | Auburn |
| November 20 | BYU | 21 | 6 Utah | 52 | Salt Lake City, Utah | Outside Rice–Eccles Stadium | Holy War | | Utah |
| November 27 | Notre Dame | 10 | 1 USC | 41 | Los Angeles, California | Outside Los Angeles Memorial Coliseum | Rivalry | | USC |
| December 4 | 3 Auburn | 38 | 15 Tennessee | 28 | Atlanta, Georgia | | Rivalry – SEC Championship Game | Charles Barkley | Auburn |
| January 4, 2005 | 2 Oklahoma | 19 | 1 USC | 55 | Miami Gardens, Florida | Pro Player Stadium | Orange Bowl – BCS National Championship Game | | USC |

== 2005 season ==
| Date | Visiting team | | Home team | | City | Location | Notes | Lee Corso headgear pick |
|---|---|---|---|---|---|---|---|---|
| September 1 | UCF | 15 | South Carolina | 24 | Columbia, South Carolina | | | |
| September 3 | Notre Dame | 42 | 23 Pittsburgh | 21 | Pittsburgh, Pennsylvania | North Shore Great Lawn | Rivalry | Pittsburgh |
| September 10 | 2 Texas | 25 | 4 Ohio State | 22 | Columbus, Ohio | | | Ohio State |
| September 17 | 8 Florida State | 28 | 17 Boston College | 17 | Chestnut Hill, Massachusetts | Campus Green | | Florida State |
| September 24 (Note: The September 24 episode was originally scheduled to originate from Baton Rouge for Tennessee vs. LSU, but that game was postponed to Monday, September 26, due to the approach of Hurricane Rita.) | 16 Georgia Tech | 7 | 4 Virginia Tech | 51 | Blacksburg, Virginia | Alumni Hall | Rivalry | Virginia Tech |
| October 1 | 1 USC | 38 | 14 Arizona State | 28 | Tempe, Arizona | ASU Lot 59 | | USC |
| October 8 | 6 Ohio State | 10 | 16 Penn State | 17 | University Park, Pennsylvania | Outside Bryce Jordan Center | White Out game; rivalry | Ohio State |
| October 15 | 1 USC | 34 | 9 Notre Dame | 31 | South Bend, Indiana | Library Lawn | Rivalry | USC |
| October 22 | 8 Texas Tech | 17 | 2 Texas | 52 | Austin, Texas | Mike A. Myers Stadium | Rivalry | Texas |
| October 29 | 16 Florida | 14 | 4 Georgia | 10 | Jacksonville, Florida | | Rivalry | Georgia |
| November 5 | 5 Miami (FL) | 27 | 3 Virginia Tech | 7 | Blacksburg, Virginia | Alumni Hall | Rivalry | Miami (FL) |
| November 12 | 5 LSU | 16^{OT} | 4 Alabama | 13 | Tuscaloosa, Alabama | The Quad | Rivalry | LSU |
| November 19 | 5 Penn State | 31 | Michigan State | 22 | East Lansing, Michigan | Outside Spartan Stadium | Rivalry | Penn State |
| November 26 | Southern | 35 | 11^{FCS} Grambling State | 50 | Houston, Texas | Reliant Stadium | FCS; Bayou Classic | Grambling State |
| December 3 | 11 UCLA | 19 | 1 USC | 66 | Los Angeles, California | | Rivalry | USC |
| January 4, 2006 | 2 Texas | 41 | 1 USC | 38 | Pasadena, California | Inside the Rose Bowl | Rose Bowl – BCS National Championship Game; Game of the Century | Texas |

== 2006 season ==
| Date | Visiting team | | Home team | | City | Location | Notes | Lee Corso headgear pick |
|---|---|---|---|---|---|---|---|---|
| September 2 | 2 Notre Dame | 14 | Georgia Tech | 10 | Atlanta, Georgia | Yellow Jacket Park | | Notre Dame |
| September 4 | 11 Florida State | 13 | 12 Miami (FL) | 10 | Miami, Florida | Outside Miami Orange Bowl | Rivalry | Miami (FL) |
| September 9 | 1 Ohio State | 24 | 2 Texas | 7 | Austin, Texas | Mike A. Myers Stadium | | Texas |
| September 16 | 19 Nebraska | 10 | 4 USC | 28 | Los Angeles, California | Outside Los Angeles Memorial Coliseum | | USC |
| September 23 | 24 Penn State | 6 | 1 Ohio State | 28 | Columbus, Ohio | | Rivalry | Ohio State |
| September 30 | 1 Ohio State | 38 | 13 Iowa | 17 | Iowa City, Iowa | Hubbard Park | | Iowa |
| October 7 | 9 LSU | 10 | 5 Florida | 23 | Gainesville, Florida | Outside Ben Hill Griffin Stadium | Rivalry | Florida |
| October 14 | 2 Florida | 17 | 11 Auburn | 27 | Auburn, Alabama | | Rivalry | Florida |
| October 21 | 13 Georgia Tech | 7 | 12 Clemson | 31 | Clemson, South Carolina | Bowman Field | Rivalry | Clemson |
| October 28 | 8 Tennessee | 31 | South Carolina | 24 | Columbia, South Carolina | South Carolina State Fairgrounds | | Tennessee |
| November 4 | 18 Oklahoma | 17 | 21 Texas A&M | 16 | College Station, Texas | Cain Park | Rece Davis filled in as host | Oklahoma |
| November 11 | 13 Tennessee | 14 | 11 Arkansas | 31 | Fayetteville, Arkansas | University Parking Lot 44 | | Arkansas |
| November 18 | 2 Michigan | 39 | 1 Ohio State | 42 | Columbus, Ohio | Outside St. John Arena | The Game; Game of the Century | Michigan |
| November 25 | 6 Notre Dame | 24 | 2 USC | 44 | Los Angeles, California | Outside Los Angeles Memorial Coliseum | Rivalry | USC |
| January 1, 2007 | 8 USC | 32 | 3 Michigan | 18 | Pasadena, California | Inside the Rose Bowl | Rose Bowl | USC |
| January 8, 2007 | 2 Florida | 41 | 1 Ohio State | 14 | Glendale, Arizona | | BCS National Championship Game | Florida |

== 2007 season ==
| Date | Visiting team | | Home team | | City | Location | Notes | Lee Corso headgear pick |
|---|---|---|---|---|---|---|---|---|
| September 1 | East Carolina | 7 | 9 Virginia Tech | 17 | Blacksburg, Virginia | Outside Lane Stadium | Tribute to the victims of the April 16th campus shooting | Virginia Tech |
| September 8 | 9 Virginia Tech | 7 | 2 LSU | 48 | Baton Rouge, Louisiana | Parade Ground | | LSU |
| September 15 | 1 USC | 49 | 14 Nebraska | 31 | Lincoln, Nebraska | Memorial Stadium | | USC |
| September 22 | 22 Georgia | 26^{OT} | 16 Alabama | 23 | Tuscaloosa, Alabama | Walk of Champions outside Bryant–Denny Stadium | Rivalry | Alabama |
| September 29 | 6 California | 31 | 11 Oregon | 24 | Eugene, Oregon | Outside Autzen Stadium | | Oregon |
| October 6 | 9 Florida | 24 | 1 LSU | 28 | Baton Rouge, Louisiana | Parade Ground | Rivalry | LSU |
| October 13 | 11 Missouri | 31 | 6 Oklahoma | 41 | Norman, Oklahoma | John Jacobs Track & Field Complex | Rivalry | Oklahoma |
| October 20 | 14 Florida | 45 | 8 Kentucky | 37 | Lexington, Kentucky | Outside William T. Young Library | Rivalry | Florida |
| October 27 | 1 Ohio State | 37 | 25 Penn State | 17 | University Park, Pennsylvania | Outside Bryce Jordan Center | Rivalry | Ohio State |
| November 3 | 6 Arizona State | 23 | 4 Oregon | 35 | Eugene, Oregon | Autzen Stadium | | Oregon |
| November 10 | Amherst | 0 | Williams | 20 | Williamstown, Massachusetts | Outside Weston Field | NCAA Division III; The Biggest Little Game in America | Williams |
| November 17 | 7 Ohio State | 14 | 23 Michigan | 3 | Ann Arbor, Michigan | | The Game | Ohio State |
| November 24 | 3 Missouri | 36 | 2 Kansas | 28 | Kansas City, Missouri | Arrowhead Stadium | Border War | Missouri |
| December 1 | 9 Oklahoma | 38 | 1 Missouri | 17 | San Antonio, Texas | The Alamo | Big 12 Championship Game; rivalry | Missouri |
| January 1, 2008 | 13 Illinois | 17 | 6 USC | 49 | Pasadena, California | Inside the Rose Bowl | Rose Bowl | USC |
| January 7, 2008 | 2 LSU | 38 | 1 Ohio State | 24 | New Orleans, Louisiana | | BCS National Championship Game | Ohio State |

== 2008 season ==
| Date | Visiting team | | Home team | | City | Location | Notes | Guest picker | Lee Corso headgear pick |
|---|---|---|---|---|---|---|---|---|---|
| April 12 | Florida Orange | – | Florida Blue | – | Gainesville, Florida | | Florida "Orange & Blue Debut" spring scrimmage | | |
| August 30 | 24 Alabama | 34 | 9 Clemson | 10 | Atlanta, Georgia | Centennial Olympic Park | Chick-fil-A Kickoff Game; rivalry | | Clemson |
| September 6 | Miami (FL) | 3 | 5 Florida | 26 | Gainesville, Florida | Outside Ben Hill Griffin Stadium | Rivalry | | Florida |
| September 13 | 5 Ohio State | 3 | 1 USC | 35 | Los Angeles, California | Outside Los Angeles Memorial Coliseum | | | USC |
| September 20 | 6 LSU | 26 | 9 Auburn | 21 | Auburn, Alabama | Campus Green | Rivalry | | Auburn |
| September 27 | 8 Alabama | 41 | 3 Georgia | 30 | Athens, Georgia | Myers Quad | Rivalry | | Alabama |
| October 4 | 13 Auburn | 13 | 19 Vanderbilt | 14 | Nashville, Tennessee | The Commons | | Kenny Chesney | Auburn |
| October 11 | 5 Texas | 45 | 1 Oklahoma | 35 | Dallas, Texas | Texas State Fair | Red River Showdown | | Oklahoma |
| October 18 | 11 Missouri | 31 | 1 Texas | 56 | Austin, Texas | South side of UT Tower | | | Texas |
| October 25 | 3 Penn State | 13 | 10 Ohio State | 6 | Columbus, Ohio | Outside St. John Arena | Rivalry | LeBron James | Ohio State |
| November 1 | 1 Texas | 33 | 6 Texas Tech | 39 | Lubbock, Texas | Engineering Key | Rivalry | Bobby Knight | Texas Tech |
| November 8 | 1 Alabama | 27^{OT} | 15 LSU | 21 | Baton Rouge, Louisiana | Old Front 9 | Rivalry | | Alabama |
| November 15 | Hampton | 24 | Florida A&M | 45 | Tallahassee, Florida | FAMU quadrangle | FCS | | Florida A&M |
| November 22 | 2 Texas Tech | 21 | 5 Oklahoma | 65 | Norman, Oklahoma | John Jacobs Track & Field Complex | | | Oklahoma |
| November 29 | 3 Oklahoma | 61 | 11 Oklahoma State | 41 | Stillwater, Oklahoma | Edmon Low Library Lawn | Bedlam Series | | Oklahoma |
| December 6 | 1 Alabama | 20 | 2 Florida | 31 | Atlanta, Georgia | | SEC Championship Game | | Alabama |
| January 1, 2009 | 6 Penn State | 24 | 5 USC | 38 | Pasadena, California | Inside the Rose Bowl | Rose Bowl | | USC |
| January 8, 2009 | 2 Oklahoma | 14 | 1 Florida | 24 | Miami Gardens, Florida | | BCS National Championship Game | | Florida |

== 2009 season ==
| Date | Visiting team | | Home team | | City | Location | Notes | Guest picker | Lee Corso headgear pick |
|---|---|---|---|---|---|---|---|---|---|
| September 5 | 5 Alabama | 34 | 7 Virginia Tech | 24 | Atlanta, Georgia | Centennial Olympic Park | Chick-fil-A Kickoff Game | Chipper Jones | Alabama |
| September 12 | 3 USC | 18 | 8 Ohio State | 15 | Columbus, Ohio | Outside St. John Arena | | Santonio Holmes | USC |
| September 19 | Texas Tech | 24 | 2 Texas | 34 | Austin, Texas | South side of UT Tower | Rivalry | Lance Armstrong | Texas |
| September 26 | Iowa | 21 | 4 Penn State | 10 | University Park, Pennsylvania | Outside Bryce Jordan Center | White Out game | | Penn State |
| October 3 | Florida State | 21 | Boston College | 28 | Chestnut Hill, Massachusetts | Stokes Lawn | | Tedy Bruschi | Florida State |
| October 10 | 1 Florida | 13 | 4 LSU | 3 | Baton Rouge, Louisiana | Parade Ground | Rivalry | Drew Brees | LSU |
| October 17 | 20 Oklahoma | 13 | 3 Texas | 16 | Dallas, Texas | Outside the Cotton Bowl | Red River Showdown | Mark Cuban | Texas |
| October 24 | 7 TCU | 38 | 16 BYU | 7 | Provo, Utah | Outside LaVell Edwards Stadium | | Lavell Edwards | TCU |
| October 31 | 4 USC | 20 | 10 Oregon | 47 | Eugene, Oregon | Outside Autzen Stadium | Rivalry | Phil Knight | Oregon |
| November 7 | Army | 7 | Air Force | 35 | Colorado Springs, Colorado | Academy Terrazzo | Commander-in-Chief's Trophy | Spike Thomas | Air Force |
| November 14 | 16 Utah | 28 | 4 TCU | 55 | Fort Worth, Texas | Campus Commons | | | TCU |
| November 21 | 11 Oregon | 44^{2OT} | Arizona | 41 | Tucson, Arizona | UA Mall east of Old Main | | Amanda Beard | Oregon |
| November 28 | Florida State | 10 | 1 Florida | 37 | Gainesville, Florida | Outside Ben Hill Griffin Stadium | Rivalry | Nick Swisher | Florida |
| December 5 | 1 Florida | 13 | 2 Alabama | 32 | Atlanta, Georgia | | SEC Championship Game; Game of the Century; rivalry | Lane Kiffin | Alabama |
| January 1, 2010 | 8 Ohio State | 26 | 7 Oregon | 17 | Pasadena, California | Inside the Rose Bowl | Rose Bowl | Jake Olson | Oregon |
| January 7, 2010 | 2 Texas | 21 | 1 Alabama | 37 | Pasadena, California | | BCS National Championship Game | | Texas |

== 2010 season ==
| Date | Visiting team | | Home team | | City | Location | Notes | Guest picker | Lee Corso headgear pick |
|---|---|---|---|---|---|---|---|---|---|
| September 4 | 21 LSU | 30 | 18 North Carolina | 24 | Atlanta, Georgia | Centennial Olympic Park | Chick-fil-A Kickoff Game | Big Boi | LSU |
| September 11 | 18 Penn State | 3 | 1 Alabama | 24 | Tuscaloosa, Alabama | Walk of Champions outside Bryant–Denny Stadium | | Bobby Bowden | Alabama |
| September 18 | Clemson | 24 | 16 Auburn | 27^{OT} | Auburn, Alabama | Campus Green | Rivalry | | Auburn |
| September 25 | 24 Oregon State | 24 | 3 Boise State | 37 | Boise, Idaho | Inside Bronco Stadium | | Picabo Street | Boise State |
| October 2 | 9 Stanford | 31 | 4 Oregon | 52 | Eugene, Oregon | Outside Autzen Stadium | Rivalry | | Oregon |
| October 9 | 1 Alabama | 21 | 19 South Carolina | 35 | Columbia, South Carolina | Old Campus District | | | Alabama |
| October 16 | 1 Ohio State | 18 | 18 Wisconsin | 31 | Madison, Wisconsin | Camp Randall Stadium | | Nathan Followill | Wisconsin |
| October 23 | 1 Oklahoma | 27 | 11 Missouri | 36 | Columbia, Missouri | Francis Quadrangle | Rivalry | | Oklahoma |
| October 30 | 1 Oregon | 53 | 24 USC | 32 | Los Angeles, California | Outside Los Angeles Memorial Coliseum | Rivalry | Will Ferrell | Oregon |
| November 6 | 4 TCU | 47 | 6 Utah | 7 | Salt Lake City, Utah | Outside Rice-Eccles Stadium | | Ty Burrell | TCU |
| November 13 | Penn State | 24 | 7 Ohio State | 38 | Columbus, Ohio | Outside St. John Arena | Rivalry | Derek Poundstone | Ohio State |
| November 20 | Illinois | 48 | 25 Northwestern | 27 | Chicago, Illinois | Wrigley Field | Rivalry | Mike Ditka | Illinois |
| November 27 | 14 Oklahoma | 47 | 10 Oklahoma State | 41 | Stillwater, Oklahoma | Edmon Low Library Lawn | Bedlam Series | | Oklahoma State |
| December 4 | 1 Oregon | 37 | Oregon State | 20 | Corvallis, Oregon | Memorial Union Quad | Rivalry | | Oregon |
| January 1, 2011 | 4 Wisconsin | 19 | 3 TCU | 21 | Pasadena, California | Inside the Rose Bowl | Rose Bowl | | Wisconsin |
| January 3, 2011 | 5 Stanford | 40 | 12 Virginia Tech | 12 | Miami Gardens, Florida | | Orange Bowl | | |
| January 4, 2011 | 6 Ohio State | 31 | 8 Arkansas | 26 | New Orleans, Louisiana | Inside Louisiana Superdome | Sugar Bowl | | |
| January 10, 2011 | 2 Oregon | 19 | 1 Auburn | 22 | Glendale, Arizona | | BCS National Championship Game | | Oregon |

== 2011 season ==
| Date | Visiting team | | Home team | | City | Location | Notes | Guest picker | Lee Corso headgear pick |
|---|---|---|---|---|---|---|---|---|---|
| September 3 | 3 Oregon | 27 | 4 LSU | 40 | Arlington, Texas | Outside Cowboys Stadium | Cowboys Classic | Mark Cuban | LSU |
| September 10 | Notre Dame | 31 | Michigan | 35 | Ann Arbor, Michigan | Ingalls Mall | Rivalry | | Michigan |
| September 17 | 1 Oklahoma | 23 | 5 Florida State | 13 | Tallahassee, Florida | Langford Green | | | Oklahoma |
| September 24 | 2 LSU | 47 | 16 West Virginia | 21 | Morgantown, West Virginia | Mountainlair Plaza | | Bob Huggins | LSU |
| October 1 | 8 Nebraska | 17 | 7 Wisconsin | 48 | Madison, Wisconsin | Bascom Hill | Rivalry | Jerry Ferrara | Nebraska |
| October 8 | 3 Oklahoma | 55 | 11 Texas | 17 | Dallas, Texas | Hall of State | Red River Showdown | Blake Griffin | Oklahoma |
| October 15 | 18 Arizona State | 27 | 9 Oregon | 41 | Eugene, Oregon | Memorial Quad | | | Oregon |
| October 22 | 4 Wisconsin | 31 | 15 Michigan State | 37 | East Lansing, Michigan | Munn Intramural Field | | Mateen Cleaves | Wisconsin |
| October 29 | 4 Stanford | 56^{3OT} | 20 USC | 48 | Los Angeles, California | Outside Los Angeles Memorial Coliseum | Rivalry | Eric Stonestreet | Stanford |
| November 5 | 1 LSU | 9^{OT} | 2 Alabama | 6 | Tuscaloosa, Alabama | Walk of Champions outside Bryant–Denny Stadium | Rivalry – Game of the Century | Brian Wilson | LSU |
| November 12 | 6 Oregon | 53 | 3 Stanford | 30 | Stanford, California | Stanford Oval | Rivalry | Jim Plunkett | Stanford |
| November 19 | SMU | 7 | 10 Houston | 37 | Houston, Texas | Cullen Circle | Rivalry | Carl Lewis | Houston |
| November 26 | 2 Alabama | 42 | 24 Auburn | 14 | Auburn, Alabama | Outside Jordan–Hare Stadium | Iron Bowl | Bo Jackson | Alabama |
| December 3 | 12 Georgia | 10 | 1 LSU | 42 | Atlanta, Georgia | Centennial Olympic Park | SEC Championship Game | | LSU |
| January 2, 2012 | 9 Wisconsin | 38 | 6 Oregon | 45 | Pasadena, California | Inside the Rose Bowl | Rose Bowl | Lane Kiffin | Oregon |
| January 3, 2012 | 13 Michigan | 23 | 17 Virginia Tech | 20 | New Orleans, Louisiana | | Sugar Bowl | | |
| January 4, 2012 | 23 West Virginia | 70 | 14 Clemson | 33 | Miami Gardens, Florida | | Orange Bowl | | |
| January 9, 2012 | 2 Alabama | 21 | 1 LSU | 0 | New Orleans, Louisiana | | Rivalry – BCS National Championship Game | | LSU |

== 2012 season ==
| Date | Visiting team | | Home team | | City | Location | Notes | Guest picker | Lee Corso headgear pick |
|---|---|---|---|---|---|---|---|---|---|
| September 1 | 8 Michigan | 14 | 2 Alabama | 41 | Arlington, Texas | Outside Cowboys Stadium | Cowboys Kickoff Classic | Jerry Jones | Alabama |
| September 8 | 24 Florida | 20 | Texas A&M | 17 | College Station, Texas | Simpson Drill Field | | Jeff Van Gundy | Texas A&M |
| September 15 | 18 Florida | 37 | Tennessee | 20 | Knoxville, Tennessee | Circle Park | Rivalry | Kenny Chesney | Tennessee |
| September 22 | 10 Clemson | 37 | 4 Florida State | 49 | Tallahassee, Florida | Langford Green | Rivalry | Ricky Carmichael | Florida State |
| September 29 | 14 Ohio State | 17 | 20 Michigan State | 16 | East Lansing, Michigan | North of Beaumont Tower | | | Ohio State |
| October 6 | 5 Georgia | 7 | 6 South Carolina | 35 | Columbia, South Carolina | Old Campus District | Rivalry | Darius Rucker | South Carolina |
| October 13 | 17 Stanford | 13 | 7 Notre Dame | 20^{OT} | South Bend, Indiana | Liberty Quad | Rivalry | Vince Vaughn | Notre Dame |
| October 20 | 9 South Carolina | 11 | 3 Florida | 44 | Gainesville, Florida | Outside Ben Hill Griffin Stadium | | Ryan Lochte | Florida |
| October 27 | 5 Notre Dame | 30 | 8 Oklahoma | 13 | Norman, Oklahoma | South Oval | | Nathan Followill | Oklahoma |
| November 3 | 1 Alabama | 21 | 5 LSU | 17 | Baton Rouge, Louisiana | Northeast corner of Parade Ground | Rivalry | Lolo Jones | Alabama |
| November 10 | Navy | 31 | Troy | 41 | San Diego, California | Deck of the USS San Diego | | Curtis Sharpe | Navy |
| November 17 | 14 Stanford | 17^{OT} | 1 Oregon | 14 | Eugene, Oregon | Memorial Quad | Rivalry | Braden Pape | Oregon |
| November 24 | 1 Notre Dame | 22 | USC | 13 | Los Angeles, California | Outside of Los Angeles Memorial Coliseum | Rivalry | Landon Donovan | Notre Dame |
| December 1 | 2 Alabama | 32 | 3 Georgia | 28 | Atlanta, Georgia | Centennial Olympic Park | SEC Championship Game; rivalry | Matt Ryan | Alabama |
| January 1, 2013 | 23 Wisconsin | 14 | 8 Stanford | 20 | Pasadena, California | Inside the Rose Bowl | Rose Bowl | | Stanford |
| January 2, 2013 | 22 Louisville | 33 | 4 Florida | 23 | New Orleans, Louisiana | | Sugar Bowl | | |
| January 7, 2013 | 2 Alabama | 42 | 1 Notre Dame | 14 | Miami Gardens, Florida | | BCS National Championship Game | | Notre Dame |

== 2013 season ==
| Date | Visiting team | | Home team | | City | Location | Notes | Guest picker | Lee Corso headgear pick |
|---|---|---|---|---|---|---|---|---|---|
| August 31 | 5 Georgia | 35 | 8 Clemson | 38 | Clemson, South Carolina | Bowman Field | Rivalry | Eric Stonestreet | Georgia |
| September 7 | 13 Notre Dame | 30 | 17 Michigan | 41 | Ann Arbor, Michigan | Ingalls Mall | Rivalry | Mark Harmon | Notre Dame |
| September 14 | 1 Alabama | 49 | 6 Texas A&M | 42 | College Station, Texas | Simpson Drill Field | | Lyle Lovett | Alabama |
| September 21 | Delaware State | 0 | 1^{FCS} North Dakota State | 51 | Fargo, North Dakota | Outside Fargo Theatre | FCS | Phil Hansen | North Dakota State |
| September 28 | 6 LSU | 41 | 9 Georgia | 44 | Athens, Georgia | Myers Quad | | Willie Robertson, Bubba Watson | LSU |
| October 5 | 4 Ohio State | 40 | 16 Northwestern | 30 | Evanston, Illinois | The Lakefill on the banks of Lake Michigan | | Brent Musburger | Ohio State |
| October 12 | 2 Oregon | 45 | 16 Washington | 24 | Seattle, Washington | Red Square | Rivalry | Hope Solo, Warren Moon | Oregon |
| October 19 | 5 Florida State | 51 | 3 Clemson | 14 | Clemson, South Carolina | Bowman Field | Rivalry | Bill Murray | Florida State |
| October 26 | 12 UCLA | 14 | 2 Oregon | 42 | Eugene, Oregon | Memorial Quad | | Ashton Eaton | Oregon |
| November 2 | 7 Miami (FL) | 14 | 3 Florida State | 41 | Tallahassee, Florida | Langford Green | Rivalry | Jake Owen | Florida State |
| November 9 | 10 LSU | 17 | 1 Alabama | 38 | Tuscaloosa, Alabama | Walk of Champions outside Bryant–Denny Stadium | Rivalry | Jake Peavy | Alabama |
| November 16 | 5 Stanford | 17 | USC | 20 | Los Angeles, California | McCarthy Quad | Rivalry | Chris Fallica | USC |
| November 23 | 3 Baylor | 17 | 11 Oklahoma State | 49 | Stillwater, Oklahoma | Edmon Low Library Lawn | | Marcus Smart | Oklahoma State |
| November 30 | 1 Alabama | 28 | 4 Auburn | 34 | Auburn, Alabama | Campus Green | Iron Bowl | Charles Barkley | Alabama |
| December 7 | 2 Ohio State | 24 | 10 Michigan State | 34 | Indianapolis, Indiana | Pan Am Plaza | Big Ten Championship Game | Ryan Riess, Joey Chestnut | Ohio State |
| January 1, 2014 | 5 Stanford | 20 | 4 Michigan State | 24 | Pasadena, California | Inside the Rose Bowl | Rose Bowl | Magic Johnson | Michigan State |
| January 6, 2014 | 2 Auburn | 31 | 1 Florida State | 34 | Pasadena, California | Outside the Rose Bowl | BCS National Championship Game | | Florida State |

== 2014 season ==
| Date | Visiting team | | Home team | | City | Location | Notes | Guest picker | Lee Corso headgear pick |
|---|---|---|---|---|---|---|---|---|---|
| August 30 | 1 Florida State | 37 | Oklahoma State | 31 | Fort Worth, Texas (Note: Game was played in Arlington, Texas) | Sundance Square | Cowboys Classic | Stone Cold Steve Austin | Florida State |
| September 6 | 7 Michigan State | 27 | 3 Oregon | 46 | Eugene, Oregon | Memorial Quad | | Oregon Duck | Oregon |
| September 13 | Incarnate Word | 0 | 1^{FCS} North Dakota State | 58 | Fargo, North Dakota | Outside Fargo Theatre | FCS | Brock Jensen | North Dakota State |
| September 20 | 22 Clemson | 17 | 1 Florida State | 23^{OT} | Tallahassee, Florida | Langford Green | Rivalry | Gabrielle Reece | Florida State |
| September 27 | Missouri | 21 | 13 South Carolina | 20 | Columbia, South Carolina | Old Campus District | Mayor's Cup | Kenny Chesney | South Carolina |
| October 4 | 3 Alabama | 17 | 11 Ole Miss | 23 | Oxford, Mississippi | The Grove | Rivalry | Katy Perry | Alabama |
| October 11 | 2 Auburn | 23 | 3 Mississippi State | 38 | Starkville, Mississippi | The Junction | | Jonathan Papelbon | Mississippi State |
| October 18 | 5 Notre Dame | 27 | 2 Florida State | 31 | Tallahassee, Florida | Langford Green | | Ken Griffey Jr. | Florida State |
| October 25 | 3 Ole Miss | 7 | 24 LSU | 10 | Baton Rouge, Louisiana | Parade Grounds | Magnolia Bowl | Jase Robertson, Willie Robertson | LSU |
| November 1 | 10 TCU | 31 | 20 West Virginia | 30 | Morgantown, West Virginia | Mountainlair Plaza | | Brad Paisley | TCU |
| November 8 | 13 Ohio State | 49 | 7 Michigan State | 37 | East Lansing, Michigan | Demonstration Field | | Alice Cooper | Michigan State |
| November 15 | 1 Mississippi State | 20 | 4 Alabama | 25 | Tuscaloosa, Alabama | Walk of Champions outside Bryant–Denny Stadium | Rivalry | Marcus Lutrell | Alabama |
| November 22 | Yale | 24 | 14^{FCS} Harvard | 31 | Cambridge, Massachusetts | Dillon Quad | FCS; rivalry | Matt Birk | Yale |
| November 29 | 15 Auburn | 44 | 1 Alabama | 55 | Tuscaloosa, Alabama | Walk of Champions outside Bryant–Denny Stadium | Iron Bowl | Joe Namath | Alabama |
| December 6 | 9 Kansas State | 27 | 5 Baylor | 38 | Waco, Texas | Umphrey Pedestrian Bridge | | Mike Singletary | Kansas State |
| December 13 | Navy | 17 | Army | 10 | Baltimore, Maryland | Inner Harbor | Army–Navy Game | Roger Staubach | Navy |
| January 1, 2015 | 2 Oregon | 59 | 3 Florida State | 20 | Pasadena, California | Inside the Rose Bowl | Rose Bowl – CFP Semifinal | | Oregon |
| January 12, 2015 | 4 Ohio State | 42 | 2 Oregon | 20 | Fort Worth, Texas | Sundance Square | CFP National Championship | | Ohio State |

== 2015 season ==
| Date | Visiting team | | Home team | | City | Location | Notes | Guest picker | Lee Corso headgear pick |
|---|---|---|---|---|---|---|---|---|---|
| September 5 | 3 Alabama | 35 | 20 Wisconsin | 17 | Fort Worth, Texas | Sundance Square | Cowboys Classic | Brad Paisley | Alabama |
| September 12 | 7 Oregon | 28 | 5 Michigan State | 31 | East Lansing, Michigan | Munn Intramural Field | | Draymond Green | Oregon |
| September 19 | 15 Ole Miss | 43 | 2 Alabama | 37 | Tuscaloosa, Alabama | Walk of Champions outside Bryant–Denny Stadium | Rivalry | Eric Church | Alabama |
| September 26 | 9 UCLA | 56 | 16 Arizona | 30 | Tucson, Arizona | UA Mall east of Old Main | | Bob Baffert | Arizona |
| October 3 | 6 Notre Dame | 22 | 12 Clemson | 24 | Clemson, South Carolina | Bowman Field | | Jim Cantore | Notre Dame |
| October 10 | 23 California | 24 | 5 Utah | 30 | Salt Lake City, Utah | Presidents Circle | | John Stockton | Utah |
| October 17 | 7 Michigan State | 27 | 12 Michigan | 23 | Ann Arbor, Michigan | The Diag | Rivalry | Steve Spurrier | Michigan |
| October 24 | 11^{FCS} Richmond | 59 | 4^{FCS} James Madison | 49 | Harrisonburg, Virginia | JMU Quad | FCS; rivalry | Dierks Bentley | James Madison |
| October 31 | 9 Notre Dame | 24 | 21 Temple | 20 | Philadelphia, Pennsylvania | Outside Independence Hall | | Phillie Phanatic | Notre Dame |
| November 7 | 2 LSU | 16 | 4 Alabama | 30 | Tuscaloosa, Alabama | Walk of Champions outside Bryant–Denny Stadium | Rivalry | Rick Ross | LSU |
| November 14 | 12 Oklahoma | 44 | 6 Baylor | 34 | Waco, Texas | Umphrey Pedestrian Bridge | | Jeff Dunham | Baylor |
| November 21 | 9 Michigan State | 17 | 3 Ohio State | 14 | Columbus, Ohio | The Oval | | Archie Griffin | Ohio State |
| November 28 | 3 Oklahoma | 58 | 11 Oklahoma State | 23 | Stillwater, Oklahoma | Edmon Low Library Lawn | Bedlam Series | Ricky Fowler | Oklahoma State |
| December 5 | 5 Michigan State | 16 | 4 Iowa | 13 | Indianapolis, Indiana | Pan Am Plaza | Big Ten Championship Game | Dallas Clark | Michigan State |
| December 12 | Army | 17 | 21 Navy | 21 | Philadelphia, Pennsylvania | Outside Xfinity Live! | Army–Navy Game | Roger Staubach | Navy |
| December 31 | 4 Oklahoma | 17 | 1 Clemson | 37 | Miami Gardens, Florida | | Orange Bowl – CFP Semifinal | | Oklahoma |
| January 1, 2016 | 5 Stanford | 45 | 6 Iowa | 16 | Pasadena, California | | Rose Bowl | | Stanford |
| January 11, 2016 | 2 Alabama | 45 | 1 Clemson | 40 | Glendale, Arizona | | CFP National Championship; rivalry | | Clemson |

== 2016 season ==
| Date | Visiting team | | Home team | | City | Location | Notes | Guest picker | Lee Corso headgear pick |
|---|---|---|---|---|---|---|---|---|---|
| September 3 | 5 LSU | 14 | Wisconsin | 16 | Green Bay, Wisconsin | Lambeau Field | | Aaron Rodgers | LSU |
| September 10 | Virginia Tech | 24 | 17 Tennessee | 45 | Bristol, Tennessee | Bristol Motor Speedway | Battle at Bristol | Dale Earnhardt Jr. | Tennessee |
| September 17 | 2 Florida State | 20 | 10 Louisville | 63 | Louisville, Kentucky | Outside Papa John's Cardinal Stadium | | Laila Ali | Louisville |
| September 24 | 19 Florida | 28 | 14 Tennessee | 38 | Knoxville, Tennessee | Ayres Hall | Rivalry | Phillip Fulmer, Steve Spurrier | Florida |
| October 1 | 3 Louisville | 36 | 5 Clemson | 42 | Clemson, South Carolina | Bowman Field | | Eric Church | Clemson |
| October 8 | 9 Tennessee | 38 | 8 Texas A&M | 45^{2OT} | College Station, Texas | Spence Park | | The Chainsmokers | Texas A&M |
| October 15 | 2 Ohio State | 30^{OT} | 8 Wisconsin | 23 | Madison, Wisconsin | Bascom Hill | | Ric Flair | Ohio State |
| October 22 | 6 Texas A&M | 14 | 1 Alabama | 33 | Tuscaloosa, Alabama | Walk of Champions outside Bryant–Denny Stadium | | Verne Lundquist | Alabama |
| October 29 | 4 Washington | 31 | 17 Utah | 24 | Salt Lake City, Utah | Presidents Circle | | Frank Caliendo | Washington |
| November 5 | 1 Alabama | 10 | 13 LSU | 0 | Baton Rouge, Louisiana | The Quad | Rivalry | Lil Wayne | LSU |
| November 12 | 20 USC | 26 | 4 Washington | 13 | Seattle, Washington | Red Square | | Joel McHale | Washington |
| November 19 | Buffalo | 0 | 21 Western Michigan | 38 | Kalamazoo, Michigan | Sangren Pedestrian Mall | | Greg Jennings | Western Michigan |
| November 26 | 3 Michigan | 27 | 2 Ohio State | 30^{2OT} | Columbus, Ohio | Outside RPAC building | The Game | Orlando Pace | Ohio State |
| December 3 | 6 Wisconsin | 31 | 7 Penn State | 38 | Indianapolis, Indiana | Pan Am Plaza | Big Ten Championship Game | Keegan-Michael Key | Wisconsin |
| December 10 | 25 Navy | 17 | Army | 21 | Baltimore, Maryland | Inner Harbor | Army–Navy Game | Hugh McConnell, Stephen Phillips | Navy |
| December 31 | 3 Ohio State | 0 | 2 Clemson | 31 | Glendale, Arizona | | Fiesta Bowl – CFP Semifinal | | Ohio State |
| January 2, 2017 | 9 USC | 52 | 5 Penn State | 49 | Pasadena, California | | Rose Bowl | | USC |
| January 9, 2017 | 2 Clemson | 35 | 1 Alabama | 31 | Tampa, Florida | Outside Raymond James Stadium | CFP National Championship; rivalry | | Alabama |

== 2017 season ==
| Date | Visiting team | | Home team | | City | Location | Notes | Guest picker | Lee Corso headgear pick |
|---|---|---|---|---|---|---|---|---|---|
| August 31 | 2 Ohio State | 49 | Indiana | 21 | Bloomington, Indiana | Memorial Stadium | | | Ohio State |
| September 2 | 3 Florida State | 7 | 1 Alabama | 24 | Atlanta, Georgia | Georgia International Plaza | Chick-fil-A Kickoff Game | Sam Hunt | Alabama |
| September 9 | 5 Oklahoma | 31 | 2 Ohio State | 16 | Columbus, Ohio | The Oval | | Eddie George | Ohio State |
| September 16 | 3 Clemson | 47 | 14 Louisville | 21 | Louisville, Kentucky | Grawemeyer Hall | | Rick Pitino | Louisville |
| September 23 | None | | | | New York, New York | Times Square | | Keegan-Michael Key | Corso dressed as Lady Liberty and picked New York City |
| September 30 | 2 Clemson | 31 | 12 Virginia Tech | 17 | Blacksburg, Virginia | Alumni Mall | | Bruce Smith | Clemson |
| October 7 | 23 West Virginia | 24 | 8 TCU | 31 | Fort Worth, Texas | Campus Commons | | Tim McGraw | TCU |
| October 14 | 11^{FCS} Villanova | 8 | 1^{FCS} James Madison | 30 | Harrisonburg, Virginia | JMU Quad | FCS | Gene Wojciechowski | James Madison |
| October 21 | 19 Michigan | 13 | 2 Penn State | 42 | University Park, Pennsylvania | Old Main Lawn | White Out game; rivalry | Ki-Jana Carter | Penn State |
| October 28 | 2 Penn State | 38 | 6 Ohio State | 39 | Columbus, Ohio | Outside St. John Arena | Rivalry | Jack Nicklaus | Ohio State |
| November 4 | 5 Oklahoma | 62 | 11 Oklahoma State | 52 | Stillwater, Oklahoma | Edmon Low Library Lawn | Bedlam Series | Thurman Thomas | Oklahoma State |
| November 11 | 3 Notre Dame | 8 | 7 Miami (FL) | 41 | Coral Gables, Florida (Note: Game was played in Miami Gardens, Florida) | Lakeside Patio | | Alex Rodriguez | Notre Dame |
| November 18 | 24 Michigan | 10 | 5 Wisconsin | 24 | Madison, Wisconsin | Bascom Hill | | Craig T. Nelson | Wisconsin |
| November 25 | 1 Alabama | 14 | 6 Auburn | 26 | Auburn, Alabama | Samford Lawn | Iron Bowl | Charles Barkley | Alabama |
| December 2 | 7 Miami (FL) | 3 | 1 Clemson | 38 | Charlotte, North Carolina | Romare Bearden Park | ACC Championship Game | Luther Campbell | Clemson |
| December 9 | Army | 14 | Navy | 13 | Philadelphia, Pennsylvania | Outside Xfinity Live! | Army–Navy Game | Rob Riggle | Navy |
| January 1, 2018 | 3 Georgia | 54^{2OT} | 2 Oklahoma | 48 | Pasadena, California | | Rose Bowl – CFP Semifinal | | Oklahoma |
| January 8, 2018 | 4 Alabama | 26^{OT} | 3 Georgia | 23 | Atlanta, Georgia | Centennial Olympic Park | CFP National Championship; rivalry | | Alabama |
| April 26–27, 2018 | 2018 NFL draft | | | | Arlington, Texas | | Pre-show prior to Round 1 and Rounds 2–3 | | Mel Kiper (Note: Corso wore Mel Kiper's head as his headgear during the broadcast.) |

== 2018 season ==
| Date | Visiting team | | Home team | | City | Location | Notes | Guest picker | Lee Corso headgear pick |
|---|---|---|---|---|---|---|---|---|---|
| September 1 | 14 Michigan | 17 | 12 Notre Dame | 24 | South Bend, Indiana | Library Quad | Rivalry | Luke Bryan | Notre Dame |
| September 8 | 2 Clemson | 28 | Texas A&M | 26 | College Station, Texas | Aggie Park | | Owen Gray (Make-A-Wish recipient) | Clemson |
| September 15 | 4 Ohio State | 40 | 15 TCU | 28 | Fort Worth, Texas | Campus Commons | | Roman Reigns | Ohio State |
| September 22 | 7 Stanford | 38^{OT} | 20 Oregon | 31 | Eugene, Oregon | Memorial Quad | Rivalry | Tim Matheson | Oregon |
| September 29 | 4 Ohio State | 27 | 9 Penn State | 26 | University Park, Pennsylvania | Old Main Lawn | White Out game; rivalry | Keegan-Michael Key | Penn State |
| October 6 | 19 Texas | 48 | 7 Oklahoma | 45 | Dallas, Texas | Texas State Fair | Red River Showdown | Toby Keith | Oklahoma |
| October 13 | 15 Wisconsin | 13 | 12 Michigan | 38 | Ann Arbor, Michigan | Ingalls Mall | | The Chainsmokers | Wisconsin |
| October 20 | 12 Oregon | 20 | 25 Washington State | 34 | Pullman, Washington | Across from Cougar Pride statue | | Drew Bledsoe | Washington State |
| October 27 | 9 Florida | 17 | 7 Georgia | 36 | Jacksonville, Florida | Metropolitan Park | Rivalry | Evander Holyfield | Florida |
| November 3 | 1 Alabama | 29 | 3 LSU | 0 | Baton Rouge, Louisiana | The Quad | Rivalry | Alex Bregman | Alabama |
| November 10 | 2 Clemson | 27 | 17 Boston College | 7 | Chestnut Hill, Massachusetts | Stokes Lawn | O'Rourke–McFadden Trophy | Chris O'Donnell | Clemson |
| November 17 | 24 Cincinnati | 13 | 11 UCF | 38 | Orlando, Florida | Memory Mall | Rivalry | Maury Povich | UCF |
| November 24 | 4 Michigan | 39 | 10 Ohio State | 62 | Columbus, Ohio | Outside RPAC building | The Game | Bryce Harper | Michigan |
| December 1 | 1 Alabama | 35 | 4 Georgia | 28 | Atlanta, Georgia | Georgia International Plaza | SEC Championship Game; rivalry | Quavo | Alabama |
| December 8 | Navy | 10 | Army | 17 | Philadelphia, Pennsylvania | Outside Xfinity Live! | Army–Navy Game | Charles Barkley | Navy |
| December 29 | 4 Oklahoma | 34 | 1 Alabama | 45 | Miami Gardens, Florida | Outside Hotel Victor | Orange Bowl – CFP Semifinal | Brian Bosworth | Alabama |
| January 1, 2019 | 9 Washington | 23 | 6 Ohio State | 28 | Pasadena, California | Inside the Rose Bowl | Rose Bowl | | Ohio State |
| January 7, 2019 | 2 Clemson | 44 | 1 Alabama | 16 | Santa Clara, California | Champ Tailgate outside of Levi's Stadium | CFP National Championship; rivalry | | Clemson |
| April 25–27, 2019 | 2019 NFL draft | | | | Nashville, Tennessee | | Show was part of ESPN's entire NFL Draft coverage | | Dwayne Haskins (Note: Corso's headgear was for who he would take with the first pick of the draft.) |

== 2019 season ==
| Date | Visiting team | | Home team | | City | Location | Notes | Guest picker | Lee Corso headgear pick |
|---|---|---|---|---|---|---|---|---|---|
| August 24 | Miami (FL) | 20 | 8 Florida | 24 | Orlando, Florida | Magic Kingdom at Walt Disney World | Camping World Kickoff; rivalry | Michael Irvin | Florida |
| August 29 | Georgia Tech | 14 | 1 Clemson | 52 | Clemson, South Carolina | Memorial Stadium | Rivalry | | Clemson |
| August 31 | 11 Oregon | 21 | 16 Auburn | 27 | Fort Worth, Texas | Sundance Square | Advocare Classic | Bo Jackson | Oregon |
| September 7 | 6 LSU | 45 | 9 Texas | 38 | Austin, Texas | LBJ Lawn | | Matthew McConaughey | LSU |
| September 14 | 19 Iowa | 18 | Iowa State | 17 | Ames, Iowa | Between Sukup Endzone and Reimen Gardens | Cy–Hawk Trophy | Eric Church | Iowa State |
| September 21 | 7 Notre Dame | 17 | 3 Georgia | 23 | Athens, Georgia | Myers Quad | | Jeezy | Georgia |
| September 28 | 5 Ohio State | 48 | Nebraska | 7 | Lincoln, Nebraska | Outside Memorial Stadium | | Gabrielle Union and Dwyane Wade | Ohio State |
| October 5 | 7 Auburn | 13 | 10 Florida | 24 | Gainesville, Florida | Plaza of the Americas | Rivalry | Emmitt Smith | Florida |
| October 12 | 7 Florida | 28 | 5 LSU | 42 | Baton Rouge, Louisiana | Campus Quad | Rivalry | John Goodman | LSU |
| October 19 | 16 Michigan | 21 | 7 Penn State | 28 | University Park, Pennsylvania | HUB Lawn | White Out game; rivalry | Lara Spencer | Penn State |
| October 26 | 1^{FCS} North Dakota State | 23 | 3^{FCS} South Dakota State | 16 | Brookings, South Dakota | College Green | FCS; Dakota Marker | Pat McAfee | North Dakota State |
| November 2 | 15 SMU | 48 | 24 Memphis | 54 | Memphis, Tennessee | Beale Street, Downtown Memphis | | Jerry Lawler | SMU |
| November 9 | 2 LSU | 46 | 3 Alabama | 41 | Tuscaloosa, Alabama | The Quad | Game of the Century; rivalry | Justin Thomas | LSU |
| November 16 | 10 Oklahoma | 34 | 13 Baylor | 31 | Waco, Texas | McLane Stadium | | Chip Gaines, Joanna Gaines | Baylor |
| November 23 | 8 Penn State | 17 | 2 Ohio State | 28 | Columbus, Ohio | Outside St. John Arena | Rivalry | Eddie George | Ohio State |
| November 30 | 12 Wisconsin | 38 | 8 Minnesota | 17 | Minneapolis, Minnesota | Northrop Mall | Paul Bunyan's Axe | Eric Decker | Minnesota |
| December 7 | 4 Georgia | 10 | 2 LSU | 37 | Atlanta, Georgia | Georgia International Plaza | SEC Championship Game | Zac Brown | LSU |
| December 14 | Army | 7 | 23 Navy | 31 | Philadelphia, Pennsylvania | Outside Xfinity Live! | Army–Navy Game | Charles Barkley | Navy |
| December 28 | 3 Clemson | 29 | 2 Ohio State | 23 | Glendale, Arizona | State Farm Stadium | Fiesta Bowl – CFP Semifinal | | Ohio State |
| January 1, 2020 | 6 Oregon | 28 | 8 Wisconsin | 27 | Pasadena, California | | Rose Bowl | | |
| January 13, 2020 | 3 Clemson | 25 | 1 LSU | 42 | New Orleans, Louisiana | Jax Brewery | CFP National Championship | | LSU |
| April 23–25, 2020 | 2020 NFL draft | | | | Bristol, Connecticut | Pre-show from ESPN's Bristol studios (Note: No College GameDay was eventually held on that date. The show was originally going to be in Paradise, Nevada, but was moved to ESPN's studios due to the COVID-19 outbreak.) | | | |

== 2020 season ==
| Date | Visiting team | | Home team | | City | Location | Notes | Guest picker | Lee Corso headgear pick (Note: Corso made all of his headgear picks from his home in Florida and did not travel to any College GameDay locations due to COVID-19 concerns.) |
|---|---|---|---|---|---|---|---|---|---|
| August 29 | N/A (Note: Originally Navy vs. Notre Dame (Emerald Isle Classic) in Dublin, Ireland, but due to the ongoing COVID-19 pandemic, the game was then moved to Navy–Marine Corps Memorial Stadium for Labor Day weekend before ultimately being canceled; this would have been the first show to be broadcast outside of the United States.) | | | | | | | | |
| September 5 | None | | | | Bristol, Connecticut | ESPN's Bristol studios and remote locations | | | |
| September 12 | 1 Clemson | 37 | Wake Forest | 13 | Winston-Salem, North Carolina | Inside Truist Field at Wake Forest | | Chris Paul | Clemson |
| September 19 | 17 Miami (FL) | 47 | 18 Louisville | 34 | Louisville, Kentucky | Inside Cardinal Stadium | | Bill Murray | Miami (FL) |
| September 26 | Florida State | 10 | 12 Miami (FL) | 52 | Miami Gardens, Florida | Hard Rock Stadium | Rivalry | Stugotz | Miami (FL) |
| October 3 | 7 Auburn | 6 | 4 Georgia | 27 | Athens, Georgia | Sanford Stadium | Deep South's Oldest Rivalry | Omari Hardwick | Georgia |
| October 10 | 7 Miami (FL) | 17 | 1 Clemson | 42 | Clemson, South Carolina | Memorial Stadium | | Alex Rodriguez | Clemson |
| October 17 | 3 Georgia | 24 | 2 Alabama | 41 | Tuscaloosa, Alabama | Bryant–Denny Stadium | Rivalry | Derrick Henry | Alabama |
| October 24 | 18 Michigan | 49 | 21 Minnesota | 24 | Minneapolis, Minnesota | TCF Bank Stadium | Little Brown Jug | Vince Vaughn | Michigan |
| October 31 | 3 Ohio State | 38 | 18 Penn State | 25 | University Park, Pennsylvania | Beaver Stadium | Rivalry | Trace McSorley | Ohio State |
| November 7 | 1 Clemson | 40 | 4 Notre Dame | 47^{2OT} | South Bend, Indiana | Notre Dame Stadium | | Chase Claypool | Notre Dame |
| November 14 | 2020 Masters Tournament | | | | Augusta, Georgia | Augusta National Golf Club Par 3 course | | Jack Nicklaus | Brooks Koepka (Note: Corso's headgear was for who he thinks will win the Masters.) |
| November 21 | 14 Oklahoma State | 13 | 18 Oklahoma | 41 | Norman, Oklahoma | Gaylord Family Oklahoma Memorial Stadium | Bedlam Series | Trae Young | Oklahoma |
| November 28 | 22 Auburn | 13 | 1 Alabama | 42 | Tuscaloosa, Alabama | Magnolia Parking Deck | Iron Bowl | Joe Namath | Alabama |
| December 5 | 13 BYU | 17 | 18 Coastal Carolina | 22 | Conway, South Carolina | Brooks Stadium | Mormons vs. Mullets (Originally scheduled to be Liberty at Coastal Carolina) (Note: Because of an increased number of COVID-19 cases within the football program, Liberty University's medical staff decided to pause its football team's activities and cancel the game with Coastal Carolina in Conway, South Carolina, scheduled for December 5. BYU, who had not originally been scheduled to play that week, and had hopes of making the College Football Playoff, worked to schedule this game in its place.) | Dustin Johnson | BYU |
| December 12 | Navy | 0 | Army | 15 | West Point, New York | Lusk Reservoir Park | Army–Navy Game | Condoleezza Rice | Navy |
| December 19 | 3 Clemson | 34 | 2 Notre Dame | 10 | Charlotte, North Carolina | Bank of America Stadium | ACC Championship Game | Joel McHale | Clemson |
| January 1, 2021 | 3 Ohio State | 49 | 2 Clemson | 28 | New Orleans, Louisiana | | Sugar Bowl – CFP Semifinal | | Clemson |
| January 11, 2021 | 3 Ohio State | 24 | 1 Alabama | 52 | Miami Gardens, Florida | | CFP National Championship | | Ohio State |
| April 29–30, and May 1, 2021 | 2021 NFL draft | | | | Cleveland, Ohio | | Part of ESPN's entire NFL draft coverage | | |

== 2021 season ==
| Date | Visiting team | | Home team | | City | Location | Notes | Guest picker | Lee Corso headgear pick |
|---|---|---|---|---|---|---|---|---|---|
| August 28 | Alcorn State | 14 | North Carolina Central | 23 | Atlanta, Georgia | Center Parc Stadium | FCS; MEAC/SWAC Challenge | Eddie George | Alcorn State |
| September 4 | 5 Georgia | 10 | 3 Clemson | 3 | Charlotte, North Carolina | Romare Bearden Park | Duke's Mayo Classic; rivalry | Kane Brown | Georgia |
| September 11 | 10 Iowa | 27 | 9 Iowa State | 17 | Ames, Iowa | Between Sukup Endzone and Reimen Gardens | Cy–Hawk Trophy | Ashton Kutcher | Iowa |
| September 18 | 22 Auburn | 20 | 10 Penn State | 28 | University Park, Pennsylvania | Old Main Lawn | White Out game | Saquon Barkley | Penn State |
| September 25 | 12 Notre Dame | 41 | 18 Wisconsin | 13 | Chicago, Illinois | Soldier Field | Shamrock Series | Danica Patrick | Notre Dame |
| October 2 | 8 Arkansas | 0 | 2 Georgia | 37 | Athens, Georgia | Myers Quad | | Harris English | Georgia |
| October 9 | 6 Oklahoma | 55 | 21 Texas | 48 | Dallas, Texas | Texas State Fair | Red River Showdown | Mark Cuban | Texas |
| October 16 | 11 Kentucky | 13 | 1 Georgia | 30 | Athens, Georgia | Myers Quad | | Jeff Foxworthy | Georgia |
| October 23 | 10 Oregon | 34 | UCLA | 31 | Los Angeles, California (Note: Game was played in Pasadena, California) | Wilson Plaza | | Bill Walton | UCLA |
| October 30 | 6 Michigan | 33 | 8 Michigan State | 37 | East Lansing, Michigan | Ralph Young Field | Paul Bunyan Trophy | Ken Jeong | Michigan |
| November 6 | Tulsa | 20 | 6 Cincinnati | 28 | Cincinnati, Ohio | The Commons | | Nick Lachey | Cincinnati |
| November 13 | 11 Texas A&M | 19 | 15 Ole Miss | 29 | Oxford, Mississippi | The Grove | | Lane Kiffin | Ole Miss |
| November 20 | 7 Michigan State | 7 | 4 Ohio State | 56 | Columbus, Ohio | Outside St. John Arena | | Twenty One Pilots | Ohio State |
| November 27 | 2 Ohio State | 27 | 5 Michigan | 42 | Ann Arbor, Michigan | Pioneer High School | The Game | Sebastian Maniscalco | Ohio State |
| December 4 | 1 Georgia | 24 | 3 Alabama | 41 | Atlanta, Georgia | Georgia World Congress Center | SEC Championship Game; rivalry | Zac Brown | Alabama |
| December 11 | Army | 13 | Navy | 17 | East Rutherford, New Jersey | Outside MetLife Stadium (Lot J) | Army–Navy Game | Pete Dawkins | Navy |
| December 31 | 3 Georgia | 34 | 2 Michigan | 11 | Miami Gardens, Florida | Outside Hard Rock Stadium | Orange Bowl – CFP Semifinal | Bill Goldberg | Georgia |
| January 1, 2022 | 11 Utah | 45 | 6 Ohio State | 48 | Pasadena, California | Inside the Rose Bowl | Rose Bowl | | Ohio State |
| January 10, 2022 | 3 Georgia | 33 | 1 Alabama | 18 | Indianapolis, Indiana | Lucas Oil Stadium | CFP National Championship; rivalry | | Georgia |
| April 28–30, 2022 | 2022 NFL draft | | | | Las Vegas, Nevada | Caesars Forum | Part of ESPN's entire NFL draft coverage | | |

== 2022 season ==
| Date | Visiting team | | Home team | | City | Location | Notes | Guest picker | Lee Corso headgear pick |
|---|---|---|---|---|---|---|---|---|---|
| August 27 | None | | | | Bristol, Connecticut & Atlanta, Georgia | ESPN's Bristol studios and various remote locations | 2022 season preview | | |
| September 1 | West Virginia | 31 | 17 Pittsburgh | 38 | Pittsburgh, Pennsylvania | Acrisure Stadium | Backyard Brawl | | Pittsburgh |
| September 3 | 5 Notre Dame | 10 | 2 Ohio State | 21 | Columbus, Ohio | Outside St. John Arena | | Jack Harlow | Ohio State |
| September 10 | 1 Alabama | 20 | Texas | 19 | Austin, Texas | LBJ Lawn | | Glen Powell | Alabama |
| September 17 | Troy | 28 | Appalachian State | 32 | Boone, North Carolina | Sanford Mall | | Luke Combs | Appalachian State |
| September 24 | 20 Florida | 33 | 11 Tennessee | 38 | Knoxville, Tennessee | Ayres Hall | Rivalry | Bianca Belair | Tennessee |
| October 1 | 10 NC State | 20 | 5 Clemson | 30 | Clemson, South Carolina | Bowman Field | Textile Bowl | Christian Wilkins | Clemson |
| October 8 | 17 TCU | 38 | 19 Kansas | 31 | Lawrence, Kansas | The Hill | | Rob Riggle | None (Note: Corso was absent due to health issues.) |
| October 15 | 3 Alabama | 49 | 6 Tennessee | 52 | Knoxville, Tennessee | Ayres Hall | Third Saturday in October | Peyton Manning | Tennessee |
| October 22 | 9 UCLA | 30 | 10 Oregon | 45 | Eugene, Oregon | Memorial Quad | | Sabrina Ionescu | Oregon |
| October 29 | Southern | 0 | 5^{FCS} Jackson State | 35 | Jackson, Mississippi | Outside Veterans Memorial Stadium | FCS; rivalry | Stephen A. Smith | None |
| November 5 | 1 Tennessee | 13 | 3 Georgia | 27 | Athens, Georgia | Myers Quad | Rivalry | Luke Bryan | None |
| November 12 | 4 TCU | 17 | 18 Texas | 10 | Austin, Texas | LBJ Lawn | Rivalry | Jordan Spieth | None |
| November 19 | 14^{FCS} Montana | 21 | 3^{FCS} Montana State | 55 | Bozeman, Montana | Dyche Field | FCS; Brawl of the Wild | Nick Faldo | Montana State |
| November 26 | 3 Michigan | 45 | 2 Ohio State | 23 | Columbus, Ohio | Outside St. John Arena | The Game | A.J. Hawk | Ohio State |
| December 3 | 10 Kansas State | 31^{OT} | 3 TCU | 28 | Arlington, Texas | Outside AT&T Stadium | Big 12 Championship Game | LaDainian Tomlinson | Kansas State |
| December 31 | 4 Ohio State | 41 | 1 Georgia | 42 | Atlanta, Georgia | Mercedes-Benz Stadium | Peach Bowl – CFP Semifinal | | Ohio State |
| January 2, 2023 | 11 Penn State | 35 | 8 Utah | 21 | Pasadena, California | Inside the Rose Bowl | Rose Bowl | | Utah |
| January 9, 2023 | 3 TCU | 7 | 1 Georgia | 65 | Inglewood, California | SoFi Stadium | CFP National Championship | | TCU |
| April 27–29, 2023 | 2023 NFL draft | | | | Kansas City, Missouri | Union Station | Part of ESPN's entire NFL draft coverage | | |

== 2023 season ==
| Date | Visiting team | | Home team | | City | Location | Notes | Guest picker | Lee Corso headgear pick |
|---|---|---|---|---|---|---|---|---|---|
| August 26 | None | | | | Bristol, Connecticut | ESPN's Bristol studios | 2023 season preview | | |
| September 2 | 21 North Carolina | 31 | South Carolina | 17 | Charlotte, North Carolina | Romare Bearden Park | Duke's Mayo Classic; Battle of the Carolinas | Darius Rucker | North Carolina |
| September 9 | 11 Texas | 34 | 3 Alabama | 24 | Tuscaloosa, Alabama | Denny Chimes | Allstate Crossbar Classic | Joe Namath | Texas |
| September 16 | Colorado State | 35 | 18 Colorado | 43^{2OT} | Boulder, Colorado | Leeds School of Business Field | Rocky Mountain Showdown | Dwayne "The Rock" Johnson | Colorado |
| September 23 | 6 Ohio State | 17 | 9 Notre Dame | 14 | South Bend, Indiana | Library Lawn | | Vince Vaughn | Ohio State |
| September 30 | 11 Notre Dame | 21 | 17 Duke | 14 | Durham, North Carolina | Abele Quad | | Ken Jeong | Notre Dame |
| October 7 | 12 Oklahoma | 34 | 3 Texas | 30 | Dallas, Texas | Texas State Fair | Red River Rivalry | Baker Mayfield | Texas |
| October 14 | 8 Oregon | 33 | 7 Washington | 36 | Seattle, Washington | Red Square | Rivalry | Joel McHale | Washington |
| October 21 | 7 Penn State | 12 | 3 Ohio State | 20 | Columbus, Ohio | Outside St. John Arena | Rivalry | C. J. Stroud | Ohio State |
| October 28 | 8 Oregon | 35 | 13 Utah | 6 | Salt Lake City, Utah | Presidents Circle | | Steve Smith Sr. | None (Note: Corso was absent due to a family matter.) |
| November 4 | 14 LSU | 28 | 8 Alabama | 42 | Tuscaloosa, Alabama | Denny Chimes | Rivalry | Nate Bargatze | Alabama |
| November 11 | 9 Ole Miss | 17 | 2 Georgia | 52 | Athens, Georgia | Myers Quad | | Nolan Smith | Georgia |
| November 18 | Appalachian State | 26^{OT} | James Madison | 23 | Harrisonburg, Virginia | JMU Quad | Record crowd of 26,000 | PFT Commenter | James Madison |
| November 25 | 2 Ohio State | 24 | 3 Michigan | 30 | Ann Arbor, Michigan | Ferry Field | The Game | Aidan Hutchinson | Ohio State |
| December 2 | 1 Georgia | 24 | 8 Alabama | 27 | Atlanta, Georgia | Georgia World Congress Center – Building B | SEC Championship Game; rivalry | Theo Von | Georgia |
| December 9 | Army | 17 | Navy | 11 | Foxborough, Massachusetts | Outside Gillette Stadium | Army–Navy Game | Bill Belichick | Navy |
| January 1, 2024 | 4 Alabama | 20 | 1 Michigan | 27^{OT} | Pasadena, California | Inside the Rose Bowl | Rose Bowl – CFP Semifinal | | Michigan |
| January 8, 2024 | 2 Washington | 13 | 1 Michigan | 34 | Houston, Texas | NRG Stadium | CFP National Championship | | Michigan |
| April 25–26, 2024 | 2024 NFL draft | | | | Detroit, Michigan | Campus Martius Park | Part of ESPN's entire NFL draft coverage | None | |

== 2024 season ==
| Date | Visiting team | | Home team | | City | Location | Notes | Guest picker | Lee Corso headgear pick |
|---|---|---|---|---|---|---|---|---|---|
| August 24 | 10 Florida State | 21 | Georgia Tech | 24 | Dublin, Ireland | College Green | First show broadcast from outside the United States; Aer Lingus College Football Classic | Sheamus | None (Note: Corso did not travel to Ireland.) |
| August 31 | 7 Notre Dame | 23 | 20 Texas A&M | 13 | College Station, Texas | Aggie Park | | Johnny Manziel | Notre Dame |
| September 7 | 3 Texas | 31 | 10 Michigan | 12 | Ann Arbor, Michigan | Ferry Field | | Michael Phelps | Texas |
| September 14 | 16 LSU | 36 | South Carolina | 33 | Columbia, South Carolina | Gamecock Park | | Dawn Staley | LSU |
| September 21 | 6 Tennessee | 25 | 15 Oklahoma | 15 | Norman, Oklahoma | South Oval | | Blake Shelton | Tennessee |
| September 28 | 2 Georgia | 34 | 4 Alabama | 41 | Tuscaloosa, Alabama | Denny Chimes | Rivalry | Terry "Miss Terry" Saban | Alabama |
| October 5 | 8 Miami (FL) | 39 | California | 38 | Berkeley, California | Memorial Glade | | Marshawn Lynch | None |
| October 12 | 2 Ohio State | 31 | 3 Oregon | 32 | Eugene, Oregon | Memorial Quad | | Kaitlin Olson | None |
| October 19 | 5 Georgia | 30 | 1 Texas | 15 | Austin, Texas | South Mall | | Scottie Scheffler | Texas |
| October 26 | Washington | 17 | 13 Indiana | 31 | Bloomington, Indiana | Outside Memorial Stadium | | Kyle Schwarber | Indiana |
| November 2 | 4 Ohio State | 20 | 3 Penn State | 13 | University Park, Pennsylvania | Outside Bryce Jordan Center | Rivalry | Keegan-Michael Key | Ohio State |
| November 9 | 11 Alabama | 42 | 15 LSU | 13 | Baton Rouge, Louisiana | The Quad | Rivalry | Livvy Dunne & Paul Skenes | LSU |
| November 16 | 7 Tennessee | 17 | 12 Georgia | 31 | Athens, Georgia | Myers Quad | Rivalry | Cody Rhodes | Georgia |
| November 23 | 5 Indiana | 15 | 2 Ohio State | 38 | Columbus, Ohio | Outside St. John Arena | | Justin Fields | Indiana |
| November 30 | 3 Texas | 17 | 20 Texas A&M | 7 | College Station, Texas | Aggie Park | Rivalry | Dude Perfect | Texas |
| December 7 | 5 Georgia | 22^{OT} | 2 Texas | 19 | Atlanta, Georgia | Georgia World Congress Center – Building B | SEC Championship Game | Timothée Chalamet | None (Note: Corso was absent due to health issues, however, play-by-play announcer Chris Fowler confirmed during the game's broadcast that Corso had picked Texas to win.) |
| December 20 | 8 Indiana | 17 | 5 Notre Dame | 27 | South Bend, Indiana | Library Lawn | CFP First Round | Shane Gillis | None |
| December 21 | 7 Tennessee | 17 | 6 Ohio State | 42 | Columbus, Ohio | Outside St. John Arena | CFP First Round | A. J. Hawk | Ohio State |
| January 1, 2025 | 6 Ohio State | 41 | 1 Oregon | 21 | Pasadena, California | Inside the Rose Bowl | Rose Bowl – CFP Quarterfinal | | Ohio State |
| January 9, 2025 | 5 Notre Dame | 27 | 4 Penn State | 24 | Miami Gardens, Florida | Inside Hard Rock Stadium | Orange Bowl – CFP Semifinal | | Notre Dame |
| January 10, 2025 | 6 Ohio State | 28 | 3 Texas | 14 | Arlington, Texas | Inside AT&T Stadium | Cotton Bowl Classic – CFP Semifinal | | Texas |
| January 20, 2025 | 6 Ohio State | 34 | 5 Notre Dame | 23 | Atlanta, Georgia | Inside Mercedes-Benz Stadium | CFP National Championship | | Notre Dame |
| April 24–25, 2025 | 2025 NFL draft | | | | Green Bay, Wisconsin | Titletown District | Part of ESPN's entire NFL draft coverage | None | |

== 2025 season ==
| Date | Visiting team | | Home team | | City | Location | Notes | Guest picker | Lee Corso headgear pick |
|---|---|---|---|---|---|---|---|---|---|
| August 30 | 1 Texas | 7 | 3 Ohio State | 14 | Columbus, Ohio | Outside St. John Arena | Lee Corso's final appearance on the show | None | Ohio State |
| September 6 | 15 Michigan | 13 | 18 Oklahoma | 24 | Norman, Oklahoma | South Oval | | Trae Young | |
| September 13 | 6 Georgia | 44^{OT} | 15 Tennessee | 41 | Knoxville, Tennessee | Ayres Hall | Rivalry | Candace Parker | |
| September 20 | Florida | 7 | 4 Miami (FL) | 26 | Coral Gables, Florida | Lakeside Patio | Rivalry | Matthew Tkachuk | |
| September 27 | 6 Oregon | 30^{2OT} | 3 Penn State | 24 | University Park, Pennsylvania | Old Main Lawn | White Out game | LaVar Arrington | |
| October 4 | 16 Vanderbilt | 14 | 10 Alabama | 30 | Tuscaloosa, Alabama | Denny Chimes | | Theo Von | |
| October 11 | 7 Indiana | 30 | 3 Oregon | 20 | Eugene, Oregon | Memorial Quad | | Sabrina Ionescu | |
| October 18 | 5 Ole Miss | 35 | 9 Georgia | 43 | Athens, Georgia | Myers Quad | | Jelly Roll | |
| October 25 | 15 Missouri | 10 | 10 Vanderbilt | 17 | Nashville, Tennessee | Wyatt Lawn | | Nate Bargatze | |
| November 1 | 17 Cincinnati | 14 | 24 Utah | 45 | Salt Lake City, Utah | Presidents Circle | | Alex Smith | |
| November 8 | 7 BYU | 7 | 8 Texas Tech | 29 | Lubbock, Texas | Green Space west of Jones AT&T Stadium | | Patrick Mahomes | |
| November 15 | 9 Notre Dame | 37 | 22 Pittsburgh | 15 | Pittsburgh, Pennsylvania | North Shore Great Lawn | Rivalry | Aaron Donald | |
| November 22 | 15 USC | 27 | 7 Oregon | 42 | Eugene, Oregon | Memorial Quad | Rivalry | Marcus Mariota | |
| November 29 | 1 Ohio State | 27 | 15 Michigan | 9 | Ann Arbor, Michigan | Ferry Field | The Game | Aidan Hutchinson | |
| December 6 | 3 Georgia | 28 | 9 Alabama | 7 | Atlanta, Georgia | Georgia World Congress Center – Building C | SEC Championship Game; rivalry | Ernie Johnson | |
| December 19 | 9 Alabama | 34 | 8 Oklahoma | 24 | Norman, Oklahoma | South Oval | CFP First Round | Brian Bosworth | |
| December 20 | 10 Miami (FL) | 10 | 7 Texas A&M | 3 | College Station, Texas | Aggie Park | CFP First Round | Alex Caruso (Note: Johnny Manziel was originally scheduled as the guest picker.) | |
| January 1, 2026 | 9 Alabama | 3 | 1 Indiana | 38 | Pasadena, California | Inside the Rose Bowl | Rose Bowl – CFP Quarterfinal | | |
| January 8, 2026 | 10 Miami (FL) | 31 | 6 Ole Miss | 27 | Glendale, Arizona | Inside State Farm Stadium | Fiesta Bowl – CFP Semifinal | | |
| January 9, 2026 | 5 Oregon | 22 | 1 Indiana | 56 | Atlanta, Georgia | Inside Mercedes-Benz Stadium | Peach Bowl – CFP Semifinal | | |
| January 19, 2026 | 10 Miami (FL) | 21 | 1 Indiana | 27 | Miami Gardens, Florida | Inside Hard Rock Stadium | CFP National Championship | Marcus Freeman | |
| April 23–25, 2026 | 2026 NFL draft | | | | Pittsburgh, Pennsylvania | Outside Acrisure Stadium | Part of ESPN's entire NFL draft coverage | | |

== 2026 season ==
| Date | Visiting team | | Home team | | City | Location | Notes | Guest picker |
|---|---|---|---|---|---|---|---|---|
| September 5 | Clemson | 10 | 11 LSU | 51 | Baton Rouge, Louisiana | LSU Quad | College GameDay's 500th show on the road | Lainey Wilson |
| September 12 | 1 Ohio State | 23 | 4 Texas | 24 | Austin, Texas | LBJ Lawn | | Glen Powell |
| September 19 | 7 LSU | 24 | 8 Ole Miss | 32 | Oxford, Mississippi | The Grove | Magnolia Bowl | Morgan Freeman |
| September 26 | 1 Texas | 20 | 14 Tennessee | 17 | Knoxville, Tennessee | Outside Ayres Hall | | Johnny Knoxville |
| October 3 | 5 Ohio State | 31 | 14 Iowa | 14 | Iowa City, Iowa | Outside the Pentacrest | | Caitlin Clark |
| October 10 | 2 Georgia | 20 | 6 Alabama | 17 | Tuscaloosa, Alabama | Inside Coleman Coliseum (Note: The show was originally scheduled to be set in front of Denny Chimes, but was moved indoors due to Hurricane Isaias.) | Rivalry | Bryce Young |
| October 17 | 2 Notre Dame | 24 | 8 BYU | 28 | Provo, Utah | Lawn at Heritage Halls | | Steve Young |
| October 24 | 14 Houston | 13 | 10 Utah | 21 | Salt Lake City, Utah | Presidents Circle | | Dalton Kincaid |
| October 31 | Minnesota | 16 | 4 Indiana | 23^{OT} | Bloomington, Indiana | Next to Showalter Fountain | | Isiah Thomas |
| November 7 | 1 Miami (FL) | 24 | 11 Notre Dame | 31 | South Bend, Indiana | Library Lawn | | Jason Sudeikis |
| November 14 | Oregon State | 41 | 24 Boise State | 46 | Boise, Idaho | DeChevrieux Field | | Ian Johnson |
| November 21 | Virginia Tech | 20 | 7 Miami (FL) | 28 | Coral Gables, Florida | Lakeside Patio | Rivalry | Dwayne Johnson |
| November 28 | Duke | | Wake Forest | | Winston-Salem, North Carolina | | Rivalry | |
| December 5 | | | | | | | | |
| December 12 | Navy | | Army | | East Rutherford, New Jersey | Outside MetLife Stadium | Army–Navy Game | |
| December 18 | | | | | | | CFP First Round | |
| December 19 | | | | | | | CFP First Round | |
| January 1, 2027 | | | | | Pasadena, California | Inside the Rose Bowl | Rose Bowl – CFP Quarterfinal | |
| January 14, 2027 | | | | | Miami Gardens, Florida | Inside Hard Rock Stadium | Orange Bowl – CFP Semifinal | |
| January 15, 2027 | | | | | New Orleans, Louisiana | Inside Caesars Superdome | Sugar Bowl – CFP Semifinal | |
| January 25, 2027 | | | | | Paradise, Nevada | Inside Allegiant Stadium | CFP National Championship | |
| April 2027 | 2027 NFL draft | | | | Washington, D.C. | National Mall | Part of ESPN's entire NFL draft coverage | |

== Notes ==
Winners are listed in bold.

All rankings displayed for Division I-A/FBS teams are from the AP poll or CFP (starting in 2014) at the time of the game. Division I-AA/FCS rankings are from the STATS poll at the time of the game.
