= White Out (Penn State) =

College football event

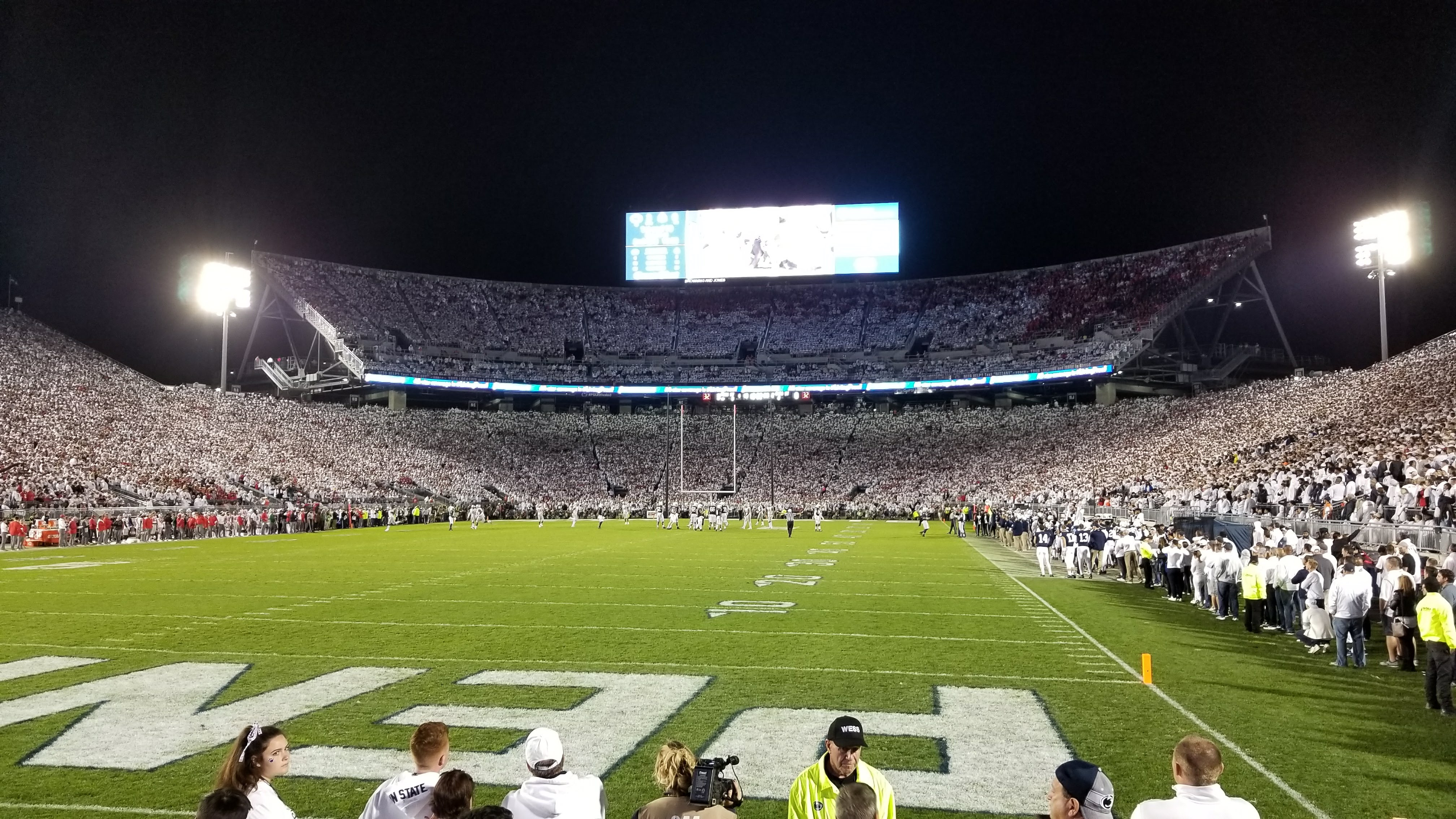
The White Out game against Ohio State in September 2018

The White Out is a tradition at the Pennsylvania State University during select Nittany Lions home football games, where home team spectators come dressed in white. It has been described as "the best atmosphere in college football." It is also among the most expensive regular season games of college football, with ticket prices ranging upwards of $250. All White Out games are showcased with an advanced fireworks display lining the east and west ends of Beaver Stadium.

During these games, Zombie Nation's "Kernkraft 400" is often played after a big play, and rapper Sheck Wes' "Mo Bamba" is normally played on the first defensive snap of the game.

As of 2025, Michigan has appeared in the most White Out games at six, with Ohio State in second, having appeared in five. Iowa is the only other team to have made multiple appearances, currently with two as of 2025. Eight other teams have each made a single appearance, of which only four were not members of the Big Ten Conference. The White Out is the football program's premier home event, and as such, it frequently touts some of Penn State's biggest rivalries, non-conference opponents, and highly rated recruiting opportunities.

== History ==
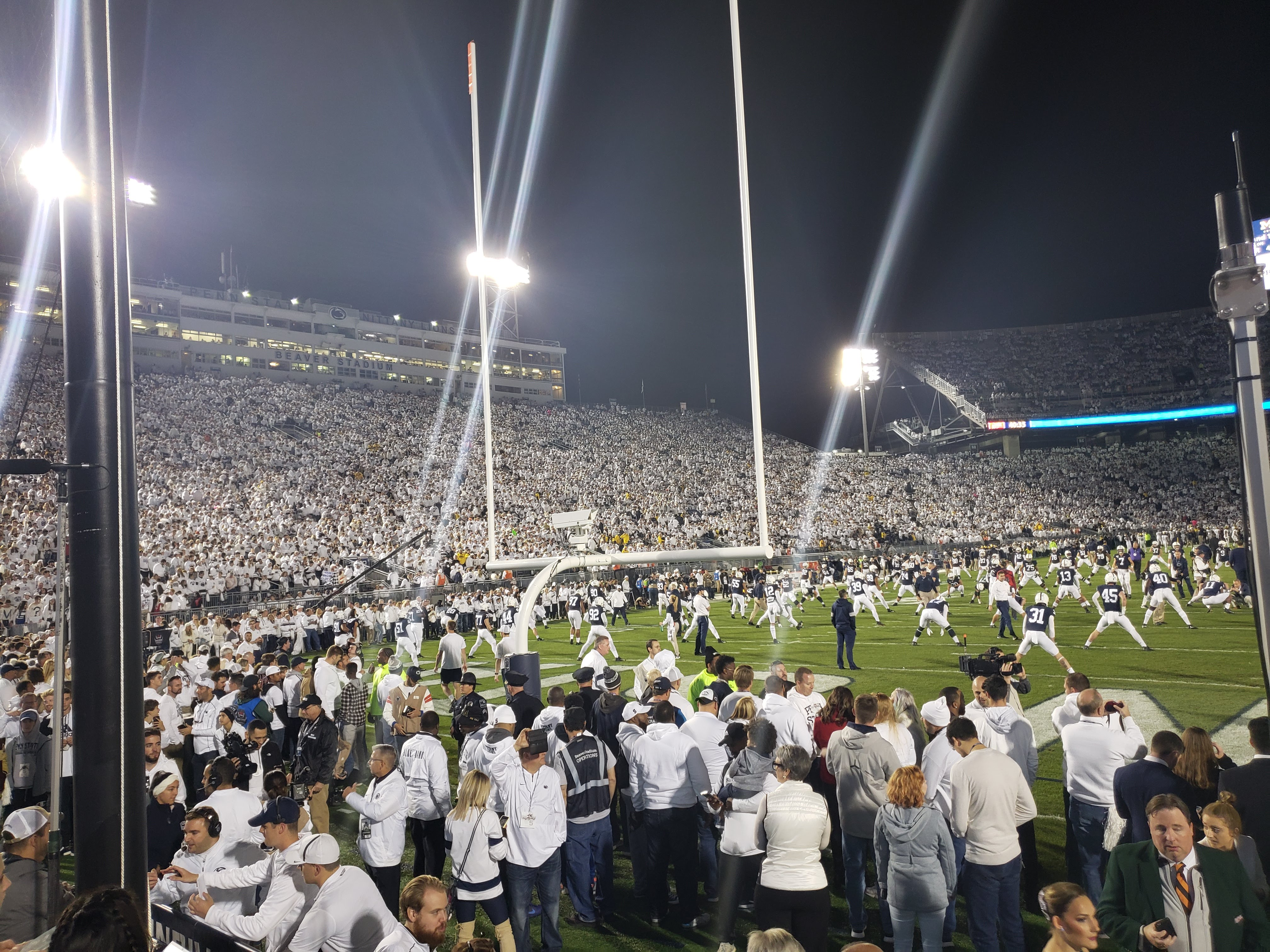
The 2019 White Out game against Michigan in October 2019

In 2002, leading up to a much anticipated game against Nebraska, there was a fear that a "Sea of Red" would overtake the stands in Beaver Stadium. An email began to be circulated amongst Penn State fans to both wear blue to the game and not to sell their tickets to Cornhusker fans. Dubbed "Operation Visine" (to "get the red out"), this precursor to the modern White Out worked, as there was not only record attendance, most of whom were Penn State fans, but the Nittany Lions upset #7 Nebraska 40–7.

In 2004, to try and draw extra excitement for the team in what was a down year for the program, the Penn State Athletic Department asked students to wear white to the upcoming game against Purdue. Over 20,000 students participated and, despite losing the game, it was deemed a success. Students were again asked to wear white to the following game against Iowa in what is considered to be one of the program's worst outings. Although the "wear white" participation was about the same as it was in the previous game, the crushing 6–4 loss resulted in a drop in popularity of the event. A final attempt was made for the final game of the season against Michigan State. This time, however, the Athletic Department decided to change strategy with a "Code Blue" dress code and extended it to all fans in the stadium. Students were sent from dorm to dorm to spread the word to maximize participation. Penn State won 37–13 thanks to a 28-point third quarter off the back of a plethora of Spartan interceptions. Despite finally getting a win, the Code Blue tradition did not stick and students went back to wearing white the following season. Even though the 2004 season had three games with dress codes, only the game against Purdue is counted as an official White Out.

The White Out would be cemented in 2005 with an upset win over rival Ohio State. The crowd was the second largest in Beaver Stadium history at the time, which many believe helped Penn State win.

For the 2007 game against Notre Dame, the all-white dress code would be officially extended to all spectators, not just the student section. This was the first of only three White Outs to feature a non-conference opponent, with the others being Alabama in 2011 and Auburn in 2021. From 2012 to 2019, the game alternated between Ohio State and Michigan. Initially, the Ohio State game in 2007 and the Michigan game in 2008 were considered official White Out games with the full stadium called a White House, but due to fan enthusiasm for participating in the White Out, these were retconned into official White Out games.

The Penn State Bookstore began selling official White Out shirts for the 2008 game, a tradition that holds to this day. The shirts are designed and chosen by students.

The 2013 and 2014 editions featured the only two White Outs to go to overtime. In 2013, Penn State upset 18th-ranked Michigan, 43–40. The Nittany Lions tied the game after a touchdown with only 27 seconds remaining, and the Wolverines missed a field goal short on the ensuing drive to end regulation. After both missing field goals in the first overtime and a matching pair in the second, Penn State fumbled the ball on the first play of the third. However, Michigan missed a potential game winning field goal on the following drive. The Wolverines opened the fourth overtime with a field goal, putting the pressure on the Nittany Lions. After a defensive pass interference call in the endzone, the ball was placed on the one-yard line. Penn State ran the ball for a touchdown on the next play to finish the game, making it the longest in Big Ten history. In 2014, Penn State lost to 12th-ranked Ohio State in double overtime, 31–24. Despite being predicted to get blown out prior to kickoff, the Nittany Lions played a tough, close game and led the Buckeyes in overtime. The loss is controversial, though, as many college football observers thought it was marred by questionable officiating, specifically citing two missed calls.

Perhaps the most influential White Out was Penn State's 24–21 upset win over No. 2 Ohio State in 2016, which is regarded by many as one of the best games in Penn State football history. The pivotal play, Grant Haley's blocked field goal return in the 4th quarter, was voted as the best Penn State play of the 21st century. The game's aftermath included fans storming the field at Beaver Stadium and celebratory riots in downtown State College. Their White Out rematch two years later, a 27–26 loss, would break the Beaver Stadium attendance record, edging out the previous record (the 2017 White Out against Michigan, a 42–13 victory) by less than 70 attendees.

The 2020 White Out was originally scheduled for October 24 against Ohio State. The game was rescheduled to October 31 when the Big Ten announced its updated conference-only schedule due to the COVID-19 pandemic. On August 6, Penn State announced that the Nittany Lions' season would begin with no fans in attendance at Beaver Stadium, casting doubt on the possibility of a White Out game in 2020. Fans ultimately were not allowed to attend any games, leading to the annual tradition being canceled for the first time since its inception. Despite the cancellation, the official 2020 White Out shirt was still sold by the Penn State Bookstore, making it a unique, novelty item of memorabilia.

The 2021 White Out game was against Auburn but a variation of the White Out involving a blue helmet stripe was used against Michigan, the Nittany Lions would lose that game 21–17.

In 2024, the White Out was against Washington officially but James Franklin called for "White Out energy" against ranked Illinois to create the same effect. This was due to fans being unhappy about the Washington game having lost its luster due to the team having multiple losses, and the likelihood of FOX making the rivalry game against Ohio State part of its Big Noon Kickoff lineup, which fans were unhappy about as many believe that the effect of the white out is diminished compared to an afternoon or evening game.

On December 21, 2024, Penn State held a daytime White Out against SMU for its first-ever home College Football Playoff game.

Although fans are dressed in white, Penn State always wears its traditional home blue uniforms for the game, while the visiting team wears white. Head coach James Franklin has explained that the team wears blue to create contrast, helping Penn State’s receivers stand out to quarterbacks against the sea of white-clad fans and opponents.

ESPN's College GameDay has attended six White Out games since the inception of the tradition. The 2005 season marked their first White Out visit, followed by the 2009 loss to Iowa. The show had been at every White Out between 2017 and 2019, and were among the first to try the Penn State Creamery's new "White Out" ice cream.

Penn State has only faced an unranked opponent for the White Out five times since its inception. These include Notre Dame in 2007, Iowa in 2009, Michigan in 2010, Minnesota in 2022, and Washington in 2024.

While traditionally played at night in prime time, there have been seven White Outs that have started during the day. These include matchups against Purdue in 2004, Notre Dame in 2007, Alabama in 2011, Ohio State in 2012, Michigan in 2013 and 2015, and the first-round playoff game against SMU in 2024. Penn State holds a 4–3 record in these games.

== Results ==
Season	Date	Time (ET)	Opponent		Penn State		Attendance
2004	October 9	4:30 p.m.	9 Purdue	20	Penn State	13	108,183
2005	October 8	7:45 p.m.	6 Ohio State	10	16 Penn State	17	109,839
2006	October 14	8:00 p.m.	4 Michigan	17	Penn State	10	110,007
2007	September 8	6:00 p.m.	Notre Dame	10	14 Penn State	31	110,078
2008	September 27	8:00 p.m.	22 Illinois	24	12 Penn State	31	109,626
2009	September 26	8:00 p.m.	Iowa	21	5 Penn State	10	109,316
2010	October 30	8:00 p.m.	Michigan	31	Penn State	41	108,539
2011	September 10	3:30 p.m.	3 Alabama	27	23 Penn State	11	107,846
2012	October 27	5:30 p.m.	9 Ohio State	35	Penn State	23	107,818
2013	October 12	5:00 p.m.	18 Michigan	40	Penn State	43^{4OT}	107,884
2014	October 25	8:00 p.m.	13 Ohio State	31^{2OT}	Penn State	24	107,895
2015	November 21	12:00 p.m.	14 Michigan	28	Penn State	16	107,418
2016	October 22	8:00 p.m.	2 Ohio State	21	Penn State	24	107,280
2017	October 21	7:30 p.m.	19 Michigan	13	2 Penn State	42	110,823
2018	September 29	7:30 p.m.	4 Ohio State	27	9 Penn State	26	110,889
2019	October 19	7:30 p.m.	16 Michigan	21	7 Penn State	28	110,669
2020	No White Out game due to COVID-19 pandemic						
2021	September 18	7:30 p.m.	22 Auburn	20	10 Penn State	28	109,958
2022	October 22	7:30 p.m.	Minnesota	17	16 Penn State	45	109,813
2023	September 23	7:30 p.m.	24 Iowa	0	7 Penn State	31	110,830
2024	November 9	8:00 p.m.	Washington	6	6 Penn State	35	110,233
2024	December 21	12:00 p.m.	11^{CFP} SMU	10	6^{CFP} Penn State	38	106,013
2025	September 27	7:30 p.m.	6 Oregon	30^{2OT}	3 Penn State	24	111,015
2026	October 10	7:30 p.m.	19 USC	31	Penn State	23	114,419
Penn State overall record: 13–10

== Similar events ==
- Since 1987, both the previous and current iterations of the National Hockey League's Winnipeg Jets have held a "White Out" for all home playoff games.
- In recent years, multiple NFL teams have held similar White Out-style events where fans are asked to dress in white. Since 2022, the Minnesota Vikings have held an annual "Winter Whiteout" game at U.S. Bank Stadium in December, where the Vikings wear a special all-white uniform combination to complement it. The Cincinnati Bengals, Green Bay Packers and Buffalo Bills have also held similar White Out–style events.
