= Grant Haley (American football) =

American football player (born 1996)

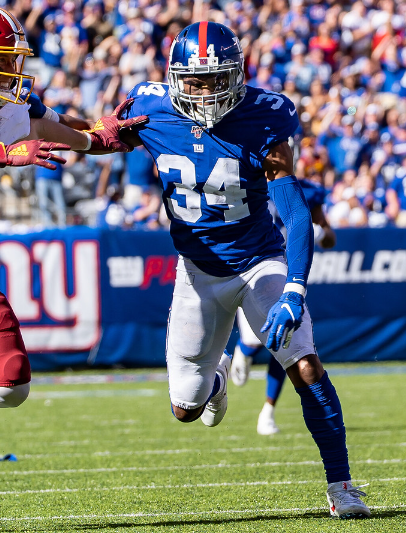
- Haley with the New York Giants in 2019

No. 34, 30, 46, 36
- Position: Cornerback

Personal information
- Born: January 6, 1996 (age 30); Atlanta, Georgia, U.S.
- Listed height: 5 ft 9 in (1.75 m)
- Listed weight: 190 lb (86 kg)

Career information
- High school: Lovett School (Atlanta)
- College: Penn State (2014–2017)
- NFL draft: 2018: undrafted

Career history
- New York Giants (2018–2019); New Orleans Saints (2020); Los Angeles Rams (2021–2022)

Awards and highlights
- Super Bowl champion (LVI)

Career NFL statistics
- Total tackles: 94
- Sacks: 1
- Pass deflections: 6
- Interceptions: 1
- Stats at Pro Football Reference

Grant Haley (born January 6, 1996) is an American former professional football player who was a cornerback in the National Football League (NFL). He played college football for the Penn State Nittany Lions. Haley is best known for returning the blocked field goal against the then undefeated Ohio State Buckeyes for a game-winning touchdown in 2016.

== Professional career ==
Pre-draft measurables
Height	Weight	Arm length	Hand span	40-yard dash	10-yard split	20-yard split	20-yard shuttle	Three-cone drill	Vertical jump	Broad jump	Bench press
5 ft 9 1/4 in (1.76 m)	190 lb (86 kg)	29 3/4 in (0.76 m)	9 1/8 in (0.23 m)	4.44 s	1.55 s	2.59 s	3.94 s	6.51 s	34 in (0.86 m)	9 ft 11 in (3.02 m)	15 reps
All values from NFL Combine

=== New York Giants ===
Following the 2018 NFL draft, Haley was signed by the New York Giants as an undrafted free agent. He saw snaps at cornerback and safety in his time with the Giants. He was waived on September 1, 2018, and was signed to the practice squad the next day. On October 16, 2018, he was signed to the active roster. Haley ended the 2018 season ranked as the 4th best rookie cornerback ranked by Pro Football Focus.

On September 5, 2020, Haley was waived by the Giants.

=== New Orleans Saints ===
On September 19, 2020, Haley was signed to the New Orleans Saints' practice squad. He was promoted to the active roster on December 5, 2020, but his contract was disapproved by the NFL on December 9, and he reverted to the practice squad. He was elevated to the active roster on January 2, 2021, for the team's week 17 game against the Carolina Panthers, and reverted to the practice squad after the game. During the game, Haley recorded his first career interception off a pass thrown by Teddy Bridgewater in the 33–7 win. On January 18, 2021, Haley signed a reserve/futures contract with the Saints.

On August 31, 2021, Haley was waived by the Saints.

=== Los Angeles Rams ===
On October 20, 2021, Haley was signed to the Los Angeles Rams practice squad. He was promoted to the active roster on January 8, 2022. Haley won the Super Bowl when the Rams defeated the Cincinnati Bengals.

On August 30, 2022, Haley was waived by the Rams and signed to the practice squad the next day. He was promoted to the active roster on September 24, 2022. He was placed on injured reserve on October 18, 2022.

== Personal life ==
Grant earned an undergraduate degree from Pennsylvania State University in 2017 and later earned Master of Business Administration from Kelley School of Business at Indiana University Bloomington in 2024.
