= Oregon–USC football rivalry =

American college football rivalry

- Oregon Ducks USC Trojans
- First meeting: November 8, 1915; Oregon, 34–0
- Latest meeting: September 26, 2026; Oregon, 41–27
- Next meeting: 2028
- Stadiums: Autzen Stadium; Los Angeles Memorial Coliseum

Statistics
- Total meetings: 65
- All-time series: USC leads, 38–25–2 (+1 Vacated Win)
- Largest victory: USC, 53–0 (1976)
- Longest win streak: USC, 8 (1920–38)
- Longest unbeaten streak: USC, 12 (1972–1986)
- Current win streak: Oregon, 5 (2019–present)

Locations of Oregon and USC

The Oregon–USC football rivalry is an American college football rivalry between the Oregon Ducks and the USC Trojans of the Big Ten Conference. Previously they both played in the Pac-12 Conference, before moving to the Big Ten Conference. Their respective campuses in Eugene and Los Angeles are 868 miles (1,395 km) apart, via Interstate 5. USC leads the series 38–25–2 as of 2026, with one vacated win on September 24, 2005.

== History ==
The two West Coast schools were conference opponents for over a century, originally members of the Pacific Coast Conference (PCC) from 1922 to 1958, before joining what would much later become the Pac-12 Conference from 1959 to 2023. On June 30, 2022, USC announced that they were invited to join the Big Ten Conference, and were scheduled to begin conference play in 2024. Over a year later, on August 4, 2023, Oregon announced that they too would make the move to the Big Ten, allowing this West Coast clash to transcend conferences once again.

== Notable games ==
Oregon won the first match between the two teams, in a dominant 34–0 victory over USC, lighting a fire under the Trojans, who would go on to win the next 8 matchups, with the streak ending in a tie on September 30, 1939. In their second ever matchup, USC and Oregon faced off on November 25, 1920, in Pasadena, California, with USC winning 21–0. Oregon, who at the time had the name “Oregon Webfoots”, was a member of the Pacific Coast Conference, USC was set to join, but remained Independent at the time of the matchup. Though the matchup was in Pasadena at Tournament Park, this wasn't the annual Rose Bowl Game. At the time, USC had frequently played games at Tournament Park between 1918 and 1921, up until the Rose Bowl Stadium was constructed in 1922, as well as the Los Angeles Memorial Coliseum a year afterwards in 1923.

On November 29, 1985, both USC and Oregon traveled to Tokyo, Japan, to face off in the ninth annual Mirage Bowl, where USC won 20–6. In the third quarter, USC Linebacker Rex Moore violently hit Oregon Quarterback Chris Miller after he had run out of bounds, drawing a personal foul. USC won the game despite untidy play. In a post game interview, USC head coach Ted Tollner said, “I’m pleased with the win, but I was disappointed with our execution in the second half when it got sloppy…”

In 2020, COVID-19 rocked the nation, and didn't spare College Football. During the shortened season, Oregon met USC on December 18, 2020, in the 2020 Pac-12 Football Championship Game. (The University of Washington was set to play in the matchup, yet failed to have enough scholarship athletes healthy to be able to participate.) Originally, the 2020 Pac-12 Championship was set to be held in Allegiant Stadium, in Las Vegas, Nevada, however, due to the ongoing pandemic, the game was played on USC's home field, Los Angeles Memorial Coliseum, where Oregon beat the Trojans 31–24, claiming their 2nd straight Pac-12 Championship, and their last out of 9 total.

November 22, 2025, was the first time that these two schools matched up in Big Ten conference play. ESPN's College Gameday broadcast live from Memorial Quad. The Ducks won 42–27 over the Trojans. On September 26 that year, the Big Ten launched their new Rivalry Series (Presented by Venmo), in which it listed USC at Oregon as one of the rivalry matchups, finally acknowledging, and recognizing the long fought, ongoing feud between Oregon and USC for West Coast dominance.

On September 26th, 2026, the two teams met for a top 20 showdown to open Big Ten play in the Los Angeles Memorial Coliseum. With USC leading 7–3, Oregon quarterback Dante Moore was knocked out by a late, dirty hit while sliding from USC LB Desman Stephens II early in the 2nd quarter. Stephens II received a 15-yard targeting penalty and was thereby ejected from the game. The controversy grew as Stephens taunted the Oregon sideline as Moore laid motionless on the ground for what was reported as 8 minutes. Media showed Stephens II laughing and high fiving teammates while Moore was attended to by medical staff. Oregon rallied behind backup QB Dylan Raiola, as Oregon would go on to win 41–27. It was Oregon's 5th straight win vs the Trojans, the longest the Ducks have had in the series history. After the game, USC would give Stephens II a 1 game suspension for his hit on Moore, drawing more controversy, as many members of the media saw it to be too short or lenient. Paul Finebaum referred to the suspension's leniency as "an utter disgrace" on First Take the following Monday, with Stephen A. Smith agreeing, referring to the suspension as "too short", and calling for "a more severe punishment".

== Media coverage ==
Despite this rivalry only now getting coverage once again, this matchup between the Trojans and the Ducks has been talked about for quite some time. "USC vs. Oregon is perhaps one of the best new rivalries in college football..." Chris Anderson, a journalist for Bleacher Report wrote in 2011. "It pits former Pac-10 dynasty—USC—against the Pac-12's rising powerhouse—Oregon—in a battle that will decide the Pac-12 conference title this year as well as Pac-12 titles in the foreseeable future." "Though unconventional rivals," Anderson later mentions, "whenever Oregon and USC are playing against one another, expect to see plenty of tension and bitterness expressed on the field."

Austin Green wrote in a live article for The Athletic, "Today, we’ll be bringing you everything you need to know about Week 13's only ranked matchup — No. 15 USC at No. 7 Oregon. That‘s right, it’s an old Pac-12 rivalry renewed in the Big Ten with massive College Football Playoff implications in store." This live article continues on to mention the history between the two teams, after being adversaries for so long. "Unlike the case with most of their new opponents in the expanded Big Ten, [USC and Oregon] have plenty of familiarity with each other thanks to their history as rivals in the old Pac-12." A week or so earlier, Kyron Samuels hyped up the upcoming face-off in an article for Sports Illustrated writing, "The No. 8-ranked Oregon Ducks will host the No. 17 USC Trojans in Eugene in what is a matchup that meets every criterion for college football madness. A legacy rivalry, playoff stakes, NFL draft stock, legendary coaching matchup, and as good a home-field environment as anyone could ask for in football."

== Game results ==
Oregon victories	USC victories	Tie games

No.	Date	Location	Winning team		Losing team	
1	November 8, 1915	Los Angeles, CA	Oregon	34	USC	0
2	November 25, 1920	Pasadena, CA	USC	21	Oregon	0
3	October 17, 1931	Los Angeles, CA	USC	53	Oregon	0
4	November 12, 1932	Los Angeles, CA	USC	33	Oregon	0
5	November 18, 1933	Los Angeles, CA	USC	26	Oregon	0
6	November 17, 1934	Los Angeles, CA	USC	33	Oregon	0
7	October 3, 1936	Los Angeles, CA	USC	26	Oregon	0
8	October 16, 1937	Los Angeles, CA	USC	34	Oregon	14
9	October 29, 1938	Eugene, OR	#19 USC	31	Oregon	7
10	September 30, 1939	Los Angeles, CA	Tie	7	Tie	7
11	October 19, 1940	Los Angeles, CA	#17 USC	13	Oregon	0
12	October 11, 1941	Los Angeles, CA	Oregon	20	USC	6
13	November 14, 1942	Los Angeles, CA	USC	40	Oregon	0
14	November 2, 1946	Los Angeles, CA	USC	43	Oregon	0
15	October 16, 1948	Portland, OR	Oregon	20	USC	6
16	October 22, 1949	Los Angeles, CA	#19 USC	40	Oregon	13
17	October 28, 1950	Los Angeles, CA	USC	30	Oregon	21
18	October 31, 1953	Portland, OR	Oregon	13	#7 USC	7
19	October 16, 1954	Portland, OR	USC	24	Oregon	14
20	September 23, 1955	Los Angeles, CA	#9 USC	42	Oregon	15
21	November 17, 1956	Portland, OR	Oregon	7	#14 USC	0
22	November 16, 1957	Los Angeles, CA	#16 Oregon	16	USC	7
23	October 11, 1958	Portland, OR	#15 Oregon	25	USC	0
24	October 28, 1967	Los Angeles, CA	#1 USC	28	Oregon	6
25	November 2, 1968	Eugene, OR	#1 USC	20	Oregon	13
26	October 24, 1970	Eugene, OR	Oregon	10	#10 USC	7
27	October 9, 1971	Los Angeles, CA	Oregon	28	USC	23
28	October 28, 1972	Eugene, OR	#1 USC	18	Oregon	0
29	October 20, 1973	Los Angeles, CA	#6 USC	31	Oregon	10
30	October 19, 1974	Eugene, OR	#6 USC	16	Oregon	7
31	October 18, 1975	Los Angeles, CA	#3 USC	17	Oregon	3
32	September 18, 1976	Eugene, OR	USC	53	Oregon	0
33	October 15, 1977	Los Angeles, CA	#6 USC	33	Oregon	15
34	September 16, 1978	Eugene, OR	#8 USC	37	Oregon	10

No.	Date	Location	Winning team		Losing team	
35	October 18, 1980	Eugene, OR	Tie	7	Tie	7
36	October 2, 1982	Los Angeles, CA	#16 USC	38	Oregon	7
37	October 13, 1984	Eugene, OR	USC	19	Oregon	9
38	November 29, 1985	Tokyo, Japan	USC	20	Oregon	6
39	October 4, 1986	Los Angeles, CA	#9 USC	35	Oregon	21
40	October 10, 1987	Eugene, OR	Oregon	34	USC	27
41	October 8, 1988	Los Angeles, CA	#3 USC	42	#18 Oregon	14
42	September 28, 1991	Eugene, OR	USC	30	Oregon	14
43	October 10, 1992	Los Angeles, CA	#20 USC	32	Oregon	10
44	October 9, 1993	Eugene, OR	USC	24	Oregon	13
45	October 1, 1994	Los Angeles, CA	Oregon	22	#19 USC	7
46	October 25, 1997	Los Angeles, CA	USC	24	Oregon	22
47	October 24, 1998	Eugene, OR	#12 Oregon	17	USC	13
48	September 25, 1999	Eugene, OR	Oregon	33	#16 USC	30^{3OT}
49	October 14, 2000	Los Angeles, CA	#9 Oregon	28	USC	17
50	September 22, 2001	Eugene, OR	#7 Oregon	24	USC	22
51	October 26, 2002	Eugene, OR	#15 USC	44	#14 Oregon	33
52	September 24, 2005	Eugene, OR	#1 USC^{†}	45	#24 Oregon	13
53	November 11, 2006	Los Angeles, CA	#7 USC	35	#21 Oregon	10
54	October 27, 2007	Eugene, OR	#5 Oregon	24	#9 USC	17
55	October 4, 2008	Los Angeles, CA	#9 USC	44	#23 Oregon	10
56	October 31, 2009	Eugene, OR	#10 Oregon	47	#5 USC	20
57	October 30, 2010	Los Angeles, CA	#1 Oregon	53	#24 USC	32
58	November 19, 2011	Eugene, OR	#18 USC	38	#4 Oregon	35
59	November 3, 2012	Los Angeles, CA	#2 Oregon	62	#18 USC	51
60	November 21, 2015	Eugene, OR	#23 Oregon	48	#24 USC	28
61	November 5, 2016	Los Angeles, CA	USC	45	Oregon	20
62	November 2, 2019	Los Angeles, CA	#7 Oregon	56	USC	24
63	December 18, 2020	Los Angeles, CA	Oregon	31	#13 USC	24
64	November 11, 2023	Eugene, OR	#6 Oregon	36	USC	27
65	November 22, 2025	Eugene, OR	#7 Oregon	42	#15 USC	27
66	September 26, 2026	Los Angeles, CA	#20 Oregon	41	#12 USC	27
Series: USC leads 38–25–2
† USC vacated this win after NCAA sanctions

== Coaching records since 1915 ==
=== USC ===
Head coach	Team	Games	Seasons	Wins	Losses	Ties	Pct.
Ralph Glaze	USC	1	1915	0	1	0	.000
Gus Henderson	USC	1	1920	1	1	0	1.000
Howard Jones	USC	9	1925-1940	8	0	1	.944
Sam Barry	USC	1	1941	0	1	0	.000
Jeff Cravath	USC	5	1942–50	4	1	0	.800
Jess Hill	USC	4	1953–56	2	2	0	.500
Don Clark	USC	2	1957–59	0	2	0	.000
John McKay	USC	8	1967–75	6	2	0	.750
John Robinson	USC	9	1976–82--1993-97	6	2	1	.750
Ted Tollner	USC	3	1983-86	3	0	0	1.000
Larry Smith	USC	4	1987–92	1	3	0	.250
Paul Hackett	USC	3	1998–2000	0	3		.000
Pete Carroll	USC	6	2001–09	3	3		.500
Lane Kiffin	USC	3	2010–12	1	2		.333
Clay Helton	USC	4	2015–20	1	3		.250
Lincoln Riley	USC	3	2023–26	0	3		.000

=== Oregon ===
Head coach	Team	Games	Seasons	Wins	Losses	Ties	Pct.
Hugo Bezdek	Oregon	1	1915	1	0	0	1.000
Tex Oliver	Oregon	6	1938–46	1	4	1	.250
Jim Aiken	Oregon	3	1947–50	1	2	0	.333
Len Casanova	Oregon	6	1951–66	4	2	0	.667
Jerry Frei	Oregon	4	1967–71	2	2	0	.500
Dick Enright	Oregon	2	1972–73	0	2	0	.000
Don Read	Oregon	3	1974–76	0	3	0	.000
Rich Brooks	Oregon	11	1980–94	2	8	1	.227
Mike Bellotti	Oregon	9	1997–2008	5	4		.556
Chip Kelly	Oregon	4	2009–12	3	1		1.000
Mark Helfrich	Oregon	2	2015–16	1	1		.500
Mario Cristobal	Oregon	2	2019–20	2	0		1.000
Dan Lanning	Oregon	3	2023–26	3	0		1.000

Game results sources:

== See also ==
- List of NCAA college football rivalry games
