= Ohio State–Penn State football rivalry =

American college football

- Ohio State Buckeyes Penn State Nittany Lions
- First meeting: November 16, 1912; Penn State, 37–0
- Latest meeting: November 1, 2025; Ohio State, 38–14
- Next meeting: 2028
- Stadiums: Ohio State: Ohio Stadium; Penn State: Beaver Stadium

Statistics
- Total meetings: 41
- All-time series: Ohio State: 26–14
- Largest victory: Ohio State: 63–14 (2013); Penn State: 63–14 (1994)
- Longest win streak: Ohio State: 9 (2017–present)
- Current win streak: Ohio State: 9 (2017–present)

Locations of Ohio State and Penn State

The Ohio State–Penn State football rivalry is an American college football rivalry between the Ohio State Buckeyes and the Penn State Nittany Lions. Ohio State leads the series 26–14.

The programs met eight times prior to the 1993 season when Penn State joined the Big Ten Conference. From 1993 through 2023, the teams played annually as a "protected rivalry" from 1993 to 2010, and as a divisional matchup from 2011 to 2023. This was not included as a protected rivalry when the Big Ten expanded in 2024; the teams will now meet at least twice in a five-year cycle.

The rivalry is marked by several memorable games, including Penn State’s blocked field goal return for a touchdown in 2016 and Ohio State’s fourth quarter comebacks in 2017 and 2018. Due to frequency of both teams being ranked when they meet, the rivalry is the most common matchup featured on ESPN's College Gameday, as the show has aired from either Columbus or State College for a record 13 times.

== 1912–1980: Pre-Big Ten era ==
Penn State won the first four meetings in the series, however the games were scheduled intermittently between 1912 and 1964. The first ever match-up was held in Columbus, Ohio in November 1912. Penn State, coming off an 8–0–1 season in 1911, shut out Ohio State, 37–0. The game is officially recorded as a forfeit by Ohio State. The first contest held in State College, Pennsylvania was in 1976 where Ohio State beat Penn State, 12–7.

In 1980, the two schools played in their first and only postseason bowl, the 1980 Fiesta Bowl. Ohio State's record was 9–3, and Penn State's 10–2. Penn State won, 31–19, at Sun Devil Stadium in Tempe, Arizona. Following the game, Penn State and Ohio State did not meet again until Penn State joined the Big Ten in 1993

== 1993–2000: Penn State enters the Big Ten ==
Following the Nittany Lions joining the Big Ten, the two programs met as conference foes for the first time on October 30, 1993, in Columbus. The No. 3 Buckeyes defeated the No. 12 Nittany Lions 24–6. For the following six matchups, at both teams were rated in the top 25 of the AP Poll each year, with at least one team in the top five. In 1996, the Associated Press compared the newly minted rivalry to The Game between Harvard and Yale when speaking of the magnitude, and also saying it had developed into one of the country's biggest rivalries in just six years.

Due to the competitive nature of the games, both teams began to realize that there was uniqueness in the matchup. After only three years in the Big Ten, Buckeye players were already comparing the game to the Michigan–Ohio State football rivalry, with a player saying "Penn State's right up there with Michigan. It's definitely one of our biggest games. You can sense there was a rivalry from day one."

When the Buckeyes lost two games before meeting Penn State in 1999, one Lions player said, "It's Penn State-Ohio State. Records don't matter."

== 2001–2010: Paterno vs. Tressel ==
The 2000s saw several close games between the Buckeyes and the Nittany Lions, as they put long time Penn State head coach Joe Paterno, against Ohio State head coach Jim Tressel. Ohio State went 6–3 during this period. What would have been the Buckeyes' seventh win in 2010, along with that entire season, was vacated as a result of players receiving improper benefits. Ohio State won seven Big Ten titles, either shared or outright, in 2002 and 2005 through 2010, although Ohio State vacated the 2010 title due to improper player benefits. Penn State shared titles in 2005 and 2008 with Ohio State.

The 2001 game gave Paterno his 324th career win and the record for most wins by a coach in NCAA history. Penn State was suffering through a dismal season with a 1–4 start with Matt Senaca leading the way. Senaca was soon benched in this game where Ohio State climbed to a 27–9 lead and freshman Zack Mills helped Penn State come back and nearly saved their season (Penn State finished 5–6). The following year, Penn State would very nearly beat Ohio State in the Horseshoe, only losing 13–7 to the eventual national champions.

In 2005, Penn State was an underdog despite trouncing then-No. 18 Minnesota 44–14 the week before and being undefeated. However, Penn State played defense and shut down the Buckeye ground game. With the help of a loud and boisterous home crowd, Penn State upset the then-favored Buckeyes 17–10 in State College. The noise level of the stadium as a factor in Ohio State's defeat gained national attention and respect for the Penn State student section, giving birth to the "Whiteout" tradition at Beaver Stadium. The following year, the Lions were able to get on the board first and maintained a 3–0 lead at halftime. Penn State fumbled while driving for another score in the third quarter and, after a missed Penn State field goal that would have given the Lions a 6–0 lead, the Buckeyes were able to score the game's first touchdown and gain a 7–3 advantage going into the 4th quarter. Ohio State went up 14–3 when QB Troy Smith, attempting to avoid a sack, threw downfield into coverage. Wide Receiver Brian Robiskie was able to catch the pass and avert a Penn State interception. On the next drive Penn State, starting from its own 20, was able to take the ball to the Ohio State 1-yard line before being pushed back and kicking a field goal to cut the OSU lead to 8. Ohio State was able to score twice in the final two minutes of the game on a pair of interceptions thrown by Penn State QB Anthony Morelli that were returned for touchdowns to secure a 28–6 victory.

Ohio State entered the 2007 edition at Happy Valley undefeated and ranked #1 in the country. Despite the loud Penn State "whiteout" planned by the Lions' student section, the Buckeyes were able to overcome an early 7–3 deficit to win 37–17. The 2008 meeting saw Penn State prevail 13–6 at Ohio Stadium, snapping a seven-game losing streak in the Shoe. The Buckeyes would win in 2009 and 2010, going on to win the Big Ten title each year, but the 2010 victory was later vacated.

== 2011: Rivalry hit by scandal ==
After the 2010 season, it was revealed that several Ohio State players, most notably QB Terrelle Pryor, received improper benefits. An investigation determined that Tressel had knowledge of the situation but failed to notify the University or the NCAA. Tressel resigned his position and Ohio State vacated all of its wins from the season, including its win over Penn State, its Big Ten Title, and Sugar Bowl win.

The 2011 season began a new era in the rivalry with new additions to the Big Ten conference, as well as new head coaches for both teams. With the addition of Nebraska into the Big Ten, the conference split into two six-team divisions. Both Ohio State and Penn State were placed in the "Leaders" Division and would continue to play each other annually. The 2011 season also marked a new era for the Buckeyes and Nittany Lions, as Luke Fickell was named the interim head coach for the season after Tressel's resignation and Tom Bradley after longtime Penn State head coach Joe Paterno was fired 9 games into the season following the uncovering of the Penn State child sex abuse scandal (Paterno died shortly thereafter on January 22, 2012). Both schools were ultimately handed postseason bans for the 2012 season (Penn State's ban was slated to extend through 2015; it was lifted on September 8, 2014). Ohio State vacated its wins from the 2010 season, while Penn State was forced to vacate all of its wins from 1998 to 2011 (although these wins were later restored in 2015).

== 2012–2018: Two fresh starts ==
Both schools had new head coaches for the 2012 season. On November 28, 2011, Ohio State hired former Utah and Florida head coach Urban Meyer as head coach, beginning a new era in the rivalry. Meyer had been considered by many, including Paterno himself, as a possible replacement for Paterno at Penn State. Penn State eventually hired former New England Patriots offensive coordinator Bill O'Brien to succeed Paterno as head coach.

The O'Brien Era at Penn State lasted only two seasons, as he was hired as to be the head coach of the NFL's Houston Texans in 2014. O'Brien's Lions lost twice to the Buckeyes, with the 63–14 result in 2013 representing Penn State's worst loss, and most points scored against the team, since 1899. O'Brien was replaced by former Vanderbilt head coach James Franklin in January 2014. Ohio State won in Franklin's first two seasons, but in 2016, a blocked punt and blocked field goal helped Penn State upset the #2 ranked Buckeyes, 24–21. Penn State would go on to win the conference championship. In 2017, the sixth-ranked Buckeyes hosted #2 Penn State. The Nittany Lions came into the game with best scoring defense in the country, allowing only 9.6 points per game, against an Ohio State team that led the Big 10 in scoring. Ultimately the Buckeyes overcame a 28–10 deficit to win, 39–38, scoring the winning touchdown with 1:48 in the game. In 2018, #4 Ohio State rallied from a 26–14 deficit to defeat #9 Penn State, 27–26. The loss ended Penn State's 16-game home winning streak.

Meyer retired from Ohio State in January 2019. Buckeyes offensive coordinator Ryan Day was announced as the next head coach. #2 Ohio State defeated #8 Penn State, 28–17, in Day's first game coaching against Penn State. The win clinched the Big Ten East Division for the Buckeyes for the 3rd straight year.

== 2019–present: Ohio State dominance ==
While James Franklin was head coach at Penn State, Ohio State continued their dominance in the rivalry during recent years, winning eight straight since 2017 and 12 of the last 13 matchups.

Although Ohio State has pulled out the victory every year since to hiring of Ryan Day, games between the two teams have often been close, and both teams have been ranked going into the matchup. In 2022, the game in Happy Valley was 16-14 Ohio State heading into the fourth quarter until an early fourth quarter touchdown by the Nittany Lions gave them a 21-16 lead. However, Ohio State would score 28 points in the final nine minutes of the game to win 44-31, handing Penn State their sixth straight loss of the rivalry. The Buckeyes won on a big performance by JT Tuimoloau, who had a strip sack and a pick six in the fourth quarter alone. The following year, the Nittany Lions marched into Columbus hoping to snap their losing streak. However, a defensive grind ended in another Buckeye victory, this time 20-12.

The 2024 matchup in Happy Valley was the second top five matchup between the teams in the history of the rivalry, with the other coming in 1996. It was also the first time since 2017 and the first time in the Day era that the Nittany Lions entered the game ranked higher than the Buckeyes, as they were ranked #3 compared to Ohio State's #4 ranking. A field goal and a pick six by Zion Tracy in the first quarter would jump Penn State to an early 10-0 lead, giving hope to Nittany Lions fans that they could pull off the victory. However, the game would be another defensive battle, as Ohio State would take a 14-10 lead into the half, and would make a crucial goal line stand in the fourth to keep the game at 20-13 Buckeyes. Ohio State would run out the rest of the clock, breaking the heart of Penn State fans for the eighth straight year. It would end up being James Franklin's final game against the Buckeyes as Penn State's head coach, as Franklin would be fired the following season before the teams met. Franklin finished 1-10 against the Buckeyes while at the helm of the Nittany Lions, losing his last eight. The game also recorded the largest crowd in Beaver Stadium's history, at 111,030.

The rivalry had some juice added when, after helping lead the Buckeyes to the 2024 National Championship with a spectacular defense, defensive coordinator Jim Knowles left the Buckeyes for Happy Valley, becoming the highest paid coordinator in college football. The two teams met on November 1, 2025, with Terry Smith as the interim coach following James Franklin's dismissal. Ohio State would once again win, final score of 38-14, their ninth straight victory over Penn State and their largest margin of victory in the rivalry game since 2015. With the Big Ten Conference realignment that eliminated divisions starting in 2024, the game was not deemed a protected rivalry, meaning that 2026 will be the first year that the two teams would not play since 1992. Their next scheduled meeting will occur in 2028 in State College.

== Game results ==
Ohio State victories	Penn State victories	Vacated wins

No.	Date	Location	Winning team		Losing team	
1	November 16, 1912	Columbus, OH	Penn State	37	Ohio State	0
2	October 20, 1956	Columbus, OH	Penn State	7	#5 Ohio State	6
3	November 9, 1963	Columbus, OH	Penn State	10	#10 Ohio State	7
4	November 7, 1964	Columbus, OH	Penn State	27	#2 Ohio State	0
5	September 20, 1975	Columbus, OH	#3 Ohio State	17	#7 Penn State	9
6	September 18, 1976	State College, PA	#2 Ohio State	12	#7 Penn State	7
7	September 16, 1978	Columbus, OH	#5 Penn State	19	#6 Ohio State	0
8	December 26, 1980	Tempe, AZ	#10 Penn State	31	#11 Ohio State	19
9	October 30, 1993	Columbus, OH	#3 Ohio State	24	#12 Penn State	6
10	October 29, 1994	State College, PA	#1 Penn State	63	#21 Ohio State	14
11	October 7, 1995	State College, PA	#5 Ohio State	28	#12 Penn State	25
12	October 5, 1996	Columbus, OH	#3 Ohio State	38	#4 Penn State	7
13	October 11, 1997	State College, PA	#2 Penn State	31	#7 Ohio State	27
14	October 3, 1998	Columbus, OH	#1 Ohio State	28	#7 Penn State	9
15	October 16, 1999	State College, PA	#2 Penn State	23	#18 Ohio State	10
16	September 23, 2000	Columbus, OH	#14 Ohio State	45	Penn State	6
17	October 27, 2001	State College, PA	Penn State	29	Ohio State	27
18	October 26, 2002	Columbus, OH	#4 Ohio State	13	#18 Penn State	7
19	November 1, 2003	State College, PA	#8 Ohio State	21	Penn State	20
20	October 30, 2004	Columbus, OH	Ohio State	21	Penn State	10
21	October 8, 2005	State College, PA	#16 Penn State	17	#6 Ohio State	10
22	September 23, 2006	Columbus, OH	#1 Ohio State	28	#24 Penn State	6

No.	Date	Location	Winning team		Losing team	
23	October 27, 2007	State College, PA	#1 Ohio State	37	#24 Penn State	17
24	October 25, 2008	Columbus, OH	#3 Penn State	13	#10 Ohio State	6
25	November 7, 2009	State College, PA	#12 Ohio State	24	#11 Penn State	7
26	November 13, 2010	Columbus, OH	#7 Ohio State^{†}	38	Penn State	14
27	November 19, 2011	Columbus, OH	#21 Penn State	20	Ohio State	14
28	October 27, 2012	State College, PA	#9 Ohio State	35	Penn State	23
29	October 26, 2013	Columbus, OH	#4 Ohio State	63	Penn State	14
30	October 25, 2014	State College, PA	#12 Ohio State	31	Penn State	24
31	October 17, 2015	Columbus, OH	#1 Ohio State	38	Penn State	10
32	October 22, 2016	State College, PA	Penn State	24	#2 Ohio State	21
33	October 28, 2017	Columbus, OH	#6 Ohio State	39	#2 Penn State	38
34	September 29, 2018	State College, PA	#4 Ohio State	27	#9 Penn State	26
35	November 23, 2019	Columbus, OH	#2 Ohio State	28	#8 Penn State	17
36	October 31, 2020	State College, PA	#3 Ohio State	38	#18 Penn State	25
37	October 30, 2021	Columbus, OH	#5 Ohio State	33	#20 Penn State	24
38	October 29, 2022	State College, PA	#2 Ohio State	44	#13 Penn State	31
39	October 21, 2023	Columbus, OH	#3 Ohio State	20	#7 Penn State	12
40	November 2, 2024	State College, PA	#4 Ohio State	20	#3 Penn State	13
41	November 1, 2025	Columbus, OH	#1 Ohio State	38	Penn State	14
Series: Ohio State leads 26–14
† Vacated by Ohio State

== See also ==
- List of NCAA college football rivalry games
