= Block Six =

2016 Ohio State vs. Penn State football game
- Conference game
Ohio State Buckeyes	Penn State Nittany Lions
(6–0)	(4–2)
21	24
Head coach: Urban Meyer	Head coach: James Franklin
AP / Coaches; 2 / 2
	1	2	3	4	Total
Ohio State	0	12	9	0	21
Penn State	0	7	0	17	24
- Date: October 22, 2016
- Season: 2016
- Stadium: Beaver Stadium
- Location: State College, Pennsylvania
- Favorite: Ohio State by 19.5
- Referee: Mike Cannon
- Attendance: 107,280

United States TV coverage
- Network: ABC
- Announcers: Chris Fowler and Kirk Herbstreit
- Nielsen ratings: 8.2

The Block Six was a blocked field goal by the Penn State Nittany Lions against the Ohio State Buckeyes, resulting in a 70-yard touchdown return in the final minutes of a 2016 rivalry game between the two teams in Happy Valley. The play led Penn State to beat Ohio State for the first time in five years, with a final score of 24–21. It is regarded as one of the best plays in Penn State football history, and marked the program's return to national relevance following the Jerry Sandusky scandal.

== The game ==
Penn State was a 19.5-point home underdog in this matchup, unranked in the AP poll. Much of this was attributed to this game being a White Out in State College, and the Buckeyes scraping by Wisconsin in an overtime road win the week before. Penn State had won two straight games since falling to then-No. 4 Michigan in late September, while Ohio State was undefeated.

The game was initially very low scoring; neither team was able to get points on the board in the first quarter. By the beginning of the second quarter, however, Ohio State answered with two Tyler Durbin field goals and a Marcus Baugh touchdown, giving the Buckeyes a 12–0 lead. However, in the final seconds of the second quarter, a pass by Trace McSorley to Chris Godwin in the end zone completely changed the dynamics of the game for Penn State.

The third quarter saw Ohio State pick up another touchdown (by Curtis Samuel) and a high snap on a punt resulting in a safety. The Buckeyes remained scoreless throughout the fourth quarter while Trace McSorley scored a touchdown with a successful conversion, as well as a 34-yard field goal by Tyler Davis.

== The play ==
With just over four minutes remaining in regulation time and the score 21–17 Ohio State, the Buckeyes were within field goal range but were held to a fourth-down-and-seven at the 31-yard line. Tyler Durbin looked to make Ohio State score for the first time in the quarter with a 45-yard field goal. However, the kick was blocked by safety Marcus Allen and knocked into the hands of cornerback Grant Haley, who sped past Durbin and ran 71 yards for a Penn State touchdown. Penn State shut out the Buckeyes for the remainder of the game, making the final score 24–21 Penn State.

=== Announcer reactions ===
Chris Fowler calling the play for ABC:

Urban [Meyer] thought about it, now they’re going to rush the field goal team out here, because this is a career long attempt for Tyler Durbin, who’s super reliable inside of 40. This is from 45, and it’s blocked! Lions scoop it up! Grant Haley will score! Marcus Allen made the block! The veteran safety... Haley scooped it up, and Penn State, incredibly, has the lead!

Steve Jones calling the play for the Penn State football network:

Kick is up, IT’S BLOCKED!! ON THE TURF, PICKED UP BY HALEY!! HALEY, THE 50, THE 40, 30, 25, 20, HALEY 10, 5, TOUCHDOWN PENN STATE!! MARCUS ALLEN BLOCKED IT!! AND GRANT HALEY TAKES IT TO THE HOUSE!! AND THE NITTANY LIONS ELECTRIFY BEAVER STADIUM AND TAKE THE LEAD WITH 4:27 TO GO!!

== Facts ==
- James Franklin's first win over a ranked opponent as head coach of Penn State
- Penn State's first ranked win since the season-ending upset of Wisconsin in 2013
- Penn State's first win over Ohio State since 2011
- Penn State's first home win over Ohio State since 2005 (the first White Out Game)
- Penn State's first win over a top-5 team since 1999
- Ohio State's first road loss under Urban Meyer
- The first quarter was the first full quarter Ohio State was shut out since 2011
- Longest regulation Big Ten game at the time, lasting over 4 hours and extending past midnight

== Aftermath ==
=== In the stadium ===
The crowd at Beaver Stadium was stunned by the play, as it gave the Nittany Lions the first lead with 4:27 remaining in the 4th quarter. Upon completion of the game, spectators stormed the field as Zombie Nation's Kernkraft 400 played from the stadium's loudspeakers. Head Coach James Franklin stated that he was "very happy for our kids" to experience a White Out win, the first win over Ohio State in five years.

=== Celebratory riots ===
One controversial event that occurred immediately following the game was a celebratory riot in Downtown State College, centered along Beaver Avenue. Approximately 10,000 fans, primarily Penn State students blocked several roads and wreaked havoc, such as breaking light posts and lighting sofas on fire. Centre County Police were assisted by the Pennsylvania State police, who came in riot gear to break up the riot. Total damages were estimated to be $17,000, and 13 individuals were charged as a result of not following orders.

=== Subsequent games ===
Both the Buckeyes and Nittany Lions eventually finished the season with identical 8–1 conference records, with Penn State winning the East Division by virtue of this victory and the right to face Wisconsin in the Big Ten Championship in Indianapolis, which the Nittany Lions won 38–31. The Buckeyes lost to eventual national champion Clemson 31–0 in the College Football Playoff Semifinal in the 2016 Fiesta Bowl, while the Nittany Lions were defeated by the USC Trojans 52–49 in the 2017 Rose Bowl.

This is Penn State's most recent win against the Buckeyes, having lost 9 straight in the series since.
