= 2006 Gator Bowl =

2006 Toyota Gator Bowl
- 61st Gator Bowl
Louisville Cardinals	Virginia Tech Hokies
(9–2)	(10–2)
Big East	ACC
24	35
Head coach: Bobby Petrino	Head coach: Frank Beamer
AP / Coaches / BCS; 15 / 16 / 19	AP / Coaches / BCS; 12 / 12 / 10
	1	2	3	4	Total
Louisville	14	3	0	7	24
Virginia Tech	3	7	3	22	35
- Date: January 2, 2006
- Season: 2005
- Stadium: Alltel Stadium
- Location: Jacksonville, Florida, United States
- MVP: Cedric Humes (Virginia Tech), Hunter Cantwell (Louisville)
- Favorite: Virginia Tech by 7.5
- National anthem: Monty Lane Allen
- Referee: Steve Usechek (Big 12)
- Halftime show: Various high school marching bands from Kentucky, Virginia, West Virginia, New York, Florida and Michigan
- Attendance: 63,780

United States TV coverage
- Network: NBC
- Announcers: Tom Hammond, Pat Haden, and Lewis Johnson
- Nielsen ratings: 3.93

The 2006 Gator Bowl was a college football bowl game between the Louisville Cardinals and the Virginia Tech Hokies at Alltel Stadium in Jacksonville, Florida, United States, on January 2, 2006. The game was the final contest of the 2005 football season for each team and resulted in a 35–24 Virginia Tech victory. Louisville represented the Big East Conference (Big East), and Virginia Tech represented the Atlantic Coast Conference (ACC) in the competition.

Louisville was selected as a participant in the 2006 Gator Bowl following a 9–2 regular season of their first year in the Big East Conference. Louisville won its last five games before the Gator Bowl and participated in the Liberty Bowl at the end of the previous season. Facing the 15th-ranked Cardinals, were the 12th-ranked Hokies. Virginia Tech finished 10–2 regular season, and included wins over 15th-ranked Georgia Tech and traditional rivals Virginia and West Virginia. A loss to Florida State in the inaugural ACC Championship Game gave Tech a position in the Gator Bowl instead of the more prestigious Bowl Championship Series-run Orange Bowl game. Pre-game media coverage of the game focused on Louisville's loss of star quarterback Brian Brohm to injury, Virginia Tech's fall from being a contender for the national championship, the fact that both teams were playing under new conference affiliations, and the rise of Virginia Tech quarterback Marcus Vick, younger brother of NFL star Michael Vick.

The 2006 Gator Bowl began on January 2, 2006, at 12:30 p.m. EST in Jacksonville. Louisville led for much of the game, beginning with an 11-yard touchdown pass in the first quarter by backup quarterback Hunter Cantwell, who filled in for the injured Brohm. Tech's offense replied with a field goal, but Louisville was able to add another touchdown before the end of the quarter, extending its lead to 14–3. In the second quarter, Virginia Tech fought back and narrowed Louisville's lead to a single touchdown. At halftime, the score was 17–10 in Louisville's favor. In the second half, Virginia Tech's offense began to have success. Tech earned the only points of the third quarter—a 28-yard field goal from kicker Brandon Pace—to narrow Louisville's lead to 17–13. In the fourth quarter, the game fully turned in the Hokies' favor. Though Louisville scored a touchdown early in the quarter, Virginia Tech scored 22 unanswered points in the final 13 minutes of the game to take a 35–24 lead and earn the win.

Tailback Cedric Humes was named the most valuable player of the game for Virginia Tech, and quarterback Hunter Cantwell was named the Cardinals' most valuable player. Tech punter Nic Schmitt set Gator Bowl records for punt yardage and average punt distance, kicking the ball six times for 300 yards, an average of 50 yards per kick. Virginia Tech's win was marred by excessive penalties and unsportsmanlike conduct that resulted in the ejection of one player. Following the game, Virginia Tech quarterback Marcus Vick was released from the team as a result of several incidents of misconduct, including a stomp on Louisville defender Elvis Dumervil's leg during the game. Several players who participated in the game, including Dumervil, later went on to careers in the National Football League.

== Team selection ==
In the 2005 college football season, the Atlantic Coast Conference had an automatic bid to the Gator Bowl. By contract, the Gator Bowl Association—which produces the game—possessed the first pick of bowl-eligible ACC teams after the winner of the ACC Championship Game was given a spot in a Bowl Championship Series (BCS) game. This was the final year that the Gator Bowl had first pick of eligible ACC teams, as contract renegotiations later resulted in the Gator Bowl slipping to the third selection, beginning with the 2006 college football season. Virginia Tech, losers of the 2005 ACC Championship Game, were chosen by the Gator Bowl Association to participate as the ACC's representative to the 2006 Gator Bowl.

The other half of the matchup would consist of either Notre Dame or the first selection from the Big East Conference after that conference's automatic BCS bid. Because Notre Dame was selected to play in the 2006 Fiesta Bowl, a BCS game, the Gator Bowl Association was required to select the Big East's Louisville Cardinals, which, like Virginia Tech, finished second in their conference.

=== Louisville ===
The Louisville Cardinals football team came into the 2005 season having gone 11–1 the previous season, including a season-ending 44–40 victory over Boise State in the 2004 Liberty Bowl. In addition, Louisville was also entering a new conference—the Big East—after departing Conference USA following the end of the 2004 season. In a poll of media members covering the Big East prior to the 2005 season, Louisville was predicted to win the Big East championship its first year in the conference.

In their first and second games of the season, the Cardinals lived up to that expectation. At in-state rival Kentucky, Louisville earned a 31–24 victory to win the Governor's Cup. This was followed the next week by a 63–27 victory over non-conference opponent Oregon State. Unfortunately for the Cardinals, their first Big East conference game of the season—and of school history—did not go as well. At South Florida, the ninth-ranked Cardinals were outscored 45–14, the first time in 13 games Louisville's offense was held to less than 30 points.

Following the loss, Louisville recovered, scoring 61 points and 69 points, respectively, in non-conference wins over Florida Atlantic and North Carolina, returning to their previous offensive success. Again, however, Louisville faltered against a Big East opponent. The Cardinals' second Big East game, at West Virginia, was another Louisville loss, 46–44. West Virginia later went on to finish 11–1 for the season, winning the Big East championship and defeating the Georgia Bulldogs in the 2006 Sugar Bowl.

Louisville, meanwhile, returned to its winning ways. The Cardinals, following their loss to the Mountaineers, won their first Big East game in school history the next week, over Cincinnati, 46–22. The rout of Cincinnati sparked a five-game winning streak, which concluded on December 3 with a 30–20 victory over Connecticut. Unfortunately for the Cardinals, starting quarterback Brian Brohm, who had the sixth-best season (in terms of passing yards) in Louisville history, suffered a season-ending knee injury. With West Virginia having won the Big East championship and an automatic Bowl Championship Series game bid, Big East second-place Louisville was selected by the Gator Bowl even before the victory over Connecticut.

=== Virginia Tech ===
The Virginia Tech Hokies football team began the 2005 college football season as reigning Atlantic Coast Conference football champions. The Hokies also played in the 2005 Sugar Bowl against the third-ranked Auburn Tigers, losing 16–13 in a close contest. Expectations were high for the Hokies to repeat their ACC championship performance the next year, and a preseason poll of media covering ACC football resulted in Virginia Tech being picked to face Florida State in the inaugural ACC Championship Game.

In its first game of the season, however, eighth-ranked Virginia Tech almost let those expectations fall short. At North Carolina State, the Hokies trailed at halftime and were tied at the beginning of the fourth quarter before eking out a 20–16 win in the final minutes. The Hokies bounced back from the close contest in their second game of the season—against the Duke—as Tech raced to a 45–0 victory. The Hokies held Duke to just 35 yards of total offense, Tech's best defensive performance in the modern era.

The win over Duke was followed by several others in succession. Heading into their ninth game of the season, the Hokies were 8–0 record and the third-ranked college football team in the country. Against the fifth-ranked Miami Hurricanes, however, Virginia Tech suffered its first defeat of the season, falling 27–7. Tech recovered by winning its next two games, earning a spot in the inaugural Atlantic Coast Conference Championship Game, held in Jacksonville, Florida. There, the Hokies lost, 27–22, to the Florida State. The Seminoles earned an automatic bid to a Bowl Championship Series game by virtue of the victory—had Virginia Tech won the game, it would have been awarded the bid. The day after Tech lost the ACC Championship Game, the Gator Bowl extended a formal invitation to Virginia Tech, which the Hokies accepted. Ninth-ranked Miami, the same team that beat the Hokies 27–7 earlier in the season, was considered for selection, but the Gator Bowl Association took into consideration Virginia Tech's history of having a large fan base travel to its bowl games, and selected the Hokies on those grounds.

== Pregame buildup ==
Pregame media and fan interest surrounding the game focused largely on Louisville's top-ranked offense and Virginia Tech's first-ranked scoring defense. Other major points of media coverage included the two teams' quarterbacks: Louisville's Hunter Cantwell, who replaced starter Brian Brohm after Brohm suffered a season-ending knee injury; and Virginia Tech's Marcus Vick, brother of National Football League star Michael Vick. Also a concern for Louisville was the health of star running back Michael Bush, who missed two games in November due to an injury. On a wider note, there was also interest in the conference-level showdown between a new Big East team (Louisville) and a team that left the Big East for the ACC after the 2003 season (Virginia Tech). For Virginia Tech, there was also the hope of overcoming the disappointment of a season that saw the Hokies ranked third in the country and in the hunt for the national championship before failing to even win the Atlantic Coast Conference and missing a bid to a Bowl Championship Series game.

When betting on the game opened, spread bettors favored Virginia Tech by 10 points. Five days after betting opened, the point spread narrowed to 7.5, still in favor of Virginia Tech. Two weeks later, the point spread remained at 7.5 in favor of Virginia Tech.

=== Offensive matchup ===
==== Louisville offense ====
Heading into the Gator Bowl, Louisville's scoring offense was ranked third in the country—averaging 45.2 points per game—and was held under 30 points just once in their preceding 21 games. The high-powered Cardinals' offense was predicted to pose a challenge for the Virginia Tech defense.

With star quarterback Brian Brohm having undergone surgery to repair a torn anterior cruciate ligament, there were some questions as to how backup Hunter Cantwell would perform under pressure. Cantwell played well in the Cardinals' season-ending contest against Connecticut, but some commentators predicted that Virginia Tech's quicker defense would pose problems for him. In that contest, Cantwell completed 16 of 25 passes for 271 yards and a touchdown. In high school, Cantwell passed for 7,272 yards and 70 touchdowns. His .606 career completion percentage ranked 11th in Kentucky state history.

Running back Michael Bush was predicted to return to form after suffering a foot injury that kept him out of two games in November. Bush ran for 121 yards and three touchdowns against Connecticut, his first game back from the injury. Heading into the Gator Bowl, Bush earned a school-record 24 touchdowns and led the country in scoring. He ran for 1,049 yards in nine games. He was also a capable receiver, catching 20 passes for 245 yards and a touchdown. But with Brohm on the sidelines, it was expected the Cardinals would rely on Bush's legs more than usual, in an effort to minimize the need for the inexperienced Cantwell to pass the ball.

Louisville wide receiver Mario Urrutia, who caught 31 passes for 702 yards and six touchdowns during the regular season, stirred a bit of controversy in the final days leading up to the Gator Bowl after he declared that Virginia Tech's first-ranked defense was "mostly hype".

==== Virginia Tech offense ====
Virginia Tech quarterback Marcus Vick was considered the key player for the Virginia Tech offense heading into the Gator Bowl. The younger brother of first-overall NFL draft pick Michael Vick—who also played for Tech—Marcus led the league in passing efficiency (141.6 rating), completed 166 of 268 passes (60.3 percent) for 2,190 yards and 15 touchdowns, with ten interceptions. On the ground, he ran for 370 yards and six touchdowns. Prior to the Gator Bowl, he pledged that he would return for another season at Virginia Tech before entering the NFL draft. "The NFL is tough. It's the real deal. You've got to be ready for it. You just don't want to rush into just throwing yourself out there because of the money or anything like that. You've got to really be prepared for it", he said.

On the ground, two different Tech players were predicted to share time running the ball. Senior running back Cedric Humes was predicted to get the bulk of the carries in the game, but redshirt freshman Branden Ore was also predicted to see some plays at times. Humes rushed the ball 140 times for 639 yards and ten touchdowns during the regular season. Ore, meanwhile, ran the ball for 591 yards and six touchdowns.

Wide receiver Josh Morgan was also considered a key component of the Hokie offense. Morgan finished the season with 28 receptions for 471 yards and four touchdowns. Prior to the game, Morgan predicted that if the Hokies executed their plays well, they would emerge the victors.

Backup guard Brandon Gore broke his ankle during the Hokies' loss to Florida State and would not be able to participate. Senior Tech running back Mike Imoh, who shared time running the ball during the regular season with Ore and Humes, was also out after undergoing surgery to repair an injured ankle. Adding to the injury situation for Virginia Tech was offensive tackle Jimmy Martin, who suffered a sprained knee ligament in practice leading up to the game. Martin started 45 consecutive games prior to the Gator Bowl, a streak that was broken when he was replaced by Brandon Frye on the day of the game.

=== Defensive matchup ===
==== Louisville defense ====
Shortly after Louisville was selected to the 2006 Gator Bowl, Cardinals defensive end Elvis Dumervil was awarded the Bronko Nagurski Trophy, given annually to the top defensive college football player in the United States. Dumervil also earned several other honors in the weeks leading up to the game, including being named Big East Defensive Player of the Year, an Associated Press All-American and earning the Ted Hendricks Award, given annually to the best defensive end in the country. Dumervil led the nation in sacks (20) and forced fumbles (10) during the regular season. Prior to the game, he announced that he was looking forward to the contest, saying, "To me, I wanted to play the best possible team in the Gator Bowl, and I think that's what we've got".

A week and a half after Dumervil won the Nagurski Trophy, senior defensive tackle Montavious Stanley, who was a leader on defense for Louisville, underwent surgery to repair a torn pectoral muscle. Stanley was the Cardinals' best run-stopper on defense, amassing 48 tackles and 5.5 sacks during the season.

==== Virginia Tech defense ====
Coming into the Gator Bowl, the Virginia Tech defense was ranked first in total defense, second in pass defense, fourth in rushing defense, and third in scoring defense, allowing an average of just over 12 points per game. The Virginia Tech defense was led by defensive end Darryl Tapp, a first-team All-ACC pick, an American Football Coaches Association (AFCA) All-American, a finalist for the Lott Trophy, and a finalist for the Ted Hendricks Award. Tapp was considered a natural leader both on and off the field and led the Hokies' defensive workouts during practice. Tapp finished the regular season with 45 tackles (including 12.5 for a loss) and ten sacks. He was also named a second-team Associated Press All-American, and he won the Dudley Award, given annually to the best college football player in the state of Virginia.

Tech cornerback Jimmy F. Williams, considered a cornerstone of the Hokie defense, was a finalist for the Nagurski Trophy that season, but lost to Louisville's Elvis Dumervil. Williams was Tech's sole first-team Associated Press All-American and also was named to the American Football Coaches Association, Football Writers Association of American and Walter Camp All-America teams. He recorded 44 tackles and an interception for the Hokies in the regular season. Williams had foregone entering the NFL draft after the 2004 college football season in order to return to Virginia Tech for his senior season, and he was expected to be a high draft pick upon graduation.

== Game summary ==
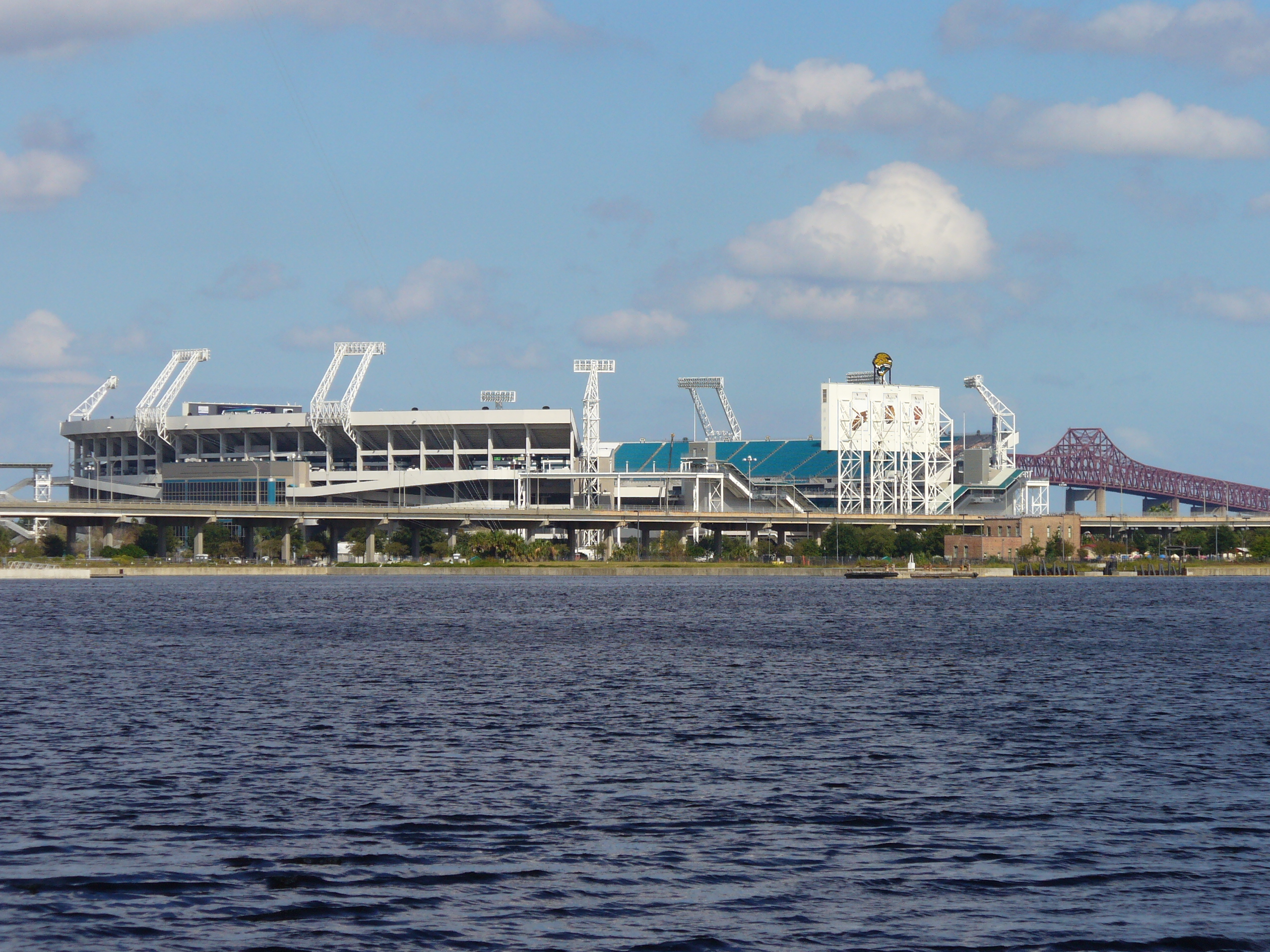
Alltel Stadium, now called TIAA Bank Field, was the site of the 2006 Gator Bowl.

The 2006 Gator Bowl kicked off at 12:30 p.m. EST on January 2, 2006, in Jacksonville, Florida. Official attendance for the game was listed as 63,780, placing it at 34th (out of 62) on the list of Gator Bowls in terms of attendance. At kickoff, the weather was mostly cloudy with a temperature of approximately 76 degrees. The wind was from the south-southwest at 11 miles per hour (18 km/h). Approximately 4.14 million American households watched the game on television, earning the game a Nielsen rating of 3.93. The pre-game show featured the Marching Virginians, the Cardinal Marching Band, and the Wachovia Dance Team, a collection of Jacksonville-area entertainers. Also before kickoff, the stadium was overflown by a flight of U.S. Navy F/A-18 Super Hornets from VFA-103, based in Virginia. The national anthem was sung by Monty Lane Allen, member of a Gospel singing group.

=== First quarter ===
Virginia Tech won the ceremonial pre-game coin toss to select first possession and deferred its option to the second half; Louisville elected to receive the opening kick. The Cardinals began the game's opening drive at their own 18-yard line after the opening kickoff. Running back Michael Bush rushed for 12 yards on the game's opening play, netting the game's first first down. Subsequent plays, however, saw Louisville struggle to gain another. Facing fourth down and six yards at their own 34-yard line, the Cardinals seemingly prepared to punt. Instead, the Cardinals executed a trick play by running back Kolby Smith, who ran with the ball. Smith surprised the Tech defense and broke free for a 30-yard run, converting the first down and continuing the Louisville drive. Eight plays later, Louisville quarterback Hunter Cantwell connected on an 11-yard pass to Mario Urrutia for a touchdown and the game's first points. The extra point kick was good, and with 10:42 remaining in the first quarter, Louisville took a 7–0 lead.

Virginia Tech's first possession of the game began at its own 32-yard line after Louisville's post-touchdown kickoff. Tech running back Cedric Humes gained 12 yards and a first down on the Hokies' first play of the game, and quarterback Marcus Vick completed a 24-yard pass to wide receiver Josh Hyman three plays later to get another first down and drive the Hokies into Louisville territory. After Vick was stopped for losses on two consecutive rushing plays, he completed another long pass to Hyman for a first down. Subsequent plays saw Tech advance into the Louisville red zone but fail to gain another first down. Kicker Brandon Pace entered the game to attempt a 36-yard field goal kick, which was successful. With six minutes remaining in the first quarter, Tech cut Louisville's lead to 7–3.

Louisville's second drive of the game was much quicker than the Cardinals' first. After beginning at their own 20-yard line, it took the Cardinals just seven plays to travel 80 yards and earn a touchdown. Louisville was helped throughout the drive by repeated Virginia Tech personal foul penalties. Tech players committed three separate 15-yard personal fouls during the drive, one of which came after Louisville's successful extra point kick when cornerback Jimmy Williams bumped a game official. Williams was ejected from the game for the contact and was removed from the field after watching the next series from the sidelines. The touchdown and extra point extended Louisville's first-quarter lead to 14–3.

Tech received the ball at its 20-yard line with 2:44 remaining in the first quarter. Three quick rushes picked up 22 yards and two first downs, pushing the ball to the Tech 42-yard line. On the next play, however, wide receiver Justin Harper committed a 15-yard pass interference penalty, which negated much of the previous plays' gains. Marcus Vick rushed for five yards, threw two incomplete passes, and was unable to get another first down after the penalty. With time winding down in the quarter, Tech was forced to punt the ball away. The game's first punt traveled 53 yards, and Louisville took over on offense at its 40-yard line following a 25-yard punt return as time expired in the quarter. At the end of the first quarter, Louisville led Virginia Tech, 14–3.

=== Second quarter ===
Louisville began the second quarter in possession of the ball at its 40-yard line. Despite having good field position, the Cardinals were unable to gain more than four yards on three plays and were forced into their first punt of the game. Throughout much of the second quarter, both teams traded punts as each went three and out on several occasions. By the quarter's halfway point, Virginia Tech punted the ball twice in the period. Louisville punted the ball three times after kicking no punts at all in the first quarter.

After the third Louisville punt, Virginia Tech took over at its 46-yard line. Unlike the previous second-quarter possessions, which saw the Tech offense struggle to move the ball effectively, Tech began its drive with a five-yard rush. After losing seven yards on the next play, Marcus Vick completed a 19-yard pass to tight end Jeff King, driving the Hokies into Louisville territory for the first time in the quarter. Two plays later, Vick connected with wide receiver Justin Harper on a 33-yard pass that resulted in the Hokies' first touchdown of the game. With 4:56 remaining in the first half of the game, Tech trimmed Louisville's lead to 14–10.

Following the Tech touchdown, Louisville attempted to answer with points of its own before halftime. After starting on his own 20-yard line, Hunter Cantwell completed two quick passes that resulted in 26 yards. Two plays later, Michael Bush broke free for a 34-yard run, driving Louisville deep into the Virginia Tech side of the field. Despite having a first down at the Virginia Tech 18-yard line, Louisville was unable to gain any yards on three consecutive plays. Bush was stopped for no gain on a rushing attempt, and two Cantwell passes fell incomplete. Kicker Arthur Carmody came in to complete a 35-yard field goal, and with 2:16 remaining in the first half, Louisville led by a score of 17–10.

After receiving Louisville's kickoff, Virginia Tech elected to run out the clock and bring the first half to an end. During the process, Marcus Vick ran the ball on a designed play and was tackled by Cardinals defensive end Elvis Dumervil after Vick gained nine yards. Following the play, Vick paused, then stomped on Dumervil's leg. Though referees failed to observe the stomp, television commentators replayed the action, and Tech coaches considered pulling Vick from the game as punishment. At the end of the first half of play, Louisville held a 17–10 lead.

=== Third quarter ===
The second half of play began with Virginia Tech receiving the ball, going three and out, and punting the ball back to Louisville. The Cardinals reciprocated by also going three and out and punting the ball back to Virginia Tech. The Hokies began their second drive of the quarter at their one-yard line. Despite beginning deep in their own end of the field, Virginia Tech mounted a successful drive. Tailback Branden Ore and quarterback Marcus Vick alternated rushes, picking up 18 yards and a first down. After Vick was sacked by the Louisville defense, he recovered by throwing a 29-yard pass for another first down. Following the pass, Vick and Ore rushed for six consecutive plays, alternating carries at various intervals. Inside the Louisville red zone, however, the Cardinals' defense stiffened and the Tech offense began to falter. After Tech successfully gained a first down on fourth and one, the Hokies were unable to gain another. Tech kicker Brandon Pace was forced to make his second field goal of the game, this one a 28-yarder, to make the game 17–13 with 2:52 remaining in the quarter. The Tech drive began with 11:17 remaining in the quarter and took eight minutes and 25 seconds off the clock.

Louisville received the post-field goal kickoff, but again went three and out, punting the ball back to Virginia Tech. Louisville did not pick up a first down in the third quarter, and Tech began yet another drive as time ran out in the quarter. With one quarter remaining in the game, Tech narrowed the Louisville lead to 17–13.

=== Fourth quarter ===
Shortly after the fourth quarter began, the Virginia Tech drive that began in the waning moments of the third quarter came to an end. The Hokies were forced to punt, and Louisville began its first drive of the fourth quarter. The Cardinals' Harry Douglas ran for 29 yards on their first play of the drive. On the second, Hunter Cantwell completed a 29-yard touchdown pass to Gary Barnidge. It took Louisville just 33 seconds and two plays to travel 58 yards and earn a touchdown. The score gave Louisville a 24–13 lead with 13:32 remaining to play. But just as it took Louisville just two plays to score, so too did it take Virginia Tech two plays to answer the Louisville touchdown. After taking over at his team's 22-yard line, Marcus Vick completed a 54-yard pass to wide receiver David Clowney. Virginia Tech and Louisville committed offsetting 15-yard personal foul penalties before the play, to no effect on the Hokie offense. On the next play after the long pass, Cedric Humes rushed for 24 yards and the answering Hokie touchdown. It took just 28 seconds for Virginia Tech to answer the Louisville touchdown. Having done that, Tech went Louisville one better, successfully scoring a two-point conversion on a pass from Vick to Morgan. The touchdown and two-point conversion cut the Louisville lead to 24–21.

The Cardinals began their second drive of the quarter at their own 25-yard line. In fits and starts, the Louisville offense advanced down the field. Kolby Smith ran for a yard, Michael Bush for two, then six yards, and Cantwell completed two passes of seven yards each. The Cardinals were also helped by a defensive pass interference penalty against Virginia Tech, which gave Louisville a first down by penalty. As Louisville began to enter Tech territory in earnest, however, the Cardinals suffered their first turnover of the game. Facing third down and three yards from the Virginia Tech 40-yard line, Cantwell was sacked and fumbled the ball. Tech defender Xavier Adibi scooped up the loose ball, and Tech gained the initiative. Following the fumble, the Hokies began a drive at their 47-yard line. On the first play, Tech was aided by a pass interference penalty on Louisville. The penalty was followed by a three-yard Cedric Humes rush and yet another pass interference penalty against Louisville. Humes rushed twice more for five yards, and Vick completed a 16-yard pass to David Clowney before Vick completed a five-yard touchdown pass to Jeff King. The score and subsequent extra point gave Virginia Tech a 28–24 lead—its first of the game—with 6:03 remaining.

Louisville took over on offense needing to get a touchdown to regain a lead before the waning clock finally ran out of time. After the Tech kickoff and a touchback, the Cardinals took over at their 20-yard line. Michael Bush ran for 10 yards and a first down, and Hunter Cantwell scrambled for six more on a rushing play. Facing third down and needing four yards, Cantwell dropped back to pass for the first down. As the pass soared through the air, Tech defender James Anderson jumped and caught the ball, intercepting it. Still on his feet, Anderson quickly rushed the other way and, unimpeded, ran 39 yards into the end zone for a Virginia Tech touchdown. The score and extra point energized Virginia Tech's offense and defense and gave the Hokies an 11-point lead—35–24—with 4:45 remaining in the game.

Louisville returned on offense, needing to score quickly, make a stop on defense, then score a second time to take the lead. The energized Tech defense was disinclined to allow any such thing. Though Cantwell completed two short passes for 16 yards and a first down, he was sacked on first down and the Tech defense prevented him from completing another pass. Two passes were knocked down by Hokie defenders, while another fell short. After Louisville failed to convert a fourth down, Virginia Tech took over on offense. The Hokies proceeded to run out the clock, executing two short rushes and an incomplete pass. Louisville had one final chance on offense after a Tech punt, but three consecutive desperation Hail Mary passes were unsuccessful. Two fell incomplete, and the third was intercepted by Tech cornerback Brandon Flowers. With time almost gone, Tech finished running out the clock and secured the victory. As time expired, Virginia Tech held a 35–24 lead and won the 2006 Gator Bowl.

== Final statistics ==
Statistical comparison
	UL	VT
1st downs	20	21
Total yards	343	390
Passing yards	216	203
Rushing yards	127	187
Penalties	5–49	7–93
3rd down conversions	5–15	5–14
4th down conversions	1–2	1–1
Turnovers	4	0
Time of possession	23:39	36:21

Running back Cedric Humes was named the game's most valuable player for Virginia Tech, and quarterback Hunter Cantwell was named the Cardinals' most valuable player. Tech punter Nic Schmitt set Gator Bowl record for punt yardage and average punt distance, kicking the ball six times for 300 yards, an average of 50 yards per kick.

Despite being more highly promoted in pregame media coverage, Virginia Tech quarterback Marcus Vick was outperformed statistically by Louisville's Hunter Cantwell. Vick completed 11 of 21 passes for 203 yards and two touchdowns. He also ran for 10 yards on 13 carries. Cantwell, meanwhile, completed 15 of his 37 passes for 216 yards, three touchdowns, and three interceptions.

On the ground, Tech running back Cedric Humes led all rushers with 22 carries for 113 yards and one touchdown. Louisville's leading rusher, Michael Bush, had 16 carries for 94 yards and one fumble. The third-leading rusher in the game was Tech's Branden Ore, who carried the ball 11 times for 56 yards. Louisville's Kolby Smith carried the ball three times for 32 yards, including a 30-yard run that was the game's second-longest rushing play.

Defensively, Virginia Tech dominated, intercepting the ball three times, forcing a fumble once, and earning one defensive touchdown. Two Louisville defenders had the best individual performances during the game, however. Brandon Johnson and Abe Brown had six tackles apiece, and Brown sacked Marcus Vick once for a loss of ten yards. The sack was one of three earned by the Louisville offense during the game. Virginia Tech's defense earned two sacks during the game, and the Hokies' leading tackler was Vince Hall, who recorded four and two assists on sacks of Louisville's Hunter Cantwell.

== Postgame effects ==
Virginia Tech's victory in the 2006 Gator Bowl had far-reaching effects for both the Hokies and the Louisville Cardinals. The win pushed Tech to 11–2 on the season, while the Cardinals' loss ensured they ended the 2005 season with a 9–3 overall record. The game itself provided more than $14 million in economic benefit to the Jacksonville area as Louisville and Virginia Tech fans flocked to the region, spending money on food, hotel rooms, transportation, and entertainment.

Virginia Tech quarterbacks coach Kevin Rogers announced after the game that he would be leaving the team in order to become an assistant coach with the NFL's Minnesota Vikings. Rogers was replaced by new hire Mike O'Cain. Tech offensive coordinator Bryan Stinespring's second job as offensive line coach was filled by James Madison University assistant coach Curt Newsome.

=== Marcus Vick ===
Following the 2005 ACC Championship Game, Virginia Tech quarterback Marcus Vick stormed off the field, refusing to talk to reporters following the loss. Vick, who picked up a 15-yard unsportsmanlike conduct penalty late in that game, also earned several unsportsmanlike conduct penalties in the 2006 Gator Bowl, where post-game replays revealed he purposefully stomped on the leg of Louisville Cardinals' defensive end Elvis Dumervil. Vick claimed he apologized to Dumervil after the game, but Dumervil stated that no apology was made. Referee Steve Usecheck admitted that he and his Big 12 Conference crew missed the stomp and apologized for doing so, saying he would have ejected Vick had he seen it. In the wake of the incident, Virginia Tech officials announced that they would be conducting a review of Vick's conduct on and off the field.

On January 6, 2006, just a few days after the Gator Bowl, Virginia Tech officials dismissed Vick from the Virginia Tech football team, citing a December 17 traffic stop in which Vick was cited for speeding and driving with a revoked or suspended license. Vick hid the information from the team and the infraction was not discovered until January. The traffic stop, an earlier suspension from the team, and his unsportsmanlike conduct during the 2005 ACC Championship Game and 2006 Gator Bowl were used as grounds for his dismissal. In response to being dismissed from the team, Vick was quoted as saying, "It's not a big deal. I'll just move on to the next level, baby". Vick appeared in one regular-season NFL game for the Miami Dolphins in 2006. The Dolphins did not renew his contract, and he has been out of football ever since.

=== 2006 NFL draft ===
On April 29 and 30, the National Football League held its annual player draft. Over a dozen players who participated in the 2006 Gator Bowl were selected in the draft. Virginia Tech had a record nine players selected in the draft, with Darryl Tapp (31st overall) selected first from the Hokies. Jimmy Williams (37th overall), James Anderson (88th), Jeff King (155th), Jonathan Lewis (177th), Justin Hamilton (222nd), Jimmy Martin (227th), Will Montgomery (234th), and Cedric Humes (240th) were the other Tech players selected. Louisville had four players selected in the draft. Offensive guard Jason Spitz was selected 75th overall and was the first Cardinals' offensive lineman to be drafted since 1996. Elvis Dumervil was selected with the 126th selection, linebacker Brandon Johnson was selected 142nd, and defensive tackle Montavious Stanley was selected 182nd.

== See also ==
- Glossary of American football
- 2006 NCAA Division I FBS football rankings
