= 2005 Virginia Tech Hokies football team =

American college football season

2005 Virginia Tech Hokies football
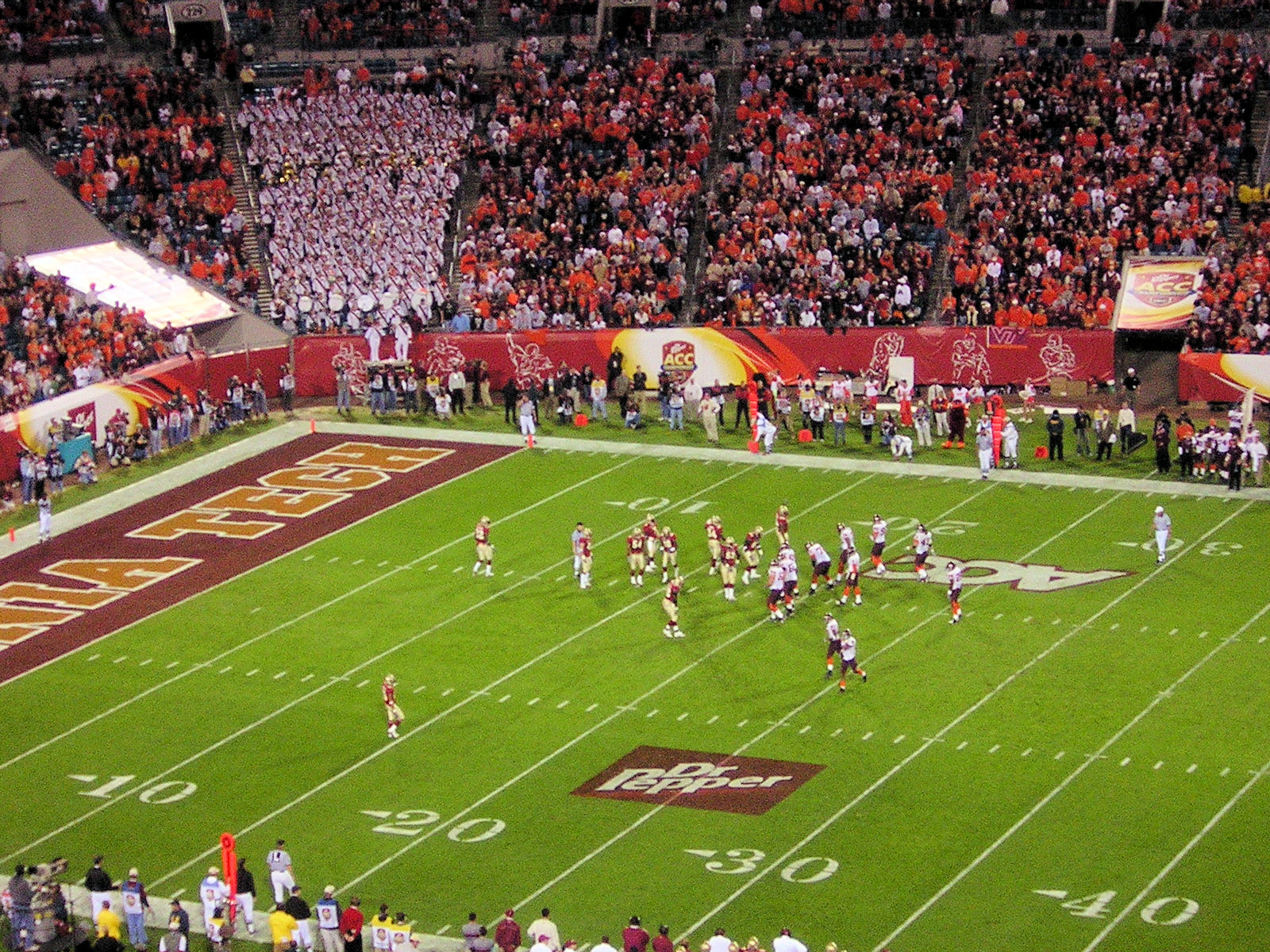

ACC Coastal Division champion Gator Bowl champion

ACC Championship Game, L 22–27 vs. Florida State

Gator Bowl, W 35–24 vs. Louisville
- Conference: Atlantic Coast Conference
- Coastal Division

Ranking
- Coaches: No. 7
- AP: No. 7
- Record: 11–2 (7–1 ACC)
- Head coach: Frank Beamer (19th season)
- Offensive coordinator: Bryan Stinespring (4th season)
- Offensive scheme: Pro-style
- Defensive coordinator: Bud Foster (11th season)
- Base defense: 4–4
- Home stadium: Lane Stadium

2005 Atlantic Coast Conference football standings
| | Conf. | | | Overall |
| Team | W | | L | W | | L |
|---|---|---|---|---|---|---|
Atlantic Division
| No. 23 Florida State xy$ | 5 | – | 3 | 8 | – | 5 |
| No. 18 Boston College x | 5 | – | 3 | 9 | – | 3 |
| No. 21 Clemson | 4 | – | 4 | 8 | – | 4 |
| Wake Forest | 3 | – | 5 | 4 | – | 7 |
| NC State | 3 | – | 5 | 7 | – | 5 |
| Maryland | 3 | – | 5 | 5 | – | 6 |
Coastal Division
| No. 7 Virginia Tech x | 7 | – | 1 | 11 | – | 2 |
| No. 17 Miami (FL) | 6 | – | 2 | 9 | – | 3 |
| Georgia Tech | 5 | – | 3 | 7 | – | 5 |
| North Carolina | 4 | – | 4 | 5 | – | 6 |
| Virginia | 3 | – | 5 | 7 | – | 5 |
| Duke | 0 | – | 8 | 1 | – | 10 |
Championship: Florida State 27, Virginia Tech 22
$ – BCS representative as conference champion; x – Division champion/co-champions; y – Championship game participant; Rankings from AP Poll

The 2005 Virginia Tech Hokies football team represented Virginia Polytechnic Institute and State University during the 2005 NCAA Division I-A football season. Led by head coach Frank Beamer in his 19th season, the Hokies entered the year ranked No. 7 in the USA Today Coaches Poll and No. 8 in the Associated Press Poll, following its ACC title in 2004. Virginia Tech won its first eight games of the season and suffered only one regular season loss, finishing 11–2 overall and 7–1 in ACC play to claim the ACC Coastal Division title.

Virginia Tech won its first eight games of the season, climbing as high as No. 3 in the national polls. The early stretch included dominant defensive performances and decisive wins over Georgia Tech, West Virginia, and Boston College. GameDay visited Blacksburg, Virginia twice during the season – for the Georgia Tech game on September 24, after Hurricane Rita forced the program to move from Baton Rouge, Louisiana, and for the Miami game on November 5. The Hokies’ national championship hopes were dashed on the second Gameday visit with a loss to No. 5 Miami, their only regular season conference defeat.

Virginia Tech advanced to the inaugural ACC Championship Game, where they faced Florida State. After a 3–3 halftime tie, the Seminoles scored 24 unanswered points in the third quarter. The Hokies mounted a fourth-quarter rally but fell short, losing 27–22.

The Hokies concluded the season at the 2006 Gator Bowl against No. 16 Louisville, rallying from a 17–10 halftime deficit to score 22 unanswered fourth-quarter points and win 35–24. Virginia Tech finished No. 7 in the final AP Poll, marking its second consecutive top-10 finish.

The Hokies finished first nationally in Total defense (247.62 yards per game) and third in Pass defense (154.23 yards per game).

Quarterback Marcus Vick led the offense with 2,393 passing yards and 17 touchdowns, while running backs Cedric Humes and Mike Imoh combined for over 1,500 rushing yards and 17 scores. Wide receivers David Clowney and Eddie Royal provided explosive playmaking, and tight end Jeff King added six touchdown receptions.

The season ended with controversy, as Vick was dismissed from the team shortly after the Gator Bowl following multiple off-field incidents, including an unsportsmanlike conduct penalty for stomping on a Louisville defender.

== Schedule ==
| Date | Time | Opponent | Rank | Site | TV | Result | Attendance | Source |
|---|---|---|---|---|---|---|---|---|
| September 4 | 7:00 p.m. | at NC State | No. 8 | Carter–Finley Stadium; Raleigh, NC | ESPN2 | W 20–16 | 57,500 | |
| September 10 | 12:00 p.m. | at Duke | No. 7 | Wallace Wade Stadium; Durham, NC | JPS | W 45–0 | 25,014 | |
| September 17 | 3:30 p.m. | Ohio* | No. 4 | Lane Stadium; Blacksburg, VA | ESPNU | W 45–0 | 65,115 | |
| September 24 | 3:30 p.m. | No. 15 Georgia Tech | No. 4 | Lane Stadium; Blacksburg, VA (rivalry, College GameDay) | ABC | W 51–7 | 65,115 | |
| October 1 | 12:00 p.m. | at West Virginia* | No. 3 | Milan Puskar Stadium; Morgantown, WV (rivalry) | ESPN | W 34–17 | 60,193 | |
| October 8 | 12:00 p.m. | Marshall* | No. 3 | Lane Stadium; Blacksburg, VA | ESPN2 | W 41–14 | 65,115 | |
| October 20 | 7:45 p.m. | at Maryland | No. 3 | Byrd Stadium; College Park, MD | ESPN | W 28–9 | 54,838 | |
| October 27 | 7:45 p.m. | No. 13 Boston College | No. 3 | Lane Stadium; Blacksburg, VA (rivalry) | ESPN | W 30–10 | 65,115 | |
| November 5 | 7:45 p.m. | No. 5 Miami (FL) | No. 3 | Lane Stadium; Blacksburg, VA (rivalry, College GameDay) | ESPN | L 7–27 | 65,115 | |
| November 19 | 12:00 p.m. | at Virginia | No. 7 | Scott Stadium; Charlottesville, VA (rivalry) | ESPN | W 52–14 | 63,344 | |
| November 26 | 7:45 p.m. | North Carolina | No. 5 | Lane Stadium; Blacksburg, VA | ESPN | W 30–3 | 65,115 | |
| December 3 | 8:00 p.m. | vs. Florida State | No. 5 | Alltel Stadium; Jacksonville, FL (ACC Championship Game) | ABC | L 22–27 | 72,749 | |
| January 2, 2006 | 12:30 p.m. | vs. No. 15 Louisville* | No. 12 | Alltel Stadium; Jacksonville, FL (Gator Bowl) | NBC | W 35–24 | 63,780 | |
*Non-conference game; Rankings from AP Poll released prior to the game; All times are in Eastern time

== Rankings ==
Ranking movements Legend: ██ Increase in ranking ██ Decrease in ranking
| | Week | | | | | | | | | | | | | | | |
| Poll | Pre | 1 | 2 | 3 | 4 | 5 | 6 | 7 | 8 | 9 | 10 | 11 | 12 | 13 | 14 | Final |
|---|---|---|---|---|---|---|---|---|---|---|---|---|---|---|---|---|
| AP | 8 | 7 | 4 | 4 | 3 | 3 | 3 | 3 | 3 | 3 | 8 | 7 | 5 | 5 | 12 | 7 |
| Coaches | 7 | 6 | 4 | 4 | 3 | 3 | 3 | 3 | 3 | 3 | 8 | 6 | 5 | 5 | 12 | 7 |
| Harris | Not released | | | | 3 | 3 | 3 | 3 | 3 | 3 | 8 | 7 | 6 | 5 | 11 | Not released |
| BCS | Not released | | | | | | | 3 | 3 | 3 | 6 | 6 | 5 | 5 | 10 | Not released |

== Game summaries ==
=== NC State ===
| | 1 | 2 | 3 | 4 | Total |
|---|---|---|---|---|---|
| #7 Virginia Tech Hokies | 7 | 3 | 3 | 7 | 20 |
| NC State Wolfpack | 7 | 6 | 0 | 3 | 16 |

Seventh-ranked Virginia Tech opened the season with a 20–16 win over NC State at Carter–Finley Stadium, relying on opportunistic defense and special teams to overcome a sluggish offensive performance. The Hokies were outgained by more than 200 yards but capitalized on three Wolfpack turnovers and 12 penalties for 105 yards to escape with a narrow victory.

After NC State struck first with a 25-yard touchdown run by Bobby Washington, Virginia Tech responded with a 5-yard touchdown run by Mike Imoh and a 44-yard field goal by Brandon Pace to take a 10–7 lead. The Wolfpack regained the advantage with field goals of 33 and 27 yards by John Deraney, sending them into halftime up 13–10.

In the third quarter, Pace tied the game with a 28-yard field goal, and early in the fourth, Marcus Vick connected with David Clowney for a 19-yard touchdown pass to give the Hokies a 20–13 lead. NC State added a 35-yard field goal with just over eight minutes remaining, but Virginia Tech’s defense held firm the rest of the way.

Vick, making his first career start, completed 10 of 21 passes for 108 yards and one touchdown. Imoh led the rushing attack with 74 yards and a score on 17 carries, while Clowney caught three passes for 38 yards and the game-winning touchdown. On defense, James Anderson recorded 13 tackles, and Darryl Tapp added six tackles and a sack. Punter Nic Schmitt averaged 46.5 yards on six punts, consistently flipping field position in a game where the Hokies’ offense struggled to sustain drives.

=== Duke ===
| | 1 | 2 | 3 | 4 | Total |
|---|---|---|---|---|---|
| #6 Virginia Tech Hokies | 14 | 7 | 14 | 10 | 45 |
| Duke Blue Devils | 0 | 0 | 0 | 0 | 0 |

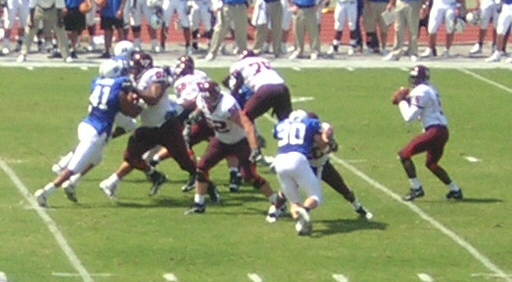
Marcus Vick drops back to pass against Duke

Seventh-ranked Virginia Tech recorded its first ACC win of the season with a 45–0 road victory over Duke, holding the Blue Devils to just 35 total yards—the fewest allowed by a Hokie defense since before 1950. Virginia Tech scored in all three phases, including a defensive touchdown and a special teams field goal, while limiting Duke to two first downs and forcing nine punts.

Marcus Vick threw three touchdown passes, connecting with Jeff King from 7 yards, Josh Morgan from 37 yards, and David Clowney from 35 yards out. The Hokies also scored on a 23-yard interception return by Roland Minor in the first quarter. George Bell and Branden Ore each added rushing touchdowns—Bell from 3 yards in the third quarter and Ore from 4 yards in the fourth. Brandon Pace contributed a 31-yard field goal midway through the final period.

Vick completed 12 of 19 passes for 172 yards and three touchdowns, with no interceptions. Ore led the rushing attack with 51 yards and a touchdown on 11 carries in his collegiate debut, while Morgan was the leading receiver with 84 yards and a score on three catches. Defensively, James Anderson recorded five tackles and a sack, and the Hokies forced two turnovers while holding Duke to minus-3 rushing yards.

=== Ohio ===
| | 1 | 2 | 3 | 4 | Total |
|---|---|---|---|---|---|
| Ohio Bobcats | 0 | 0 | 0 | 0 | 0 |
| #5 Virginia Tech Hokies | 3 | 14 | 14 | 14 | 45 |

Playing the first time in the newly expanded Lane Stadium, fourth-ranked Virginia Tech blanked Ohio 45–0 in its home opener, the second straight 45-0 shutout of the season. The Hokies were slow to start offensively, managing only a 35-yard field goal by Brandon Pace in the first quarter and gaining just 158 yards in the first half. Ohio’s defense, which had scored twice in an upset win over Pittsburgh the previous week, forced two three-and-outs and kept the game close until late in the second quarter.

Virginia Tech broke through with a pair of second-quarter touchdowns: Cedric Humes scored on a 1-yard run, and Marcus Vick connected with Jeff King for a 28-yard touchdown pass. Ohio’s only scoring opportunity came on a drive that reached the Hokies’ 20-yard line, but kicker Jonathon Greene missed a field goal attempt.

In the second half, the Hokies scored touchdowns on four of their first five possessions. Vick added a 4-yard rushing touchdown and threw a 3-yard scoring pass to Jesse Allen in the third quarter. Humes later broke free for a 33-yard touchdown run, and backup quarterback Cory Holt capped the scoring with a 38-yard touchdown pass to John Kinzer in the fourth.

Vick completed 12 of 18 passes for 200 yards and two touchdowns, adding 38 rushing yards and a score. Humes led all rushers with 71 yards and two touchdowns on 11 carries, while King was the top receiver with three catches for 63 yards and a touchdown. On defense, Xavier Adibi recorded six tackles and a sack, and Roland Minor added an interception. The Hokies forced two turnovers and held Ohio to 10 first downs and 2-of-13 on third down conversions.

=== Georgia Tech ===
| | 1 | 2 | 3 | 4 | Total |
|---|---|---|---|---|---|
| #15 Georgia Tech Yellow Jackets | 0 | 0 | 7 | 0 | 7 |
| #4 Virginia Tech Hokies | 14 | 10 | 24 | 3 | 51 |

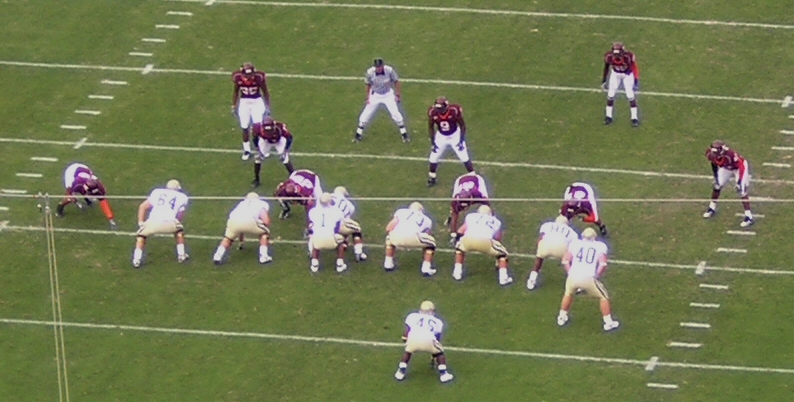
Hokie defense holds Georgia Tech to 7

Fourth-ranked Virginia Tech delivered a comprehensive 51–7 victory over No. 15 Georgia Tech at Lane Stadium, scoring in all three phases and forcing three turnovers. The Hokies built a 24–0 halftime lead and added three third-quarter touchdowns to put the game out of reach.

Marcus Vick threw a 13-yard touchdown pass to Jeff King and led scoring drives that set up two field goals by Brandon Pace (40 and 29 yards). Tailbacks Mike Imoh and Cedric Humes each rushed for touchdowns—Imoh from 7 yards out in the second quarter and Humes from 4 yards in the third. Virginia Tech’s defense contributed two interception returns for touchdowns: Xavier Adibi ran one back 25 yards, and Chris Ellis followed with a 29-yard score less than 30 seconds later. The Hokies also scored on special teams when D.J. Parker returned a blocked field goal 78 yards for a touchdown in the first quarter.

Georgia Tech’s lone score came on an 11-yard touchdown pass from Reggie Ball to Calvin Johnson in the third quarter. Ball, recovering from viral meningitis, completed 11 of 27 passes for 153 yards and two interceptions.

Vick finished 13-of-18 for 223 yards and a touchdown, adding 18 rushing yards. Imoh led the ground game with 74 yards and a score on 11 carries, while King caught four passes for 58 yards. On defense, Adibi and Ellis each recorded a pick-six, and Darryl Tapp added five tackles and a sack. Punter Nic Schmitt averaged 49.2 yards per kick, including a 61-yarder downed at the 1-yard line, while Jared Develli booted four touchbacks on eight kickoffs.

=== West Virginia ===
| | 1 | 2 | 3 | 4 | Total |
|---|---|---|---|---|---|
| #3 Virginia Tech Hokies | 10 | 14 | 3 | 7 | 34 |
| West Virginia Mountaineers | 0 | 14 | 3 | 0 | 17 |

Third-ranked Virginia Tech earned a 34–17 win over West Virginia at Milan Puskar Stadium, controlling the game with efficient offense and timely defensive stops. The Hokies scored on six of their first eight possessions and committed no turnovers, while the defense held the Mountaineers to 3 points after halftime.

Marcus Vick led the Hokies with a 10-yard touchdown run and threw scoring passes of 9 yards to Jeff King and 16 yards to Eddie Royal, helping Virginia Tech build a 24–14 halftime lead. Brandon Pace added field goals of 35 and 41 yards, and Cedric Humes capped the scoring with a 4-yard touchdown run early in the fourth quarter.

West Virginia responded in the second quarter with a pair of touchdown passes from Pat White: a 2-yard strike to Mike Villagrana and a 46-yard deep ball to Dorrell Jalloh. The Mountaineers added a 21-yard field goal by Pat McAfee in the third quarter but were unable to score again.

Vick completed 15 of 17 passes for 177 yards and two touchdowns, adding 74 rushing yards and a score on 12 carries. Humes led all rushers with 79 yards and a touchdown on 22 carries, while Royal caught four passes for 48 yards and a touchdown. Defensively, Xavier Adibi recorded seven tackles and a forced fumble, and Roland Minor added five tackles and a pass breakup. The Hokies outgained West Virginia 422 to 327 and ran 70 plays compared to 48 for the Mountaineers.

=== Marshall ===
| | 1 | 2 | 3 | 4 | Total |
|---|---|---|---|---|---|
| Marshall Thundering Herd | 0 | 7 | 0 | 7 | 14 |
| #3 Virginia Tech Hokies | 7 | 7 | 20 | 7 | 41 |

Virginia Tech improved to 6–0 with a 41–14 victory over the Marshall Thundering Herd at Lane Stadium, overcoming a slow start with a dominant second-half performance. The Hokies led just 14–7 at halftime before scoring 20 unanswered points in the third quarter to take control.

Virginia Tech opened the scoring with a 1-yard touchdown run by Marcus Vick in the first quarter. Branden Ore added a 1-yard touchdown run in the second, but Marshall responded with a 9-yard touchdown pass from Bernie Morris to Hiram Moore to cut the lead to 14–7. In the third quarter, Vick connected with David Clowney for a 1-yard touchdown pass, followed by a 43-yard scoring run from Ore. Later in the period, Vick and Clowney linked up again for a 32-yard touchdown. Cedric Humes capped the Hokies’ scoring with a 1-yard touchdown run in the fourth quarter. Marshall added a late touchdown on a 1-yard run by Morris with under two minutes remaining.

Vick completed 16 of 23 passes for 203 yards and two touchdowns, adding 74 rushing yards and a score. Ore led all rushers with 146 yards and two touchdowns on 19 carries, while Clowney caught four passes for 69 yards and two touchdowns. On defense, linebacker Xavier Adibi recorded a team-high 10 tackles and a sack, and the Hokies held Marshall to 196 total yards while forcing two turnovers.

=== Maryland ===
| | 1 | 2 | 3 | 4 | Total |
|---|---|---|---|---|---|
| #3 Virginia Tech Hokies | 0 | 7 | 7 | 14 | 28 |
| Maryland Terrapins | 0 | 3 | 0 | 6 | 9 |

Virginia Tech remained undefeated with a 28–9 Thursday night win over the Maryland Terrapins at Byrd Stadium, overcoming four turnovers and seven penalties to dominate the second half. The Hokies relied on a punishing ground game and a defense that held Maryland to 41 rushing yards and forced two turnovers.

Scoring began in the second quarter with an 8-yard touchdown run by Marcus Vick, capping a 10-play, 80-yard drive. Maryland responded with a 38-yard field goal by Dan Ennis, but Virginia Tech seized control after halftime. Mike Imoh scored on a 2-yard run early in the third quarter, then added a 10-yard touchdown in the fourth. Branden Ore followed with a 4-yard touchdown run to extend the lead to 28–3. Maryland added a late touchdown on a 10-yard pass from Sam Hollenbach to Derrick Fenner, but the Hokies stopped the two-point conversion attempt.

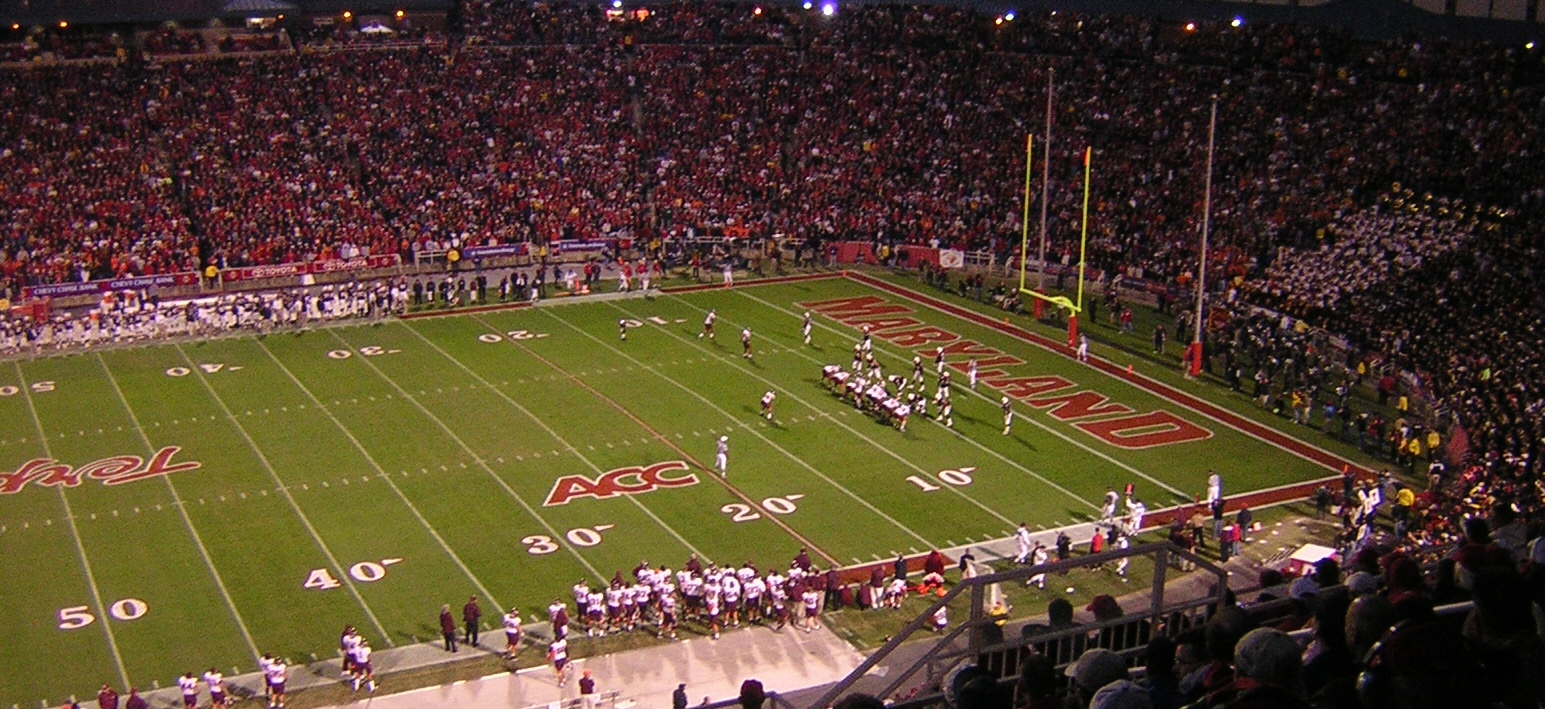
The Hokies take on Maryland at Byrd Stadium

Vick completed 13 of 20 passes for 129 yards and rushed for 54 yards and a touchdown. Imoh led all rushers with 107 yards and two scores on 16 carries, while Ore added 61 yards and a touchdown. David Clowney was the top receiver with four catches for 38 yards. On defense, linebacker Xavier Adibi recorded eight tackles and a forced fumble, and cornerback Jimmy Williams added six tackles and a pass breakup. The Hokies held Maryland to 196 total yards and just 2-of-13 on third down conversions.

=== Boston College ===
| | 1 | 2 | 3 | 4 | Total |
|---|---|---|---|---|---|
| #14 Boston College Eagles | 0 | 7 | 3 | 0 | 10 |
| #3 Virginia Tech Hokies | 6 | 14 | 0 | 10 | 30 |

Third-ranked Virginia Tech improved to 8–0 with a 30–10 Thursday night victory over No. 14 Boston College at Lane Stadium. The Hokies controlled the game with a balanced offense and a defense that forced two turnovers and scored a touchdown.

Virginia Tech opened the scoring in the first quarter with field goals of 26 and 32 yards by Brandon Pace. Boston College responded in the second quarter with a 29-yard touchdown pass from Quinton Porter to Will Blackmon, but the Hokies answered with a 15-yard touchdown run by Eddie Royal and a 3-yard touchdown pass from Marcus Vick to tight end Jeff King. A 26-yard field goal by BC’s William Troost narrowed the gap to 20–10 in the third quarter, but Virginia Tech sealed the win with a 31-yard field goal from Pace and a 13-yard interception return for a touchdown by cornerback Roland Minor in the fourth.

Vick completed 22 of 28 passes for 280 yards and one touchdown, adding 52 rushing yards. Royal led the team with 134 all-purpose yards, including 25 rushing, 45 receiving, and 64 on returns. Mike Imoh rushed for 60 yards on 16 carries, while King caught five passes for 58 yards and a score. On defense, Minor recorded five tackles and the game-clinching pick-six, while Darryl Tapp added six tackles and a sack. The Hokies outgained Boston College 492 to 174 and held the Eagles to 27 rushing yards.

=== Miami ===
| | 1 | 2 | 3 | 4 | Total |
|---|---|---|---|---|---|
| #5 Miami Hurricanes | 3 | 7 | 17 | 0 | 27 |
| #3 Virginia Tech Hokies | 0 | 0 | 0 | 7 | 7 |

Third-ranked Virginia Tech suffered its first defeat of the season in a 27–7 loss to No. 5 Miami at Lane Stadium. The Hurricanes controlled the game with a relentless defensive effort, forcing six turnovers and holding the Hokies scoreless through three quarters. Miami’s win snapped Virginia Tech’s eight-game winning streak and derailed its bid for a national title.

Miami took a 10–0 lead into halftime behind a 27-yard field goal from Jon Peattie and a 1-yard touchdown run by Charlie Jones. In the third quarter, the Hurricanes extended their lead with a 24-yard field goal, a 9-yard touchdown pass from Kyle Wright to Darnell Jenkins, and fumble recovered in the end zone for a touchdown by defensive lineman Kareem Brown after a strip sack of Marcus Vick. Virginia Tech’s only score came in the fourth quarter on a 2-yard touchdown run by Vick, set up by a short field following a defensive stop.

Vick completed 8 of 22 passes for 90 yards and threw two interceptions, while rushing for 7 yards and a touchdown on 17 carries. Branden Ore led the Hokies with 35 rushing yards on four carries, and Justin Harper was the top receiver with two catches for 33 yards. Defensively, James Anderson recorded eight tackles, and Darryl Tapp added six tackles and a quarterback hurry. The Hokies were outgained 306 to 199 and converted just 3-of-15 third downs.

=== Virginia ===
| | 1 | 2 | 3 | 4 | Total |
|---|---|---|---|---|---|
| #6 Virginia Tech Hokies | 7 | 17 | 28 | 0 | 52 |
| Virginia Cavaliers | 0 | 0 | 7 | 7 | 14 |

Virginia Tech, ranked sixth nationally, overwhelmed in-state rival Virginia 52–14 in Charlottesville, scoring touchdowns on seven of its first nine possessions and building a 24–0 halftime lead. The Hokies added four more touchdowns in the third quarter before coasting through the final period, securing their largest margin of victory in the rivalry since 1953.

Marcus Vick threw touchdown passes of 8 yards to Josh Morgan and 24 yards to Eddie Royal, and also led scoring drives that ended with a 32-yard field goal by Brandon Pace and a 1-yard touchdown run by Cedric Humes. In the third quarter, Humes added two more rushing touchdowns from 9 and 3 yards out, while Branden Ore scored on runs of 7 and 31 yards. Virginia responded with two rushing touchdowns by Wali Lundy—a 9-yard run midway through the third quarter and an 11-yard run early in the fourth—but never closed the gap.

Vick completed 15 of 22 passes for 203 yards and two touchdowns, adding 38 rushing yards. Humes led all rushers with 85 yards and three touchdowns on 20 carries, while Royal caught four passes for 65 yards and a score. On defense, Xavier Adibi recorded eight tackles and a sack, and Jimmy Williams contributed five tackles and a forced fumble. Virginia Tech outgained the Cavaliers 503 to 247 and held them to 3-of-13 on third down conversions.

=== North Carolina ===
| | 1 | 2 | 3 | 4 | Total |
|---|---|---|---|---|---|
| North Carolina Tar Heels | 0 | 3 | 0 | 0 | 3 |
| #5 Virginia Tech Hokies | 0 | 6 | 21 | 3 | 30 |

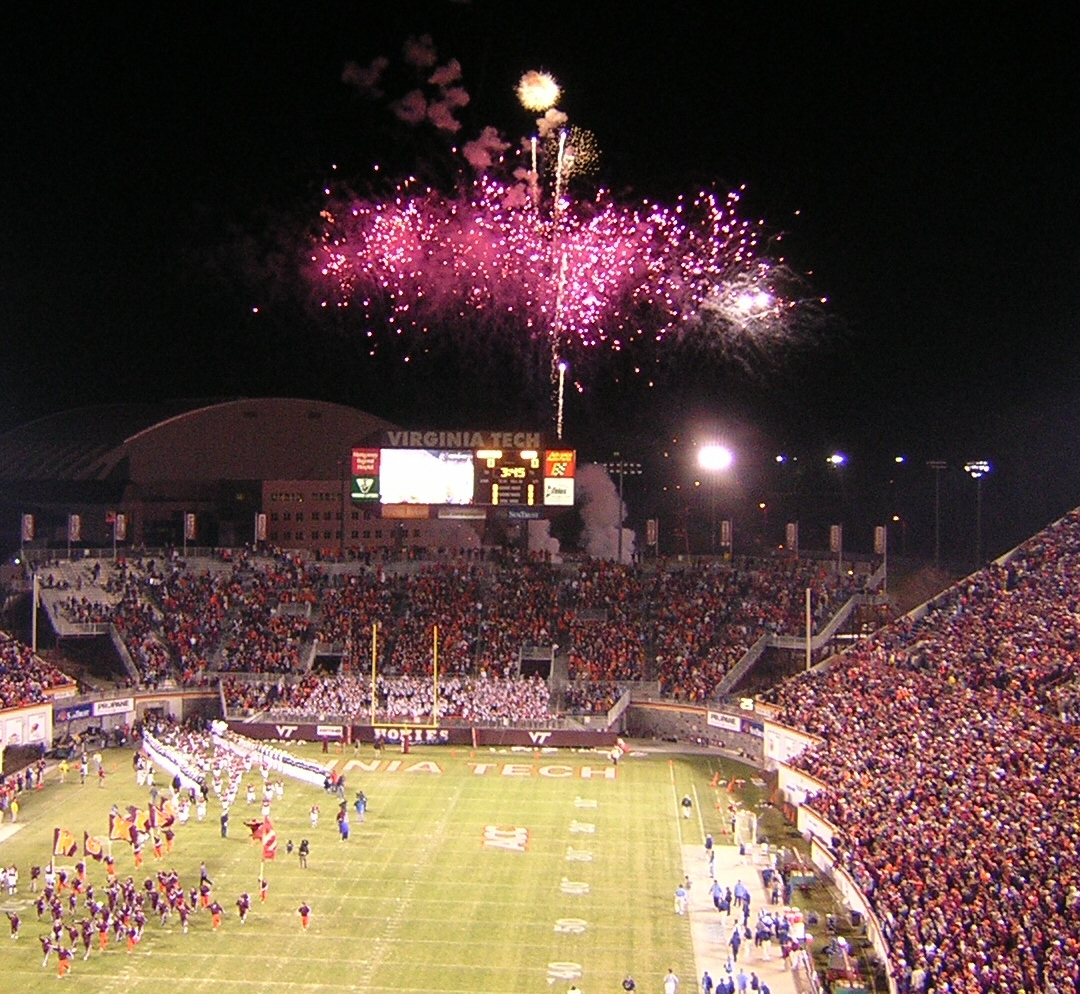
The Hokies take the field to face UNC

Fifth-ranked Virginia Tech clinched the ACC Coastal Division title with a 30–3 win over North Carolina in Blacksburg, using a dominant second-half ground game and a suffocating defense to turn a close contest into a rout. The Hokies led just 6–3 at halftime but outscored the Tar Heels 24–0 after the break, finishing the regular season at 10–1 overall and 7–1 in conference play.

Cedric Humes and Branden Ore combined for three rushing touchdowns in the third quarter, capitalizing on short fields and wearing down the North Carolina front. Humes scored from 1 and 3 yards out, while Ore added a 4-yard touchdown run. Earlier, Marcus Vick connected with Jeff King on a 1-yard touchdown pass in the second quarter, though the extra point was missed. Brandon Pace added a 44-yard field goal in the fourth quarter to cap the scoring. North Carolina’s only points came on a 25-yard field goal by Connor Barth just before halftime, set up by a turnover deep in Virginia Tech territory.

Vick completed 15 of 26 passes for 167 yards and a touchdown, while Humes led the rushing attack with 110 yards and two scores on 20 carries. Ore contributed 61 yards and a touchdown on 13 attempts. David Clowney paced the receiving corps with four catches for 61 yards. Defensively, Vince Hall recorded nine tackles and a sack, while the Hokies held North Carolina to 189 total yards and forced two turnovers. The Tar Heels converted just 2 of 13 third downs and failed to score on their final seven possessions.

=== Florida State ===
| | 1 | 2 | 3 | 4 | Total |
|---|---|---|---|---|---|
| #5 Virginia Tech Hokies | 3 | 0 | 0 | 19 | 22 |
| Florida State Seminoles | 3 | 0 | 24 | 0 | 27 |

Fifth-ranked Virginia Tech fell short in the inaugural ACC Championship Game, losing 27–22 to Florida State in Jacksonville despite a late rally that included three fourth-quarter touchdowns. The Seminoles capitalized on a dominant third quarter and a special teams touchdown to secure the conference title.

Florida State broke a 3–3 halftime tie with a 24-point outburst in the third quarter, including a 15-yard touchdown run by Leon Washington and a 1-yard scoring pass from Drew Weatherford to Lorenzo Booker. The turning point came on special teams when Willie Reid returned a punt 83 yards for a touchdown, giving the Seminoles a commanding lead. Virginia Tech responded with three touchdowns in the final period—Marcus Vick threw a 25-yard touchdown pass to David Clowney and ran for two short scores—but the deficit proved too large to overcome.

Vick completed 26 of 52 passes for 335 yards with one touchdown and one interception, adding 11 rushing yards and two scores on 17 carries. Clowney led all receivers with 6 catches for 117 yards and a touchdown, while Eddie Royal added 6 receptions for 79 yards. The Hokies struggled on the ground, finishing with just 41 rushing yards on 31 attempts. Defensively, Vince Hall recorded 10 tackles and a sack, and Darryl Tapp added 7 tackles and 2 quarterback hurries. Virginia Tech outgained Florida State 376 to 302 but committed two turnovers and allowed a special teams touchdown that proved decisive.

=== Louisville ===
| | 1 | 2 | 3 | 4 | Total |
|---|---|---|---|---|---|
| Louisville Cardinals | 14 | 3 | 0 | 7 | 24 |
| #5 Virginia Tech Hokies | 3 | 7 | 3 | 22 | 35 |

No. 12 Virginia Tech closed its season with a 35–24 victory over No. 15 Louisville in the Gator Bowl, rallying from an early deficit with a balanced offensive attack and a decisive fourth-quarter surge. The Hokies scored 22 unanswered points in the final period to overcome a 17–13 deficit and finish the year at 11–2.

Marcus Vick threw touchdown passes of 33 yards to Justin Harper and 24 yards to David Clowney, and added a 1-yard rushing score in the fourth quarter. Cedric Humes powered the ground game with 113 yards and a touchdown on 20 carries, including a 24-yard scoring run that gave Virginia Tech its first lead of the second half. The Hokies also capitalized on a defensive touchdown when James Anderson returned a fumble 24 yards for a score after a Louisville miscue deep in its own territory.

Louisville built a 14–3 lead in the first quarter behind touchdown passes of 11 and 39 yards from Hunter Cantwell to Mario Urrutia and Joshua Tinch, respectively. Art Carmody added a 29-yard field goal in the second quarter, and the Cardinals briefly regained the lead in the fourth with a 1-yard touchdown run by Kolby Smith before Virginia Tech’s closing run.

Vick completed 15 of 26 passes for 203 yards and two touchdowns, with one interception. Clowney led all receivers with 6 catches for 130 yards and a score, while Harper added 3 receptions for 64 yards and a touchdown. On defense, Anderson recorded 6 tackles and a fumble return touchdown, and Vince Hall contributed 10 tackles and a sack. The Hokies outgained Louisville 438 to 391 and forced two turnovers, including the pivotal fourth-quarter fumble that sealed the win.

== Personnel ==
=== Coaching staff ===
| Position | Name | First year at VT | First year in current position |
|---|---|---|---|
| Head coach | Frank Beamer | 1987 | 1987 |
| Associate head coach and running backs coach | Billy Hite | 1978 | 2001 |
| Offensive coordinator and offensive line | Bryan Stinespring | 1990 | 2002 |
| Defensive coordinator and inside linebackers | Bud Foster | 1987 | 1995 |
| Wide receivers | Tony Ball | 1998 | 1998 |
| Strong safety, Outside linebackers, and Recruiting Coordinator | Jim Cavanaugh | 1996 | 2002 |
| Quarterbacks | Kevin Rogers | 2002 | 2002 |
| Tight ends and Offensive tackles | Danny Pearman | 1998 | 1998 |
| Defensive backs | Lorenzo Ward | 1999 | 1999 |
| Defensive line | Charley Wiles | 1996 | 1996 |

=== Roster ===
| Quarterback: 3 Ike Whitaker – (redshirt) Freshman; **5 Marcus Vick** – RS Junior; 7 Sean Glennon – (redshirt) Sophomore; 8 Greg Boone – (redshirt) Freshman; 12 Cory Holt – RS Freshman; Tailback: Elan Lewis – (redshirt) Freshman; **20 Mike Imoh** – Senior; 28 Branden Ore – RS Freshman; **32 Cedric Humes** – RS Senior; 34 George Bell – RS Freshman; 44 John Candelas – Senior; Flanker: Justin Born – Sophomore; **4 Eddie Royal** – Sophomore; ~~82 Jeremy Gilchrist – RS Freshman~~; Split end: Brandon Dillard – (redshirt) Freshman; Michael Reid – Freshman; 17 Josh Morgan – Sophomore; 19 Josh Hyman – RS Sophomore; 81 Justin Harper – Sophomore; **87 David Clowney** – Junior; Fullback: Kenny Jefferson – (redshirt) Freshman; Billy Gorham – Sophomore; Devin Perez – RS Freshman; **37 Jesse Allen** – RS Junior; 39 Carlton Weatherford – RS Sophomore; Tight end: **43 John Kinzer** – RS Sophomore; 83 Sam Wheeler – (redshirt) Freshman; 85 Ed Wang – (redshirt) Freshman; **90 Jeff King** – RS Senior; Offensive guard: Zac Lowe – Junior; 51 Matt Welsh – RS Freshman; **61 Reggie Butler** – Senior; 62 Rashad Ferebee – Senior; 63 Antonio North – (redshirt) Freshman; 65 Robert Norris – (redshirt) Freshman; **66 Will Montgomery** – RS Senior; **72 Jason Murphy** – RS Senior; 77 Brandon Gore – RS Senior | Offensive tackle: Mason Baggett – RS Junior; Watson Stelly – Sophomore; **52 Jimmy Martin** – Senior; 64 Richard Graham – (redshirt) Freshman; 67 Nick Marshman – RS Freshman; 74 Brandon Frye – RS Junior; **76 Duane Brown** – RS Sophomore; 79 Eric Davis – (redshirt) Freshman; Center: ~~57 Tripp Carroll – RS Sophomore~~; 58 Ryan Shuman – RS Freshman; **66 Will Montgomery** – RS Senior; **69 Danny McGrath** – RS Junior; Defensive tackle: Hivera Green – (redshirt) Freshman; Cordarrow Thompson – (redshirt) Freshman; Scott King – Sophomore; **56 Jonathan Lewis** – Senior; 59 Barry Booker – RS Sophomore; 60 Chris Burnett – RS Junior; **71 Tim Sandidge** – RS Senior; 75 Kory Robertson – RS Sophomore; **99 Carlton Powell** – RS Sophomore; Defensive end: Chad Carlson – Freshman; Greg Kezmarsky – Senior; 41 Jordan Trott – RS Senior; **49 Chris Ellis** – RS Sophomore; **55 Darryl Tapp** – Senior; 72 Matt Tilley – Freshman; 90 Orion Martin – RS Freshman; 94 William Wall – (redshirt) Freshman; **96 Noland Burchette** – RS Junior; Linebacker: Cody Grimm – (redshirt) Freshman; Jonas Houseright – RS Freshman; Mark Muncey – (redshirt) Freshman; Dustin Pickle – Freshman; Demetrius Taylor – (redshirt) Freshman; 6 Andrew Bowman – RS Freshman; **9 Vince Hall** – RS Sophomore; **11 Xavier Adibi** – RS Sophomore; 13 Corey Gordon – RS Sophomore; 29 Chad Grimm – Junior; 33 Brett Warren – Sophomore; ~~35 Stevie Ray Lloyd – RS Sophomore~~; 40 Blake Warren – RS Senior; **42 James Anderson** – RS Senior | Free Safety: Jake Patten – Junior; ~~22 Robert Parker – RS Junior~~; **25 D.J. Parker** – Sophomore; 26 Kent Hicks – RS Freshman; **27 Justin Hamilton** – RS Senior; 31 Brendan Hill – RS Junior; 48 Cam Martin – (redshirt) Freshman; Rover: Jake Patten – Junior; Matt Reidy – (redshirt) Freshman; 30 Cary Wade – RS Junior; **36 Aaron Rouse** – RS Junior; 45 Purnell Sturdivant – RS Freshman; Cornerback: Jahre Cheeseman – (redshirt) Freshman; Brian McPherson – RS Junior; 1 Victor Harris – Freshman; **2 Jimmy Williams** – Senior; **15 Roland Minor** – RS Sophomore; 18 Brandon Flowers – RS Freshman; 21 Ryan Hash – RS Junior; 24 Dorian Porch – (redshirt) Freshman; ~~47 Theodore Miller – RS Freshman~~; 48 Cory Price – Junior; Long snapper: Cory Byrd – Freshman; **53 Nick Leeson** – RS Junior; 54 Bart McMillin – RS Sophomore; Punter: **23 Nic Schmitt** – RS Junior; 97 Brent Bowden – Redshirting; **Place kicker**: John Hedge – RS Junior; **46 Brandon Pace** – RS Junior; 92 Jud Dunlevy – RS Sophomore; 98 Jared Develli – Sophomore |
Starters are in **bold** and players who left the team are ~~struck out~~ (redshirt) Players who sat out during 2005 ("redshirted") are indicated with a "red shirt" icon

=== Marcus Vick ===
Marcus Vick's statistics
| Game | Passing | TDs | Int | Rushing | TDs |
|---|---|---|---|---|---|
| NC State | 10-21 (139 yards) | 1 | 0 | 21 – 31 | 0 |
| Duke | 12-19 (172 yards) | 3 | 1 | 4 – (-12) | 0 |
| Ohio | 12-16 (200 yards) | 2 | 0 | 13 – 38 | 1 |
| Georgia Tech | 13-18 (223 yards) | 1 | 0 | 7 – 0 | 0 |
| West Virginia | 15-17 (177 yards) | 2 | 0 | 12 – 74 | 1 |
| Marshall | 11-16 (163 yards) | 1 | 1 | 6 – 3 | 0 |
| Maryland | 14-23 (211 yards) | 0 | 3 | 16 – 133 | 1 |
| Boston College | 22-28 (280 yards) | 1 | 0 | 13 – 52 | 0 |
| Miami | 8-22 (90 yards) | 0 | 2 | 17 – 7 | 1 |
| Virginia | 15-21 (170 yards) | 2 | 1 | 9 – 32 | 0 |
| North Carolina | 8-15 (61 yards) | 1 | 1 | 7 – 1 | 0 |
| Florida State | 26-52 (335 yards) | 1 | 1 | 17 – 11 | 2 |
| Louisville | 11-22 (203 yards) | 2 | 0 | 13 – 10 | 0 |
Source: NCAA Player Statistics

With the departure of three-year starting quarterback Bryan Randall, the Hokies found themselves with questions at the quarterback position. Marcus Vick, who had seen limited action in 2003, before being suspended for the 2004 season for off-field transgressions, entered spring practice as the #3 quarterback on the depth chart behind Sean Glennon and Cory Holt.

In the spring game, Vick completed 9 of his 17 passes for 107 yards and he was named the starter the next day.

After a rough first start against NC State, in which the offense managed just 232 yards, Vick showed improved poise and numbers through the next several games.

During the West Virginia game, Vick made an obscene gesture towards the Mountaineer fans who had been chanting "rapist" and "child molester" at him. He later apologized for his conduct. Despite the incident, Vick was a near-perfect 15 of 17 passing against the Mountaineers and added 74 yards on the ground, including a 23-yard scramble as part of a fourth-quarter touchdown drive that would put the game out of reach.

Against Miami, Vick had the worst game of his career, turning the ball over six times and managing only one first half completion.

Following the loss to Florida State in the ACC championship game, the Hokies earned a trip to the Gator Bowl to face Louisville. During the second quarter of the game, as players were returning to the huddle after a play, Vick stomped on the left calf of Louisville defensive end Elvis Dumervil. He later claimed that the stomp was accidental, though replays show Vick appearing to deliberately aim for the leg. Vick stated that he apologized to Dumervil after the game, though Dumervil denied that any apology had been offered.

Steve Usecheck, the Big 12 Conference referee who headed the Gator Bowl officiating crew, stated that the officiating crew missed the stomp and would have ejected Vick if it had been seen.

The following week, it was revealed that Vick had been cited for speeding and driving with a suspended license. University President Charles Steger decided to dismiss Vick from the team and Vick then decided to declare for the NFL draft.
