= 2005 Sugar Bowl =

2005 Nokia Sugar Bowl
- BCS Bowl Game; 71st Sugar Bowl
Virginia Tech Hokies	Auburn Tigers
(10–2)	(12–0)
ACC	SEC
13	16
Head coach: Frank Beamer	Head coach: Tommy Tuberville
AP / Coaches / BCS; 9 / 9 / 8	AP / Coaches / BCS; 3 / 3 / 3
	1	2	3	4	Total
Virginia Tech	0	0	0	13	13
Auburn	6	3	7	0	16
- Date: January 3, 2005
- Season: 2004
- Stadium: Louisiana Superdome
- Location: New Orleans, Louisiana
- MVP: Auburn QB Jason Campbell
- Favorite: Auburn by 7
- National anthem: Brad Arnold
- Referee: Dick Honig (Big Ten)
- Halftime show: Bowl Games of America
- Attendance: 77,349

United States TV coverage
- Network: ABC
- Announcers: Mike Tirico, Tim Brant, Terry Bowden, and Suzy Shuster
- Nielsen ratings: 9.5

The 2005 Sugar Bowl was a postseason American college football bowl game between the Virginia Tech Hokies and the Auburn Tigers at the Louisiana Superdome in New Orleans, Louisiana, on January 3, 2005. It was the 71st edition of the annual Sugar Bowl football contest. Virginia Tech represented the Atlantic Coast Conference (ACC) in the contest, while Auburn represented the Southeastern Conference (SEC). In a defensive struggle, Auburn earned a 16–13 victory despite a late-game rally by Virginia Tech.

Virginia Tech was selected as a participant in the game after winning the ACC football championship during the team's first year in the conference. Tech, which finished 10–2 in the regular season prior to the Sugar Bowl, defeated 16th-ranked Virginia and ninth-ranked Miami en route to the game. Auburn finished the regular season undefeated at 12–0. The Tigers defeated fourth-ranked LSU and fifth-ranked Georgia during the course of the season, and were one of five teams to finish the regular season undefeated; the others were Southern California, Oklahoma, Utah, and Boise State, with USC and Oklahoma being selected to play in the Bowl Championship Series national championship game. Auburn, by virtue of its lower ranking in the BCS poll, was left out of the national championship and was selected to play in the Sugar Bowl.

Pre-game media coverage of the game focused on Auburn being left out of the national championship game, a point of controversy for Auburn fans in the weeks leading up to the game. Much was made of that and the success of Auburn running backs Carnell Williams and Ronnie Brown, each of whom was considered among the best at his position. On the Virginia Tech side, senior quarterback Bryan Randall had a record-breaking season. Both teams also had high-ranked defenses, and Tech's appearance in the 2000 Sugar Bowl also was mentioned in the run-up to the game.

The 2005 Sugar Bowl kicked off on January 3, 2005, at 8:00 p.m. EST. Early in the first quarter, the Tigers took a 3–0 lead. Following an interception by the Auburn defense, the Tigers were extended their lead to 6–0. In the second quarter, another field goal resulted in three points for the Tigers. At halftime, Auburn led, 9–0. Auburn opened the second half with its only touchdown drive of the game, giving Auburn a 16–0 lead, which it held into the fourth quarter. In that quarter, Tech scored its first touchdown of the game but did not convert the two-point try, making the score 16–6. Late in the quarter, Tech quarterback Bryan Randall cut Auburn's lead to 16–13 on an 80-yard pass that resulted in another touchdown. With almost no time remaining in the game, Virginia Tech attempted an onside kick to have another chance on offense. When Auburn recovered the kick, the Tigers ran out the clock and secured the win. In recognition of his game-winning performance, Auburn quarterback Jason Campbell was named the game's most valuable player.

Despite Auburn's victory and undefeated season, they were not named national champions. That honor went to the University of Southern California, which defeated Oklahoma in the 2005 national championship game, 55–19. Three voters in the final Associated Press poll of the season voted Auburn the number one team in the country, but their votes were not enough to deny USC a national championship, as voted by members of the Associated Press and Coaches' polls. Several players from each team were selected in the 2005 NFL draft and went on to careers in the National Football League.

== Team selection ==
Virginia Tech and Auburn each earned automatic spots in a BCS bowl game due to their status as conference champions, and were selected by the 2005 Sugar Bowl. Virginia Tech finished the season 10–2 and was named ACC football champion its first year in the conference. Auburn, meanwhile, finished the season undefeated at 12–0, and was named champion of the SEC. Controversy erupted around Auburn's selection, as the Tigers had been denied a spot in the national championship game in favor of two other undefeated teams: the University of Southern California (USC) and Oklahoma.

=== Virginia Tech ===
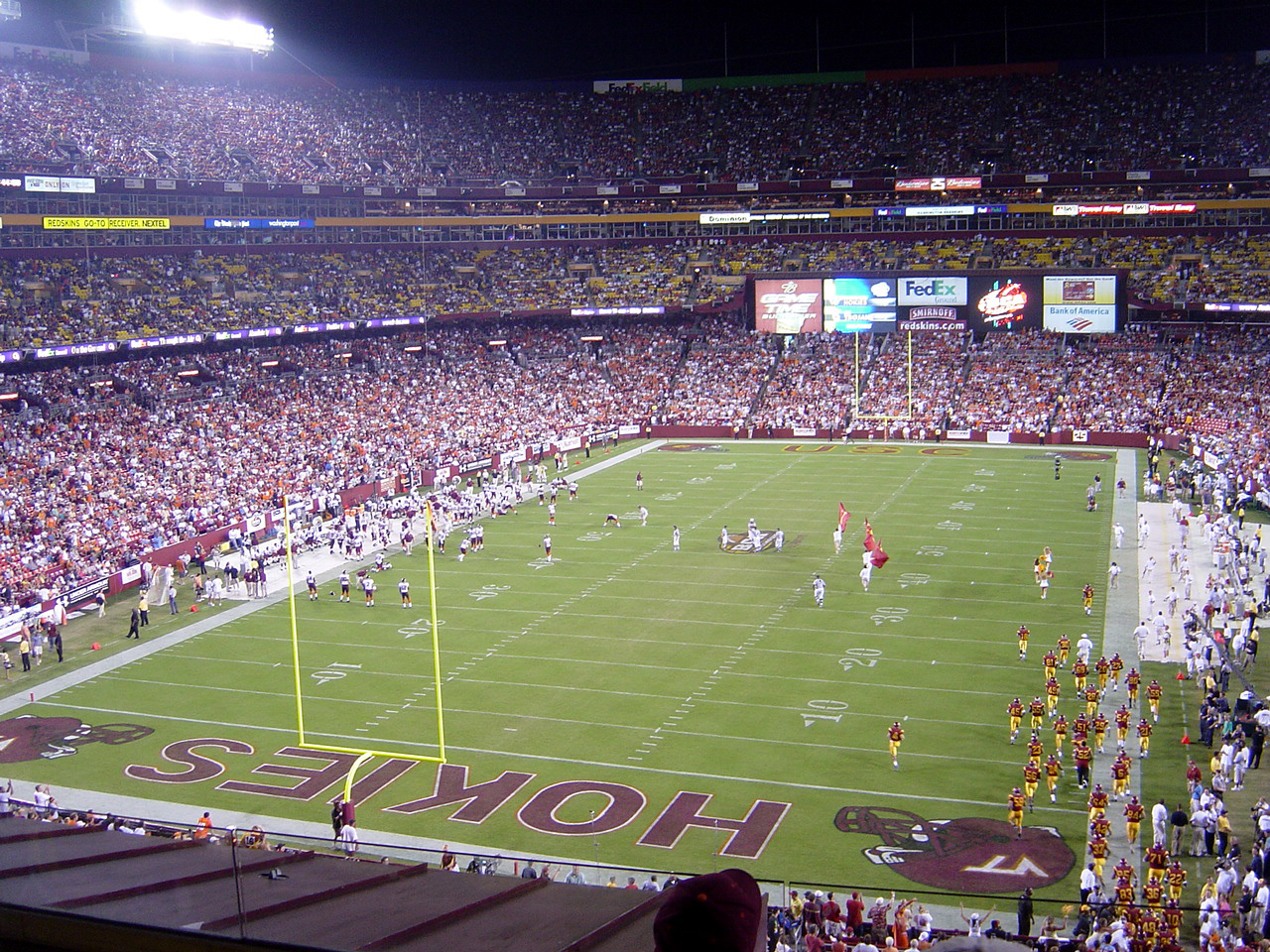
Virginia Tech began the 2004 college football season with a game against the No. 1-ranked USC Trojans. They lost, 13–24.

The Virginia Tech Hokies entered the 2004 college football season having gone 8–5 in 2003, culminating with a 52–49 loss to California in the 2003 Insight Bowl. The 2003 season had also been Virginia Tech's final year in the Big East Conference, and Tech began the new season in the Atlantic Coast Conference. Tech started the season unranked for the first time since 1998, and was picked to finish sixth (out of 11 ACC teams) in the annual ACC preseason poll, held in July. The Hokies' first game in their new conference was a non-conference contest at FedEx Field in Landover, MD. against the top-ranked USC Trojans. Tech lost, 24–13, but recovered to win its next game—against lightly regarded Western Michigan—in blowout fashion, 63–0. In its first conference game in the ACC, the Hokies beat Duke, 47–17, to improve to a 2–1 record. Their first win in the ACC was followed by their first loss, however, as the Hokies lost the next week to North Carolina State, 17–16, when Tech kicker Brandon Pace missed a last-second field goal.

Following the loss, Virginia Tech was 2–2 on the season, and faced the potential of being ineligible for a postseason bowl game if it did not improve its winning percentage. The Hokies won their next eight games, finishing the season with a 10–2 record. With late-season wins over perennial rival, 16th-ranked Virginia, and fellow ACC newcomer, ninth-ranked Miami, Virginia Tech clinched the ACC football championship (the last year in which it would be decided without a conference championship game) and a bid to a Bowl Championship Series game. Because the ACC's normal bowl destination, the Orange Bowl, was hosting the national championship game, Virginia Tech was selected to attend the Sugar Bowl in New Orleans, Louisiana, instead.

=== Auburn ===
Auburn, like Virginia Tech, had gone 8–5 during the 2003 college football season, and entered the 2004 season with high expectations. The Tigers were using a new offensive scheme—the West Coast offense—and boasted two highly rated running backs on offense. In its first game of the 2004 season, the 18th-ranked Auburn football team overwhelmed the University of Louisiana-Monroe, 31–0. It was Auburn's first shutout since 2002. One week later, the Tigers backed up their good start with an emphatic 43–14 victory over Southeastern Conference foe Mississippi State University. In the third week of the season, Auburn faced its first challenge of the young season, against the fourth-ranked Louisiana State Tigers. In a hard-fought defensive struggle, Auburn won, 10–9, when a missed extra point was replayed after a penalty.

After an easy 33–3 victory over The Citadel, Auburn faced eighth-ranked Tennessee. The Tigers' defense forced six turnovers en route to a 34–10 victory. With the victory over Tennessee, Auburn reeled off another four victories and became a prominent candidate for inclusion in the national championship game. In the 11th week of the season, Auburn faced the fifth-ranked Georgia Bulldogs. After a defensive effort that held Georgia scoreless until late in the fourth quarter, the third-ranked Tigers won a 24–6 victory. After defeating Alabama in their final regular-season game, Auburn entered the SEC championship game undefeated and in third place nationally. Although the Tigers defeated the Volunteers, 38–28, in the conference championship game, Auburn remained in third place because both USC and Oklahoma also remained undefeated. With USC and Oklahoma selected to play in the national championship game, Auburn was forced into the Sugar Bowl. With the winner of the BCS Championship Game guaranteed first place in the Coaches Poll, Auburn fans held hopes that the combination of an overwhelming Tigers victory in the Sugar Bowl with Oklahoma defeating USC with a weak performance would cause enough voters in the AP Poll to put Auburn ahead of Oklahoma in their final poll. The result would have been a split national championship similar to what occurred the previous season.

== Pregame buildup ==
In the weeks leading up to the game, media coverage of the game focused on Auburn's exclusion from the national championship game, a controversial point for Auburn fans and other observers in the weeks leading up to the game. In addition, both teams boasted high-ranked defenses that had performed well during the year. Much was made of that fact and the success of Auburn running backs Carnell "Cadillac" Williams and Ronnie Brown, each of whom were considered among the best players at their position. On the Virginia Tech side, senior quarterback Bryan Randall performed well for the Hokies during the regular season and was predicted to continue his success in the Sugar Bowl.

=== Rankings controversy ===
Shortly after the final pre-bowl game Bowl Championship Series standings were released on December 4, Auburn was among several teams disgruntled with the system. One of these was California, which only lost to top-ranked USC, but was denied a bid to the prestigious Rose Bowl after Texas vaulted it in the rankings despite having the same record. The Golden Bears were forced to attend the less-attractive Holiday Bowl instead. The Auburn Tigers, meanwhile, had completed their first 12-win regular season and won their first conference championship in 15 years, but in the final BCS rankings, Auburn was third, behind USC and Oklahoma. It was the first time since the creation of the BCS in 1998 that three major-conference college football teams were undefeated at the conclusion of the regular season. Some pundits and fans considered Auburn's failure to reach the championship game to be based on the fact that the Tigers had started with a lower ranking at the beginning of the season. The Tigers had been ranked 17th at the beginning of the season, while USC had been ranked first and Oklahoma second, the same spots they occupied at the end of the regular season.

Sportswriters also pointed to the Tigers' tougher conference schedule when compared to those of USC and Oklahoma. SEC commissioner Mike Slive remarked, "If Auburn goes through this league undefeated, they deserve to play for the national championship." Virginia Tech head coach Frank Beamer, in the runup to the game, seemingly agreed with the assessment, saying, "We started out playing Southern Cal and I believe this Auburn team is better." Some writers also indicated USC's five-point win—in which the Trojans struggled—over rival UCLA as an indicator that the Tigers could be the better team. In the end, such arguments were unable to sway voters, who ranked USC first, Oklahoma second, and Auburn third in all of the major polls decided by human voters. The Utes, who were also undefeated at the conclusion of the regular season, received limited attention because they were a member of a non-BCS conference.

Due to the controversy surrounding Auburn's failure to be given a chance to play for the national championship and controversies involving teams lobbying for improved ratings in the poll, the Associated Press sent a cease-and-desist order to BCS officials, forbidding them the use of the AP Poll in calculating BCS ratings.

=== Auburn offense ===
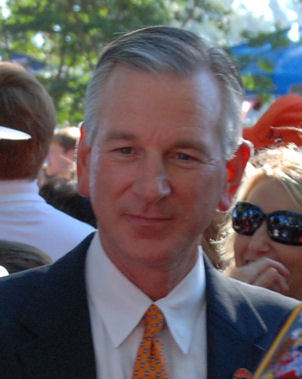
Auburn head coach Tommy Tuberville earned coach of the year honors prior to the Sugar Bowl.

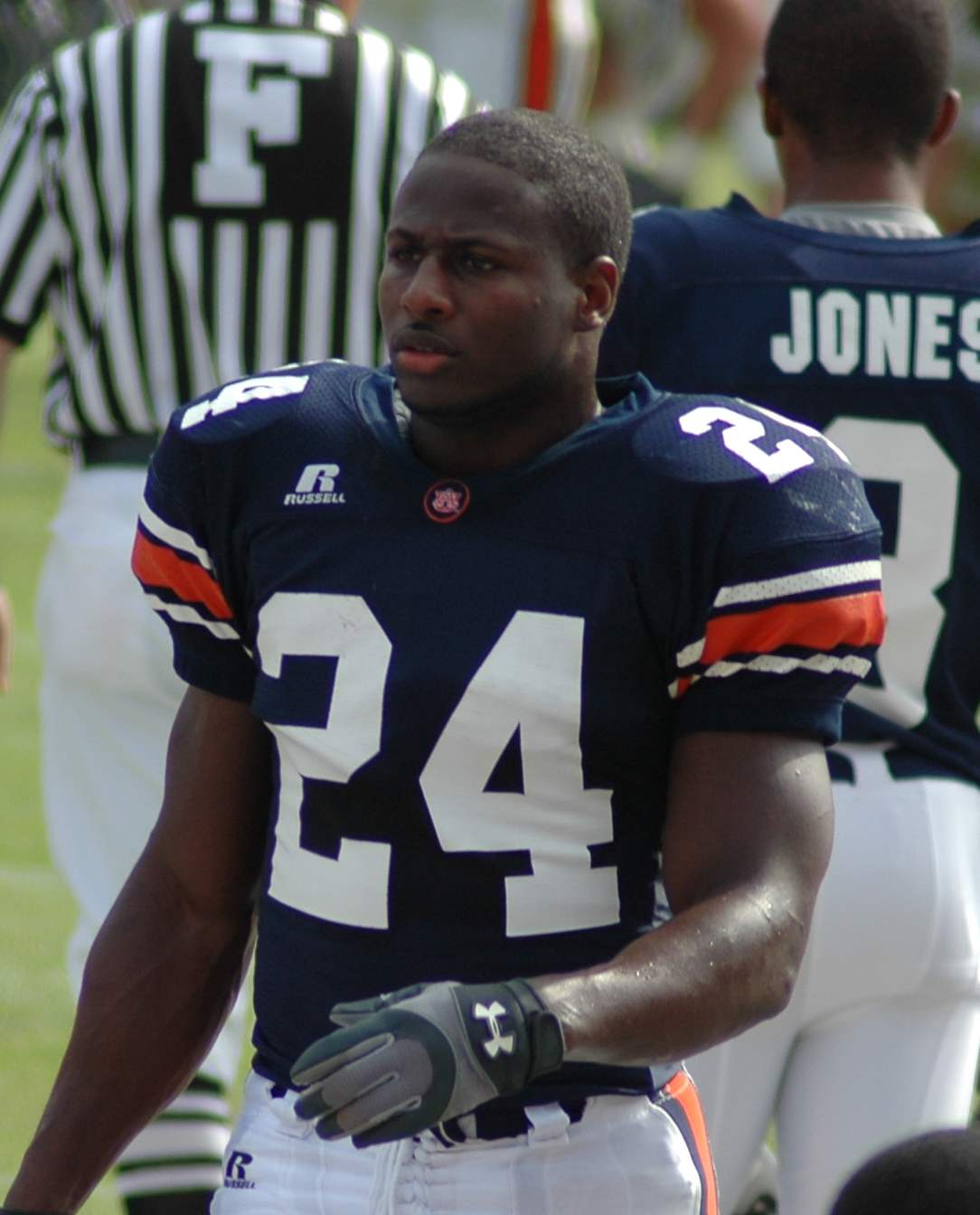
Auburn running back Carnell Williams was one of the stars of the Auburn offense during the 2004 season.

Auburn head coach Tommy Tuberville was named the Associated Press Coach of the Year on December 24, due in large part to his success in using Auburn's new West Coast offense to drive the Tigers to an undefeated 12–0 regular season. In response to his success, Auburn administrators agreed to a seven-year, $16 million contract extension with Tuberville prior to the Sugar Bowl. Tuberville planned an offense that finished the regular season averaging 33.4 points and 430.8 yards of total offense per game.

Heading Auburn's offense on the field was quarterback Jason Campbell. Campbell finished the regular season with 2,511 yards and 19 touchdowns, one short of tying the Auburn record for most touchdowns in a single season. Campbell was second in the Southeastern Conference in passing yards per game (209.2), and was a first-team All-SEC selection.

Auburn's rushing offense was led by two highly regarded running backs: Carnell Williams and Ronnie Brown. The two men, combined with quarterback Campbell, ran for 15,739 yards and 129 career touchdowns prior to the Sugar Bowl. Williams led the SEC in all-purpose yardage (137.2 yards per game) and average yards per punt return (11.7). He finished the regular season with 1,104 rushing yards and 13 touchdowns. The touchdown mark was the most recorded by a running back in the SEC that year. For his accomplishments, Williams was named a first-team All-SEC pick. Despite missing most of his first two seasons due to injuries, he ranked second on Auburn's all-time rushing list with 3,770 yards—behind only NFL and MLB star Bo Jackson. Williams also had the most rushing touchdowns in Auburn history (45) and was Auburn's leading scorer in school history (276 points). Brown accumulated 845 rushing yards and caught 34 passes for 314 yards during the season prior to the Sugar Bowl. He finished with eight touchdowns and was named a second-team All-SEC pick. His 34 receptions were 10 more than he earned in his first three seasons combined.

Despite the attention focused on Auburn's two star running backs, the team also boasted a capable corps of wide receivers as well. Prior to the game, Auburn receiver Ben Obomanu said, "When you have your running game making big plays and the defense has to load the box (defensive line) to make plays and try to stop the running game, that opens up things in the passing game." Auburn averaged more yards passing (241.4 per game) than running (189.4 per game).

=== Virginia Tech offense ===
Heading into the Sugar Bowl, the Virginia Tech offense was led by quarterback Bryan Randall, who completed 149 of 268 passes (55.6 percent) for 1,965 yards, 19 touchdowns, and seven interceptions. He also rushed for 466 yards and held Tech career records for total offense and passing yards. His 37 consecutive starts also are a school mark for a quarterback. In the preseason, Randall competed for the first-string quarterback spot with Marcus Vick until the latter was suspended from Tech for a semester after a criminal conviction. In the weeks leading up to the Sugar Bowl, Randall was named the Virginia Division I Offensive Player of the Year by the Roanoke Times and was named the ACC Player of the Year.

Tech's rushing offense featured two running backs who shared time on the field: Mike Imoh and Cedric Humes. During the regular season, Imoh rushed the ball 152 times for 704 yards, an average of 4.6 yards per carry. He scored four touchdowns and set a school record for rushing yards in a game when he ran for 243 yards in Virginia Tech's game against North Carolina. Humes was on the field slightly less than Imoh, but earned 595 yards and five touchdowns on 124 carries. Tech offensive tackle Jimmy Martin was expected to play in the game after recovering from a high ankle sprain.

On special teams, Tech's Jim Davis blocked three field goals during the regular season, and teammate Darryl Tapp blocked a punt. Tech's success on special teams was at least partially due to head coach Frank Beamer's emphasis on that aspect of the game, a strategy known as "Beamerball." Due to Tech's acumen on special teams, Auburn was forced to spend extra time in preparing its special teams to face Virginia Tech in the Sugar Bowl.

The Sugar Bowl was a homecoming for Tech punter Vinnie Burns, who played high school football 15 miles (24 km) from the Louisiana Superdome, site of the Sugar Bowl. In addition, Burns' father, Ronnie Burns, was a longtime Sugar Bowl committee member, and Vinnie committed to attend Virginia Tech while the Hokies were in New Orleans to play in the 2000 Sugar Bowl, that year's national championship game.

=== Auburn defense ===
Before the Sugar Bowl, Auburn had the top-ranked scoring defense in the country (allowing 11.2 points per game), the fifth-ranked total defense (allowing 269.5 total yards per game), eighth in passing defense (allowing 163 yards passing per game), and 16th in rushing defense (allowing 106.5 yards rushing per game). Cornerback Carlos Rogers was one of the key players on the defensive squad. Rogers, who won the Jim Thorpe Award—given annually to the best defensive back in the country—earned consensus All-America honors and was a finalist for the Bronco Nagurski Award and a semifinalist for the Chuck Bednarik Award, each given to the best defensive college football player in the United States.

Linebacker Travis Williams had the most tackles on the team during the regular season, finishing with 76. He also tied for third on the team in tackles for loss (nine), had two interceptions, two sacks, and was named a second-team All-SEC selection.

Senior safety Junior Rosegreen, freshman end Stanley McClover and junior nose guard Tommy Jackson were first-team all-SEC picks, signifying they were the best players at their position in the conference. Rosegreen had five interceptions during the regular season, including four in Auburn's game against Tennessee. That single-game performance tied the SEC record and set the Auburn record for the most interceptions in one game. Jackson finished the regular season with 49 tackles, six tackles for loss, and one sack.

Linebacker Antarrious Williams was scheduled to miss the game after undergoing surgery to repair a dislocated bone suffered in the Tigers' game against Georgia. Williams had 44 tackles during the regular season, and had been replaced by Derrick Graves in the SEC championship game. Graves was expected to do so again in the Sugar Bowl.

=== Virginia Tech defense ===
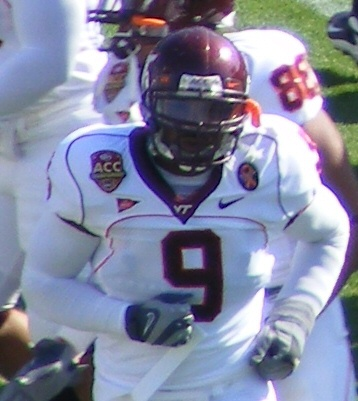
Linebacker Vince Hall was one of the stars of the Virginia Tech defense.

At the conclusion of the regular season, Virginia Tech's defense was ranked third nationally in scoring defense (12.6 points allowed per game), fourth in total defense (269.5 total yards allowed per game) and fifth in pass defense (149.8 passing yards allowed per game). The Tech defense featured two highly regarded cornerbacks, Jimmy Williams and Eric Green, who finished the regular season with 50 tackles and 31 tackles, respectively. Williams also had four interceptions (the most on the team), including one returned for a touchdown, and was named first-team All-ACC. Green, meanwhile, had one interception. Auburn wide receiver Courtney Taylor praised the two players highly in an interview before the game, saying, "Those cornerbacks are amazing to me every time I look at them. I think, 'God, those guys are very athletic.' We're going to have our hands full."

Linebacker Mikal Baaqee was first on the team in tackles, recording 63 during the regular season. Fellow linebacker Vince Hall ranked second, with 62.

On the defensive line, defensive tackle Jonathan Lewis was considered a key player. Though limited by a cast protecting a broken pinky finger suffered during Virginia Tech's game against Virginia, Lewis was expected to continue to perform well. Heading into the Sugar Bowl, Lewis had 38 tackles, including 10 tackles for loss and four sacks. Also on the defensive line was Darryl Tapp, who led the team in sacks, tackles for loss, and quarterback hurries. Tapp earned first-team All-ACC honors and had 55 tackles and one interception during the regular season.

== Game summary ==
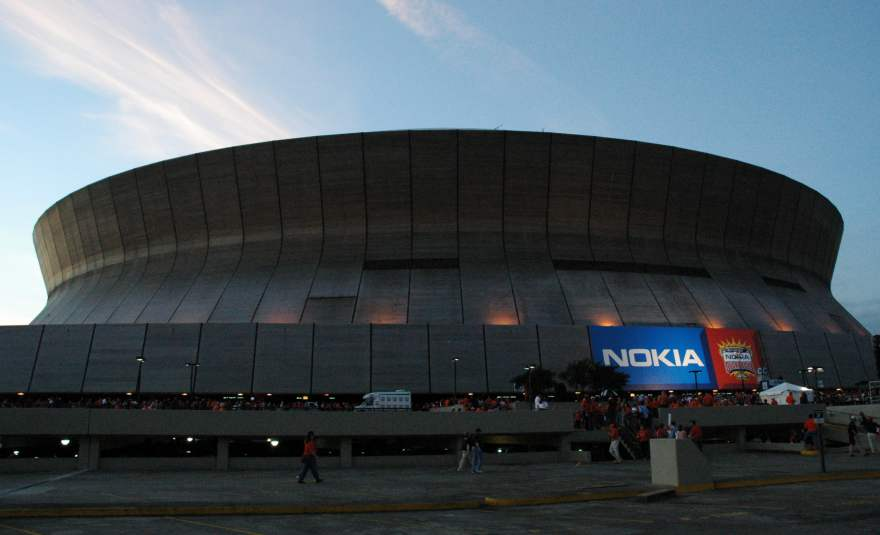
The Louisiana Superdome, home of the 2005 Sugar Bowl, as seen at sunset on the day of the game

The 2005 Sugar Bowl kicked off at 8:00 p.m. EST on January 3, 2005, in New Orleans, Louisiana. Official attendance was listed as 77,349. Mike Tirico, Tim Brant, Terry Bowden, and Suzy Shuster were the announcers for the television broadcast, which was aired on ABC. About 10 million households watched the game on television in the United States, giving the game a Nielsen rating of 9.5 and making it the 24th most popular Bowl Championship Series game in terms of television ratings. The game was also broadcast on ESPN Radio, and was commentated by Mark Jones, Bob Davie, and Holly Rowe. Spread bettors favored Auburn to win the game by seven points.

Pregame entertainment was provided by Bowl Games of America, a group composed of more than 2,000 performing-arts bands, dance teams, and cheer groups from across the United States. Together, they performed the song "God Bless America." The traditional pregame singing of the national anthem was sung by Brad Arnold from the band 3 Doors Down. Dick Honig was the referee, the umpire was Jim Krogstad, and the linesman was Brent Durbin.

=== First quarter ===
Following the ceremonial pre-game coin toss, Auburn elected to kick off to Virginia Tech to begin the game, ensuring the Tigers would have possession to begin the second half. Tech began the first drive of the game from its 20-yard line following a touchback. The Hokies initially had success moving the ball, as quarterback Bryan Randall rushed for seven yards on the game's first play, then completed a four-yard pass to wide receiver Eddie Royal two plays later for a first down. The Auburn defense recovered, however, and the Hokies did not gain another first down and were forced to punt. Auburn recovered the ball and began its first drive of the game from its 26-yard line. On the Tigers' first play, quarterback Jason Campbell threw a long pass to Cooper Wallace for 35 yards. This was followed by another long play as running back Ronnie Brown ran for 31 yards. After the initial shock of the Auburn offense, the Virginia Tech defense firmed up, and Auburn's next three plays were stopped for losses or minimal gains. Facing a fourth down at the Virginia Tech six-yard line, Auburn sent in kicker John Vaughn, who kicked a 23-yard field goal for the game's first points. With 8:35 remaining in the first quarter, Auburn took an early 3–0 lead.

Following the post-field goal kickoff, the Virginia Tech offense attempted to answer Auburn's quick score. Unfortunately for the Hokies, their second drive fared even worse than the first. Tech committed a 10-yard penalty, suffered an eight-yard loss on a play, then had a Bryan Randall pass intercepted by Auburn safety Junior Rosegreen. Rosegreen returned the ball 31 yards, and put Auburn's offense into good field position for its second drive of the game. Auburn also suffered an early penalty in its drive, but moved the ball with another long play—a 23-yard pass to Courtney Taylor—to recover. Again, however, the Virginia Tech defense recovered to force Auburn into a fourth down and a field goal attempt. Vaughn returned to the field and kicked a 19-yard field goal, giving Auburn a 6–0 lead with 1:06 remaining in the quarter.

With time in the quarter running out, Virginia Tech fielded the post-score kickoff and executed a quick series of plays, gaining a first down before time ran out. At the end of the first quarter, Auburn held an early 6–0 lead.

=== Second quarter ===
Virginia Tech began the second quarter in possession of the ball and driving down the field. Bryan Randall completed a 10-yard pass for another first down, but after Tech failed to gain another, the Hokies were forced to punt. Auburn reciprocated by going three and out and punting the ball back to Virginia Tech. In its first full drive of the second quarter, the Hokies had their best drive of the first half. After a holding penalty nullified a long kickoff return, Tech began at its 24-yard line. Randall completed a nine-yard pass to tight end Jeff King, then ran for another nine yards on a quarterback scramble. He followed the first-down run by completing three consecutive long passes of 16 yards, 13 yards, and 31 yards, respectively. The last pass, to wide receiver Josh Hyman, drove Virginia Tech inside the Auburn two-yard line. There, however, the Tech offense faltered. On three plays, Tech failed to cross the goal line, gaining only one yard in the process. Facing fourth down and needing just one yard for a touchdown, Virginia Tech head coach Frank Beamer elected to attempt to gain the touchdown, rather than send in his kicker for a field goal attempt. The attempted touchdown pass by Randall fell incomplete, and Virginia Tech turned the ball over on downs without scoring any points.

Auburn's offense took over at its one-yard line after Tech's failure to score. Jason Campbell orchestrated a successful drive that took Auburn from the shadow of its own end zone, completing passes of 16 yards, 15 yards, and 37 yards in the process. Inside the Virginia Tech red zone, however, the Auburn offense again stumbled. As it had in its two previous scoring drives, Auburn was forced to send in kicker John Vaughn despite being inside the Virginia Tech 10-yard line. Vaughn's 24-yard kick was successful, and with 1:50 remaining in the second quarter, Auburn extended its lead to 9–0.

With little time remaining before halftime, Virginia Tech used a hurry-up offense. Randall completed a 23-yard pass to Eddie Royal and ran for 22 yards on his own, but threw three consecutive incomplete passes to end the drive. Tech was forced to punt the ball away, and the first half came to an end. At halftime, Auburn led, 9–0.

=== Halftime ===
The halftime show was presented by Bowl Games of America, a collection of dance troupes, marching bands, and cheerleading squads from across the United States. Together, the organizations presented a pirate-themed show based on the character of Jean Lafitte, a noted brigand who lived in New Orleans—site of the game—during the War of 1812.

=== Third quarter ===
Because Virginia Tech received the ball to begin the game, Auburn received the ball to begin the second half. The Tigers started the first drive of the second half at their 22-yard line. Carnell Williams and Ronnie Brown alternated carries as Auburn gained 17 yards in their first three plays. Jason Campbell completed a pass for a five-yard loss, then, on the fifth play of the drive, completed a 53-yard pass to Anthony Mix. The pass was the longest play of the game, and drove the Tigers inside the Virginia Tech red zone. Three plays later, Campbell connected with Devin Aromashodu on a five-yard pass for the game's first touchdown. With 10:39 remaining in the third quarter, Auburn had taken a 16–0 lead.

After Auburn's kickoff, Virginia Tech started its first drive of the second half at its 20-yard line. Down by 16 points, Tech needed to score. The Hokies gained a quick first down, but a five-yard penalty and a sack of Bryan Randall prevented Tech from gaining another. The Hokies were forced to punt, and Auburn took over at its 44-yard line. Despite having good field position, the Tigers went three and out. Following the punt, Virginia Tech reciprocated by also going three and out. With 3:47 remaining in the quarter, Auburn began an offensive drive from its 35-yard line. From the beginning of the drive, however, the Tigers had problems. The first play of Auburn's drive was a 10-yard penalty against the Tigers. The second resulted in a one-yard loss by Ronnie Brown, who attempted to rush through the middle of the defensive line. On the third play, Virginia Tech cornerback Jimmy Williams intercepted an errant pass by Jason Campbell. Though Williams was unable to advance the ball, the Hokies still took over on offense, and with 2:38 remaining in the quarter, had their best field position since the first half.

The first play of the Tech drive resulted in a 12-yard gain as Josh Hyman rushed for 12 yards and a first down on an end-around. Running back Cedric Humes was stopped for a loss on the first play after Hyman's rush, but earned 10 yards on two subsequent rushes, setting up a fourth down. Needing one yard for a first down, behind by 16 points, and with time running down in the quarter, Tech head coach Frank Beamer elected to attempt the first down play rather than kick a field goal. Humes again rushed the ball, and as time ran out in the third quarter, picked up enough ground for the first down. With one quarter of play remaining, Auburn led Virginia Tech 16–0, but the Hokies had picked up a first down inside the Auburn 10-yard line to begin the fourth quarter.

=== Fourth quarter ===
Virginia Tech began the fourth quarter in possession of the ball, and facing a first down at the Auburn 10-yard line. In three consecutive plays, however, the Hokies only picked up a total of four yards. Needing six yards to get a touchdown, Virginia Tech sent in kicker Brandon Pace to attempt a 23-yard field goal. Despite the short distance, Pace missed the kick. With 13:56 remaining in the game, Auburn still held a 16–0 lead.

Following the missed field goal, Auburn took over on offense at its six-yard line—the point from which Tech had missed the kick. Ronnie Brown picked up 13 yards and a first down on three rushes. Carnell Williams then picked up three yards, and Jason Campbell threw a seven-yard pass that gave Auburn another first down. A five-yard penalty against Virginia Tech pushed Auburn's offense near midfield, and Ronnie Brown returned to the field, rushing the ball four consecutive times for 16 yards and driving the Tigers into Virginia Tech territory. Facing a fourth down and one yard, Auburn elected to give the ball to Brown again. On the one-yard run, however, Brown fumbled the ball, which was recovered by Virginia Tech's Mikal Baagee with 8:38 remaining.

Virginia Tech's offense came on to the field desperately needing to score quickly. Though the deficit was only 16 points, and could be made up with two touchdowns and two two-point conversions, the limited time remaining meant the task would be difficult, even if Virginia Tech scored quickly. The Hokies began the drive with a 17-yard pass by quarterback Bryan Randall. Justin Hamilton rushed for five yards, and Randall completed a six-yard pass for another first down. The Tigers helped matters by committing a 15-yard penalty, which put the Hokies inside Auburn territory. Three plays later, Randall capitalized on the opportunity by completing a 29-yard pass to Josh Morgan for a touchdown and the Hokies' first points of the game. Tech attempted a two-point conversion, but the pass attempt fell incomplete. With 6:57 remaining, Virginia Tech now trailed 16–6.

After receiving the post-touchdown kickoff, Auburn began to run out the clock. The Tigers failed to pick up a first down, and after going three and out, punted the ball back to Virginia Tech. The Hokies started their drive at their two-yard line, and Randall began it successfully by completing a 20-yard pass, rushing for 10 yards, then completing a five-yard pass to bring the Hokies near midfield. On the fourth play of the drive, however, Randall was intercepted by Auburn's Derrick Graves. The Tigers, their offense again on the field, began running out the clock again. Tech attempted to interrupt Auburn's clock management by calling timeouts after each play, stopping the clock with each timeout. Virginia Tech forced Auburn into a three and out, and the Tigers again punted the ball away with 2:13 remaining.

After the ball rolled into the end zone for a touchback, Virginia Tech began its final drive at its 20-yard line. On the first play of the drive, Bryan Randall completed an 80-yard touchdown pass to Josh Morgan. The score plus the extra point cut Auburn's lead to 16–13. With time in the game almost exhausted, Virginia Tech was forced to attempt an onside kick in order to have a chance to get another offensive drive. Because the Hokies had used their final timeouts to stop the clock on Auburn's previous drive, Auburn would be free to run out the game's final minutes. Despite the hopes of Virginia Tech for a last-second miracle, the Auburn Tigers recovered the kick, allowing them to run out the clock and clinch a 16–13 victory.

== Final statistics ==
Statistical comparison
	AU	VT
1st downs	14	19
Total yards	299	375
Passing yards	189	299
Rushing yards	110	76
Penalties	4–35	7–57
3rd down conversions	6–15	3–12
4th down conversions	0–0	1–2
Turnovers	2	2
Time of Possession	26:26	33:34

Auburn quarterback Jason Campbell completed 11 of 16 passes for 189 yards, one touchdown, and one interception, and was named the game's most valuable player. Despite his performance, he was neither the leading scorer on his team nor the overall best performer in the game. Auburn kicker John Vaughn was successful on all three of his field goal attempts and also succeeded on his sole extra point kick in the game, resulting in 10 Auburn points. On the opposite side of the ball, Virginia Tech quarterback Bryan Randall completed 21 of his 38 passes for 299 yards, two touchdowns, and two interceptions. Virginia Tech kicker Branden Pace missed his sole field goal attempt of the game, a 23-yard kick.

On the ground, Auburn running back Ronnie Brown led all rushers with 68 yards on 14 carries. Second was Auburn's Carnell Williams, who gained 61 yards on 19 carries. Bryan Randall was the Hokies' leading rusher, accumulating 45 yards on nine carries. Tech's two running backs, Mike Imoh and Cedric Humes, were stymied by the Auburn defense and managed just 26 yards on 12 combined carries. Virginia Tech wide receiver Josh Morgan finished the game with three receptions for 126 yards and two touchdowns, making him the game's most prolific receiver. Auburn's Courtney Taylor was second, with five catches for 87 yards, and Tech's Josh Hyman was third with five catches for 71 yards.

For the defense, Virginia Tech cornerback Jimmy Williams was the top performer. Williams had 10 tackles, including 3.5 tackles for loss, and one interception. Tech's Mikal Baaqee had eight tackles and one fumble recovery, making him the game's second-leading tackler. Auburn defender Derrick Graves was the most prolific tackler for the Tigers, making seven tackles and catching one interception of an errant Bryan Randall pass. Three players had one sack—two for Virginia Tech and one for Auburn.

== Postgame effects ==
With the win, Auburn finished the season undefeated, with 13 wins and zero losses. Virginia Tech's loss gave it a final record of 10–3.

The victory gave Auburn fans hope that if Oklahoma won the 2005 BCS National Championship Game, a split national championship would result. By contract, the winner of the BCS National Championship Game is voted number one in the USA Today Coaches' Poll. In contrast, the Associated Press poll has no such restriction. Auburn's thin margin of victory over Tech put the prospect of split national title in doubt, though not out of reach. USC's blowout 55–19 victory over Oklahoma, however, made it likely that USC would be the overwhelming choice for first place. When the final college football polls of the season were released, USC was voted number one by a large margin, though three voters in the Associated Press poll voted Auburn first. More than three years after the game, ESPN sportswriter Ted Miller rated the game second on his list of victims of the BCS system, just behind USC being left out of the championship game in 2003.

The Tigers lost 18 players due to graduation, and several juniors elected to enter the 2005 NFL draft as well. During the first round of the draft, Auburn had four players selected: Ronnie Brown, with the second overall pick, Carnell Williams (fifth), Carlos Rogers (ninth), and Jason Campbell (25th). Virginia Tech had three players selected in the 2005 draft: Eric Green (75th), Vincent Fuller (108th), and Jon Dunn (217th). Virginia Tech's appearance in the Sugar Bowl helped its recruiting efforts in the state of Virginia, with eight of the state's top recruits (ranked by the Roanoke Times newspaper), pledging to attend Tech.

The visiting fans of Auburn and Virginia Tech injected tens of millions of dollars into the New Orleans economy, despite high food, travel, and lodging costs that forced some fans to cut discretionary spending during their trips.

== See also ==
- Glossary of American football
