= Brandon Frye =

American football player (born 1983)

No. 76, 77
- Position: Offensive tackle

Personal information
- Born: January 23, 1983 (age 43); Myrtle Beach, South Carolina, U.S.
- Listed height: 6 ft 4 in (1.93 m)
- Listed weight: 305 lb (138 kg)

Career information
- High school: Myrtle Beach
- College: Virginia Tech
- NFL draft: 2007: 5th round, 163rd overall pick

Career history
- Houston Texans (2007–2008); Miami Dolphins (2008); Seattle Seahawks (2009)

Career NFL statistics
- Games played: 11
- Games started: 3
- Stats at Pro Football Reference

Brandon Lee Frye (born January 23, 1983) is an American former professional football player who was an offensive tackle in the National Football League (NFL). He was selected by the Houston Texans in the fifth round of the 2007 NFL draft. He played college football for the Virginia Tech Hokies.

Frye was also a member of the Miami Dolphins and Seattle Seahawks.

== College career ==
Frye played college football for the Virginia Tech Hokies. After playing sparingly his first three seasons, he earned the starting left job at the end of the 2005 season for the Toyota Gator Bowl against Louisville after Jimmy Martin was injured. He retained the starting job during the 2006 season and started all but two games his final year with the Hokies.

== Professional career ==
=== Houston Texans ===
Frye was selected by the Houston Texans in the fifth round, with the 163rd overall pick, of the 2007 NFL draft. He officially signed with the team on July 26. He was waived on September 1 and signed to the Texans' practice squad on September 3. Frye was promoted to the active roster on October 31, 2007. However, he did not appear in any games for the Texans and became a free agent after the 2007 season.

Frye re-signed with the Texans on March 28, 2008. He was waived on September 2 and signed to the practice squad on September 4, 2008.

=== Miami Dolphins ===
On November 5, 2008, Frye was signed to the Miami Dolphins' active roster off of the Texans' practice squad. He appeared in seven games for the Dolphins during the 2008 season. He was waived by the Dolphins on September 5, 2009.

=== Seattle Seahawks ===
Frye signed with the Seattle Seahawks September 6, 2009. He played in four games, starting three, for the Seahawks in 2009 before being placed on injured reserve on October 13, 2009. He became a free agent after the season.

== Personal life ==
He currently resides in the Washington, D.C. metro area.
