= Xavier Adibi =

American football player and coach (born 1984)

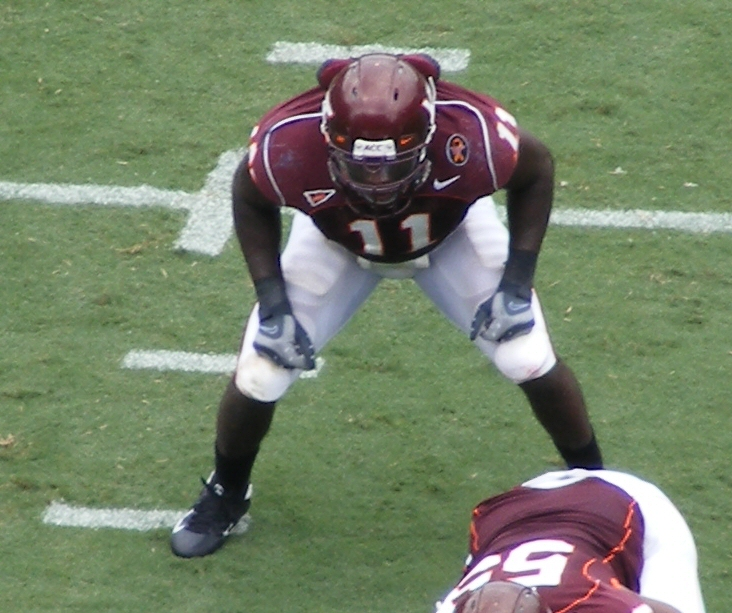
- Adibi at Virginia Tech

Colorado Buffaloes
- Title: Defensive analyst

Personal information
- Born: October 18, 1984 (age 42); Stillwater, Oklahoma, U.S.
- Listed height: 6 ft 2 in (1.88 m)
- Listed weight: 242 lb (110 kg)

Career information
- High school: Phoebus (Hampton, Virginia)
- College: Virginia Tech
- NFL draft: 2008: 4th round, 118th overall pick

Career history

Playing
- Houston Texans (2008–2010); Minnesota Vikings (2011); Chicago Bears (2012)*; Tennessee Titans (2012)
- * Offseason or practice squad member only

Coaching
- Garden City Linebackers coach; Arkansas (2018) Defensive analyst; Texas A&M–Commerce (2019–2021) Defensive coordinator; Virginia Tech (2022–2023) Defensive analyst; Virginia Tech (2024–2025) Associate linebackers coach; Colorado Buffaloes (2026–present) Defensive analyst

Awards and highlights
- PFWA All-Rookie Team (2008); First-team All-American (2007); First-team All-ACC (2007); Second-team All-ACC (2006)

Career NFL statistics
- Total tackles: 70
- Forced fumbles: 3
- Fumble recoveries: 1
- Stats at Pro Football Reference

Xavier Oyekola Adibi (born October 18, 1984) is an American football coach and former player. He is a defensive analyst at Colorado, and was previously the defensive coordinator at Texas A&M University–Commerce. He played college football at Virginia Tech. He was selected by the Houston Texans in the fourth round of the 2008 NFL draft and played professionally as a linebacker in the National Football League (NFL) with the Texans (2008–2010), Minnesota Vikings (2011), Chicago Bears (2012), and Tennessee Titans (2012). He was inducted into the Virginia Tech Sports Hall of Fame in 2021.

== Early life ==
Adibi attended and played high school football at Phoebus High School in Hampton, Virginia, and graduated in 2003.

He helped the Phantoms win their first state championship. Phoebus' first undefeated season came during Adibi's senior year where the Phantoms won their second consecutive state championship. Adibi rushed for 155 yards and four touchdowns in the 2002 state football game, while playing fullback, with future college teammate, D. J. Parker, as the quarterback.

Following his high school career, Adibi played in the 2003 U.S. Army All-American Bowl.

== College career ==
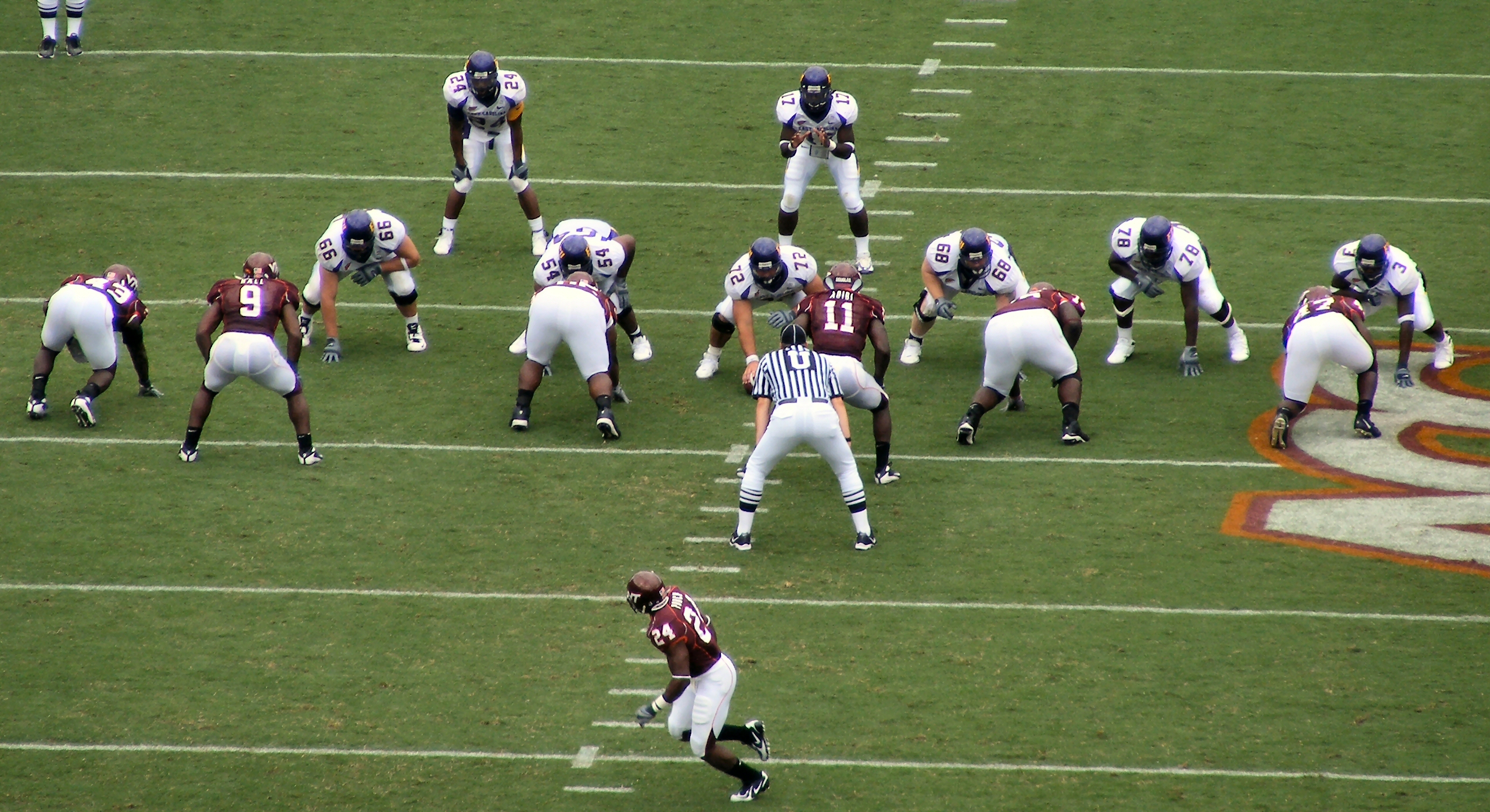
Adibi and the Hokie defense take on the East Carolina Pirates

Adibi played college football at Virginia Tech where he earned first team AFCA All-American and first team All-ACC honors in 2007, after earning second team All-ACC honors in 2006.

As a redshirt freshman in 2004, Adibi backed up Mikal Baquee. He was injured during the first game against USC and returned for a Thursday night game against Georgia Tech in Atlanta. Against Georgia Tech, Adibi had a prolific game, making eight tackles, including two sacks. He had a key game-saving sack on a Georgia Tech fourth quarter scoring drive. Georgia Tech had an opportunity to ice the game away, but Adibi's sack of Reggie Ball forced a field goal and kept it a one-score game, which Virginia Tech would ultimately rally to win.

Adibi earned the starting inside linebacker spot before the 2005 season.

In 2006, Adibi finished second on the team in tackles with 82. Following a 17-0 shutout of Virginia, he was honored as the ACC defensive lineman of the week for his performance, which included a forced fumble to set up the first (and winning) touchdown.

In 2007, Adibi led the Hokies with 115 tackles in 14 games and had two interceptions.

== Professional career ==
Adibi was drafted in the fourth round of the 2008 NFL draft by the Houston Texans. On September 5, 2011, Adibi was claimed off waivers by the Minnesota Vikings.

On August 11, 2012, Adibi signed with the Chicago Bears. He was released on August 31, 2012.

On October 24, 2012, the Tennessee Titans signed Adibi.

== Coaching career ==
=== Virginia Tech ===
In January 2022, Adibi left his post at Texas A&M-Commerce to accept a position on Brent Pry's inaugural Virginia Tech staff as a defensive analyst.

== Personal life ==
Adibi's older brother, Nathaniel Adibi, was a standout defensive end for the Hokies. Their father, Abiodun Adibi, was a college soccer player at Oklahoma State and is a professor at Hampton University.
