= Cedric Humes =

American football player (born 1983)

No. 30, 32
- Position: Running back

Personal information
- Born: August 7, 1983 (age 43); Virginia Beach, Virginia, U.S.
- Listed height: 6 ft 1 in (1.85 m)
- Listed weight: 233 lb (106 kg)

Career information
- College: Virginia Tech
- NFL draft: 2006: 7th round, 240th overall pick

Career history
- Pittsburgh Steelers (2006); New York Giants (2006)*; Amsterdam Admirals (2007)
- * Offseason or practice squad member only

Cedric Akeem Humes (born August 7, 1983) is an American former professional football player who was a running back in the National Football League (NFL). He was selected by the Pittsburgh Steelers in the seventh round of the 2006 NFL draft. He played college football at Virginia Tech.

== Early life ==
Humes is a notable alumnus of Princess Anne High School. Around 2001, Humes committed to Virginia Tech.

== College career ==
Humes attended Virginia Tech. Humes missed the 2004 preseason scrimmages with an injury. Humes was instrumental in their 2005 ACC Coastal Division Title. He was named the MVP of the 2006 Toyota Gator Bowl after helping the Virginia Tech Hokies defeat the Louisville Cardinals 35–24.

== Professional career ==
Pre-draft measurables
Height	Weight	Arm length	Hand span	40-yard dash	10-yard split	20-yard split	20-yard shuttle	Three-cone drill	Vertical jump	Broad jump	Bench press
6 ft 0 7/8 in (1.85 m)	227 lb (103 kg)	31 3/4 in (0.81 m)	9 7/8 in (0.25 m)	4.59 s	1.62 s	2.70 s	4.22 s	6.78 s	32.0 in (0.81 m)	9 ft 3 in (2.82 m)	18 reps
All values from NFL Combine/Pro Day

In 2006, the Steelers placed Humes on the practice squad/injured reserve list, ending his season.

On December 21, 2006, Humes was signed to the New York Giants practice squad, whence he was sent to NFL Europe. During the off season there, Humes broke his neck during the last game of the season and was subsequently released in July 2007.

== Post-football career ==
After his stint in the NFL, Humes moved back to Virginia Beach, VA. He worked at Salem High School where he taught Algebra and worked with students in special education, and then as a high school math teacher at Madison Alternative in Norfolk, Virginia. He now works for Coca-Cola out of Norfolk.
