= Bryan Stinespring =

American football player and coach (born 1963)

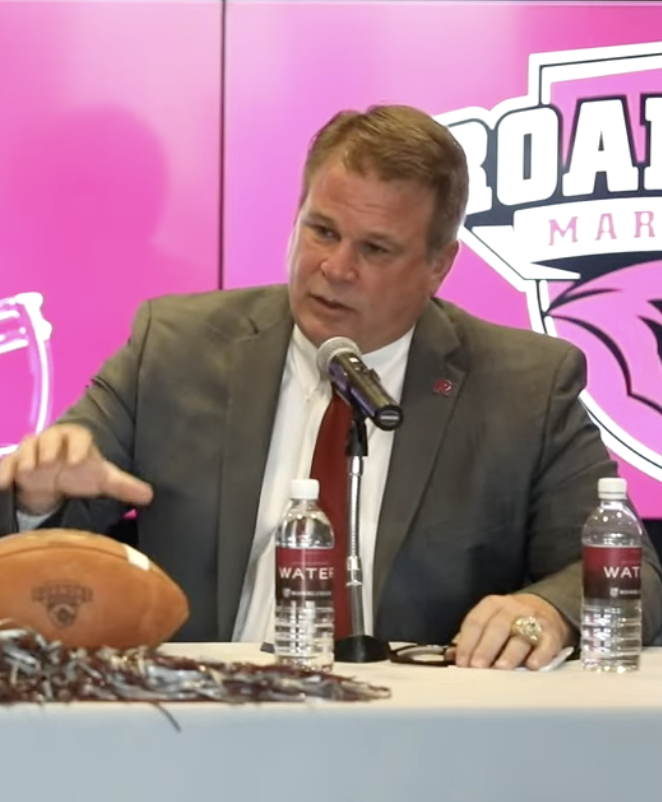

Current position
- Title: Head coach
- Team: Roanoke
- Conference: ODAC
- Record: 5–4

Biographical details
- Born: October 12, 1963 (age 63); Clifton Forge, Virginia, U.S.

Playing career
- 1982–1985: James Madison
- Position: Lineman

Coaching career (HC unless noted)
- 1986–1988: Lexington HS (VA)
- 1989: Patrick Henry HS (VA)
- 1990–1991: Virginia Tech (GA)
- 1993: Virginia Tech (TE/AOL)
- 1994–1997: Virginia Tech (TE/AOL/RC)
- 1998–2000: Virginia Tech (OL/RC)
- 2001: Virginia Tech (AHC/OL/RC)
- 2002–2005: Virginia Tech (OC/OL)
- 2006–2010: Virginia Tech (OC/TE)
- 2011–2012: Virginia Tech (OC/TE/OT)
- 2013–2015: Virginia Tech (RC/TE)
- 2016: James Madison (TE/RGC)
- 2017: James Madison (OL/RGC)
- 2018: Maryland (OL)
- 2019: Old Dominion (TE/RCG)
- 2020–2021: Delaware (AHC/OL)
- 2022: Alleghany HS (VA) (AD)
- 2023: VMI (AHC)
- 2023–present: Roanoke

Head coaching record
- Overall: 5–4

Bryan Stinespring (born October 12, 1963) is an American college football coach. He is the head football coach for Roanoke College, a position he has held since 2023. He was the assistant head coach and offensive line coach at the University of Delaware, as well as formerly the run game coordinator and offensive line coach at James Madison University from 2016 to 2017. He was previously the tight ends coach (1993–1997, 2006–2015) and recruiting coordinator for the Virginia Tech Hokies football program. He was a full-time member of head coach Frank Beamer's staff from 1993 to 2015. Throughout his tenure in Blacksburg, Stinespring held a number of other positions including offensive line coach (1993–2005), recruiting coordinator (1994–2001), assistant head coach (2001) and offensive coordinator (2002–2012).

Following Beamer's retirement at the end of the 2015 season, Stinespring joined the staff at his alma mater James Madison where he served as offensive line coach and run-game coordinator. At the end of the 2022 season, Stinespring was named associate head coach and offensive assistant at VMI.

== Head coaching record ==
Year	Team	Overall	Conference	Standing	Bowl/playoffs
Roanoke Maroons (Old Dominion Athletic Conference) (2025–present)
2025	Roanoke	5–4	3–4 (Note: While Roanoke is recognized as 4–4 with their conference record, they were awarded an extra conference victory due to Averett forfeiting a game originally scheduled for November 15, 2025. However, it is not recognized as a victory on Stinespring’s record.)	T–5th	
2026	Roanoke	0–0	0–0		
Roanoke:		5–4	3–4		
Total:		5–4			

== Criticism ==
Stinespring had faced criticism from the fans and a player for offensive output during his time as offensive coordinator, which compared poorly with that of his predecessors under Frank Beamer.

In 2008, sports columnist Norm Wood has commented that Stinespring's offensive production in recent years has been "abysmal", and that he heard fans chanting "Fire Stinespring" before one home game.

While Stinespring faced criticism for offensive production, he has also been praised for his abilities as a recruiter. Players have also expressed their appreciation for Stinespring as a personal coach, and for his ability to recruit talented new players to the school.

== Statistics ==
Below are Virginia Tech's offensive statistics during Stinespring's time as offensive coordinator.

Season	Rushing offense		Passing offense		Total offense		‡ Scoring offense	
	Actual	†Ranking (Conf)	Actual	†Ranking (Conf)	Actual	†Ranking (Conf)	Actual	†Ranking (Conf)
2002	212.43	#19 (#2 BE)	159.21	#99 (#7 BE)	371.64	#64 (#5 BE)	30.64	#30 (#2 BE)
2003	209.31	#17 (#2 BE)	192.46	#82 (#6 BE)	401.77	#38 (#3 BE)	35.38	#12 (#1 BE)
2004	178.23	#32 (#3 ACC)	187.31	#80 (#6 ACC)	365.54	#65 (#4 ACC)	30.77	#25 (#2 ACC)
2005	190.69	#29 (#2 ACC)	190.23	#91 (#9 ACC)	380.92	#57 (#4 ACC)	33.85	#17 (#1 ACC)
2006	113.38	#90 (#7 ACC)	181.77	#82 (#8 ACC)	295.15	#99 (#9 ACC)	25.85	#49 (#4 ACC)
2007	133.64	#82 (#7 ACC)	196.86	#85 (#9 ACC)	330.50	#100 (#8 ACC)	28.71	#53 (#2 ACC)
2008	174.36	#35 (#3 ACC)	129.07	#111 (#11 ACC)	301.43	#103 (#11 ACC)	22.07	#90 (#8 ACC)
2009	208.15	#14 (#2 ACC)	183.92	#95 (#9 ACC)	392.08	#50 (#6 ACC)	31.85	#24 (#4 ACC)
2010	198.71	#23 (#2 ACC)	203.57	#72 (#8 ACC)	402.29	#41 (#5 ACC)	33.86	#21 (#1 ACC)
2011	186.86	#28 (#2 ACC)	226.14	#66 (#9 ACC)	413.00	#35 (#3 ACC)	27.93	#57 (#6 ACC)
2012	145.85	#79 (#5 ACC)	230.92	#64 (#9 ACC)	376.77	#81 (#9 ACC)	25.08	#81 (#8 ACC)
*All statistics from the NCAA. † National rankings are among the teams in the football bowl subdivision (formerly called Division I-A), which currently consists of 119 teams. The Big East Conference has 8 teams. The ACC had 11 teams in 2004 and has had 12 teams in all subsequent years. ‡ Scoring offense also includes points scored by defense and special teams.
