= Jonathan Lewis (American football) =

American football player (born 1984)

No. 95, 99
- Position: Defensive tackle

Personal information
- Born: July 12, 1984 (age 42); Richmond, Virginia, U.S.
- Listed height: 6 ft 0 in (1.83 m)
- Listed weight: 305 lb (138 kg)

Career information
- High school: Varina (Henrico, Virginia)
- College: Virginia Tech
- NFL draft: 2006: 6th round, 177th overall pick

Career history
- Arizona Cardinals (2006); Oakland Raiders (2007)*; Seattle Seahawks (2008)*; Detroit Lions (2008)*; Jacksonville Jaguars (2008–2009); Cleveland Browns (2009–2010)*; Seattle Seahawks (2010)*; Virginia Destroyers (2011)
- * Offseason or practice squad member only

Awards and highlights
- UFL champion (2011); Second-team All-ACC (2005)

Career NFL statistics
- Total tackles: 4
- Stats at Pro Football Reference

Jonathan M. Lewis (born July 12, 1984) is an American former professional football player who was a defensive tackle in the National Football League (NFL). He was selected by the Arizona Cardinals in the sixth round of the 2006 NFL draft. He played college football for the Virginia Tech Hokies.

Lewis was also a member of the Oakland Raiders, Seattle Seahawks, Detroit Lions, Jacksonville Jaguars, Cleveland Browns and Virginia Destroyers.

Pre-draft measurables
Height	Weight	Arm length	Hand span	40-yard dash	10-yard split	20-yard split	20-yard shuttle	Three-cone drill	Vertical jump	Broad jump	Bench press
6 ft 1 1/8 in (1.86 m)	309 lb (140 kg)	32 3/8 in (0.82 m)	9 3/4 in (0.25 m)	5.02 s	1.70 s	2.90 s	4.40 s	7.40 s	33.5 in (0.85 m)	9 ft 3 in (2.82 m)	24 reps
All values from NFL Combine
