= Hucles =

Hucles is a surname. Notable people with the surname include:

- Angela Hucles (born 1978), American soccer player and sports executive
- Henry B. Hucles (1897–1979), American sports coach and college athletics administrator
- Henry B. Hucles III (1923–1989), American bishop
