= Joe Flacco =

American football player (born 1985)

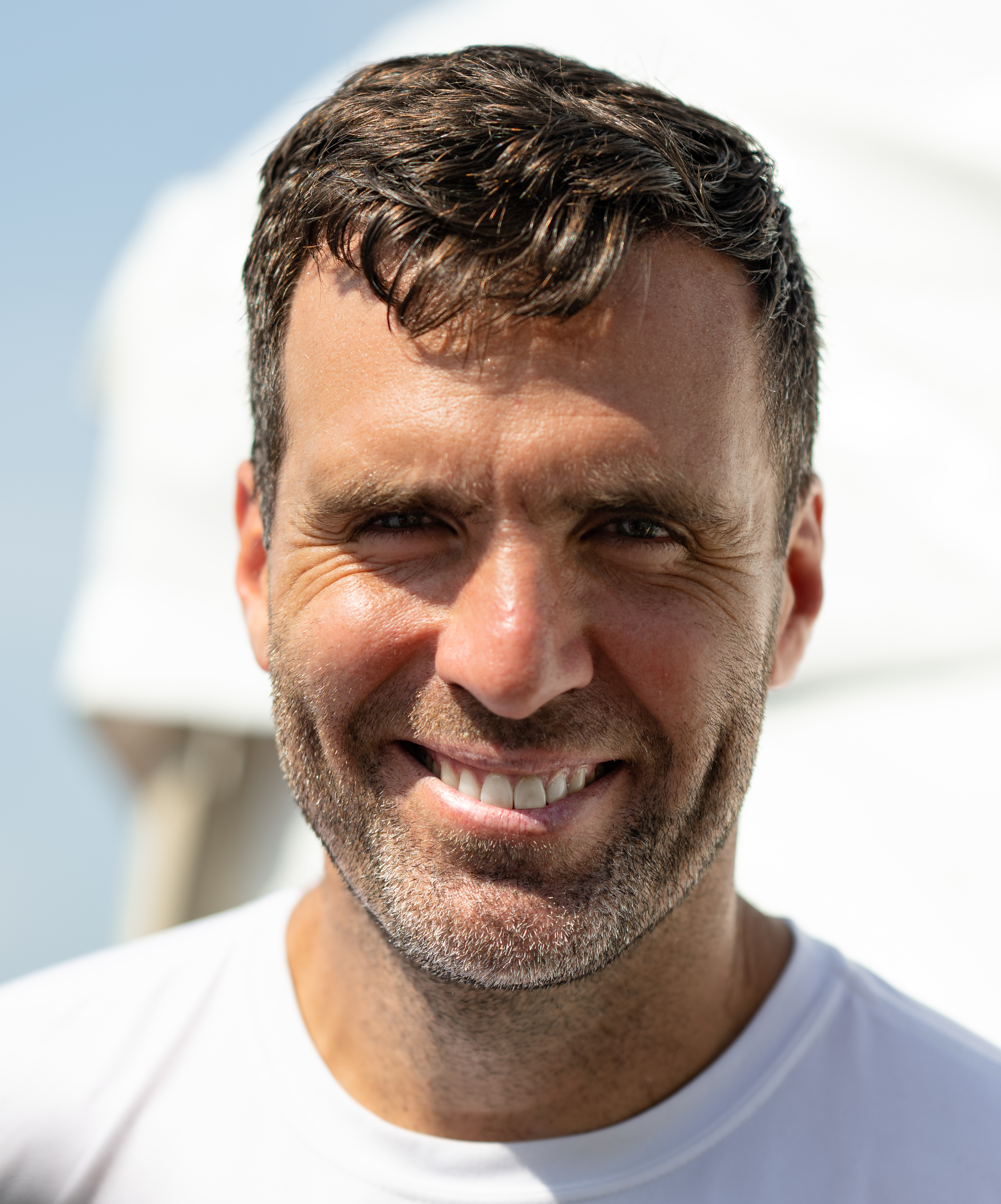
- Flacco with the Cleveland Browns in 2025

No. 16 – Cincinnati Bengals
- Position: Quarterback
- Roster status: Active

Personal information
- Born: January 16, 1985 (age 41); Voorhees Township, New Jersey, U.S.
- Listed height: 6 ft 6 in (1.98 m)
- Listed weight: 245 lb (111 kg)

Career information
- High school: Audubon (Audubon, New Jersey)
- College: Pittsburgh (2003–2004); Delaware (2005–2007)
- NFL draft: 2008: 1st round, 18th overall pick

Career history
- Baltimore Ravens (2008–2018); Denver Broncos (2019); New York Jets (2020); Philadelphia Eagles (2021); New York Jets (2021–2022); Cleveland Browns (2023); Indianapolis Colts (2024); Cleveland Browns (2025); Cincinnati Bengals (2025–present)

Awards and highlights
- Super Bowl champion (XLVII); Super Bowl MVP (XLVII); NFL Comeback Player of the Year (2023); Pepsi NFL Rookie of the Year (2008); Pro Bowl (2025); ECAC Player of the Year (2007); First-team All-CAA (2007); CAA Co-Offensive Player of the Year (2007); Third-team All-American (2007); NFL records: Passing touchdowns in a single postseason: 11 (2012) (tied with Patrick Mahomes); Most touchdowns without an interception in a postseason: 11 (tied with Joe Montana)

Career NFL statistics as of 2025
- Passing attempts: 7,167
- Passing completions: 4,417
- Completion percentage: 61.6%
- TD–INT: 272–172
- Passing yards: 48,176
- Passer rating: 84.1
- Rushing yards: 925
- Rushing touchdowns: 17
- Stats at Pro Football Reference

Joseph Vincent Flacco (born January 16, 1985) is an American professional football quarterback for the Cincinnati Bengals in the National Football League (NFL). He played college football for the Pittsburgh Panthers and the Delaware Fightin' Blue Hens before being selected by the Baltimore Ravens in the first round of the 2008 NFL draft.

As the Ravens' primary starter from 2008 to 2018, Flacco led the Ravens to six postseason appearances, two AFC North division titles, three AFC Championship Games, and a Super Bowl XLVII victory. Flacco was named Super Bowl MVP, concluding a postseason run in which he tied Joe Montana's single postseason record for touchdown passes (11) without an interception. That offseason, Flacco signed a six-year contract worth $120.6 million, a record high for a quarterback at the time. However, he lost his starting position in 2018 to rookie backup Lamar Jackson due to a hip injury and was subsequently traded to the Denver Broncos after the season.

Flacco only played in eight games for the Broncos before a neck injury cut his season short. After being waived with a failed physical designation after the 2019 season, Flacco joined the New York Jets as a backup to Sam Darnold. He then signed with the Philadelphia Eagles in 2021, but was traded back to the Jets after they lost Zach Wilson to injury. Flacco joined the Cleveland Browns midway through the 2023 season following a season-ending injury to Deshaun Watson. He led Cleveland to a playoff berth and won the Comeback Player of the Year award. Flacco later signed a one-year deal with the Indianapolis Colts before returning to the Browns in 2025. A few weeks into the 2025 season, he was traded to the Bengals after they lost Joe Burrow to injury, and he was selected to his first-ever Pro Bowl at the end of that season (he was previously invited to the 2015 Pro Bowl following the 2014 season, but declined). At the height of his career, Flacco was also known for having one of the strongest arms in the NFL.

== Early life ==
Flacco was born on January 16, 1985, in Voorhees Township, New Jersey, and raised in nearby Audubon, New Jersey, the eldest of six children to Karen (née Madden) and Steve Flacco. The Flacco family is originally from Haddon Township, New Jersey. Flacco played football, baseball, and basketball at Audubon High School and was the starting quarterback for the Green Wave. Regarded as a three-star recruit by Rivals.com, he was listed as No. 39 among quarterback prospects in the class of 2003.

== College career ==
=== Pittsburgh ===
Flacco was redshirted as a freshman for the Pittsburgh Panthers football team that went 8–5 in 2003.

In 2004, Flacco was the backup quarterback behind starter Tyler Palko, who led the team to an 8–4 record. He saw action in three games against the Ohio Bobcats, Nebraska Cornhuskers, and South Florida Bulls football. Flacco threw four passes and finished the season with one completion for 11 yards and a 25-yard punt.

=== Delaware ===
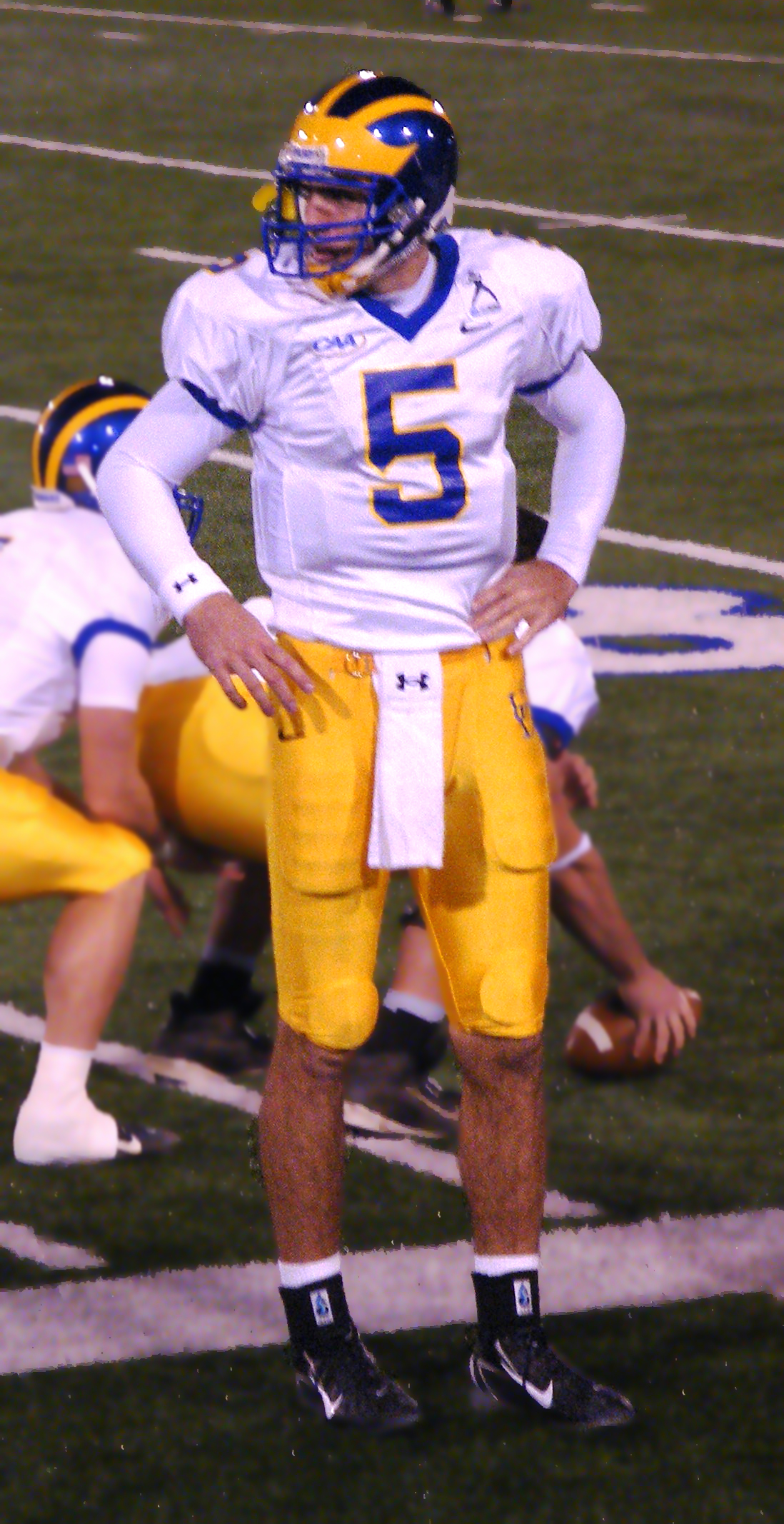
Flacco playing for Delaware in the 2007 FCS championship game

Flacco, still listed behind Palko on the depth chart, decided to transfer to the University of Delaware in 2005. Not only was he ineligible to play that season, he also had to pay to go to Delaware as Pittsburgh would not release him from his scholarship. He saw his first full-time action during the 2006 season, throwing for 2,783 yards, 18 touchdowns, and 10 interceptions. The Fightin' Blue Hens ultimately struggled to a 5–6 record and failed to qualify for the FCS playoffs.

In the 2007 season, Flacco led his team to an 8–3 regular-season record while compiling 4,263 yards, 23 touchdowns, and five interceptions.Arguably his best game came against Navy, where Flacco threw for 434 yards and four touchdowns. He showed another solid performance in the first-ever meeting against the Delaware State Hornets in the first round of the playoffs. Behind Omar Cuff's record-setting day, Flacco threw efficiently for 189 yards and a touchdown, leading the Blue Hens to a 44–7 victory. Flacco continued Delaware's playoff run by upsetting the Northern Iowa Panthers 39–27 in the FCS quarterfinals and upsetting the Southern Illinois Salukis 20–17 the following week in the semifinals. Flacco threw two touchdowns to win against both the Panthers and Salukis, but went on to lose in the FCS National Championship Game to the Appalachian State Mountaineers 49–21.

Flacco set 20 school records during his career at Delaware.

== Professional career ==
=== Pre-draft ===
Pre-draft measurables
Height	Weight	Arm length	Hand span	40-yard dash	10-yard split	20-yard split	20-yard shuttle	Three-cone drill	Vertical jump	Broad jump	Wonderlic
6 ft 6 3/8 in (1.99 m)	236 lb (107 kg)	33 1/8 in (0.84 m)	9 5/8 in (0.24 m)	4.86 s	1.71 s	2.79 s	4.27 s	6.82 s	28.5 in (0.72 m)	9 ft 2 in (2.79 m)	27
All values from the NFL Combine

At Delaware, Flacco was pessimistic about his chances to play in the NFL, and after his junior year asked his coach for permission to play baseball. The coach predicted that he would be selected in the NFL draft, surprising Flacco. With a solid showing at the Senior Bowl and NFL Combine, Flacco solidified himself as a top five quarterback in the 2008 NFL draft. Flacco won the long distance throw competition in ESPN's State Farm College Football All-Star Challenge with a 74-yard throw, beating out Matt Ryan, Colt Brennan, Chad Henne, and John David Booty, later winning the Taco Bell Quarterback Scramble with a time of 15.72 seconds.

Members of the Baltimore Ravens' front office, having attended Flacco's workout at the Senior Bowl, were impressed by his ability to throw in rainy and windy conditions. Flacco again impressed the Ravens' personnel in the poor weather conditions of his workout at Delaware, despite their low expectations given Delaware's small-school pedigree—Flacco performed the workout on an uncut, unlined field with his own footballs. Ravens assistant general manager Eric DeCosta later stated the workouts left him confident Flacco could succeed in the late-season conditions in Pittsburgh, Cleveland, and Cincinnati.

=== Baltimore Ravens ===
==== 2008 ====
Flacco was selected by the Ravens in the first round as the 18th overall pick in the 2008 NFL draft after the team traded out of the eighth overall selection to the 26th, then up again. The selection made Flacco the highest drafted player ever from the University of Delaware. He was also the first Division I-FCS (formerly I-AA) quarterback selected in the first round of the draft since Steve McNair went third overall to the Houston Oilers in the 1995 NFL draft. Draft commentators initially criticized the pick as a "reach", feeling Flacco would likely have still been available in the middle of the second round. DeCosta, however, stated waiting was too much of a gamble and that choosing Flacco in the first round was "an easy decision to make." On July 16, 2008, he signed a five-year contract with a maximum value of around $30 million, and $8.75 million guaranteed.

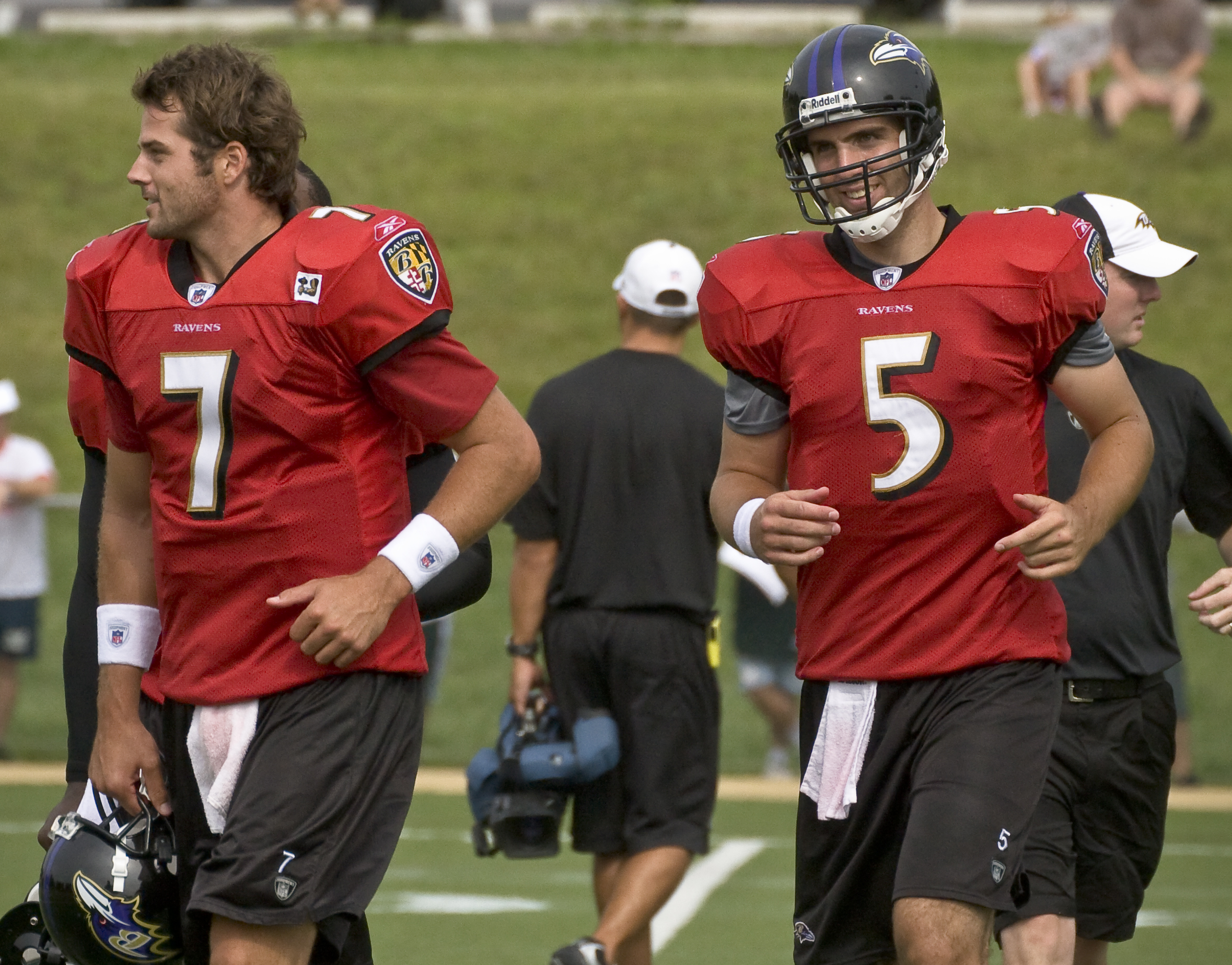
Flacco (right) and Kyle Boller during 2008 training camp

Due to a season-ending injury to incumbent starter Kyle Boller and an illness to former Heisman Trophy winner Troy Smith, Flacco became the starting quarterback in the 2008 season opener against the Cincinnati Bengals. He completed 15 of 29 passes for 129 yards, his longest pass being a 15-yard play to Derrick Mason. He threw no touchdowns and no interceptions in his debut, but he had a 38-yard rushing touchdown, which was the longest rushing touchdown by a quarterback in Ravens' franchise history at the time (the record has since been broken several times by Lamar Jackson). Flacco's touchdown put the Ravens up by 17–3; the team eventually won the game 17–10.

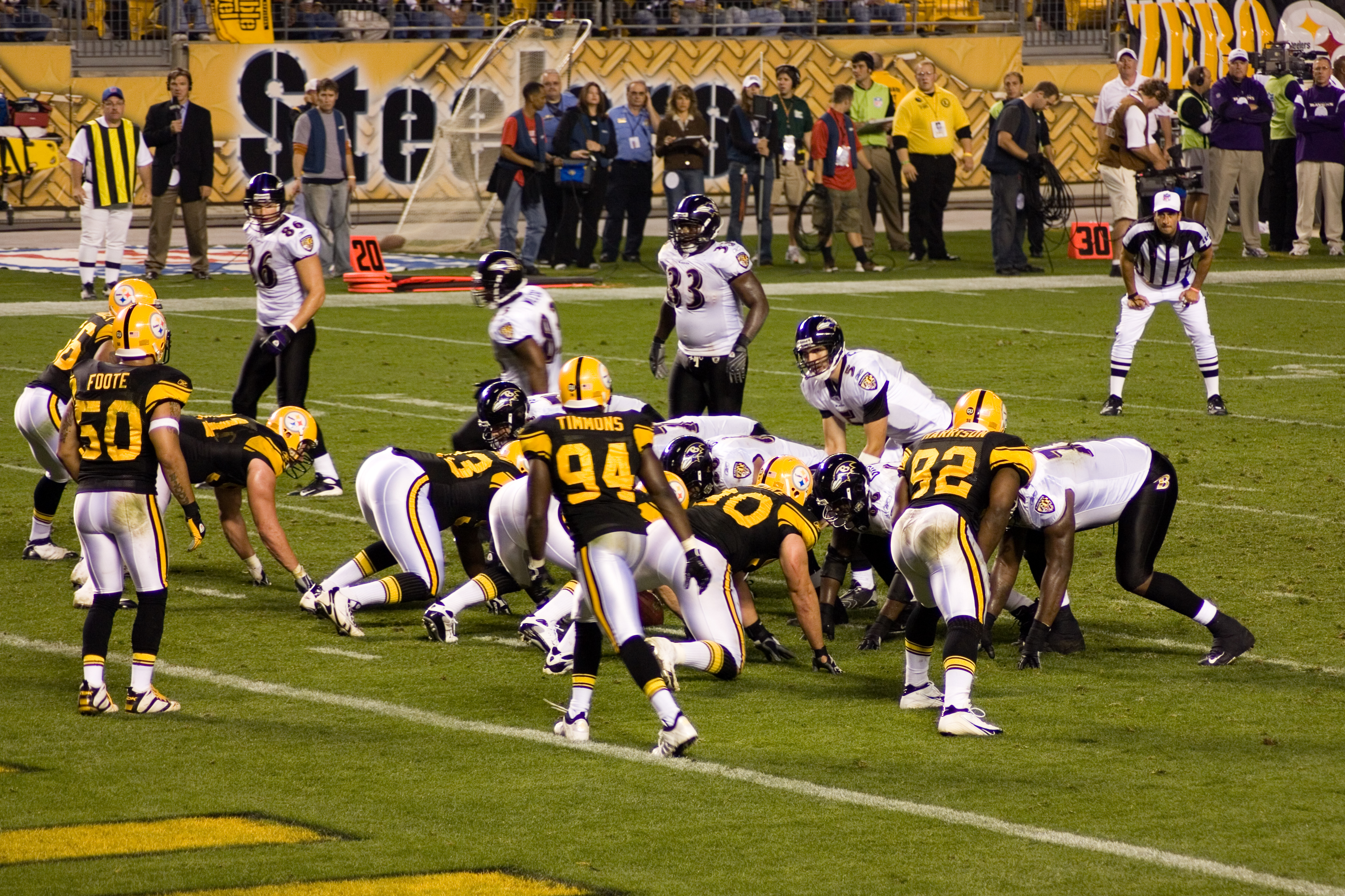
Flacco (crouching) lines up against the Pittsburgh Steelers in 2008.

In his first season, Flacco was named AFC Offensive Player of the Week in Week 9, NFL Rookie of the week, the NFLPA Rookie of the week, and NFL Rookie of the Month for November. Flacco finished his rookie season with 2,971 passing yards, 16 total touchdowns (14 passing, 2 rushing), and 14 turnovers (12 interceptions and 2 lost fumbles).

During the wild card round of the 2008–09 NFL playoffs, Flacco became only the third rookie quarterback in NFL history to win his first post-season start, and the first to do it on the road, when the Ravens defeated the Miami Dolphins, 27–9. Flacco completed 9-of-23 attempted passes, accumulating 135 yards without throwing a touchdown or interception. He also scored the victory-sealing rushing touchdown on a quarterback draw in the 4th quarter. Shaun King, Ben Roethlisberger, Russell Wilson, Mark Sanchez, Brock Purdy, C. J. Stroud, and most recently Jayden Daniels are the only other rookie quarterbacks to ever win their debut playoff game.

He then won his second game against the Tennessee Titans. Flacco led the Ravens to a 13–10 win in the divisional playoff round. Flacco made tight-window throws to Todd Heap and Mark Clayton on the go ahead scoring drive in the fourth quarter to set up a game-winning field goal from Matt Stover. On the day, Flacco was 11-of-22 for 148 yards and a touchdown, without turning the ball over for the second straight game. He became the first rookie quarterback to win two playoff games.

During the AFC Championship Game versus the Steelers, the Ravens lost 23–14, with Flacco throwing for 141 yards, being sacked thrice and throwing three interceptions, one being the game clincher to Troy Polamalu, who returned the pass for a touchdown.

Flacco was named the Diet Pepsi NFL Rookie of the Year in January 2009.

==== 2009 ====
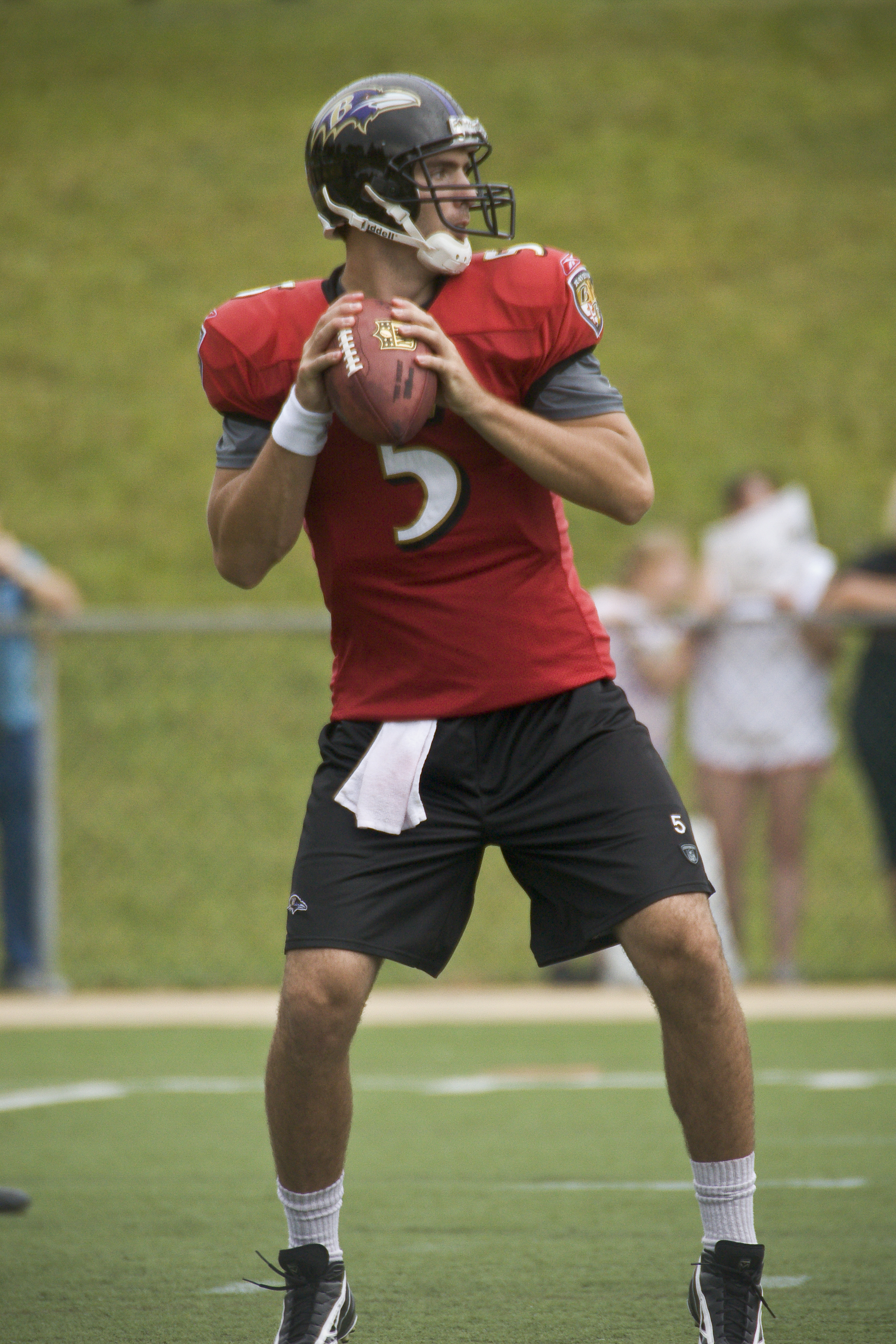
Flacco at Ravens training camp in 2008

In the season opening game in Baltimore against the Kansas City Chiefs, Flacco led the Ravens to a win. He threw for 307 yards and three touchdowns, both career highs, along with 18 yards rushing. He also threw one interception and had a quarterback rating of 95.8. During this game, the Ravens broke the franchise record for most offensive yards in a game with a total of 501.

In Week 15 against the Chicago Bears, Flacco broke his personal record for most touchdowns thrown in a game with four, while throwing for 234 passing yards and completing 72 percent of his passes, earning Flacco a career-high passer rating of 135.6. The Ravens would go on to win the game 31–7. With 3,613 yards and 21 touchdowns, Flacco became the first Ravens quarterback since Vinny Testaverde to throw for more than 3,000 yards and 20 touchdowns in a single season. He also tied his interception number from his rookie season of 12.

An injury limited Flacco's performance on Wild Card Weekend against the New England Patriots. The Ravens routed the Patriots 33–14 despite Flacco throwing 4-of-10 for just 34 yards and one interception.

==== 2010 ====
In the season opener, Flacco and the Ravens opened New Meadowlands Stadium against the New York Jets. Flacco threw for 248 yards while completing 52.6% of his passes, throwing an interception and losing a fumble. In a defensive contest, the Ravens came away with the 10–9 win over their former defensive coordinator Rex Ryan.

During a Week 2 10–15 loss against the Bengals, Flacco had arguably his worst NFL start of his young career, throwing for 154 yards while completing just 43.6% of his passes and throwing a career-high four interceptions, while throwing one touchdown and accumulating a passer rating of 23.8. Coming off of the worst start of his career, Flacco and the Ravens had their home opener against the Cleveland Browns. Flacco bounced back from his Week 2 loss to the Bengals and had his best game of the young season, throwing for 262 yards and completing 71% of his passes. He then connected with prized offseason acquisition wide receiver Anquan Boldin for three touchdowns while throwing no interceptions and accumulating a passer rating of 128.7. The Ravens won the game 24–17.

On December 26, 2010, with a win against the Cleveland Browns, Flacco became one of only four NFL quarterbacks to lead his team to the playoffs in all three of his first three seasons. During this game, Flacco reached 10,000 career passing yards. Ending the season, Flacco set season highs in passing yards (3,622), passing touchdowns (25), passer rating (93.6), and a season low in interceptions (10), yet set a career-high with four lost fumbles.

In defeating the Chiefs (30–7) in the Wild Card Round of the 2010–11 NFL playoffs, Flacco completed 25 of 34 passes for 265 yards, two touchdowns, and no interceptions, for a post-season-high passer rating of 115.4. With the win, Flacco became the first quarterback in NFL history to start and win a playoff game in each of his first three seasons, and tied Len Dawson, Roger Staubach, Jake Delhomme, and Mark Sanchez for most career post-season road wins by a quarterback.

In the Divisional Round, Flacco and the Ravens would once again head to Pittsburgh to play their arch-rival Steelers. The difference this time would be the season was on the line. The Ravens got out to an early 21–7 lead after a 12-yard rush by running back Ray Rice, a fumble recovery run back for a touchdown by defensive end Cory Redding, and a four-yard touchdown pass from Flacco to tight end Todd Heap. But in the third quarter, in which the Ravens had been dominant all through the regular season, Baltimore fell apart. The Ravens turned the ball over three times in their own territory with an uncharacteristic fumble by Rice, an interception by Flacco, and a fumbled snap by center Matt Birk (Flacco was credited with the lost fumble), and with those the Steelers took a 31–24 lead. But even after all of the Ravens miscues and errors, the Ravens still had a shot to tie it at the end when Flacco threw a dart to T.J. Houshmandzadeh on 4th and 18, but it was dropped. Flacco finished the game 16-of-30 for 125 yards, one touchdown, and one interception. He was ranked 90th by his fellow players on the NFL Top 100 Players of 2011.

==== 2011 ====
Flacco had his best game of the season in Week 3 against the St. Louis Rams. He went 27-of-48 with a season-high 389 yards through the air and three touchdowns, all in the first quarter and to rookie wideout Torrey Smith (who actually finished the game with a five catch, 152-yard breakout performance). Flacco had a 103.6 rating, as well as 27 yards rushing and a lost fumble. The Ravens scored a season-high 37 points in the 30-point blowout victory, and also gained a franchise record 553 offensive yards.

Flacco had three more 300-yard games during the regular season: against the Houston Texans, Arizona Cardinals, and Steelers. He won all three of these games, sweeping Pittsburgh for the first time in his career, but also lost fumbles in each one. Despite losing to the San Diego Chargers in Week 15, the Ravens clinched the playoffs for the fourth straight year that week. The Ravens clinched their division, along with the number 2 seed in the AFC, in a Week 17 win over the rival Bengals. Flacco threw for 130 yards and a touchdown.

Flacco finished the season starting all 16 games. He had 312 completions on 542 attempts (57.6%). He threw for 3,610 yards, 20 touchdowns, 12 interceptions, and had one rushing score. He averaged 225.6 yards per game, was sacked 31 times over the course of the season and set a new career high with six lost fumbles. He finished the year with an 80.9 QB rating.

Flacco continued his playoff dominance that year. In the Divisional Round against the Houston Texans, he threw for 176 yards and two touchdowns, with no turnovers. In the AFC Championship, Flacco completed 22 out of 36 passes for 306 yards, two touchdowns, and one interception. These stats were enough to outplay Patriots quarterback Tom Brady, who threw for 67 fewer yards, two fewer touchdowns, and one more interception than Flacco. Despite Flacco's performance, the Patriots advanced to the Super Bowl when a potential game-tying field goal attempt by kicker Billy Cundiff was shanked wide left in the final minute of the game.

==== 2012: Super Bowl MVP ====
On the NFL Network's Top 100 Players of 2012 list, Flacco was ranked 74th by his fellow players. Despite Flacco's success (the Ravens were in the playoffs each of his first four seasons), few saw him as among the NFL's best quarterbacks. Before January 2015, he had never been selected for the Pro Bowl. In April 2012, Flacco was, as The New York Times later stated, "almost universally mocked" when he stated that he was the best quarterback in the NFL, superior to Brady, Peyton Manning, or Aaron Rodgers. "I don't think I'd be very successful at my job if I didn't feel that way", Flacco said. In July, he turned down the Ravens' offer of a new contract, reportedly for $16 million a year, telling his agent that he believed he could improve and earn more.

In the opening week, Flacco passed for 299 yards and two touchdowns in a 44–13 victory over the Bengals to earn his second AFC Offensive Player of the Week honor. By Week 11, the Ravens had amassed a 9–2 record. Flacco played poorly, however, once again in a Week 12 rematch with the Steelers, completing only 16 of 34 passes for 188 yards with one touchdown and an interception. The game saw the Ravens squander a ten-point lead and lose 23–20, despite their division rival starting backup Charlie Batch at quarterback. The following week against the Washington Redskins, Flacco went 16-of-21 with three touchdowns but again amassed less than 200 passing yards in the season's first back-to-back losses. With the offense remaining inconsistent and the team missing opportunities to win their division with each loss, offensive coordinator Cam Cameron was unexpectedly fired and replaced by quarterbacks coach – and former Indianapolis Colts head coach – Jim Caldwell. The change at coordinator was followed by a lopsided loss to the Denver Broncos, leading to widespread criticism of Flacco in the media.

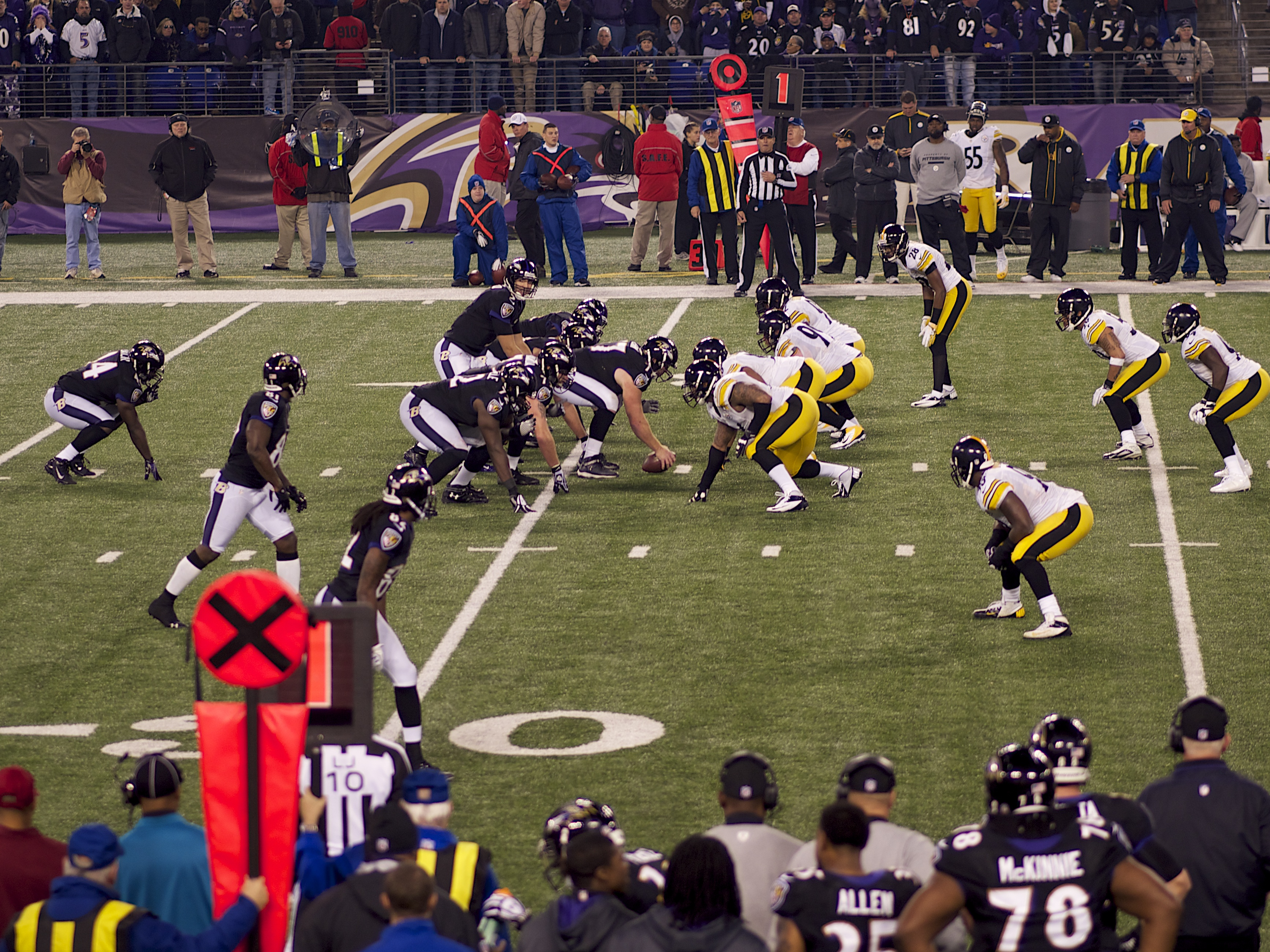
Flacco under center against the Steelers on December 2, 2012

Flacco and the Ravens responded with a decisive 33–14 win over the defending Super Bowl champion New York Giants in which Flacco threw for 309 yards and two touchdowns, with another rushing. Despite the victory over New York, much of the local and national media wrote the team off as Super Bowl contenders, with ESPN writing that the team had "backed into the playoffs with a disastrous December."

On January 6, 2013, in the Wild Card round against the Indianapolis Colts, Flacco finished the game 12 of 23 for 282 yards, two touchdowns, and a career postseason high 125.6 passer rating. The 24–9 win at home set up a Divisional round rematch with the Denver Broncos, who entered the game as nine-point favorites after their regular season win over the Ravens, which included a 98-yard interception touchdown return by Broncos' cornerback Chris Harris that marked the lowest point of Flacco's season. Continuing his postseason success, Flacco played one of the best games in his career, throwing for 331 yards and 3 touchdowns. In the fourth quarter, the Ravens were down 35–28 and had one last chance to tie the game. After an incomplete pass and a 7-yard scramble, on 3rd down and 3, with the clock running and less than 45 seconds remaining in regulation with no timeouts, Flacco heaved a 70-yard touchdown pass to Jacoby Jones, sending the game into overtime. The pass has been called the "Mile High Miracle", and "one of the greatest plays in NFL history" and drew comparisons to the "Hail Mary", "Immaculate Reception", and "The Catch". The Ravens would go on to win the game in double overtime 38–35 after an interception by Corey Graham from Peyton Manning and a 47-yard field goal from rookie kicker Justin Tucker, sending the Ravens to face the New England Patriots in the AFC Championship for a second straight year.

On January 20, 2013, Flacco and the Ravens avenged the previous year's AFC Championship Game loss to the Patriots with a 28–13 win, securing their spot in the 2013 Super Bowl. Flacco threw for 240 yards and three touchdowns, notching his third straight game with a passer rating over 100. With this win, Flacco became the second NFL quarterback to defeat both Peyton Manning (with the Broncos) and Tom Brady in the same postseason since both became starting quarterbacks in 2001 (the first to do so was Mark Sanchez in 2010).

On February 3, 2013, the Ravens faced the San Francisco 49ers in Super Bowl XLVII. Flacco completed 22 of 33 passes for 287 yards and three touchdowns to lead the Ravens to a 34–31 win. Flacco's three touchdowns in the game tied him for first place on the list of most consecutive playoff games with at least three touchdown passes (3 games). With a record fourth playoff game with a 100+ passer rating in a single postseason, Flacco was named the game's Most Valuable Player and was awarded a brand-new 2014 Chevrolet Corvette.

Flacco finished the postseason having completed 73-of-126 (57.9 percent) passes for 1,140 yards with 11 touchdowns and zero interceptions, tying Montana and Kurt Warner for the most touchdowns in a single postseason and additionally tying Montana for the most touchdowns without an interception in a single postseason. Flacco's 117.2 passer rating tied him for third place all-time with Steve Young in a Super Bowl-winning postseason.

These accomplishments gave Flacco what The New York Times stated, "might be the best start to a player's free agency in the history of professional sports", as his contract expired after the season. He was ranked 19th by his fellow players on the NFL Top 100 Players of 2013.

==== 2013 ====
On March 4, 2013, Flacco became the highest-paid quarterback in NFL history when he signed a six-year contract worth $120.6 million. However, within months, he was surpassed by the Green Bay Packers' Aaron Rodgers and the Atlanta Falcons' Matt Ryan.

Flacco's 2013 season was statistically the worst of his career. For the first time as an NFL quarterback, Flacco threw more interceptions than touchdowns. His 22 interceptions in the season were 10 more than he had thrown in any other season. His 19 touchdowns were also his lowest since his rookie year. His passer rating was a career low 73.1, approximately 7 points lower than Flacco's previous worst season passer rating. He was also sacked more times (48) than he was in any other season in his career. Despite all this, he also set a high in passing yards, with 3,912. The Ravens finished 8–8 for the season and Flacco missed the playoffs for the first time in his career. He was ranked 58th by his fellow players on the NFL Top 100 Players of 2014.

==== 2014 ====
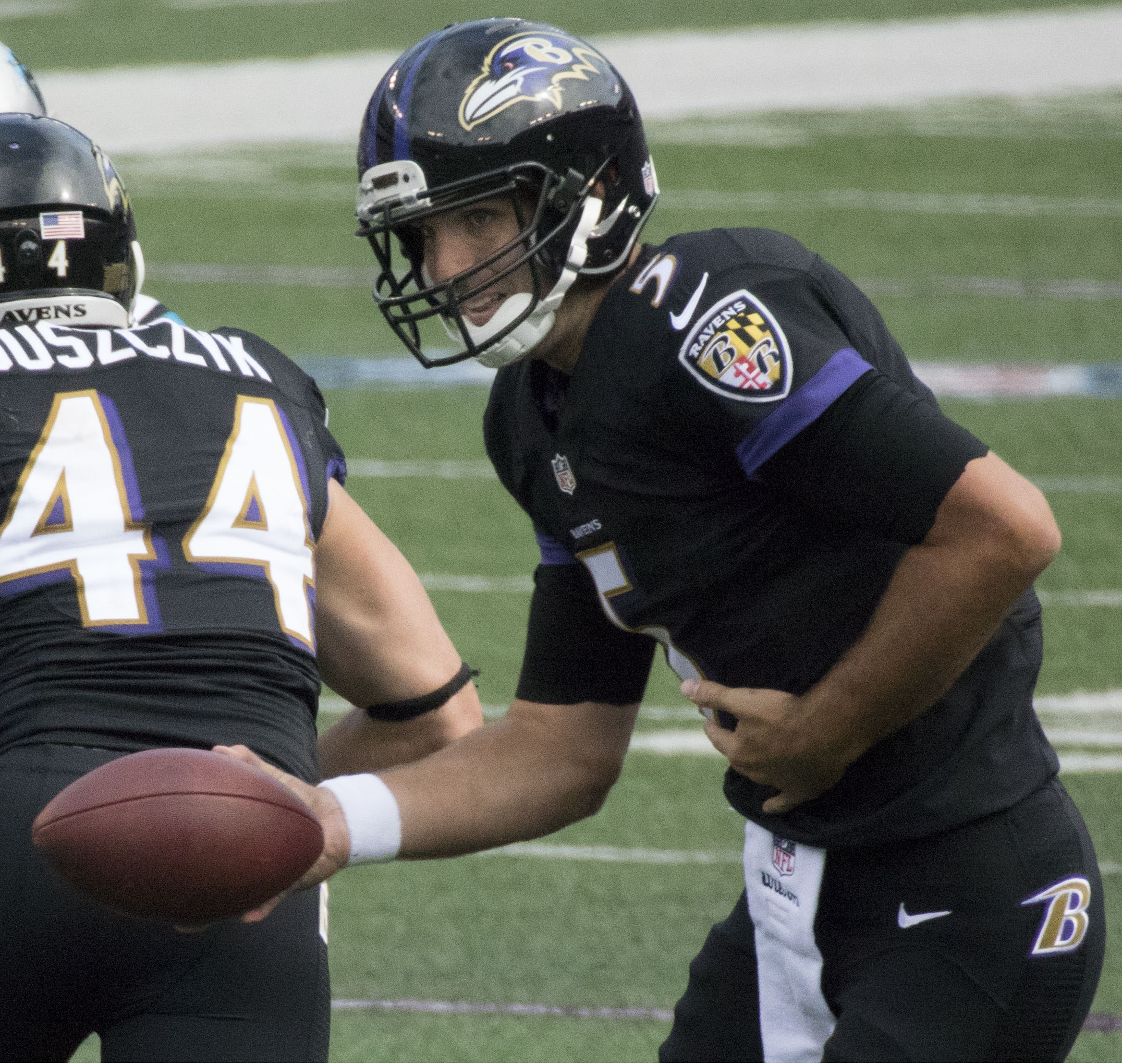
Flacco versus the Carolina Panthers in 2014

In their 2014 season home opener, the Ravens played against the division rival Bengals. The game saw the Ravens trailing practically the entire time; however, their one lead of the game came off of an 80-yard touchdown pass from Flacco to wide receiver Steve Smith Sr. At the time, it was the longest touchdown throw of Flacco's career. However, the Ravens would go on to lose the game 16–23, after Bengals' quarterback Andy Dalton connected with receiver A. J. Green for an even more stupendous 77-yard touchdown that would ultimately be the game winner. It would be the first time since 2005 that the Ravens lost their home opener. Flacco finished the game completing 35 of 62 passes and throwing for a season-high 345 passing yards along with a touchdown and an interception, with a passer rating of 71.0.

Flacco had his best game of the season in Week 6, and one of the best games of his career. He completed 21 of 28 passes for 306 yards and a career-high five touchdown passes to four different receivers (Smith Sr., Torrey Smith, Kamar Aiken, and Michael Campanaro) with no interceptions. He once again wasn't sacked and had a season-high passer rating of 149.7. Flacco became the fastest quarterback to throw five touchdown passes, as it only took him 16 minutes and 3 seconds. The Ravens blew out the Tampa Bay Buccaneers 48–17. He earned AFC Offensive Player of the Week honors for the third time in his career.

In Week 16, the Ravens took on the Texans with a chance to clinch the playoffs. Flacco played his worst game of the season, and arguably the worst of his career. He ended the first half with only 27 passing yards and two interceptions, as the Ravens trailed 0–16 going into halftime. The Ravens would rally in the second half, as Flacco threw two touchdown passes to Torrey Smith, but the Ravens never held a lead in the entire game and ended up losing 13–25. Flacco finished completing 21 of 50 passes for 195 yards, two touchdowns and three interceptions with a season-low passer rating of 41.7. He was also sacked twice.

In Week 17, the Ravens took on the Browns in Baltimore with a chance to clinch the final playoff seed, but they needed a win and for the Kansas City Chiefs to beat or tie the San Diego Chargers. Trailing 6–10 in the fourth quarter, Flacco stepped up big time, heaving a deep pass to Torrey Smith, who caught the ball at the Browns' 16-yard line. On the next play of the game, Flacco connected with Smith again, this time for a touchdown, which put the Ravens up 13–10 for good with 7:33 left in the game. With 3:44 left in the game, Flacco threw another touchdown pass to Kamar Aiken, sealing a 20–10 win. Kansas City would beat San Diego 19–7, giving Baltimore the final AFC playoff spot. Flacco finished the game with 22 of 36 completed passes, 312 passing yards, 2 touchdowns, and no interceptions with a passer rating of 107.6. Flacco was also sacked one time, which caused one of his two fumbles in the game (he did not lose either).

The 2014 season saw Flacco have the best regular season of his career. He set highs in passing yards (3,986), passing touchdowns (27), times sacked (19), fumbles (5), and fumbles lost (0). He also attempted and completed the second most single season passes in his career (344 completions out of 554 attempts) and tied his mark for second fewest interceptions thrown in a regular season (12). From Weeks 2 through 4, Flacco was not sacked at all. In 5 of Flacco's last 6 games of the season, his passer rating was 99 or higher, with the one exception being the 13–25 loss to Houston. He led Baltimore to a 10–6 record.

During the Wild Card Round, the Ravens faced the AFC North-winning Steelers at Heinz Field. Flacco completed 18 of 29 passes for 259 yards, two touchdowns and no interceptions with a passer rating of 114.0, as the Ravens beat the Steelers 30–17. He was sacked once, after getting tripped up by his offensive lineman on the Ravens' first offensive play of the game. This became the first time that the Ravens beat the Steelers in the postseason. Flacco also continued his streak of winning a game in his team's first round of the playoffs. His biggest accomplishment, however, may have been that he became the first quarterback in NFL history to start and win a playoff game in six of their first seven seasons.

In the Divisional Round, the Ravens traveled to Foxborough to take on the #1-seed Patriots, where they lost to the eventual Super Bowl champions in a 35–31 shootout, despite two back-to-back 14-point leads. Flacco still performed well, going 28/45 with 292 passing yards, a career-postseason-high four touchdown passes, and two interceptions for a 92.1 passer rating. Once again, he was not sacked.

For his efforts during the 2014 season, Flacco was invited to the 2015 Pro Bowl as an alternate but turned down the opportunity to play because his wife, Dana, was due to give birth to the couple's third child the same month.

On the NFL Top 100 Players of 2015, Flacco was ranked number 97, the lowest that he has ever been ranked, on the NFL's Top 100 Players list. He fell 39 spots from the previous year, where he was ranked number 58.

==== 2015 ====
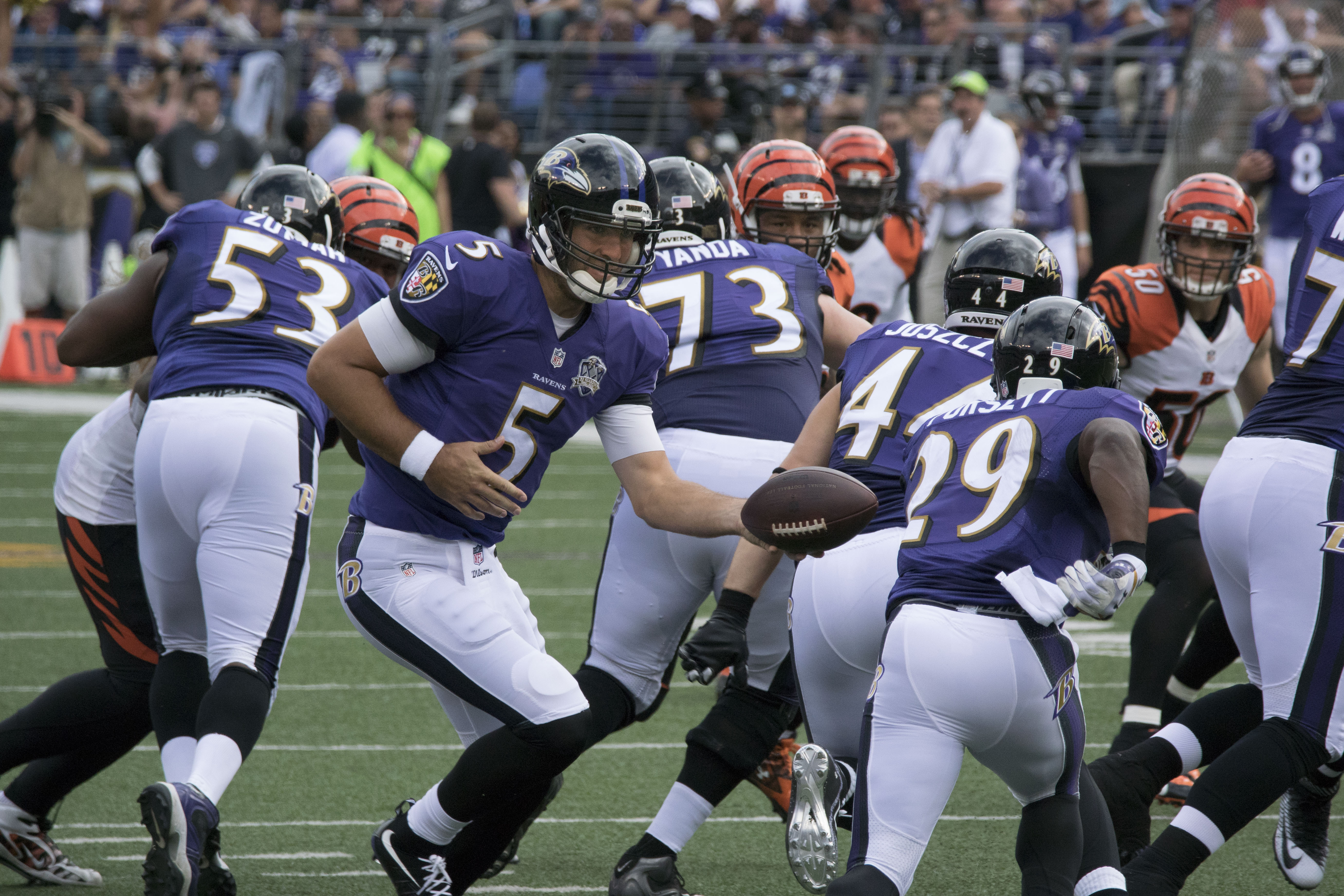
Flacco in 2015

The Ravens began their 2015 season in a road game against the Broncos, the place where Flacco had his breakout playoff performance nearly three years earlier. Leading the game, 13–9, with less than a minute left in the third quarter, Flacco threw a pass down the middle of the field, aiming for Steve Smith Sr., but missed the pass terribly, as it was intercepted by Broncos cornerback Aqib Talib and returned 51 yards for a touchdown. It was Flacco's first pick-six since the 2013 season finale. With less than a minute left in the game, the Ravens had the ball at the Denver 16-yard line and were trailing, 19–13. Flacco threw a pass into the end zone, intended for double-covered tight end Crockett Gillmore, which was intercepted by safety, and former Raven, Darian Stewart, officially ending the game for Baltimore.

In Week 2, against the Oakland Raiders, Flacco bounced back by going 32-of-45 with 384 yards and two touchdown passes to Crockett Gillmore, with a 102.5 passer rating. However, while trying to rally the Ravens back at the end of the game, he was picked off by cornerback Neiko Thorpe with less than 30 seconds left, giving the Raiders a 37–33 upset win. It was the first time in his NFL career that Flacco started a season with a 0–2 record.

On the final drive of the Ravens' Week 11 game versus the Rams, Flacco suffered a torn ACL and MCL, ending his 2015 season. He stayed in the game to complete the drive and put Baltimore into a position to kick the game-winning field goal, giving the Ravens a 16–13 win at home.

The Ravens had a 3–7 record with Flacco at starting quarterback. Flacco finished the season with 266 completed passes out of 413 attempts, 2,791 yards, 14 touchdowns, 12 interceptions, an 83.1 passer rating, three rushing touchdowns and five fumbles, losing two. Flacco's injury ended his streak of consecutive starts at 122 games.

==== 2016 ====
On March 2, 2016, Flacco agreed to a three-year extension to remain with the team. After their Week 3 victory against the Jacksonville Jaguars, Flacco and the Ravens had accrued a 3–0 record, their best record after three games since 2009, but the Ravens would struggle down the stretch, finishing with an 8–8 record and missing the playoffs for the second straight season, the first consecutive playoff misses for the franchise since 2004–2005. Flacco posted a career-high and franchise record 4,317 passing yards, the first time he reached at least 4,000 yards, but only threw 20 touchdowns and 15 interceptions, the second highest of his career. Flacco posted a 6.4 average per attempt, tying his career worst. Flacco also completed a career-high and franchise best 436 completions, and a career-high and franchise best 672 attempts. The 672 pass attempts currently rank fifth most in a single season in league history. The longest touchdown pass of his career came in Week 9 of the 2016 season against the Steelers. In the first quarter of the game, Flacco's short pass to Mike Wallace went for a 95-yard touchdown, and is the longest regular-season pass play in Ravens history.

==== 2017 ====
On July 26, 2017, it was revealed that Flacco was diagnosed with a back injury, ruling him out for 3–6 weeks of training camp. Against the Dolphins in Week 8, Flacco suffered a concussion after a hit from Kiko Alonso. Flacco left the game, and was relieved by Ryan Mallett for the rest. The Ravens nevertheless won 40–0. The Ravens finished the season with a 9–7 record and just missed the playoffs after losing 31–27 to the Bengals in Week 17, allowing the Buffalo Bills to qualify for the postseason. Flacco finished the season starting all 16 games, throwing for 3,141 yards, 18 touchdowns, and 13 interceptions.

==== 2018 ====
On September 9, 2018, Flacco threw for three touchdowns and had a passer rating of 121.7 in the season-opening blowout against the Buffalo Bills 47–3. The next week he recorded 376 yards and two touchdowns along with two interceptions against the Bengals, losing his seventh game in Cincinnati. He fumbled the ball in the fourth quarter, ending the chance for a comeback.

After suffering a hip injury during a Week 9 loss to the Steelers, Flacco was replaced by rookie Lamar Jackson as the Ravens' starting quarterback. Jackson performed well, going 6–1 at the helm, and Flacco served in a backup role for the first time in his NFL career after he was cleared to play. During the Wild Card Round at home against the Los Angeles Chargers, in which the Ravens were trailing 23–3 due to early struggles by Jackson, many fans chanted for Flacco to return to the field and replace Jackson. However, Flacco would not see action in the game, as Jackson's late comeback bid down 23–17 was stopped following a fumble with 28 seconds left in the fourth quarter. Overall, Flacco finished the season with 2,465 passing yards, 12 touchdowns, and six interceptions.

=== Denver Broncos ===
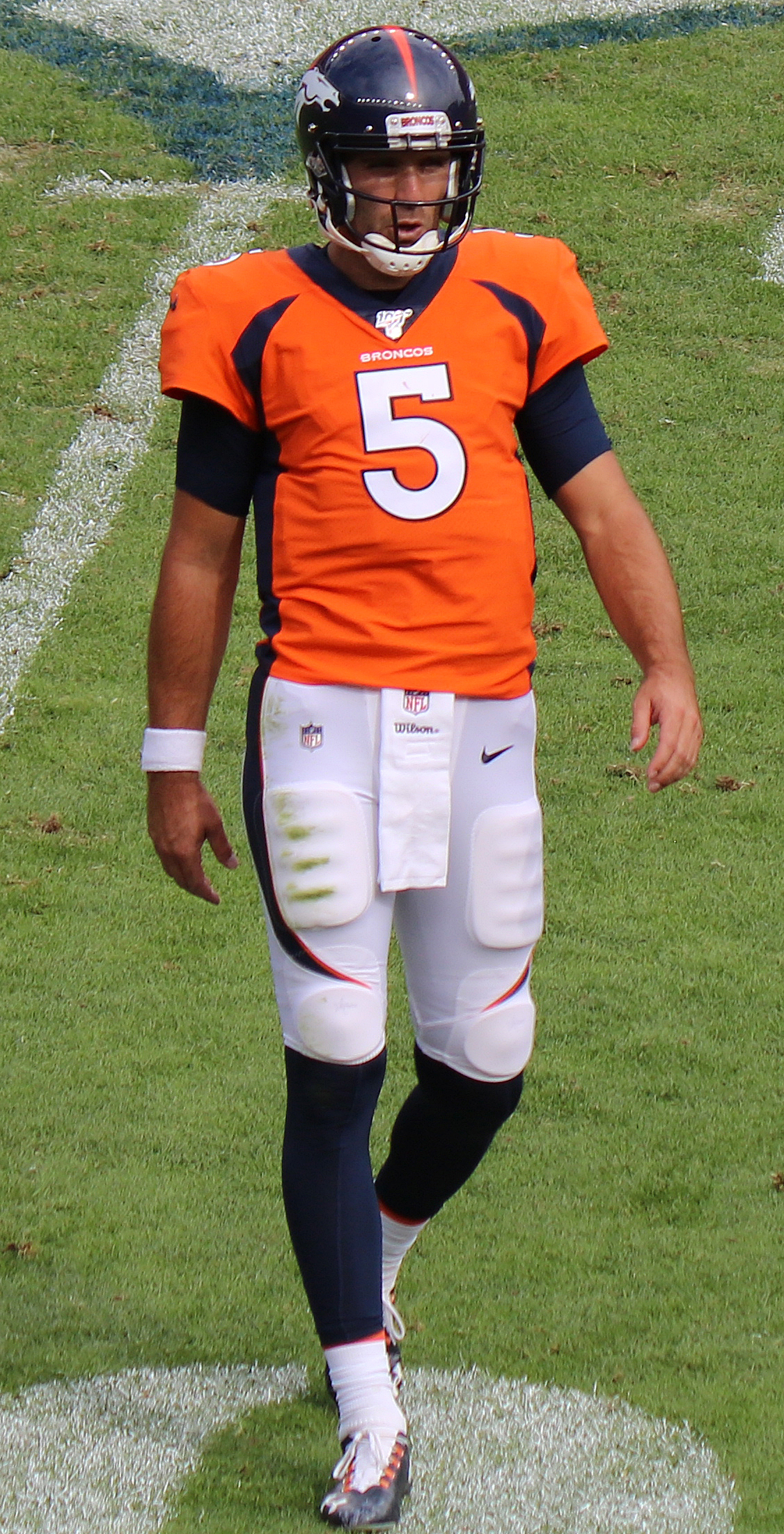
Flacco in 2019

On February 13, 2019, the Ravens agreed to trade Flacco to the Denver Broncos in exchange for their fourth-round pick in the 2019 NFL draft. The deal became official on March 13.

In his Broncos debut, Flacco threw for 268 yards and a touchdown in a 24–16 road loss to the Raiders. Flacco made his debut at Empower Field at Mile High in Week 2 against the Bears. In the game, Flacco threw for 292 yards, one touchdown, and one interception as the Broncos lost 16–14. With 31 seconds left in the game, Flacco threw a seven-yard touchdown pass and a two-point conversion, both to wide receiver Emmanuel Sanders to take a 14–13 lead. However, the Bears quickly drove down the field and Eddy Piñeiro kicked a 53-yard game winning field goal, spoiling Flacco's home debut. In Week 4 against the Jaguars, Flacco threw for 303 yards, three touchdowns, and one interception in the 26–24 loss. In Week 5 against the Chargers, Flacco threw for 182 yards, a touchdown, and an interception as the Broncos won their first game of the season by a score of 20–13. In Week 7 against the Chiefs, Flacco threw for 213 yards and was sacked a career high nine times in a single game. During a Week 8 loss to the Colts, Flacco threw for 174 yards in the 15–13 loss. In the game, he suffered a neck injury which prematurely ended his season. Flacco finished the 2019 season posting 1,822 passing yards, six touchdowns, five interceptions, and an 85.1 passer rating in eight games and starts.

On March 19, 2020, the Broncos released Flacco with a failed physical designation. He underwent neck surgery the following month.

=== New York Jets (first stint) ===
On May 27, 2020, Flacco signed a one-year, $1.5 million deal with the New York Jets as the backup quarterback to 2018 first-round pick Sam Darnold. He was placed on the active/physically unable to perform list at the start of training camp on July 30. Flacco was activated from the list at the start of the regular season on September 5.

Flacco made his Jets debut when he briefly entered the Week 4 matchup after starter Darnold injured his shoulder late in the first quarter. He played only four snaps, going 2 for 2 for 16 yards before Darnold returned in the second quarter in the 37–28 loss to his former team, the Broncos. On October 7, Flacco was named the starter against the Cardinals due to Darnold's shoulder injury. Making his first start with the Jets in Week 5 against the Cardinals, Flacco finished with 195 passing yards and a touchdown as the Jets lost 30–10. In the next game against the Dolphins, Flacco finished with 186 passing yards, an interception, and a fumble that he recovered. The Jets again lost 24–0, the first time Flacco had ever been shut out in his NFL career. In Week 9 against the Patriots, Flacco was again thrust into the starting role after Darnold re-injured his shoulder the previous week. He had his best game of the season, going 18 for 25 for 262 yards and three touchdowns while also passing Joe Montana for 20th on the all-time passing yards list. However, he also threw a costly fourth quarter interception that allowed the Patriots to rally and eventually beat the Jets 30–27. In Week 11 against the Chargers, Flacco completed 15 of 30 passes for 205 passing yards, two touchdowns, and an interception as the Jets lost 34–28 despite an attempted comeback.

=== Philadelphia Eagles ===
On March 25, 2021, Flacco signed a one-year, $3.5 million contract with the Philadelphia Eagles to back up 2020 second-round pick Jalen Hurts. Flacco led all Eagles quarterbacks in completions, pass attempts, passing yards, and passing touchdowns during the pre-season, but did not appear in a regular season game for Philadelphia.

=== New York Jets (second stint) ===
==== 2021 ====
On October 25, 2021, the Eagles traded Flacco back to the Jets for a conditional sixth-round draft pick, after Jets starting quarterback Zach Wilson suffered a knee injury. Flacco served as a backup to Mike White and Josh Johnson for his first three games back with the Jets, coming into the Week 10 game against the Bills in relief of White. He completed all three of his pass attempts for 47 yards and a touchdown. On November 17, 2021, Flacco was named the starting quarterback for the Jets' Week 11 game against the Dolphins. He was placed on the reserve/COVID-19 list by the Jets on November 23 as a close contact with White, who tested positive for COVID-19. Flacco was activated on November 30.

==== 2022 ====
On March 16, 2022, Flacco re-signed with the Jets on a one-year, $3.5 million deal. He was announced as the starter for the first three weeks of the season due to an injury to starter Zach Wilson. Making the start in Week 1 against his former team, the Baltimore Ravens, Flacco completed 37 of 59 passes for 307 yards, a touchdown, and an interception as the Jets lost 24–9. During Week 2 against the Browns, Flacco finished with 307 passing yards and four touchdowns. With 1:22 left of regulation, trailing 30–17, Flacco made a 66-yard touchdown pass to Corey Davis and the Jets successfully executed an onside kick, allowing Flacco to throw another touchdown with 14 seconds left in their 31–30 win. It was his first winning start since the 2019 season. On October 30, before the week 8 game against the Patriots, Flacco was demoted to third string in favor of Mike White. After watching Mike White and Zach Wilson start from Week 4 until Week 17, Flacco was renamed the starter for the season finale after White was ruled out with five broken ribs.

=== Cleveland Browns (first stint) ===
==== 2023: Comeback Player of the Year ====
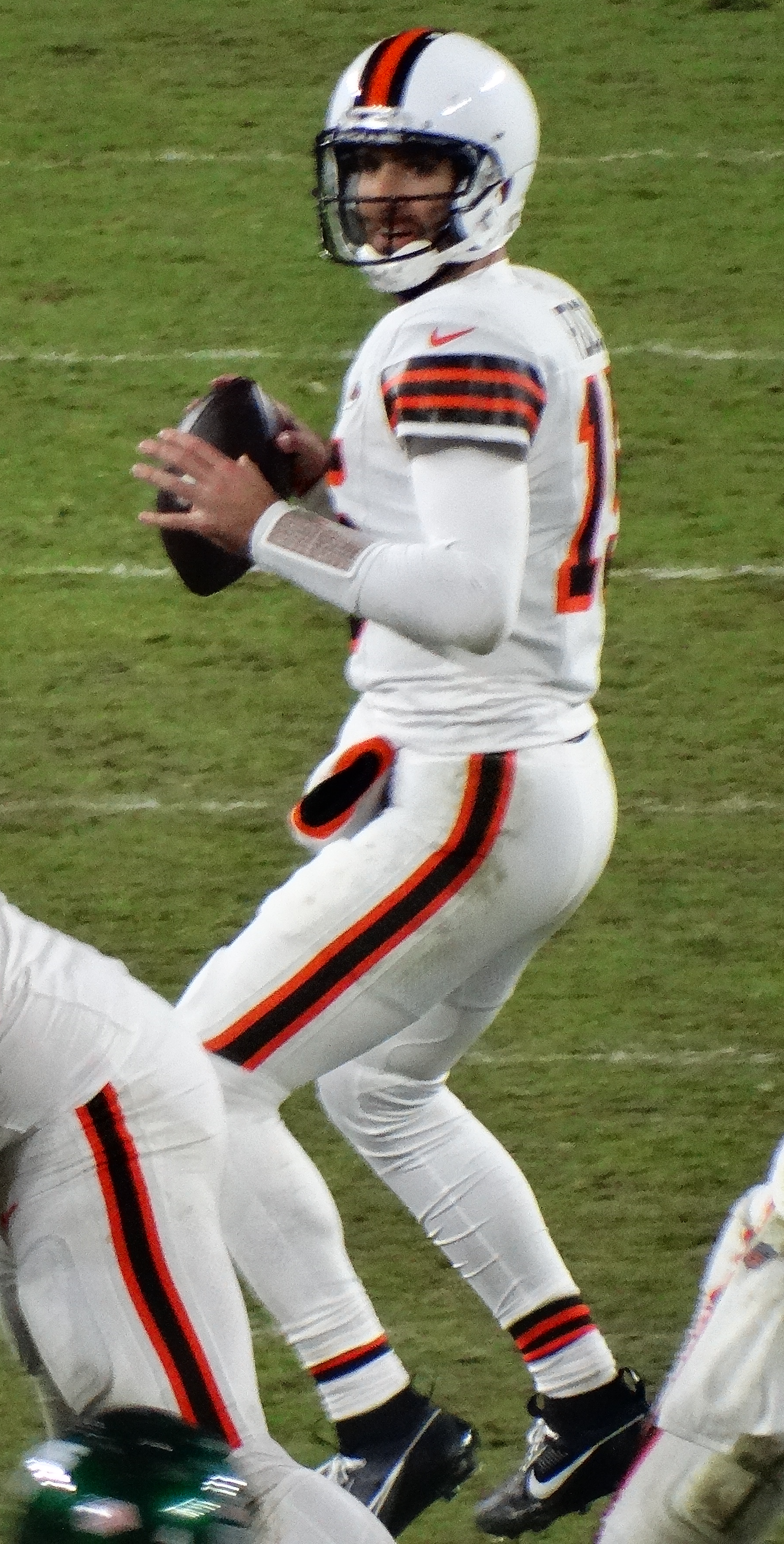
Flacco in 2023

After not finding his way onto a team roster through the beginning of the 2023 season, Flacco was signed to the Cleveland Browns practice squad on November 20, 2023, following a season-ending injury to starting quarterback Deshaun Watson. 13 days after being signed, Flacco was named the starter for Week 13 against the Los Angeles Rams after Dorian Thompson-Robinson was ruled out with a concussion. He was again named the starter against the Jaguars in Week 14. In the game, Flacco completed 26 of 45 passes for 311 yards, three touchdowns and one interception as the Browns won 31–27. Following the win, the Browns announced that Flacco would remain the starter moving forward. After reverting to the practice squad, he officially joined the active roster after signing a one-year deal with Cleveland on December 14.

In Week 16 against the Texans, Flacco completed 27-of-42 passes for 368 yards, three touchdowns, and two interceptions in a 36–22 victory. It was the first time in Flacco's career that he had three consecutive games with over 300 yards passing and he was named the FedEx Air Player of the Week for his performance. In Week 17 against the Jets, Flacco threw three touchdowns and passed for 296 yards in the first half alone, marking the most yards in any half in his career as the Browns won 37–20, clinching their first playoff berth in three years. Flacco became the first player in NFL history to have 250 passing yards and multiple passing touchdowns in each of his first five games with a franchise.

On January 13, 2024, Flacco made his first playoff start since 2015 against the Texans in the Wild Card Round. The nine-year gap between playoff starts is the second-longest gap in NFL postseason history, behind Doug Flutie's 12-year gap from 1987 to 1999. Flacco had a strong first half, completing 15 of 19 passes for 172 yards and a touchdown, but two interceptions returned for touchdowns in the third quarter put the Browns in a deep hole as they lost on the road 45–14. This marked Flacco's first loss in a Wild Card game, having previously gone 5–0. Following the season, Flacco was named NFL Comeback Player of the Year by the Associated Press, becoming the oldest player to win the award since Jim Martin in 1963.

=== Indianapolis Colts ===
On March 22, 2024, Flacco signed with the Indianapolis Colts on a one-year deal. He began the season as the backup to Anthony Richardson but took over in Week 4 against the Steelers after Richardson got injured. Flacco finished the game with 168 yards and two touchdowns, leading the Colts to a 27–24 victory. With Richardson out, Flacco started against the Jacksonville Jaguars in Week 5, completing 33-of-44 passes for 359 yards, three touchdowns and no interceptions in a narrow 37–34 loss. He led the Colts to victory the following week against the Tennessee Titans. With Richardson struggling, the Colts announced on October 30 that Flacco would be the starter moving forward, beginning in their Week 9 matchup against the Minnesota Vikings. After losing both starts and committing six turnovers across those games, Flacco was benched and Richardson was reinstated as the starter prior to Week 11.

After another injury to Richardson between Week 16 and 17, Flacco played the game against the Giants, with a possible playoff bid on the line. However, Flacco would throw two touchdowns and two interceptions as the Giants snapped a 10-game losing streak and beat the Colts 45–33, eliminating the Colts from playoff contention.

=== Cleveland Browns (second stint) ===
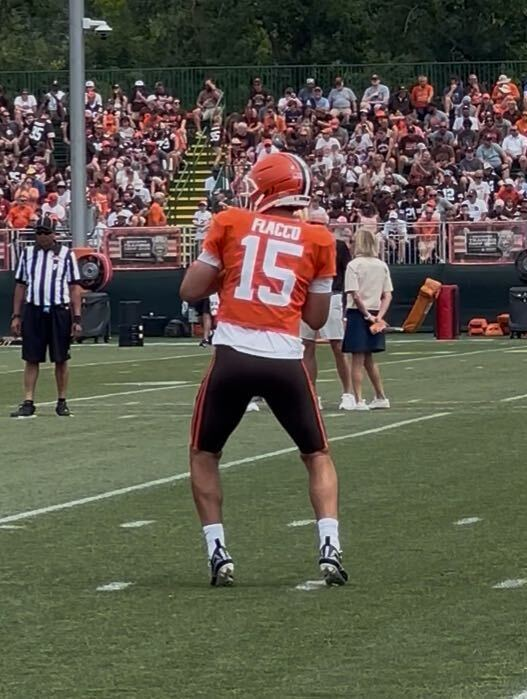
Flacco at Cleveland Browns training camp in August 2025

On April 11, 2025, Flacco agreed to a one-year, $4 million deal to return to the Browns. With Deshaun Watson rehabbing an Achilles injury, Flacco entered training camp in a quarterback competition between Kenny Pickett and rookies Dillon Gabriel and Shedeur Sanders. On August 18, the Browns announced that Flacco would be their starter to open the 2025 season. On October 1, after committing a league-high eight turnovers in the Browns' first four games, Flacco was benched for Gabriel.

=== Cincinnati Bengals ===
==== 2025 season ====
On October 7, 2025, Flacco, along with a sixth-round pick, was traded to the Cincinnati Bengals in exchange for a fifth-round pick. He was immediately inserted into the starting role, replacing Jake Browning after starting quarterback Joe Burrow suffered a turf toe injury early in the season.

Flacco's first start for Cincinnati came versus the Packers on October 12. Having also started against Green Bay a month prior when he was the Browns, Flacco became the seventh quarterback to face the same team twice with two different teams and the first to do it since Jimmy Clausen in 2015. During Week 7 against division rival Pittsburgh Steelers, Flacco completed 31-of-47 passes for 342 yards and three touchdowns, winning his first home game in Cincinnati. Two weeks later against the Chicago Bears, Flacco threw for a career high 470 passing yards, four touchdowns (two to wide receiver Tee Higgins), and two interceptions in the 47–42 loss; it was his first career 400-yard passing game. Due to changes to the roster of the 2026 Pro Bowl Games, Flacco was selected to the Pro Bowl for the first time in his career as an injury replacement for Buffalo Bills quarterback Josh Allen.

==== 2026 season ====
On March 24, 2026, Flacco re-signed with the Bengals on a one-year, $6 million contract.

== Career statistics ==
Legend
	Super Bowl MVP
	Won the Super Bowl
	NFL record
	Led the league
**Bold**	Career high

=== NFL ===
==== Regular season ====
Year	Team	Games			Passing									Rushing					Sacked		Fumbles	
Year	Team	GP	GS	Record	Cmp	Att	Pct	Yds	Y/A	Lng	TD	Int	Rtg	Att	Yds	Y/A	Lng	TD	Sck	SckY	Fum	Lost
2008	BAL	16	16	11–5	257	428	60.0	2,971	6.9	70	14	12	80.3	**52**	**180**	3.5	**38**	2	32	276	**11**	2
2009	BAL	16	16	9–7	315	499	63.1	3,613	7.2	72	21	12	88.9	35	56	1.6	10	0	36	218	8	2
2010	BAL	16	16	**12–4**	306	489	62.6	3,622	7.4	67	25	10	93.6	43	84	2.0	14	1	40	294	9	4
2011	BAL	16	16	**12–4**	312	542	57.6	3,610	6.7	74	20	12	80.9	39	88	2.3	33	1	31	203	**11**	**6**
2012	BAL	16	16	10–6	317	531	59.7	3,817	7.2	61	22	10	87.7	32	22	0.7	16	**3**	35	227	9	4
2013	BAL	16	16	8–8	362	614	59.0	3,912	6.4	74	19	**22**	73.1	27	131	**4.9**	22	1	**48**	**324**	8	2
2014	BAL	16	16	10–6	344	554	62.1	3,986	7.2	80	**27**	12	91.0	39	70	1.8	15	2	19	167	5	0
2015	BAL	10	10	3–7	266	413	64.4	2,791	6.8	50	14	12	83.1	13	23	1.8	16	**3**	16	124	5	2
2016	BAL	16	16	8–8	**436**	**672**	64.9	**4,317**	6.4	**95**	20	15	83.5	21	58	2.8	16	2	33	243	5	3
2017	BAL	16	16	9–7	352	549	64.1	3,141	5.7	66	18	13	80.4	25	54	2.2	25	1	27	205	6	0
2018	BAL	9	9	4–5	232	379	61.2	2,465	6.5	71	12	6	84.2	19	45	2.4	13	0	16	79	3	1
2019	DEN	8	8	2–6	171	262	65.3	1,822	7.0	70	6	5	85.1	12	20	1.7	9	0	26	194	8	3
2020	NYJ	5	4	0–4	74	134	55.2	864	6.4	52	6	3	80.6	6	22	3.7	9	0	7	69	1	0
2021	PHI	0	0	DNP																		
2021	NYJ	2	1	0–1	27	42	64.3	338	**8.0**	62	3	0	**113.0**	2	3	1.5	2	0	2	13	1	1
2022	NYJ	5	4	1–3	110	191	57.6	1,051	5.5	66	5	3	75.2	3	6	2.0	7	0	10	66	5	4
2023	CLE	5	5	4–1	123	204	60.3	1,616	7.9	75	13	8	90.2	9	2	0.2	3	0	8	57	4	1
2024	IND	8	6	2–4	162	248	**65.3**	1,761	7.1	65	12	7	90.5	9	26	2.9	21	0	18	123	4	4
2025	CLE	4	4	1–3	93	160	58.1	815	5.1	35	2	6	60.3	6	13	2.2	8	0	9	54	2	2
2025	CIN	9	6	1–5	158	256	61.7	1,664	6.5	44	13	4	91.0	15	22	1.5	13	1	9	64	1	1
2026	CIN	2	0	—	0	0	—	0	—	—	0	0	—	0	0	—	—	0	0	0	0	0
Career		211	201	107–94	4,417	7,167	61.6	48,176	6.7	95	272	172	84.1	407	925	2.3	38	17	422	3,000	106	42

==== Postseason ====
Year	Team	Games			Passing									Rushing					Sacked		Fumbles	
Year	Team	GP	GS	Record	Cmp	Att	Pct	Yds	Y/A	Lng	TD	Int	Rtg	Att	Yds	Y/A	Lng	TD	Sck	SckY	Fum	Lost
2008	BAL	3	3	2–1	33	75	44.0	437	5.8	48	1	**3**	50.8	**12**	5	0.4	5	**1**	3	16	0	0
2009	BAL	2	2	1–1	24	45	53.3	223	5.0	27	0	**3**	39.4	7	7	1.0	7	0	1	6	0	0
2010	BAL	2	2	1–1	41	64	64.1	390	6.1	28	3	1	90.0	9	25	2.8	13	0	**9**	51	**3**	**2**
2011	BAL	2	2	1–1	36	63	57.1	482	7.7	42	4	1	96.1	6	**26**	**4.3**	**14**	0	8	**60**	1	0
2012	BAL	4	4	**4–0**	**73**	**126**	57.9	**1,140**	**9.0**	**70**	**11**	0	**117.2**	8	16	2.0	**14**	0	6	38	1	1
2014	BAL	2	2	1–1	46	74	62.2	551	7.4	40	6	2	100.7	8	8	1.0	9	0	1	13	1	0
2018	BAL	0	0	DNP																		
2023	CLE	1	1	0–1	34	46	**73.9**	307	6.7	47	1	2	80.6	3	13	**4.3**	8	0	4	39	0	0
Career		16	16	10–6	287	493	58.2	3,530	7.2	70	26	12	87.9	53	100	1.9	14	1	32	223	6	3

=== College ===
Season	Team	Games			Passing								Rushing			
Season	Team	GP	GS	Record	Cmp	Att	Pct	Yds	Y/A	TD	Int	Rtg	Att	Yds	Avg	TD
2003	Pittsburgh	Redshirt														
2004	Pittsburgh	3	0	—	1	4	25.0	11	2.8	0	0	48.1	6	0	0.0	0
2005	Delaware	Redshirt due to NCAA transfer rules														
2006	Delaware	11	11	5–6	264	417	63.3	2,783	6.7	18	**10**	128.8	**83**	**54**	**0.7**	**5**
2007	Delaware	15	15	**11–4**	**331**	**521**	**63.5**	**4,263**	**8.2**	**23**	5	**144.9**	64	22	0.3	4
FBS Totals		3	0	—	1	4	25.0	11	2.8	0	0	48.1	6	0	0.0	0
FCS Totals		26	26	16–10	595	938	63.4	7,046	7.5	41	15	137.8	147	76	0.5	9
Career		29	26	16–10	596	942	63.2	7,057	7.5	41	15	137.4	153	76	0.5	9

== Career highlights ==
=== Awards and honors ===
NFL

- Super Bowl champion (XLVII)
- Super Bowl MVP (XLVII)
- Pro Bowl (2025)
- Pepsi NFL Rookie of the Year (2008)
- NFL Comeback Player of the Year (2023)
- 3× AFC Offensive Player of the Week (Week 9, 2008; Week 1, 2012; Week 6, 2014)
- 2× Pepsi NFL Rookie of the Week (Week 8, 2008; Week 17, 2008)
- 6x FedEx Air Player of the Week (Week 3, 2011; Week 3, 2012; Week 10, 2012; Week 6, 2014; Week 17, 2014; Week 16, 2023)
- 5× NFL Top 100 — #90 (2011), #74 (2012), #19 (2013), #58 (2014), #97 (2015)

College

- ECAC Player of the Year (2007)
- First-team All-CAA (2007)
- CAA Co-Offensive Player of the Year (2007)
- Third-team All-American (2007)

=== Records ===
==== NFL records ====
- Most road playoff wins for a quarterback: 7 (Tom Brady tied record)
- First rookie quarterback to win two playoff games (matched by Mark Sanchez, Brock Purdy, and Jayden Daniels)
- Second-most combined regular and postseason wins in first three years as a quarterback: 36 (tied with Dan Marino)
- First quarterback to start and win a playoff game in each of his first five seasons (Russell Wilson tied record)
- Most touchdowns in a postseason: 11 (tied with Joe Montana, Kurt Warner, and Patrick Mahomes)
- Most touchdowns without an interception in a postseason: 11 (tied with Joe Montana)
- First quarterback to have a passer rating over 100 in all four games of a single postseason
- Most consecutive road playoff games with at least two passing touchdowns: 5
- Fastest quarterback to record five touchdowns in a game: 16:03
- First quarterback to record at least 250 passing yards and two touchdown passes in each of his first five games with a team

==== Ravens franchise records ====
- Most career passing yards – 38,245
- Most career pass completions – 3,599
- Most career pass attempts – 5,670
- Most career passing touchdowns – 212
- Most regular-season wins – 98
- Most postseason wins – 10
- Most consecutive pass completions: 21 vs. Jacksonville Jaguars on September 25, 2016
- Most 300+ passing-yard games, career – 32
- Most 300+ passing-yard games, season – 6 (2012)
- Most 300+ passing-yard games, playoffs – 2
- Most times sacked in a career for a starting quarterback– 290
- Most career fourth-quarter comeback wins – 14
- Most career game-winning drives – 21
- Most game-winning drives in a single season – 4 (2010) (tied with Elvis Grbac)
- Most passing yards in a single season – 4,317 (2016)
- Most pass completions in a single season – 436 (2016)
- Most pass attempts in a single season – 672 (2016)

==== Browns franchise records ====
- Most passing yards in first three starts – 939 (2023)
- Most passing yards in the fourth quarter – 212 (2023)
- Oldest quarterback to attempt a pass in the regular season – 38 years, 321 days (2023)
- Oldest quarterback to throw for a touchdown – 38 years, 321 days (2023)

== Endorsements ==
Flacco signed a three-year contract with Reebok as a rookie in 2008. In 2009–2010, Flacco was a spokesperson for Pizza Hut, which sold a product called "Flacco's Favorites". Flacco has also endorsed Nike and 1st Mariner Bank, as well as Haribo since January 2013. Also in 2013, Flacco signed an endorsement deal with McDonald's to promote their new menu item, the Mighty Wings. Flacco has also teamed up with opendorse to promote a Zynga mobile application called "NFL Showdown: Football Manager" as well as a line of women's apparel for Spirit Football Jersey.

== Personal life ==
Flacco married his wife Dana in a Catholic ceremony in 2011, at the same church where his parents were married. Together they have five children; their first child, a son, was born in June 2012. Their second son was born September 15, 2013, about an hour before the start of the Ravens' home opener. Their third son was born in January 2015, which caused Flacco to decline his Pro Bowl invitation due to the two events' proximity. Their fourth son was born in April 2018. The Flaccos' only daughter was born in September 2016.

While playing for the Ravens, Flacco lived in the Baltimore suburb of Reisterstown, Maryland, until selling his home for $1.6 million in 2019 after being traded to the Denver Broncos.

Flacco is the oldest of the five boys in his family. His brothers are Mike, John, Brian, and Tom; he also has a sister, Stephanie. His brother Mike was selected in the 31st round of the 2009 Major League Baseball draft by the Baltimore Orioles. Another brother, John, was a walk-on receiver with the Stanford Cardinal football team. Joe's youngest brother, Tom Flacco, enrolled in 2015 at Western Michigan University, where he played quarterback for two seasons before transferring to Rutgers in 2017 and then Towson in 2018. In 2021, Tom was signed by the Saskatchewan Roughriders of the Canadian Football League.

In a survey by Fanatics in January 2017, Flacco was elected as the most attractive player in the NFL.

In 2018, Flacco made a donation of an undisclosed amount to University of Delaware athletics. It was the largest donation from a Delaware alumnus in the NFL. On May 25, 2024, Flacco received an honorary doctorate degree in Humane Letters from his alma mater, the University of Delaware.

In 2026, Flacco and his family were featured in the third season of the Netflix documentary series Quarterback.

== See also ==
- List of Baltimore Ravens first-round draft picks
- List of National Football League career passing yards leaders
