= 1921 Shaw Bears football team =

American college football season

1921 Shaw Bears football
- Conference: Colored Intercollegiate Athletic Association
- Record: ?–? (0–2 CIAA)
- Head coach: Henry B. Hucles (1st season)

1921 Colored Intercollegiate Athletic Association football standings
	Conf.					Overall
Team	W		L		T	W		L		T
Virginia Union $	3	–	0	–	0	6	–	0	–	2
Howard	4	–	1	–	0	7	–	1	–	0
Lincoln (PA)	2	–	1	–	0	8	–	1	–	0
Virginia Normal	1	–	1	–	0	2	–	1	–	1
Hampton	1	–	3	–	0	2	–	3	–	0
Shaw	0	–	2	–	0	?	–	?	–	0
Virginia Seminary	0	–	3	–	0	4	–	4	–	0
$ – Conference champion

The 1921 Shaw Bears football team was an American football team that represented Shaw University as a member of the Colored Intercollegiate Athletic Association (CIAA) during the 1921 college football season. The team was led by first-year head coach Henry B. Hucles.

== Schedule ==
Date	Time	Opponent	Site	Result	Source
October 15	3:00 p.m.	Kittrell*	League Park; Raleigh, NC	W 85–0	
October 21		Hampton	League Park; Raleigh, NC	L 6–7	
October 28		National Training School*	Raleigh, NC		
November 5		at Howard	Washington, DC	L 0–24	
November 11		at Livingstone*	Salisbury, NC	T 0–0	
*Non-conference game; All times are in Eastern time
