= 2006 Villanova Wildcats football team =

American college football season

2006 Villanova Wildcats football
- Conference: Atlantic 10 Conference
- South Division
- Record: 6–5 (5–3 A-10)
- Head coach: Andy Talley (22nd season)
- Offensive coordinator: Sam Venuto (8th season)
- Offensive scheme: Multiple spread
- Defensive coordinator: Mark Reardon (2nd season)
- Base defense: 4–2–5
- Home stadium: Villanova Stadium

2006 Atlantic 10 Conference football standings
	Conf.			Overall
Team	W		L	W		L
North Division
No. 2 UMass x$^	8	–	0	13	–	2
No. 6 New Hampshire ^	5	–	3	9	–	4
Maine	5	–	3	6	–	5
Northeastern	4	–	4	5	–	6
Rhode Island	2	–	6	4	–	7
Hofstra	1	–	7	2	–	9
South Division
No. 9 James Madison x^	7	–	1	9	–	3
Villanova	5	–	3	6	–	5
Towson	4	–	4	7	–	4
Richmond	3	–	5	6	–	5
Delaware	3	–	5	5	–	6
William & Mary	1	–	7	3	–	8
$ – Conference champion; x – Division champion/co-champions; ^ – FCS playoff participant; Rankings from The Sports Network poll

The 2006 Villanova Wildcats football team was an American football team that represented the Villanova University as a member of the Atlantic 10 Conference during the 2006 NCAA Division I FCS football season. In their 22nd year under head coach Andy Talley, the team compiled a 6–5 record.

== Schedule ==
Date	Time	Opponent	Site	TV	Result	Attendance	Source
September 2	6:00 p.m.	at UCF*	Citrus Bowl; Orlando, FL		L 16–35	29,398	
September 9		Lehigh*	Villanova Stadium; Villanova, PA		L 28–31	9,219	
September 16	1:00 p.m.	No. 9 UMass^{†}	Villanova Stadium; Villanova, PA	CN8	L 21–31	10,887	
September 23	7:00 p.m.	at Penn*	Franklin Field; Philadelphia, PA	CN8	W 27–20	22,499	
October 7		at Hofstra	James M. Shuart Stadium; Hempstead, NY		W 20–16	7,233	
October 14		at No. 23 Maine	Alfond Stadium; Orono, ME		L 7–20	6,658	
October 21		at Towson	Johnny Unitas Stadium; Towson, MD		L 13–21	8,111	
October 28	1:00 p.m.	at William & Mary	Zable Stadium; Williamsburg, VA		W 35–31	10,629	
November 4	6:00 p.m.	No. 15 Richmond	Villanova Stadium; Villanova, PA		W 31–21	5,851	
November 11	1:00 p.m.	James Madison	Villanova Stadium; Villanova, PA		W 21–20	7,751	
November 18	1:00 p.m.	at Delaware	Delaware Stadium; Newark, DE (rivalry)	CN8	W 28–27	21,894	
*Non-conference game; ^{†}Homecoming; Rankings from The Sports Network Poll released prior to the game; All times are in Eastern time
