= 2006 Rhode Island Rams football team =

American college football season

2006 Rhode Island Rams football
- Conference: Atlantic 10 Conference
- North Division
- Record: 4–7 (2–6 A-10)
- Head coach: Tim Stowers (7th season)
- Offensive coordinator: Harold Nichols (7th season)
- Defensive coordinator: Dick Hopkins (1st season)
- Home stadium: Meade Stadium

2006 Atlantic 10 Conference football standings
	Conf.			Overall
Team	W		L	W		L
North Division
No. 2 UMass x$^	8	–	0	13	–	2
No. 6 New Hampshire ^	5	–	3	9	–	4
Maine	5	–	3	6	–	5
Northeastern	4	–	4	5	–	6
Rhode Island	2	–	6	4	–	7
Hofstra	1	–	7	2	–	9
South Division
No. 9 James Madison x^	7	–	1	9	–	3
Villanova	5	–	3	6	–	5
Towson	4	–	4	7	–	4
Richmond	3	–	5	6	–	5
Delaware	3	–	5	5	–	6
William & Mary	1	–	7	3	–	8
$ – Conference champion; x – Division champion/co-champions; ^ – FCS playoff participant; Rankings from The Sports Network poll

The 2006 Rhode Island Rams football team was an American football team that represented the University of Rhode Island in the Atlantic 10 Conference during the 2006 NCAA Division I FCS football season. In their seventh season under head coach Tim Stowers, the Rams compiled a 4–7 record (2–6 against conference opponents) and finished fifth in the North Division of the Atlantic 10 Conference.

== Schedule ==
Date	Time	Opponent	Site	TV	Result	Attendance	Source
August 31	7:30 p.m.	at Connecticut*	Rentschler Field; East Hartford, CT (rivalry)		L 7–52	36,227	
September 9		Merrimack*	Meade Stadium; Kingston, RI		W 42–7	3,392	
September 23	12:00 p.m.	No. 18 Delaware	Meade Stadium; Kingston, RI		L 17–24	2,577	
September 30		Brown*	Meade Stadium; Kingston, RI (rivalry)		W 28–21	3,467	
October 7	12:05 p.m.	at No. 13 James Madison	Bridgeforth Stadium; Harrisonburg, VA		L 23–35	14,679	
October 14	12:00 p.m.	No. 10 Richmond	Meade Stadium; Kingston, RI		L 6–31	3,403	
October 21	1:00 p.m.	at No. 6 UMass	McGuirk Stadium; Hadley, MA	A10TV	L 16–41	15,522	
October 28		No. 15 Maine	Meade Stadium; Kingston, RI		W 3–0	3,250	
November 4		at Hofstra	James M. Shuart Stadium; Hempstead, NY		W 20–13	4,755	
November 11	12:00 p.m.	No. 13 New Hampshire	Meade Stadium; Kingston, RI		L 21–63	2,937	
November 17		at Northeastern	Parsons Field; Brookline, MA		L 31–45	3,212	
*Non-conference game; Rankings from The Sports Network Poll released prior to the game; All times are in Eastern time

== Coaching staff ==
Rhode Island Rams
Name	Position	Consecutive season at Rhode Island in current position	Previous position
Tim Stowers	Head coach	7th	Temple offensive coordinator (1999)
Harold Nichols	Associate head coach and offensive coordinator	1st	Rhode Island offensive coordinator and quarterbacks coach (2000–2005)
Dick Hopkins	Defensive coordinator	1st	The Citadel defensive coordinator (2004–2005)
Tony Brinson	Defensive line coach	3rd	Bryant special teams coordinator and defensive backs coach (2002–2003)
RaShan Frost	Defensive line coach	2nd	Illinois State defensive line coach (2002–2004)
Corey Barlow	Special teams coordinator and defensive backs coach	1st	Morehouse defensive backs coach (2002–2005)
John Gendron	Offensive line coach	1st	Bridgewater State linebackers coach (2004–2005)
Peter Quaweay	Cornerbacks coach	3rd	Duquesne defensive backs coach (2003)
Jeff Weaver	Special teams coordinator and a-backs coach	1st	Rhode Island wide receivers coach and a-backs coach (2005)
Chuck Watson	Wide receivers coach	1st	Cranston East HS (RI) assistant coach (1993–1995)
Matt Plumb	B-backs coach	1st	Bryant assistant coach (2005)
