= Hampton Pirates football =

College football team for Hampton University

2026 Hampton Pirates football team
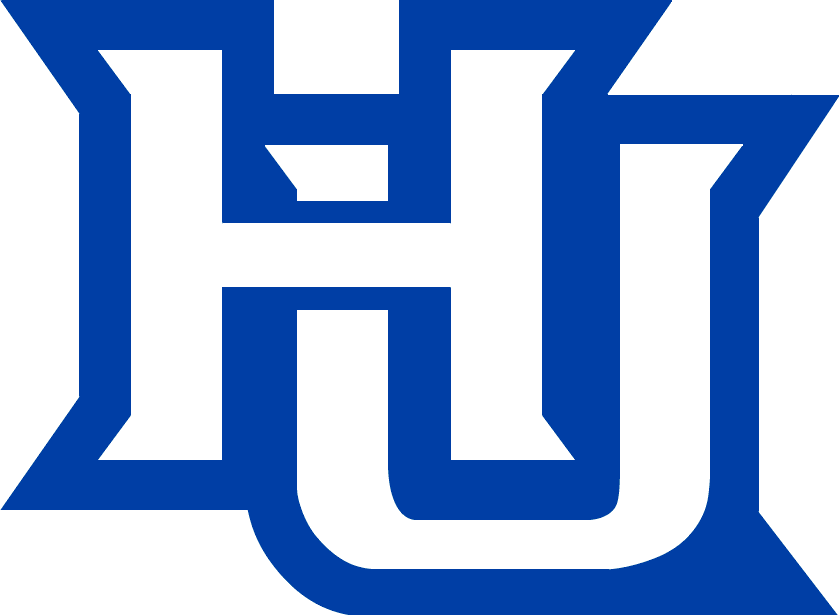
- First season: 1902; 124 years ago
- Head coach: Van Malone; 1st season, 0–0 (–)
- Location: Hampton, Virginia
- Stadium: Armstrong Stadium (capacity: 12,000)
- NCAA division: Division I FCS
- Conference: CAA Football
- Colors: Reflex blue and white
- All-time record: 585–468–36 (.554)

Black college national championships
- 1922, 1985, 1994, 1997, 2004, 2005, 2006

Conference championships
- CIAA: 1913, 1914, 1915, 1916, 1922, 1925, 1926, 1928, 1931, 1985, 1987, 1992, 1993, 1994 MEAC: 1997, 1998, 2004, 2005, 2006
- Rivalries: Howard (rivalry); Norfolk State (rivalry)
- Website: hamptonpirates.com/football

The Hampton Pirates football team represents Hampton University in college football. The Pirates compete in the NCAA Division I Football Championship Subdivision (FCS) as a member of CAA Football, the legally separate football league operated by the multi-sports Coastal Athletic Association (CAA).

== History ==
=== Classifications ===
- 1950–1972: NCAA College Division
- 1973–1994: NCAA Division II
- 1995–present: NCAA Division I–AA/FCS

=== Conference memberships ===
- 1902–1911: Independent
- 1912–1994: Central Intercollegiate Athletic Association
- 1995–2017: Mid-Eastern Athletic Conference
- 2018: Independent
- 2019–2021: Big South Conference
- 2022–present: CAA Football

== Championships ==
=== Black college national championships ===
Season	Coach	Selectors	Record
1922	Gideon Smith	PC	6–1
1985	Fred Freeman	Jet	10–2
1994	Joe Taylor	AURN	10–1
1997	Joe Taylor	AURN	10–2
2004	Joe Taylor	ASW, AURN, DCCC-M	10–2
2005	Joe Taylor	ADW, ASW	11–1
2006	Joe Taylor	ASW, BCSP, DCCC-M	10–2
Black college national championships			7

=== Conference championships ===
Year	Coach	Conference	Overall record	Conference record
1913	L. L. Pepin	Central Intercollegiate Athletics Association	6–0	4–0
1914†	Charles Holston Williams	Central Intercollegiate Athletics Association	3–1	2–1
1915	Charles Holston Williams	Central Intercollegiate Athletics Association	4–0	3–0
1916	Charles Holston Williams	Central Intercollegiate Athletics Association	4–0	3–0
1922	Gideon Smith	Central Intercollegiate Athletics Association	6–1	4–1
1925	Gideon Smith	Central Intercollegiate Athletics Association	4–1–1	4–1–1
1926	Gideon Smith	Central Intercollegiate Athletics Association	7–0–1	6–0–1
1928	Gideon Smith	Central Intercollegiate Athletics Association	8–1	8–0
1931	Gideon Smith	Central Intercollegiate Athletics Association	8–0–1	6–0–1
1985	Fred Freeman	Central Intercollegiate Athletics Association	10–2	7–1
1987	Fred Freeman	Central Intercollegiate Athletics Association	9–3	6–2
1992	Joe Taylor	Central Intercollegiate Athletics Association	9–2–1	5–0–1
1993	Joe Taylor	Central Intercollegiate Athletics Association	12–1	8–0
1994	Joe Taylor	Central Intercollegiate Athletics Association	10–1	8–0
1997	Joe Taylor	Mid-Eastern Athletic Conference	10–2	7–0
1998†	Joe Taylor	Mid-Eastern Athletic Conference	9–3	7–1
2004†	Joe Taylor	Mid-Eastern Athletic Conference	10–2	6–1
2005	Joe Taylor	Mid-Eastern Athletic Conference	11–1	8–0
2006	Joe Taylor	Mid-Eastern Athletic Conference	10–2	7–1
Conference championships			19	

== Notable alumni ==
Over 25 Hampton alumni have played or coached in the NFL, including:

- Jamal Brooks
- Chris Baker
- Darian Barnes
- Travis Coleman
- Reggie Doss
- Justin Durant
- Kenrick Ellis
- Mike Jenkins
- Kendall Langford
- Jerome Mathis
- Michael Ola
- Lucien Reeberg
- Carl Painter
- Greg Scott
- Zuriel Smith
- Ricardo Silva
- Derius Swinton II
- Cordell Taylor
- Terrence Warren
- Marcus Dixon
- Antico Dalton

In 2022, former Hampton Pirate defensive back, Destin Route, more well known as JID on-stage, was nominated for a Grammy for his rap album, The Forever Story.

Also in 2022, Pirates player Byron Perkins came out as gay, making him the first openly gay football player at any historically black college or university.

== Playoff appearances ==
=== NCAA Division I–AA/FCS ===
The Pirates have appeared in the I-AA/FCS playoffs five times with an overall record of 0–5.

Year	Round	Opponent	Result
1997	First Round	Youngstown State	L 13–28
1998	First Round	Connecticut	L 34–42
2004	First Round	William & Mary	L 35–42
2005	First Round	Richmond	L 10–38
2006	First Round	New Hampshire	L 38–41

=== NCAA Division II ===
The Pirates appeared in the Division II playoffs three times with an overall record of 1–3.

Year	Round	Opponent	Result
1985	First Round	Bloomsburg (PA)	L 28–38
1992	First Round	North Alabama	L 21–33
1993	First Round; Second Round	Albany State (GA); North Alabama	W 33–7; L 28–38

== Rivalries ==
- Battle of the Bay (Hampton–Norfolk State)
- The Real HU (Hampton–Howard)

== Future non-conference opponents ==
Announced schedules as of February 6, 2026.

2026	2027	2028	2029	2030
Virginia–Lynchburg	at Georgia Tech	at Old Dominion	at Virginia	at Morgan State
at Maryland				
at Norfolk State				
vs Howard (Washington, DC)				
