= 2006 William & Mary Tribe football team =

American college football season

2006 William & Mary Tribe football
- Conference: Atlantic 10 Conference
- South Division
- Record: 3–8 (1–7 A-10)
- Head coach: Jimmye Laycock (27th season)
- Offensive coordinator: Zbig Kepa (14th season)
- Captains: Elijah Brooks; Trevor McLaurin; Cody Morris; Alan Wheeling
- Home stadium: Zable Stadium

2006 Atlantic 10 Conference football standings
	Conf.			Overall
Team	W		L	W		L
North Division
No. 2 UMass x$^	8	–	0	13	–	2
No. 6 New Hampshire ^	5	–	3	9	–	4
Maine	5	–	3	6	–	5
Northeastern	4	–	4	5	–	6
Rhode Island	2	–	6	4	–	7
Hofstra	1	–	7	2	–	9
South Division
No. 9 James Madison x^	7	–	1	9	–	3
Villanova	5	–	3	6	–	5
Towson	4	–	4	7	–	4
Richmond	3	–	5	6	–	5
Delaware	3	–	5	5	–	6
William & Mary	1	–	7	3	–	8
$ – Conference champion; x – Division champion/co-champions; ^ – FCS playoff participant; Rankings from The Sports Network poll

The 2006 William & Mary Tribe football team represented the College of William & Mary as member of South Division of the Atlantic 10 Conference (A-10) during the 2006 NCAA Division I FCS football season. Led by Jimmye Laycock in his 27th year as head coach, William & Mary finished the season with an overall record of 3–8 and a mark of 1–7 in A-10 play, placing last out of six teams in the South Division. It was William & Mary's worst record in 24 years.

== Schedule ==
Date	Time	Opponent	Site	TV	Result	Attendance	Source
September 2	6:00 pm	at Maryland*	Byrd Stadium; College Park, MD	ESPN360	L 14–27	49,763	
September 16	7:00 pm	Maine*	Zable Stadium; Williamsburg, VA		L 17–20	10,706	
September 23	7:00 pm	VMI*	Zable Stadium; Williamsburg, VA (rivalry)		W 38–6	10,208	
September 30	1:00 pm	Hofstra	Zable Stadium; Williamsburg, VA	CSN	L 14–16	12,259	
October 7	1:00 pm	at No. 10 UMass	Warren McGuirk Alumni Stadium; Hadley, MA		L 7–48	15,822	
October 14	1:00 pm	at Liberty*	Williams Stadium; Lynchburg, VA		W 14–13	15,631	
October 21	3:00 pm	at No. 8 James Madison	Bridgeforth Stadium; Harrisonburg, VA (rivalry)		L 17–31	15,573	
October 28	1:00 pm	Villanova^{†}	Zable Stadium; Williamsburg, VA		L 31–35	10,629	
November 4	1:00 pm	at No. 21 Towson	Johnny Unitas Stadium; Towson, MD		W 29–28	2,465	
November 11	1:00 pm	at Delaware	Delaware Stadium; Newark, DE (rivalry)		L 28–14	20,655	
November 18	1:00 pm	Richmond	Zable Stadium; Williamsburg, VA (I-64 Bowl)		L 14–31	9,423	
*Non-conference game; ^{†}Homecoming; Rankings from The Sports Network Poll released prior to the game; All times are in Eastern time
