= 1922 Shaw Bears football team =

American college football season

1922 Shaw Bears football
- Conference: Colored Intercollegiate Athletic Association
- Record: 5–2–1 (1–1 CIAA)
- Head coach: Henry B. Hucles (2nd season)

1922 Colored Intercollegiate Athletic Association football standings
	Conf.					Overall
Team	W		L		T	W		L		T
Hampton $	4	–	1	–	0	6	–	1	–	0
Virginia Union	3	–	1	–	0	4	–	2	–	1
Shaw	1	–	1	–	0	5	–	2	–	1
Howard	2	–	2	–	0	4	–	2	–	0
Virginia Normal	2	–	3	–	0	4	–	4	–	0
Lincoln (PA)	1	–	2	–	0	6	–	3	–	0
Virginia Seminary	0	–	3	–	0	1	–	5	–	0
$ – Conference champion

The 1922 Shaw Bears football team was an American football team that represented Shaw University as a member of the Colored Intercollegiate Athletic Association (CIAA) during the 1922 college football season. Led by Henry B. Hucles in his second and final year as head coach the team compiled an overall record of 5–2–1 and a mark of 1–1 in conference play.

== Schedule ==
Date	Time	Opponent	Site	Result	Attendance	Source
		Bennett College*		W 37–0		
October 21		at Virginia Normal	Petersburg, VA	W 9–0		
October 23	3:30 p.m.	at Adelphia Social Club*	Hovey Field; Richmond, VA	L 3–6		
October 27		National Training School*	Raleigh, NC	W 31–0		
November 2		Livingstone*	Raleigh, NC	T 0–0		
		Aeolian Club of Norfolk*		W 35–0		
November 11	2:30 p.m.	at Hampton	Armstrong Field; Hampton, VA	L 0–7 (forfeit)	3,000	
November 25		at Saint Paul (VA)*	Lawrenceville, VA	W 3–2		
*Non-conference game; All times are in Eastern time
