= 1922 Hampton Seasiders football team =

American college football season

1922 Hampton Seasiders football

Black college national champion CIAA champion
- Conference: Colored Intercollegiate Athletic Association
- Record: 6–1 (4–1 CIAA)
- Head coach: Gideon Smith (2nd season)
- Captain: "Red" Dabney
- Home stadium: Armstrong Field

1922 Colored Intercollegiate Athletic Association football standings
	Conf.					Overall
Team	W		L		T	W		L		T
Hampton $	4	–	1	–	0	6	–	1	–	0
Virginia Union	3	–	1	–	0	4	–	2	–	1
Shaw	1	–	1	–	0	5	–	2	–	1
Howard	2	–	2	–	0	4	–	2	–	0
Virginia Normal	2	–	3	–	0	4	–	4	–	0
Lincoln (PA)	1	–	2	–	0	6	–	3	–	0
Virginia Seminary	0	–	3	–	0	1	–	5	–	0
$ – Conference champion

The 1922 Hampton Seasiders football team was an American football team that represented Hampton Institute in the Colored Intercollegiate Athletic Association (CIAA) during the 1922 college football season. In their second year under head coach Gideon Smith, the Pirates compiled a 6–1 record and outscored opponents by a total of 52 to 25. Hampton was recognized as the 1922 black college national co-champion.

Edward L. "Red" Dabney was the team captain. William S. Parker was the assistant coach. The team played its home games at Armstrong Field on the Institute's campus in Hampton, Virginia.

== Schedule ==
Date	Time	Opponent	Site	Result	Attendance	Source
October 14		Morgan*	Armstrong Field; Hampton, VA	W 6–0		
October 21	2:30 p.m.	at Saint Paul (VA)*	Russell Field; Lawrenceville, VA	W 3–0		
October 28		at Virginia Normal	Virginia Normal field; Petersburg, VA	L 6–12		
November 4		Lincoln (PA)	Armstrong Field; Hampton, VA	W 9–7	> 2,000	
November 11	2:30 p.m.	Shaw	Armstrong Field; Hampton, VA	W 7–0 (forfeit)	3,000	
November 18		at Howard	Howard campus; Washington, DC	W 13–0	> 2,000	
November 30		Virginia Union	Armstrong Field; Hampton VA	W 8–6		
*Non-conference game; All times are in Eastern time
