= 2006 James Madison Dukes football team =

American college football season

2006 James Madison Dukes football

A-10 South Division champion

NCAA Division I First Round, L 31–35 at Youngstown State
- Conference: Atlantic 10 Conference
- South Division
- Record: 9–3 (7–1 A-10)
- Head coach: Mickey Matthews (8th season)
- Offensive coordinator: Jeff Durden (3rd season)
- Defensive coordinator: George Barlow (3rd season)
- Home stadium: Bridgeforth Stadium

2006 Atlantic 10 Conference football standings
	Conf.			Overall
Team	W		L	W		L
North Division
No. 2 UMass x$^	8	–	0	13	–	2
No. 6 New Hampshire ^	5	–	3	9	–	4
Maine	5	–	3	6	–	5
Northeastern	4	–	4	5	–	6
Rhode Island	2	–	6	4	–	7
Hofstra	1	–	7	2	–	9
South Division
No. 9 James Madison x^	7	–	1	9	–	3
Villanova	5	–	3	6	–	5
Towson	4	–	4	7	–	4
Richmond	3	–	5	6	–	5
Delaware	3	–	5	5	–	6
William & Mary	1	–	7	3	–	8
$ – Conference champion; x – Division champion/co-champions; ^ – FCS playoff participant; Rankings from The Sports Network poll

The 2006 James Madison Dukes football team represented James Madison University in the 2006 NCAA Division I FCS football season. They were led by head coach Mickey Matthews and played their home games at Bridgeforth Stadium in Harrisonburg, Virginia. JMU finished the season 9–3 with a record of 7–1 in their final season as members of the Atlantic 10 Conference.

== Schedule ==
Date	Time	Opponent	Rank	Site	Result	Attendance	Source
September 2	6:00 pm	No. 7 (D-II) Bloomsburg*	No. 8	Bridgeforth Stadium; Harrisonburg, VA	W 14–3	14,462	
September 9	3:30 pm	at No. 1 Appalachian State*	No. 12	Kidd Brewer Stadium; Boone, NC	L 10–21	23,814	
September 23	6:00 pm	Northeastern	No. 17	Bridgeforth Stadium; Harrisonburg, VA	W 52–14	14,806	
September 30	1:00 pm	at VMI*	No. 15	Foster Stadium; Lexington, VA	W 45–7	8,830	
October 7	12:05 pm	Rhode Island	No. 13	Bridgeforth Stadium; Harrisonburg, VA	W 35–23	14,679	
October 14	12:05 pm	at No. 1 New Hampshire	No. 13	Cowell Stadium; Durham, NH	W 42–23	13,042	
October 21	3:00 pm	William & Mary^{†}	No. 8	Bridgeforth Stadium; Harrisonburg, VA (rivalry)	W 31–17	15,573	
October 28	3:00 pm	at No. 13 Richmond	No. 5	University of Richmond Stadium; Richmond, VA	W 27–10	11,150	
November 4	6:00 pm	Delaware	No. 4	Bridgeforth Stadium; Harrisonburg, VA (rivalry)	W 44–24	16,144	
November 11	1:00 pm	at Villanova	No. 4	Villanova Stadium; Villanova, PA	L 20–21	7,751	
November 18	1:00 pm	at No. 24 Towson	No. 7	Johnny Unitas Stadium; Towson, MD	W 38–3	4,533	
November 25	7:30 pm	at No. 5 Youngstown State*	No. 6	Stambaugh Stadium; Youngstown, OH (NCAA Division I First Round)	L 31–35	11,627	
*Non-conference game; ^{†}Homecoming; Rankings from The Sports Network Poll released prior to the game; All times are in Eastern time
