= 1922 Howard Bison football team =

American college football season

1922 Howard Bison football
- Conference: Colored Intercollegiate Athletic Association
- Record: 4–2 (2–2 CIAA)
- Head coach: Edward Morrison (3rd season)
- Home stadium: American League Park

1922 Colored Intercollegiate Athletic Association football standings
	Conf.					Overall
Team	W		L		T	W		L		T
Hampton $	4	–	1	–	0	6	–	1	–	0
Virginia Union	3	–	1	–	0	4	–	2	–	1
Shaw	1	–	1	–	0	5	–	2	–	1
Howard	2	–	2	–	0	4	–	2	–	0
Virginia Normal	2	–	3	–	0	4	–	4	–	0
Lincoln (PA)	1	–	2	–	0	6	–	3	–	0
Virginia Seminary	0	–	3	–	0	1	–	5	–	0
$ – Conference champion

The 1922 Howard Bison football team, also called the Blue and White, represented Howard University as a member of the Colored Intercollegiate Athletic Association (CIAA) during the 1922 college football season. Led by third-year head coach Edward Morrison, the Bison compiled an overall record of 4–2 with a mark of 2–2 in conference play, tying for third place in the CIAA.

== Schedule ==
Date	Time	Opponent	Site	Result	Attendance	Source
October 14		Virginia Seminary	Washington, DC	W 6–0		
October 21		North Carolina A&T*	Washington, DC	W 40–0		
November 4		Morgan*	Howard campus; Washington DC	W 52–6		
November 11		at Virginia Normal	Petersburg athletic field; Petersburg VA	W 7–6		
November 18		Hampton	Howard campus; Washington, DC	L 0–13	> 2,000	
November 30	10:30 a.m.	Lincoln (PA)	American League Park; Washington, DC	L 12–13	11,000–12,000	
*Non-conference game; All times are in Eastern time
