= 2006 Richmond Spiders football team =

American college football season

2006 Richmond Spiders football
- Conference: Atlantic 10 Conference
- South
- Record: 6–5 (3–5 A-10)
- Head coach: Dave Clawson (3rd season)
- Defensive coordinator: Russ Huesman (3rd season)
- Home stadium: University of Richmond Stadium

2006 Atlantic 10 Conference football standings
	Conf.			Overall
Team	W		L	W		L
North Division
No. 2 UMass x$^	8	–	0	13	–	2
No. 6 New Hampshire ^	5	–	3	9	–	4
Maine	5	–	3	6	–	5
Northeastern	4	–	4	5	–	6
Rhode Island	2	–	6	4	–	7
Hofstra	1	–	7	2	–	9
South Division
No. 9 James Madison x^	7	–	1	9	–	3
Villanova	5	–	3	6	–	5
Towson	4	–	4	7	–	4
Richmond	3	–	5	6	–	5
Delaware	3	–	5	5	–	6
William & Mary	1	–	7	3	–	8
$ – Conference champion; x – Division champion/co-champions; ^ – FCS playoff participant; Rankings from The Sports Network poll

The 2006 Richmond Spiders football team represented the University of Richmond during the 2006 NCAA Division I FCS football season. Richmond competed as a member of the Atlantic 10 Conference (A-10), and played their home games at the University of Richmond Stadium.

The Spiders were led by third-year head coach Dave Clawson. Richmond finished the regular season with a 6–5 overall record and a 3–5 record in conference play.

== Schedule ==
Date	Time	Opponent	Rank	Site	TV	Result	Attendance	Source
September 2	6:00 pm	at Duke*	No. 15	Wallace Wade Stadium; Durham, NC		W 13–0	27,546	
September 16	3:00 pm	VMI*	No. 8	UR Stadium; Richmond, VA		W 58–7	10,560	
September 23	1:00 pm	Bucknell*	No. 7	UR Stadium; Richmond, VA		W 48–21	4,900	
September 30	1:00 pm	Northeastern	No. 7	UR Stadium; Richmond, VA		W 12–7	5,620	
October 7	12:00 pm	at No. 1 New Hampshire	No. 7	Cowell Stadium; Durham, NH	CN8	L 17–27	8,299	
October 14	12:00 pm	at Rhode Island	No. 10	Meade Stadium; Kingston, RI		W 31–6	3,403	
October 21	6:00 pm	Delaware	No. 10	UR Stadium; Richmond, VA	CN8	L 24–28	6,200	
October 28	3:00 pm	No. 5 James Madison^{†}	No. 13	UR Stadium; Richmond, VA		L 10–27	11,150	
November 4	6:00 pm	at Villanova	No. 15	Villanova Stadium; Villanova, PA		L 21–31	5,851	
November 11	1:00 pm	Towson	No. 25	UR Stadium; Richmond, VA		L 7–31	5,150	
November 18	1:00 pm	at William & Mary		Zable Stadium; Williamsburg, VA (I-64 Bowl)		W 31–14	9,423	
*Non-conference game; ^{†}Homecoming; Rankings from The Sports Network Poll released prior to the game; All times are in Eastern time
