= 2006 UMass Minutemen football team =

American college football season

2006 UMass Minutemen football

A-10 champion Lambert Cup winner

FCS Championship Game, L 17–28 vs. Appalachian State
- Conference: Atlantic 10 Conference
- North

Ranking
- Sports Network: No. 2
- Record: 13–2 (8–0 A-10)
- Head coach: Don Brown (3rd season)
- Offensive coordinator: Kevin Morris (3rd season)
- Offensive scheme: Pro-style
- Defensive coordinator: Keith Dudzinski (3rd season)
- Base defense: 4–3
- Home stadium: Warren McGuirk Alumni Stadium

2006 Atlantic 10 Conference football standings
	Conf.			Overall
Team	W		L	W		L
North Division
No. 2 UMass x$^	8	–	0	13	–	2
No. 6 New Hampshire ^	5	–	3	9	–	4
Maine	5	–	3	6	–	5
Northeastern	4	–	4	5	–	6
Rhode Island	2	–	6	4	–	7
Hofstra	1	–	7	2	–	9
South Division
No. 9 James Madison x^	7	–	1	9	–	3
Villanova	5	–	3	6	–	5
Towson	4	–	4	7	–	4
Richmond	3	–	5	6	–	5
Delaware	3	–	5	5	–	6
William & Mary	1	–	7	3	–	8
$ – Conference champion; x – Division champion/co-champions; ^ – FCS playoff participant; Rankings from The Sports Network poll

The 2006 UMass Minutemen football team represented the University of Massachusetts Amherst in the 2006 NCAA Division I FCS football season as a member of the Atlantic 10 Conference. The team was coached by Don Brown and played its home games at Warren McGuirk Alumni Stadium in Hadley, Massachusetts. The Minutemen won their first conference title since 2003, and advanced all the way to the NCAA Division I Championship before falling to Appalachian State. 2006 was the last season of A-10 football, as all member programs would move over to the Colonial Athletic Association in the offseason. UMass finished the season with a record of 13–2 (8–0 A-10).

== Schedule ==
Date	Time	Opponent	Rank	Site	TV	Result	Attendance	Source
September 2	1:00 p.m.	Colgate*	No. 10	McGuirk Stadium; Hadley, MA		W 28–7	8,191	
September 9	1:30 p.m.	at Navy*	No. 9	Navy–Marine Corps Memorial Stadium; Annapolis, MD	CSTV	L 20–21	30,117	
September 16	1:00 p.m.	at Villanova	No. 9	Villanova Stadium; Villanova, PA	CN8	W 31–21	10,887	
September 23	1:00 p.m.	Stony Brook*	No. 9	McGuirk Stadium; Hadley, MA		W 48–7	9,001	
October 7	1:00 p.m.	William & Mary	No. 10	McGuirk Stadium; Hadley, MA		W 48–7	15,822	
October 14	3:00 p.m.	at No. 22 Towson	No. 8	Unitas Stadium; Towson, MD		W 35–0	6,820	
October 21	1:00 p.m.	Rhode Island^{†}	No. 6	McGuirk Stadium; Hadley, MA	A10TV	W 41–16	15,522	
October 28	1:00 p.m.	at Northeastern	No. 4	Parsons Field; Brookline, MA	CN8	W 7–0	550	
November 4	12:00 p.m.	at No. 9 New Hampshire	No. 3	Cowell Stadium; Durham, NH (rivalry)	CSTV	W 28–20	10,598	
November 11	12:00 p.m.	No. 19 Maine	No. 3	McGuirk Stadium; Hadley, MA		W 10–9	10,166	
November 18	12:00 p.m.	Hofstra	No. 3	McGuirk Stadium; Hadley, MA		W 22–16	9,211	
November 25	12:00 p.m.	Lafayette*	No. 3	McGuirk Stadium; Hadley, MA (NCAA Division I First Round)	CN8, LSN	W 35–14	5,388	
December 2	2:30 p.m.	No. 9 New Hampshire*	No. 3	McGuirk Stadium; Hadley, MA (NCAA Division I Quarterfinal)	ESPN Plus	W 24–17	17,000	
December 8	7:30 p.m.	at No. 2 Montana*	No. 3	Washington–Grizzly Stadium; Missoula, MT (NCAA Division I Semifinal)	ESPN2	W 19–17	23,454	
December 15	8:00 p.m.	vs. No. 1 Appalachian State*	No. 3	Finley Stadium; Chattanooga, TN (NCAA Division I Championship Game)	ESPN2	L 17–28	22,808	
*Non-conference game; ^{†}Homecoming; Rankings from The Sports Network Poll released prior to the game; All times are in Eastern time
