= Gideon Smith =

American football player and coach (1889–1961)

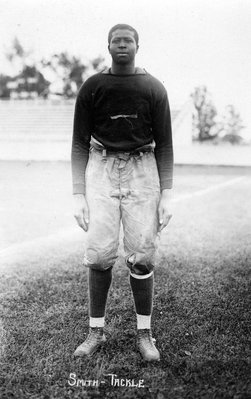

Biographical details
- Born: July 13, 1889; Norfolk County, Virginia, U.S.
- Died: May 6, 1968 (aged 78); Salem, Virginia, U.S.

Playing career
- 1915: Michigan Agricultural
- 1916: Canton Bulldogs
- Position: Tackle

Coaching career (HC unless noted)
- 1919: Virginia State
- 1921–1940: Hampton

Administrative career (AD unless noted)
- 1955–1958: EIAC (president)

Head coaching record
- Overall: 104–46–13

Accomplishments and honors

Championships
- 5 CIAA (1922, 1925–1926, 1928, 1931)

Gideon Edward Smith (July 13, 1889 – May 6, 1968), sometimes referred to as G. E. Smith, was an American football player and coach.

Smith played college football at Michigan Agricultural College (MAC), now known as Michigan State University, from 1913 to 1915. He was the first African-American varsity athlete in any sport at MAC.

Smith also played one game of professional football while still attending MAC. He appeared as a tackle in one game for the Canton Bulldogs of the Ohio League, becoming one of the first African-Americans to play professional football. He played for the Bulldogs as a late fourth-quarter substitute on November 28, 1916, against their rivals, the Massillon Tigers. During that game he made a game-saving fumble recovery that preserved a 6–0 Canton victory over the Tigers for the "state championship." Smith was the last African-American to play professional football exclusively prior to the formation of the National Football League.

After graduating from MAC in 1916, Smith became a teacher at the West Virginia Collegiate Institute, now known as West Virginia State University. He also served in 1920 as a teacher at the Virginia State College for Negroes—now known as Virginia State University—in Matoaca, Virginia.

In 1921, Smith became the head football coach at Hampton Institute, now known as Hampton University, in Hampton, Virginia.

Smith served as president of the Eastern Intercollegiate Athletic Conference (EIAC) from December 1955 to December 1958. He died on May 6, 1968, at Veterans Administration Hospital in Salem, Virginia, following a long illness. He was inducted into the Hampton Athletics Hall of Fame in 2009.

== Head coaching record ==
Year	Team	Overall	Conference	Standing	Bowl/playoffs
Virginia State Trojans () (1919)
1919	Virginia State	5–1–1			
Virginia State:		5–1–1			
Hampton Seasiders/Pirates (Colored Intercollegiate Athletic Association) (1921–1940)
1921	Hampton	1–4	0–4	7th	
1922	Hampton	6–1	4–1	1st	
1923	Hampton	5–2	4–2	3rd	
1924	Hampton	5–2–1	4–2–1	3rd	
1925	Hampton	4–1–1	4–1–1	1st	
1926	Hampton	7–0–1	6–0–1	1st	
1927	Hampton	5–1–1	5–1–1	2nd	
1928	Hampton	8–1	8–0	1st	
1929	Hampton	3–5	3–4	T–4th	
1930	Hampton	7–1–1	6–1	2nd	
1931	Hampton	8–0–1	6–0–1	1st	
1932	Hampton	5–2–1	5–2–1	4th	
1933	Hampton	7–1–1	7–1–1	2nd	
1934	Hampton	3–5	3–5	T–7th	
1935	Hampton	7–1	7–1	2nd	
1936	Hampton	5–2–1	5–2–1	4th	
1937	Hampton	3–6	2–5	10th	
1938	Hampton	4–3–1	3–3–1	T–6th	
1939	Hampton	3–3–1	3–3–1	7th	
1940	Hampton	3–4–1	3–4–1	10th	
Hampton:		99–45–12	88–42–11		
Total:		104–46–13			
National championship Conference title Conference division title or championship game berth
