= 2006 Maine Black Bears football team =

American college football season

2006 Maine Black Bears football
- Conference: Atlantic 10 Conference
- North Division
- Record: 6–5 (5–3 A-10)
- Head coach: Jack Cosgrove (14th season)
- Offensive coordinator: Bobby Wilder (7th season)
- Captains: Mike DeVito; Matt King; Ron Whitcomb
- Home stadium: Alfond Stadium

2006 Atlantic 10 Conference football standings
| | Conf. | | | Overall |
| Team | W | | L | W | | L |
|---|---|---|---|---|---|---|
North Division
| No. 2 UMass x$^ | 8 | – | 0 | 13 | – | 2 |
| No. 6 New Hampshire ^ | 5 | – | 3 | 9 | – | 4 |
| Maine | 5 | – | 3 | 6 | – | 5 |
| Northeastern | 4 | – | 4 | 5 | – | 6 |
| Rhode Island | 2 | – | 6 | 4 | – | 7 |
| Hofstra | 1 | – | 7 | 2 | – | 9 |
South Division
| No. 9 James Madison x^ | 7 | – | 1 | 9 | – | 3 |
| Villanova | 5 | – | 3 | 6 | – | 5 |
| Towson | 4 | – | 4 | 7 | – | 4 |
| Richmond | 3 | – | 5 | 6 | – | 5 |
| Delaware | 3 | – | 5 | 5 | – | 6 |
| William & Mary | 1 | – | 7 | 3 | – | 8 |
$ – Conference champion; x – Division champion/co-champions; ^ – FCS playoff participant; Rankings from The Sports Network poll

The 2006 Maine Black Bears football team was an American football team that represented the University of Maine as a member of the Atlantic 10 Conference during the 2006 NCAA Division I FCS football season. In their 14th season under head coach Jack Cosgrove, the Black Bears compiled a 6–5 record (5–3 against conference opponents) and tied for second in the Atlantic 10's North Division. Mike DeVito, Matt King, and Ron Whitcomb were the team captains.

== Schedule ==
| Date | Time | Opponent | Rank | Site | TV | Result | Attendance | Source |
|---|---|---|---|---|---|---|---|---|
| September 9 | | at Youngstown State* | | Stambaugh Stadium; Youngstown, OH | | L 14–34 | 15,867 | |
| September 16 | 7:00 p.m. | at William & Mary | | Zable Stadium; Williamsburg, VA | | W 20–17 | 10,706 | |
| September 23 | | Shaw* | | Alfond Stadium; Orono, ME | | W 62–12 | | |
| September 30 | 1:00 p.m. | at Boston College* | | Alumni Stadium; Chestnut Hill, MA | ESPN360 | L 0–22 | 41,162 | |
| October 7 | | at No. 17 Towson | | Johnny Unitas Stadium; Towson, MD | | W 28–7 | | |
| October 14 | | Villanova | No. 23 | Alfond Stadium; Orono, ME | | W 20–7 | 6,658 | |
| October 21 | | Hofstra | No. 19 | Alfond Stadium; Orono, ME | | W 21–10 | | |
| October 28 | | at Rhode Island | No. 15 | Meade Stadium; Kingston, RI | | L 0–3 | 3,250 | |
| November 4 | | Northeastern | No. 22 | Alfond Stadium; Orono, ME | | W 30–3 | | |
| November 11 | 12:00 p.m. | at No. 3 UMass | No. 19 | McGuirk Stadium; Hadley, MA | | L 9–10 | 10,166 | |
| November 18 | 12:00 p.m. | New Hampshire | No. 22 | Alfond Stadium; Orono, ME (Battle for the Brice–Cowell Musket) | | L 13–19 ^{OT} | 4,834 | |
*Non-conference game; Rankings from The Sports Network Poll released prior to the game; All times are in Eastern time

== After the season ==
The following Black Bear was selected in the 2007 NFL draft after the season.

| Round | Pick | Player | Position | NFL club |
|---|---|---|---|---|
| 6 | 203 | Daren Stone | Defensive back | Atlanta Falcons |
