= 2006 Towson Tigers football team =

American college football season

2006 Towson Tigers football
- Conference: Atlantic 10 Conference
- South Division
- Record: 7–4 (4–4 A-10)
- Head coach: Gordy Combs (15th season)
- Defensive coordinator: Bob Benson (1st season)
- Home stadium: Johnny Unitas Stadium

2006 Atlantic 10 Conference football standings
	Conf.			Overall
Team	W		L	W		L
North Division
No. 2 UMass x$^	8	–	0	13	–	2
No. 6 New Hampshire ^	5	–	3	9	–	4
Maine	5	–	3	6	–	5
Northeastern	4	–	4	5	–	6
Rhode Island	2	–	6	4	–	7
Hofstra	1	–	7	2	–	9
South Division
No. 9 James Madison x^	7	–	1	9	–	3
Villanova	5	–	3	6	–	5
Towson	4	–	4	7	–	4
Richmond	3	–	5	6	–	5
Delaware	3	–	5	5	–	6
William & Mary	1	–	7	3	–	8
$ – Conference champion; x – Division champion/co-champions; ^ – FCS playoff participant; Rankings from The Sports Network poll

The 2006 Towson Tigers football team represented Towson University as a member of the Atlantic 10 Conference (A-10) during the 2006 NCAA Division I FCS football season. Led by 15th-year head coach Gordy Combs, the Tigers compiled an overall record of 7–4 with a mark of 4–4 in conference play, placing third in the A-10's South Division. The team played home games at Johnny Unitas Stadium in Towson, Maryland.

== Schedule ==
Date	Time	Opponent	Rank	Site	Result	Attendance	Source
September 2		Morgan State*		Johnny Unitas Stadium; Towson, MD (The Battle for Greater Baltimore)	W 30–2	4,484	
September 9	6:00 p.m.	at Elon*		Rhodes Stadium; Elon, NC	W 24–17	7,544	
September 16	6:00 p.m.	Liberty*		Johnny Unitas Stadium; Towson, MD	W 10–3	4,665	
September 23		at Hofstra	No. 21	James M. Shuart Stadium; Hempstead, NY	W 33–30		
October 7		Maine	No. 17	Johnny Unitas Stadium; Towson, MD	L 7–28		
October 14	3:00 p.m.	No. 8 UMass	No. 22	Johnny Unitas Stadium; Towson, MD	L 0–35	6,820	
October 21		Villanova^{†}		Johnny Unitas Stadium; Towson, MD	W 21–13	8,111	
October 28	1:00 p.m.	at No. 25 Delaware		Delaware Stadium; Newark, DE	W 49–35	22,136	
November 4	1:00 p.m.	William & Mary	No. 21	Johnny Unitas Stadium; Towson, MD	L 28–29	2,465	
November 11	1:00 p.m.	at No. 25 Richmond		University of Richmond Stadium; Richmond, VA	W 31–7	5,150	
November 18	1:00 p.m.	No. 7 James Madison	No. 24	Johnny Unitas Stadium; Towson, MD	L 3–38	4,533	
*Non-conference game; ^{†}Homecoming; Rankings from The Sports Network Poll released prior to the game; All times are in Eastern time
