= 2006 Delaware Fightin' Blue Hens football team =

American college football season

2006 Delaware Fightin' Blue Hens football
- Conference: Atlantic 10 Conference
- South Division
- Record: 5–6 (3–5 A-10)
- Head coach: K. C. Keeler (5th season)
- Offensive coordinator: Kirk Ciarrocca (5th season)
- Offensive scheme: Spread
- Defensive coordinator: Nick Rapone (1st season)
- Base defense: 4–3
- Home stadium: Delaware Stadium

2006 Atlantic 10 Conference football standings
	Conf.			Overall
Team	W		L	W		L
North Division
No. 2 UMass x$^	8	–	0	13	–	2
No. 6 New Hampshire ^	5	–	3	9	–	4
Maine	5	–	3	6	–	5
Northeastern	4	–	4	5	–	6
Rhode Island	2	–	6	4	–	7
Hofstra	1	–	7	2	–	9
South Division
No. 9 James Madison x^	7	–	1	9	–	3
Villanova	5	–	3	6	–	5
Towson	4	–	4	7	–	4
Richmond	3	–	5	6	–	5
Delaware	3	–	5	5	–	6
William & Mary	1	–	7	3	–	8
$ – Conference champion; x – Division champion/co-champions; ^ – FCS playoff participant; Rankings from The Sports Network poll

The 2006 Delaware Fightin' Blue Hens football team represented the University of Delaware as a member of the South Division of the Atlantic 10 Conference (A-10) during the 2006 NCAA Division I FCS football season. Led by fifth-year head coach K. C. Keeler, the Fightin' Blue Hens compiled an overall record of 5–6 with a mark of 3–5 in conference play, tying for fourth place in the A-10's South Division. The team played home games at Delaware Stadium in Newark, Delaware.

== Schedule ==
Date	Time	Opponent	Rank	Site	TV	Result	Attendance	Source
September 9	7:00 pm	West Chester*	No. 16	Delaware Stadium; Newark, DE (rivalry)		W 30–7	22,329	
September 16	7:00 pm	Albany*	No. 11	Delaware Stadium; Newark, DE		L 10–17	22,016	
September 23	12:00 pm	at Rhode Island	No. 18	Meade Stadium; Kingston, RI		W 24–17	2,577	
September 30	7:00 pm	No. 1 New Hampshire	No. 17	Delaware Stadium; Newark, DE	CN8	L 49–52	22,055	
October 7	12:00 pm	Northeastern	No. 18	Parsons Field; Brookline, MA		L 24–27	3,125	
October 14	12:00 pm	Hofstra*^{†}		Delaware Stadium; Newark, DE		W 10–6	21,688	
October 21	6:00 pm	at No. 10 Richmond		University of Richmond Stadium; Richmond, VA	CN8	W 28–24	6,200	
October 28	1:00 pm	Towson	No. 25	Delaware Stadium; Newark, DE		L 35–49	22,136	
November 4	6:00 pm	at No. 4 James Madison		Bridgeforth Stadium; Harrisonburg, VA (rivalry)	CN8	L 24–44	16,144	
November 11	1:00 pm	at William & Mary		Zable Stadium; Williamsburg, VA (rivalry)		W 28–14	20,655	
November 18	1:00 pm	Villanova		Delaware Stadium; Newark, DE (Battle of the Blue)	CN8	L 27–28	21,894	
*Non-conference game; ^{†}Homecoming; Rankings from The Sports Network Poll released prior to the game; All times are in Eastern time
