= 2006 New Hampshire Wildcats football team =

American college football season

2006 New Hampshire Wildcats football

NCAA Division I Quarterfinal, L 34–36 vs. UMass
- Conference: Atlantic 10 Conference
- North Division

Ranking
- Sports Network: No. 8
- FCS Coaches: No. 7
- Record: 9–4 (5–3 A-10)
- Head coach: Sean McDonnell (8th season)
- Offensive coordinator: Chip Kelly (8th season)
- Home stadium: Cowell Stadium

2006 Atlantic 10 Conference football standings
	Conf.			Overall
Team	W		L	W		L
North Division
No. 2 UMass x$^	8	–	0	13	–	2
No. 6 New Hampshire ^	5	–	3	9	–	4
Maine	5	–	3	6	–	5
Northeastern	4	–	4	5	–	6
Rhode Island	2	–	6	4	–	7
Hofstra	1	–	7	2	–	9
South Division
No. 9 James Madison x^	7	–	1	9	–	3
Villanova	5	–	3	6	–	5
Towson	4	–	4	7	–	4
Richmond	3	–	5	6	–	5
Delaware	3	–	5	5	–	6
William & Mary	1	–	7	3	–	8
$ – Conference champion; x – Division champion/co-champions; ^ – FCS playoff participant; Rankings from The Sports Network poll

The 2006 New Hampshire Wildcats football team represented the University of New Hampshire in the 2006 NCAA Division I FCS football season. The Wildcats were led by eight-year head coach Sean McDonnell and played their home games at Cowell Stadium in Durham, New Hampshire. They were a member of the Atlantic 10 Conference (A-10) and moved to the Colonial Athletic Association (CAA) following the conclusion of the season. They finished the season 9–4 overall and 5–3 in A–10 play. They received an at-large bid into the FCS playoffs where they lost in the quarterfinals to UMass.

== Schedule ==
Date	Time	Opponent	Rank	Site	TV	Result	Attendance
September 9	2:00 pm	at Northwestern*	No. 2	Ryan Field; Evanston, IL		W 34–17	20,108
September 16	12:00 pm	Stony Brook*	No. 1	Cowell Stadium; Durham, NH		W 62–7	7,395
September 23	12:00 pm	at Dartmouth*	No. 1	Memorial Field; Hanover, NH (rivalry)	WMUR	W 56–14	7,023
September 30	7:00 pm	at No. 17 Delaware	No. 1	Delaware Stadium; Newark, DE	CN8	W 52–49	22,055
October 7	12:00 pm	No. 7 Richmond	No. 1	Cowell Stadium; Durham, NH	CN8	W 27–17	8,299
October 14	12:00 pm	No. 13 James Madison^{†}	No. 1	Cowell Stadium; Durham, NH	CN8	L 23–42	13,042
October 21	2:00 pm	at Northeastern	No. 7	Parsons Field; Brookline, MA		L 35–36 ^{OT}	6,135
October 28	12:00 pm	Hofstra	No. 11	Cowell Stadium; Durham, NH		W 10–6	1,372
November 4	12:00 pm	No. 3 UMass	No. 9	Cowell Stadium; Durham, NH (rivalry)	CSTV	L 20–28	10,598
November 11	12:00 pm	at Rhode Island	No. 13	Meade Stadium; Kingston, RI		W 63–21	2,937
November 22	12:00 pm	at No. 22 Maine	No. 10	Alfond Stadium; Orono, ME (Battle for the Brice–Cowell Musket)		W 19–13 ^{OT}	4,834
November 25	1:00 pm	at No. 8 Hampton*	No. 9	Armstrong Stadium; Hampton, VA (NCAA Division I First Round)		W 41–38	3,401
December 2	2:30 pm	at No. 3 UMass*	No. 9	Warren McGuirk Alumni Stadium; Amherst, MA (NCAA Division I Quarterfinal)	ESPN+	L 17–24	17,000
*Non-conference game; ^{†}Homecoming; Rankings from The Sports Network Poll released prior to the game; All times are in Eastern time
