= Henry B. Hucles III =

The Right Reverend Henry Boyd Hucles III
- Suffragan Bishop of Long Island
- Church: Episcopal Church
- Diocese: Long Island
- Elected: March 14, 1981
- In office: 1981–1988

Orders
- Ordination: September 1947 by Wiley Roy Mason
- Consecration: June 20, 1981 by John Allin

Personal details
- Born: September 21, 1923 New York City, New York, United States
- Died: August 4, 1989 (aged 65) Virginia, United States
- Buried: Riverview Cemetery in Richmond, Virginia
- Denomination: Anglican
- Parents: Henry B. Hucles, Jr. and Alma Leola Lewis
- Spouse: Mamie Dalceda Adams
- Children: 2

Henry Boyd Hucles III (September 21, 1923 – August 4, 1989) was suffragan bishop of the Episcopal Diocese of Long Island, serving from his consecration on June 20, 1981, to his death in 1989.

== Biography ==
Hucles was born in New York City on September 21, 1923, the son of the coach and college administrator Henry B. Hucles, Jr. and Alma Leola Lewis. He was educated in public school in New York City and later graduated from Virginia Union University with a Bachelor of Science in 1943. He then attended Bishop Payne Divinity School, which later merged with Virginia Theological Seminary, and graduated with a Bachelor of Divinity in 1946.

He was made deacon in July 1946 and ordained priest in September 1947 by Wiley Roy Mason, Suffragan Bishop of Virginia. On September 18, 1948, he married Mamie Dalceda Adams; together they had two children. After ordination he became priest-in-charge of Grace Church in Millers Tavern, Virginia, and of St Andrews Church in Upright, Virginia. In 1949 he became rector of St George's Church in Brooklyn, New York, eventually later becoming Archdeacon of Brooklyn, New York in 1979. He also became a member of the cathedral canons.

On March 14, 1981, Hucles was elected Suffragan Bishop of Long Island on the seventh ballot in the Cathedral of the Incarnation, Garden City, New York. He was then consecrated on June 20, 1981, with Presiding Bishop John Allin as chief consecrator at the Cathedral of the Incarnation, Garden City, New York. He retired his post in 1988 and died a year later on August 4, 1989, in Virginia.
