= Henry B. Hucles =

American sports coach and college athletics administrator

Biographical details
- Born: November 11, 1897; Petersburg, Virginia, U.S.
- Died: September 11, 1979 (aged 81); Brooklyn, New York, U.S.

Playing career

Football
- 1919: Virginia Union
- 1920–1921: NYU
- Positions: Quarterback, halfback

Coaching career (HC unless noted)

Football
- 1919–1920: Virginia Union
- 1921–1922: Shaw
- 1923–1925: Prairie View
- 1926–1942: Virginia Union

Basketball
- ?–1950: Virginia Union

Baseball
- 1925: Prairie View A&M
- ?: Virginia Union

Administrative career (AD unless noted)
- 1926–1950: Virginia Union

Henry Boyd Hucles Jr. (November 11, 1897 – September 11, 1979) was an American football, basketball, and baseball coach and college athletics administrator. He served as the head football coach at Virginia Union University from 1919 to 1920 and again from 1926 to 1942 and at Prairie View A&M University from 1923 to 1925. Hucles was also the athletic director at Virginia Union from 1926 to 1950. His son, Henry B. Hucles III, became a suffragan bishop in the Episcopal Diocese of Long Island.

He was inducted into the Virginia Sports Hall of Fame in 1997.

== Early life and education ==
Hucles was born in Petersburg, Virginia on November 11, 1897. In 1917, he studied at Wayland Academy in Washington D.C. before attending studying physics at Virginia Union University from 1919 to 1920. While at Virginia Union he founded the Zeta chapter of Omega Psi Phi and earned All-American honors as a quarterback for the Virginia Union Panthers. As a senior, he was player-coach for the team. He graduated with a BSc from Springfield College in 1933. He was instrumental in the establishment of the Richmond Coliseum.

== Coaching career ==
Hucles became the first Virginia Union University student athlete to then become a coach at the school, serving as the player football coach from 1919 to 1920 and then as the head football coach from 1926 to 1942 as well as athletic director and a professor of health and physical education. From 1938 to 1943, he also served as Virginia Union's basketball coach, leading the team to a Central Intercollegiate Athletic Association (CIAA) title in the 1938–39 season. From 1942 to 1943, future Baseball Hall of Famer Larry Doby, played on the Virginia Union basketball team under Hucles.

In 1921, he spent a year coaching at Shaw University.

Hucles was the first head football coach at Prairie View A&M University in Prairie View, Texas and he held that position for two seasons, from 1924 until 1925. His career coaching record at Prairie View was 11–4–1.

== Death ==
Hucles died in Brooklyn, New York in 1979.

== Head coaching record ==
=== College ===
Year	Team	Overall	Conference	Standing	Bowl/playoffs
Virginia Union Panthers (Colored Intercollegiate Athletic Association) (1919–1920)
1919	Virginia Union	5–1–1	1–1	3rd	
1920	Virginia Union	6–2	2–1	2nd	
Shaw Bears (Colored Intercollegiate Athletic Association) (1921–1922)
1921	Shaw		0–2	6th	
1922	Shaw	5–2–1	1–1	T–3rd	
Shaw:			1–3		
Prairie View Panthers (Southwestern Athletic Conference) (1923–1925)
1923	Prairie View	5–2	3–2	3rd	
1924	Prairie View	5–1–1	3–1–1		
1925	Prairie View	6–3	3–2	3rd	
Prairie View:		16–6–1	9–5–1		
Virginia Union Panthers (Colored Intercollegiate Athletic Association) (1926–1942)
1926	Virginia Union	6–1	6–1	2nd	
1927	Virginia Union	5–2	5–2	3rd	
1928	Virginia Union	2–6–1	2–3–1	5th	
1929	Virginia Union	7–1	5–1	2nd	
1930	Virginia Union	6–1–2	5–1–2	2nd	
1931	Virginia Union	4–4–1	3–3–1	10th	
1932	Virginia Union	7–1–1	6–1–1	T–2nd	
1933	Virginia Union	4–3–4	4–2–3	4th	
1934	Virginia Union	4–2–2	4–2–2	4th	
1935	Virginia Union	4–3–1	4–3–1	6th	
1936	Virginia Union	2–5–1	2–5–1	T–9th	
1937	Virginia Union	7–2	7–2	3rd	
1938	Virginia Union	5–2–2	4–2–2	4th	
1939	Virginia Union	5–4	3–4	9th	
1940	Virginia Union	6–2–2	4–2–2	4th	
1941	Virginia Union	4–4	2–4	7th	
1942	Virginia Union	3–5	1–4	9th	
Virginia Union:		92–51–18	70–44–16		
Total:					

== See also ==
- List of college football head coaches with non-consecutive tenure
