= 2006 Northern Colorado Bears football team =

American college football season

2006 Northern Colorado Bears football
- Conference: Big Sky Conference
- Record: 1–10 (0–8 Big Sky)
- Head coach: Scott Downing (1st season)
- Home stadium: Nottingham Field

2006 Big Sky Conference football standings
	Conf.			Overall
Team	W		L	W		L
No. 3 Montana $^	8	–	0	12	–	2
No. 10 Montana State ^	6	–	2	8	–	5
No. 19 Portland State	6	–	2	7	–	4
Northern Arizona	5	–	3	6	–	5
Sacramento State	4	–	4	4	–	7
Weber State	3	–	5	4	–	7
Eastern Washington	3	–	5	3	–	8
Idaho State	1	–	7	2	–	9
Northern Colorado	0	–	8	1	–	10
$ – Conference champion; ^ – FCS playoff participant; Rankings from The Sports Network poll

The 2006 Northern Colorado Bears football team represented the University of Northern Colorado as a member of the Big Sky Conference during the 2006 NCAA Division I FCS football season. Led by first-year head coach Scott Downing, the Bears compiled an overall record of 1–10, with a mark of 0–8 in conference play, and finished ninth in the Big Sky. The team played home games at Nottingham Field in Greeley, Colorado.

On September 11, starting punter Rafael Mendoza was stabbed in the leg by backup punter Mitchell Cozad. Mendoza returned to the field for the September 23 game against Western Illinois. Cozad was convicted of second-degree assault for the stabbing in 2007.

== Schedule ==
Date	Opponent	Site	Result	Attendance	Source
September 2	UC Davis*	Nottingham Field; Greeley, CO	L 7–38	6,072	
September 9	at No. 21 Portland State	PGE Park; Portland, OR	L 3–45	4,936	
September 16	at No. 23 Texas State*	Bobcat Stadium; San Marcos, TX	W 14–13	11,870	
September 23	Western Illinois*	Nottingham Field; Greeley, CO	L 28–42	6,219	
September 28	at Weber State	Stewart Stadium; Ogden, UT	L 21–26	5,115	
October 7	Idaho State	Nottingham Field; Greeley, CO	L 13–41	2,910	
October 14	Eastern Washington	Nottingham Field; Greeley, CO	L 0–34	6,012	
October 28	at Sacramento State	Hornet Stadium; Sacramento, CA	L 9–14	4,109	
November 4	at No. 19 Montana State	Bobcat Stadium; Bozeman, MT	L 10–13	13,177	
November 11	No. 2 Montana	Nottingham Field; Greeley, CO	L 21–53	4,632	
November 18	Northern Arizona	Nottingham Field; Greeley, CO	L 3–54	3,012	
*Non-conference game; Rankings from The Sports Network Poll released prior to the game
