= 2006 Idaho State Bengals football team =

American college football season

2006 Idaho State Bengals football
- Conference: Big Sky Conference
- Record: 2–9 (1–7 Big Sky)
- Head coach: Larry Lewis (8th season)
- Offensive coordinator: Bruce Barnum (6th season)
- Offensive scheme: Pro spread
- Defensive coordinator: James Ward (7th season)
- Base defense: 4–3
- Home stadium: Holt Arena

2006 Big Sky Conference football standings
	Conf.			Overall
Team	W		L	W		L
No. 3 Montana $^	8	–	0	12	–	2
No. 10 Montana State ^	6	–	2	8	–	5
No. 19 Portland State	6	–	2	7	–	4
Northern Arizona	5	–	3	6	–	5
Sacramento State	4	–	4	4	–	7
Weber State	3	–	5	4	–	7
Eastern Washington	3	–	5	3	–	8
Idaho State	1	–	7	2	–	9
Northern Colorado	0	–	8	1	–	10
$ – Conference champion; ^ – FCS playoff participant; Rankings from The Sports Network poll

The 2006 Idaho State Bengals football team represented Idaho State University as a member of the Big Sky Conference during the 2006 NCAA Division I FCS football season. Led by eighth-year head coach Larry Lewis, the Bengals compiled an overall record of 2–9, with a mark of 1–7 in conference play, and finished eighth in the Big Sky. The team played home games at Holt Arena in Pocatello, Idaho.

== Schedule ==
Date	Opponent	Site	Result	Attendance	Source
September 2	at UNLV*	Sam Boyd Stadium; Whitney, NV	L 10–54	19,943	
September 9	Fort Lewis*	Holt Arena; Pocatello, ID	W 48–12		
September 16	at Idaho*	Kibbie Dome; Moscow, ID (rivalry)	L 24–27	15,162	
September 23	Northern Arizona	Holt Arena; Pocatello, ID	L 27–33	10,016	
October 7	at Northern Colorado	Nottingham Field; Greeley, CO	W 41–13	2,910	
October 14	at No. 25 Portland State	PGE Park; Portland, OR	L 13–34	4,549	
October 21	Montana State	Holt Arena; Pocatello, ID	L 35–42	7,773	
October 28	at No. 2 Montana	Washington–Grizzly Stadium; Missoula, MT	L 10–23	23,435	
November 4	Sacramento State	Holt Arena; Pocatello, ID	L 14–22	6,298	
November 11	at Eastern Washington	Woodward Field; Cheney, WA	L 6–40	3,818	
November 18	Weber State	Holt Arena; Pocatello, ID	L 27–30	6,744	
*Non-conference game; Rankings from The Sports Network Poll released prior to the game
