= 2006 South Carolina State Bulldogs football team =

American college football season

2006 South Carolina State Bulldogs football
- Conference: Mid-Eastern Athletic Conference
- Record: 7–4 (6–2 MEAC)
- Head coach: Oliver Pough (5th season)
- Home stadium: Oliver C. Dawson Stadium; Johnson Hagood Stadium

2006 Mid-Eastern Athletic Conference football standings
	Conf.			Overall
Team	W		L	W		L
No. 11 Hampton $^	7	–	1	10	–	2
Delaware State	6	–	2	8	–	3
South Carolina State	6	–	2	7	–	4
Florida A&M	5	–	3	7	–	4
Howard	4	–	4	5	–	6
Morgan State	4	–	4	5	–	6
Bethune–Cookman	3	–	5	5	–	6
Norfolk State	1	–	7	4	–	7
North Carolina A&T	0	–	8	0	–	11
$ – Conference champion; ^ – FCS playoff participant; Rankings from The Sports Network poll

The 2006 South Carolina State Bulldogs football team represented South Carolina State University as a member of the Mid-Eastern Athletic Conference (MEAC) during the 2006 NCAA Division I FCS football season. Led by fifth-year head coach Oliver Pough, the Bulldogs compiled an overall record of 7–4, with a mark of 6–2 in conference play, and finished tied for second in the MEAC.

== Schedule ==
Date	Opponent	Site	Result	Attendance	Source
September 2	at Wofford*	Gibbs Stadium; Spartanburg, SC	L 21–28	11,738	
September 9	at Winston-Salem State*	Bowman Gray Stadium; Winston-Salem, NC	W 35–6		
September 16	Bethune–Cookman	Johnson Hagood Stadium; Charleston, SC	L 21–45	15,825	
September 23	at Coastal Carolina*	Brooks Stadium; Conway, SC	L 14–33	9,287	
October 7	Norfolk State	Oliver C. Dawson Stadium; Orangeburg, SC	W 47–10	15,304	
October 14	at Florida A&M	Bragg Memorial Stadium; Tallahassee, FL	W 28–21	10,124	
October 21	No. 11 Hampton	Oliver C. Dawson Stadium; Orangeburg, SC	W 13–6	9,090	
October 28	at Delaware State	Alumni Stadium; Dover, DE	L 9–10	2,512	
November 4	Howard^{†}	Oliver C. Dawson Stadium; Orangeburg, SC	W 28–10	18,155	
November 11	at Morgan State	Hughes Stadium; Baltimore, MD	W 41–16	2,876	
November 18	vs. North Carolina A&T	American Legion Memorial Stadium; Charlotte, NC (rivalry)	W 41–19	10,126	
*Non-conference game; ^{†}Homecoming; Rankings from The Sports Network Poll released prior to the game
