= 2006 Norfolk State Spartans football team =

American college football season

2006 Norfolk State Spartans football
- Conference: Mid-Eastern Athletic Conference
- Record: 4–7 (1–7 MEAC)
- Head coach: Pete Adrian (2nd season)
- Home stadium: William "Dick" Price Stadium

2006 Mid-Eastern Athletic Conference football standings
| | Conf. | | | Overall |
| Team | W | | L | W | | L |
|---|---|---|---|---|---|---|
| No. 11 Hampton $^ | 7 | – | 1 | 10 | – | 2 |
| Delaware State | 6 | – | 2 | 8 | – | 3 |
| South Carolina State | 6 | – | 2 | 7 | – | 4 |
| Florida A&M | 5 | – | 3 | 7 | – | 4 |
| Howard | 4 | – | 4 | 5 | – | 6 |
| Morgan State | 4 | – | 4 | 5 | – | 6 |
| Bethune–Cookman | 3 | – | 5 | 5 | – | 6 |
| Norfolk State | 1 | – | 7 | 4 | – | 7 |
| North Carolina A&T | 0 | – | 8 | 0 | – | 11 |
$ – Conference champion; ^ – FCS playoff participant; Rankings from The Sports Network poll

The 2006 Norfolk State Spartans football team represented Norfolk State University as a member of the Mid-Eastern Athletic Conference (MEAC) during the 2006 NCAA Division I FCS football season. Led by second-year head coach Pete Adrian, the Spartans compiled an overall record of 4–7, with a conference record of 1–7, and finished eighth in the MEAC.

== Schedule ==
| Date | Opponent | Site | Result | Attendance | Source |
|---|---|---|---|---|---|
| September 2 | Virginia State* | William "Dick" Price Stadium; Norfolk, VA | W 29–14 | | |
| September 9 | VMI* | William "Dick" Price Stadium; Norfolk, VA | W 32–19 | 12,609 | |
| September 23 | at Bethune–Cookman | Municipal Stadium; Daytona Beach, FL | L 21–22 | 5,263 | |
| September 30 | North Carolina A&T | William "Dick" Price Stadium; Norfolk, VA | W 42–20 | | |
| October 7 | at South Carolina State | Oliver C. Dawson Stadium; Orangeburg, SC | L 10–47 | 15,304 | |
| October 14 | at No. 12 Hampton | Armstrong Stadium; Hampton, VA | L 13–42 | 18,157 | |
| October 21 | Florida A&M | William "Dick" Price Stadium; Norfolk, VA | L 33–36 ^{OT} | | |
| October 28 | at Howard | William H. Greene Stadium; Washington, DC | L 10–13 | | |
| November 4 | Morgan State | William "Dick" Price Stadium; Norfolk, VA | L 20–29 | 15,501 | |
| November 11 | Delaware State | William "Dick" Price Stadium; Norfolk, VA | L 10–33 | 6,888 | |
| November 18 | Winston-Salem State* | William "Dick" Price Stadium; Norfolk, VA | W 31–14 | 3,902 | |
*Non-conference game; Rankings from The Sports Network Poll released prior to the game
