= 2006 Stony Brook Seawolves football team =

American college football season

2006 Stony Brook Seawolves football
- Conference: Northeast Conference
- Record: 5–6 (5–2 NEC)
- Head coach: Chuck Priore (1st season)
- Offensive coordinator: Jeff Behrman (1st season)
- Home stadium: Kenneth P. LaValle Stadium

2006 Northeast Conference football standings
	Conf.			Overall
Team	W		L	W		L
Monmouth $	6	–	1	10	–	2
Albany	5	–	2	7	–	4
Robert Morris	5	–	2	7	–	4
Stony Brook	5	–	2	5	–	6
Central Connecticut State	4	–	3	8	–	3
Saint Francis (PA)	2	–	5	3	–	8
Sacred Heart	1	–	6	2	–	9
Wagner	0	–	7	4	–	7
$ – Conference champion

The 2006 Stony Brook Seawolves football team represented Stony Brook University as a member of the Northeast Conference (NEC) during the 2006 NCAA Division I FCS football season. Led by first-year head coach Chuck Priore, the Seawolves compiled an overall record of 5–6 with a mark of 5–2 in conference place, placing in a three-way tie for second in the NEC. Stony Brook played home games at Kenneth P. LaValle Stadium in Stony Brook, New York.

== Schedule ==
Date	Time	Opponent	Site	TV	Result	Attendance
August 31	7:00 pm	Hofstra*	Kenneth P. LaValle Stadium; Stony Brook, NY (Battle of Long Island)	FSNY	L 8–17	5,626
September 9	1:00 pm	at Georgetown*	Multi-Sport Field; Washington, DC		L 0–7	1,950
September 16	12:00 pm	at No. 1 New Hampshire*	Cowell Stadium; Durham, NH		L 7–62	7,395
September 23	1:00 pm	at No. 9 UMass*	Warren McGuirk Alumni Stadium; Hadley, MA		L 7–48	9,001
September 30	1:00 pm	at Monmouth	Kessler Field; West Long Branch, NJ		W 36–17	2,531
October 7	2:00 pm	Albany^{†}	Kenneth P. LaValle Stadium; Stony Brook, NY (rivalry)		W 33–21	6,688
October 14	1:00 pm	at St. Francis (PA)	DeGol Field; Loretto, PA		W 30–20	716
October 21	1:00pm	Sacred Heart	Kenneth P. LaValle Stadium; Stony Brook, NY		W 38–21	3,136
October 28	1:00 pm	Robert Morris	Kenneth P. LaValle Stadium; Stony Brook, NY		L 6–21	1,893
November 4	1:00 pm	at Wagner	Wagner College Stadium; Staten Island, NY		W 45–9	2,417
November 11	12:00 pm	at Central Connecticut	Arute Field; New Britain, CT		L 32–35	2,587
*Non-conference game; ^{†}Homecoming; Rankings from The Sports Network Poll released prior to the game; All times are in Eastern time
