= 2006 Morgan State Bears football team =

American college football season

2006 Morgan State Bears football
- Conference: Mid-Eastern Athletic Conference
- Record: 5–6 (4–4 MEAC)
- Head coach: Donald Hill-Eley (5th season)
- Home stadium: Hughes Stadium

2006 Mid-Eastern Athletic Conference football standings
	Conf.			Overall
Team	W		L	W		L
No. 11 Hampton $^	7	–	1	10	–	2
Delaware State	6	–	2	8	–	3
South Carolina State	6	–	2	7	–	4
Florida A&M	5	–	3	7	–	4
Howard	4	–	4	5	–	6
Morgan State	4	–	4	5	–	6
Bethune–Cookman	3	–	5	5	–	6
Norfolk State	1	–	7	4	–	7
North Carolina A&T	0	–	8	0	–	11
$ – Conference champion; ^ – FCS playoff participant; Rankings from The Sports Network poll

The 2006 Morgan State Bears football team represented Morgan State University as a member of the Mid-Eastern Athletic Conference (MEAC) during the 2006 NCAA Division I FCS football season. Led by fifth-year head coach Donald Hill-Eley, the Bears compiled an overall record of 5–6, with a mark of 4–4 in conference play, and finished tied for fifth in the MEAC.

== Schedule ==
Date	Opponent	Site	Result	Attendance	Source
September 2	at Towson*	Johnny Unitas Stadium; Towson, MD (rivalry)	L 2–30	4,484	
September 9	at Monmouth*	Kessler Field; West Long Branch, NJ	L 9–26	3,215	
September 16	Bowie State*	Hughes Stadium; Baltimore, MD	W 28–20	9,504	
September 23	vs. No. 11 Hampton	Giants Stadium; East Rutherford, NJ (Urban League Classic)	L 7–26	53,588	
September 30	Bethune–Cookman	Hughes Stadium; Baltimore, MD	W 28–14		
October 7	at North Carolina A&T	Aggie Stadium; Greensboro, NC	W 32–0	4,264	
October 14	at Howard	William H. Greene Stadium; Washington, DC (rivalry)	W 18–12 ^{2OT}	7,035	
October 21	Delaware State	Hughes Stadium; Baltimore, MD	L 7–29	13,557	
October 28	at Florida A&M	Bragg Memorial Stadium; Tallahassee, FL	L 23–24	26,190	
November 4	at Norfolk State	William "Dick" Price Stadium; Norfolk, VA	W 29–20	15,501	
November 11	South Carolina State	Hughes Stadium; Baltimore, MD	L 16–41	2,876	
*Non-conference game; Rankings from The Sports Network Poll released prior to the game
