= 2006 Tennessee–Martin Skyhawks football team =

American college football season

2006 Tennessee–Martin Skyhawks football

OVC champion

NCAA Division I First Round, L 30–36 vs. Southern Illinois
- Conference: Ohio Valley Conference

Ranking
- Sports Network: No. 13
- Record: 9–3 (6–1 OVC)
- Head coach: Jason Simpson (1st season)
- Home stadium: Graham Stadium

2006 Ohio Valley Conference football standings
	Conf.			Overall
Team	W		L	W		L
No. 15 Eastern Illinois +^	7	–	1	8	–	5
No. 13 Tennessee–Martin +^	6	–	1	9	–	3
Tennessee State	5	–	2	6	–	5
Jacksonville State	5	–	3	6	–	5
Eastern Kentucky	5	–	3	6	–	5
Tennessee Tech	4	–	4	4	–	7
Southeast Missouri State	2	–	6	4	–	7
Samford	1	–	7	3	–	8
Murray State	0	–	8	1	–	10
+ – Conference co-champions; ^ – FCS playoff participant; Rankings from The Sports Network poll

The 2006 Tennessee–Martin Skyhawks football team represented the University of Tennessee at Martin in the 2006 NCAA Division I FCS football season. The team was led by first-year head coach Jason Simpson and played their home games at Graham Stadium in Martin, Tennessee. The Skyhawks finished the season with a 9–3 overall record and a 6–1 record in Ohio Valley Conference games, tying them with Eastern Illinois for the conference championship. They qualified for the NCAA Division I FCS playoffs, where they lost to Southern Illinois in the first round. Tennessee–Martin was ranked No. 13 in The Sports Network's postseason NCAA Division I FCS ranking.

== Schedule ==
Date	Opponent	Rank	Site	Result	Attendance	Source
September 2	at Ohio*		Peden Stadium; Athens, OH	L 3–29	15,010	
September 7	Urbana*		Graham Stadium; Martin, TN	W 28–0	3,791	
September 16	Gardner–Webb*		Graham Stadium; Martin, TN	W 35–9	2,004	
September 23	No. 25 Jacksonville State		Graham Stadium; Martin, TN	W 24–14	2,017	
September 30	at Austin Peay*		Governors Stadium; Clarksville, TN	W 20–10	6,127	
October 5	at Tennessee Tech	No. 22	Tucker Stadium; Cookeville, TN	W 35–16	2,891	
October 21	at Samford	No. 16	Seibert Stadium; Homewood, AL	W 10–6	5,840	
October 28	No. 14 Eastern Illinois^{†}	No. 12	Graham Stadium; Martin, TN	W 15–9	6,935	
November 4	at Southeast Missouri State	No. 10	Houck Stadium; Cape Girardeau, MO	W 28–14	4,125	
November 11	Eastern Kentucky	No. 8	Graham Stadium; Martin, TN	L 28–31	5,843	
November 18	at Murray State	No. 12	Roy Stewart Stadium; Murray, KY	W 42–14	2,426	
November 25	at No. 10 Southern Illinois*	No. 12	McAndrew Stadium; Carbondale, IL (NCAA Division I First Round)	L 30–36	5,694	
*Non-conference game; ^{†}Homecoming; Rankings from The Sports Network Poll released prior to the game
