= Jason Simpson =

American football coach (born 1971)

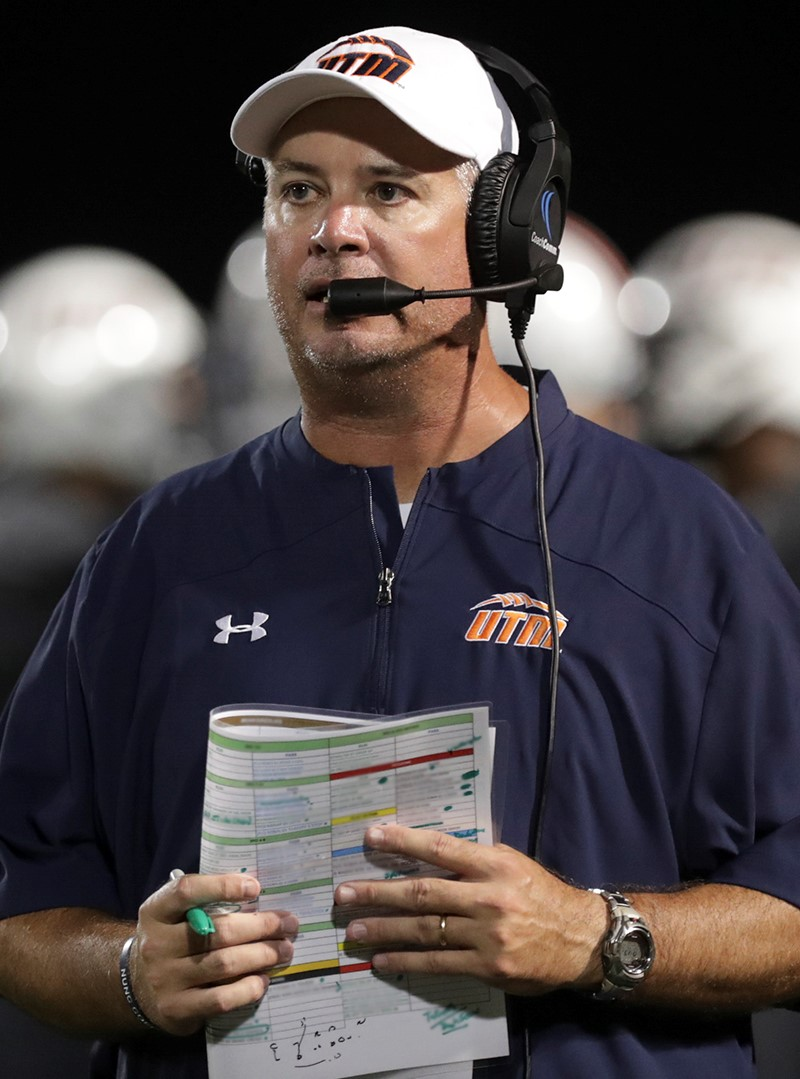
- Simpson in 2020

Current position
- Title: Head coach
- Team: UT Martin
- Conference: OVC–Big South
- Record: 129–96

Biographical details
- Born: January 25, 1971 (age 55); Ellisville, Mississippi, U.S.

Playing career

Football
- 1990–1992: Mississippi State

Baseball
- 1993–1994: Southern Miss
- Positions: Quarterback (football); Outfielder (baseball)

Coaching career (HC unless noted)
- 1995: Delta State (GA)
- 1996: Collins HS (MS) (assistant)
- 1997–1999: Jacksonville State (QB)
- 2000–2002: Southwest Texas State (QB/WR)
- 2003–2005: Chattanooga (OC)
- 2006–present: Tennessee–Martin / UT Martin

Head coaching record
- Overall: 129–96
- Tournaments: 1–2 (NCAA D-I playoffs)

Accomplishments and honors

Championships
- 3 OVC (2006, 2021–2022); 2 Big South–OVC (2023–2024)

Awards
- 2× OVC Coach of the Year (2006, 2021)

Jason Edwin Simpson (born January 25, 1971) is an American football coach who serves as the head football coach for the UT Martin Skyhawks.

== Career ==
He is the head football coach at the University of Tennessee at Martin, a position he has held since 2006. He has led the UT Martin Skyhawks to five Ohio Valley Conference championships, in 2006, 2021, 2022, 2023, and 2024.

== Personal life ==
He is the father of Ty Simpson, who was a college football quarterback for the Alabama Crimson Tide. Ty Simpson now plays for the Los Angeles Rams after being drafted 13th in the 2026 NFL draft. Simpson also has another son, Graham Simpson, who is a high school quarterback for Westview High School in Martin, Tennessee.

== Head coaching record ==
Year	Team	Overall	Conference	Standing	Bowl/playoffs	TSN/STATS^{#}	Coaches^{°}
Tennessee–Martin / UT Martin Skyhawks (Ohio Valley Conference) (2006–2022)
2006	Tennessee–Martin	9–3	6–1	T–1st	L NCAA Division I First Round	13	
2007	Tennessee–Martin	4–7	4–4	6th			
2008	Tennessee–Martin	8–4	6–2	T–2nd			
2009	UT Martin	5–6	4–4	4th			
2010	UT Martin	6–5	5–3	T–5th			
2011	UT Martin	5–6	4–4	T–5th			
2012	UT Martin	8–3	6–2	T–2nd			
2013	UT Martin	7–5	5–3	T–3rd			
2014	UT Martin	6–6	5–3	T–3rd			
2015	UT Martin	7–4	6–2	3rd			
2016	UT Martin	7–5	6–2	2nd			
2017	UT Martin	6–5	4–4	4th			
2018	UT Martin	2–9	2–6	8th			
2019	UT Martin	7–5	6–2	3rd			
2020–21	UT Martin	3–4	3–4	5th			
2021	UT Martin	10–3	5–1	1st	L NCAA Division I Second Round	13	12
2022	UT Martin	7–4	5–0	T–1st			
UT Martin Skyhawks (Big South–OVC Football Association) (2023–present)
2023	UT Martin	8–3	5–1	T–1st		25	21
2024	UT Martin	9–5	6–2	T–1st	L NCAA Division I Second Round	17	18
2025	UT Martin	6–6	6–2	2nd			
Tennessee–Martin / UT Martin:		129–96	98–51				
Total:		129–96					
National championship Conference title Conference division title or championship game berth
