= 2006 Robert Morris Colonials football team =

American college football season

2006 Robert Morris Colonials football
- Conference: Northeast Conference
- Record: 7–4 (5–2 NEC)
- Head coach: Joe Walton (13th season)
- Defensive coordinator: Dan Radakovich (12th season)
- Home stadium: Joe Walton Stadium

2006 Northeast Conference football standings
	Conf.			Overall
Team	W		L	W		L
Monmouth $	6	–	1	10	–	2
Albany	5	–	2	7	–	4
Robert Morris	5	–	2	7	–	4
Stony Brook	5	–	2	5	–	6
Central Connecticut State	4	–	3	8	–	3
Saint Francis (PA)	2	–	5	3	–	8
Sacred Heart	1	–	6	2	–	9
Wagner	0	–	7	4	–	7
$ – Conference champion

The 2006 Robert Morris Colonials football team represented Robert Morris University in the 2006 NCAA Division I FCS football season. The Colonials were led by 13th-year head coach Joe Walton and played their home games at Joe Walton Stadium. They were a member of the Northeast Conference.

== Schedule ==
Date	Opponent	Site	Result	Attendance
September 2	at Dayton*	Welcome Stadium; Dayton, OH	L 14–21	3,719
September 9	Duquesne*	Joe Walton Stadium; Moon Township, PA	L 7–27	3,246
September 16	at Butler*	Butler Bowl; Indianapolis, IN	W 35–14	1,536
September 23	Rowan*	Joe Walton Stadium; Moon Township, PA	W 21–0	1,642
September 30	at Saint Francis	DeGol Field; Loretto, PA	W 45–13	1,394
October 7	at Wagner	Wagner College Stadium; Staten Island, NY	W 14–10	3,204
October 14	No. 19 Central Connecticut State	Joe Walton Stadium; Moon Township, PA	W 23–17 ^{2OT}	2,843
October 21	Monmouth	Joe Walton Stadium; Moon Township, PA	L 7–16	2,143
October 28	at Stony Brook	LaValle Stadium; Stony Brook, NY	W 21–6	1,893
November 4	Albany	Joe Walton Stadium; Moon Township, PA	L 6–16	2,148
November 11	at Sacred Heart	Campus Field; Fairfield, CT	W 41–21	1,836
*Non-conference game; Rankings from The Sports Network Poll released prior to the game
