= 2006 North Carolina A&T Aggies football team =

American college football season

2006 North Carolina A&T Aggies football
- Conference: Mid-Eastern Athletic Conference
- Record: 0–11 (0–8 MEAC)
- Head coach: Lee Fobbs (1st season)
- Home stadium: Aggie Stadium

2006 Mid-Eastern Athletic Conference football standings
	Conf.			Overall
Team	W		L	W		L
No. 11 Hampton $^	7	–	1	10	–	2
Delaware State	6	–	2	8	–	3
South Carolina State	6	–	2	7	–	4
Florida A&M	5	–	3	7	–	4
Howard	4	–	4	5	–	6
Morgan State	4	–	4	5	–	6
Bethune–Cookman	3	–	5	5	–	6
Norfolk State	1	–	7	4	–	7
North Carolina A&T	0	–	8	0	–	11
$ – Conference champion; ^ – FCS playoff participant; Rankings from The Sports Network poll

The 2006 North Carolina A&T Aggies football team represented North Carolina A&T State University as a member of the Mid-Eastern Athletic Conference (MEAC) during the 2006 NCAA Division I FCS football season. Led by first-year head coach Lee Fobbs, the Aggies compiled an overall record of 0–11, with a mark of 0–8 in conference play, and finished ninth in the MEAC.

== Schedule ==
Date	Opponent	Site	Result	Attendance	Source
September 2	Winston-Salem State*	Aggie Stadium; Greensboro, NC (rivalry)	L 14–41	21,005	
September 16	at No. 10 Hampton	Armstrong Stadium; Hampton, VA	L 14–48	5,180	
September 23	at Louisiana–Lafayette*	Cajun Field; Lafayette, LA	L 7–48	15,041	
September 30	at Norfolk State	William "Dick" Price Stadium; Norfolk, VA	L 20–42		
October 7	Morgan State	Aggie Stadium; Greensboro, NC	L 0–32	4,264	
October 14	at Delaware State	Alumni Stadium; Dover, DE	L 21–37	4,577	
October 21	Howard	Aggie Stadium; Greensboro, NC	L 0–26	21,500	
October 26	at Bethune–Cookman	Municipal Stadium; Daytona Beach, FL	L 7–70	7,842	
November 4	Florida A&M	Aggie Stadium; Greensboro, NC	L 12–45	8,442	
November 11	Elon*	Aggie Stadium; Greensboro, NC	L 0–45	2,768	
November 18	vs. South Carolina State	American Legion Memorial Stadium; Charlotte, NC (rivalry)	L 19–41	10,126	
*Non-conference game; Rankings from The Sports Network Poll released prior to the game
