= 2006 Monmouth Hawks football team =

American college football season

2006 Monmouth Hawks football

NEC champion

Gridiron Classic, L 7–27 vs San Diego
- Conference: Northeast Conference
- Record: 10–2 (6–1 NEC)
- Head coach: Kevin Callahan (14th season)
- Offensive coordinator: Mark Fabish (5th season)
- Offensive scheme: Pro-style
- Defensive coordinator: Andy Bobik (13th season)
- Base defense: 4–3
- Home stadium: Kessler Field

2006 Northeast Conference football standings
	Conf.			Overall
Team	W		L	W		L
Monmouth $	6	–	1	10	–	2
Albany	5	–	2	7	–	4
Robert Morris	5	–	2	7	–	4
Stony Brook	5	–	2	5	–	6
Central Connecticut State	4	–	3	8	–	3
Saint Francis (PA)	2	–	5	3	–	8
Sacred Heart	1	–	6	2	–	9
Wagner	0	–	7	4	–	7
$ – Conference champion

The 2006 Monmouth Hawks football team represented Monmouth University in the 2006 NCAA Division I FCS football season as a member of the Northeast Conference (NEC). The Hawks were led by 14th-year head coach Kevin Callahan and played their home games at Kessler Field. They finished the season 10–2 overall and 6–1 in NEC play to win the conference championship. As the team with the best record in the NEC, they were invited to participate in the Gridiron Classic, which they lost 27–7 to San Diego.

== Schedule ==
Date	Time	Opponent	Site	Result	Attendance	Source
September 2	6:00 p.m.	at Fordham*	Coffey Field; Bronx, NY	W 23–9	1,721	
September 9	1:00 p.m.	Morgan State*	Kessler Field; West Long Branch, NJ	W 26–9	3,215	
September 16	1:00 p.m.	Saint Peter's*	Kessler Field; West Long Branch, NJ	W 36–12	2,079	
September 23	1:00 p.m.	at Colgate*	Andy Kerr Stadium; Hamilton, NY	W 17–12	3,512	
September 30	1:00 p.m.	Stony Brook	Kessler Field; West Long Branch, NJ	L 17–36	2,531	
October 7	1:00 p.m.	Sacred Heart	Kessler Field; West Long Branch, NJ	W 24–0	2,137	
October 14	1:00 p.m.	at Wagner	Wagner College Stadium; Staten Island, NY	W 28–7	3,311	
October 21	1:00 p.m.	at Robert Morris	Joe Walton Stadium; Moon Township, PA	W 16–7	2,143	
October 28	1:00 p.m.	Central Connecticut State	Kessler Field; West Long Branch, NJ	W 19–13	3,025	
November 4	1:00 p.m.	Saint Francis (PA)	Kessler Field; West Long Branch, NJ	W 54–20	3,817	
November 11	1:00 p.m.	at Albany	University Field; Albany, NY	W 19–0	1,359	
December 2	12:00 p.m.	No. 16 San Diego*	Kessler Field; West Long Branch, NJ (Gridiron Classic)	L 7–27	4,032	
*Non-conference game; Rankings from The Sports Network Poll released prior to the game; All times are in Eastern time
