= 2006 Bethune–Cookman Wildcats football team =

American college football season

2006 Bethune–Cookman Wildcats football
- Conference: Mid-Eastern Athletic Conference
- Record: 5–6 (3–5 MEAC)
- Head coach: Alvin Wyatt (10th season)
- Home stadium: Municipal Stadium

2006 Mid-Eastern Athletic Conference football standings
	Conf.			Overall
Team	W		L	W		L
No. 11 Hampton $^	7	–	1	10	–	2
Delaware State	6	–	2	8	–	3
South Carolina State	6	–	2	7	–	4
Florida A&M	5	–	3	7	–	4
Howard	4	–	4	5	–	6
Morgan State	4	–	4	5	–	6
Bethune–Cookman	3	–	5	5	–	6
Norfolk State	1	–	7	4	–	7
North Carolina A&T	0	–	8	0	–	11
$ – Conference champion; ^ – FCS playoff participant; Rankings from The Sports Network poll

The 2006 Bethune–Cookman Wildcats football team represented Bethune–Cookman College (now known as Bethune–Cookman University) as a member of the Mid-Eastern Athletic Conference (MEAC) during the 2006 NCAA Division I FCS football season. Led by 10th-year head coach Alvin Wyatt, the Wildcats compiled an overall record of 5–6, with a mark of 3–5 in conference play, and finished seventh in the MEAC.

== Schedule ==
Date	Opponent	Site	Result	Attendance	Source
September 2	vs. Southern*	Alltel Stadium; Jacksonville, FL (Gateway Classic)	L 29–30	23,241	
September 9	Savannah State*	Municipal Stadium; Daytona Beach, FL	W 55–6	6,875	
September 16	at South Carolina State	Johnson Hagood Stadium; Charleston, SC	W 45–21	15,825	
September 23	Norfolk State	Municipal Stadium; Daytona Beach, FL	W 22–21	5,263	
September 30	at Morgan State	Hughes Stadium; Baltimore, MD	L 14–28		
October 7	Delaware State	Municipal Stadium; Daytona Beach, FL	L 31–33	5,241	
October 14	Winston-Salem State*^{†}	Municipal Stadium; Daytona Beach, FL	W 10–6	14,486	
October 26	North Carolina A&T	Municipal Stadium; Daytona Beach, FL	W 70–7	7,842	
November 3	at No. 13 Hampton	Armstrong Stadium; Hampton, VA	L 17–34	4,129	
November 11	Howard	Municipal Stadium; Daytona Beach, FL	L 0–28	5,425	
November 18	vs. Florida A&M	Florida Citrus Bowl; Orlando, FL (Florida Classic)	L 21–35	71,216	
*Non-conference game; ^{†}Homecoming; Rankings from The Sports Network Poll released prior to the game
