= 2006 Davidson Wildcats football team =

American college football season

2006 Davidson Wildcats football
- Conference: Pioneer Football League
- Record: 6–4 (5–2 PFL)
- Head coach: Tripp Merritt (2nd season)
- Home stadium: Richardson Stadium

2006 Pioneer Football League standings
	Conf.			Overall
Team	W		L	W		L
No. 20 San Diego $	7	–	0	11	–	1
Drake	6	–	1	9	–	2
Davidson	5	–	2	6	–	4
Jacksonville	4	–	3	4	–	6
Butler	2	–	5	3	–	8
Morehead State	2	–	5	2	–	9
Dayton	1	–	6	4	–	6
Valparaiso	1	–	6	3	–	8
$ – Conference champion; ^ – FCS playoff participant; Rankings from The Sports Network poll

The 2006 Davidson Wildcats football team represented Davidson College as a member of the Pioneer Football League (PFL) during the 2006 NCAA Division I FCS football season. Led by second-year head coach Tripp Merritt, the Wildcats compiled an overall record of 6–4 with a mark of 5–2 in conference play, placing third in the PFL. The team played home games at Richardson Stadium in Davidson, North Carolina.

== Schedule ==
Date	Time	Opponent	Site	Result	Attendance	Source
September 2	1:00 p.m.	at VMI*	Alumni Memorial Stadium; Lexington, VA	L 19–20	8,112	
September 9	7:00 p.m.	Wingate*	Richardson Stadium; Davidson, NC	L 16–22 ^{OT}	4,316	
September 16	7:00 p.m.	at Lenoir–Rhyne*	Moretz Stadium; Hickory, NC	W 24–14	7,106	
September 30	7:00 p.m.	San Diego	Richardson Stadium; Davidson, NC	L 21–50	3,189	
October 7	1:00 p.m.	Jacksonville	Richardson Stadium; Davidson, NC	W 38-3	2,272	
October 14	1:00 p.m.	at Morehead State	Jayne Stadium; Morehead, KY	W 27–24	7,756	
October 21	1:00 p.m.	Dayton	Richardson Stadium; Davidson, NC	W 37–36	3,654	
October 28	1:00 p.m.	at Valparaiso	Brown Field; Valparaiso, IN	W 48–14	1,067	
November 4	2:00 p.m.	at Drake	Drake Stadium; Des Moines, IA	L 15–35	3,368	
November 11	1:00 p.m.	Butler	Richardson Stadium; Davidson, NC	W 50–10	3,897	
*Non-conference game; All times are in Eastern time
