= 2006 Weber State Wildcats football team =

American college football season

2006 Weber State Wildcats football
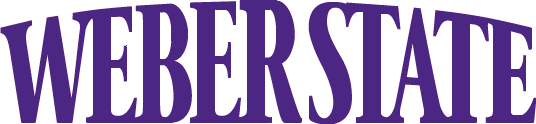
- Conference: Big Sky Conference
- Record: 4–7 (3–5 Big Sky)
- Head coach: Ron McBride (2nd season)
- Offensive coordinator: Kevin McGiven (1st season)
- Home stadium: Stewart Stadium

2006 Big Sky Conference football standings
	Conf.			Overall
Team	W		L	W		L
No. 3 Montana $^	8	–	0	12	–	2
No. 10 Montana State ^	6	–	2	8	–	5
No. 19 Portland State	6	–	2	7	–	4
Northern Arizona	5	–	3	6	–	5
Sacramento State	4	–	4	4	–	7
Weber State	3	–	5	4	–	7
Eastern Washington	3	–	5	3	–	8
Idaho State	1	–	7	2	–	9
Northern Colorado	0	–	8	1	–	10
$ – Conference champion; ^ – FCS playoff participant; Rankings from The Sports Network poll

The 2006 Weber State Wildcats football team represented Weber State University as a member of the Big Sky Conference during the 2006 NCAA Division I FCS football season. Led by second-year head coach Ron McBride, the Wildcats compiled an overall record of 4–7 with a mark of 3–5 in conference play to finish in a tie for 6th place.

== Schedule ==
Date	Time	Opponent	Site	TV	Result	Attendance	Source
September 2	3:00 pm	at Colorado State*	Hughes Stadium; Fort Collins, CO		L 6–30	28,801	
September 9	7:00 pm	No. 5 Cal Poly*	Stewart Stadium; Ogden, UT		L 0–17	8,519	
September 16	7:00 pm	Southern Utah*	Stewart Stadium; Ogden, UT (Beehive Bowl)		W 24–13	6,447	
September 23	6:00 pm	No. 15 Portland State	Stewart Stadium; Ogden, UT		L 10–20	6,967	
September 28	6:30 pm	Northern Colorado	Stewart Stadium; Ogden, UT		W 26–21	5,115	
October 7	7:05 pm	at Sacramento State	Hornet Stadium; Sacramento, CA		L 21–24	7,184	
October 21	1:00 pm	No. 2 Montana	Stewart Stadium; Ogden, UT	KPAX	L 30–33	5,424	
October 28	1:35 pm	at No. 24 Montana State	Bobcat Stadium; Bozeman, MT		L 18–24	10,127	
November 4	1:00 pm	Eastern Washington	Stewart Stadium; Ogden, UT		W 19–14	3,504	
November 11	3:05 pm	at Northern Arizona	Walkup Skydome; Flagstaff, AZ		L 17–41	4,811	
November 18	3:05 pm	at Idaho State	Holt Arena; Pocatello, ID		W 30–27	6,744	
*Non-conference game; Rankings from The Sports Network Poll released prior to the game; All times are in Mountain time
