= 2006 Drake Bulldogs football team =

American college football season

2006 Drake Bulldogs football
- Conference: Pioneer Football League
- Record: 9–2 (6–1 PFL)
- Head coach: Rob Ash (14th season)
- Home stadium: Drake Stadium

2006 Pioneer Football League standings
	Conf.			Overall
Team	W		L	W		L
No. 20 San Diego $	7	–	0	11	–	1
Drake	6	–	1	9	–	2
Davidson	5	–	2	6	–	4
Jacksonville	4	–	3	4	–	6
Butler	2	–	5	3	–	8
Morehead State	2	–	5	2	–	9
Dayton	1	–	6	4	–	6
Valparaiso	1	–	6	3	–	8
$ – Conference champion; ^ – FCS playoff participant; Rankings from The Sports Network poll

The 2006 Drake Bulldogs football team represented Drake University as a member of the Pioneer Football League (PFL) during the 2006 NCAA Division I FCS football season. Led by 14th-year head coach Rob Ash, the Bulldogs compiled an overall record of 9–2 with a mark of 6–1 in conference play, placing second in the PFL. The team played its home games at Drake Stadium in Des Moines, Iowa.

The Bulldogs were chosen as a 2006 Sports Network Cup finalist, finishing second to PFL champion San Diego in first-place votes and third in overall votes.

== Schedule ==
Date	Time	Opponent	Site	TV	Result	Attendance	Source
August 31	7:00 p.m.	No. 4 Northern Iowa*	Drake Stadium; Des Moines, IA (Scheels Kickoff Classic, rivalry)	KFXA/KDSM	L 7–48	10,107	
September 9	1:00 p.m.	Upper Iowa*	Drake Stadium; Des Moines, IA		W 40–7	2,511	
September 16	1:00 p.m.	Wisconsin–Platteville*	Drake Stadium; Des Moines, IA		W 35–7	3,613	
September 23	12:00 p.m.	at Valparaiso	Brown Field; Valparaiso, IN		W 21–7	2,374	
September 30	1:00 p.m.	Morehead State^{†}	Drake Stadium; Des Moines, IA		W 33–7	3,234	
October 7	1:00 p.m.	Waldorf*	Drake Stadium; Des Moines, IA		W 35–3	2,103	
October 14	12:00 p.m.	at Butler	Butler Bowl; Indianapolis, IN		W 29–0	921	
October 21	1:00 p.m.	No. 20 San Diego	Drake Stadium; Des Moines, IA		L 0–37	5,263	
October 28	12:00 p.m.	at Dayton	Welcome Stadium; Dayton, OH (rivalry)		W 21–9	3,863	
November 4	1:00 p.m.	Davidson	Drake Stadium; Des Moines, IA		W 35–15	3,368	
November 11	12:00 p.m.	at Jacksonville	D. B. Milne Field; Jacksonville, FL		W 47–28	1,245	
*Non-conference game; ^{†}Homecoming; Rankings from The Sports Network Poll released prior to the game; All times are in Central time
