= 2006 Eastern Washington Eagles football team =

American college football season

2006 Eastern Washington Eagles football
- Conference: Big Sky Conference
- Record: 3–8 (3–5 Big Sky)
- Head coach: Paul Wulff (7th season)
- Offensive coordinator: Beau Baldwin (4th season)
- Defensive coordinator: Jody Sears (4th season)
- Home stadium: Woodward Field

2006 Big Sky Conference football standings
	Conf.			Overall
Team	W		L	W		L
No. 3 Montana $^	8	–	0	12	–	2
No. 10 Montana State ^	6	–	2	8	–	5
No. 19 Portland State	6	–	2	7	–	4
Northern Arizona	5	–	3	6	–	5
Sacramento State	4	–	4	4	–	7
Weber State	3	–	5	4	–	7
Eastern Washington	3	–	5	3	–	8
Idaho State	1	–	7	2	–	9
Northern Colorado	0	–	8	1	–	10
$ – Conference champion; ^ – FCS playoff participant; Rankings from The Sports Network poll

The 2006 Eastern Washington Eagles football team represented Eastern Washington University as a member of the Big Sky Conference during the 2006 NCAA Division I FCS football season. Led by seventh-year head coach Paul Wulff, the Eagles compiled an overall record of 3–8, with a mark of 3–5 in conference play, and finished tied for sixth in the Big Sky. The team played home games at Woodward Field in Cheney, Washington.

== Schedule ==
Date	Opponent	Site	Result	Attendance	Source
August 31	at Oregon State*	Reser Stadium; Corvallis, OR	L 17–56	38,071	
September 9	at No. 6 (FBS) West Virginia*	Mountaineer Field; Morgantown, WV	L 3–52	59,504	
September 16	Central Washington*	Woodward Field; Cheney, WA	L 14–21	7,943	
September 23	at Montana State	Bobcat Stadium; Bozeman, MT	W 19–10	12,847	
September 30	Sacramento State	Woodward Field; Cheney, WA	L 20–21	6,738	
October 7	No. 4 Montana	Woodward Field; Cheney, WA (EWU–UM Governors Cup)	L 17–33	11,583	
October 14	at Northern Colorado	Nottingham Field; Greeley, CO	W 34–0	6,012	
October 21	at No. 23 Portland State	PGE Park; Portland, OR (rivalry)	L 0–34	6,541	
October 28	Northern Arizona	Woodward Field; Cheney, WA	L 26–34	5,498	
November 4	at Weber State	Stewart Stadium; Ogden, UT	L 14–19	3,504	
November 11	Idaho State	Woodward Field; Cheney, WA	W 40–6	3,818	
*Non-conference game; Rankings from The Sports Network Poll released prior to the game
