= 2006 Jacksonville Dolphins football team =

American college football team

2006 Jacksonville Dolphins football
- Conference: Pioneer Football League
- Record: 4–6 (4–3 PFL)
- Head coach: Steve Gilbert (9th season)
- Home stadium: D. B. Milne Field

2006 Pioneer Football League standings
	Conf.			Overall
Team	W		L	W		L
No. 20 San Diego $	7	–	0	11	–	1
Drake	6	–	1	9	–	2
Davidson	5	–	2	6	–	4
Jacksonville	4	–	3	4	–	6
Butler	2	–	5	3	–	8
Morehead State	2	–	5	2	–	9
Dayton	1	–	6	4	–	6
Valparaiso	1	–	6	3	–	8
$ – Conference champion; ^ – FCS playoff participant; Rankings from The Sports Network poll

The 2006 Jacksonville Dolphins football team represented Jacksonville University as a member of the South Division of the Pioneer Football League (PFL) during the 2006 NCAA Division I FCS football season. Led by ninth-year head coach Steve Gilbert, the Dolphins compiled an overall record of 4–6 with a mark of 4–3 conference play, and placed fourth in the PFL. Jacksonville played home games at D. B. Milne Field in Jacksonville, Florida.

== Schedule ==
Date	Time	Opponent	Site	Result	Attendance	Source
September 2	12:30 p.m.	Gardner–Webb*	D. B. Milne Field; Jacksonville, FL	L 14–49	2,365	
September 16	7:00 p.m.	at Southeastern Louisiana*	Strawberry Stadium; Hammond, LA	L 13–41	6,677	
September 23		at Butler	Butler Bowl; Indianapolis, IN	W 31–7	611	
September 30		at Valparaiso	Brown Field; Valparaiso, IN	W 34–17	31,08	
October 7	1:00 p.m.	at Davidson	Richardson Stadium; Davidson, NC	L 3–38	2,272	
October 14		Dayton	D. B. Milne Field; Jacksonville, FL	W 28–21	3,127	
October 21		at Morehead State	Jayne Stadium; Morehead, KY	W 28–24	4,012	
October 28		at North Greenville*	Younts Stadium; Tigerville, SC	L 6–41	2,000	
November 4		No. 16 San Diego	D. B. Milne Field; Jacksonville, FL	L 21–38	3,246	
November 11	1:00 p.m.	Drake	D. B. Milne Field; Jacksonville, FL	L 28–47	1,245	
*Non-conference game; Rankings from The Sports Network Poll released prior to the game; All times are in Eastern time
