= 2006 Florida A&M Rattlers football team =

American college football season

2006 Florida A&M Rattlers football
- Conference: Mid-Eastern Athletic Conference
- Record: 7–4 (5–3 MEAC)
- Head coach: Rubin Carter (2nd season)
- Home stadium: Bragg Memorial Stadium

2006 Mid-Eastern Athletic Conference football standings
	Conf.			Overall
Team	W		L	W		L
No. 11 Hampton $^	7	–	1	10	–	2
Delaware State	6	–	2	8	–	3
South Carolina State	6	–	2	7	–	4
Florida A&M	5	–	3	7	–	4
Howard	4	–	4	5	–	6
Morgan State	4	–	4	5	–	6
Bethune–Cookman	3	–	5	5	–	6
Norfolk State	1	–	7	4	–	7
North Carolina A&T	0	–	8	0	–	11
$ – Conference champion; ^ – FCS playoff participant; Rankings from The Sports Network poll

The 2006 Florida A&M Rattlers football team represented Florida A&M University as a member of the Mid-Eastern Athletic Conference (MEAC) during the 2006 NCAA Division I FCS football season. Led by second-year head coach Rubin Carter, the Rattlers compiled an overall record of 7–4, with a mark of 5–3 in conference play, and finished fourth in the MEAC.

== Schedule ==
Date	Opponent	Site	Result	Attendance	Source
September 2	vs. Delaware State	Ford Field; Detroit, MI (Detroit Football Classic)	L 14–34	29,713	
September 9	at No. 17 (FBS) Miami (FL)*	Miami Orange Bowl; Miami, FL	L 10–51	40,208	
September 16	at Howard	William H. Greene Stadium; Washington, DC	W 31–23	6,035	
September 23	Winston-Salem State*	Bragg Memorial Stadium; Tallahassee, FL	W 25–21	13,627	
September 30	vs. Tennessee State*	Georgia Dome; Atlanta, GA (Atlanta Football Classic)	W 25–22	57,885	
October 14	South Carolina State	Bragg Memorial Stadium; Tallahassee, FL	L 21–28	10,124	
October 21	at Norfolk State	William "Dick" Price Stadium; Norfolk, VA	W 36–33 ^{OT}		
October 28	Morgan State^{†}	Bragg Memorial Stadium; Tallahassee, FL	W 24–23	26,190	
November 4	at North Carolina A&T	Aggie Stadium; Greensboro, NC	W 45–12	8,442	
November 11	No. 11 Hampton	Bragg Memorial Stadium; Tallahassee, FL	L 7–59	13,722	
November 18	vs. Bethune–Cookman	Florida Citrus Bowl; Orlando, FL (Florida Classic)	W 35–21	71,216	
*Non-conference game; ^{†}Homecoming; Rankings from The Sports Network Poll released prior to the game
