= 2006 Samford Bulldogs football team =

American college football season

2006 Samford Bulldogs football
- Conference: Ohio Valley Conference
- Record: 3–8 (1–7 OVC)
- Head coach: Bill Gray (6th season)
- Offensive coordinator: Bill Gray (6th season)
- Defensive coordinator: Mike O'Toole (7th season)
- Home stadium: Seibert Stadium

2006 Ohio Valley Conference football standings
	Conf.			Overall
Team	W		L	W		L
No. 15 Eastern Illinois +^	7	–	1	8	–	5
No. 13 Tennessee–Martin +^	6	–	1	9	–	3
Tennessee State	5	–	2	6	–	5
Jacksonville State	5	–	3	6	–	5
Eastern Kentucky	5	–	3	6	–	5
Tennessee Tech	4	–	4	4	–	7
Southeast Missouri State	2	–	6	4	–	7
Samford	1	–	7	3	–	8
Murray State	0	–	8	1	–	10
+ – Conference co-champions; ^ – FCS playoff participant; Rankings from The Sports Network poll

The 2006 Samford Bulldogs football team represented Samford University as a member of the Ohio Valley Conference (OVC) during the 2006 NCAA Division I FCS football season. Led by sixth-year head coach Bill Gray, the Bulldogs compiled an overall record of 3–8, with a mark of 1–7 in conference play, and finished eighth in the OVC. The team played home games at Seibert Stadium in Homewood, Alabama.

== Schedule ==
Date	Time	Opponent	Site	Result	Attendance	Source
August 31	7:00 p.m.	Miles*	Seibert Stadium; Homewood, AL	W 37–7	10,386	
September 9	2:30 p.m.	at Georgia Tech*	Bobby Dodd Stadium; Atlanta, GA	L 6–38	47,149	
September 14	7:00 p.m.	Austin Peay*	Seibert Stadium; Homewood, AL	W 17–10	4,490	
September 23	6:00 p.m.	No. 20 Eastern Illinois	Seibert Stadium; Homewood, AL	L 13–24	5,355	
September 30	6:00 p.m.	at Southeast Missouri State	Houck Stadium; Cape Girardeau, MO	L 14–19	9,650	
October 7	1:00 p.m.	Eastern Kentucky	Seibert Stadium; Homewood, AL	L 12–31	2,883	
October 14	3:00 p.m.	at Murray State	Roy Stewart Stadium; Murray, KY	W 33–7	5,801	
October 21	2:00 p.m.	Tennessee–Martin	Seibert Stadium; Homewood, AL	L 6–10	5,840	
October 28	6:00 p.m.	at Tennessee State	LP Field; Nashville, TN	L 7–29	18,758	
November 4	1:00 p.m.	Tennessee Tech	Seibert Stadium; Homewood, AL	L 14–20	2,967	
November 11	11:00 a.m.	at Jacksonville State	Paul Snow Stadium; Jacksonville, AL (rivalry)	L 7–55	7,211	
*Non-conference game; Rankings from The Sports Network Poll released prior to the game; All times are in Central time
