= 2006 Sacramento State Hornets football team =

American college football season

2006 Sacramento State Hornets football
- Conference: Big Sky Conference
- Record: 4–7 (4–4 Big Sky)
- Head coach: Steve Mooshagian (4th season)
- Home stadium: Hornet Stadium

2006 Big Sky Conference football standings
	Conf.			Overall
Team	W		L	W		L
No. 3 Montana $^	8	–	0	12	–	2
No. 10 Montana State ^	6	–	2	8	–	5
No. 19 Portland State	6	–	2	7	–	4
Northern Arizona	5	–	3	6	–	5
Sacramento State	4	–	4	4	–	7
Weber State	3	–	5	4	–	7
Eastern Washington	3	–	5	3	–	8
Idaho State	1	–	7	2	–	9
Northern Colorado	0	–	8	1	–	10
$ – Conference champion; ^ – FCS playoff participant; Rankings from The Sports Network poll

The 2006 Sacramento State Hornets football team represented California State University, Sacramento as a member of the Big Sky Conference during the 2006 NCAA Division I FCS football season. Led by Steve Mooshagian in fourth and final season as head coach, Sacramento State compiled an overall record of 4–7 with a mark of 4–4 in conference play, placing fifth in the Big Sky. The team was outscored by its opponents 288 to 168 for the season. The Hornets played home games at Hornet Stadium in Sacramento, California.

Mooshagian finished his tenure as Sacramento State with record of 11–33, for a .333 winning percentage.

== Schedule ==
Date	Time	Opponent	Site	TV	Result	Attendance	Source
August 31	6:00 p.m.	at Boise State*	Bronco Stadium; Boise, ID	KTVB	L 0–45	29,674	
September 16		No. 3 Cal Poly*	Hornet Stadium; Sacramento, CA		L 10–17	8,143	
September 23	12:00 p.m.	at No. 5 Montana	Washington–Grizzly Stadium; Missoula, MT	KPAX	L 14–59	23,619	
September 30		at Eastern Washington	Woodward Field; Cheney, WA		W 21–20	6,738	
October 7	6:05 p.m.	Weber State	Hornet Stadium; Sacramento, CA		W 24–21	7,184	
October 14	5:05 p.m.	Montana State	Hornet Stadium; Sacramento, CA		L 18–21	5,260	
October 21		at Northern Arizona	Walkup Skydome; Flagstaff, AZ		L 22–39	7,362	
October 28		Northern Colorado	Hornet Stadium; Sacramento, CA		W 14–9	4,109	
November 4		at Idaho State	Holt Arena; Pocatello, ID		W 22–14	6,298	
November 11		No. 23 Portland State	Hornet Stadium; Sacramento, CA		L 7–13	4,410	
November 18	1:05 p.m.	at UC Davis*	Toomey Field; Davis, CA (Causeway Classic)		L 16–30	7,905	
*Non-conference game; Rankings from The Sports Network Poll released prior to the game; All times are in Pacific time
