= 2006 Howard Bison football team =

American college football season

2006 Howard Bison football
- Conference: Mid-Eastern Athletic Conference
- Record: 5–6 (4–4 MEAC)
- Head coach: Rayford Petty (5th season)
- Home stadium: William H. Greene Stadium

2006 Mid-Eastern Athletic Conference football standings
	Conf.			Overall
Team	W		L	W		L
No. 11 Hampton $^	7	–	1	10	–	2
Delaware State	6	–	2	8	–	3
South Carolina State	6	–	2	7	–	4
Florida A&M	5	–	3	7	–	4
Howard	4	–	4	5	–	6
Morgan State	4	–	4	5	–	6
Bethune–Cookman	3	–	5	5	–	6
Norfolk State	1	–	7	4	–	7
North Carolina A&T	0	–	8	0	–	11
$ – Conference champion; ^ – FCS playoff participant; Rankings from The Sports Network poll

The 2006 Howard Bison football team represented Howard University as a member of the Mid-Eastern Athletic Conference (MEAC) during the 2006 NCAA Division I FCS football season. Led by fifth-year head coach Rayford Petty, the Bison compiled an overall record of 5–6, with a conference record of 4–4, and finished tied for fifth in the MEAC.

== Schedule ==
Date	Opponent	Site	Result	Attendance	Source
September 9	at No. 14 Hampton	Armstrong Stadium; Hampton, VA (rivalry)	L 7–46	12,188	
September 16	Florida A&M	William H. Greene Stadium; Washington, DC	L 23–31	6,035	
September 23	at No. 23 (FBS) Rutgers*	Rutgers Stadium; Piscataway, NJ	L 7–56	35,558	
September 30	Fort Valley State*	William H. Greene Stadium; Washington, DC	W 34–19		
October 7	at Winston-Salem State*	Bowman Gray Stadium; Winston-Salem, NC	L 0–12	11,000	
October 14	Morgan State	William H. Greene Stadium; Washington, DC (rivalry)	L 12–18 ^{2OT}	7,035	
October 21	at North Carolina A&T	Aggie Stadium; Greensboro, NC	W 26–0	21,500	
October 28	Norfolk State	William H. Greene Stadium; Washington, DC	W 13–10		
November 4	at South Carolina State	Oliver C. Dawson Stadium; Orangeburg, SC	L 10–28	18,155	
November 11	at Bethune–Cookman	Municipal Stadium; Daytona Beach, FL	W 28–0	5,425	
November 18	No. 23 Delaware State	William H. Greene Stadium; Washington, DC	W 20–17	1,086	
*Non-conference game; Rankings from The Sports Network Poll released prior to the game
