= 2006 Central Arkansas Bears football team =

American college football season

2006 Central Arkansas Bears football
- Conference: Independent

Ranking
- Sports Network: No. 24
- Record: 8–3
- Head coach: Clint Conque (7th season)
- Offensive coordinator: Brooks Hollingsworth (3rd season)
- Home stadium: Estes Stadium

2006 NCAA Division I FCS independents football standings
	Conf.			Overall
Team	W		L	W		L
No. 24 Central Arkansas*		–		8	–	3
Winston-Salem State		–		4	–	7
Austin Peay		–		3	–	8
Savannah State		–		2	–	9
* – Ineligible for postseason play due to transition from NCAA Division II; Rankings from The Sports Network poll

The 2006 Central Arkansas Bears football team represented the University of Central Arkansas as an independent during the 2006 NCAA Division I FCS football season. Led by seventh-year head coach Clint Conque, the Bears compiled a record of 8–3. Central Arkansas played home games at Estes Stadium in Conway, Arkansas.

== Schedule ==
Date	Time	Opponent	Site	Result	Attendance	Source
August 31	7:00 pm	vs. Henderson State	War Memorial Stadium; Little Rock, AR	W 39–6	10,515	
September 9	6:30 pm	at No. 7 Illinois State	Hancock Stadium; Normal, IL	L 3–18	10,262	
September 16	6:00 pm	Missouri State	Estes Stadium; Conway, AR	W 16–14	11,215	
September 23	6:00 pm	at Stephen F. Austin	Homer Bryce Stadium; Nacogdoches, TX	W 37–35	6,312	
September 30	2:00 pm	South Dakota	Estes Stadium; Conway, AR	W 24–0	10,415	
October 7	7:00 pm	at South Dakota State	Coughlin–Alumni Stadium; Brookings, SD	L 7–20	12,332	
October 14	3:05 pm	at No. 18 UC Davis	Toomey Field; Davis, CA	L 13–33	7,100	
October 19	7:00 pm	at Sam Houston State	Bowers Stadium; Huntsville, TX	W 38–30	7,130	
November 4	6:00 pm	Southern Arkansas	Estes Stadium; Conway, AR	W 55–21	10,811	
November 11	1:00 pm	Augustana (SD)	Estes Stadium; Conway, AR	W 37–13	6,815	
November 18	12:00 pm	at Georgia Southern	Paulson Stadium; Statesboro, GA	W 34–31 ^{OT}	11,159	
Rankings from The Sports Network Poll released prior to the game; All times are in Central time
