= 2006 Tennessee State Tigers football team =

American college football season

2006 Tennessee State Tigers football
- Conference: Ohio Valley Conference
- Record: 6–5 (5–2 OVC)
- Head coach: James Webster (2nd season)
- Offensive coordinator: Fred Kaiss (1st season)
- Home stadium: LP Field

2006 Ohio Valley Conference football standings
	Conf.			Overall
Team	W		L	W		L
No. 15 Eastern Illinois +^	7	–	1	8	–	5
No. 13 Tennessee–Martin +^	6	–	1	9	–	3
Tennessee State	5	–	2	6	–	5
Jacksonville State	5	–	3	6	–	5
Eastern Kentucky	5	–	3	6	–	5
Tennessee Tech	4	–	4	4	–	7
Southeast Missouri State	2	–	6	4	–	7
Samford	1	–	7	3	–	8
Murray State	0	–	8	1	–	10
+ – Conference co-champions; ^ – FCS playoff participant; Rankings from The Sports Network poll

The 2006 Tennessee State Tigers football team represented Tennessee State University as a member of the Ohio Valley Conference (OVC) during the 2006 NCAA Division I FCS football season. Led by second-year head coach James Webster, the Tigers compiled an overall record of 6–5, with a conference record of 5–2, and finished third in the OVC.

== Schedule ==
Date	Opponent	Site	Result	Attendance	Source
September 2	Alabama A&M*	LP Field; Nashville, TN	L 20–27	19,487	
September 9	Murray State	LP Field; Nashville, TN	W 25–15		
September 16	vs. Jackson State*	Liberty Bowl Memorial Stadium; Memphis, TN (Southern Heritage Classic)	W 31–30 ^{OT}	53,441	
September 23	at Vanderbilt*	Vanderbilt Stadium; Nashville, TN	L 9–38	27,460	
September 30	vs. Florida A&M*	Georgia Dome; Atlanta, GA (Atlanta Football Classic)	L 22–25	57,885	
October 14	Tennessee Tech	LP Field; Nashville, TN	W 30–20	9,720	
October 21	at Jacksonville State	Paul Snow Stadium; Jacksonville, AL	W 38–31	11,800	
October 28	Samford^{†}	LP Field; Nashville, TN	W 29–7	18,758	
November 4	at No. 20 Eastern Illinois	O'Brien Field; Charleston, IL	L 3–29	5,912	
November 11	Southeast Missouri State	LP Field; Nashville, TN	W 31–0		
November 18	at Eastern Kentucky	Roy Kidd Stadium; Richmond, KY	L 3–20	5,500	
*Non-conference game; ^{†}Homecoming; Rankings from The Sports Network Poll released prior to the game
