= 2006 Northern Arizona Lumberjacks football team =

American college football season

2006 Northern Arizona Lumberjacks football
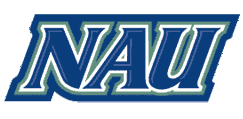
- Conference: Big Sky Conference
- Record: 6–5 (5–3 Big Sky)
- Head coach: Jerome Souers (9th season)
- Home stadium: Walkup Skydome

2006 Big Sky Conference football standings
	Conf.			Overall
Team	W		L	W		L
No. 3 Montana $^	8	–	0	12	–	2
No. 10 Montana State ^	6	–	2	8	–	5
No. 19 Portland State	6	–	2	7	–	4
Northern Arizona	5	–	3	6	–	5
Sacramento State	4	–	4	4	–	7
Weber State	3	–	5	4	–	7
Eastern Washington	3	–	5	3	–	8
Idaho State	1	–	7	2	–	9
Northern Colorado	0	–	8	1	–	10
$ – Conference champion; ^ – FCS playoff participant; Rankings from The Sports Network poll

The 2006 Northern Arizona Lumberjacks football team was an American football team that represented Northern Arizona University (NAU) as a member of the Big Sky Conference (Big Sky) during the 2006 NCAA Division I FCS football season. In their ninth year under head coach Jerome Souers, the Lumberjacks compiled a 6–5 record (5–3 against conference opponents), outscored opponents by a total of 378 to 296, and finished fourth out of nine teams in the Big Sky.

The team played its home games at the J. Lawrence Walkup Skydome, commonly known as the Walkup Skydome, in Flagstaff, Arizona.

== Schedule ==
Date	Time	Opponent	Site	TV	Result	Attendance	Source
August 31	7:00 p.m.	at No. 24 Arizona State*	Sun Devil Stadium; Tempe, AZ	FSNAZ	L 14–35	53,540	
September 9	6:00 p.m.	at Utah*	Rice–Eccles Stadium; Salt Lake City, UT	MTN	L 7–45	43,327	
September 16		Dixie State*	Walkup Skydome; Flagstaff, AZ		W 66–14	7,283	
September 23		at Idaho State	Holt Arena; Pocatello, ID		W 33–27	10,016	
September 30	3:05 p.m.	Montana State	Walkup Skydome; Flagstaff, AZ		L 32–39	8,173	
October 14	1:00 p.m.	at No. 3 Montana	Washington–Grizzly Stadium; Missoula, MT	KPAX	L 21–24	23,626	
October 21		Sacramento State^{†}	Walkup Skydome; Flagstaff, AZ		W 39–22	7,362	
October 28		at Eastern Washington	Woodward Field; Cheney, WA		W 34–26	5,498	
November 4		No. 25 Portland State	Walkup Skydome; Flagstaff, AZ		L 26–34	5,413	
November 11	3:05 p.m.	Weber State	Walkup Skydome; Flagstaff, AZ		W 42–17	4,811	
November 18		at Northern Colorado	Nottingham Field; Greeley, CO		W 54–3	3,012	
*Non-conference game; ^{†}Homecoming; Rankings from Coaches' Poll released prior to the game; All times are in Mountain time
