= 2006 NCAA Division I FCS football season =

American college football season

2006 NCAA Division I FCS season
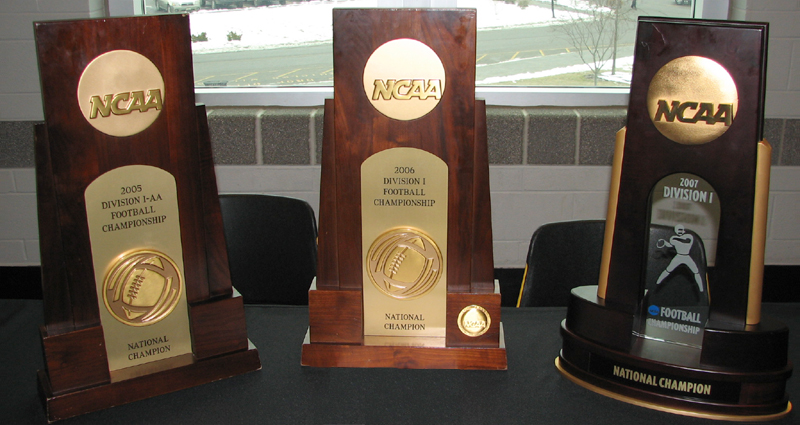
- 2006 FCS National Championship trophy (middle).

Regular season
- Number of teams: 122
- Duration: August 26 – November 18
- Payton Award: Ricky Santos
- Buchanan Award: Kyle Shotwell

Playoff
- Duration: November 25 – December 15
- Championship date: December 15, 2006
- Championship site: Finley Stadium; Chattanooga, Tennessee
- Champion: Appalachian State

NCAA Division I FCS football seasons
- «2005 2007»

The 2006 NCAA Division I FCS football season, the 2006 season of college football for teams in the Football Championship Subdivision (FCS), began on August 26, 2006 and concluded on December 15, 2006, in Chattanooga, Tennessee, at the 2006 NCAA Division I Football Championship Game where the Appalachian State Mountaineers defeated the UMass Minutemen, 28–17.

Prior to the 2006 season, NCAA Division I-A was renamed NCAA Division I Football Bowl Subdivision (FBS), and NCAA Division I-AA was renamed NCAA Division I Football Championship Subdivision (FCS).

== Conference changes and new programs ==
School	2005 Conference	2006 Conference
Austin Peay	Pioneer	FCS Independent
Central Arkansas	Gulf South (D-II)	FCS Independent
Northern Colorado	Great West	Big Sky
Winston-Salem State	CIAA (D-II)	FCS Independent

== FCS team wins over FBS teams ==
- September 2 – Montana State 19, Colorado 10
- September 2 – Portland State 17 New Mexico 7
- September 2 – Richmond 13, Duke 0
- September 9 – New Hampshire 34, Northwestern 17
- September 16 – Southern Illinois 35, Indiana 28
- September 23 – North Dakota State 29, Ball State 24
- October 28 - Cal Poly SLO 16, San Diego State 14

== Conference standings ==
2006 Atlantic 10 Conference football standings
	Conf.			Overall
Team	W		L	W		L
North Division
No. 2 UMass x$^	8	–	0	13	–	2
No. 6 New Hampshire ^	5	–	3	9	–	4
Maine	5	–	3	6	–	5
Northeastern	4	–	4	5	–	6
Rhode Island	2	–	6	4	–	7
Hofstra	1	–	7	2	–	9
South Division
No. 9 James Madison x^	7	–	1	9	–	3
Villanova	5	–	3	6	–	5
Towson	4	–	4	7	–	4
Richmond	3	–	5	6	–	5
Delaware	3	–	5	5	–	6
William & Mary	1	–	7	3	–	8
$ – Conference champion; x – Division champion/co-champions; ^ – FCS playoff participant; Rankings from The Sports Network poll

2006 Big Sky Conference football standings
	Conf.			Overall
Team	W		L	W		L
No. 3 Montana $^	8	–	0	12	–	2
No. 10 Montana State ^	6	–	2	8	–	5
No. 19 Portland State	6	–	2	7	–	4
Northern Arizona	5	–	3	6	–	5
Sacramento State	4	–	4	4	–	7
Weber State	3	–	5	4	–	7
Eastern Washington	3	–	5	3	–	8
Idaho State	1	–	7	2	–	9
Northern Colorado	0	–	8	1	–	10
$ – Conference champion; ^ – FCS playoff participant; Rankings from The Sports Network poll

2006 Big South Conference football standings
	Conf.			Overall
Team	W		L	W		L
No. 14 Coastal Carolina $^	4	–	0	9	–	3
Charleston Southern	2	–	2	9	–	2
Gardner–Webb	2	–	2	6	–	5
Liberty	2	–	2	6	–	5
VMI	0	–	4	1	–	10
$ – Conference champion; ^ – FCS playoff participant; Rankings from The Sports Network poll

2006 Gateway Football Conference standings
	Conf.			Overall
Team	W		L	W		L
No. 4 Youngstown State $^	6	–	1	11	–	3
No. 8 Illinois State ^	5	–	2	9	–	4
No. 17 Northern Iowa	5	–	2	7	–	4
No. 7 Southern Illinois ^	4	–	3	9	–	4
Western Kentucky	4	–	3	6	–	5
Western Illinois	2	–	5	5	–	6
Missouri State	1	–	6	2	–	9
Indiana State	1	–	6	1	–	10
$ – Conference champion; ^ – FCS playoff participant; Rankings from The Sports Network poll

2006 Great West Conference football standings
	Conf.			Overall
Team	W		L	W		L
No. 5 North Dakota State $	4	–	0	10	–	1
No. 22 South Dakota State	3	–	1	7	–	4
No. 16 Cal Poly	2	–	2	7	–	4
UC Davis	1	–	3	6	–	5
Southern Utah	0	–	4	3	–	8
$ – Conference champion; Rankings from The Sports Network poll

2006 Ivy League football standings
	Conf.			Overall
Team	W		L	W		L
No. 18 Princeton +	6	–	1	9	–	1
No. 25 Yale +	6	–	1	8	–	2
Harvard	4	–	3	7	–	3
Penn	3	–	4	5	–	5
Cornell	3	–	4	5	–	5
Dartmouth	2	–	5	2	–	8
Columbia	2	–	5	5	–	5
Brown	2	–	5	3	–	7
+ – Conference co-champions; Rankings from The Sports Network poll

2006 Metro Atlantic Athletic Conference football standings
	Conf.			Overall
Team	W		L	W		L
Duquesne +	3	–	1	7	–	3
Marist +	3	–	1	4	–	7
Iona	2	–	2	3	–	7
La Salle	1	–	3	3	–	7
Saint Peter's	1	–	3	2	–	8
+ – Conference co-champions

2006 Mid-Eastern Athletic Conference football standings
	Conf.			Overall
Team	W		L	W		L
No. 11 Hampton $^	7	–	1	10	–	2
Delaware State	6	–	2	8	–	3
South Carolina State	6	–	2	7	–	4
Florida A&M	5	–	3	7	–	4
Howard	4	–	4	5	–	6
Morgan State	4	–	4	5	–	6
Bethune–Cookman	3	–	5	5	–	6
Norfolk State	1	–	7	4	–	7
North Carolina A&T	0	–	8	0	–	11
$ – Conference champion; ^ – FCS playoff participant; Rankings from The Sports Network poll

2006 Northeast Conference football standings
	Conf.			Overall
Team	W		L	W		L
Monmouth $	6	–	1	10	–	2
Albany	5	–	2	7	–	4
Robert Morris	5	–	2	7	–	4
Stony Brook	5	–	2	5	–	6
Central Connecticut State	4	–	3	8	–	3
Saint Francis (PA)	2	–	5	3	–	8
Sacred Heart	1	–	6	2	–	9
Wagner	0	–	7	4	–	7
$ – Conference champion

2006 Ohio Valley Conference football standings
	Conf.			Overall
Team	W		L	W		L
No. 15 Eastern Illinois +^	7	–	1	8	–	5
No. 13 Tennessee–Martin +^	6	–	1	9	–	3
Tennessee State	5	–	2	6	–	5
Jacksonville State	5	–	3	6	–	5
Eastern Kentucky	5	–	3	6	–	5
Tennessee Tech	4	–	4	4	–	7
Southeast Missouri State	2	–	6	4	–	7
Samford	1	–	7	3	–	8
Murray State	0	–	8	1	–	10
+ – Conference co-champions; ^ – FCS playoff participant; Rankings from The Sports Network poll

2006 Patriot League football standings
	Conf.			Overall
Team	W		L	W		L
Lafayette +^	5	–	1	6	–	6
Lehigh +	5	–	1	6	–	5
Holy Cross	4	–	2	7	–	4
Bucknell	3	–	3	6	–	5
Colgate	3	–	3	4	–	7
Fordham	1	–	5	3	–	8
Georgetown	0	–	6	2	–	9
+ – Conference co-champions; ^ – FCS playoff participant; Rankings from The Sports Network poll

2006 Pioneer Football League standings
	Conf.			Overall
Team	W		L	W		L
No. 20 San Diego $	7	–	0	11	–	1
Drake	6	–	1	9	–	2
Davidson	5	–	2	6	–	4
Jacksonville	4	–	3	4	–	6
Butler	2	–	5	3	–	8
Morehead State	2	–	5	2	–	9
Dayton	1	–	6	4	–	6
Valparaiso	1	–	6	3	–	8
$ – Conference champion; ^ – FCS playoff participant; Rankings from The Sports Network poll

2006 Southern Conference football standings
	Conf.			Overall
Team	W		L	W		L
No. 1 Appalachian State $^	7	–	0	14	–	1
No. 12 Furman ^	6	–	1	8	–	4
No. 23 Wofford	5	–	2	7	–	4
The Citadel	4	–	3	5	–	6
Elon	2	–	5	5	–	6
Chattanooga	2	–	5	3	–	8
Georgia Southern	2	–	5	3	–	8
Western Carolina	0	–	7	2	–	9
$ – Conference champion; ^ – FCS playoff participant; Rankings from The Sports Network poll

2006 Southland Conference football standings
	Conf.			Overall
Team	W		L	W		L
No. 21 McNeese State $^	5	–	1	7	–	5
Sam Houston State	4	–	2	6	–	5
Stephen F. Austin	4	–	2	4	–	7
Texas State	3	–	3	5	–	6
Nicholls State	2	–	4	4	–	7
Northwestern State	2	–	4	4	–	7
Southeastern Louisiana	1	–	5	2	–	9
$ – Conference champion; ^ – FCS playoff participant; Rankings from The Sports Network poll

2006 Southwestern Athletic Conference football standings
	Conf.			Overall
Team	W		L	W		L
East Division
Alabama A&M xy$	6	–	3	9	–	3
Jackson State	5	–	4	6	–	5
Alcorn State	5	–	4	6	–	5
Mississippi Valley State	5	–	4	6	–	5
Alabama State	5	–	4	5	–	6
West Division
Arkansas–Pine Bluff xy	7	–	2	8	–	4
Southern	4	–	5	5	–	6
Grambling State	3	–	6	3	–	8
Texas Southern	3	–	6	3	–	8
Prairie View A&M	2	–	7	3	–	7
Championship: Alabama A&M 22, Arkansas–Pine Bluff 13
$ – Conference champion; x – Division champion/co-champions; y – Championship game participant

2006 NCAA Division I FCS independents football standings
	Conf.			Overall
Team	W		L	W		L
No. 24 Central Arkansas*		–		8	–	3
Winston-Salem State		–		4	–	7
Austin Peay		–		3	–	8
Savannah State		–		2	–	9
* – Ineligible for postseason play due to transition from NCAA Division II; Rankings from The Sports Network poll

== Conference champions ==
=== Automatic berths ===
Conference	Champion
Atlantic 10 Conference	Massachusetts
Big Sky Conference	Montana
Gateway Football Conference	Youngstown State
Mid-Eastern Athletic Conference	Hampton
Ohio Valley Conference	Eastern Illinois and UT Martin
Patriot League	Colgate, Lafayette, and Lehigh
Southern Conference	Appalachian State
Southland Conference	McNeese State

=== Invitation ===
Conference	Champion
Big South Conference	Coastal Carolina
Great West Football Conference	North Dakota State
Metro Atlantic Athletic Conference	Duquesne and Marist
Northeast Conference	Monmouth
Pioneer Football League	San Diego

=== Abstains ===
Conference	Champion
Ivy League	Princeton and Yale
Southwestern Athletic Conference	Alabama A&M

== Postseason ==
=== NCAA Division I playoff bracket ===
First Round
November 25
Campus sites

Quarterfinals
December 2
Campus sites

Semifinals
December 8 and December 9
Campus sites

National Championship Game

December 15
Finley Stadium
Chattanooga, Tennessee

Coastal Carolina
28

1
Appalachian State*
45

1
Appalachian State*
38

Montana State
17

Furman
13

Montana State*
31

1
Appalachian State*
49

4
Youngstown State
24

James Madison
31

4
Youngstown State*
35

4
Youngstown State*
28

Illinois State
21

Illinois State
24

Eastern Illinois*
13

1
Appalachian State
28

3
Massachusetts
17

McNeese State
6

2
Montana*
31

2
Montana*
20

Southern Illinois
3

UT Martin
30

Southern Illinois*
36

2
Montana*
17

3
Massachusetts
19

Lafayette
14

3
Massachusetts*
35

3
Massachusetts*
24

New Hampshire
17

New Hampshire
41

Hampton*
38

* Host institution

=== SWAC Championship Game ===
Date	Location	Venue	West Div. Champion	East Div. Champion	Result
December 16	Birmingham, Alabama	Legion Field	Arkansas-Pine Bluff	Alabama A&M	Alabama A&M, 22–13

=== Gridiron Classic ===
The Gridiron Classic is an annual game between the champions of the Northeast Conference and the Pioneer Football League that has been held since December 2006.

Date	Location	Venue	NEC Champion	PFL Champion	Result
December 2	West Long Branch, New Jersey	Kessler Field	Monmouth	San Diego	San Diego, 27–7

== Final poll standings ==
Standings are from The Sports Network final 2006 poll.

Rank	Team	Record
1	Appalachian State Mountaineers	14–1
2	Massachusetts Minutemen	13–2
3	Montana Grizzlies	12–2
4	Youngstown State Penguins	11–3
5	North Dakota State Bison	10–1
6	New Hampshire Wildcats	9–4
7	Southern Illinois Salukis	9–4
8	Illinois State Redbirds	9–4
9	James Madison Dukes	9–3
10	Montana State Bobcats	8–5
11	Hampton Pirates	10–2
12	Furman Paladins	8–4
13	UT Martin Skyhawks	9–3
14	Coastal Carolina Chanticleers	9–3
15	Eastern Illinois Panthers	8–5
16	Cal Poly Mustangs	7–4
17	Northern Iowa Panthers	7–4
18	Princeton Tigers	9–1
19	Portland State Vikings	7–4
20	San Diego Toreros	11–1
21	McNeese State Cowboys	7–5
22	South Dakota State Jackrabbits	7–4
23	Wofford Terriers	7–4
24	Central Arkansas Bears	8–3
25	Yale Bulldogs	8–2

== Rule changes ==
There are several rules that have changed for the 2006 season. Following are some highlights:

- Players may only wear clear eyeshields. Previously, both tinted and orange were also allowed.
- The kicking tee has been lowered from two inches tall to only one inch.
- Halftime lasts twenty minutes. Previously, it was only fifteen minutes.
- On a kickoff, the game clock starts when the ball is kicked rather than when the receiving team touches it.
  - This rule change has resulted in controversy, highlighted by the matchup between Wisconsin and Penn State on November 4, 2006, in which Wisconsin deliberately went off-sides on two consecutive kickoffs to run extra time off the clock at the close of the first half.
- On a change of possession, the clock starts when the referee marks the ball ready for play, instead of on the snap.
- The referee may no longer stop the game due to excessive crowd noise.
- When a live-ball penalty such as an illegal formation occurs on a kick, the receiving team may choose either to add the penalty yardage to the end of the return or require the kick to be attempted again with the spot moved back. Previously, only the latter option was available.
- If a team scores at the end of the game, they will not kick the extra point unless it would affect the outcome of the game.
- Instant replay is now officially sanctioned and standardized. All plays are reviewed by the replay officials as the play occurs. They may call down to the on-field officials to stop play if they need extra time to make a review. Each coach may also make one challenge per game. In the case of a coach's challenge, the coach must have at least one time-out remaining. If the challenge is upheld the coach gets the time-out back but the challenge is spent. If the challenge is rejected, both the challenge and the time-out are spent.
