= 2006 Wagner Seahawks football team =

American college football season

2006 Wagner Seahawks football
- Conference: Northeast Conference
- Record: 4–7 (0–7 NEC)
- Head coach: Walt Hameline (26th season)
- Home stadium: Wagner College Stadium

2006 Northeast Conference football standings
	Conf.			Overall
Team	W		L	W		L
Monmouth $	6	–	1	10	–	2
Albany	5	–	2	7	–	4
Robert Morris	5	–	2	7	–	4
Stony Brook	5	–	2	5	–	6
Central Connecticut State	4	–	3	8	–	3
Saint Francis (PA)	2	–	5	3	–	8
Sacred Heart	1	–	6	2	–	9
Wagner	0	–	7	4	–	7
$ – Conference champion

The 2006 Wagner Seahawks football team represented Wagner College in the 2006 NCAA Division I FCS football season as a member of the Northeast Conference (NEC). The Seahawks were led by 26th-year head coach Walt Hameline and played their home games at Wagner College Stadium. Wagner finished the season 4–7 overall and 0–7 in NEC play to place eighth.

== Schedule ==
Date	Time	Opponent	Site	Result	Attendance
August 31	7:00 p.m.	at La Salle*	McCarthy Stadium; Philadelphia, PA	W 38–15	3,845
September 9	1:00 p.m.	Iona*	Wagner College Stadium; Staten Island, NY	W 7–3	3,792
September 16	7:00 p.m.	at Marist*	Leonidoff Field; Poughkeepsie, NY	W 38–7	2,241
September 23	1:00 p.m.	Saint Peter's*	Wagner College Stadium; Staten Island, NY	W 18–15	3,387
September 30	1:00 p.m.	at Sacred Heart	Campus Field; Fairfield, CT	L 17–25	2,856
October 7	1:00 p.m.	Robert Morris	Wagner College Stadium; Staten Island, NY	L 10–14	3,204
October 14	1:00 p.m.	Monmouth	Wagner College Stadium; Staten Island, NY	L 7–28	3,311
October 21	Noon	at Central Connecticut	Arute Field; New Britain, CT	L 6–27	2,956
October 28	4:00 p.m.	at Albany	University Field; Albany, NY	L 0–34	620
November 4	1:00 p.m.	Stony Brook	Wagner College Stadium; Staten Island, NY	L 9–45	2,417
November 11	1:00 p.m.	at Saint Francis (PA)	DeGol Field; Loretto, PA	L 14–35	1,212
*Non-conference game; All times are in Eastern time
