= 2006 Delaware State Hornets football team =

American college football season

2006 Delaware State Hornets football
- Conference: Mid-Eastern Athletic Conference
- Record: 8–3 (6–2 MEAC)
- Head coach: Al Lavan (3rd season)
- Home stadium: Alumni Stadium

2006 Mid-Eastern Athletic Conference football standings
	Conf.			Overall
Team	W		L	W		L
No. 11 Hampton $^	7	–	1	10	–	2
Delaware State	6	–	2	8	–	3
South Carolina State	6	–	2	7	–	4
Florida A&M	5	–	3	7	–	4
Howard	4	–	4	5	–	6
Morgan State	4	–	4	5	–	6
Bethune–Cookman	3	–	5	5	–	6
Norfolk State	1	–	7	4	–	7
North Carolina A&T	0	–	8	0	–	11
$ – Conference champion; ^ – FCS playoff participant; Rankings from The Sports Network poll

The 2006 Delaware State Hornets football team represented Delaware State University as a member of the Mid-Eastern Athletic Conference (MEAC) in the 2006 NCAA Division I FCS football season. The Hornets were led by third-year head coach Al Lavan and played their home games at Alumni Stadium. They finished the season 8–3 overall and 6–2 in conference play to tie for second in the MEAC.

== Schedule ==
Date	Time	Opponent	Rank	Site	Result	Attendance	Source
September 2	1:00 p.m.	vs. Florida A&M		Ford Field; Detroit, MI (Detroit Football Classic)	W 34–14	29,713	
September 9	7:00 p.m.	Saint Francis (PA)*		Alumni Stadium; Dover, DE	W 63–28	3,113	
September 16	7:00 p.m.	at Northwestern State*		Harry Turpin Stadium; Natchitoches, LA	L 3–23	10,215	
September 30	7:00 p.m.	No. 12 Hampton		Alumni Stadium; Dover, DE	L 14–29	5,449	
October 7	4:00 p.m.	at Bethune–Cookman		Municipal Stadium; Daytona Beach, FL	W 33–31	5,241	
October 14	1:00 p.m.	North Carolina A&T		Alumni Stadium; Dover, DE	W 37–21	4,577	
October 21	1:00 p.m.	at Morgan State		Hughes Stadium; Baltimore, MD	W 29–7	13,557	
October 28	7:00 p.m.	South Carolina State		Alumni Stadium; Dover, DE	W 10–9	2,512	
November 4	1:00 p.m.	Concord*		Alumni Stadium; Dover, DE	W 62–0	1,863	
November 11	1:00 p.m.	at Norfolk State		William "Dick" Price Stadium; Norfolk, VA	W 33–10	6,888	
November 18	12:00 p.m.	at Howard	No. 23	William H. Greene Stadium; Washington, DC	L 17–20	1,086	
*Non-conference game; Rankings from The Sports Network Poll released prior to the game
