= 2006 La Salle Explorers football team =

American college football season

2006 La Salle Explorers football
- Conference: Metro Atlantic Athletic Conference
- Record: 3–7 (1–3 MAAC)
- Head coach: Tim Miller (1st season)
- Home stadium: McCarthy Stadium

2006 Metro Atlantic Athletic Conference football standings
	Conf.			Overall
Team	W		L	W		L
Duquesne +	3	–	1	7	–	3
Marist +	3	–	1	4	–	7
Iona	2	–	2	3	–	7
La Salle	1	–	3	3	–	7
Saint Peter's	1	–	3	2	–	8
+ – Conference co-champions

The 2006 La Salle Explorers football team was an American football team that represented La Salle University as a member of the Metro Atlantic Athletic Conference (MAAC) during the 2006 NCAA Division I FCS football season. In their first year under head coach Tim Miller, the Explorers compiled a 3–7 record.

== Schedule ==
Date	Opponent	Site	Result	Attendance	Source
August 31	Wagner*	McCarthy Stadium; Philadelphia, PA	L 15–38	3,845	
September 8	TCNJ*	McCarthy Stadium; Philadelphia, PA	L 21–24		
September 16	at Ursinus*	Patterson Field; Collegeville, PA	L 2–6		
September 23	at Saint Francis (PA)*	DeGol Field; Loretto, PA	W 24–21	1,115	
October 7	Marist	McCarthy Stadium; Philadelphia, PA	L 13–41		
October 14	at Catholic University*	Cardinal Stadium; Washington, DC	W 27–14		
October 21	at Iona	Mazzella Field; New Rochelle, NY	L 0–28		
October 28	Husson*	McCarthy Stadium; Philadelphia, PA	L 7–17		
November 4	Duquesne	McCarthy Stadium; Philadelphia, PA	L 0–38		
November 9	at Saint Peter's	Cochrane Stadium; Jersey City, NJ	W 37–28		
*Non-conference game
