= 2006 Saint Francis Red Flash football team =

American college football season

2006 Saint Francis Red Flash football
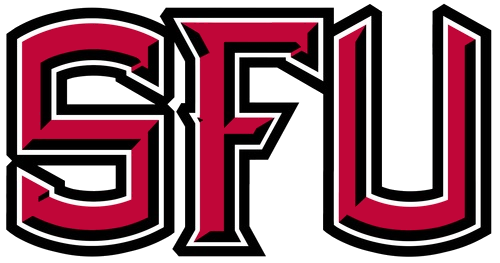
- Conference: Northeast Conference
- Record: 3–8 (2–5 NEC)
- Head coach: Dave Opfar (5th season)
- Home stadium: DeGol Field

2006 Northeast Conference football standings
	Conf.			Overall
Team	W		L	W		L
Monmouth $	6	–	1	10	–	2
Albany	5	–	2	7	–	4
Robert Morris	5	–	2	7	–	4
Stony Brook	5	–	2	5	–	6
Central Connecticut State	4	–	3	8	–	3
Saint Francis (PA)	2	–	5	3	–	8
Sacred Heart	1	–	6	2	–	9
Wagner	0	–	7	4	–	7
$ – Conference champion

The 2006 Saint Francis Red Flash football team represented Saint Francis University as a member of the Northeast Conference (NEC) during the 2006 NCAA Division I FCS football season. The Red Flash were led by fifth-year head coach Dave Opfar and played their home games at the newly constructed DeGol Field, which was in its first year as the home of the Red Flash. They finished the season 3–8 overall and 2–5 in NEC play to place fourth.

== Schedule ==
Date	Time	Opponent	Site	Result	Attendance
September 2	1:00 p.m.	Saint Peter's*	DeGol Field; Loretto, PA	W 38–3	1,185
September 9	7:00 p.m.	at Delaware State*	Alumni Stadium; Dover, DE	L 28–63	3,113
September 16	1:00 p.m.	at Duquesne*	Rooney Field; Pittsburgh, PA	L 10–41	4,614
September 23	1:00 p.m.	La Salle*	DeGol Field; Loretto, PA	L 21–24	1,115
September 30	4:00 p.m.	Robert Morris	DeGol Field; Loretto, PA	L 13–45	1,394
October 7	1:00 p.m.	at Central Connecticut State	Arute Field; New Britain, CT	L 21–62	4,026
October 14	1:00 p.m.	Stony Brook	DeGol Field; Loretto, PA	L 20–30	716
October 21	4:00 p.m.	at Albany	University Field; Albany, NY	L 0–48	5,964
October 28	1:00 p.m.	Sacred Heart	DeGol Field; Loretto, PA	W 21–14	545
November 4	1:00 p.m.	at Monmouth	Kessler Field; West Long Branch, NJ	L 20–54	3,817
November 11	1:00 p.m.	Wagner	DeGol Field; Loretto, PA	W 35–14	1,212
*Non-conference game; All times are in Eastern time
