= 2006 Portland State Vikings football team =

American college football season

2006 Portland State Vikings football
- Conference: Big Sky Conference

Ranking
- Sports Network: No. 19
- Record: 7–4 (6–2 Big Sky)
- Head coach: Tim Walsh (15th season)
- Home stadium: PGE Park

2006 Big Sky Conference football standings
	Conf.			Overall
Team	W		L	W		L
No. 3 Montana $^	8	–	0	12	–	2
No. 10 Montana State ^	6	–	2	8	–	5
No. 19 Portland State	6	–	2	7	–	4
Northern Arizona	5	–	3	6	–	5
Sacramento State	4	–	4	4	–	7
Weber State	3	–	5	4	–	7
Eastern Washington	3	–	5	3	–	8
Idaho State	1	–	7	2	–	9
Northern Colorado	0	–	8	1	–	10
$ – Conference champion; ^ – FCS playoff participant; Rankings from The Sports Network poll

The 2006 Portland State Vikings football team was an American football team that represented Portland State University during the 2006 NCAA Division I FCS football season as a member of the Big Sky Conference. In their 14th year under head coach Tim Walsh, the team compiled an 7–4 record, with a mark of 6–2 in conference play, and finished tied for second in the Big Sky. The Vikings played their home games at PGE Park in Portland, Oregon.

== Schedule ==
Date	Opponent	Rank	Site	Result	Attendance	Source
September 2	at New Mexico*		University Stadium; Albuquerque, NM	W 17–6	27,535	
September 9	Northern Colorado	No. 21	PGE Park; Portland, OR	W 45–3	4,936	
September 16	at No. 21 (FBS) California*	No. 13	California Memorial Stadium; Berkeley, CA	L 16–42	61,082	
September 23	at Weber State	No. 15	Stewart Stadium; Ogden, UT	W 20–10	6,967	
September 30	No. 4 Montana	No. 14	PGE Park; Portland, OR	L 20–26	13,156	
October 7	at Montana State	No. 15	Bobcat Stadium; Bozeman, MT	L 0–14	14,117	
October 14	Idaho State	No. 25	PGE Park; Portland, OR	W 34–13	4,549	
October 21	Eastern Washington	No. 23	PGE Park; Portland, OR (rivalry)	W 34–0	6,541	
October 28	at No. 25 (FBS) Oregon*	No. 21	Autzen Stadium; Eugene, OR	L 12–55	57,493	
November 4	at Northern Arizona	No. 25	Walkup Skydome; Flagstaff, AZ	W 34–26	5,413	
November 11	at Sacramento State	No. 23	Hornet Stadium; Sacramento, CA	W 13–7	4,410	
*Non-conference game; Rankings from The Sports Network Poll released prior to the game
