= 2006 Jacksonville State Gamecocks football team =

American college football season

2006 Jacksonville State Gamecocks football
- Conference: Ohio Valley Conference
- Record: 6–5 (5–3 OVC)
- Head coach: Jack Crowe (7th season)
- Offensive coordinator: Ronnie Letson (3rd season)
- Defensive coordinator: Greg Stewart (7th season)
- Home stadium: Paul Snow Stadium

2006 Ohio Valley Conference football standings
	Conf.			Overall
Team	W		L	W		L
No. 15 Eastern Illinois +^	7	–	1	8	–	5
No. 13 Tennessee–Martin +^	6	–	1	9	–	3
Tennessee State	5	–	2	6	–	5
Jacksonville State	5	–	3	6	–	5
Eastern Kentucky	5	–	3	6	–	5
Tennessee Tech	4	–	4	4	–	7
Southeast Missouri State	2	–	6	4	–	7
Samford	1	–	7	3	–	8
Murray State	0	–	8	1	–	10
+ – Conference co-champions; ^ – FCS playoff participant; Rankings from The Sports Network poll

The 2006 Jacksonville State Gamecocks football team represented Jacksonville State University as a member of the Ohio Valley Conference (OVC) during the 2006 NCAA Division I-AA football season. Led by Seventh-year head coach Jack Crowe, the Gamecocks compiled an overall record of 6–5 with a mark of 5–3 in conference play, tying for fourth place in the OVC. Jacksonville State played home games at Paul Snow Stadium in Jacksonville, Alabama.

== Schedule ==
Date	Time	Opponent	Rank	Site	TV	Result	Attendance	Source
September 2	12:30 p.m.	at No. 5 Furman*		Paladin Stadium; Greenville, SC	CSTV	L 13–17	10,911	
September 16	2:30 p.m.	Southeast Missouri State		Paul Snow Stadium; Jacksonville, AL		W 38–7	13,862	
September 23	6:00 p.m.	at Tennessee–Martin	No. 25	Graham Stadium; Martin, TN		L 14–24	2,017	
September 30	3:00 p.m.	at Eastern Kentucky		Roy Kidd Stadium; Richmond, KY		W 28–0	7,100	
October 5	5:00 p.m.	Murray State		Paul Snow Stadium; Jacksonville, AL		W 49–17	8,902	
October 14	1:30 p.m.	at Mississippi State*		Davis Wade Stadium; Starkville, MS		L 3–35	38,635	
October 21	2:30 p.m.	Tennessee State		Paul Snow Stadium; Jacksonville, AL		L 31–38	11,800	
October 28	1:00 p.m.	at Tennessee Tech		Tucker Stadium; Cookeville, TN		W 17–10 ^{OT}	3,033	
November 4	5:00 p.m.	at Chattanooga*		Finley Stadium; Chattanooga, TN		W 13–10	7,187	
November 11	11:00 a.m.	Samford		Paul Snow Stadium; Jacksonville, AL (rivalry)		W 55–7	7,211	
November 18	1:30 p.m.	at No. 17 Eastern Illinois		O'Brien Field; Charleston, IL		L 24–28	1,224	
*Non-conference game; Rankings from The Sports Network Poll released prior to the game; All times are in Central time
