= 2006 San Diego Toreros football team =

American college football season

2006 San Diego Toreros football

Consensus mid-major champion PFL champion

Gridiron Classic, W 27–7 at Monmouth
- Conference: Pioneer Football League

Ranking
- Sports Network: No. 20
- Record: 11–1 (7–0 PFL)
- Head coach: Jim Harbaugh (3rd season)
- Home stadium: Torero Stadium

2006 Pioneer Football League standings
	Conf.			Overall
Team	W		L	W		L
No. 20 San Diego $	7	–	0	11	–	1
Drake	6	–	1	9	–	2
Davidson	5	–	2	6	–	4
Jacksonville	4	–	3	4	–	6
Butler	2	–	5	3	–	8
Morehead State	2	–	5	2	–	9
Dayton	1	–	6	4	–	6
Valparaiso	1	–	6	3	–	8
$ – Conference champion; ^ – FCS playoff participant; Rankings from The Sports Network poll

The 2006 San Diego Toreros football team represented the University of San Diego as a member of the Pioneer Football League (PFL) during the 2006 NCAA Division I FCS football season. In their third and final year under head coach Jim Harbaugh, the Toreros compiled an 11–1 record, outscored their opponents 514 to 155, and won the PFL championship.

== Schedule ==
Date	Time	Opponent	Rank	Site	Result	Attendance	Source
September 1		Azusa Pacific*		Torero Stadium; San Diego, CA	W 27–0	4,467	
September 9		Dixie State*		Torero Stadium; San Diego, CA	W 41–7		
September 16		at Yale*		Yale Bowl; New Haven, CT	W 43–17	12,308	
September 30	4:00 p.m.	at Davidson		Richardson Stadium; Davidson, NC	W 50–21	3,189	
October 7		Butler	No. 25	Torero Stadium; San Diego, CA	W 56–3	4,132	
October 14		Valparaiso	No. 21	Torero Stadium; San Diego, CA	W 68–7		
October 21	11:00 a.m.	at Drake	No. 21	Drake Stadium; Des Moines, IA	W 37–0	5,263	
October 28		Morehead State	No. 20	Torero Stadium; San Diego, CA	W 44–21	2,609	
November 4		at Jacksonville	No. 16	D. B. Milne Field; Jacksonville, FL	W 38–21	3,246	
November 11		Dayton	No. 15	Torero Stadium; San Diego, CA	W 56–14	7,323	
November 25	1:05 p.m.	at UC Davis*	No. 16	Toomey Field; Davis, CA	L 27–37	6,555	
December 2	9:00 a.m.	at Monmouth*	No. 16	Kessler Stadium; West Long Branch, NJ (Gridiron Classic)	W 27–7	4,032	
*Non-conference game; Rankings from Coaches' Poll released prior to the game; All times are in Pacific time
