= 2006 North Dakota State Bison football team =

American college football season

2006 North Dakota State Bison football
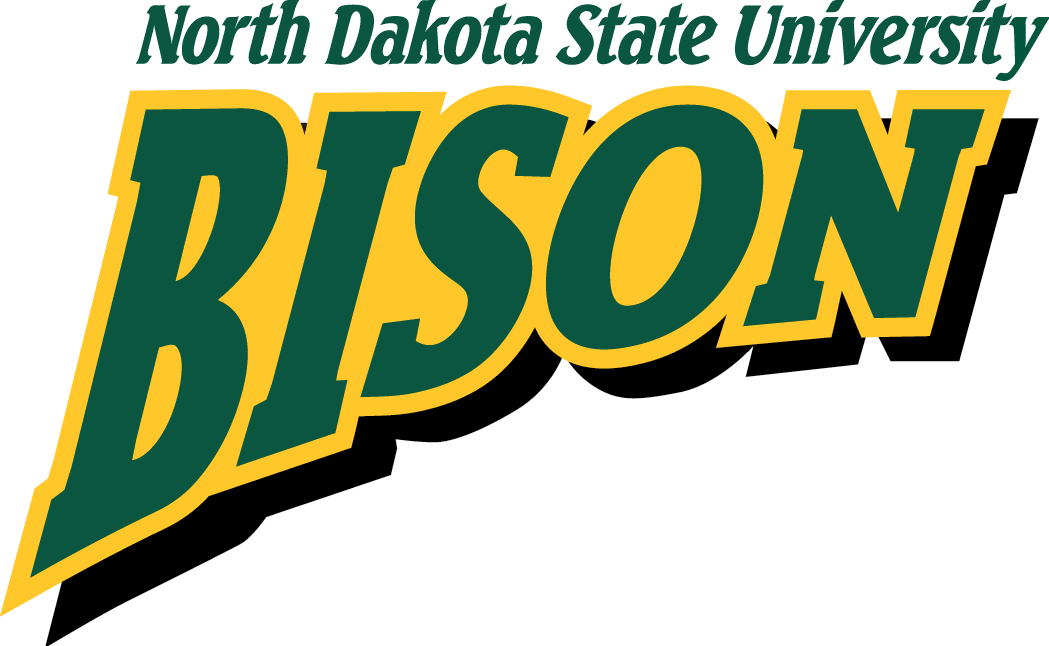
- Conference: Great West Conference

Ranking
- Sports Network: No. 5
- Record: 10–1 (4–0 Great West)
- Head coach: Craig Bohl (4th season)
- Offensive coordinator: Patrick Perles (2nd season)
- Offensive scheme: Pro-style
- Defensive coordinator: Willie Mack Garza (2nd season)
- Base defense: 4–3
- Home stadium: Fargodome

2006 Great West Conference football standings
	Conf.			Overall
Team	W		L	W		L
No. 5 North Dakota State $	4	–	0	10	–	1
No. 22 South Dakota State	3	–	1	7	–	4
No. 16 Cal Poly	2	–	2	7	–	4
UC Davis	1	–	3	6	–	5
Southern Utah	0	–	4	3	–	8
$ – Conference champion; Rankings from The Sports Network poll

The 2006 North Dakota State Bison football team represented North Dakota State University in the 2006 NCAA Division I FCS football season. The Bison head coach is Craig Bohl, in his fourth season as head coach of the team. The Bison play at the Fargodome in Fargo, North Dakota. North Dakota State competes in the FCS division of college football. In 2006, the Bison finished with a record of 10–1, and were the conference champions at 4–0. While being ranked #4 at the end of the year, NDSU was ineligible to make the playoffs per NCAA Division I rules which mandates a four-year probationary period for new football programs (NDSU entered DI in 2004).

The 2006 Bison team had a stout defense that held their opponents to 13.4 points per game and were ranked among the top teams to end the year.

== Schedule ==
Date	Time	Opponent	Rank	Site	Result	Attendance	Source
August 31	7:00 pm	Concordia–St. Paul*	No. 19	Fargodome; Fargo, ND	W 66–7	15,609	
September 16	6:15 pm	Northeastern*	No. 17	Fargodome; Fargo, ND (Trees Bowl)	W 23–10	16,134	
September 22	6:30 pm	at Ball State*	No. 14	Scheumann Stadium; Muncie, IN	W 29–24	10,285	
September 30	6:00 pm	at Stephen F. Austin*	No. 11	Homer Bryce Stadium; Nacogdoches, TX	W 17–9	7,349	
October 7	1:00 pm	No. 21 Georgia Southern*	No. 11	Paulson Stadium; Statesboro, GA	W 34–14	13,892	
October 14	1:00 pm	Mississippi Valley State*^{†}	No. 9	Fargodome; Fargo, ND	W 45–0	16,384	
October 21	2:30 pm	at Minnesota*	No. 9	Metrodome; Minneapolis, MN	L 9–10	62,845	
October 28	1:00 pm	at Southern Utah	No. 6	Eccles Coliseum; Cedar City, UT	W 31–7	3,165	
November 4	3:05 pm	at UC Davis	No. 5	Toomey Field; Davis, CA	W 28–24	5,800	
November 11	1:00 pm	No. 9 Cal Poly	No. 5	Fargodome; Fargo, ND (Harvest Bowl)	W 51–14	14,706	
November 18	6:00 pm	No. 19 South Dakota State	No. 4	Fargodome; Fargo, ND (Dakota Marker)	W 41–28	19,053	
*Non-conference game; ^{†}Homecoming; Rankings from The Sports Network Poll released prior to the game; All times are in Central time
