= 2006 Hampton Pirates football team =

American college football season

2006 Hampton Pirates football
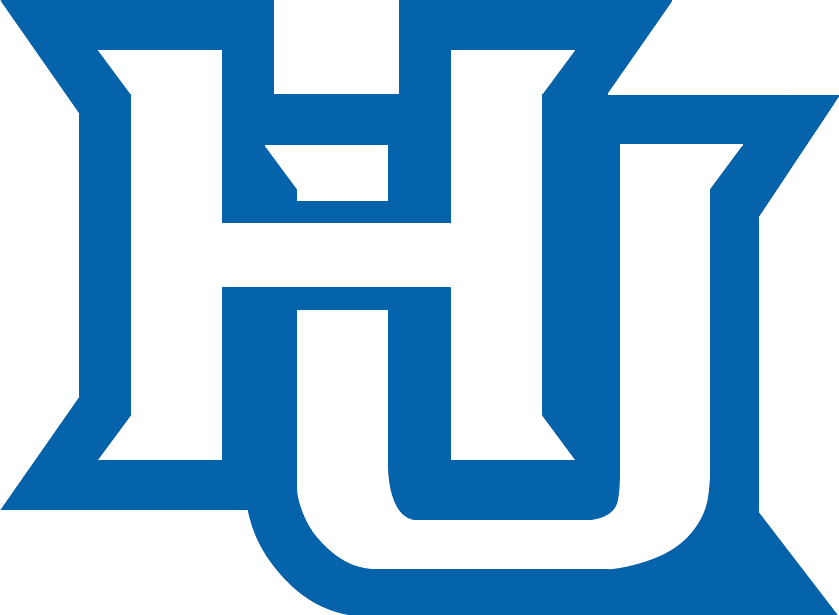

Black college national champion MEAC champion

NCAA Division I First Round, L 38–41 vs. New Hampshire
- Conference: Mid-Eastern Athletic Conference

Ranking
- Sports Network: No. 11
- Record: 10–2 (7–1 MEAC)
- Head coach: Joe Taylor (15th season)
- Home stadium: Armstrong Stadium

2006 Mid-Eastern Athletic Conference football standings
	Conf.			Overall
Team	W		L	W		L
No. 11 Hampton $^	7	–	1	10	–	2
Delaware State	6	–	2	8	–	3
South Carolina State	6	–	2	7	–	4
Florida A&M	5	–	3	7	–	4
Howard	4	–	4	5	–	6
Morgan State	4	–	4	5	–	6
Bethune–Cookman	3	–	5	5	–	6
Norfolk State	1	–	7	4	–	7
North Carolina A&T	0	–	8	0	–	11
$ – Conference champion; ^ – FCS playoff participant; Rankings from The Sports Network poll

The 2006 Hampton Pirates football team represented Hampton University as a member of the Mid-Eastern Athletic Conference (MEAC) in the 2006 NCAA Division I FCS football season. They were led by fifteenth-year head coach Joe Taylor and played their home games at Armstrong Stadium. They finished the season with a 10–2 overall record, won the MEAC championship with a 7–1 record in conference play and earned a berth to the first round of the NCAA Division I playoffs, where they were defeated by New Hampshire.

Hampton won the black college football national championship as awarded by three selectors, with North Carolina Central chosen by five other selectors.

== Schedule ==
Date	Time	Opponent	Rank	Site	Result	Attendance	Source
September 2	11:00 a.m.	vs. No. 23 Grambling State*	No. 13	Legion Field; Birmingham, AL (MEAC/SWAC Challenge)	W 27–26	19,175	
September 9	6:00 p.m.	Howard	No. 14	Armstrong Stadium; Hampton, VA (The Real HU)	W 46–7	12,188	
September 16	1:30 p.m.	North Carolina A&T	No. 10	Armstrong Stadium; Hampton, VA	W 48–14	5,180	
September 23	4:00 p.m.	vs. Morgan State	No. 11	Giants Stadium; East Rutherford, NJ (New York Urban League Football Classic)	W 26–7	53,588	
September 30	7:00 p.m.	at Delaware State	No. 12	Alumni Stadium; Dover, DE	W 29–14	5,449	
October 7	4:00 p.m.	vs. Central State (OH)*	No. 12	RCA Dome; Indianapolis, IN (Circle City Classic)	W 42–12	31,597	
October 14	1:30 p.m.	Norfolk State	No. 12	Armstrong Stadium; Hampton, VA (rivalry)	W 42–13	18,157	
October 21	1:30 p.m.	at South Carolina State	No. 11	Oliver C. Dawson Stadium; Orangeburg, SC	L 6–13	9,090	
October 28	2:00 p.m.	Winston–Salem State*^{†}	No. 17	Armstrong Stadium; Hampton, VA	W 13–3	17,523	
November 2	7:30 p.m.	Bethune–Cookman	No. 13	Armstrong Stadium; Hampton, VA	W 34–17	4,129	
November 11	6:00 p.m.	at Florida A&M	No. 11	Bragg Memorial Stadium; Tallahassee, FL	W 59–7	13,722	
November 25	1:00 p.m.	No. 9 New Hampshire*	No. 8	Armstrong Stadium; Hampton, VA (NCAA Division I First Round)	L 38–41	3,401	
*Non-conference game; ^{†}Homecoming; Rankings from The Sports Network Poll released prior to the game; All times are in Eastern time
