= 2006 Cal Poly Mustangs football team =

American college football season

2006 Cal Poly Mustangs football
- Conference: Great West Conference

Ranking
- Sports Network: No. 16
- Record: 7–4 (2–2 GWC)
- Head coach: Rich Ellerson (6th season)
- Offensive coordinator: Joe DuPaix (3rd season)
- Offensive scheme: Triple option
- Base defense: 4–3
- Home stadium: Mustang Stadium

2006 Great West Conference football standings
	Conf.			Overall
Team	W		L	W		L
No. 5 North Dakota State $	4	–	0	10	–	1
No. 22 South Dakota State	3	–	1	7	–	4
No. 16 Cal Poly	2	–	2	7	–	4
UC Davis	1	–	3	6	–	5
Southern Utah	0	–	4	3	–	8
$ – Conference champion; Rankings from The Sports Network poll

The 2006 Cal Poly Mustangs football team represented California Polytechnic State University, San Luis Obispo as member of the Great West Conference (GWC) during the 2006 NCAA Division I FCS football season. Led by sixth-year head coach Rich Ellerson, Cal Poly compiled an overall record of 7–4 with a mark of 2–2 in conference play, placing third in the GWC. The team outscored its opponents 248 to 162 for the season. The Mustangs played home games at Mustang Stadium in San Luis Obispo, California.

== Schedule ==
Date	Opponent	Rank	Site	Result	Attendance	Source
September 2	Fort Lewis*	No. 6	Mustang Stadium; San Luis Obispo, CA	W 44–0		
September 9	at Weber State*	No. 5	Wildcat Stadium; Ogden, UT	W 17–0	8,519	
September 16	at Sacramento State*	No. 3	Hornet Stadium; Sacramento, CA	W 17–10	8,143	
September 23	at San Jose State*	No. 3	Spartan Stadium; San Jose, CA	L 7–17	15,684	
September 30	Southern Utah	No. 5	Mustang Stadium; San Luis Obispo, CA	W 18–14		
October 7	No. 16 UC Davis	No. 5	Mustang Stadium; San Luis Obispo, CA (Battle for the Golden Horseshoe)	W 23–17	8,435	
October 21	South Dakota State	No. 4	Mustang Stadium; San Luis Obispo, CA	L 28–29		
October 28	at San Diego State*	No. 9	Qualcomm Stadium; San Diego, CA	W 16–14	20,974	
November 4	at No. 2 Montana*	No. 6	Washington–Grizzly Stadium; Missoula, MT	L 9–10	22,853	
November 11	at No. 5 North Dakota State	No. 9	Fargodome; Fargo, ND	L 14–51	14,706	
November 18	Savannah State*	No. 16	Mustang Stadium; San Luis Obispo, CA	W 55–0	11,075	
*Non-conference game; Rankings from The Sports Network Poll released prior to the game

== Team players in the NFL ==
The following Cal Poly Mustang players were selected in the 2007 NFL draft.

Player	Position	Round	Overall	NFL team
Courtney Brown	Defensive back	7	212	Dallas Cowboys
