= 2006 Eastern Illinois Panthers football team =

American college football season

2006 Eastern Illinois Panthers football

OVC co-champion

NCAA Division I First Round, L 13–24 vs. Illinois State
- Conference: Ohio Valley Conference

Ranking
- Sports Network: No. 15
- Record: 8–5 (7–1 OVC)
- Head coach: Mark Hutson (1st season)
- Home stadium: O'Brien Field

2006 Ohio Valley Conference football standings
	Conf.			Overall
Team	W		L	W		L
No. 15 Eastern Illinois +^	7	–	1	8	–	5
No. 13 Tennessee–Martin +^	6	–	1	9	–	3
Tennessee State	5	–	2	6	–	5
Jacksonville State	5	–	3	6	–	5
Eastern Kentucky	5	–	3	6	–	5
Tennessee Tech	4	–	4	4	–	7
Southeast Missouri State	2	–	6	4	–	7
Samford	1	–	7	3	–	8
Murray State	0	–	8	1	–	10
+ – Conference co-champions; ^ – FCS playoff participant; Rankings from The Sports Network poll

The 2006 Eastern Illinois Panthers football team represented Eastern Illinois University as a member of the Ohio Valley Conference (OVC) during the 2006 NCAA Division I FCS football season. The team was led by interim head coach Mark Hutson, as head coach Bob Spoo was unable to coach for medical reasons, and played their home games at O'Brien Field in Charleston, Illinois. The Panthers finished the season with an 8–5 record overall and a 7–1 mark in conference play, sharing the OVC title with Tennessee–Martin. The team received an at-large bid to the NCAA Division I Football Championship playoffs, where they lost to Illinois State in the first round. Eastern Illinois was ranked No. 15 in The Sports Network's postseason ranking of NCAA Division I FCS teams.

== Schedule ==
Date	Opponent	Rank	Site	Result	Attendance	Source
September 2	at Illinois*	No. 14	Memorial Stadium; Champaign, IL	L 17–42	45,444	
September 9	Indiana State*	No. 20	O'Brien Field; Charleston, IL	W 31–21	7,517	
September 16	at Illinois State*	No. 18	Hancock Stadium; Normal, IL (rivalry)	L 30–44	12,512	
September 23	at Samford	No. 20	Seibert Stadium; Homewood, AL	W 24–13	5,355	
September 30	at Hawaii*	No. 20	Aloha Stadium; Honolulu, HI	L 9–44	29,358	
October 7	Southeast Missouri State	No. 20	O'Brien Field; Charleston, IL	W 21–0	10,215	
October 14	at Eastern Kentucky	No. 16	Roy Kidd Stadium; Richmond, KY	W 28–21	10,100	
October 21	Murray State	No. 17	O'Brien Field; Charleston, IL	W 20–10	9,422	
October 28	at No. 12 Tennessee–Martin	No. 14	Graham Stadium; Martin, TN	L 9–15	6,935	
November 4	Tennessee State	No. 20	O'Brien Field; Charleston, IL	W 29–3	5,912	
November 11	at Tennessee Tech	No. 20	Tucker Stadium; Cookeville, TN	W 38–14	2,268	
November 18	Jacksonville State	No. 17	O'Brien Field; Charleston, IL	W 28–24	1,224	
November 25	No. 11 Illinois State*	No. 14	O'Brien Field; Charleston, IL (NCAA Division I First Round)	L 13–24	4,400	
*Non-conference game; Rankings from The Sports Network Poll released prior to the game
