= 2006 UC Davis Aggies football team =

American college football season

2006 UC Davis Aggies football
- Conference: Great West Conference
- Record: 6–5 (1–3 GWC)
- Head coach: Bob Biggs (14th season)
- Offensive coordinator: Mike Moroski (14th season)
- Home stadium: Toomey Field

2006 Great West Conference football standings
	Conf.			Overall
Team	W		L	W		L
No. 5 North Dakota State $	4	–	0	10	–	1
No. 22 South Dakota State	3	–	1	7	–	4
No. 16 Cal Poly	2	–	2	7	–	4
UC Davis	1	–	3	6	–	5
Southern Utah	0	–	4	3	–	8
$ – Conference champion; Rankings from The Sports Network poll

The 2006 UC Davis football team represented the University of California, Davis as a member of the Great West Conference (GWC) during the 2006 NCAA Division I FCS football season. Led by 15th-year head coach Bob Biggs, UC Davis compiled an overall record of 6–5 with a mark of 1–3 in conference play, placing fourth in the GWC. 2006 was the 37th consecutive winning season for the Aggies. The team outscored their opponents 309 to 227 for the season. The Aggies played home games at Toomey Field in Davis, California.

== Schedule ==
Date	Time	Opponent	Rank	Site	Result	Attendance	Source
September 2	12:35 p.m.	at Northern Colorado*	No. 21	Nottingham Field; Greeley, CO	W 38–7	6,072	
September 9	4:00 p.m.	at No. 23 (FBS) TCU*	No. 19	Amon G. Carter Stadium; Fort Worth, TX	L 13–46	25,272	
September 16	12:05 p.m.	at No. 20 Montana State*	No. 21	Bobcat Stadium; Bozeman, MT	W 45–0	12,087	
September 23	3:00 p.m.	at No. 8 Youngstown State*	No. 16	Stambaugh Stadium; Youngstown, OH	L 24–38	16,155	
October 7	6:00 p.m.	at No. 5 Cal Poly	No. 16	Alex G. Spanos Stadium; San Luis Obispo, CA (Battle for the Golden Horseshoe)	L 17–23	8,435	
October 14	1:05 p.m.	Central Arkansas*	No. 18	Toomey Field; Davis, CA	W 33–13	7,100	
October 21	1:05 p.m.	Southern Utah^{†}	No. 18	Toomey Field; Davis, CA	W 27–7	7,805	
October 28	12:00 p.m.	at South Dakota State	No. 16	Coughlin–Alumni Stadium; Brookings, SD	L 21–22	15,248	
November 4	1:05 p.m.	No. 5 North Dakota State		Toomey Field; Davis, CA	L 24–28	5,800	
November 18	1:05 p.m.	Sacramento State*		Toomey Field; Davis, CA (Causeway Classic)	W 30–16	7,905	
November 25	1:05 p.m.	No. 16 San Diego*		Toomey Field; Davis, CA	W 37–27	6,555	
*Non-conference game; ^{†}Homecoming; Rankings from The Sports Network Poll released prior to the game; All times are in Pacific time
