= 2006 Montana Grizzlies football team =

American college football season

2006 Montana Grizzlies football

Big Sky champion

NCAA Division I-AA Semifinal, L 17–19 vs. UMass
- Conference: Big Sky Conference

Ranking
- Sports Network: No. 3
- Record: 12–2 (8–0 Big Sky)
- Head coach: Bobby Hauck (4th season)
- Offensive coordinator: Rob Phenicie (4th season)
- Defensive coordinator: Kraig Paulson (3rd season)
- Home stadium: Washington–Grizzly Stadium

2006 Big Sky Conference football standings
	Conf.			Overall
Team	W		L	W		L
No. 3 Montana $^	8	–	0	12	–	2
No. 10 Montana State ^	6	–	2	8	–	5
No. 19 Portland State	6	–	2	7	–	4
Northern Arizona	5	–	3	6	–	5
Sacramento State	4	–	4	4	–	7
Weber State	3	–	5	4	–	7
Eastern Washington	3	–	5	3	–	8
Idaho State	1	–	7	2	–	9
Northern Colorado	0	–	8	1	–	10
$ – Conference champion; ^ – FCS playoff participant; Rankings from The Sports Network poll

The 2006 Montana Grizzlies football team represented the University of Montana as a member of the Big Sky Conference during the 2006 NCAA Division I FCS football season. Led by fourth-year head coach Bobby Hauck, the Grizzlies compiled an overall record of 12–2, with a mark of 8–0 in conference play, and finished as Big Sky champion. Montana advanced to the NCAA Division I-AA Football Championship playoffs, where the Grizzlies defeated McNeese State in the first round, Southern Illinois in the quarterfinal, and lost to UMass in the semifinal. The team played home games at Washington–Grizzly Stadium in Missoula, Montana.

== Schedule ==
Date	Time	Opponent	Rank	Site	TV	Result	Attendance	Source
September 2	10:00 am	at No. 16 (FBS) Iowa*	No. 3	Kinnick Stadium; Iowa City, IA	ESPNU	L 7–41	70,585	
September 9	1:00 pm	South Dakota State*	No. 6	Washington–Grizzly Stadium; Missoula, MT	KPAX	W 36–7	23,438	
September 23	1:00 pm	Sacramento State	No. 5	Washington–Grizzly Stadium; Missoula, MT	KPAX	W 59–14	23,619	
September 30	7:00 pm	at No. 14 Portland State	No. 4	PGE Park; Portland, OR	KPAX	W 26–20	13,156	
October 7	3:00 pm	at Eastern Washington	No. 4	Woodward Field; Cheney, WA (EWU–UM Governors Cup)	KPAX	W 33–17	11,583	
October 14	1:00 pm	Northern Arizona	No. 3	Washington–Grizzly Stadium; Missoula, MT	KPAX	W 24–21	23,626	
October 21	1:00 pm	at Weber State	No. 2	Stewart Stadium; Ogden, UT	KPAX	W 33–30	5,424	
October 28	1:00 pm	Idaho State	No. 2	Washington–Grizzly Stadium; Missoula, MT	KPAX	W 23–10	23,435	
November 4	12:00 pm	No. 6 Cal Poly*	No. 2	Washington–Grizzly Stadium; Missoula, MT	KPAX	W 10–9	22,853	
November 11	12:00 pm	at Northern Colorado	No. 2	Nottingham Field; Greeley, CO	KPAX	W 53–21	4,632	
November 18	12:30 pm	No. 15 Montana State	No. 2	Washington–Grizzly Stadium; Missoula, MT (rivalry)	KPAX	W 13–7	24,018	
November 25	12:00 pm	No. 22 McNeese State*	No. 2	Washington–Grizzly Stadium; Missoula, MT (NCAA Division I First Round)	KPAX	W 31–6	20,077	
December 2	12:30 pm	No. 10 Southern Illinois*	No. 2	Washington–Grizzly Stadium; Missoula, MT (NCAA Division I Quarterfinal)	KPAX	W 20–3	18,883	
December 8	7:30 pm	No. 3 UMass*	No. 2	Washington–Grizzly Stadium; Missoula, MT (NCAA Division I Semifinal)	ESPN2	L 17–19	23,454	
*Non-conference game; Rankings from The Sports Network Poll released prior to the game; All times are in Mountain time
