= 2006 Montana State Bobcats football team =

American college football season

2006 Montana State Bobcats football

NCAA Division I Quarterfinal, L 17–38 at Appalachian State
- Conference: Big Sky Conference

Ranking
- Sports Network: No. 10
- Record: 8–5 (6–2 Big Sky)
- Head coach: Mike Kramer (7th season)
- Home stadium: Bobcat Stadium

2006 Big Sky Conference football standings
	Conf.			Overall
Team	W		L	W		L
No. 3 Montana $^	8	–	0	12	–	2
No. 10 Montana State ^	6	–	2	8	–	5
No. 19 Portland State	6	–	2	7	–	4
Northern Arizona	5	–	3	6	–	5
Sacramento State	4	–	4	4	–	7
Weber State	3	–	5	4	–	7
Eastern Washington	3	–	5	3	–	8
Idaho State	1	–	7	2	–	9
Northern Colorado	0	–	8	1	–	10
$ – Conference champion; ^ – FCS playoff participant; Rankings from The Sports Network poll

The 2006 Montana State Bobcats football team was an American football team that represented Montana State University in the Big Sky Conference (Big Sky) during the 2006 NCAA Division I FCS football season. In their seventh and final season under head coach Mike Kramer, the Bobcats compiled an 8–5 record (6–2 against Big Sky opponents), tied for second place in the Big Sky, and were ranked No. 10 in the NCAA Division FCS rankings.

After opening the season with an upset victory over Colorado of the NCAA Division I Football Bowl Subdivision (FBS), the Bobcats lost their next three games. They advanced to the NCAA Division I Football Championship playoffs, where they defeated Furman in the first round before losing to Appalachian State in the quarterfinals.

== Schedule ==
Date	Time	Opponent	Rank	Site	TV	Result	Attendance	Source
September 2	1:30 p.m.	at Colorado*	No. 22	Folsom Field; Boulder, CO		W 19–10	45,513	
September 9	1:05 p.m.	Chadron State*	No. 11	Bobcat Stadium; Bozeman, MT		L 24–35	13,827	
September 16	1:05 p.m.	No. 21 UC Davis*	No. 20	Bobcat Stadium; Bozeman, MT		L 0–45	12,087	
September 23	1:05 p.m.	Eastern Washington		Bobcat Stadium; Bozeman, MT		L 10–19	12,847	
September 30	3:05 p.m.	at Northern Arizona		Walkup Skydome; Flagstaff, AZ		W 39–32	8,173	
October 7	1:35 p.m.	No. 15 Portland State		Bobcat Stadium; Bozeman, MT		W 14–0	14,117	
October 14	6:05 p.m.	at Sacramento State		Hornet Stadium; Sacramento, CA		W 21–18	5,260	
October 21	1:35 p.m.	at Idaho State		Holt Arena; Pocatello, ID		W 42–35	7,773	
October 28	1:35 p.m.	Weber State	No. 24	Bobcat Stadium; Bozeman, MT		W 24–18	10,127	
November 4	12:05 p.m.	Northern Colorado	No. 19	Bobcat Stadium; Bozeman, MT		W 13–10	13,177	
November 18	12:37 p.m.	at No. 2 Montana	No. 15	Washington–Grizzly Stadium; Missoula, MT (rivalry)	KPAX	L 7–13	24,018	
November 25	11:30 a.m.	No. 7 Furman*	No. 18	Bobcat Stadium; Bozeman, MT (NCAA Division I First Round)		W 31–13	9,427	
December 2	2:00 p.m.	at No. 1 Appalachian State*	No. 18	Kidd Brewer Stadium; Boone, NC (NCAA Division I Quarterfinal)	ESPN2	L 17–38	15,116	
*Non-conference game; Rankings from The Sports Network Poll released prior to the game; All times are in Mountain time
