= 2006 Albany Great Danes football team =

American college football season

2006 Albany Great Danes football
- Conference: Northeast Conference
- Record: 7–4 (5–2 NEC)
- Head coach: Bob Ford (37th season)
- Offensive coordinator: Peter Rossomando (2nd season)
- Defensive coordinator: Mike Simpson (20th season)
- Home stadium: University Field

2006 Northeast Conference football standings
| | Conf. | | | Overall |
| Team | W | | L | W | | L |
|---|---|---|---|---|---|---|
| Monmouth $ | 6 | – | 1 | 10 | – | 2 |
| Albany | 5 | – | 2 | 7 | – | 4 |
| Robert Morris | 5 | – | 2 | 7 | – | 4 |
| Stony Brook | 5 | – | 2 | 5 | – | 6 |
| Central Connecticut State | 4 | – | 3 | 8 | – | 3 |
| Saint Francis (PA) | 2 | – | 5 | 3 | – | 8 |
| Sacred Heart | 1 | – | 6 | 2 | – | 9 |
| Wagner | 0 | – | 7 | 4 | – | 7 |
$ – Conference champion

The 2006 Albany Great Danes football team represented the University at Albany, SUNY as a member of the Northeast Conference (NEC) during the 2006 NCAA Division I FCS football season. Led by 37-year head coach Bob Ford, the Great Danes compiled an overall record of 7–4 with a mark of 5–2 in conference play, placing second in the NEC. The team played home games at University Field in Albany New York.

== Schedule ==
| Date | Time | Opponent | Site | Result | Attendance | Source |
|---|---|---|---|---|---|---|
| September 2 | 1:00 pm | at Lehigh* | Goodman Stadium; Bethlehem, PA | W 17–16 | 1,812 | |
| September 9 | 6:00 pm | Fordham* | University Field; Albany, NY | L 7–9 | 5,207 | |
| September 16 | 7:00 pm | at No. 11 Delaware* | Delaware Stadium; Newark, DE | W 17–10 | 22,016 | |
| September 23 | | No. 23 Central Connecticut | University Field; Albany, NY | W 19–14 | | |
| September 30 | 7:00 pm | at Cornell* | Schoellkopf Field; Ithaca, NY | L 21–23 | 6,571 | |
| October 7 | 2:00 pm | at Stony Brook | Kenneth P. LaValle Stadium; Stony Brook, NY (rivalry) | L 21–33 | 6,688 | |
| October 14 | 1:00 pm | at Sacred Heart | Campus Field; Fairfield, CT | W 24–13 | | |
| October 21 | 4:00 pm | Saint Francis (PA)^{†} | University Field; Albany, NY | W 48–0 | 5,964 | |
| October 28 | 4:00 pm | Wagner | University Field; Albany, NY | W 34–0 | 620 | |
| November 4 | 1:00 pm | at Robert Morris | Joe Walton Stadium; Moon Township, PA | W 16–6 | 2,148 | |
| November 11 | 1:00 pm | Monmouth | University Field; Albany, NY | L 0–19 | 1,359 | |
*Non-conference game; ^{†}Homecoming; Rankings from The Sports Network Poll released prior to the game; All times are in Eastern time
