= 2006 NCAA Division I FCS football rankings =

The 2006 NCAA Division I FCS football rankings are from the Sports Network Division media poll.

== Legend ==
	Increase in ranking
	Decrease in ranking
	Not ranked previous week
(#–#)	Win–loss record
(Italics)	Number of first place votes
т	Tied with team above or below also with this symbol

== The Sports Network poll ==
	Preseason	Week 1 Sept 6	Week 2 Sept 13	Week 3 Sept 20	Week 4 Sept 27	Week 5 Oct 4	Week 6 Oct 11	Week 7 Oct 18	Week 8 Oct 25	Week 9 Nov 1	Week 10 Nov 8	Week 11 Nov 15	Week 12 Nov 22	Week 13 Postseason	
1.	Appalachian State (68)	Appalachian State (0–1) (43)	New Hampshire (1–0) (56)	New Hampshire (2–0) (83)	New Hampshire (3–0) (80)	New Hampshire (4–0) (81)	New Hampshire (5–0) (88)	Appalachian State (6–1) (88)	Appalachian State (7–1) (82)	Appalachian State (8–1) (96)	Appalachian State (9–1) (94)	Appalachian State (10–1) (84)	Appalachian State (10–1) (73)	Appalachian State (14–1) (69)	1.
2.	New Hampshire (14)	New Hampshire (0–0) (31)	Appalachian State (1–1) (42)	Appalachian State (2–1) (22)	Appalachian State (3–1) (22)	Appalachian State (4–1) (21)	Appalachian State (5–1) (21)	Montana (5–1) (2)	Montana (6–1) (4)	Montana (7–1) (1)	Montana (8–1) (2)	Montana (9–1) (2)	Montana (10–1) (1)	UMass (13–2)	2.
3.	Montana (5)	Northern Iowa (1–0) (13)	Cal Poly (2–0) (1)	Cal Poly (3–0) (2)	Furman (3–1)	Furman (4–1)	Montana (4–1)	Illinois State (5–1) (11)	Illinois State (6–1) (12)	UMass (7–1) (3)	UMass (8–1) (4)	UMass (9–1) (4)	UMass (10–1) (2)	Montana (12–2)	3.
4.	Northern Iowa (3)	Furman (1–0) (3)	Furman (2–0)	Furman (2–1)	Montana (2–1)	Montana (3–1)	Cal Poly (5–1)	Cal Poly (5–1) (1)	UMass (6–1) (3)	James Madison (7–1)	James Madison (8–1)	North Dakota State (9–1) (8)	North Dakota State (10–1) (5)	Youngstown State (11–3)	4.
5.	Furman (1)	Cal Poly (1–0) (4)	Montana (1–1)	Montana (1–1)	Cal Poly (3–1)	Cal Poly (4–1)	Illinois State (4–1)	Youngstown State (6–1) (1)	James Madison (6–1)	North Dakota State (7–1) (3)	North Dakota State (8–1) (4)	Youngstown State (8–2)	Youngstown State (9–2)	North Dakota State (10–1) (1)	5.
6.	Cal Poly (3) (Note: In the actual printed polls, Cal Poly was sometimes listed as Cal Poly San Luis Obispo)	Montana (0–1) (2)	Youngstown State (2–0) (1)	Illinois State (2–1)	Illinois State (3–1)	Illinois State (3–1)	Youngstown State (5–1)	UMass (5–1)	North Dakota State (6–1) (3)	Cal Poly (6–2)	Youngstown State (8–2)	Illinois State (8–2)	James Madison (9–2)	New Hampshire (9–4)	6.
7.	Youngstown State	Illinois State (0–1)	Illinois State (1–1)	Richmond (2–0)	Richmond (3–0)	Richmond (4–0)	Southern Illinois (5–0)	New Hampshire (5–1) (1)	Northern Iowa (5–2)	Youngstown State (7–2)	Illinois State (7–2)	James Madison (8–2)	Furman (8–3)	Southern Illinois (9–4)	7.
8.	James Madison	Youngstown State (1–0) (1)	Richmond (1–0)	Youngstown State (2–1)	Youngstown State (3–1)	Youngstown State (4–1)	UMass (4–1)	James Madison (5–1)	Furman (6–2)	Illinois State (6–2)	Tennessee–Martin (8–1)	Furman (8–3)	Hampton (10–1)	Illinois State (9–4)	8.
9.	Illinois State	UMass (1–0)	UMass (1–1)	UMass (2–1)	UMass (3–1)	Southern Illinois (4–0) (1)	North Dakota State (5–0)	North Dakota State (6–0) (2)	Cal Poly (5–2)	New Hampshire (6–2)	Cal Poly (6–3)	Hampton (10–1)	New Hampshire (8–3)	James Madison (9–3)	9.
10.	UMass (Note: In the actual printed polls, UMass was listed as Massachusetts)	Richmond (1–0) (2)	Hampton (2–0)	Southern Illinois (2–0) (2)	Southern Illinois (3–0) (1)	UMass (3–1)	Richmond (4–1)	Richmond (5–1)	Youngstown State (6–2)	Tennessee–Martin (7–1)	Furman (7–3)	New Hampshire (7–3)	Southern Illinois (8–3)	Montana State (8–5)	10.
11.	McNeese State	Montana State (1–0) (7)	Delaware (1–0)	Hampton (3–0) (1)	North Dakota State (3–0)	North Dakota State (4–0)	Furman (4–2)	Hampton (7–0) (3)	New Hampshire (5–2)	Furman (6–3)	Hampton (9–1)	Southern Illinois (7–3)	Illinois State (8–3)	Hampton (10–2)	11.
12.	Georgia Southern	James Madison (1–0)	Northern Iowa (1–1)	Northern Iowa (2–1)	Hampton (4–0)	Hampton (5–0)	Hampton (6–0)	Furman (5–2)	Tennessee–Martin (6–1)	Southern Illinois (6–2)	Northern Iowa (6–3)	Tennessee–Martin (8–2)	Tennessee–Martin (9–2)	Furman (8–4)	12.
13.	Hampton	Georgia Southern (0–0)	Portland State (2–0) (3)	McNeese State (1–1)	Northern Iowa (2–1)	James Madison (3–1)	James Madison (4–1)	Southern Illinois (5–1)	Richmond (5–2)	Hampton (8–1)	New Hampshire (6–3)	Coastal Carolina (8–2)	Coastal Carolina (9–2)	Tennessee–Martin (9–3)	13.
14.	Eastern Illinois	Hampton (1–0)	McNeese State (1–1)	North Dakota State (2–0)	Portland State (3–1)	Northern Iowa (2–2)	Northern Iowa (3–2)	Northern Iowa (4–2)	Eastern Illinois (5–3)	Northern Iowa (5–3)	Southern Illinois (6–3)	San Diego (10–0)	Eastern Illinois (8–4)	Coastal Carolina (9–3)	14.
15.	Richmond	Delaware (0–0)	James Madison (1–1)	Portland State (2–1)	James Madison (2–1)	Portland State (3–2)	Harvard (4–0)	Harvard (5–0)	Maine (5–2)	Richmond (5–3)	San Diego (9–0)	Montana State (7–3)	Cal Poly (7–4)	Eastern Illinois (8–5)	15.
16.	Delaware	McNeese State (0–1)	Southern Illinois (1–0)	UC Davis (2–1)	McNeese State (1–2)	UC Davis (2–2)	Eastern Illinois (3–3)	Tennessee–Martin (5–1)	UC Davis (4–3)	San Diego (8–0)	Coastal Carolina (7–2)	Cal Poly (6–4)	San Diego (10–0)	Cal Poly (7–4)	16.
17.	Southern Illinois	Southern Illinois (1–0)	North Dakota State (1–0)	James Madison (1–1)	Delaware (2–1)	Towson State (4–0)	Tennessee–Martin (5–1)	Eastern Illinois (4–3)	Hampton (7–1)	Coastal Carolina (6–2)	Harvard (7–1)	Eastern Illinois (7–4)	Northern Iowa (7–4)	Northern Iowa (7–4)	17.
18.	Texas State	North Dakota State (1–0)	Eastern Illinois (1–1)	Delaware (1–1)	UC Davis (2–2)	Delaware (2–2)	UC Davis (2–3)	UC Davis (3–3)	Princeton (6–0)	Harvard (6–1)	Montana State (7–3)	Princeton (8–1)	Montana State (7–4)	Princeton (9–1)	18.
19.	North Dakota State	UC Davis (1–0)	Eastern Kentucky (1–1)	Georgia Southern (1–1)	Towson State (4–0)	Harvard (3–0)	Central Connecticut State (5–1)	Maine (4–2)	Southern Illinois (5–2)	Montana State (6–3)	Maine (6–3)	South Dakota State (7–3)	Princeton (9–1)	Portland State (7–4)	19.
20.	Eastern Kentucky	Eastern Illinois (0–1)	Montana State (1–1)	Eastern Illinois (1–2)	Eastern Illinois (2–2)	Eastern Illinois (2–3)	Alabama A&M (4–1)	Alabama A&M (5–1)	San Diego (7–0)	Eastern Illinois (5–4)	Eastern Illinois (6–4)	Northern Iowa (6–4)	Portland State (7–4)	San Diego (11–1)	20.
21.	UC Davis	Portland State (1–0)	UC Davis (1–1)	Towson State (3–0)	Western Illinois (3–1)	Georgia Southern (2–2)	San Diego (5–0)	San Diego (6–0)	Portland State (5–3)	Towson State (6–2)	Princeton (7–1)	Portland State (7–4)	South Dakota State (7–4)	McNeese State (7–5)	21.
22.	Montana State	Texas State (1–0)	Lafayette (2–0)	Western Carolina (2–0)	Harvard (2–0)	Tennessee–Martin (4–1)	Towson State (4–1)	Princeton (5–0)	Coastal Carolina (5–2)	Maine (5–3)	South Dakota State (6–3)	Maine (6–4)	McNeese State (7–4)	South Dakota State (7–4)	22.
23.	Grambling State	Eastern Kentucky (0–1)	Texas State (1–1)	Central Connecticut State (3–0)	Albany State (3–1)	Central Connecticut State (4–1)	Maine (3–2)	Portland State (4–3)	Harvard (5–1)	Princeton (6–1)	Portland State (6–4)	Delaware State (8–2)	Wofford (7–4)	Wofford (7–4)	23.
24.	Nicholls State	Nicholls State (1–0)	Georgia Southern (0–1)	Eastern Kentucky (1–2)	Western Carolina (2–1)	Alabama A&M (3–1)	Princeton (4–0)	Coastal Carolina (5–2)	Montana State (5–3)	South Dakota State (5–3)	Charleston Southern (9–0)	Towson State (7–3)	Maine (6–5)	Central Arkansas (8–3)	24.
25.	Coastal Carolina	Lafayette (1–0)	Alabama A&M (2–0)	Jacksonville State (1–1)	Northern Arizona (2–2)	San Diego (4–0)	Portland State (3–3)	Sam Houston State (4–2)	Delaware (4–3)	Portland State (5–4)	Richmond (5–4)	Alabama A&M (8–2)	Central Arkansas (8–3)	Yale (8–2)	25.
	Preseason	Week 1 Sept 6	Week 2 Sept 13	Week 3 Sept 20	Week 4 Sept 27	Week 5 Oct 4	Week 6 Oct 11	Week 7 Oct 18	Week 8 Oct 25	Week 9 Nov 1	Week 10 Nov 8	Week 11 Nov 15	Week 12 Nov 22	Week 13 Postseason	
		Dropped: 23 Grambling State; 25 Coastal Carolina	Dropped: 24 Nicholls State	Dropped: 20 Montana State; 22 Lafayette; 23 Texas State; 25 Alabama A&M	Dropped: 19 Georgia Southern; 23 Central Connecticut State; 24 Eastern Kentucky; 25 Jacksonville State	Dropped: 16 McNeese State; 21 Western Illinois; 23 Albany State; 24 Western Carolina; 25 Northern Arizona	Dropped: 18 Delaware; 21 Georgia Southern	Dropped: 19 Central Connecticut State; 22 Towson State	Dropped: 20 Alabama A&M; 25 Sam Houston State	Dropped: 16 UC Davis; 25 Delaware	Dropped: 21 Towson State	Dropped: 17 Harvard; 24 Charleston Southern; 25 Richmond	Dropped: 23 Delaware State; 24 Towson State; 25 Alabama A&M	Dropped: 24 Maine	
