= 2006 Elon Phoenix football team =

American college football season

2006 Elon Phoenix football
- Conference: Southern Conference
- Record: 5–6 (2–5 SoCon)
- Head coach: Pete Lembo (1st season)
- Defensive coordinator: Jay Bateman (1st season)
- Home stadium: Rhodes Stadium

2006 Southern Conference football standings
	Conf.			Overall
Team	W		L	W		L
No. 1 Appalachian State $^	7	–	0	14	–	1
No. 12 Furman ^	6	–	1	8	–	4
No. 23 Wofford	5	–	2	7	–	4
The Citadel	4	–	3	5	–	6
Elon	2	–	5	5	–	6
Chattanooga	2	–	5	3	–	8
Georgia Southern	2	–	5	3	–	8
Western Carolina	0	–	7	2	–	9
$ – Conference champion; ^ – FCS playoff participant; Rankings from The Sports Network FCS Poll

The 2006 Elon Phoenix football team was an American football team that represented Elon University as a member of the Southern Conference (SoCon) during the 2006 NCAA Division I FCS football season. Led by first-year head coach Pete Lembo, the Phoenix compiled an overall record of 5–6, with a mark of 2–5 in conference play, and finished tied for fifth in the SoCon.

== Schedule ==
Date	Time	Opponent	Site	Result	Attendance	Source
September 2	7:00 p.m.	at No. 25 Coastal Carolina*	Brooks Stadium; Conway, SC	W 23–20	8,169	
September 9	6:00 p.m.	Towson*	Rhodes Stadium; Elon, NC	L 17–24	7,544	
September 16	2:00 p.m.	Presbyterian*	Rhodes Stadium; Elon, NC	W 28–0	9,542	
September 30	3:30 p.m.	at No. 2 Appalachian State	Kidd Brewer Stadium; Boone, NC	L 21–45	26,620	
October 7	2:00 p.m.	Western Carolina	Rhodes Stadium; Elon, NC	W 37–19	4,374	
October 14	1:00 p.m.	at Georgia Southern	Paulson Stadium; Statesboro, GA	L 21–28	14,825	
October 21	2:00 p.m.	Wofford	Rhodes Stadium; Elon, NC	L 21–35	5,624	
October 28	6:00 p.m.	at Chattanooga	Finley Stadium; Chattanooga, TN	W 20–17	5,626	
November 4	2:00 p.m.	No. 10 Furman	Rhodes Stadium; Elon, NC	L 13–24	9,226	
November 11	1:30 p.m.	at North Carolina A&T*	Aggie Stadium; Greensboro, NC	W 45–0	2,768	
November 18	5:00 p.m.	The Citadel	Rhodes Stadium; Elon, NC	L 7–44	3,716	
*Non-conference game; Rankings from The Sports Network Poll released prior to the game; All times are in Eastern time
