= 2016 Kantoh Collegiate American Football Association Top 8 season =

- Sport: Football
- Duration: September 1, 2016 through December 2016
- Teams: 8

Regular season

Football seasons
- 2015 2017

2016 Kantoh Collegiate American Football Association Top 8 football standings
	Conf.			Overall
Team	W		L	W		L
Chuo	0	–	0	0	–	0
Hosei	0	–	0	0	–	0
Keio	0	–	0	0	–	0
Meiji	0	–	0	0	–	0
Nihon	0	–	0	0	–	0
NSSU	0	–	0	0	–	0
Rikkyo	0	–	0	0	–	0
Waseda	0	–	0	0	–	0
As of April 1, 2016

== Attendance ==
Team	Stadium	Capacity	Game 1	Game 2	Game 3	Game 4	Game 5	Game 6	Game 7	Game 8	Total	Average	% of Capacity
Chuo													
Hosei	Tomahawks Field												
Keio													
Meiji													
Nihon													
NSSU													
Rikkyo													
Waseda													
Total	–	–	–	–	–	–	–	–	–	–	–	–	–

== Head coaches ==
- David Stant, Keio
