= 2006 Charleston Southern Buccaneers football team =

American college football season

2006 Charleston Southern Buccaneers football
- Conference: Big South Conference
- Record: 9–2 (2–2 Big South)
- Head coach: Jay Mills (4th season)
- Offensive coordinator: Jamey Chadwell (3rd season)
- Defensive coordinator: Steve Barrows (4th season)
- Home stadium: Buccaneer Field

2006 Big South Conference football standings
	Conf.			Overall
Team	W		L	W		L
No. 14 Coastal Carolina $^	4	–	0	9	–	3
Charleston Southern	2	–	2	9	–	2
Gardner–Webb	2	–	2	6	–	5
Liberty	2	–	2	6	–	5
VMI	0	–	4	1	–	10
$ – Conference champion; ^ – FCS playoff participant; Rankings from The Sports Network poll

The 2006 Charleston Southern Buccaneers football team represented Charleston Southern University as a member of the Big South Conference during the 2006 NCAA Division I FCS football season. Led by fourth-year head coach Jay Mills, the Buccaneers compiled an overall record of 9–2 with a mark of 2–2 in conference play, placing in a three-way tie for second in the Big South.

== Schedule ==
Date	Time	Opponent	Rank	Site	TV	Result	Attendance	Source
September 2	1:30 pm	at Presbyterian*		Bailey Memorial Stadium; Clinton, SC		W 21–13	4,278	
September 9	7:00 pm	at The Citadel*		Johnson Hagood Stadium; Charleston, SC	BI	W 38–35 ^{2OT}	15,121	
September 16	1:30 pm	Wingate*		Buccaneer Field; Charleston, SC		W 20–17	2,984	
September 30	1:30 pm	North Greenville*		Buccaneer Field; Charleston, SC		W 20–10	3,346	
October 7	1:30 pm	at Savannah State*		Ted Wright Stadium; Savannah, GA		W 38–13	2,777	
October 14	1:30 pm	Edward Waters*		Buccaneer Field; Charleston, SC		W 47–0	2,847	
October 21	1:00 pm	VMI		Buccaneer Field; Charleston, SC		W 27–22	3,258	
October 28	1:30 pm	Georgetown*^{†}		Buccaneer Field; Charleston, SC		W 24–10	3,597	
November 4	1:30 pm	Gardner–Webb		Buccaneer Field; Charleston, SC		W 28–14	3,783	
November 11	1:30 pm	at Liberty	No. 24	Williams Stadium; Lynchburg, VA		L 20–34	10,823	
November 18	12:30 pm	at No. 13 Coastal Carolina		Brooks Stadium; Conway, SC		L 17–31	7,669	
*Non-conference game; ^{†}Homecoming; Rankings from The Sports Network Poll released prior to the game; All times are in Eastern time
