= Rynearson Stadium =

Collegiate sports venue in Ypsilanti, Michigan, United States

- The Factory
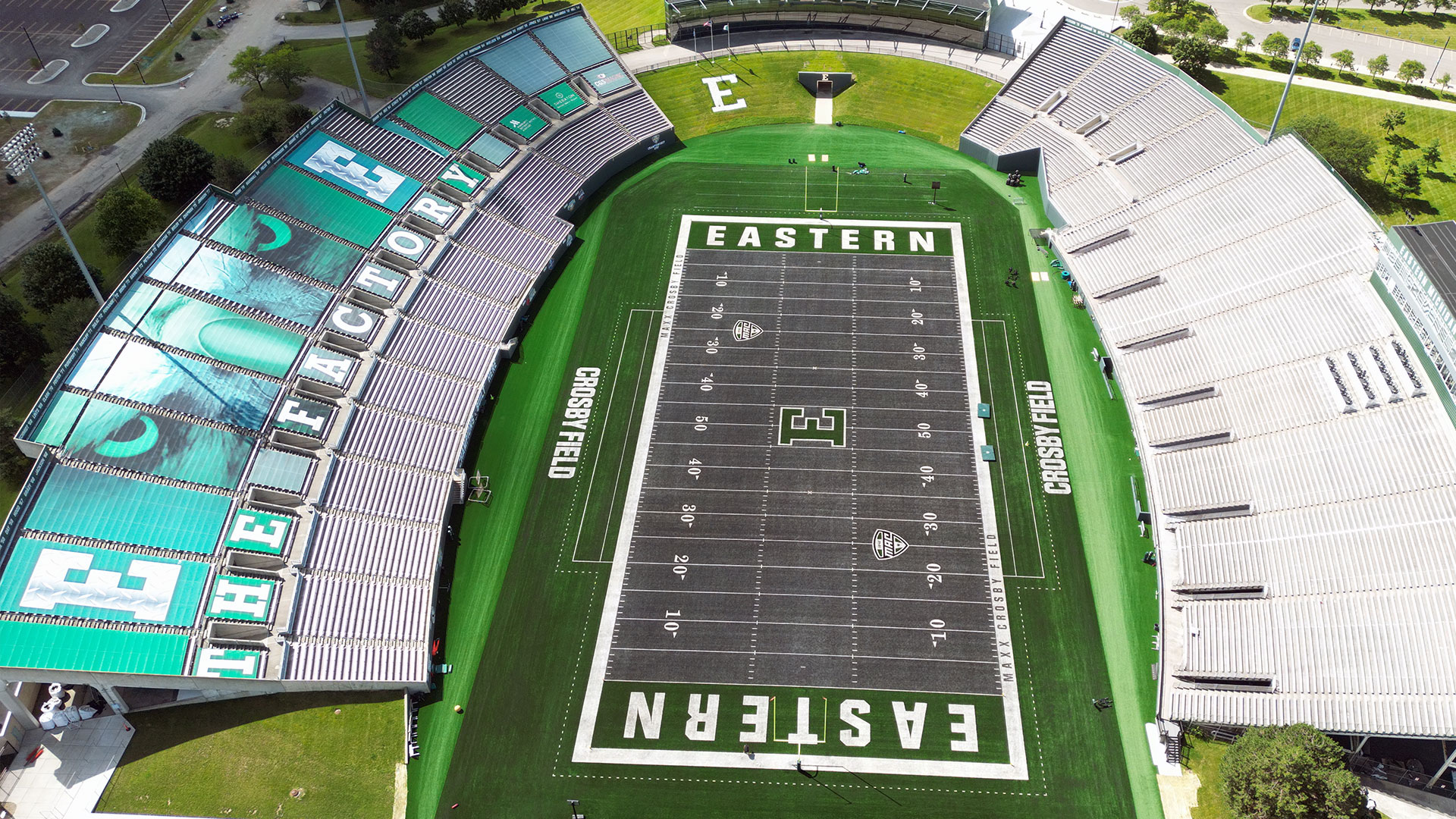
- Rynearson Stadium in 2024

- Location in Michigan Location in the United States
- Location: 799 N. Hewitt Rd; Ypsilanti, MI 48197
- Coordinates: 42°15′21″N 83°38′50″W
- Owner: Eastern Michigan University
- Operator: Eastern Michigan University
- Capacity: 26,188 (2008–present); 22,227 (1974–1991); 15,500 (1969–1973)
- Surface: FieldTurf (gray) (2014–present); FieldTurf (green) (2005–2013); Astroturf (1991–2004); Natural Grass (1969–1990)

Construction
- Groundbreaking: 1968
- Opened: September 27, 1969
- Renovated: 2024
- Expanded: 1974, 1992
- Cost: $1.4 million (approximate) ($12.3 million in 2025 dollars)
- Architect: HNTB (renovations)

Tenants
- Eastern Michigan Eagles (NCAA) (1969–present); Detroit Wheels (WFL) (1974)

Rynearson Stadium, nicknamed "The Factory", is a stadium in Ypsilanti, Michigan. It is primarily used for American football, and is the home field of the Eastern Michigan University Eagles. Currently, the stadium has seating for 30,200 people. The stadium is located on the school's west campus, just south of the Huron River.

== History ==
The stadium held its first game on September 27, 1969, when EMU upset the University of Akron, 10–3. It originally consisted of two opposite sideline stands around the field and running track. It was one of only two stadiums in the MAC which shared its football field with a running track (UB Stadium being the other) prior to the removal of the track as part of stadium renovations in 2024. The stadium was named for the late Elton J. Rynearson Sr., who coached football at Eastern Michigan for 26 seasons. His teams compiled a record of 114–58–15. In one six-year period, from 1925–30, Rynearson’s teams won 40 games, tied two, and lost just four.

The largest attendance for an EMU game at Rynearson Stadium was 26,188 (87% of capacity), on November 28, 2008, for a 56–52 win over Central Michigan.

The stadium has also hosted high school football games.

=== Renovations ===
In 1992, the seats were expanded south from each grandstand but not connected, giving the stadium the look of an unfinished horseshoe. This was done to conform to the new Division I-A rules for minimum stadium size. Originally a grass field, the field has been artificial since 1991 and was upgraded to FieldTurf in 2005. More recently, the original FieldTurf was replaced prior to the 2014 season by a new gray FieldTurf surface. This made Rynearson Stadium only the third Division I FBS stadium with a non-traditional field color (after Albertsons Stadium at Boise State and Brooks Stadium at Coastal Carolina) and the sixth college football stadium overall with this feature. Lighting was added in 1974, partially due to the Detroit Wheels of the World Football League using the stadium as their home field.

In 2024, as part of a $1 million donation by former EMU football player Maxx Crosby and his wife and ex-soccer player Rachel Crosby, the playing field was renamed Crosby Field. Renovations included the installation of new playing surface, as well as the removal of the track surrounding the field and the construction of a new track-only facility to replace it.

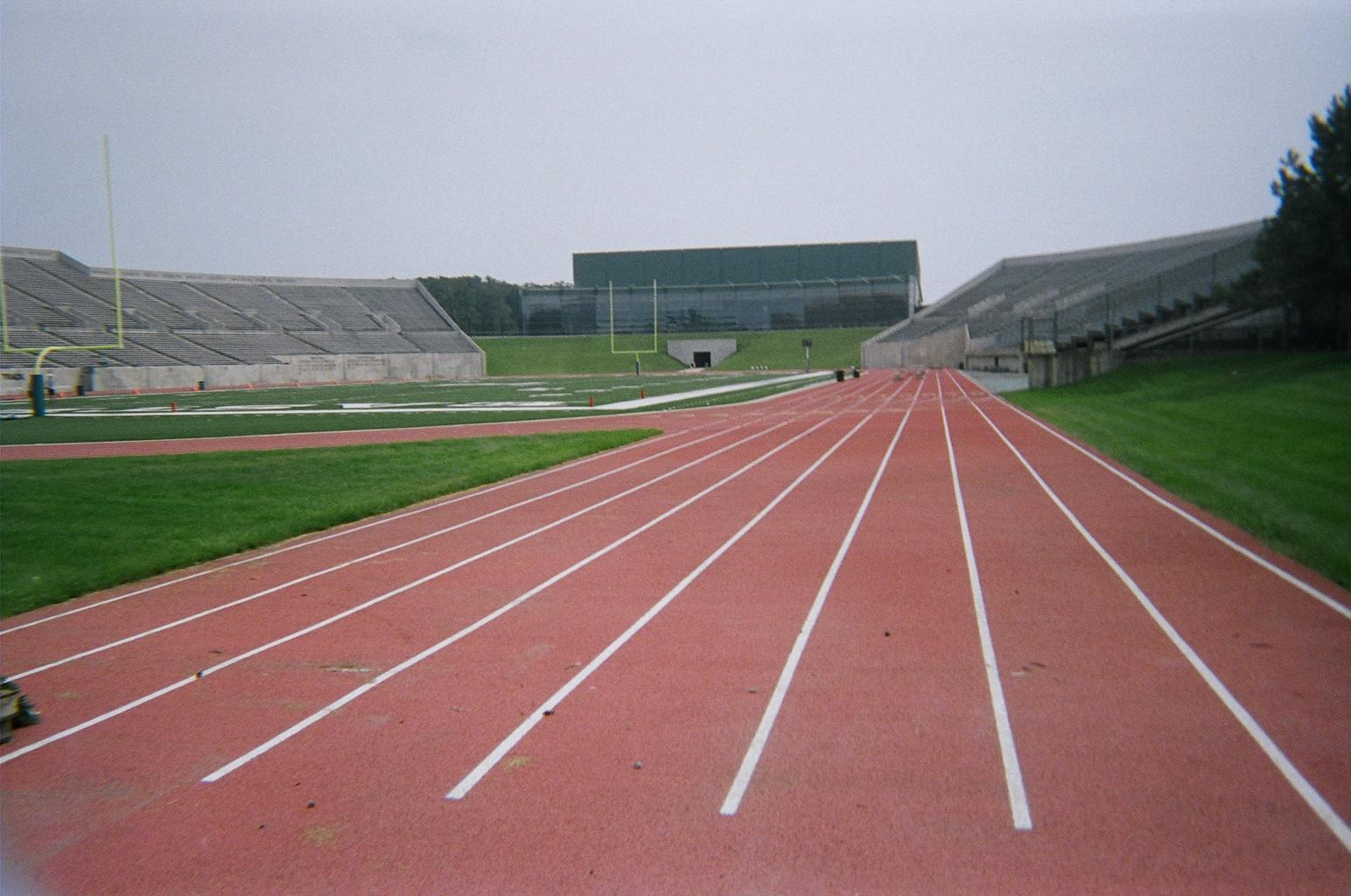
Olds/Marshall Track in Rynearson Stadium, with the George Gervin GameAbove Center in the background

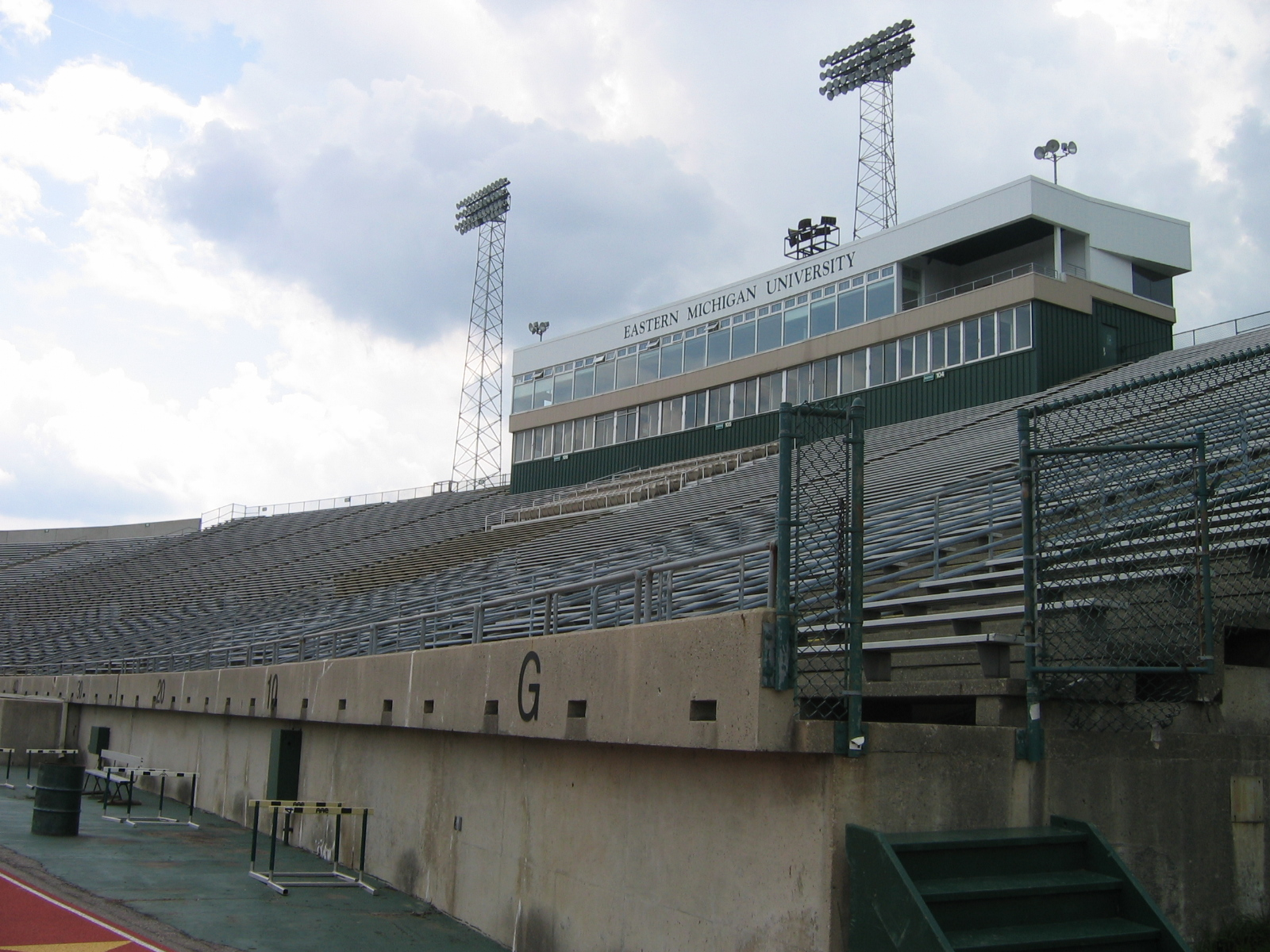
The "home" (west) side of the stadium

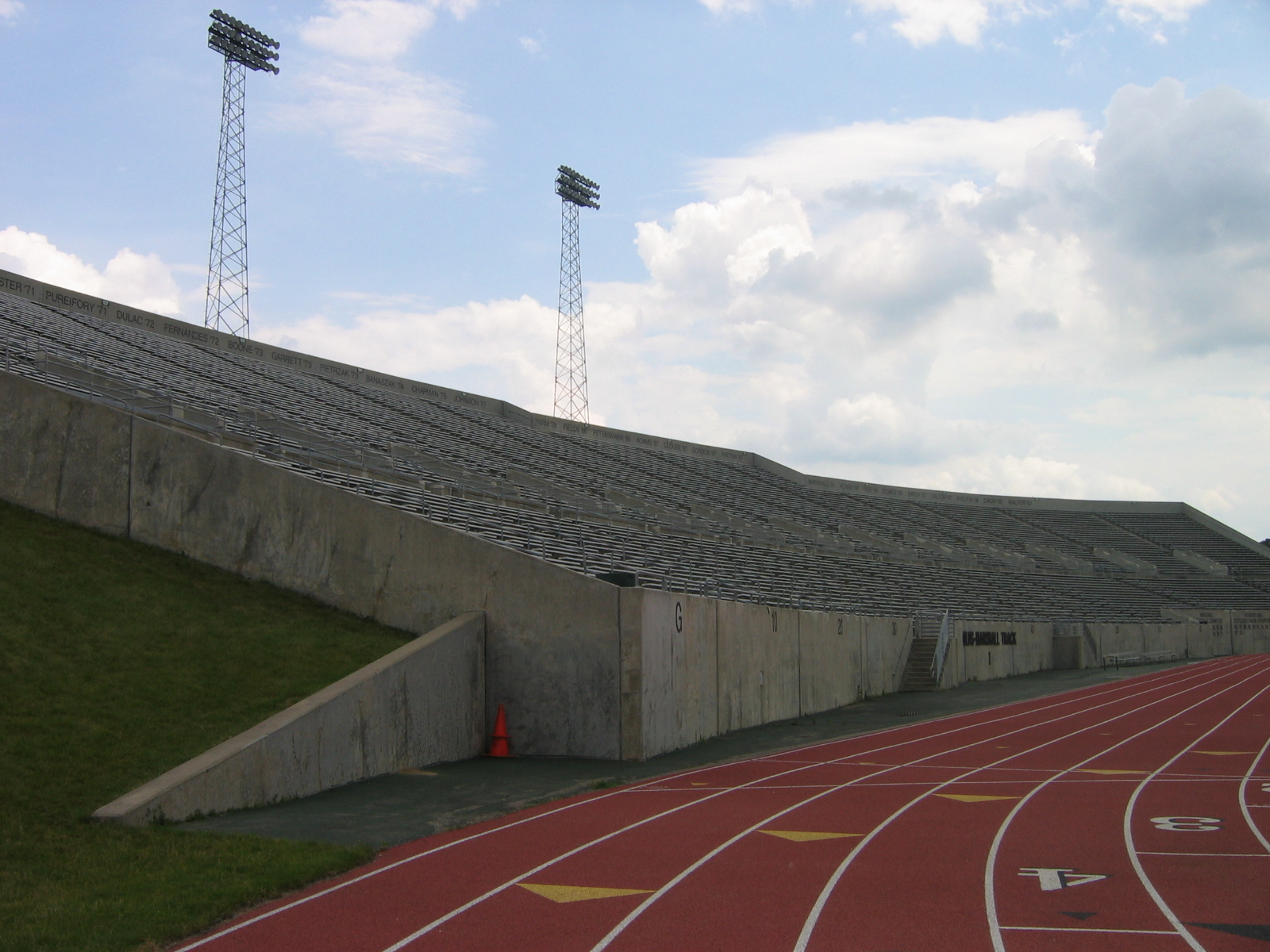
The "away" (east) side of the stadium

== See also ==
- List of NCAA Division I FBS football stadiums
