= 2006 Coastal Carolina Chanticleers football team =

American college football season

2006 Coastal Carolina Chanticleers football

Big South champion

NCAA Division I First Round, L 28–45 at Appalachian State
- Conference: Big South Conference

Ranking
- Sports Network: No. 14
- Record: 9–3 (4–0 Big South)
- Head coach: David Bennett (4th season)
- Offensive coordinator: Jamie Snider (4th season)
- Offensive scheme: Multiple
- Defensive coordinator: Curtis Walker (4th season)
- Base defense: 4–3
- Home stadium: Brooks Stadium

2006 Big South Conference football standings
	Conf.			Overall
Team	W		L	W		L
No. 14 Coastal Carolina $^	4	–	0	9	–	3
Charleston Southern	2	–	2	9	–	2
Gardner–Webb	2	–	2	6	–	5
Liberty	2	–	2	6	–	5
VMI	0	–	4	1	–	10
$ – Conference champion; ^ – FCS playoff participant; Rankings from The Sports Network poll

The 2006 Coastal Carolina Chanticleers football team represented Coastal Carolina University as a member of the Big South Conference during the 2006 NCAA Division I FCS football season. Led by fourth-year head coach David Bennett, the Chanticleers compiled an overall record of 9–3 with a mark of 4–0 in conference play, winning the Big South title. Coastal Carolina earned the program's first berth to the NCAA Division I Football Championship playoffs, where the Chanticleers lost in the first round to the eventual national champion, Appalachian State. Coastal Carolina played home games at Brooks Stadium in Conway, South Carolina.

== Schedule ==
Date	Time	Opponent	Rank	Site	TV	Result	Attendance	Source
September 2	7:00 p.m.	Elon*	No. 25	Brooks Stadium; Conway, SC		L 20–23	8,169	
September 9	7:00 p.m.	at Wofford*		Gibbs Stadium; Spartanburg, SC		W 41–38	6,493	
September 16	7:00 p.m.	at No. 24 Georgia Southern*		Paulson Stadium; Statesboro, GA		L 21–38	17,303	
September 23	12:30 p.m.	South Carolina State*		Brooks Stadium; Conway, SC		W 33–14	9,287	
September 30	6:00 p.m.	at Winston-Salem State*		Bowman Gray Stadium; Winston-Salem, NC		W 31–12	4,701	
October 7	7:00 p.m.	No. 3 Furman*		Brooks Stadium; Conway, SC	CSS	W 29–27	10,013	
October 14	1:00 p.m.	at VMI		Alumni Memorial Field; Lexington, VA		W 31–27	7,810	
October 28	12:30 p.m.	Liberty	No. 22	Brooks Stadium; Conway, SC (rivalry)		W 28–26	6,964	
November 4	12:30 p.m.	Savannah State*	No. 17	Brooks Stadium; Conway, SC		W 66–6	6,703	
November 11	1:30 p.m.	at Gardner–Webb	No. 16	Ernest W. Spangler Stadium; Boiling Springs, NC		W 52–24	3,250	
November 18	1:30 p.m.	Charleston Southern	No. 13	Brooks Stadium; Conway, SC		W 31–17	7,669	
November 25	3:30 p.m.	at No. 1 Appalachian State*	No. 13	Kidd Brewer Stadium; Boone, NC (NCAA Division I First Round)	ESPNU	L 28–45	16,223	
*Non-conference game; Rankings from The Sports Network Poll released prior to the game; All times are in Eastern time
