= 2006 Savannah State Tigers football team =

American college football season

2006 Savannah State Tigers football
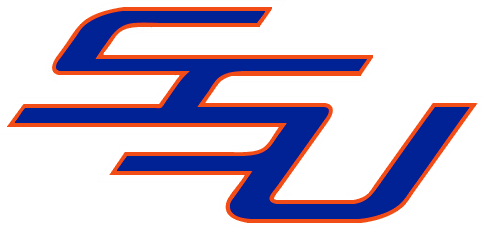
- Conference: Independent
- Record: 2–9
- Head coach: Theo Lemon (1st season)
- Offensive coordinator: Booker Collins (4th season)
- Offensive scheme: Multiple
- Defensive coordinator: Deon Tilburg (2nd season)
- Base defense: 4–3
- Home stadium: Ted Wright Stadium

2006 NCAA Division I FCS independents football standings
	Conf.			Overall
Team	W		L	W		L
No. 24 Central Arkansas*		–		8	–	3
Winston-Salem State		–		4	–	7
Austin Peay		–		3	–	8
Savannah State		–		2	–	9
* – Ineligible for postseason play due to transition from NCAA Division II; Rankings from The Sports Network poll

The 2006 Savannah State Tigers football team represented Savannah State University in American football. The Tigers were members of the NCAA Division I Football Championship Subdivision

== Schedule ==
Date	Time	Opponent	Site	Result	Attendance
September 2	6:00 p.m.	Benedict	Ted Wright Stadium; Savannah, GA	L 7–21	11,372
September 9	4:00 p.m.	at Bethune–Cookman	Municipal Stadium; Daytona Beach, FL	L 6–55	14,601
September 23	4:00 p.m.	Liberty	Ted Wright Stadium; Savannah, GA	L 0–28	12,708
September 30	2:00 p.m.	Miles	Ted Wright Stadium; Savannah, GA	L 12–24	12,916
October 7	7:00 p.m.	Charleston Southern	Ted Wright Stadium; Savannah, GA	L 13–38	11,651
October 14	1:00 p.m.	at Morehouse	B.T. Harvey Stadium; Atlanta, GA (Black Football Classic)	W 24–20	10,000
October 21	3:00 p.m.	Winston-Salem	Ted Wright Stadium; Savannah, GA	L 6–38	12,002
October 28	1:00 p.m.	at Johnson C. Smith	Irwin Belk Complex; Charlotte, NC	L 6–27	9,004
November 4	2:00 p.m.	at No. 17 Coastal Carolina	Brooks Stadium; Conway, SC	L 6–66	12,214
November 11	6:00 p.m.	Edward Waters^{†}	Memorial Stadium; Savannah, GA	W 28–7	15,111
November 18	1:00 p.m.	at No. 16 Cal Poly	Alex G. Spanos Stadium; San Luis Obispo, CA	L 0–55	11,075
^{†}Homecoming; Rankings from The Sports Network Poll released prior to the game; All times are in Eastern time

== Preseason ==
- Athletic director Sterling Steward Jr. announced the hiring of new head coach Theo Lemon
- 15 players signed letters of intent to attend Savannah State University on February 3, 2006.

Name	Position	School	City, State
Jacorey Kilcrease	Quarterback	Bayside High School	Clearwater, Florida
Antwon Edwards	Running back	Groves High School	Garden City, Georgia
Stephen Williams	Running back	Martin Luther King Jr High School	Lithonia, Georgia
Del Ben	Wide receiver	Sol C. Johnson High School	Savannah, Georgia
Isaiah Cruz	Wide receiver/Quarterback	Cross Keys High School	Augusta, Georgia
Amondo Harris	Wide receiver	Southwest High School	Macon, Georgia
Joshua Marshall	Tight end	Metter High School	Metter, Georgia
Derrick Dorsey	Offensive lineman	Alfred Ely Beach High School	Savannah, Georgia
Louis Hall	Offensive Line	Richmond Hill High School	Richmond Hill, Georgia
Horton Louima	Defensive Line	North Miami Beach Sr High	Miami, Florida
Chris Reed	Defensive lineman	Vidalia High School	Vidalia, Georgia
Luis Justiniano	Kicker	Jenkins County High School	Millen, Georgia
Brandon Luster	Linebacker	Jasper County High School	Monticello, Georgia
Steven Drinks	Defensive back	Wade Hampton High School	Varnville, South Carolina
Jonathan Johnson	Defensive back/Wide receiver	Jackson High School	Jackson, Georgia

== Coaches and support staff ==
Name	Type	College	Graduating year
Theo Lemon	Head coach	Ohio	1978
Booker Collins	Offensive coordinator	Oklahoma	1992
Deon Tilburg	Defensive coordinator	Butler	1993
Bobby Hull	Quarterbacks coach	Syracuse	1981
Lance Williams	Running backs coach	Tennessee State	2001
Steven Youngblood	wide receivers coach	Fort Valley state	1995
Cassius Brown	Tight Ends coach	Troy	1988
Mont'e Gordon	Offensive line coach	Bryant	1997
Juan Sanchez	assistant offensive line coach	San Jose State	1990
Xzavier Bryant	Defensive line coach	Point	1999
Dwayne Jones	Assistant defensive line coach	Lander	1997
Anthony Carter	linebackers coach	Florida State	1994
Wesley Gore	secondary coach	Clayton State	2000
Ricky Baxley	special teams	South Carolina State	1992
Mike Summer	Athletic Trainer	UNC-Pembroke	1985

== Roster ==
Quarterbacks

- 3 Jacorey Kilcrease – freshman
- 14 Brandon Dozier – Junior
- 6 Garrett Williams – sophomore
- 18 Daniel White – Freshman

Running backs

- 1 Quinton Beasley – Senior
- 32 Louis Bacon – Sophomore
- 22 Antwon Edwards – Freshman
- 31 Charles Howard – Junior
- 44 Craig Chambers – Sophomore
- 28 Reginald May – sophomore
- 48 Jerry Stinson – Sophomore
- 21 Stephen Williams – Freshman

Wide receivers

- 3 Solomon Agyei – Junior
- 7 Bernard Coleman – sophomore
- 17 Tyson Kirkland – sophomore
- 15 Isaiah Cruz – Freshman
- 5 Del Ben – Freshman
- 89 Anthony Bowden senior
- 86 David Roberson "Junior"
- 80 Derek Harkness– Junior
- 9 Deleon Hollinger – Senior
- 29 Amondo Harris – freshman
- 20 Llich Solano – sophomore

Tight ends

- 88 Joshua Marshall – Freshman
- 85 Terrence Kirkland – Junior
- 84 Marcus Harris – senior

Kickers / Punters

- 14 Luis Justiniano – freshman (K)
- 49 Jeremy Johnson – Junior (P)

Offensive line

- 73 Byron Allen – senior
- 75 James Arowoselu– Senior
- 59 Derrick Dorsey – freshman
- 66 Rashad Jackson – Junior
- 71 Kereem Riley – sophomore
- 70 Peter Booker – Sophomore
- 64 Justin Norton – sophomore
- 73 Tim Moss – Freshman
- 79 Louis Hall – freshman
- 67 Austin Davis – sophomore
- 65 Warren Washington – sophomore
- 66 Algernon Wright – freshman

Defensive line

- 55 Dominque Clark – Junior
- 93 Brandon Miller – freshman
- 90 Mike slaughter – Sophomore
- 99 Lee Riley – senior
- 48 Chris Browlson – Sophomore
- 57 Horton Louima– freshman
- 92 Randy Harling – Junior
- 91 Chris Reed– freshman
- 94 Chris Osborne – Junior
- 95 Tony Newman – sophomore
- 69 Randy Williams – Junior
- 87 Fred Wright – freshman

Linebackers

- 56 Jonathan Stewart – Junior
- 13 Brandon Luster – freshman
- 40 Dominque Wells – sophomore
- 41 Timothy Gregory – senior
- 93 Jalvin Lovett – Junior
- 44 Trent Newman – senior
- 16 Brandon Parker– sophomore
- 10 Josh Mitchell – sophomore
- 51 Calvin Leonard – Sophomore
- 45 DeAngelo Jenkins – freshman

Defensive backs

- 11 Larrione Carlyle – senior
- 26 Antwan Allen – freshman
- 19 Jeremy Boston – sophomore
- 13 Jonathan Johnson – freshman
- 15 Chris Herans – sophomore
- 49 Ryan Carmichael – sophomore
- 37 Nate Carr– Junior
- 29 Brandon Howard– sophomore
- 8 Steven Drinks – Freshman
- 43 Chester McBride – Junior
- 12 Frank Usher – sophomore

== Media ==
- Radio flagship: WHCJ
- Broadcasters: Steve Richards (play-by-play), Curtis Foster (analyst)

== Statistics ==
Current as of November 27, 2006 – All Games

=== Team ===
	Team	Opp
Scoring	235	480
Points per game	21.3	43.6
First downs	201	300
Rushing	1,629	2,178
Passing	1,793	2,898
Penalty	74	107
Total offense	3,422	5,076
Avg per play	4.4	6.8
Avg per game	311.0	461.4
Fumbles-Lost	21–14	17–10
Penalties-Yards	74–563	107.908
Avg per game	51.2	82.5

	Team	Opp
Punts-Yards	78–3,557	44–2,094
Avg per punt	45.6	47.6
Time of possession/Game	29.24	30:36
3rd down conversions	56 of 158 (35%)	68 of 129 (53%)
4th down conversions	4 of 13 (31%)	11 of 18 (61%)
Touchdowns scored	28	66
Field goals-Attempts	13–18	6-6
PAT-Attempts	28–28 (100%)	66–66 (100%)
Attendance	28,485	158,233
Games / Avg per Game	2 / 14,242	9 / 17,581

==== Scores by quarter ====
	1	2	3	4	Total
Savannah State	31	37	27	17	112
Opponents	101	152	87	101	441

=== Individual offense ===
==== Rushing ====
Name	GP	Att	Gain	Loss	Net	Avg	TD	Long	Avg/G
Beasley, Quinton	11	143	779	35	744	5.2	8	86	67.6
Bacon, Louis	11	93	619	15	604	6.5	5	69	54.9
Kilcrease, Jacorey	11	113	550	31	519	4.6	6	47	47.1
Edwards Antwon	11	49	233	23	210	4.3	4	38	19.1
Howard, Charles	11	22	113	9	104	4.7	2	31	9.4
Chambers, Craig	10	20	107	6	101	5.0	1	42	10.1
May, Reginald	10	12	66	0	66	5.5	2	29	6
Williams, Steven	11	12	49	3	46	3.8	1	24	4.1
Stinson, Jerry	6	10	33	0	33	3.3	0	9	5.5
Dozier, Brandon	7	5	22	7	15	2.7	0	6	2.1
Total	11	479	2,571	129	2,442	5.0	29	86	222.0
Opponents	11	366	2,028	125	1,903	5.2	20	90	173.0

==== Passing ====
Name	GP	Effic	Att-Cmp-Int	Pct	Yds	TD	Lng	Avg/G
Kilcrease Jacorey	11	97.4	128–66–3	51.5	804	4	62	73.0
Dozier, Brandon	7	89.5	41–21–1	51.2	247	1	42	35.2
Williams, Garrett	3	90.3	2–3–0	66.6	27	0	17	9
Total	11	93.4	89–172–4	51.7	1,078	5	62	98.0
Opponents	11	160.6	179–281–8	63.7	2,411	30	88	219.1

==== Receiving ====
Name	GP	No.	Yds	Avg	TD	Long	Avg/G
Babb, Justin	10	24	231	9.6	3	52	23.1
Heslop, Daniel	9	3	27	9.0	1	13	3.0
Hollinger, Deleon	10	51	509	10.0	4	40	50.9
Holmes, D.	1	1	5	5.0	0	5	5
McMullen, Chris	1	1	5	5.0	0	5	5.0
Taylor, Javares	9	27	214	7.9	0	26	23.8
Leggett, Byron	9	20	350	17.5	1	32	38.9
Talley, Deron	8	18	256	14.2	2	47	32.0
Taylor, Stefon	5	6	46	7.7	1	21	9.2
Rivera, Ricky	4	5	66	13.2	0	26	16.5
Total	10	156	1,703	10.9	12	52	170.3
Opponents	10	176	2,311	13.1	27	69	231.1

=== Defense ===
Name	GP	Tackles				Sacks	Pass defense			Fumbles		Blkd Kick	Saf
Name	GP	Solo	Ast	Total	TFL-Yds	No-Yds	INT-Yds	BrUp	QBH	Rcv-Yds	FF	Blkd Kick	Saf
Stewart, Jonathan	11	56	31	87	7–14	3-18	2–28	6	1	-	1	-	-
Allen, Coy	4	4	1	5	-	-	-	-	-	-	-	-	-
Alston, Travis	7	7	7	14	3.0–6	0.5–3	-	-	-	-	3	-	-
Asbury, Chris	10	32	22	54	1.5–8	-	-	-	-	-	-	-	-
Babb, Justin	10	-	1	1	-	-	-	-	-	-	-	-	-
Briscoe, James	6	3	4	7	0.5–2	-	-	-	-	-	-	-	-
Chambers, Cedric	3	1	2	3	-	-	-	-	-	-	-	-	-
Clay, Nate	1	1	-	1	-	-	-	-	-	-	-	-	-
Cochran, Vince	9	28	23	51	7.5–23	-	-	1	-	1–0	-	-	-
Cooper, Justin	8	14	10	24	-	-	1–19	5	-	-	-	-	-
Curry, Kurvin	10	1	-	1	-	-	-	-	-	-	-	-	-
Edwards, D.	5	1	-	1	-	-	-	-	-	-	-	-	-
Gaines, Phillip	4	2	4	6	0.5–0	-	-	-	-	-	-	-	-
Goodman, Juvaro	8	7	3	10	1.0–2	-	-	-	-	-	-	1	-
Hollinger, D.	10	1	-	1	-	-	-	-	-	-	-	-	-
Holt, Toriano	1	-	1	1	-	-	-	-	-	-	-	-	-
Howard, Johnny	8	7	13	20	3.0–8	0.5–3	-	-	-	1–0	-	-	-
Hunt, Tametric	10	8	11	19	4.0–11	1.5–2	-	1	-	-	-	-	-
Hunter, Darren	7	15	4	19	-	-	1–3	3	-	-	-	-	-
JeanBaptiste, S	10	27	23	50	7.0–25	2.5–11	-	-	-	-	-	1	1
Jefferson, J.	8	18	15	33	-	-	-	4	-	-	1	-	-
Kuku, Michaek	8	13	15	28	3.5–9	-	-	1	-	1–0	1	-	-
Leggett, Byron	9	1	-	1	-	-	-	-	-	-	-	-	-
McCall, Brent	4	2	2	4	-	-	-	-	-	-	-	-	-
Miller, Brandon	2	2	-	2	1.0–3	-	-	-	-	-	-	-	-
Myers, Stephan	2	1	2	3	1.0–1	-	-	-	-	-	-	-	-
Ndem, Edward	9	32	24	56	1.5–4	-	1–19	6	7	-	1	1	-
Printup, Deshawn	1	-	1	1	-	-	-	-	-	-	-	-	-
Redfield, L.	10	27	23	50	7.0–25	2.5–11	-	-	-	-	-	1	-
Reed, Chris	10	25	25	50	11.5–62	6.5–43	-	2	2	2–0	2	2	-
Robertson, J.	9	10	14	24	2.0–13	-	-	-	-	2–0	-	-	-
Rucker, Richie	7	9	4	13	-	-	-	1	-	1–0	-	-	-
Russell, Rashard	5	-	-	-	-	-	-	-	-	-	-	1	-
Smith, Matthew	5	7	5	12	-	-	-	2	-	-	-	-	-
Talley, Deron	8	1	-	1	-	-	-	-	-	-	-	-	-
TEAM	3	-	-	-	-	-	-	-	-	1–0	-	-	1
Thomas, Anthony	10	10	17	27	1.0–3	-	-	1	-	1–0	-	-	-
Thomas, Patrick	3	2	2	4	-	-	-	2	-	-	-	-	-
Welch, Channing	8	14	13	27	9.0–40	2.5–13	-	1	-	-	-	-	-
Williams, Derek	10	3	1	4	-	-	-	-	-	-	-	-	-
Williams, Emery	1	1	-	1	-	-	-	-	-	-	-	-	-
Total	10	365	334	699	71–268	18–85	4–62	36	6	13–0	12	6	1
Opponents	10	361	326	687	65–291	25–181	12–331	26	38	3–0	2	1	-

=== Special teams ===
Name	Punting								Kickoffs				
Name	No.	Yds	Avg	Long	TB	FC	I20	Blkd	No.	Yds	Avg	TB	OB
Defilippis, A.J.	1	48	48.0	48	1	0	0	0	3	152	50.7	0	0
Tarver, Vance	2	68	34.0	38	0	0	0	0	3	172	57.3	0	0
TEAM	1	0	0.0	0	0	0	0	0	0	0	0	0	0
Williams, Derek	54	2,040	37.8	58	5	5	12	1	40	2,170	54.2	0	0
Total	58	2,156	37.2	58	6	5	12	1	43	2,342	54.5	0	0
Opponents	43	1,617	37.6	64	2	0	7	2	62	3,647	58.8	7	3

Name	Punt returns					Kick returns				
Name	No.	Yds	Avg	TD	Long	No.	Yds	Avg	TD	Long
Allen, Antwan	0	0	0.0	0	0	1	26	26.0	0	26
Beaurem, Thomas	0	0	0.0	0	0	19	332	17.5	0	38
Campbell, C.	0	0	0.0	0	0	2	71	35.5	0	43
Heslop, Daniel	0	0	0.0	0	0	1	9	9.0	0	9
Hollinger, D.	12	191	15.9	0	38					
Hunter, Darren	1	0	0.0	0	0	0	0	0	0	0
JeanBaptiste, S.	1	6	6.0	0	0	0	0	0.0	0	0
Jefferson, J.	0	0	0.0	0	0	11	254	23.1	0	48
Proctor, Antonio	0	0	0.0	0	0	11	196	17.8	0	23
Rivera, Ricky	2	39	19.5	0	21	0	0	0	0	0
Russell, Rashard	1	18	18.0	0	0	6	130	21.7	0	36
Veasy, Steven	0	0	0.0	0	0	1	0	0.0	0	0
Total	17	254	14.9	0	38	52	1,018	19.6	0	48
Opponents	26	159	6.1	0	39	40	884	22.1	0	56
