= 2006 Liberty Flames football team =

American college football season

2006 Liberty Flames football
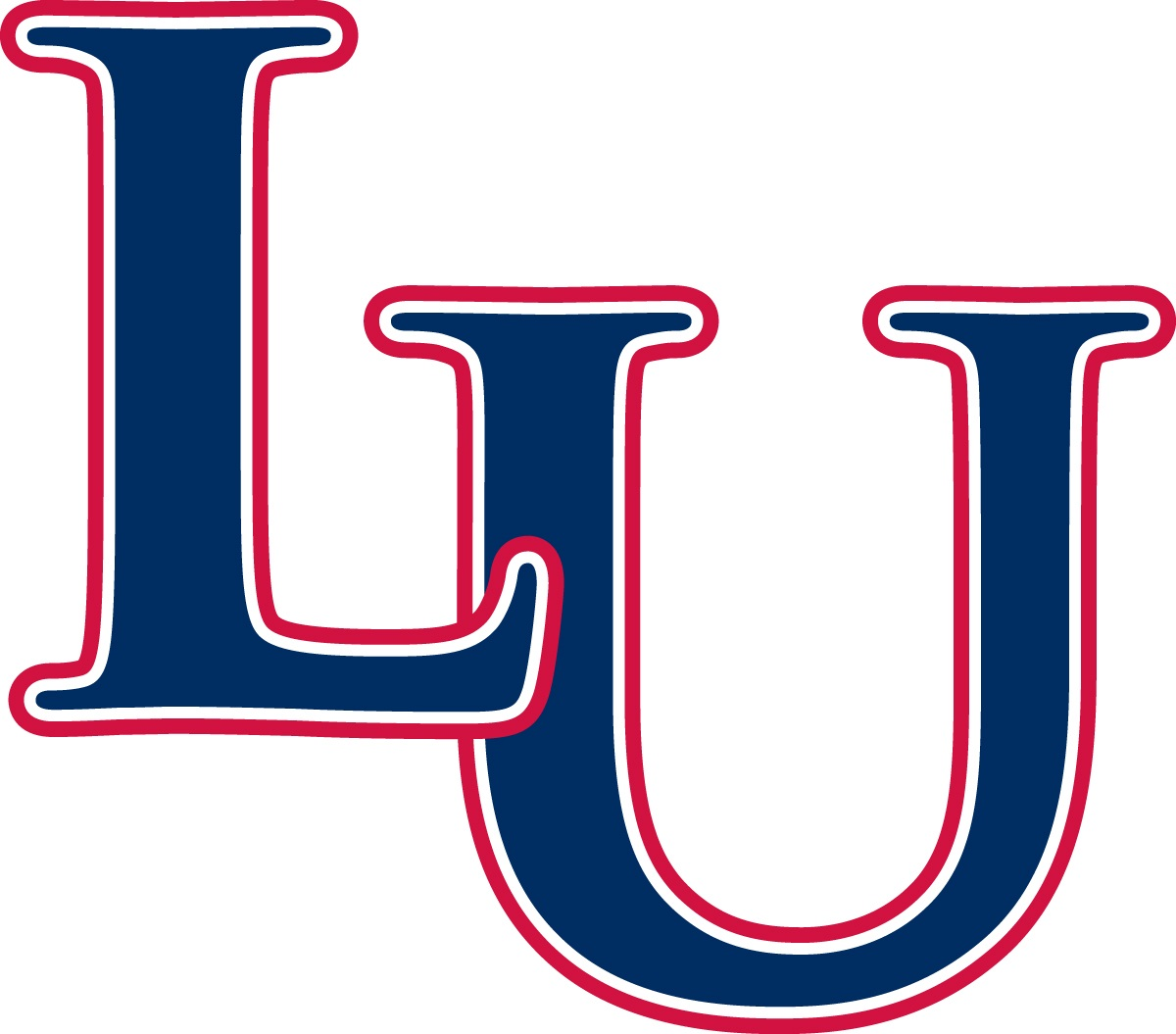
- Conference: Big South Conference
- Record: 6–5 (2–2 Big South)
- Head coach: Danny Rocco (1st season)
- Offensive coordinator: Scott Wachenheim (1st season)
- Defensive coordinator: Tom Clark (1st season)
- Base defense: 3–4
- Home stadium: Williams Stadium

2006 Big South Conference football standings
	Conf.			Overall
Team	W		L	W		L
No. 14 Coastal Carolina $^	4	–	0	9	–	3
Charleston Southern	2	–	2	9	–	2
Gardner–Webb	2	–	2	6	–	5
Liberty	2	–	2	6	–	5
VMI	0	–	4	1	–	10
$ – Conference champion; ^ – FCS playoff participant; Rankings from The Sports Network poll

The 2006 Liberty Flames football team represented Liberty University a member of the Big South Conference during the 2006 NCAA Division I FCS football season. Led by first-year head coach Danny Rocco, the Flames compiled an overall record of 6–5 with a mark of 2–2 in conference play, placing in a three-way tie for second in the Big South. Liberty played home games at Williams Stadium in Lynchburg, Virginia.

Following the firing of former coach Ken Karcher, who headed the Liberty football team from 2000 to 2005, the Flames announced Rocco as their new head coach on December 2, 2005.

== Schedule ==
Date	Time	Opponent	Site	TV	Result	Attendance
August 31	7:00 pm	Saint Paul's (VA)*	Williams Stadium; Lynchburg, VA		W 27–0	8,546
September 9	7:00 pm	Glenville State*	Williams Stadium; Lynchburg, VA		W 31–7	11,423
September 16	6:00 pm	at Towson*	Johnny Unitas Stadium; Towson, MD		L 3–10	4,665
September 23	6:00 pm	at Savannah State*	Ted Wright Stadium; Savannah, GA		W 28–0	12,708
September 30	3:30 pm	at Wake Forest*	Groves Stadium; Winston-Salem, NC	ESPN360	L 14–34	29,623
October 14	1:00 pm	William & Mary*^{†}	Williams Stadium; Lynchburg, VA		L 13–14	15,631
October 21	1:00 pm	Gardner–Webb	Williams Stadium; Lynchburg, VA		L 24–27	12,056
October 28	12:30 pm	at No. 22 Coastal Carolina	Brooks Stadium; Conway, SC (rivalry)		L 26–28	6,964
November 4	1:00 pm	Western Carolina*	Williams Stadium; Lynchburg, VA		W 21–0	8,286
November 11	1:00 pm	No. 24 Charleston Southern	Williams Stadium; Lynchburg, VA		W 34–20	10,823
November 18	1:00 pm	at VMI	Alumni Memorial Field; Lexington, VA		W 38–32	6,177
*Non-conference game; ^{†}Homecoming; Rankings from The Sports Network Poll released prior to the game; All times are in Eastern time
