= 2006 Furman Paladins football team =

American college football season

2006 Furman Paladins football

NCAA Division I First Round, L 13–31 vs. Montana State
- Conference: Southern Conference
- Record: 8–4 (6–1 SoCon)
- Head coach: Bobby Lamb (5th season)
- Captains: John Kivett; Josh Stepp; Brad Bell; Wesley Bray; Roy Ravenell; Jeremy Blocker
- Home stadium: Paladin Stadium

2006 Southern Conference football standings
	Conf.			Overall
Team	W		L	W		L
No. 1 Appalachian State $^	7	–	0	14	–	1
No. 12 Furman ^	6	–	1	8	–	4
No. 23 Wofford	5	–	2	7	–	4
The Citadel	4	–	3	5	–	6
Elon	2	–	5	5	–	6
Chattanooga	2	–	5	3	–	8
Georgia Southern	2	–	5	3	–	8
Western Carolina	0	–	7	2	–	9
$ – Conference champion; ^ – FCS playoff participant; Rankings from The Sports Network poll

The 2006 Furman Paladins football team was an American football team that represented Furman University as a member of the Southern Conference (SoCon) during the 2006 NCAA Division I FCS football season. In their fifth year under head coach Bobby Lamb, the Paladins compiled an overall record of 8–4 with a conference mark of 6–1, finishing second in the SoCon. Furman advanced to the playoffs, where they were defeated by Montana State in the first round.

== Schedule ==
Date	Time	Opponent	Rank	Site	TV	Result	Attendance	Source
September 2	1:30 p.m.	Jacksonville State*	No. 4	Paladin Stadium; Greenville, SC	CSTV	W 17–13	10,911	
September 9	6:00 p.m.	West Georgia*	No. 4	Paladin Stadium; Greenville, SC		W 24–7	10,052	
September 16	7:00 p.m.	at North Carolina*	No. 4	Kenan Memorial Stadium; Chapel Hill, NC	ESPNU	L 42–45	47,000	
September 23	7:00 p.m.	No. 22 Western Carolina	No. 3	Paladin Stadium; Greenville, SC	CSS	W 42–7	14,232	
September 30	3:30 p.m.	at Wofford	No. 3	Gibbs Stadium; Spartanburg, SC (rivalry)	CSS	W 35–21	9,107	
October 7	7:00 p.m.	at Coastal Carolina*	No. 3	Brooks Stadium; Conway, SC	CSS	L 27–29	10,013	
October 14	2:00 p.m.	The Citadel	No. 12	Paladin Stadium; Greenville, SC (rivalry)		W 23–17	13,427	
October 21	2:00 p.m.	Chattanooga^{†}	No. 8	Paladin Stadium; Greenville, SC		W 28–22 ^{OT}	12,740	
October 28	3:30 p.m.	at No. 1 Appalachian State	No. 8	Kidd Brewer Stadium; Boone, NC	SportSouth	L 7–40	24,447	
November 4	2:00 p.m.	at Elon	No. 10	Rhodes Stadium; Elon, NC		W 24–13	9,226	
November 11	3:30 p.m.	Georgia Southern	No. 8	Paladin Stadium; Greenville, SC	CSS	W 13–10	13,287	
November 25	1:30 p.m.	at No. 7 Montana State*	No. 18	Bobcat Stadium; Bozeman, MT		L 13–31	9,427	
*Non-conference game; ^{†}Homecoming; Rankings from The Sports Network Poll released prior to the game; All times are in Eastern time
