= List of college football venues with non-traditional field colors =

This is a list of college football venues with non-traditional field colors. Traditionally, college football is played on grass fields. As technology advanced, the use of various kinds of artificial turf as a playing surface became more and more popular. With the artificial turf came the ability to have field colors other than green. Although many programs that choose an artificial surface for games do keep a green surface, a few have chosen other colors.

It is common for the end zones to be painted a different color, but as of the 2015 season only seven programs have their field color other than the traditional green. Six of the programs participate in the NCAA and one in the NAIA.

== Active venues ==
Conference affiliations are accurate as of the 2026 college football season.

Stadium	Team	Location	Division	Conference	Field color	Year installed	Capacity	Notes
Albertsons Stadium	Boise State Broncos	Boise, Idaho	NCAA Division I FBS	Pac-12 Conference	Blue	1986	36,387	Nicknamed "The Blue" and "Smurf Turf". The first college stadium field to be any color other than traditional green, as well as the only college to have a non-green field for 22 years (1986–2008). In 2011, the Mountain West Conference banned Boise from wearing their all-blue uniforms during home conference games, after complaints from other Mountain West coaches that it was an unfair advantage. The uniform restrictions were removed from 2013 forward as part of the deal that kept Boise State in that conference after it had initially planned to leave. Boise State holds a trademark on any non-green field, not just blue; the enforceability of such a vague trademark has been questioned. It has licensed the right to use blue fields to several high schools as well as the University of New Haven, and also issues free licenses to any school or team that uses a color other than blue or orange, Boise State's school colors.
Alumni Memorial Stadium	Livingstone Blue Bears	Salisbury, North Carolina	NCAA Division II	Central Intercollegiate Athletic Association	Light blue	2022	6,000	
Blue Storm Stadium	University of New England Nor'Easters	Biddeford, Maine	NCAA Division III	Conference of New England	Blue	2018	1,600	Location renovated from the Big Blue Turf, which opened in September 2010.
Brooks Stadium	Coastal Carolina Chanticleers	Conway, South Carolina	NCAA Division I FBS	Sun Belt Conference	Teal	2015	21,000	Nicknamed "The Surf Turf"
Carlson Stadium	Luther Norse	Decorah, Iowa	NCAA Division III	American Rivers Conference	Blue	2017	5,000	First non-green field in NCAA Division III
CAU Panther Stadium	Clark Atlanta Panthers	Atlanta, Georgia	NCAA Division II	Southern Intercollegiate Athletic Conference	Red	2024	5,000	
Don Drumm Stadium	Marietta Pioneers	Marietta, Ohio	NCAA Division III	Ohio Athletic Conference	Two shades of gray alternating every five yards	2018	5,000	
Drake Field	Morrisville Mustangs	Morrisville, New York	NCAA Division III	Empire 8	Black	2023	1,500	
Estes Stadium	Central Arkansas Bears	Conway, Arkansas	NCAA Division I FCS	United Athletic Conference	Purple and gray alternating every five yards	2011	10,000	Referred to as playing on “The Stripes”
Ralph F. DellaCamera Stadium	New Haven Chargers	West Haven, Connecticut	NCAA Division I FCS	Northeast Conference	Blue	2009	5,000	New Haven and Boise State reached an agreement in 2009 to license the use of Boise State's trademark blue field. New Haven calls their field a "blue and yellow" field as part of the agreement.
Roos Field	Eastern Washington Eagles	Cheney, Washington	NCAA Division I FCS	Big Sky Conference	Red	2010	8,700	Nicknamed "The Inferno".
Rynearson Stadium	Eastern Michigan Eagles	Ypsilanti, Michigan	NCAA Division I FBS	Mid-American Conference	Gray	2014	30,200	Nicknamed "The Factory" by head coach Chris Creighton in honor of the area's 100+ years of automotive history .
Tomahawks Field	Hosei Orange	Tokyo, Japan	Japan American Football Association	Kantoh Collegiate American Football Association	Blue	2012	0	Granted special permission and an international trademark from Boise State to use blue turf.
Walter M. Katz Field	Curry Colonels	Milton, Massachusetts	NCAA Division III	Conference of New England	Purple	2026	2,000	
Wilford Moore Stadium	McMurry War Hawks	Abilene, Texas	NCAA Division III	American Southwest Conference	Maroon and gray alternating every five yards	2025	3,550	

== Defunct venues ==
Stadium	Team	Location	Division	Conference	Field color	Year installed	Capacity	Notes
Lindenwood Stadium	Lindenwood Lynx	Belleville, Illinois	N/A (NAIA through 2019)	N/A (Mid-States Football Association through 2019)	Red and gray alternating every five yards	2012	Unknown	Has been called "the nation's most original (hideous) football field". Lindenwood University closed its Belleville campus in 2020 and later sold it to the city of Belleville. Southwestern Illinois College, which now manages the campus on the city's behalf, replaced Lindenwood's turf with a surface striped in two different shades of green in 2023.

== Other levels of play with non-traditional colors ==
Other programs outside of college football have non-traditional colors. Lincoln College Preparatory Academy in Kansas City, Missouri has blue turf with yellow sidelines surrounded by a red track. Barrow High School in Utqiagvik, Alaska (formerly named Barrow) also has a blue turf, as do high schools in Hidalgo, Texas; Santee, California; Lovington, New Mexico; Ravenna, Ohio; Colonia, New Jersey; Oxford, Michigan; and Spotsylvania, Virginia. West Salem High School in Salem, Oregon has a black field. St. Mary's Preparatory in Orchard Lake Village, Michigan has red turf, as do Edgewood High School in Ellettsville, Indiana and Ludlow High School in Ludlow, Kentucky. Trona High School in Trona, San Bernardino County, California has an all-dirt field, the only one in the United States outside of Alaska. Belle Vernon Area School District uses a gold turf with black accents. Tenino High School has a black turf football field. Moore Catholic High School in Staten Island, New York unveiled its red turf field in 2021. Also in Kentucky, Paris High School in the city of that name unveiled an orange field in 2024.

The Nebraska Danger of the Indoor Football League also play on a black field, while the Trenton Freedom of the Professional Indoor Football League began play in 2014 on a red field. From 2014 to 2016, the L.A. KISS of the Arena Football League played on a silver field. Two teams currently in the National Arena League use non-traditional field colors. The Lehigh Valley Steelhawks moved to Allentown, Pennsylvania in 2015, and began using a black field, while the Massachusetts Pirates began play in 2018 on a dark blue field. The Buffalo Lightning of American Indoor Football, for convenience purposes, used a plain Haudenosaunee-purple field with no field markings except for goal lines; the Lightning play their games on a hastily converted box lacrosse court.

The National Football League has prohibited the use of non-traditional field colors without league permission since 2011, and no team in the league has ever attempted doing so. The United Football League twice rejected playing on a nontraditionally colored field; it rejected Rynearson Stadium as a home for the Michigan Panthers specifically because of the gray turf (which, due to the lack of any other viable replacement, eventually led to the team being shuttered), and a plan to bring the UFL to Boise fell through with no agreement, with Albertsons Stadium's blue turf being one sticking point in the negotiations.

== Gallery ==
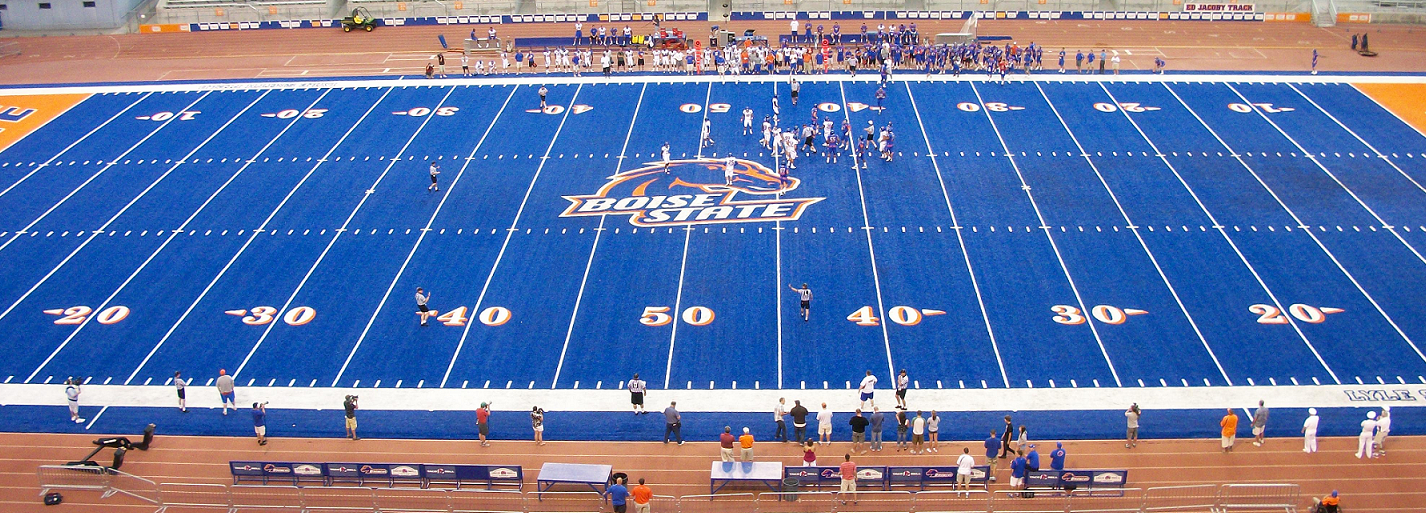
Boise State's Albertsons Stadium is known for its "smurf turf"

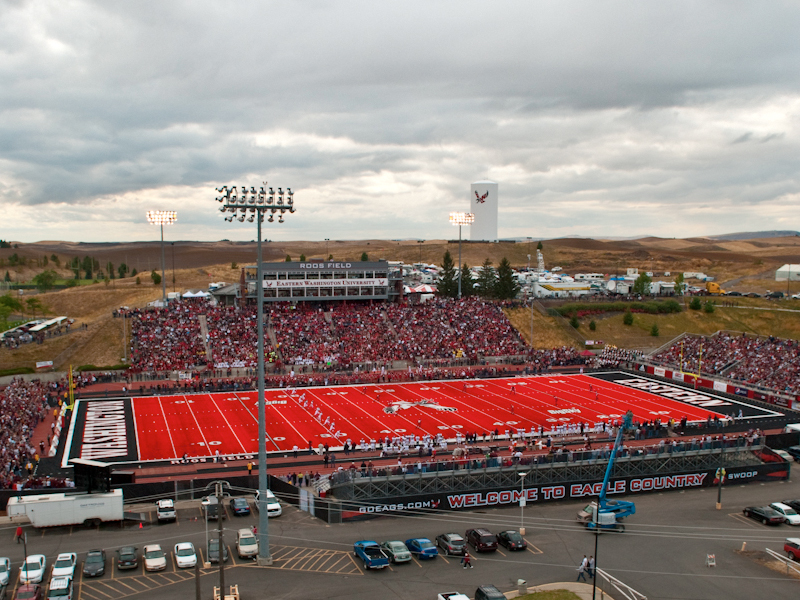
Eastern Washington's Roos Field has a distinctive bright red color.

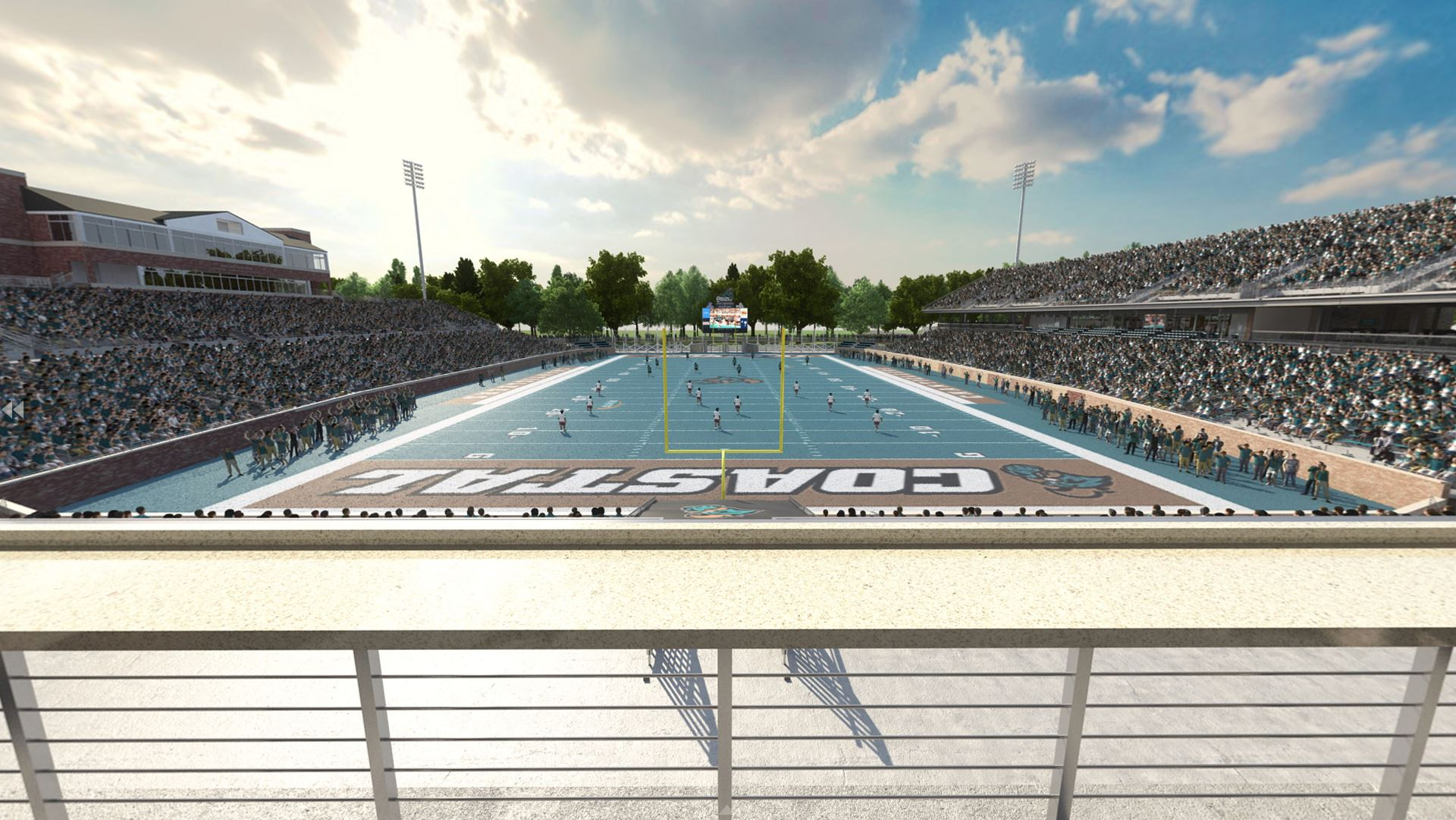
Coastal Carolina's Brooks Stadium uses a teal turf.

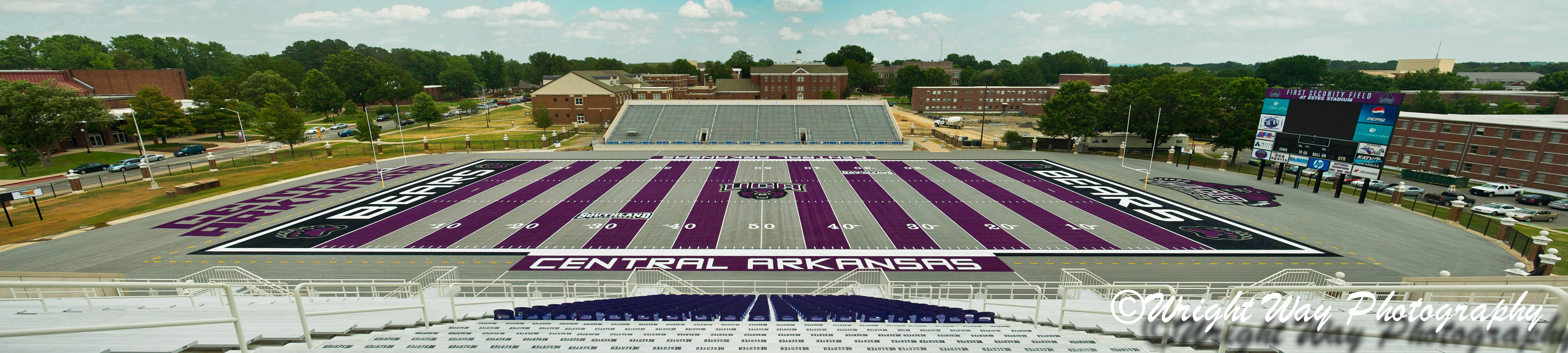
Estes Stadium alternates purple and gray.

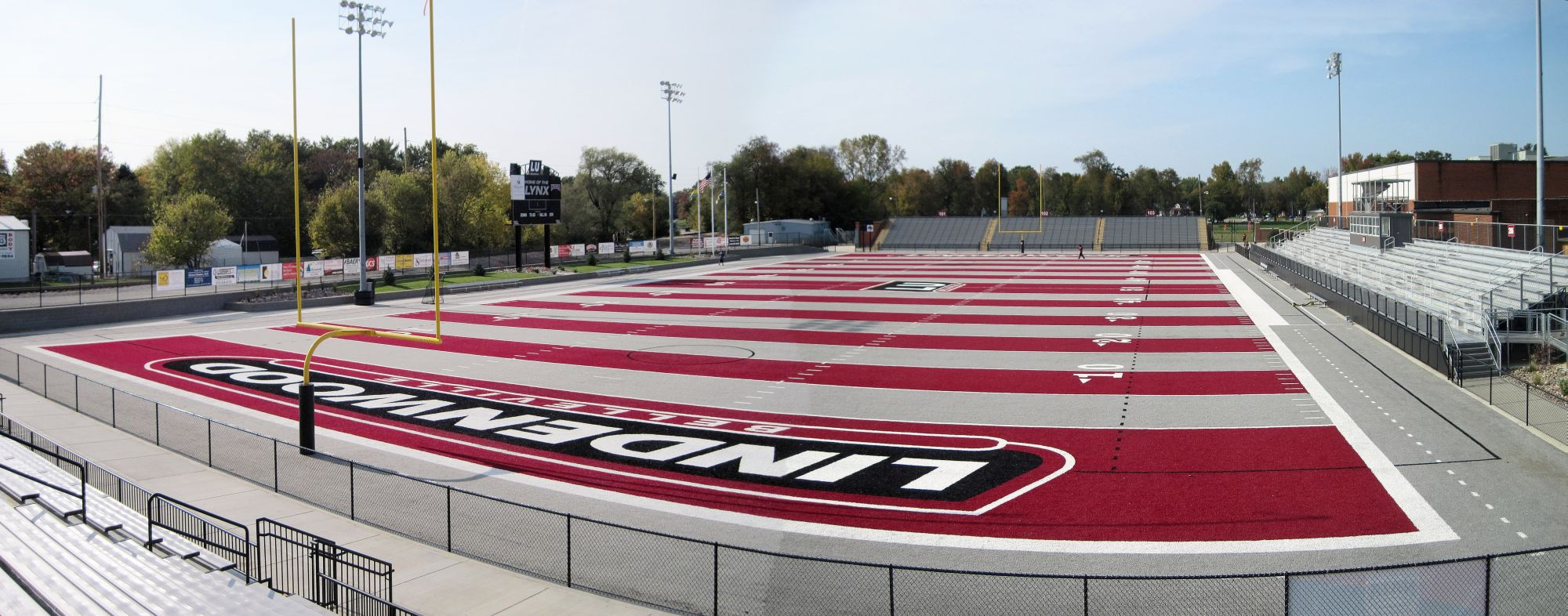
Lindenwood Stadium, called "The nation's most original football field"

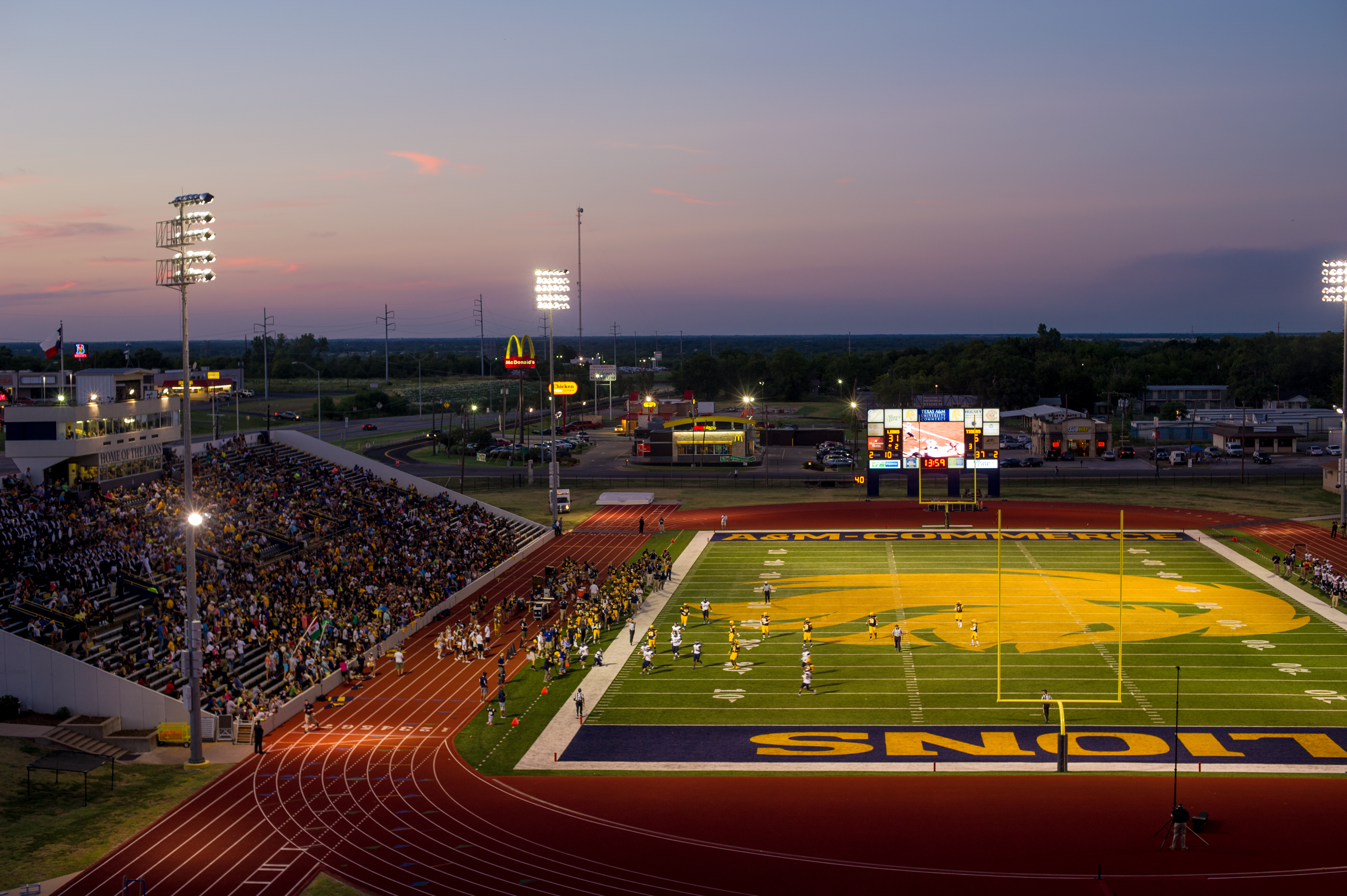
Commerce, Texas's Memorial Stadium, while using a green base, features a very large logo that colors much of the field gold.

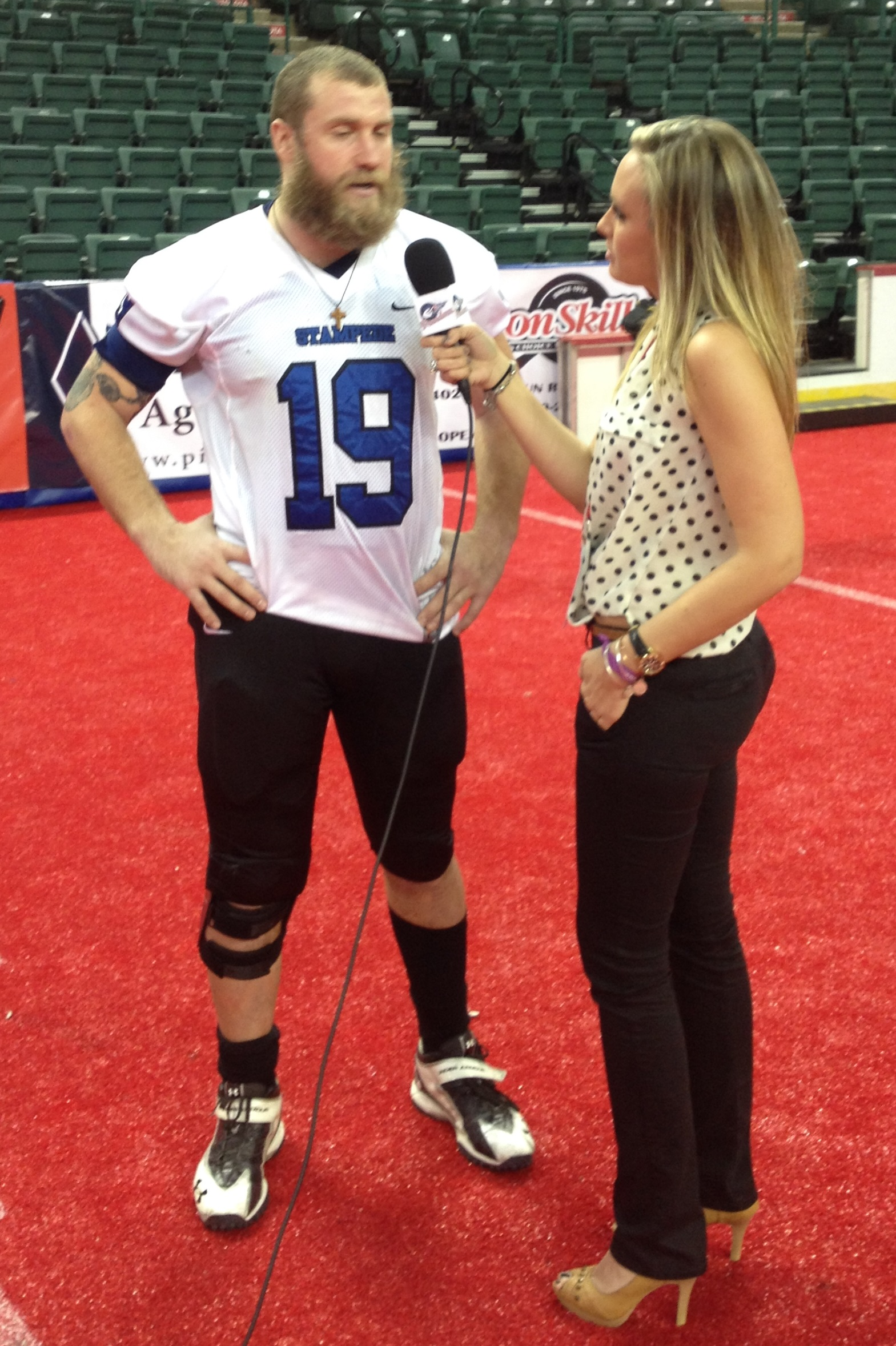
The red turf of the Trenton Freedom is seen (quarterback E. J. Nemeth in foreground)

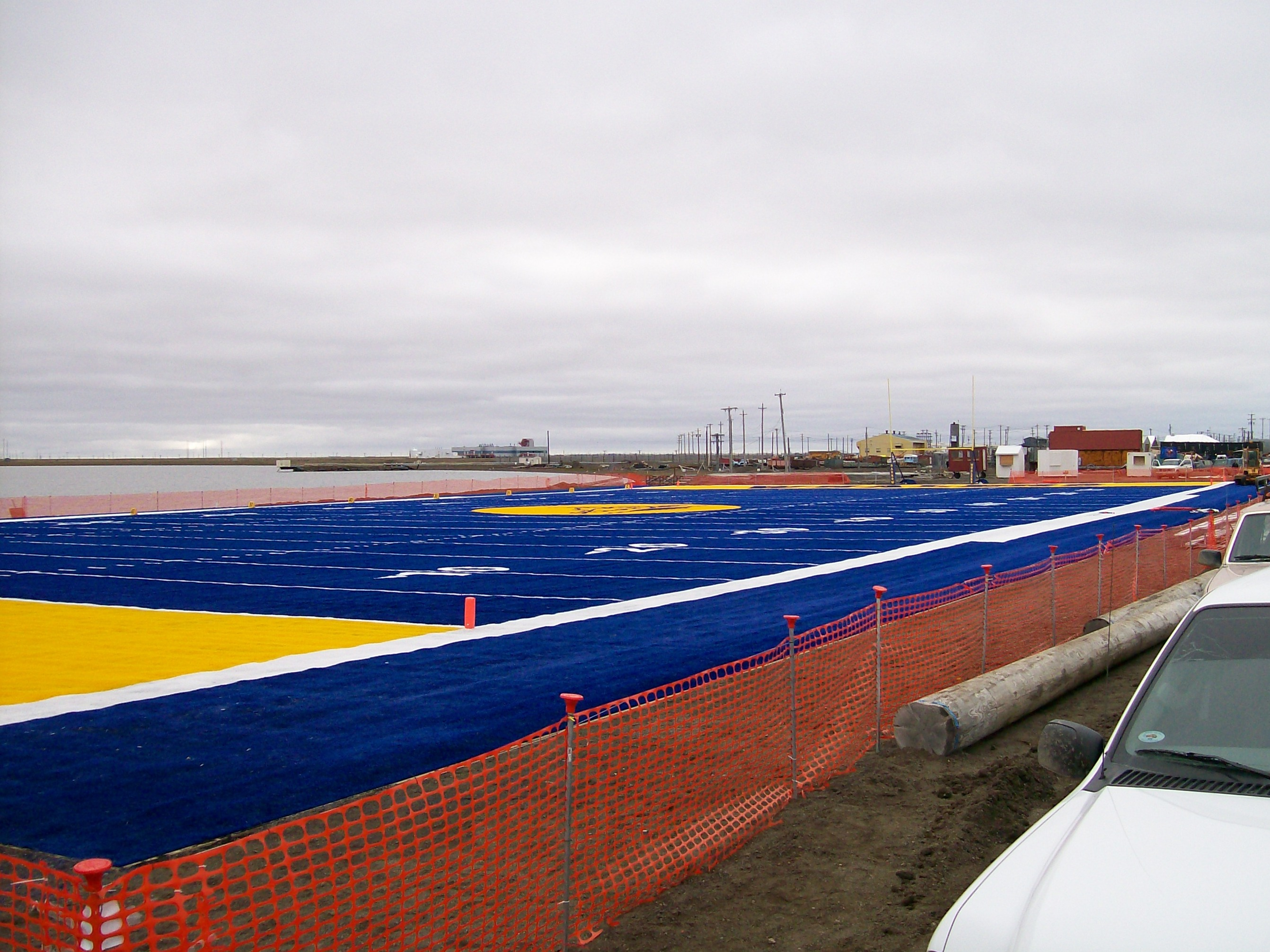
The blue and yellow field of northern Alaska's Barrow High School is also the northernmost American football field in the world.
