= 2006 Gardner–Webb Runnin' Bulldogs football team =

American college football season

2006 Gardner–Webb Runnin' Bulldogs football
- Conference: Big South Conference
- Record: 6–5 (2–2 Big South)
- Head coach: Steve Patton (10th season)
- Home stadium: Ernest W. Spangler Stadium

2006 Big South Conference football standings
	Conf.			Overall
Team	W		L	W		L
No. 14 Coastal Carolina $^	4	–	0	9	–	3
Charleston Southern	2	–	2	9	–	2
Gardner–Webb	2	–	2	6	–	5
Liberty	2	–	2	6	–	5
VMI	0	–	4	1	–	10
$ – Conference champion; ^ – FCS playoff participant; Rankings from The Sports Network poll

The 2006 Gardner–Webb Runnin' Bulldogs football team represented Gardner–Webb University as a member of the Big South Conference during the 2006 NCAA Division I FCS football season. Led by Steve Patton in his 10th-year as head coach, the Runnin' Bulldogs compiled an overall record of 6–5 with a mark of 2–2 in conference play, tying for second place in the Big South. Gardner–Webb played home games at Ernest W. Spangler Stadium in Boiling Springs, North Carolina.

== Schedule ==
Date	Time	Opponent	Site	TV	Result	Attendance	Source
September 2	12:30 pm	at Jacksonville*	D. B. Milne Field; Jacksonville, FL		W 49–14	2,365	
September 9	6:00 pm	Tennessee Tech*	Ernest W. Spangler Stadium; Boiling Springs, NC		W 30–26	3,400	
September 16	2:00 pm	at Tennessee–Martin*	Graham Stadium; Martin, TN		L 9–35	2,004	
September 23	6:00 pm	No. 2 Appalachian State*	Ernest W. Spangler Stadium; Boiling Springs, NC	ESPNU	L 6–41	8,490	
September 30	7:00 pm	at Southeastern Louisiana*	Strawberry Stadium; Hammond, LA		W 28–21	5,122	
October 14	6:00 pm	Glenville State*	Ernest W. Spangler Stadium; Boiling Springs, NC		W 31–23		
October 21	1:00 pm	at Liberty	Williams Stadium; Lynchburg, VA		W 27–24	12,056	
October 28	1:30 pm	VMI	Ernest W. Spangler Stadium; Boiling Springs, NC		W 35–31	3,810	
November 4	1:30 pm	at Charleston Southern	Buccaneer Field; Charleston, SC		L 14–28	3,783	
November 11	1:30 pm	No. 16 Coastal Carolina	Ernest W. Spangler Stadium; Boiling Springs, NC		L 24–52	3,250	
November 18	1:30 pm	Wofford*	Ernest W. Spangler Stadium; Boiling Springs, NC		L 17–34	3,112	
*Non-conference game; Rankings from The Sports Network Poll released prior to the game; All times are in Eastern time
