= 2006 Appalachian State Mountaineers football team =

American college football season

2006 Appalachian State Mountaineers football

NCAA Division I champion SoCon champion

NCAA Division I Championship, W 28–17 vs. UMass
- Conference: Southern Conference

Ranking
- Sports Network: No. 1
- Record: 14–1 (7–0 Southern)
- Head coach: Jerry Moore (18th season)
- Offensive coordinator: Collaborative
- Offensive scheme: Multiple Spread
- Defensive coordinator: John Wiley (16th season)
- Base defense: 4–3
- Home stadium: Kidd Brewer Stadium

2006 Southern Conference football standings
	Conf.			Overall
Team	W		L	W		L
No. 1 Appalachian State $^	7	–	0	14	–	1
No. 12 Furman ^	6	–	1	8	–	4
No. 23 Wofford	5	–	2	7	–	4
The Citadel	4	–	3	5	–	6
Elon	2	–	5	5	–	6
Chattanooga	2	–	5	3	–	8
Georgia Southern	2	–	5	3	–	8
Western Carolina	0	–	7	2	–	9
$ – Conference champion; ^ – FCS playoff participant; Rankings from The Sports Network poll

The 2006 Appalachian State Mountaineers football team represented Appalachian State University in the 2006 NCAA Division I FCS football season. The team was coached by Jerry Moore and played their home games at Kidd Brewer Stadium in Boone, North Carolina.

The football team competes in the Division I Football Championship Subdivision (FCS), formerly I-AA, as a member of the Southern Conference. Appalachian is the only university in North Carolina, public or private, to win a National Collegiate Athletic Association (NCAA) national championship in football. Appalachian won the 2005 Division I-AA Football Championship and repeated as FCS national champions in 2006.

== Schedule ==
Date	Time	Opponent	Rank	Site	TV	Result	Attendance	Source
September 2	6:00 p.m.	at NC State*	No. 1	Carter–Finley Stadium; Raleigh, NC		L 10–23	57,583	
September 9	3:30 p.m.	No. 12 James Madison*	No. 1	Kidd Brewer Stadium; Boone, NC		W 21–10	23,814	
September 16	3:30 p.m.	Mars Hill*	No. 2	Kidd Brewer Stadium; Boone, NC		W 41–0	24,346	
September 23	6:00 p.m.	at Gardner–Webb*	No. 2	Ernest W. Spangler Stadium; Boiling Springs, NC	ESPNU	W 41–6	8,490	
September 30	3:30 p.m.	Elon^{†}	No. 2	Kidd Brewer Stadium; Boone, NC		W 45–21	26,620	
October 7	6:00 p.m.	at Chattanooga	No. 2	Finley Stadium; Chattanooga, TN		W 56–21	8,887	
October 14	3:30 p.m.	Wofford	No. 2	Kidd Brewer Stadium; Boone, NC		W 14–7	18,758	
October 21	12:00 p.m.	at Georgia Southern	No. 1	Paulson Stadium; Statesboro, GA	SportSouth	W 27–20 ^{2OT}	19,438	
October 28	3:30 p.m.	No. 8 Furman	No. 1	Kidd Brewer Stadium; Boone, NC (Black Saturday)	SportSouth	W 40–7	24,447	
November 4	3:30 p.m.	The Citadel	No. 1	Kidd Brewer Stadium; Boone, NC		W 42–13	17,547	
November 11	4:00 p.m.	at Western Carolina	No. 1	E. J. Whitmire Stadium; Cullowhee, NC (Battle for the Old Mountain Jug)		W 31–9	13,742	
November 25	3:30 p.m.	No. 13 Coastal Carolina*	No. 1	Kidd Brewer Stadium; Boone, NC (NCAA Division I First Round)	ESPNU	W 45–28	16,223	
December 2	4:00 p.m.	No. 18 Montana State*	No. 1	Kidd Brewer Stadium; Boone, NC (NCAA Division I Quarterfinal)	ESPN2	W 38–17	15,116	
December 9	4:00 p.m.	No. 5 Youngstown State*	No. 1	Kidd Brewer Stadium; Boone, NC (NCAA Division I Semifinal)	ESPN	W 49–24	18,040	
December 15	8:00 p.m.	vs. No. 3 UMass*	No. 1	Finley Stadium; Chattanooga, TN (NCAA Division I Championship Game)	ESPN2	W 28–17	22,808	
*Non-conference game; ^{†}Homecoming; Rankings from The Sports Network Poll released prior to the game; All times are in Eastern time

== Game summaries ==
=== NC State ===
	1	2	3	4	Total
Appalachian State	7	0	3	0	10
NC State	9	7	7	0	23

=== James Madison ===
	1	2	3	4	Total
James Madison	3	0	7	0	10
Appalachian State	7	14	0	0	21

=== Mars Hill ===
	1	2	3	4	Total
Mars Hill	0	0	0	0	0
Appalachian State	13	14	7	7	41

=== Gardner–Webb ===
	1	2	3	4	Total
Appalachian State	6	7	21	7	41
Gardner–Webb	3	0	0	3	6

=== Elon ===
	1	2	3	4	Total
Elon	0	7	7	7	21
Appalachian State	10	21	14	0	45

=== Chattanooga ===
	1	2	3	4	Total
Appalachian State	14	21	14	7	56
Chattanooga	0	0	14	7	21

=== Wofford ===
	1	2	3	4	Total
Wofford	0	0	7	0	7
Appalachian State	14	0	0	0	14

=== Georgia Southern ===
	1	2	3	4	OT	2OT	Total
Appalachian State	0	3	7	7	3	7	27
Georgia Southern	0	7	3	7	3	0	20

=== Furman ===
	1	2	3	4	Total
Furman	7	0	0	0	7
Appalachian State	0	14	12	14	40

=== The Citadel ===
	1	2	3	4	Total
The Citadel	3	0	3	7	13
Appalachian State	7	14	14	7	42

=== Western Carolina ===
	1	2	3	4	Total
Appalachian State	3	14	7	7	31
Western Carolina	0	0	2	7	9

=== Coastal Carolina ===
	1	2	3	4	Total
Coastal Carolina	0	0	13	15	28
Appalachian State	17	14	7	7	45

=== Montana State ===
	1	2	3	4	Total
Montana State	0	10	7	0	17
Appalachian State	14	3	7	14	38

=== Youngstown State ===
	1	2	3	4	Total
Youngstown State	0	14	3	7	24
Appalachian State	7	21	7	14	49

=== Massachusetts ===
	1	2	3	4	Total
Appalachian State	7	7	0	14	28
Massachusetts	7	0	7	3	17

== Rankings ==
Ranking movements Legend: ██ Increase in ranking ██ Decrease in ranking
	Week													
Poll	Pre	1	2	3	4	5	6	7	8	9	10	11	12	Final
The Sports Network	1	1	2	2	2	2	2	2	1	1	1	1	1	1

== Awards and honors ==
- Southern Conference Coach of the Year (coaches and media) — Jerry Moore
- Southern Conference Roy M. "Legs" Hawley Offensive Player of the Year (media) — Kevin Richardson
- Southern Conference Offensive Player of the Year (coaches) — Kevin Richardson
- Southern Conference Defensive Player of the Year (coaches) — Marques Murrell
- Southern Conference Freshman of the Year (coaches and media) — Armanti Edwards
- Southern Conference Jacobs Blocking Trophy — Kerry Brown

== Statistics ==
=== Team ===
	ASU	Opp
Scoring	528	223
Points per game	35.2	14.9
First downs	319	214
Rushing	194	84
Passing	107	111
Penalty	18	19
Total offense	6,265	4,154
Avg per play	6.2	4.4
Avg per game	417.7	276.9
Fumbles–Lost	34–16	27–13
Penalties–Yards	99–918	75–618
Avg per game	61.2	41.2

	ASU	Opp
Punts–Yards	56–2,075	92–3,405
Avg per punt	37.1	37.0
Time of possession/Game	31:01	29:54
3rd down conversions	82 for 188	65 for 219
4th down conversions	15 for 25	9 for 28
Touchdowns scored	71	27
Field goals–Attempts	10–14	10–26
PAT–Attempts	70–71	25–25
Attendance	184,911	108,140
Games/Avg per Game	9/20,546	5/21,628

==== Scores by quarter ====
	1	2	3	4	OT	Total
Opponents	32	45	73	70	3	223
Mountaineers	126	167	120	105	10	528

2006 statistics at GoASU
