= 2006 Chattanooga Mocs football team =

American college football season

2006 Chattanooga Mocs football
- Conference: Southern Conference
- Record: 3–8 (2–5 SoCon)
- Head coach: Rodney Allison (4th season)
- Offensive coordinator: Carmen Felus (1st season)
- Defensive coordinator: Billy Taylor (2nd season)
- Home stadium: Finley Stadium

2006 Southern Conference football standings
	Conf.			Overall
Team	W		L	W		L
No. 1 Appalachian State $^	7	–	0	14	–	1
No. 12 Furman ^	6	–	1	8	–	4
No. 23 Wofford	5	–	2	7	–	4
The Citadel	4	–	3	5	–	6
Elon	2	–	5	5	–	6
Chattanooga	2	–	5	3	–	8
Georgia Southern	2	–	5	3	–	8
Western Carolina	0	–	7	2	–	9
$ – Conference champion; ^ – FCS playoff participant; Rankings from The Sports Network FCS Poll

The 2006 Chattanooga Mocs football team represented the University of Tennessee at Chattanooga as a member of the Southern Conference (SoCon) in the 2006 NCAA Division I FCS football season. The Mocs were led by fourth-year head coach Rodney Allison and played their home games at Finley Stadium. They finished the season 3–8 overall and 2–5 in SoCon play to place fifth.

== Schedule ==
Date	Time	Opponent	Site	Result	Attendance	Source
August 31	8:00 p.m.	at Tennessee Tech*	Tucker Stadium; Cookeville, TN	W 31–7	7,868	
September 9	7:00 p.m.	at Memphis*	Liberty Bowl Memorial Stadium; Memphis, TN	L 14–33	34,419	
September 16	7:00 p.m.	at Western Kentucky*	L. T. Smith Stadium; Bowling Green, KY	L 21–28	9,322	
September 23	6:00 p.m.	No. 19 Georgia Southern	Finley Stadium; Chattanooga, TN	W 27–26	8,228	
September 30	2:00 p.m.	at The Citadel	Johnson Hagood Stadium; Charleston, SC	L 21–24	12,575	
October 7	6:00 p.m.	No. 2 Appalachian State^{†}	Finley Stadium; Chattanooga, TN	L 21–56	8,887	
October 14	3:30 p.m.	at Western Carolina	Whitmire Stadium; Cullowhee, NC	W 17–14 ^{OT}	8,540	
October 21	2:00 p.m.	at No. 8 Furman	Paladin Stadium; Greenville, SC	L 22–28 ^{OT}	12,740	
October 28	6:00 p.m.	Elon	Finley Stadium; Chattanooga, TN	L 17–20	5,626	
November 4	6:00 p.m.	Jacksonville State*	Finley Stadium; Chattanooga, TN	L 10–13	7,187	
November 11	1:30 p.m.	at Wofford	Gibbs Stadium; Spartanburg, SC	L 0–55	6,155	
*Non-conference game; ^{†}Homecoming; Rankings from The Sports Network Poll released prior to the game; All times are in Eastern time
