= 2006 Wofford Terriers football team =

American college football season

2006 Wofford Terriers football
- Conference: Southern Conference

Ranking
- Sports Network: No. 23
- Record: 7–4 (5–2 SoCon)
- Head coach: Mike Ayers (19th season)
- Home stadium: Gibbs Stadium

2006 Southern Conference football standings
	Conf.			Overall
Team	W		L	W		L
No. 1 Appalachian State $^	7	–	0	14	–	1
No. 12 Furman ^	6	–	1	8	–	4
No. 23 Wofford	5	–	2	7	–	4
The Citadel	4	–	3	5	–	6
Elon	2	–	5	5	–	6
Chattanooga	2	–	5	3	–	8
Georgia Southern	2	–	5	3	–	8
Western Carolina	0	–	7	2	–	9
$ – Conference champion; ^ – FCS playoff participant; Rankings from The Sports Network FCS Poll

The 2006 Wofford Terriers football team was an American football team that represented Wofford College as a member of the Southern Conference (SoCon) during the 2006 NCAA Division I FCS football season. Led by 19th-year head coach Mike Ayers, the Terriers compiled and overall record of 7–4, with a mark of 5–2 in conference play, and finished third in the SoCon.

== Schedule ==
Date	Time	Opponent	Site	TV	Result	Attendance	Source
September 2	7:00 p.m.	South Carolina State*	Gibbs Stadium; Spartanburg, SC		W 28–21	11,738	
September 9	7:00 p.m.	Coastal Carolina*	Gibbs Stadium; Spartanburg, SC		L 38–41	6,493	
September 16	7:00 p.m.	at South Carolina*	Williams–Brice Stadium; Columbia, SC	PPV	L 20–27	74,286	
September 30	3:30 p.m.	No. 3 Furman	Gibbs Stadium; Spartanburg, SC (rivalry)	CSS	L 21–35	9,107	
October 7	1:30 p.m.	The Citadel	Gibbs Stadium; Spartanburg, SC (rivalry)	SCETV	W 28–20	9,437	
October 14	3:30 p.m.	at No. 2 Appalachian State	Kidd Brewer Stadium; Boone, NC		L 7–14	18,758	
October 21	2:00 p.m.	at Elon	Rhodes Stadium; Elon, NC		W 35–21	5,624	
October 28	1:30 p.m.	Western Carolina	Gibbs Stadium; Spartanburg, SC		W 35–7	7,072	
November 4	1:00 p.m.	at Georgia Southern	Paulson Stadium; Statesboro, GA		W 28–10	12,486	
November 11	1:30 p.m.	Chattanooga	Gibbs Stadium; Spartanburg, SC		W 55–0	6,155	
November 18	1:30 p.m.	at Gardner–Webb*	Ernest W. Spangler Stadium; Boiling Springs, NC		W 34–17	3,112	
*Non-conference game; Rankings from The Sports Network Poll released prior to the game; All times are in Eastern time
