= Tomahawks Field =

Outdoor Stadium in Japan

- Interactive map of Tomahawks Field
- Location: 4-1 Kizuki-omachi; Tokyo, Japan
- Coordinates: 35°34′20″N 139°38′54″E
- Owner: Hosei University
- Operator: Hosei University
- Surface: FieldTurf (blue) 2012–present

Construction
- Opened: June 10, 2012; 14 years ago

Tenant
- Hosei Tomahawks (JAFA) (2012–present)

Tomahawks Field (Japan)

Tomahawks Field was an outdoor athletic stadium in Tokyo, Japan, the home field of the Hosei Orange of the Kantoh Collegiate American Football Association. With permission, and assistance, from Boise State University, Hosei is the first university to have a blue turf playing surface granted to them under the first international licensing of the playing surface through a Boise State trademark.

== See also ==
- List of college football stadiums with non-traditional field colors
