= 2006 VMI Keydets football team =

American college football season

2006 VMI Keydets football
- Conference: Big South Conference
- Record: 1–10 (0–4 Big South)
- Head coach: Jim Reid (1st season)
- Offensive coordinator: Brent Davis (1st season)
- Offensive scheme: Option
- Defensive coordinator: Vince Sinagra (1st season)
- Base defense: 4–3
- Home stadium: Alumni Memorial Field

2006 Big South Conference football standings
	Conf.			Overall
Team	W		L	W		L
No. 14 Coastal Carolina $^	4	–	0	9	–	3
Charleston Southern	2	–	2	9	–	2
Gardner–Webb	2	–	2	6	–	5
Liberty	2	–	2	6	–	5
VMI	0	–	4	1	–	10
$ – Conference champion; ^ – FCS playoff participant; Rankings from The Sports Network poll

The 2006 VMI Keydets football team represented the Virginia Military Institute during the 2006 NCAA Division I FCS football season. It was the Keydets' 116th year of football, and their 4th season in the Big South Conference.

Following the firing of former coach Cal McCombs, who headed the VMI football team from 1999 to 2005, the Keydets announced they hired Jim Reid as their new head coach on December 22, 2005. After winning the first game of the season over Davidson 20–19, VMI went winless through the rest of the year, dropping 10 straight games, including all four in conference play.

== Schedule ==
Date	Time	Opponent	Site	Result	Attendance	Source
September 2	1:00 pm	Davidson*	Alumni Memorial Field; Lexington, VA	W 20–19	8,112	
September 9	6:00 pm	at Norfolk State*	William "Dick" Price Stadium; Norfolk, VA	L 19–32	12,609	
September 16	3:00 pm	at No. 8 Richmond*	University of Richmond Stadium; Richmond, VA	L 7–58	10,560	
September 23	7:00 pm	at William & Mary*	Zable Stadium; Williamsburg, VA (rivalry)	L 6–38	10,208	
September 30	1:00 pm	No. 15 James Madison*	Foster Stadium; Lexington, VA	L 7–45	8,830	
October 7	1:05 pm	at Army*	Michie Stadium; West Point, NY	L 7–62	31,069	
October 14	1:00 pm	Coastal Carolina	Alumni Memorial Field; Lexington, VA	L 27–31	7,810	
October 21	1:30 pm	at Charleston Southern	Buccaneer Field; North Charleston, SC	L 22–27	3,258	
October 28	1:30 pm	at Gardner–Webb	Spangler Stadium; Boiling Springs, NC	L 31–35	3,810	
November 11	2:00 pm	at The Citadel*	Johnson Hagood Stadium; Charleston, SC (Military Classic of the South)	L 21–48	17,494	
November 18	1:00 pm	Liberty	Alumni Memorial Field; Lexington, VA	L 32–38	6,177	
*Non-conference game; Rankings from The Sports Network Poll released prior to the game; All times are in Eastern time
