= 2006 The Citadel Bulldogs football team =

American college football season

2006 The Citadel Bulldogs football
- Conference: Southern Conference
- Record: 5–6 (4–3 SoCon)
- Head coach: Kevin Higgins (2nd season)
- Defensive coordinator: Isaac Collins (1st season)
- Home stadium: Johnson Hagood Stadium

2006 Southern Conference football standings
	Conf.			Overall
Team	W		L	W		L
No. 1 Appalachian State $^	7	–	0	14	–	1
No. 12 Furman ^	6	–	1	8	–	4
No. 23 Wofford	5	–	2	7	–	4
The Citadel	4	–	3	5	–	6
Elon	2	–	5	5	–	6
Chattanooga	2	–	5	3	–	8
Georgia Southern	2	–	5	3	–	8
Western Carolina	0	–	7	2	–	9
$ – Conference champion; ^ – FCS playoff participant; Rankings from The Sports Network FCS Poll

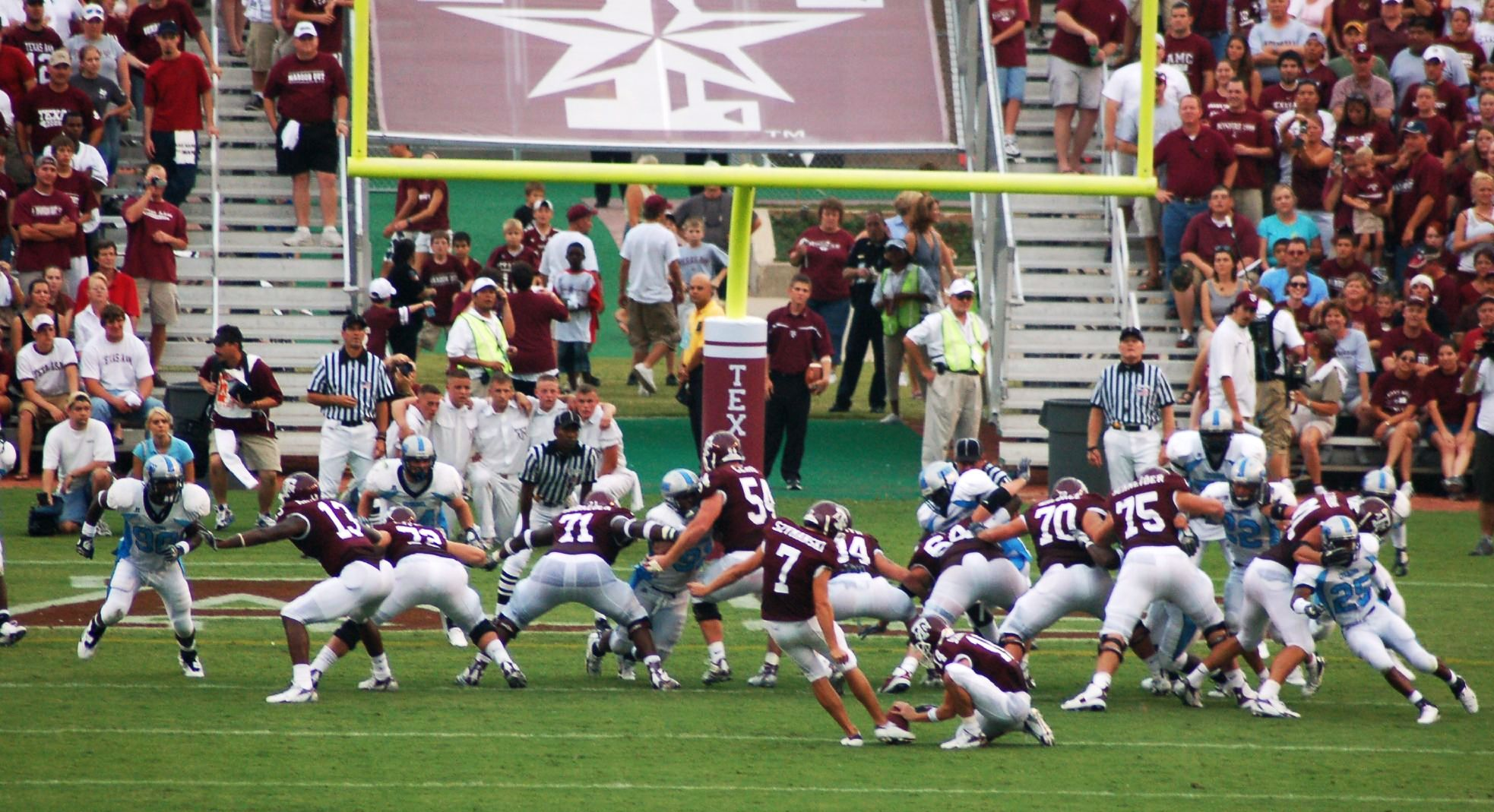
Matt Szymanski kicking an extra point at the 2006 Texas A&M vs. The Citadel college football game

The 2006 The Citadel Bulldogs football team represented The Citadel, The Military College of South Carolina in the 2006 NCAA Division I FCS football season. Kevin Higgins served as head coach for the second season. The Bulldogs played as members of the Southern Conference and played home games at Johnson Hagood Stadium.

== Schedule ==
Date	Time	Opponent	Site	TV	Result	Attendance	Source
September 2	7:00 pm	at Texas A&M*	Kyle Field; College Station, TX		L 3–35	70,104	
September 9	7:00 pm	Charleston Southern*	Johnson Hagood Stadium; Charleston, SC	BI	L 35–38 ^{2OT}	15,121	
September 23	1:30 pm	at Pittsburgh*	Heinz Field; Pittsburgh, PA	ESPN360	L 6–51	30,069	
September 30	2:00 pm	Chattanooga	Johnson Hagood Stadium; Charleston, SC	BI	W 24–21	12,575	
October 7	1:30 pm	at Wofford	Gibbs Stadium; Spartanburg, SC (rivalry)	SCETV	L 20–28	9,437	
October 14	2:00 pm	at No. 11 Furman	Paladin Stadium; Greenville, SC (rivalry)		L 17–23	13,427	
October 21	2:00 pm	Western Carolina	Johnson Hagood Stadium; Charleston, SC	BI	W 30–27 ^{OT}	15,495	
October 28	2:00 pm	Georgia Southern	Johnson Hagood Stadium; Charleston, SC		W 24–21	12,129	
November 4	3:30 pm	at No. 1 Appalachian State	Kidd Brewer Stadium; Boone, NC		L 13–42	17,547	
November 11	2:00 pm	VMI*^{†}	Johnson Hagood Stadium; Charleston, SC (Military Classic of the South)		W 48–21	17,494	
November 18	5:00 pm	at Elon	Rhodes Stadium; Elon, NC		W 44–7	3,716	
*Non-conference game; ^{†}Homecoming; Rankings from The Sports Network Poll released prior to the game; All times are in Eastern time
