= 2006 Western Carolina Catamounts football team =

American college football season

2006 Western Carolina Catamounts football
- Conference: Southern Conference
- Record: 2–9 (0–7 SoCon)
- Head coach: Kent Briggs (5th season)
- Defensive coordinator: Don Powers (1st season)
- Home stadium: Bob Waters Field at E. J. Whitmire Stadium

2006 Southern Conference football standings
	Conf.			Overall
Team	W		L	W		L
No. 1 Appalachian State $^	7	–	0	14	–	1
No. 12 Furman ^	6	–	1	8	–	4
No. 23 Wofford	5	–	2	7	–	4
The Citadel	4	–	3	5	–	6
Elon	2	–	5	5	–	6
Chattanooga	2	–	5	3	–	8
Georgia Southern	2	–	5	3	–	8
Western Carolina	0	–	7	2	–	9
$ – Conference champion; ^ – FCS playoff participant; Rankings from The Sports Network FCS Poll

The 2006 Western Carolina Catamounts team represented Western Carolina University as a member of the Southern Conference (SoCon) during the 2006 NCAA Division I FCS football season. Led by fifth-year head coach Kent Briggs, the Catamounts compiled an overall record of 2–9 with a mark of 0–7 in conference play, placing last out of eight teams in the SoCon. Western Carolina played home games at Bob Waters Field at E. J. Whitmire Stadium in Cullowhee, North Carolina.

== Schedule ==
Date	Time	Opponent	Rank	Site	TV	Result	Attendance	Source
August 31	7:00 p.m.	Chowan*		Bob Waters Field at E. J. Whitmire Stadium; Cullowhee, NC		W 42–0	3,014	
September 16	6:00 p.m.	Eastern Kentucky*		Bob Waters Field at E. J. Whitmire Stadium; Cullowhee, NC		W 20–17	8,247	
September 23	7:00 p.m.	at No. 3 Furman	No. 22	Paladin Stadium; Greenville, SC	CSS	L 7–42	14,232	
September 30	6:00 p.m.	No. 25 Georgia Southern	No. 24	Bob Waters Field at E. J. Whitmire Stadium; Cullowhee, NC		L 14–24	10,483	
October 7	2:00 p.m.	at Elon		Rhodes Stadium; Elon, NC		L 19–37	4,374	
October 14	3:30 p.m.	Chattanooga^{†}		Bob Waters Field at E. J. Whitmire Stadium; Cullowhee, NC		L 14–17 ^{OT}	8,540	
October 21	2:00 p.m.	at The Citadel		Johnson Hagood Stadium; Charleston, SC		L 27–30 ^{OT}	15,495	
October 28	1:30 p.m.	at Wofford		Gibbs Stadium; Spartanburg, SC		L 7–35	7,072	
November 4	1:00 p.m.	at Liberty*		Williams Stadium; Lynchburg, VA		L 0–21	8,286	
November 11	4:00 p.m.	No. 1 Appalachian State		Bob Waters Field at E. J. Whitmire Stadium; Cullowhee, NC (Battle for the Old Mountain Jug)		L 9–31	13,742	
November 18	12:00 p.m.	at No. 3 (FBS) Florida*		Ben Hill Griffin Stadium; Gainesville, FL	PPV	L 0–62	90,233	
*Non-conference game; ^{†}Homecoming; Rankings from The Sports Network Poll released prior to the game; All times are in Eastern time
