= 2006 Georgia Southern Eagles football team =

American college football season

2006 Georgia Southern Eagles football
- Conference: Southern Conference
- Record: 3–8 (2–5 SoCon)
- Head coach: Brian VanGorder (1st season)
- Offensive coordinator: Darin Hinshaw (1st season)
- Offensive scheme: Spread
- Defensive coordinator: Deion Melvin (1st season)
- Base defense: 4–3
- Home stadium: Paulson Stadium

2006 Southern Conference football standings
	Conf.			Overall
Team	W		L	W		L
No. 1 Appalachian State $^	7	–	0	14	–	1
No. 12 Furman ^	6	–	1	8	–	4
No. 23 Wofford	5	–	2	7	–	4
The Citadel	4	–	3	5	–	6
Elon	2	–	5	5	–	6
Chattanooga	2	–	5	3	–	8
Georgia Southern	2	–	5	3	–	8
Western Carolina	0	–	7	2	–	9
$ – Conference champion; ^ – FCS playoff participant; Rankings from The Sports Network FCS Poll

The 2006 Georgia Southern Eagles football team represented the Georgia Southern Eagles of Georgia Southern University during the 2006 NCAA Division I-AA football season. The Eagles played their home games at Paulson Stadium in Statesboro, Georgia. The team was coached by Brian VanGorder, in his first and only year as head coach for the Eagles.

On the Friday morning prior to the first game of the season, former Georgia Southern head coach Erk Russell died aged 80 from a stroke. Russell had addressed the team on the night before.

== Schedule ==
Date	Time	Opponent	Rank	Site	TV	Result	Attendance	Source
September 9	7:00 pm	Central Connecticut*	No. 13	Paulson Stadium; Statesboro, GA		L 13–17	20,178	
September 16	7:00 pm	Coastal Carolina*	No. 24	Paulson Stadium; Statesboro, GA		W 38–21	17,303	
September 23	6:00 pm	at Chattanooga	No. 19	Finley Stadium; Chattanooga, TN		L 26–27	8,228	
September 30	6:00 pm	at No. 24 Western Carolina		E.J. Whitmire Stadium; Cullowhee, NC		W 24–14	10,483	
October 7	1:00 pm	No. 11 North Dakota State*	No. 21	Paulson Stadium; Statesboro, GA		L 14–34	13,892	
October 14	1:00 pm	Elon		Paulson Stadium; Statesboro, GA		W 28–21	14,825	
October 21	12:00 pm	No. 1 Appalachian State		Paulson Stadium; Statesboro, GA (rivalry)	SportSouth	L 20–27 ^{2OT}	19,438	
October 28	2:00 pm	at The Citadel		Johnson Hagood Stadium; Charleston, SC		L 21–24	12,129	
November 4	1:00 pm	Wofford		Paulson Stadium; Statesboro, GA		L 10–28	12,486	
November 11	3:30 pm	at No. 8 Furman		Paladin Stadium; Greenville, SC	CSS	L 10–13	13,287	
November 18	1:00 pm	Central Arkansas*		Paulson Stadium; Statesboro, GA		L 31–34 ^{OT}	11,159	
*Non-conference game; Rankings from The Sports Network Poll released prior to the game; All times are in Eastern time
