= Hosei Orange football =

- First season: 1935
- Location: Tokyo, Japan
- Stadium: Tomahawks Field
- Conference: Kantoh Collegiate American Football Association
- Division: Top 8
- Colors: Blue and Orange
- Outfitter: Under Armour
- Website: Hosei Orange American Football Team

The Hosei Orange football program represents Hosei University in college football. They are members of the Top 8 in the Kantoh Collegiate American Football Association.

== Name ==
In January 2017 the club's sponsor, Dome Corporation, announced that the name "Tomahawks" would be replaced by "Orange".

== Tomahawks Field ==
With permission and assistance from Boise State University, Hosei is the first university in Japan to have a blue turf playing surface granted to them under the first international licensing of the playing surface through a Boise State trademark.
