= Brooks Stadium =

Football stadium at Coastal Carolina University

- Surf Turf
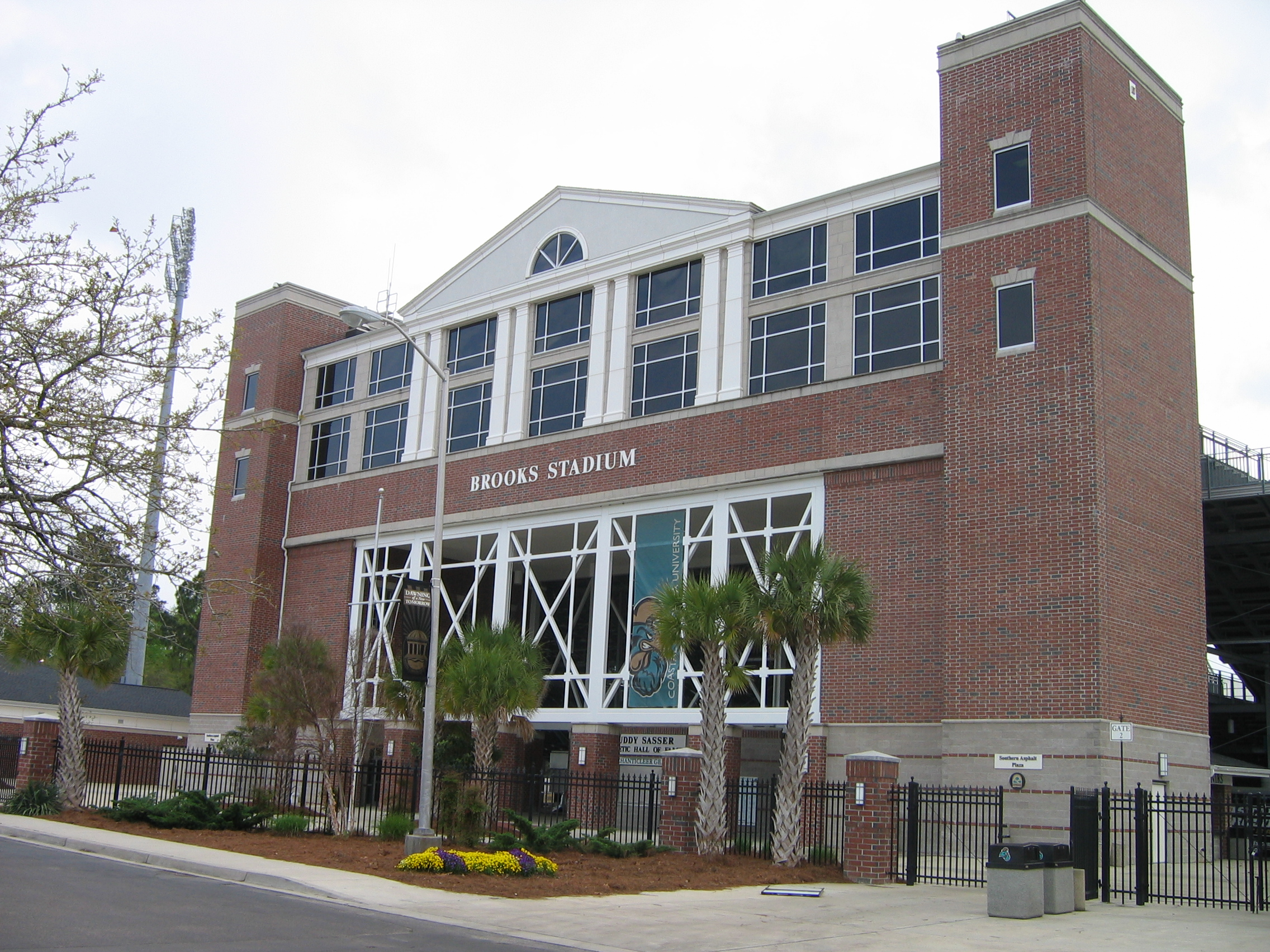
- Exterior view of the stadium in 2008

- Location in South Carolina Location in the United States
- Full name: Brooks Stadium - James C. Benton Field
- Address: 540 University Blvd
- Location: Conway, South Carolina
- Coordinates: 33.7929°N 79.0175°W
- Owner: Coastal Carolina University
- Operator: Coastal Carolina University
- Capacity: 21,000 (2019–present); 15,000 (2017–2018); 9,214 (2012–2016); 9,112 (2010–2011); 7,322 (2006–2009); 6,408 (2003–2005)
- Surface: Shaw Sports PowerBlade (teal) (2015–present); Grass (2003–2014)
- Record attendance: 22,217 (September 6, 2025 vs. Charleston Southern)

Construction
- Groundbreaking: July 30, 2002
- Opened: September 6, 2003; 23 years ago
- Renovated: 2017–2019
- Expanded: 2010, 2017–2019
- Cost: $59 Million
- Architects: McMillan Smith & Partners
- General contractor: Hill Construction

Tenants
- Coastal Carolina Chanticleers football (NCAA) (2003–present); Myrtle Beach Bowl (NCAA) (2020–present)

Website
- goccusports.com/brooks-stadium

Brooks Stadium is a 21,000-seat multi-purpose stadium in Conway, South Carolina. It is home to the Coastal Carolina Chanticleers football team at Coastal Carolina University. The facility opened in 2003 and is named in honor of Coby Garrett Brooks and Boni Belle Brooks, children of Robert Brooks. Brooks was a Loris, South Carolina native and was the chairman of Hooters of America, Inc. The stadium is notable for its teal artificial turf.

== History and renovation ==
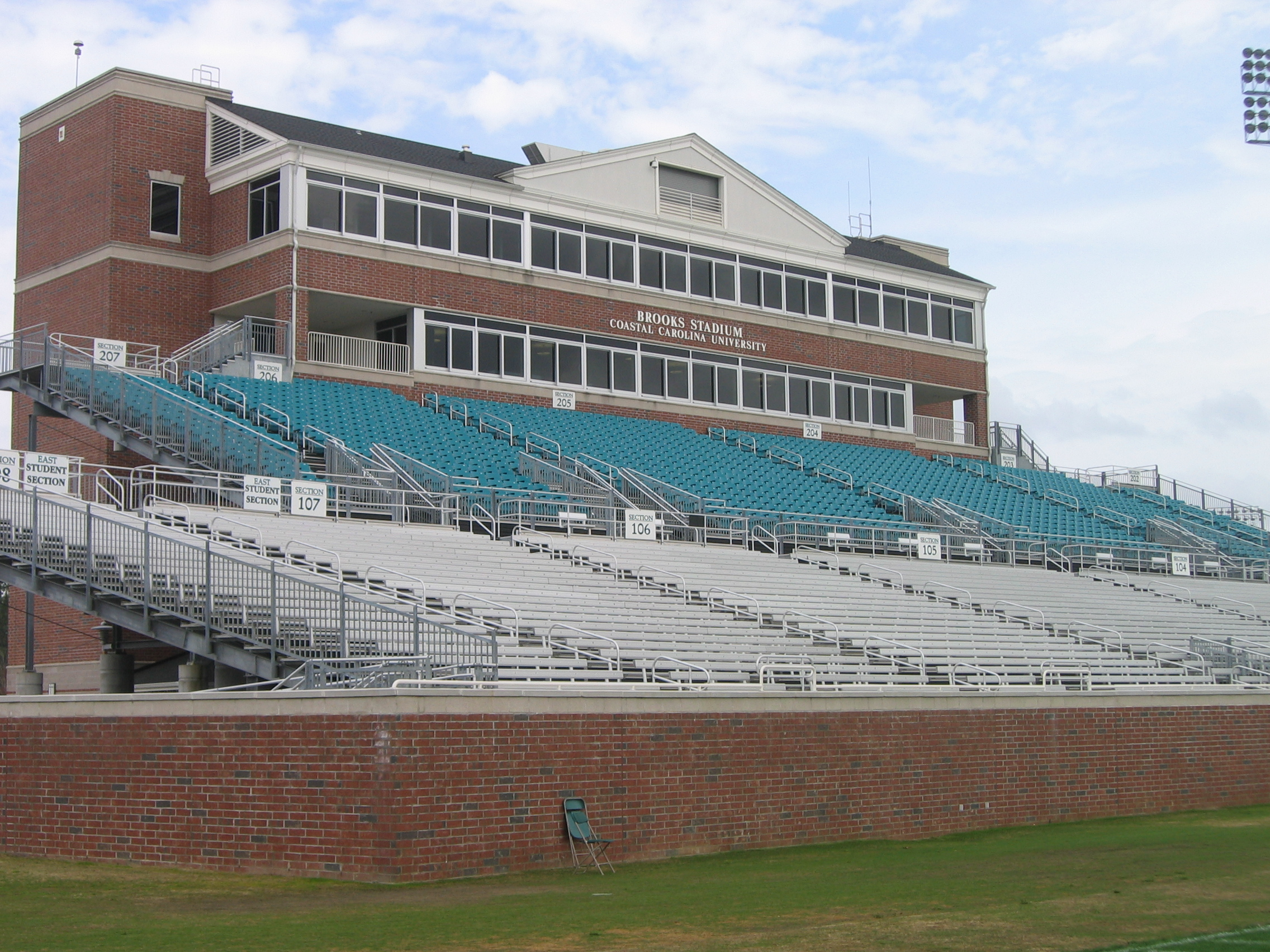
Home stands in 2007

While the current stadium dates only to 2003, the site has a considerably longer football history. In a 2020 interview, Coastal athletic director Matt Hogue, who began working at the school in 1997 as Coastal's basketball play-by-play announcer, told ESPN journalist Ryan McGee,

When I started working here, that was the location of Conway High School's football stadium. They decided to build a new stadium on their campus, so it left that lot open for us. But it sat there empty for seven or eight months between their last game and our groundbreaking, so it was completely overgrown with weeds and watermelons. . . . When we went out there to get ready for the groundbreaking ceremony, there were wild watermelons all over the place. So, we had to work around that.

Groundbreaking for Brooks Stadium was held on July 30, 2002. Phase I of the stadium construction contained 6,408 seats, while the foundation and infrastructure of the stadium was designed to support future expansion to 20,000 seats. The stadium was formally dedicated on September 6, 2003, as the Chanticleer football team opened its inaugural game vs. Newberry College in front of a crowd of more than 8,000. On October 6, 2006, the field was named James C. Benton Field to honor the family for a large donation they made to the Coastal athletics program earlier in the year.

== 2017–19 expansion ==
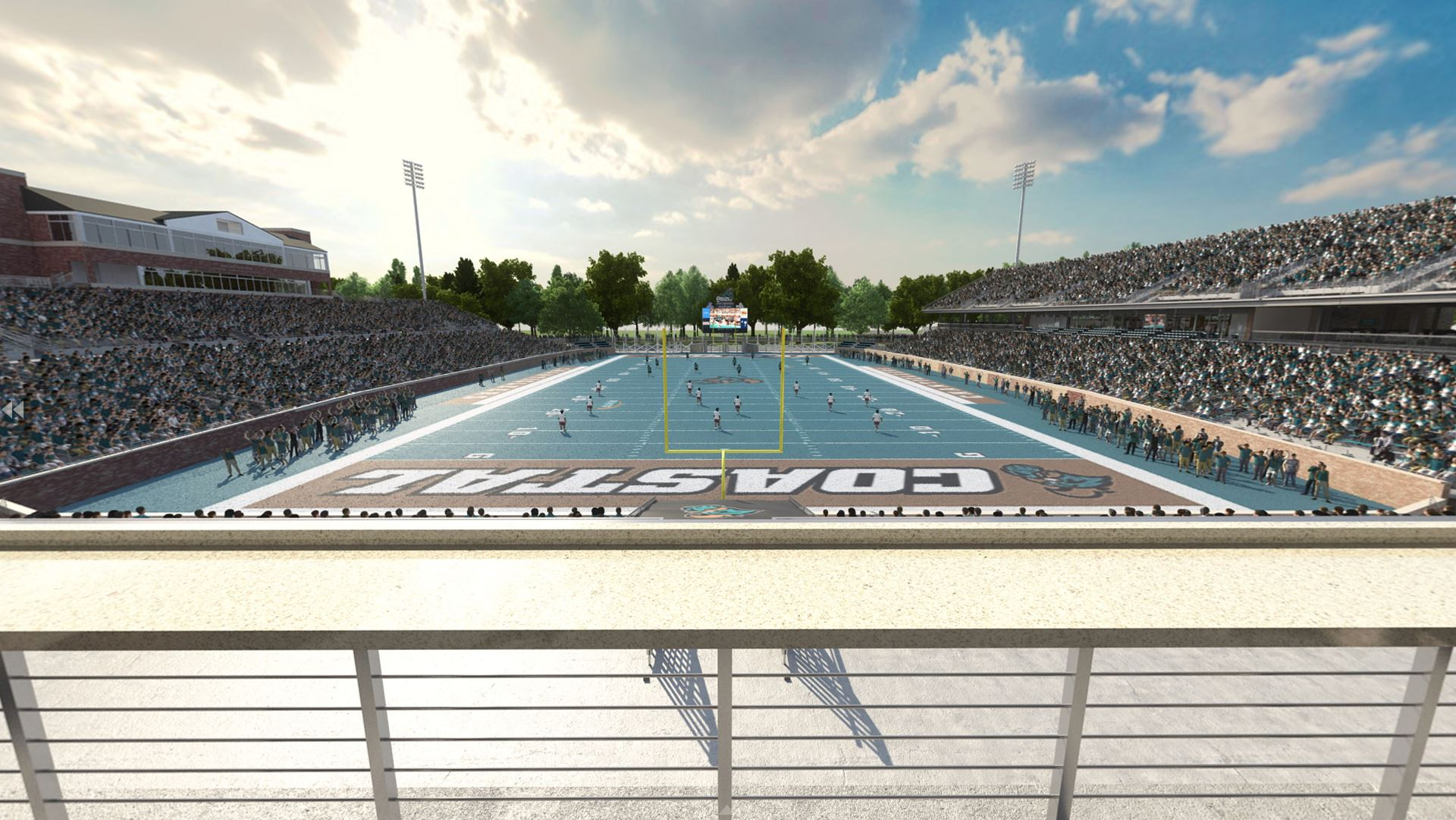
Rendering of Brooks Stadium following expansion

Following the announcement of the university joining the Sun Belt Conference on September 1, 2015, Brooks Stadium underwent construction to expand the stadium to 20,000 seats. The NCAA requires FBS programs to maintain an average attendance of at least 15,000 over a rolling two-year cycle. The expansion project received approval from the state in November 2015, but construction was not expected to begin until January 2017. Coastal Carolina University officials set the project price tag at $38 million. The committee also announced in February 2017 the lead architects for the expansion were Heery International, Inc. architectural firm and Stubbs Muldrow Herin architects. McKnight Construction Company was awarded the project, and groundbreaking took place on March 21, 2017. Construction took place over two phases; the first phase expanded the stadium to the FBS-minimum 15,000 seats by expanding the sidelines and connecting them to the north end zone as well as expanding the press box side upper deck. It was completed in time for Coastal Carolina's season opener against UMass on September 2, 2017. Construction of phase II began in January 2018, and further expanded capacity to over 20,000 seats by adding premium seating and an upper deck to the west side. Phase II was finished in August 2019.

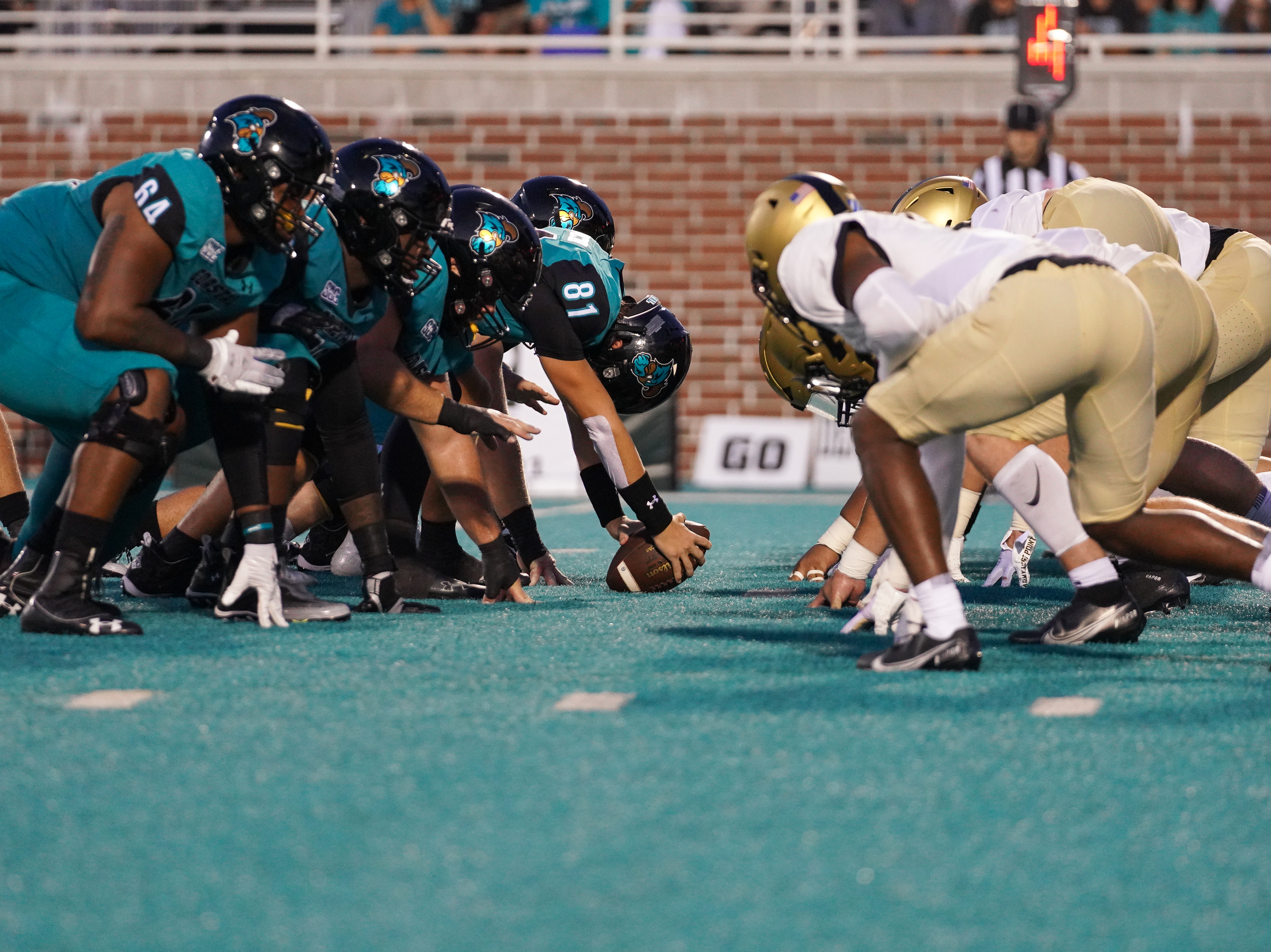
The Coastal Carolina (left) and Army football teams line up on the Stadium's teal turf during a game in 2022.

== Marrio & Josh Norman Fieldhouse ==
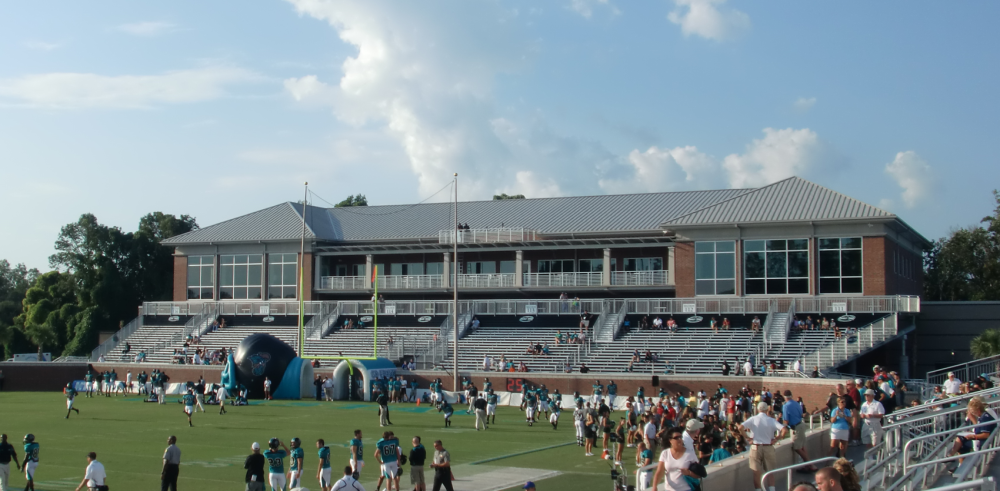
Adkins Fieldhouse, located in the north endzone in 2010 (Now the Marrio & Josh Norman Fieldhouse)

The $8.5 million fieldhouse opened at Brooks Stadium in June 2010. It was originally named for brothers Mark and Will Adkins (Coastal Carolina '89), who planned to donate $1.5 million to the project. The fieldhouse added 1,600 seats.

On November 3, 2018, it was announced that Josh Norman had donated a large amount of money to the athletic department and the Adkins Fieldhouse name changed to Marrio & Josh Norman Fieldhouse.

The Marrio & Josh Norman Fieldhouse also includes houses:

- Football offices, meeting rooms, and football locker room
- 13,000-square-foot (1,200 m^{2}) Strength & conditioning center for all student-athletes
- Men's and women's cross country and track & field offices
- Men's and women's soccer offices
- Men's and women's golf offices
- Men's tennis office
- Baseball office
- Softball office
- Sasser Athletic Hall of Fame

== Attendance records ==
Rank	Attendance	Date	Game Result
1	22,217	September 6, 2025	Coastal Carolina 13, Charleston Southern 0
2	22,104	September 21, 2024	Coastal Carolina 24, Virginia 43
3	21,634	September 13, 2025	Coastal Carolina 0, East Carolina 38
4	21,324	October 28, 2023	Coastal Carolina 34, Marshall 6
5	21,224	November 3, 2022	Coastal Carolina 35, Appalachian State 28
6	21,165	September 3, 2022	Coastal Carolina 38, Army 28
7	19,415	November 7, 2024	Coastal Carolina 38, Appalachian State 24
8	19,294	September 7, 2024	Coastal Carolina 40, William & Mary 21
9	18,756	October 1, 2022	Coastal Carolina 34, Georgia Southern 30
10	18,674	October 2, 2021	#16 Coastal Carolina 59, Louisiana–Monroe 6

== See also ==
- List of NCAA Division I FBS football stadiums
