= 1996 Marshall Thundering Herd football team =

American college football season

1996 Marshall Thundering Herd football

NCAA Division I-AA champion SoCon champion

NCAA Division I-AA Championship Game, W 49–29 vs. Montana
- Conference: Southern Conference

Ranking
- Sports Network: No. 1
- Record: 15–0 (8–0 SoCon)
- Head coach: Bob Pruett (1st season)
- Co-offensive coordinators: Gunter Brewer (1st season); Larry Kueck (1st season)
- Offensive scheme: Spread
- Defensive coordinator: Kevin Kelly (1st season)
- Base defense: 3–4
- Captains: Eric Kresser; Tim Martin; Aaron Ferguson; Melvin Cunningham; Billy Lyon; Jermaine Swafford
- Home stadium: Marshall University Stadium

Uniform
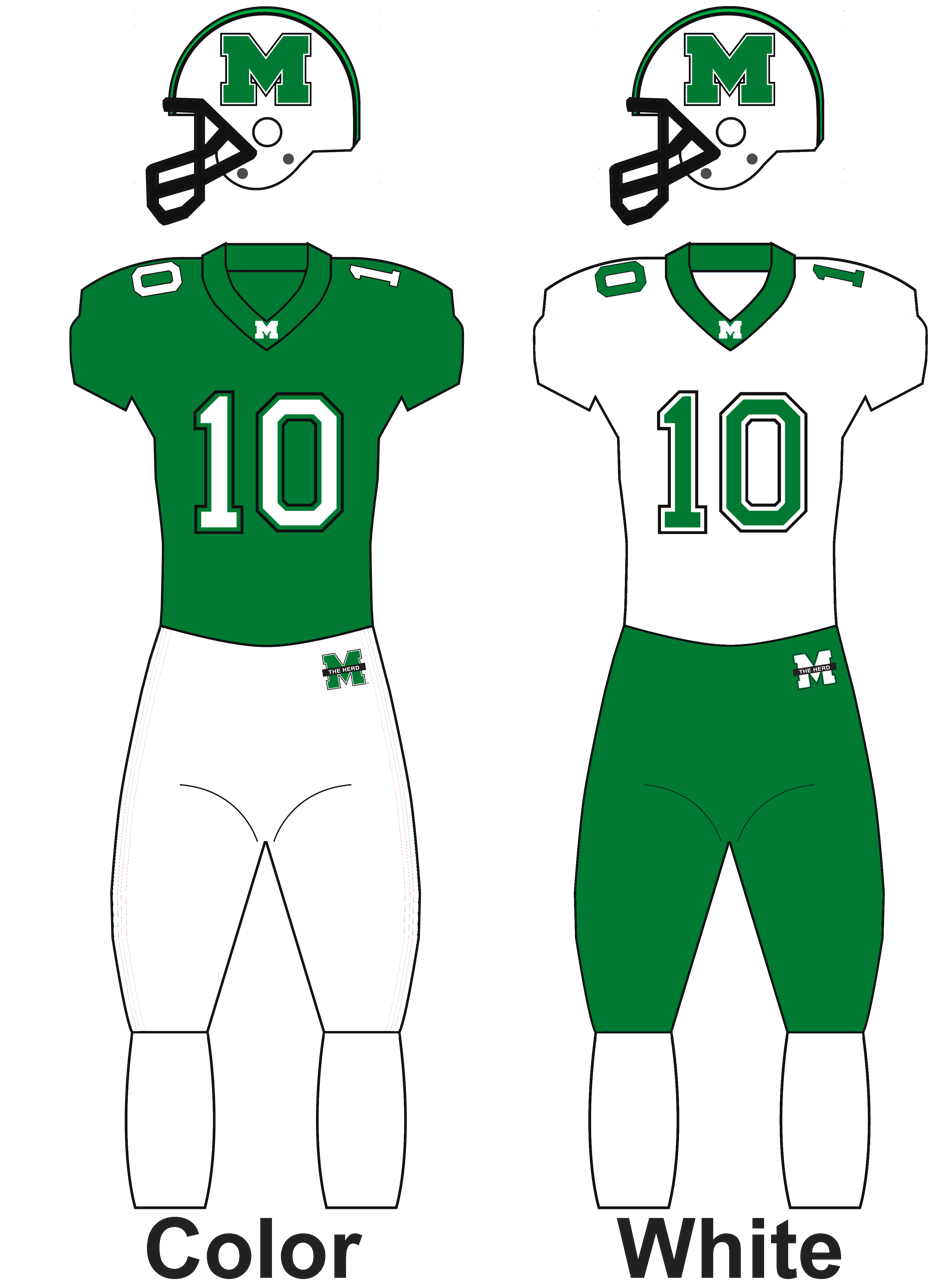

1996 Southern Conference football standings
	Conf.			Overall
Team	W		L	W		L
No. 1 Marshall $^	8	–	0	15	–	0
No. T–8 East Tennessee State ^	7	–	1	10	–	3
No. 13 Furman ^	6	–	2	9	–	4
No. 25 Appalachian State	5	–	3	7	–	4
The Citadel	3	–	5	4	–	7
Georgia Southern	2	–	6	4	–	7
VMI	2	–	6	3	–	8
Chattanooga	2	–	6	3	–	8
Western Carolina	1	–	7	4	–	7
$ – Conference champion; Rankings from The Sports Network poll

The 1996 Marshall Thundering Herd football team represented Marshall University as a member of Southern Conference (SoCon) during the 1996 NCAA Division I-AA football season. Led by first-year head coach Bob Pruett, the Thundering Herd compiled an overall record of 15–0 with mark of 8–0 in conference play, winning the SoCon title. Marshall advanced to the NCAA Division I-AA National Championship playoffs, where they beat Delaware in the first round, Furman in the quarterfinals, Northern Iowa in the semifinals, and Montana in the NCAA Division I-AA Championship Game to win the program's second NCAA Division I-AA title. 1996 was Marshall's final season competing at the NCAA Division I-AA level as they moved to NCAA Division I-A competition and joined the Mid-American Conference (MAC) in 1997.

== Schedule ==
Date	Time	Opponent	Rank	Site	TV	Result	Attendance	Source
September 7	7:00 pm	Howard*	No. 1	Marshall University Stadium; Huntington, WV		W 55–27	26,054	
September 14	7:00 pm	West Virginia State*	No. 1	Marshall University Stadium; Huntington, WV		W 42–7	21,851	
September 21	3:30 pm	at No. 13 Georgia Southern	No. 1	Paulson Stadium; Statesboro, GA	WSAZ	W 29–13	13,977	
September 28	7:00 pm	No. 12 Western Kentucky*	No. 1	Marshall University Stadium; Huntington, WV		W 37–3	20,755	
October 5	7:00 pm	Chattanooga	No. 1	Marshall University Stadium; Huntington, WV	WSAZ	W 45–0	22,078	
October 12	1:00 pm	at VMI	No. 1	Alumni Memorial Field; Lexington, VA		W 45–20	9,165	
October 19	7:00 pm	Western Carolina	No. 1	Marshall University Stadium; Huntington, WV	WSAZ	W 56–21	19,330	
October 26	1:00 pm	at No. 20 Appalachian State	No. 1	Kidd Brewer Stadium; Boone, NC (rivalry)	SS	W 24–10	23,458	
November 2	1:00 pm	The Citadel^{†}	No. 1	Marshall University Stadium; Huntington, WV	WSAZ	W 56–25	21,038	
November 9	2:00 pm	at No. 7 East Tennessee State	No. 1	Memorial Center; Johnson City, TN	WSAZ	W 34–10	13,131	
November 16	1:00 pm	No. 12 Furman	No. 1	Marshall University Stadium; Huntington, WV		W 42–17	22,615	
November 30	1:00 pm	No. 11 Delaware*	No. 1	Marshall University Stadium; Huntington, WV (NCAA Division I-AA First Round)	WSAZ	W 59–14	15,429	
December 7	1:00 pm	No. 13 Furman	No. 1	Marshall University Stadium; Huntington, WV (NCAA Division I-AA Quarterfinal)	WSAZ	W 54–0	14,096	
December 14	1:00 pm	No. 3 Northern Iowa*	No. 1	Marshall University Stadium; Huntington, WV (NCAA Division I-AA Semifinal)	WSAZ	W 31–14	14,414	
December 21	2:00 pm	No. 2 Montana*	No. 1	Marshall University Stadium; Huntington, WV (NCAA Division I-AA Championship Game)	ESPN	W 49–29	30,052	
*Non-conference game; ^{†}Homecoming; Rankings from The Sports Network Poll released prior to the game; All times are in Eastern time

== Game summaries ==
=== Howard ===
Howard at #1 Marshall

Team	1	2	3	4	Total
Bison	10	10	7	0	27
• Thundering Herd	10	14	24	7	55

- Date: September 7
- Location:
  Marshall Stadium
  Huntington, WV
- Game attendance: 26,054

=== West Virginia State ===
West Virginia State at #1 Marshall

Team	1	2	3	4	Total
Yellow Jackets	0	0	0	7	7
• Thundering Herd	21	14	7	0	42

- Date: September 14
- Location:
  Marshall Stadium
  Huntington, WV
- Game attendance: 21,851

=== at Georgia Southern ===
#1 Marshall at #13 Georgia Southern

Team	1	2	3	4	Total
• Thundering Herd	10	7	6	6	29
Eagles	0	7	6	0	13

- Date: September 21
- Location:
  Paulson Stadium
  Statesboro, GA
- Game attendance: 13,977

Scoring summary
1		Marshall	Tim Openlander 26-yard field goal	Marshall 3–0
1	4:08	Marshall	Randy Moss 42-yard pass from Eric Kresser (Openlander kick)	Marshall 10–0
1		GSU	Corey Johnson 1-yard run (kick)	Marshall 10–7
1	4:52	Marshall	Randy Moss 4-yard pass from Eric Kresser (Openlander kick)	Marshall 17–7
3		GSU	Grant Chestnut fumble recovery in end zone (kick failed)	Marshall 17–13
3		Marshall	Doug Chapman 3-yard run (conversion failed)	Marshall 23–13
4		Marshall	Jason Wellman 6-yard pass from Eric Kresser (conversion failed)	Marshall 29–13

=== Western Kentucky ===
#12 Western Kentucky at #1 Marshall

Team	1	2	3	4	Total
Hilltoppers	0	3	0	0	3
• Thundering Herd	10	7	6	14	37

- Date: September 28
- Location:
  Marshall Stadium
  Huntington, WV
- Game attendance: 20,755

Scoring summary
1	10:57	Marshall	Randy Moss 3-yard pass from Eric Kresser (Openlander kick)	Marshall 7-0
1	0:21	Marshall	Tim Openlander 22-yard field goal	Marshall 10–0
1	2:11	WKU	Jeff Poisel 37-yard field goal	Marshall 10–3
1	1:12	Marshall	Doug Chapman 19-yard run (Openlander kick)	Marshall 17–3
3	7:55	Marshall	Tim Openlander 42-yard field goal	Marshall 20–3
3	4:30	Marshall	Tim Openlander 37-yard field goal	Marshall 23–3
4	9:11	Marshall	Mark Wicks 35-yard pass from Eric Kresser (Openlander kick)	Marshall 30–3
4	1:49	Marshall	Llow Turner 15-yard run (Openlander kick)	Marshall 37–3

=== Chattanooga ===
Chattanooga at #1 Marshall

Team	1	2	3	4	Total
Mocs	0	0	0	0	0
• Thundering Herd	17	14	7	7	45

- Date: October 5
- Location:
  Marshall Stadium
  Huntington, WV
- Game attendance: 22,078

=== at VMI ===
#1 Marshall at VMI

Team	1	2	3	4	Total
• Thundering Herd	21	14	0	10	45
Keydets	7	0	10	3	20

- Date: October 12
- Location:
  Alumni Memorial Field
  Lexington, VA
- Game attendance: 9,165

=== Western Carolina ===
Western Carolina at #1 Marshall

Team	1	2	3	4	Total
Catamounts	0	7	7	7	21
• Thundering Herd	28	21	7	0	56

- Date: October 19
- Location:
  Marshall Stadium
  Huntington, WV
- Game attendance: 19,330

=== at Appalachian State ===
#1 Marshall at #20 Appalachian State

Team	1	2	3	4	Total
• Thundering Herd	7	0	10	7	24
Mountaineers	7	3	0	0	10

- Date: October 26
- Location:
  Kidd Brewer Stadium
  Boone, NC
- Game attendance: 23,458

=== The Citadel ===
The Citadel at #1 Marshall

Team	1	2	3	4	Total
Bulldogs	7	9	3	6	25
• Thundering Herd	7	14	14	21	56

- Date: November 2
- Location:
  Marshall Stadium
  Huntington, WV
- Game attendance: 21,038

=== at East Tennessee State ===
#1 Marshall at #7 East Tennessee State

Team	1	2	3	4	Total
• Thundering Herd	0	10	14	10	34
Buccaneers	3	0	0	7	10

- Date: November 9
- Location:
  Memorial Center
  Johnson City, TN
- Game attendance: 13,131

=== Furman ===
#12 Furman at #1 Marshall

Team	1	2	3	4	Total
Paladins	0	17	0	0	17
• Thundering Herd	7	7	14	14	42

- Date: November 16
- Location:
  Marshall Stadium
  Huntington, WV
- Game attendance: 22,615

=== Delaware (Division I-AA First Round Playoff Game) ===
#11 Delaware at #1 Marshall

Team	1	2	3	4	Total
Fightin' Blue Hens	0	14	0	0	14
• Thundering Herd	7	14	24	14	59

- Date: November 30
- Location:
  Marshall Stadium
  Huntington, WV
- Game attendance: 15,429

Randy Moss caught 8 passes (3 TD) for a school record 288 yards.

=== Furman (Division I-AA Quarterfinal Playoff Game) ===
#13 Furman at #1 Marshall

Team	1	2	3	4	Total
Paladins	0	0	0	0	0
• Thundering Herd	14	10	16	14	54

- Date: December 7
- Location:
  Marshall Stadium
  Huntington, WV
- Game attendance: 14,096

=== Northern Iowa (Division I-AA Semifinal Playoff Game) ===
#3 Northern Iowa at #1 Marshall

Team	1	2	3	4	Total
Panthers	0	0	0	14	14
• Thundering Herd	7	3	14	7	31

- Date: December 14
- Location:
  Marshall Stadium
  Huntington, WV
- Game attendance: 14,414

=== Montana (Division I-AA National Championship) ===
#2 Montana at #1 Marshall

Team	1	2	3	4	Total
Grizzlies	0	6	0	23	29
• Thundering Herd	14	9	16	10	49

- Date: December 21
- Location:
  Marshall Stadium
  Huntington, WV
- Game start: 2:00 p.m. EST
- Elapsed time: 3:25
- Game attendance: 30,052
- Game weather: 39 °F (4 °C), Sunny, Wind NE 10–15 mph (16–24 km/h)
- TV announcers (ESPN): Brad Nessler and Gary Danielson

Scoring summary
1	9:13	Marshall	Randy Moss 19-yard pass from Eric Kresser (Openlander kick)	Marshall 7–0
1	2:09	Marshall	Doug Chapman 61-yard run (Openlander kick)	Marshall 14–0
2	14:08	Marshall	Randy Moss 70-yard pass from Eric Kresser (kick blocked)	Marshall 20–0
2	8:14	Marshall	Openlander 20-yard field goal	Marshall 23–0
2	5:05	Montana	Larson 40-yard field goal	Marshall 23–3
2	0:15	Montana	Larson 27-yard field goal	Marshall 23–6
3	14:05	Marshall	Randy Moss 54-yard pass from Eric Kresser (Openlander kick)	Marshall 30–6
3	5:03	Marshall	Doug Chapman 9-yard run (Openlander kick)	Marshall 37–6
3	3:34	Marshall	Safety, intentional grounding by Ah Yat in the end zone	Marshall 39–6
4	14:51	Marshall	Randy Moss 28-yard pass from Eric Kresser (Openlander kick)	Marshall 46–6
4	10:52	Montana	Douglass 4-yard pass from Ah Yat (Neil pass from Ah Yat)	Marshall 46–14
4	7:09	Montana	Branen 2-yard run (Douglass from Ah Yat)	Marshall 46–22
4	4:18	Marshall	Openlander 37-yard field goal	Marshall 49–22
4	2:09	Montana	Paffhausen 18 pass from Ah Yat (Larson kick)	Marshall 49–29

Randy Moss hauled in 9 passes for 220 yards and 4 TD as the Thundering Herd avenged the previous season's loss to Montana in the title game.

== Roster ==
1996 Marshall Thundering Herd football team roster
Players
Coaches
Offense

Pos.	#	Name	Class
RB	39	Jason Balwanz	Fr
RB	22	Doug Chapman	Fr
WR	18	LaVorn Colclough	So
OT	63	Mike Guilliams	Fr
QB	15	Eric Kresser	Sr
WR	1	Tim Martin	Sr
WR	88	Randy Moss	Fr
QB	10	Chad Pennington	So
G	52	Brian Reed (injured)	Sr
G	65	Burt Scarbrough	So
C	62	Jason Starkey	Fr
RB	3	Erik Thomas	Sr
RB	32	Llow Turner	Fr
C	66	John Wade	Jr
OT	60	Jamie Wilson	Sr
TE	87	John White	So
WR	2	Mark Wicks	Jr
QB	7	Mark Zban	Jr
WR	89	Jerrald Long	So
C	59	Aaron Ferguson	Sr

Defense

Pos.	#	Name	Class
DB	42	Rogers Beckett	Fr
DE	5	B. J. Cohen	Jr
DB	12	Andy Cowan	Fr
DB	25	Melvin Cunningham	Sr
LB	4	John Grace	Fr
DL	6	Ricky Hall	So
DT	86	Billy Lyon	Sr
DE	94	Mike Williams	So
CB	9	Thomas Maxwell	Jr
SS	21	Scott Smythe	Sr
LB	28	Larry McCloud	Jr
DE	93	Giradie Mercer	Fr
DB	11	Larry Moore	Jr
LB	55	Andre O'Neal	Fr
CB	8	B. J. Summers	Jr
DE	58	Paul Totten	So
DT	97	Joe Zeglowitsch	So

Special teams

Pos.	#	Name	Class
P	41	Chris Hanson	So
K	40	Tim Openlander	Sr

Head coach

- Bob Pruett

Coordinators/assistant coaches

- Kevin Kelly – Defensive coordinator
- Larry Kueck – co-Offensive coordinator
- Gunter Brewer – co-Offensive coordinator
- Brian Dowler – Wide receivers

Legend

- (C) Team captain
- (S) Suspended
- (I) Ineligible
- Injured
- Redshirt
