= Williamson High School (West Virginia) =

Location
- 801 Alderson Street; Williamson, West Virginia 25661; United States; 37°40′32″N 82°16′29″W

Information
- School type: Public, High School
- Established: 1910
- School district: Mingo County Schools
- Superintendent: Randy Keathley
- Principal: Doug Ward
- Grades: 9, 10, 11, 12
- Age range: 14–19 years of age
- Enrollment: 180 (2010–2011)
- Language: English
- Campus: City
- Colors: Maroon and white
- Sports: Basketball, Football, Baseball, Track and Field, Volleyball, Softball
- Mascot: Wolfie
- Team name: Williamson Wolfpack
- Rivals: Burch High School; Belfry High School; Tug Valley High School; Matewan High School; Logan High School
- Yearbook: Tug River Breeze
- Communities served: Williamson, Chattaroy, Borderland, Nolan, and Rawl
- Feeder schools: Williamson Middle School
- Website: www.williamsonhigh.us

Williamson High School (WHS) was a public high school in Williamson, West Virginia. It closed in June 2011.

== History ==
Williamson High School graduated its first class in 1910. During its existence, the school was housed in three different buildings. Chattaroy High School merged into Williamson in 1963 while Liberty High School merged into WHS in 1966.

On June 7, 2011, Williamson High School was closed and consolidated with Gilbert, Matewan and Burch high schools to form the newly-established Mingo Central High School. MCHS was constructed 25 miles south of Williamson at an elevation of 1,940 feet, on top of a reclaimed surface mining site in Newtown, West Virginia.

The building was auctioned off for $800,500 in 2018.

== Sports ==
WHS won 13 state titles over its 101-year history.

- Boys' basketball: 1964 (AA), 1983 (AA), 1986 (AA), 1988 (AA), 1989 (AA), 2001 (A)
- Football: 1926, 1944, 1960 (AA), 1961 (AA)
- Baseball: 1948, 1965 (AAA)
- Cheerleading: 1995 (A)

== Notable alumni ==
- Verlin Adams former NFL player, West Virginia Sports Hall of Fame
