= Melvin Cunningham =

American football player and coach (born 1973)

No. 45, 17
- Position: Defensive specialist

Personal information
- Born: December 16, 1973 (age 52); Red Jacket, West Virginia, U.S.
- Listed height: 5 ft 10 in (1.78 m)
- Listed weight: 185 lb (84 kg)

Career information
- College: Marshall (1992–1996)
- NFL draft: 1997: undrafted

Career history

Playing
- Miami Dolphins (1997)*; Tampa Bay Storm (1999–2003)
- * Offseason or practice squad member only

Coaching
- River Cities LocoMotives (2001) (DB); Fairland High School (2015–2023) (HC); Murray High School (Kentucky) (2023–present) (HC)

Awards and highlights
- Second-team All-Arena (1999); 2× NCAA I-AA national champion (1992, 1996)

Career AFL statistics
- Tackles: 54
- Pass breakups: 14
- Receptions: 77
- Receiving yards: 957
- Total TDs: 15
- Stats at ArenaFan.com

Melvin Cunningham (born December 16, 1973) is an American former football defensive specialist who played two seasons with the Tampa Bay Storm of the Arena Football League (AFL). He played college football at Marshall University. He was also a member of the Miami Dolphins of the National Football League (NFL).

== College career ==
Cunningham played for the Marshall Thundering Herd from 1993 to 1996. He was an All-American and first team All-Southern Conference selection in 1995 and 1996. He recorded 3 interceptions, returning both for touchdowns, and 27 tackles his senior year in 1996. The Thundering Herd won the Division I-AA national championship in 1996.

== Professional career ==
Cunningham signed with the Miami Dolphins of the NFL on April 27, 1997 after going undrafted in the 1997 NFL draft. He was released by the Dolphins on August 12, 1997.

Cunningham was signed by the AFL's Tampa Bay Storm during the 1999 off-season. He earned second-team All-Arena honors in 1999. He missed the 2000 and 2001 seasons due to injury. He was placed on injured reserve on June 18, 2002. Cunningham was later placed on the injured exempt list on January 11, 2003. He was released by the Storm on November 6, 2003.

== Coaching career ==
Cunningham was defensive backs coach of the River Cities LocoMotives of the National Indoor Football League in 2001.

Cunningham became head coach of the Tug Valley High School Panthers of Mingo County, West Virginia in 2000. He was defensive coach for the Burch High School Bulldogs of Delbarton, West Virginia in 2010. Cunningham became head coach of the Fairland High School Dragons of Proctorville, Ohio. The team went 0–10 in 2015 and 3–7 in 2016. 2021 season finished 10–2 with a loss in Ohio HS playoffs sweet sixteen round. In 2023, Cunningham resigned from his job at Fairland after he was named the Murray High School head football coach.
