= Burch High School =

Former school in West Virginia

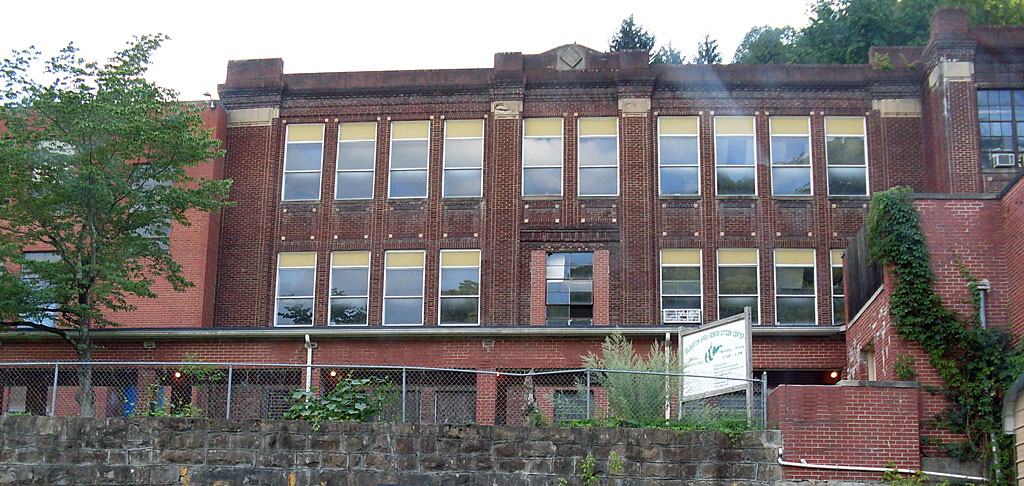
- Old Burch High School

Location
- Burch High School: 1 Bulldog Boulevard; Old Burch High School: Eutaw Avenue; Delbarton, West Virginia 25670; United States; Burch High School: 37°40′38″N 82°10′45″W; Old Burch High School: 37°42′41″N 82°11′08″W

Information
- School type: Public, High School
- Established: 1921; 105 years ago
- Status: Closed
- Closed: June 2011; 15 years ago
- School board: Mingo County Board of Education
- Grades: 7 to 12
- Language: English
- Campus: Town
- Color: Red white blue
- Athletics: Basketball, Football, Baseball, Volleyball
- Mascot: Bulldog
- Team name: Burch Bulldogs
- Rivals: Tug Valley High School; Matewan High School; Williamson High School; Gilbert High School
- Newspaper: Bulldog's Bark
- Yearbook: The Bulldog
- Feeder schools: Burch Middle School
- Website: BHS Alumni Forum Website

Burch High School (BHS) was a public high school in Delbarton, West Virginia. It was closed in June 2011.

== History ==
In 1916, under the leadership of Lee District board members James A. Farley, Bill Maynard, John Pinson, District Supervisor Lacy Chapman, and Superintendent of Schools Sam Curry, the plan for a new high school was started.

In the fall of 1918, Frank Totten and Claude Dove, principals of the Rock House and Upper Elk schools respectively, were brought to Mingo County to organize the new school. These two principals organized a third-class high school in 1919 at Rock House. In the fall of that year, they moved the new Rock House High School to Upper Elk with Claude Dove as principal. After moving, Rock House High School was promoted to a second-class high school.

In the fall of 1921, Rock House High School moved back to Rock House as a first-class high school and the school's name was changed to Burch High School.

The first graduating class, in 1922, comprised twenty-one students. Of this 1922 class, two became attorneys, five went on to become doctors, and twelve became teachers. James Bertram "Bert" Curry (1901–2004), the valedictorian of the class, became a very successful carpenter, and lived to the grand age of 103 years.

Burch High School shared its halls and classrooms with Burch Junior High for many years. In June 1987, Burch High School and Burch Junior High School separated. Burch Junior High remained in the same building while Burch High School moved to a new facility adjacent to the existing Mingo County Vocational School in Airport Bottom, approximately 3 miles south on Route 52. The BHS class of 1987 was the last class to graduate from the old school while the class of 1988 was the first to graduate from the new Burch High School, after starting off the year at the old building.

In June 2011, Burch High School closed its doors for the last time. The 90-year-old school was consolidated with Gilbert, Matewan, and Williamson high schools to form Mingo Central High School, which opened in August 2011. The new school sits at an elevation of 1,940 feet on a 90-acre site along the King Coal Highway in Delbarton, WV (approx. 7 miles southeast of Delbarton).

=== Principals ===
- Claude Dove
- O. C. Van Camp
- R. E. Remish
- H. D. Fleming
- Marion D. West
- W. A. Collawn
- Troy Floyd
- Wayne B. Curry
- Henry C. Justice
- James Blevins
- Bradford Justice
- Jada Hunter
- W.C. Totten
- Jim Fletcher
- Tag Keith
- Don Gillman

== School Anthem ==
The School Anthem of Burch High School was adapted from Sam Houston State University's "Alma Mater". It was most commonly played or sung at Burch High School class assemblies and sporting events.

"Hail to Burch High School, Hats off to you,
Ever you'll find us, Loyal and true;
Firm and undaunted, Ever we'll be.
Here's to the school we love.
Here's a toast to thee!"

== Athletics ==
Burch High School earned five state basketball titles.

=== Basketball ===
BHS won the first-ever basketball state title by a Mingo County high school in 1957 (Burch (27-1) 58, Barrackville (24-4) 54), under coach Bill Young. John Maynard, a future Burch head coach, played on that team under the old Class B division.

Burch then won the Class A title in 1989 (Burch (23-2) 70, Bishop Donahue (20-5) 61), with Coach John Maynard; then two more in 1991 (Burch (23-3) 67, Peterstown (25-1) 53), and in 1993 (Burch (24-3) 70, Doddridge Co. (14-12) 42), under Coach Mike Smith. On March 16, 2011, the Bulldogs played their final basketball game. Burch played its final home basketball game, on February 25, 2011, against Regional Christian School of Delbarton, WV.

==== State Basketball Titles ====
Old Class "B"
1957 (State Title) vs. Barrackville (58-54 FINAL)

Class "A"
1989 (State Title) vs. Bishop Donahue (70-61 FINAL)
1991 (State Title) vs. Peterstown (67-53 FINAL)
1993 (State Title) vs. Doddridge County (70-42 FINAL) 1994 State Runner-Up ( Doddridge County ) 1998 State Runner-Up ( Mullen's )

==== Boys' Basketball Coaches ====
- L. T. Hulenbright (Only lost 1 game in 1922)
- Bill Young (Old Class B State Championship 1957)
- Charles Hale
- John W. Maynard (Class A State Championship 1989.)
- Mike Smith (Second best school record in 1982, 19 of 20 games. Class A State Championship 1991, 1993.)
- Kevin Hatfield

==== Girls' Basketball Coaches ====
- Sally Farley (Lost 1 game in 3 years.)
- Lucille McDonald
- Bill Smith (Won Burch's only girls state title in 1990)State Title 50–48 over Montcalm
