= Williamson High School =

Williamson High School can refer to:

- Williamson High School (Alabama)
- Williamson High School (Pennsylvania)
- Williamson High School (West Virginia)
