= 2006 Lehigh Mountain Hawks football team =

American college football season

2006 Lehigh Mountain Hawks football

Patriot League co-champion
- Conference: Patriot League
- Record: 6–5 (5–1 Patriot)
- Head coach: Andy Coen (1st season)
- Offensive coordinator: Trey Brown (1st season)
- Captains: Julian Austin; John Reese; Sedale Threatt
- Home stadium: Goodman Stadium

2006 Patriot League football standings
	Conf.			Overall
Team	W		L	W		L
Lafayette +^	5	–	1	6	–	6
Lehigh +	5	–	1	6	–	5
Holy Cross	4	–	2	7	–	4
Bucknell	3	–	3	6	–	5
Colgate	3	–	3	4	–	7
Fordham	1	–	5	3	–	8
Georgetown	0	–	6	2	–	9
+ – Conference co-champions; ^ – FCS playoff participant; Rankings from The Sports Network poll

The 2006 Lehigh Mountain Hawks football team was an American football team that represented Lehigh University during the 2006 NCAA Division I FCS football season. Lehigh won the Patriot League co-championship but did not qualify for the national playoffs.

In their first year under head coach Andy Coen, the Mountain Hawks compiled a 6–5 record. Julian Austin, John Reese and Sedale Threatt were the team captains.

The Mountain Hawks outscored opponents 299 to 222. Their 5–1 conference record tied for best in the Patriot League standings. Their season-ending loss to archrival Lafayette resulted in the shared title, and ended Lehigh's postseason hopes, as Lafayette was awarded the Patriot League's only berth in the FCS national playoffs.

Lehigh played its home games at Goodman Stadium on the university's Goodman Campus in Bethlehem, Pennsylvania.

== Schedule ==
Date	Opponent	Site	Result	Attendance	Source
September 2	Albany*	Goodman Stadium; Bethlehem, PA	L 16–17	1,812	
September 9	at Villanova*	Villanova Stadium; Villanova, PA	W 31–28	9,219	
September 16	Princeton*	Goodman Stadium; Bethlehem, PA	L 10–14	8,667	
September 30	No. 22 Harvard*	Goodman Stadium; Bethlehem, PA	L 33–35	10,680	
October 7	at Georgetown	Multi-Sport Field; Washington, DC	W 28–3		
October 14	at Yale*	Yale Bowl; New Haven, CT	L 20–26 ^{OT}	13,236	
October 21	Bucknell	Goodman Stadium; Bethlehem, PA	W 38–7	10,673	
October 28	at Holy Cross	Fitton Field; Worcester, MA	W 28–14	1,428	
November 4	Colgate	Goodman Stadium; Bethlehem, PA	W 23–15	11,874	
November 11	Fordham	Goodman Stadium; Bethlehem, PA	W 45–14	8,692	
November 18	at Lafayette	Fisher Stadium; Easton, PA (The Rivalry)	L 27–49	15,207	
*Non-conference game; Rankings from The Sports Network Poll released prior to the game
