= 2006 Colgate Raiders football team =

American college football season

2006 Colgate Raiders football
- Conference: Patriot League
- Record: 4–7 (3–3 Patriot)
- Head coach: Dick Biddle (11th season)
- Captains: Geoff Bean; Mike Saraceno; Jake Sulovski
- Home stadium: Andy Kerr Stadium

2006 Patriot League football standings
	Conf.			Overall
Team	W		L	W		L
Lafayette +^	5	–	1	6	–	6
Lehigh +	5	–	1	6	–	5
Holy Cross	4	–	2	7	–	4
Bucknell	3	–	3	6	–	5
Colgate	3	–	3	4	–	7
Fordham	1	–	5	3	–	8
Georgetown	0	–	6	2	–	9
+ – Conference co-champions; ^ – FCS playoff participant; Rankings from The Sports Network poll

The 2006 Colgate Raiders football team was an American football team that represented Colgate University during the 2006 NCAA Division I FCS football season. Colgate tied for fourth in the Patriot League.

In its 11th season under head coach Dick Biddle, the team compiled a 4–7 record. Geoff Bean, Mike Saraceno and Jake Sulovski were the team captains.

The Raiders outscored opponents 246 to 243. Their 3–3 conference record tied for fourth in the seven-team Patriot League standings.

The team played its home games at Andy Kerr Stadium in Hamilton, New York.

== Schedule ==
Date	Time	Opponent	Site	Result	Attendance	Source
September 2	1:00 p.m.	at No. 10 UMass*	McGuirk Stadium; Hadley, MA	L 7–28	8,191	
September 16		Dartmouth*	Andy Kerr Stadium; Hamilton, NY	W 28–7	5,828	
September 23	1:00 p.m.	Monmouth*	Andy Kerr Stadium; Hamilton, NY	L 12–17	3,512	
September 30		Georgetown	Andy Kerr Stadium; Hamilton, NY	W 31–14	3,031	
October 7	1:00 p.m.	Princeton*	Andy Kerr Stadium; Hamilton, NY	L 26–27 ^{OT}	4,220	
October 14	1:00 p.m.	at Cornell*	Schoellkopf Field; Ithaca, NY (rivalry)	L 14–38	9,142	
October 21		at Fordham	Coffey Field; Bronx, NY	W 46–3	6,433	
October 28	1:00 p.m.	Lafayette	Andy Kerr Stadium; Hamilton, NY	L 10–27	2,010	
November 4		at Lehigh	Goodman Stadium; Bethlehem, PA	L 15–23	11,874	
November 11		Holy Cross	Andy Kerr Stadium; Hamilton, NY	W 29–28	2,356	
November 18		at Bucknell	Christy Mathewson–Memorial Stadium; Lewisburg, PA	L 28–31		
*Non-conference game; Rankings from The Sports Network Poll released prior to the game; All times are in Eastern time
