= 2006 Bucknell Bison football team =

American college football season

2006 Bucknell Bison football
- Conference: Patriot League
- Record: 6–5 (3–3 Patriot)
- Head coach: Tim Landis (4th season)
- Offensive coordinator: Ashley Ingram (1st season)
- Captains: Stefan Niemczyk; Dorian Petersen
- Home stadium: Christy Mathewson–Memorial Stadium

2006 Patriot League football standings
	Conf.			Overall
Team	W		L	W		L
Lafayette +^	5	–	1	6	–	6
Lehigh +	5	–	1	6	–	5
Holy Cross	4	–	2	7	–	4
Bucknell	3	–	3	6	–	5
Colgate	3	–	3	4	–	7
Fordham	1	–	5	3	–	8
Georgetown	0	–	6	2	–	9
+ – Conference co-champions; ^ – FCS playoff participant; Rankings from The Sports Network poll

The 2006 Bucknell Bison football team was an American football team that represented Bucknell University during the 2006 NCAA Division I FCS football season. It tied for fourth in the Patriot League.

Bucknell played its home games at Christy Mathewson–Memorial Stadium on the university campus in Lewisburg, Pennsylvania.

In its fourth season under head coach Tim Landis, the Bison compiled a 6–5 record. Stefan Niemczyk and Dorian Petersen were the team captains.

The Bison were outscored 268 to 222. Their 3–3 conference record tied with Colgate for fourth place in the seven-team Patriot League standings.

== Schedule ==
Date	Opponent	Site	Result	Attendance	Source
September 2	at Duquesne*	Christy Mathewson–Memorial Stadium; Lewisburg, PA	W 31–28 ^{OT}	1,910	
September 9	No. 25 Lafayette	Christy Mathewson–Memorial Stadium; Lewisburg, PA	L 0–31	6,273	
September 16	Cornell*	Christy Mathewson–Memorial Stadium; Lewisburg, PA	W 20–5	6,152	
September 23	at No. 7 Richmond*	University of Richmond Stadium; Richmond, VA	L 21–48	4,900	
September 30	at Marist*	Leonidoff Field; Poughkeepsie, NY	W 48–19	2,417	
October 7	Penn^{†}*	Christy Mathewson–Memorial Stadium; Lewisburg, PA	L 24–34	6,250	
October 14	at Georgetown	Multi-Purpose Field; Washington, DC	W 17–7		
October 21	at Lehigh	Goodman Stadium; Bethlehem, PA	L 7–38	10,673	
October 28	Fordham^	Christy Mathewson–Memorial Stadium; Lewisburg, PA	W 13–3	4,792	
November 4	at Holy Cross	Fitton Field; Worcester, MA	L 10–27	5,126	
November 18	Colgate	Christy Mathewson–Memorial Stadium; Lewisburg, PA	W 31–28		
*Non-conference game; ^{†}Homecoming; ^ Parents Weekend; Rankings from The Sports Network Poll released prior to the game
