= Don Powers =

American football player and coach (1944–2017)

Biographical details
- Born: November 14, 1944; Lincolnton, North Carolina, U.S.
- Died: December 4, 2017 (aged 73); Mount Pleasant, South Carolina, U.S.

Playing career
- 1963–1967: Western Carolina

Coaching career (HC unless noted)
- 1968–1983: Western Carolina (LB, DC)
- 1984: Western Kentucky (DC)
- 1985–1987: East Carolina (DC)
- 1988: East Carolina (AHC)
- 1989–1995: The Citadel (DC)
- 1996–2000: The Citadel
- 2006–2007: Western Carolina (DC)

Head coaching record
- Overall: 19–36

Donald Wayne Powers (November 14, 1944 – December 4, 2017) was an American football coach. He was the 20th head football coach at The Citadel, serving for five seasons, from 1996 to 2000, and compiling a record of 19–36. He also served as an assistant coach, working principally with linebackers and defensive backs, and as a defensive coordinator, at Western Carolina (in two stints), Western Kentucky, and East Carolina.

== Head coaching record ==
| Year | Team | Overall | Conference | Standing | Bowl/playoffs |
|---|---|---|---|---|---|
The Citadel Bulldogs (Southern Conference) (1955–1956)
| 1996 | The Citadel | 4–7 | 3–5 | 5th | |
| 1997 | The Citadel | 6–5 | 4–4 | 4th | |
| 1998 | The Citadel | 5–6 | 4–4 | 4th | |
| 1999 | The Citadel | 2–9 | 1–7 | 8th | |
| 2000 | The Citadel | 2–9 | 1–7 | T-8th | |
| The Citadel: | | 19–36 | 13–27 | | |
| Total: | | 19–36 | | | |
