= Jim Knowles (American football) =

American football player and coach (born 1965)

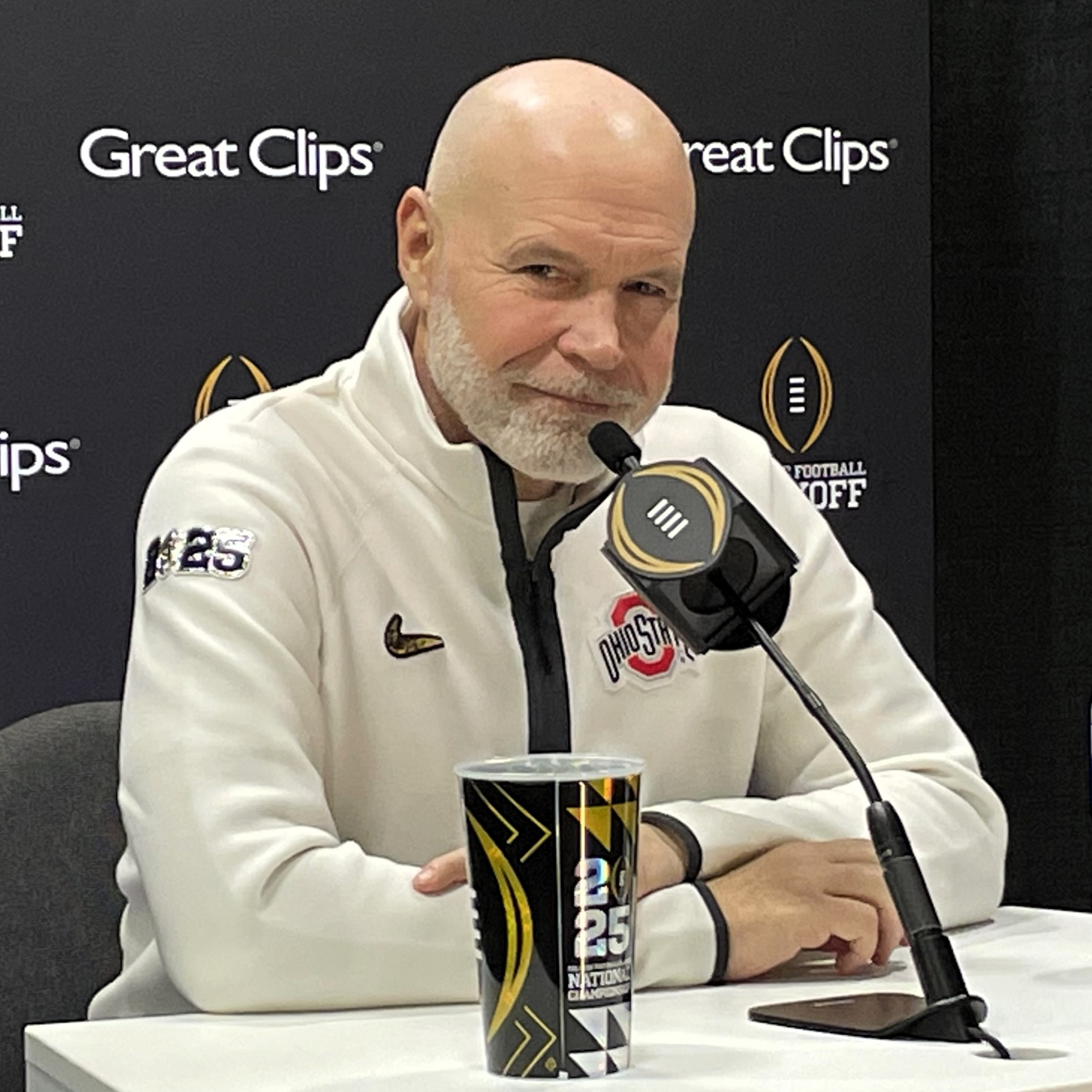
- Knowles in 2025

Current position
- Title: Defensive coordinator
- Team: Tennessee
- Conference: SEC

Biographical details
- Born: April 16, 1965 (age 61); Philadelphia, Pennsylvania, U.S.

Playing career
- 1983–1986: Cornell
- Position: Defensive end

Coaching career (HC unless noted)
- 1988: Cornell (DL)
- 1989–1994: Cornell (RB)
- 1995–1996: Cornell (LB/RC)
- 1997–2000: Western Michigan (DL)
- 2001–2002: Western Michigan (DC)
- 2003: Ole Miss (LB/RC)
- 2004–2009: Cornell
- 2010–2011: Duke (DC/S)
- 2012–2014: Duke (DC)
- 2015–2017: Duke (DC/ILB)
- 2018–2021: Oklahoma State (DC)
- 2022–2024: Ohio State (DC)
- 2025: Penn State (DC)
- 2026–present: Tennessee (DC)

Head coaching record
- Overall: 26–34

Accomplishments and honors

Championships
- As an assistant coach: CFP national champion (2024)

Jim Knowles (born April 16, 1965) is an American college football coach and former player. He is currently the defensive coordinator at University of Tennessee. Knowles served as the head football coach at Cornell University from 2004 to 2009.

== Career ==
A 1987 graduate of Cornell University, Knowles was a defensive end on the Big Red football team. He was elected to Cornell's Sphinx Head Society during his senior year, ultimately graduating with a B.S. in Industrial and Labor Relations in 1987. Prior to receiving the head coach position, Knowles served as an assistant at Cornell, Western Michigan University and the University of Mississippi.

=== Cornell ===
From 2004 to 2009, he compiled a 26–34 record as head football coach at Cornell University.

=== Duke ===
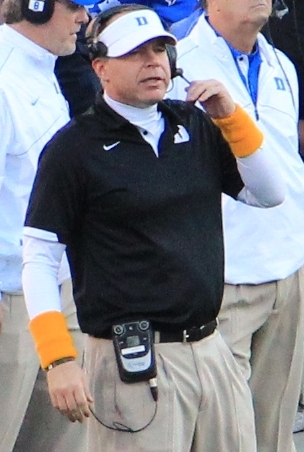
Knowles at Duke in 2012

On December 28, 2009, Knowles was named the defensive coordinator at Duke under head coach David Cutcliffe. Knowles had previously served as linebackers coach under Cutcliffe while he was head coach at the University of Mississippi (Ole Miss) in 2003.

=== Oklahoma State ===
On January 29, 2018, Knowles was hired as the defensive coordinator at Oklahoma State under head coach Mike Gundy, and held the position through the 2021 season. During Knowles' time at Oklahoma State, the Cowboys' defense saw significant statistical improvements. After regressing in areas like opponent points per play and opponent yards per play during Knowles' first season, Oklahoma State's defense improved in each of Knowles' next three seasons. For the 2021 season, Knowles' defense finished top ten in areas such as opponent points per play, opponent points per game, opponent yards per play, opponent yards per game, opponent yards per rush attempt, opponent rushing yards per game, team sack percentage, and sacks per game.

=== Ohio State ===
Ohio State Buckeyes head coach Ryan Day announced on December 7, 2021 that Knowles had accepted the defensive coordinator position for his team, effective January 2, 2022. For the 2024 season, Knowles' defense ranked 1st in yards allowed, 1st in scoring defense, and 1st in red zone defense in college football. Knowles helped Ohio State win the National Championship that same season, the first in the new 12-team College Football Playoff format.

=== Penn State ===
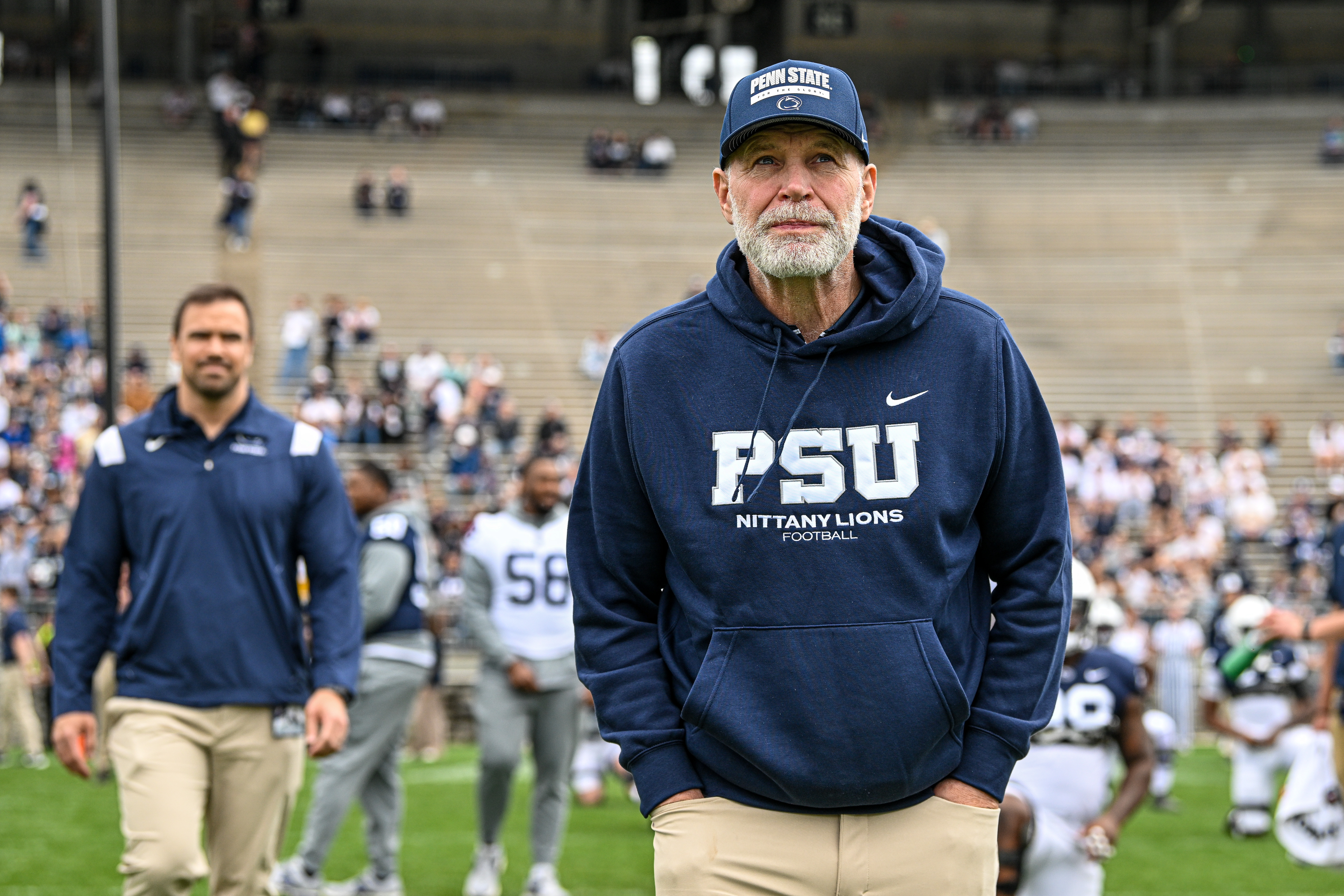
Knowles at the 2025 Blue-White Game at Beaver Stadium.

On February 4, 2025, Knowles was officially introduced as the new defensive coordinator at Penn State, replacing previous defensive coordinator Tom Allen. In joining Penn State, Knowles became the highest-paid assistant coach in college football at the time. Following the firing of James Franklin, Knowles and Penn State parted ways at the conclusion of the regular season. Penn State agreed to pay part of his $9 million buyout.

=== Tennessee ===
On December 11, 2025, Knowles was hired by Tennessee, replacing Tim Banks. He was issued a 3-year deal worth $6.6 million, plus bonuses.

== Head coaching record ==
Year	Team	Overall	Conference	Standing	Bowl/playoffs
Cornell Big Red (Ivy League) (2004–2009)
2004	Cornell	4–6	4–3	3rd	
2005	Cornell	6–4	4–3	T–4th	
2006	Cornell	5–5	3–4	T–4th	
2007	Cornell	5–5	2–5	7th	
2008	Cornell	4–6	2–5	T–6th	
2009	Cornell	2–8	1–6	8th	
Cornell:		26–34	16–26		
Total:		26–34			
