= 1996 The Citadel Bulldogs football team =

American college football season

1996 The Citadel Bulldogs football
- Conference: Southern Conference
- Record: 4–7 (3–5 SoCon)
- Head coach: Don Powers (1st season)
- Offensive coordinator: Mark Tucker (1st season)
- Offensive scheme: Option
- Home stadium: Johnson Hagood Stadium

1996 Southern Conference football standings
	Conf.			Overall
Team	W		L	W		L
No. 1 Marshall $^	8	–	0	15	–	0
No. T–8 East Tennessee State ^	7	–	1	10	–	3
No. 13 Furman ^	6	–	2	9	–	4
No. 25 Appalachian State	5	–	3	7	–	4
The Citadel	3	–	5	4	–	7
Georgia Southern	2	–	6	4	–	7
VMI	2	–	6	3	–	8
Chattanooga	2	–	6	3	–	8
Western Carolina	1	–	7	4	–	7
$ – Conference champion; Rankings from The Sports Network poll

The 1996 The Citadel Bulldogs football team represented The Citadel, The Military College of South Carolina in the 1996 NCAA Division I-AA football season. Don Powers served as head coach for the first season. The Bulldogs played as members of the Southern Conference and played home games at Johnson Hagood Stadium.

== Schedule ==
Date	Opponent	Site	Result	Attendance	Source
September 7	at No. 11 Miami (FL)*	Miami Orange Bowl; Miami, FL	L 6–52	35,747	
September 14	Richmond*	Johnson Hagood Stadium; Charleston, SC	W 13–10	13,069	
September 21	Western Carolina	Johnson Hagood Stadium; Charleston, SC	W 28–14	10,362	
September 28	at No. 4 Appalachian State	Kidd Brewer Stadium; Boone, NC	L 20–34	13,231	
October 12	No. 16 East Tennessee State	Johnson Hagood Stadium; Charleston, SC	L 20–41	16,212	
October 19	at No. 11 Furman	Paladin Stadium; Greenville, SC (rivalry)	L 25–35	11,975	
October 26	Georgia Southern	Johnson Hagood Stadium; Charleston, SC	W 35–20	9,427	
November 2	at No. 1 Marshall	Marshall University Stadium; Huntington, WV	L 25–56	22,038	
November 9	Chattanooga^{†}	Johnson Hagood Stadium; Charleston, SC	W 16–13	17,914	
November 16	at VMI	Alumni Memorial Field; Lexington, VA (Military Classic of the South)	L 27–34 ^{2OT}	7,478	
November 23	Wofford*	Johnson Hagood Stadium; Charleston, SC (rivalry)	L 21–26	9,876	
*Non-conference game; ^{†}Homecoming; Rankings from The Sports Network Poll released prior to the game
