= 1996 Georgia Southern Eagles football team =

American college football season

1996 Georgia Southern Eagles football
- Conference: Southern Conference
- Record: 4–7 (2–6 SoCon)
- Head coach: Frank Ellwood (1st season)
- Offensive coordinator: Daryl Dickey (2nd season)
- Defensive coordinator: Tommy Spangler (7th season)
- Home stadium: Paulson Stadium

1996 Southern Conference football standings
	Conf.			Overall
Team	W		L	W		L
No. 1 Marshall $^	8	–	0	15	–	0
No. T–8 East Tennessee State ^	7	–	1	10	–	3
No. 13 Furman ^	6	–	2	9	–	4
No. 25 Appalachian State	5	–	3	7	–	4
The Citadel	3	–	5	4	–	7
Georgia Southern	2	–	6	4	–	7
VMI	2	–	6	3	–	8
Chattanooga	2	–	6	3	–	8
Western Carolina	1	–	7	4	–	7
$ – Conference champion; Rankings from The Sports Network poll

The 1996 Georgia Southern Eagles football team represented Georgia Southern University as a member of the Southern Conference (SoCon) during the 1996 NCAA Division I-AA football season. Led by Frank Ellwood in his first and only season as head coach, the Eagles compiled an overall record of 4–7 with a conference mark of 2–6, tying for sixth place in the SoCon. Georgia Southern played their home games at Paulson Stadium in Statesboro, Georgia.

== Schedule ==
Date	Opponent	Rank	Site	TV	Result	Attendance	Source
August 31	at South Carolina State*	No. 18	Oliver C. Dawson Stadium; Orangeburg, SC		W 21–14	9,526	
September 7	at No. 4 (I-A) Florida*	No. 14	Ben Hill Griffin Stadium; Gainesville, FL	SS	L 14–62	84,962	
September 21	No. 1 Marshall	No. 13	Paulson Stadium; Statesboro, GA	WSAZ	L 13–29	13,977	
September 28	at Chattanooga	No. 23	Chamberlain Field; Chattanooga, TN		L 21–23	6,324	
October 5	VMI	No. 25	Paulson Stadium; Statesboro, GA		W 20–17	12,041	
October 12	at Western Carolina		E. J. Whitmire Stadium; Cullowhee, NC		W 38–28	7,678	
October 19	Appalachian State		Paulson Stadium; Statesboro, GA (rivalry)		L 28–35	11,074	
October 26	at The Citadel		Johnson Hagood Stadium; Charleston, SC		L 20–35	9,427	
November 2	No. 9 East Tennessee State		Paulson Stadium; Statesboro, GA		L 14–17	12,611	
November 9	at Furman		Paladin Stadium; Greenville, SC		L 14–21	11,616	
November 16	Liberty*		Paulson Stadium; Statesboro, GA		W 45–14	10,959	
*Non-conference game; Rankings from The Sports Network Poll released prior to the game
