= 2006 Fordham Rams football team =

American college football season

2006 Fordham Rams football
- Conference: Patriot League
- Record: 3–8 (1–5 Patriot)
- Head coach: Tom Masella (1st season)
- Defensive coordinator: Frank Forcucci (1st season)
- Captains: Micah Clukey; Carl Garritan; James Prydatko; Marcus Taylor
- Home stadium: Coffey Field

2006 Patriot League football standings
	Conf.			Overall
Team	W		L	W		L
Lafayette +^	5	–	1	6	–	6
Lehigh +	5	–	1	6	–	5
Holy Cross	4	–	2	7	–	4
Bucknell	3	–	3	6	–	5
Colgate	3	–	3	4	–	7
Fordham	1	–	5	3	–	8
Georgetown	0	–	6	2	–	9
+ – Conference co-champions; ^ – FCS playoff participant; Rankings from The Sports Network poll

The 2006 Fordham Rams football team was an American football team that represented Fordham University during the 2006 NCAA Division I FCS football season. Fordham finished second-to-last in the Patriot League.

In their first year under head coach Tom Masella, the Rams compiled a 3–8 record. Micah Clukey, Carl Garritano, James Prydatko and Marcus Taylor were the team captains.

The Rams were outscored 289 to 158. Their 1–5 conference record placed sixth out of seven in the Patriot League standings.

Fordham played its home games at Jack Coffey Field on the university's Rose Hill campus in The Bronx, in New York City.

== Schedule ==
Date	Opponent	Site	Result	Attendance	Source
September 2	Monmouth*	Coffey Field; Bronx, NY	L 9–23	1,721	
September 9	at Albany*	University Field; Albany, NY	W 9–7	5,207	
September 16	at Columbia*	Wien Stadium; New York, NY (Liberty Cup)	L 7–37	4,454	
September 30	at Holy Cross	Fitton Field; Worcester, MA (rivalry)	L 21–28	9,547	
October 7	Duquesne*	Coffey Field; Bronx, NY	L 17–20	2,368	
October 14	Marist^{†}*	Coffey Field; Bronx, NY	W 13–9	6,127	
October 21	Colgate	Coffey Field; Bronx, NY	L 3–46	6,433	
October 28	at Bucknell	Christy Mathewson–Memorial Stadium; Lewisburg, PA	L 3–13	4,792	
November 4	Lafayette	Coffey Field; Bronx, NY	L 24–31	3,231	
November 11	at Lehigh	Goodman Stadium; Bethlehem, PA	L 14–45	8,692	
November 18	Georgetown	Coffey Field; Bronx, NY	W 38–30		
*Non-conference game; ^{†}Homecoming
