= 1996 Chattanooga Moccasins football team =

American college football season

1996 Chattanooga Moccasins football
- Conference: Southern Conference
- Record: 3–8 (2–6 SoCon)
- Head coach: Buddy Green (3rd season)
- Offensive coordinator: Frankie DeBusk (1st season)
- Defensive coordinator: Rick Whitt (3rd season)
- Captains: Jeff Peters; Ron Faugue; Stefan Alston; Tyrone Coleman
- Home stadium: Chamberlain Field

1996 Southern Conference football standings
	Conf.			Overall
Team	W		L	W		L
No. 1 Marshall $^	8	–	0	15	–	0
No. T–8 East Tennessee State ^	7	–	1	10	–	3
No. 13 Furman ^	6	–	2	9	–	4
No. 25 Appalachian State	5	–	3	7	–	4
The Citadel	3	–	5	4	–	7
Georgia Southern	2	–	6	4	–	7
VMI	2	–	6	3	–	8
Chattanooga	2	–	6	3	–	8
Western Carolina	1	–	7	4	–	7
$ – Conference champion; Rankings from The Sports Network poll

The 1996 Chattanooga Moccasins football team represented the University of Tennessee at Chattanooga as a member of the Southern Conference (SoCon) in the 1996 NCAA Division I-AA football season. The Moccasins were led by third-year head coach Buddy Green and played their home games at Chamberlain Field. They finished the season 3–8 overall and 2–6 in SoCon play to tie for sixth place.

== Schedule ==
Date	Opponent	Site	Result	Attendance	Source
August 31	at Colorado State*	Hughes Stadium; Fort Collins, CO	L 19–61	27,171	
September 14	at Middle Tennessee*	Johnny "Red" Floyd Stadium; Murfreesboro, TN	L 9–16	13,571	
September 21	Mississippi Valley State*	Chamberlain Field; Chattanooga, TN	W 26–7	2,917	
September 28	No. 23 Georgia Southern	Chamberlain Field; Chattanooga, TN	W 23–21	6,324	
October 6	at No. 1 Marshall	Marshall University Stadium; Huntington, WV	L 0–45	22,078	
October 19	VMI	Chamberlain Field; Chattanooga, TN	L 14–28	6,490	
October 26	at Western Carolina	Whitmire Stadium; Cullowhee, NC	W 20–6	10,826	
November 2	Appalachian State^{†}	Chamberlain Field; Chattanooga, TN	L 6–20	6,487	
November 9	at The Citadel	Johnson Hagood Stadium; Charleston, SC	L 13–16	17,914	
November 16	East Tennessee State	Chamberlain Field; Chattanooga, TN	L 24–28	6,190	
November 23	at No. 15 Furman	Paladin Stadium; Greenville, SC	L 21–42	8,152	
*Non-conference game; ^{†}Homecoming; Rankings from The Sports Network Poll released prior to the game
