= 2006 Holy Cross Crusaders football team =

American college football season

2006 Holy Cross Crusaders football
- Conference: Patriot League
- Record: 7–4 (4–2 Patriot)
- Head coach: Tom Gilmore (3rd season)
- Offensive coordinator: Chris Pincince (3rd season)
- Defensive coordinator: Richard Rodgers Sr. (1st season)
- Captains: Dan Adams; Casey Gough; Frank Herlihy; Chris Nielsen
- Home stadium: Fitton Field

2006 Patriot League football standings
	Conf.			Overall
Team	W		L	W		L
Lafayette +^	5	–	1	6	–	6
Lehigh +	5	–	1	6	–	5
Holy Cross	4	–	2	7	–	4
Bucknell	3	–	3	6	–	5
Colgate	3	–	3	4	–	7
Fordham	1	–	5	3	–	8
Georgetown	0	–	6	2	–	9
+ – Conference co-champions; ^ – FCS playoff participant; Rankings from The Sports Network poll

The 2006 Holy Cross Crusaders football team was an American football team that represented the College of the Holy Cross during the 2006 NCAA Division I FCS football season. Holy Cross finished third in the Patriot League.

In their third year under head coach Tom Gilmore, the Crusaders compiled a 7–4 record. Dan Adams, Casey Gough, Frank Herlihy and Chris Nielsen were the team captains.

The Crusaders outscored opponents 275 to 235. Their 4–2 conference record placed third in the seven-team Patriot League standings.

Holy Cross played its home games at Fitton Field on the college campus in Worcester, Massachusetts.

== Schedule ==
Date	Opponent	Site	Result	Attendance	Source
September 2	at Georgetown	Multi-Sport Field; Washington, DC	W 26–13	1,845	
September 9	Northeastern*	Fitton Field; Worcester, MA	L 14–24	8,112	
September 16	at Harvard*	Harvard Stadium; Boston, MA	L 14–31	11,209	
September 23	at Marist*	Leonidoff Field; Poughkeepsie, NY	W 27–0	2,026	
September 30	Fordham^{†}	Fitton Field; Worcester, MA (rivalry)	W 28–21	9,547	
October 7	Brown*	Fitton Field; Worcester, MA	W 35–30	4,497	
October 14	at Dartmouth*	Memorial Field; Hanover, NH	W 24–21 ^{OT}	7,414	
October 21	at Lafayette	Fisher Stadium; Easton, PA	W 38–28	7,893	
October 28	No. 17 Lehigh^	Fitton Field; Worcester, MA	L 14–28	1,428	
November 4	Bucknell	Fitton Field; Worcester, MA	W 27–10	5,126	
November 11	at Colgate	Andy Kerr Stadium; Hamilton, NY	L 28–29	2,356	
*Non-conference game; ^{†}Homecoming; ^ Family Weekend; Rankings from The Sports Network Poll released prior to the game
