= 2006 Penn Quakers football team =

American college football season

2006 Penn Quakers football
- Conference: Ivy League
- Record: 5–5 (3–4 Ivy)
- Head coach: Al Bagnoli (15th season)
- Offensive coordinator: Shawn Halloran (1st season)
- Defensive coordinator: Ray Priore (9th season)
- Home stadium: Franklin Field

2006 Ivy League football standings
	Conf.			Overall
Team	W		L	W		L
No. 18 Princeton +	6	–	1	9	–	1
No. 25 Yale +	6	–	1	8	–	2
Harvard	4	–	3	7	–	3
Penn	3	–	4	5	–	5
Cornell	3	–	4	5	–	5
Dartmouth	2	–	5	2	–	8
Columbia	2	–	5	5	–	5
Brown	2	–	5	3	–	7
+ – Conference co-champions; Rankings from The Sports Network poll

The 2006 Penn Quakers football team represented the University of Pennsylvania in the 2006 NCAA Division I FCS football season. It was the 130th season of play for the Quakers. They were led by 15th-year head coach Al Bagnoli and played their home games at Franklin Field in Philadelphia. The Quakers tied for fourth in the Ivy League. They finished the season 5–5 overall and 3–4 in Ivy League play.

== Schedule ==
Date	Time	Opponent	Site	TV	Result	Attendance	Source
September 16	1:00 p.m.	at No. 22 Lafayette*	Fisher Stadium; Easton, PA	RCN4/WBPH-60	W 21–11	9,251	
September 23	7:00 p.m.	Villanova*	Franklin Field; Philadelphia, PA	CN8	L 20–27	22,499	
September 30	1:00 p.m.	Dartmouth	Franklin Field; Philadelphia, PA		W 17–10	9,420	
October 7	1:00 p.m.	at Bucknell*	Mathewson Stadium; Lewisburg, PA		W 34–24	6,250	
October 14	1:00 p.m.	Columbia	Franklin Field; Philadelphia, PA		W 16–0	9,189	
October 21	12:30 p.m.	at Yale	Yale Bowl; New Haven, CT	CN8	L 14–17 ^{OT}	21,709	
October 28	Noon	Brown^{†}	Franklin Field; Philadelphia, PA	CSTV	L 27–30 ^{OT}	11,177	
November 4	1:00 p.m.	at No. 23 Princeton	Princeton Stadium; Princeton, NJ (rivalry)	CN8	L 17–22 ^{2OT}	14,385	
November 11	1:00 p.m.	No. 17 Harvard	Franklin Field; Philadelphia, PA (rivalry)	CN8	W 22–13	7,819	
November 18	1:00 p.m.	at Cornell	Schoellkopf Field; Ithaca, NY (rivalry)		L 27–28	2,809	
*Non-conference game; ^{†}Homecoming; Rankings from The Sports Network Poll released prior to the game; All times are in Eastern time
