= River Cities LocoMotives =

Logo

General information
- Founded: 2001
- Folded: 2001
- Headquartered: Huntington, West Virginia at the Big Sandy Superstore Arena
- Colors: Crimson, Silver, Black

Personnel
- Head coach: Melvin Cunningham

Team history
- River Cities LocoMotives (2001)

Home fields
- Big Sandy Superstore Arena (2001)

League / conference affiliations
- National Indoor Football League (2001)

The River Cities LocoMotives were a professional indoor football team based in Huntington, West Virginia in 2001. The team competed in the inaugural season of the National Indoor Football League (NIFL). The "Locos" played their home games at the Big Sandy Superstore Arena. Official team colors were: Crimson, silver, black and gray.

The LocoMotives, coached by Melvin Cunningham, finished the 2001 season with a record of 1–13, and declining fan support caused the team to cease operations after their first season.

Professional indoor football would return to Huntington five years later when the Huntington Heroes began play in 2006.
