= 2006 Columbia Lions football team =

American college football season

2006 Columbia Lions football
- Conference: Ivy League
- Record: 5–5 (2–5 Ivy League)
- Head coach: Norries Wilson (1st season)
- Offensive coordinator: Vinny Marino (1st season)
- Captains: Matt Barsamian; Adam Brekke; Uche Osadebe
- Home stadium: Wien Stadium

2006 Ivy League football standings
	Conf.			Overall
Team	W		L	W		L
No. 18 Princeton +	6	–	1	9	–	1
No. 25 Yale +	6	–	1	8	–	2
Harvard	4	–	3	7	–	3
Penn	3	–	4	5	–	5
Cornell	3	–	4	5	–	5
Dartmouth	2	–	5	2	–	8
Columbia	2	–	5	5	–	5
Brown	2	–	5	3	–	7
+ – Conference co-champions; Rankings from The Sports Network poll

The 2006 Columbia Lions football team was an American football team that represented Columbia University during the 2006 NCAA Division I FCS football season. Columbia tied for last in the Ivy League.

In their first season under head coach Norries Wilson, the Lions compiled a 5–5 record and were outscored 163 to 150. Matt Barsamian, Adam Brekke and Uche Osadebe were the team captains.

The Lions' 2–5 conference record placed them in a three-way tie for sixth in the Ivy League standings. Columbia was outscored 135 to 66 by Ivy opponents.

Columbia played its homes games at Lawrence A. Wien Stadium in Upper Manhattan, in New York City.

== Schedule ==
Date	Opponent	Site	Result	Attendance	Source
September 16	Fordham*	Wien Stadium; New York, NY (Liberty Cup)	W 37–7	4,454	
September 23	Georgetown*	Wien Stadium; New York, NY	W 23–21		
September 30	Princeton	Wien Stadium; New York, NY	L 6–19	8,845	
October 7	Iona*	Wien Stadium; New York, NY	W 24–0	4,012	
October 14	at Penn	Franklin Field; Philadelphia, PA	L 0–16	9,189	
October 21	Dartmouth^{†}	Wien Stadium; New York, NY	L 7–20	3,647	
October 28	at Yale	Yale Bowl; New Haven, CT	L 3–21		
November 4	at No. 18 Harvard	Harvard Stadium; Boston, MA	L 7–24	11,716	
November 11	Cornell	Wien Stadium; New York, NY (rivalry)	W 21–14	4,454	
November 18	at Brown	Brown Stadium; Providence, RI	W 22–21	4,611	
*Non-conference game; ^{†}Homecoming; Rankings from The Sports Network Poll released prior to the game
