= 1996 VMI Keydets football team =

American college football season

1996 VMI Keydets football
- Conference: Southern Conference
- Record: 3–8 (2–6 SoCon)
- Head coach: Bill Stewart (3rd season)
- Home stadium: Alumni Memorial Field

1996 Southern Conference football standings
	Conf.			Overall
Team	W		L	W		L
No. 1 Marshall $^	8	–	0	15	–	0
No. T–8 East Tennessee State ^	7	–	1	10	–	3
No. 13 Furman ^	6	–	2	9	–	4
No. 25 Appalachian State	5	–	3	7	–	4
The Citadel	3	–	5	4	–	7
Georgia Southern	2	–	6	4	–	7
VMI	2	–	6	3	–	8
Chattanooga	2	–	6	3	–	8
Western Carolina	1	–	7	4	–	7
$ – Conference champion; Rankings from The Sports Network poll

The 1996 VMI Keydets football team was an American football team that represented the Virginia Military Institute (VMI) as a member of the Southern Conference (SoCon) during the 1996 NCAA Division I-AA football season. In their third year under head coach Bill Stewart, the team compiled an overall record of 3–8, with a mark of 2–6 in conference play, placing tied for seventh in the SoCon. Stewart resigned in December, and compiled an all-time record of 8–25 during his tenure of head coach of the Keydets from 1994 through 1996.

== Schedule ==
Date	Opponent	Site	Result	Attendance	Source
September 7	at Ole Miss*	Mississippi Veterans Memorial Stadium; Jackson, MS	L 7–31	28,196	
September 14	at No. 23 William & Mary*	Zable Stadium; Williamsburg, VA (rivalry)	L 21–40	9,614	
September 21	at East Tennessee State	Memorial Center; Johnson City, TN	L 0–38	4,711	
September 28	Furman	Alumni Memorial Field; Lexington, VA	L 14–31	6,218	
October 5	at No. 25 Georgia Southern	Paulson Stadium; Statesboro, GA	L 17–20	12,041	
October 12	No. 1 Marshall	Alumni Memorial Field; Lexington, VA	L 20–45	9,165	
October 19	at Chattanooga	Chamberlain Field; Chattanooga, TN	W 28–14	6,490	
November 2	Western Carolina	Alumni Memorial Field; Lexington, VA	L 14–28	4,781	
November 9	Richmond*	Alumni Memorial Field; Lexington, VA (rivalry)	W 20–7	4,911	
November 16	The Citadel	Alumni Memorial Field; Lexington, VA (rivalry)	W 34–27 ^{2OT}	7,478	
November 23	at No. 25 Appalachian State	Kidd Brewer Stadium; Boone, NC	L 14–26	8,260	
*Non-conference game; Rankings from The Sports Network Poll released prior to the game
