= 1996 Furman Paladins football team =

American college football season

1996 Furman Paladins football

NCAA Division I-AA Quarterfinal, L 0–54 vs. Marshall
- Conference: Southern Conference
- Record: 9–4 (6–2 SoCon)
- Head coach: Bobby Johnson (3rd season)
- Captains: Braniff Bonaventure; Luther Broughton; Troy Strappy; Greg Sander
- Home stadium: Paladin Stadium

1996 Southern Conference football standings
	Conf.			Overall
Team	W		L	W		L
No. 1 Marshall $^	8	–	0	15	–	0
No. T–8 East Tennessee State ^	7	–	1	10	–	3
No. 13 Furman ^	6	–	2	9	–	4
No. 25 Appalachian State	5	–	3	7	–	4
The Citadel	3	–	5	4	–	7
Georgia Southern	2	–	6	4	–	7
VMI	2	–	6	3	–	8
Chattanooga	2	–	6	3	–	8
Western Carolina	1	–	7	4	–	7
$ – Conference champion; Rankings from The Sports Network poll

The 1996 Furman Paladins football team was an American football team that represented Furman University as a member of the Southern Conference (SoCon) during the 1996 NCAA Division I-AA football season. In their third year under head coach Bobby Johnson, the Paladins compiled an overall record of 9–4, with a mark of 6–2 in conference play, finishing third in the SoCon. In the playoffs, Furman defeated Northern Arizona in the first round and were defeated by Marshall in the quarterfinals.

== Schedule ==
Date	Opponent	Rank	Site	Result	Attendance	Source
September 7	at Clemson*	No. 19	Memorial Stadium; Clemson, SC	L 3–19	62,243	
September 14	South Carolina State*	No. 21	Paladin Stadium; Greenville, SC	W 27–13	12,225	
September 21	Wofford*	No. 20	Paladin Stadium; Greenville, SC (rivalry)	W 33–3	11,002	
September 28	at VMI	No. 18	Alumni Memorial Field; Lexington, VA	W 21–14	6,218	
October 5	Western Carolina	No. 14	Paladin Stadium; Greenville, SC	W 45–30	11,215	
October 12	at No. 14 Appalachian State	No. 13	Kidd Brewer Stadium; Boone, NC	W 20–14	12,111	
October 19	The Citadel	No. 11	Paladin Stadium; Greenville, SC (rivalry)	W 35–25	11,975	
October 26	at No. 14 East Tennessee State	No. 8	Memorial Center; Johnson City, TN	L 19–21	6,904	
November 9	Georgia Southern	No. 15	Paladin Stadium; Greenville, SC	W 21–14	11,616	
November 16	at No. 1 Marshall	No. 12	Marshall University Stadium; Huntington, WV	L 17–42	22,615	
November 23	Chattanooga	No. 15	Paladin Stadium; Greenville, SC	W 42–21	8,152	
November 30	at No. 6 Northern Arizona*	No. 12	Walkup Skydome; Flagstaff, AZ (NCAA Division I-AA First Round)	W 42–31	8,700	
December 7	at No. 1 Marshall	No. 13	Marshall University Stadium; Huntington, WV (NCAA Division I-AA Quarterfinal)	L 0–54	14,096	
*Non-conference game; Rankings from The Sports Network Poll released prior to the game
