= 2006 Brown Bears football team =

American college football season

2006 Brown Bears football
- Conference: Ivy League
- Record: 3–7 (2–5 Ivy)
- Head coach: Phil Estes (9th season)
- Offensive coordinator: Frank Sheehan (1st season)
- Offensive scheme: Pro-style
- Defensive coordinator: Michael Kelleher (6th season)
- Base defense: 4–3
- Captains: Zak DeOssie; Joe DiGiacomo; Brandon Markey
- Home stadium: Brown Stadium

2006 Ivy League football standings
	Conf.			Overall
Team	W		L	W		L
No. 18 Princeton +	6	–	1	9	–	1
No. 25 Yale +	6	–	1	8	–	2
Harvard	4	–	3	7	–	3
Penn	3	–	4	5	–	5
Cornell	3	–	4	5	–	5
Dartmouth	2	–	5	2	–	8
Columbia	2	–	5	5	–	5
Brown	2	–	5	3	–	7
+ – Conference co-champions; Rankings from The Sports Network poll

The 2006 Brown Bears football team was an American football team that represented Brown University during the 2006 NCAA Division I FCS football season. A year after winning the conference championship, Brown tied for last in the Ivy League.

In their ninth season under head coach Phil Estes, the Bears compiled a 3–7 record and were outscored 225 to 241. Zak DeOssie, Joe DiGiacomo and Brandon Markey were the team captains.

The Bears' 2–5 conference record placed them in a three-way tie for sixth in the Ivy League standings. Brown was outscored 157 to 140 by Ivy opponents.

Brown played its home games at Brown Stadium in Providence, Rhode Island.

== Schedule ==
Date	Opponent	Site	Result	Attendance	Source
September 16	Georgetown*	Brown Stadium; Providence, RI	W 34–21	4,656	
September 23	Harvard	Brown Stadium; Providence, RI	L 21–38	8,456	
September 30	at Rhode Island*	Meade Stadium; Kingston, RI (rivalry)	L 21–28	3,467	
October 7	at Holy Cross*	Fitton Field; Worcester, MA	L 30–35	4,497	
October 13	at No. 24 Princeton	Princeton Stadium; Princeton, NJ	L 3–17	10,136	
October 21	Cornell^{†}	Brown Stadium; Providence, RI	W 28–7	8,875	
October 28	at Penn	Franklin Field; Philadelphia, PA	W 30–27 ^{OT}	11,177	
November 4	Yale	Brown Stadium; Providence, RI	L 24–27	5,987	
November 11	at Dartmouth	Memorial Field; Hanover, NH	L 13–19	4,211	
November 18	Columbia	Brown Stadium; Providence, RI	L 21–22	4,611	
*Non-conference game; ^{†}Homecoming; Rankings from The Sports Network Poll released prior to the game
