= Jamie Wilson (American football) =

American football player (born 1973)

No. 73, 71
- Position: Offensive tackle

Personal information
- Born: June 6, 1973 (age 53); Newport News, Virginia
- Listed height: 6 ft 6 in (1.98 m)
- Listed weight: 300 lb (136 kg)

Career information
- High school: Gloucester (Gloucester, Virginia)
- College: Marshall
- NFL draft: 1997: undrafted

Career history
- Carolina Panthers (1997–1998); Green Bay Packers (1999)*; Indianapolis Colts (1999)
- * Offseason or practice squad member only

Awards and highlights
- NCAA I-AA national champion (1996)

Career NFL statistics
- Games played: 5
- Games started: 0
- Stats at Pro Football Reference

James Wesley Wilson (born June 6, 1973) is an American former professional football player who was an offensive tackle in the National Football League (NFL). He played college football for the Marshall Thundering Herd.

At Marshall, Wilson was a member of the 1996 NCAA Division I-AA National Championship team. In 2019, he was inducted into the Marshall Athletics Hall of Fame.

Wilson was signed as an undrafted free agent by the Panthers in 1997. However, Wilson never appeared in a regular season game with Carolina. He spent the 1998 season on injured reserve and was traded to the Green Bay Packers on August 3, 1999. He was waived by the Packers not long after. On August 12, 1999, he was claimed off waivers by the Indianapolis Colts. He played in five games for the Colts in 1999 and became a free agent after the season.
