= 2006 Lafayette Leopards football team =

American college football season

2006 Lafayette Leopards football

Patriot League co-champion

NCAA Division I First Round, L 14–35 at UMass
- Conference: Patriot League
- Record: 6–6 (5–1 Patriot)
- Head coach: Frank Tavani (7th season)
- Offensive coordinator: Mike Faragalli (7th season)
- Offensive scheme: Multiple
- Defensive coordinator: John Loose (7th season)
- Base defense: 4–3
- Home stadium: Fisher Stadium

2006 Patriot League football standings
	Conf.			Overall
Team	W		L	W		L
Lafayette +^	5	–	1	6	–	6
Lehigh +	5	–	1	6	–	5
Holy Cross	4	–	2	7	–	4
Bucknell	3	–	3	6	–	5
Colgate	3	–	3	4	–	7
Fordham	1	–	5	3	–	8
Georgetown	0	–	6	2	–	9
+ – Conference co-champions; ^ – FCS playoff participant; Rankings from The Sports Network poll

The 2006 Lafayette Leopards football team represented Lafayette College as member of the Patriot League during the 2006 NCAA Division I FCS football season. Led by seventh-year head coach Frank Tavani, the Leopards compiled an overall record of 6–6 with a mark of 5–1 in conference play, sharing the Patriot League title with Lehigh. Lafayette advanced to the NCAA Division I Football Championship playoffs, where the Leopards lost in the first round to UMass. Lafayette played home games at Fisher Field in Easton, Pennsylvania.

Before the first home game of 2006, Lafayette renovated the football team's longtime home stadium, Fisher Field. All games were broadcast on the Lafayette Sports Network (LSN).

== Schedule ==
Date	Time	Opponent	Rank	Site	TV	Result	Attendance	Source
September 2	2:00 p.m.	at Sacred Heart*		Campus Field; Fairfield, CT	LSN	W 21–14	1,411	
September 9	6:00 p.m.	at Bucknell	No. 25	Christy Mathewson–Memorial Stadium; Lewisburg, PA	LSN	W 31–0	6,273	
September 16	1:00 p.m.	Penn*	No. 22	Fisher Stadium; Easton, PA	LSN	L 11–21	9,251	
September 23	6:00 p.m.	at Princeton*		Princeton Stadium; Princeton, NJ	LSN	L 14–26	8,291	
September 30	1:00 p.m.	Yale*		Fisher Stadium; Easton, PA	LSN	L 34–37	4,389	
October 14	12:00 p.m.	at No. 15 Harvard*		Harvard Stadium; Boston, MA	LSN	L 7–24	10,807	
October 21	1:00 p.m.	Holy Cross^{†}		Fisher Stadium; Easton, PA	LSN	L 28–38	7,893	
October 28	1:00 p.m.	at Colgate		Andy Kerr Stadium; Hamilton, NY	LSN	W 27–10	2,010	
November 4	1:00 p.m.	at Fordham		Coffey Field; Bronx, NY	LSN	W 31–24	3,231	
November 11	1:00 p.m.	Georgetown		Fisher Stadium; Easton, PA	LSN	W 27–26	4,942	
November 19	1:00 p.m.	Lehigh		Fisher Stadium; Easton, PA (The Rivalry)	LSN	W 49–27	15,207	
November 25	12:00 p.m.	at No. 3 UMass*		McGuirk Stadium; Hadley, MA (NCAA Division I First Round)	LSN	L 14–35	5,388	
*Non-conference game; ^{†}Homecoming; Rankings from The Sports Network Poll released prior to the game; All times are in Eastern time
