= 2006 Dartmouth Big Green football team =

American college football season

2006 Dartmouth Big Green football
- Conference: Ivy League
- Record: 2–8 (2–5 Ivy)
- Head coach: Buddy Teevens (7th season)
- Captains: Preston Copley; Michael Rabil
- Home stadium: Memorial Field

2006 Ivy League football standings
	Conf.			Overall
Team	W		L	W		L
No. 18 Princeton +	6	–	1	9	–	1
No. 25 Yale +	6	–	1	8	–	2
Harvard	4	–	3	7	–	3
Penn	3	–	4	5	–	5
Cornell	3	–	4	5	–	5
Dartmouth	2	–	5	2	–	8
Columbia	2	–	5	5	–	5
Brown	2	–	5	3	–	7
+ – Conference co-champions; Rankings from The Sports Network poll

The 2006 Dartmouth Big Green football team was an American football team that represented Dartmouth College during the 2006 NCAA Division I FCS football season. The Big Green tied for last in the Ivy League.

In its second consecutive season under head coach Eugene "Buddy" Teevens (his seventh overall), the team compiled a 2–8 record and was outscored 244 to 147. Preston Copley and Michael Rabil were the team captains.

The Big Green's 2–5 conference record placed them in a three-way tie for sixth in the Ivy League standings. Dartmouth was outscored 146 to 105 by Ivy opponents.

Dartmouth played its home games at Memorial Field on the college campus in Hanover, New Hampshire.

== Schedule ==
Date	Opponent	Site	Result	Attendance	Source
September 16	at Colgate*	Andy Kerr Stadium; Hamilton, NY	L 7–28	5,828	
September 23	No. 1 New Hampshire*	Memorial Field; Hanover, NH (rivalry)	L 14–56	7,023	
September 30	at Penn	Franklin Field; Philadelphia, PA	L 10–17		
October 7	Yale	Memorial Field; Hanover, NH	L 14–26	7,307	
October 14	Holy Cross^{†}*	Memorial Field; Hanover, NH	L 21–24 ^{OT}	7,414	
October 21	at Columbia	Wien Stadium; New York, NY	W 20–7	3,647	
October 28	No. 23 Harvard	Memorial Field; Hanover, NH (rivalry)	L 0–28	2,028	
November 4	at Cornell	Schoellkopf Field; Ithaca, NY (rivalry)	L 25–28	3,788	
November 11	Brown	Memorial Field; Hanover, NH	W 19–13 ^{OT}	4,211	
November 18	at No. 18 Princeton	Princeton Stadium; Princeton, NJ	L 17–27	12,004	
*Non-conference game; ^{†}Homecoming; Rankings from The Sports Network Poll released prior to the game
