= 2006 Cornell Big Red football team =

American college football season

2006 Cornell Big Red football
- Conference: Ivy League
- Record: 5–5 (3–4 Ivy)
- Head coach: Jim Knowles (3rd season)
- Offensive coordinator: Clayton Carlin (3rd season)
- Offensive scheme: Multiple
- Base defense: 4–3
- Captains: Jonathan Lucas; Anthony Macaluso; Jaime McManamon
- Home stadium: Schoellkopf Field

2006 Ivy League football standings
	Conf.			Overall
Team	W		L	W		L
No. 18 Princeton +	6	–	1	9	–	1
No. 25 Yale +	6	–	1	8	–	2
Harvard	4	–	3	7	–	3
Penn	3	–	4	5	–	5
Cornell	3	–	4	5	–	5
Dartmouth	2	–	5	2	–	8
Columbia	2	–	5	5	–	5
Brown	2	–	5	3	–	7
+ – Conference co-champions; Rankings from The Sports Network poll

The 2006 Cornell Big Red football team represented Cornell University in the 2006 NCAA Division I FCS football season. Cornell tied for fourth in the Ivy League. They were led by third-year head coach Jim Knowles and played their home games at Schoellkopf Field in Ithaca, New York. Cornell finished the season 5–5 overall and 3–4 in Ivy League play.

== Schedule ==
Date	Time	Opponent	Site	Result	Attendance	Source
September 16	7:00 p.m.	at Bucknell*	Christy Mathewson–Memorial Stadium; Lewisburg, PA	L 5–20	6,152	
September 23	1:00 p.m.	Yale	Schoellkopf Field; Ithaca, NY	L 9–21	4,882	
September 30	7:00 p.m.	Albany*	Schoellkopf Field; Ithaca, NY	W 23–21	6,571	
October 7	12:30 p.m.	at Harvard	Harvard Stadium; Boston, MA	L 23–33	13,287	
October 14	1:00 p.m.	Colgate*	Schoellkopf Field; Ithaca, NY (rivalry)	W 38–14	9,142	
October 21	1:00 p.m.	at Brown	Brown Stadium; Providence, RI	L 7–28	8,875	
October 28	1:00 p.m.	No. 18 Princeton	Schoellkopf Field; Ithaca, NY	W 14–7	2,852	
November 4	12:00 p.m.	Dartmouth	Schoellkopf Field; Ithaca, NY (rivalry)	W 28–25	3,788	
November 11	12:30 p.m.	at Columbia	Wien Stadium; New York, NY (rivalry)	L 14–21	4,454	
November 18	1:00 p.m.	Penn	Schoellkopf Field; Ithaca, NY (rivalry)	W 28–27	2,809	
*Non-conference game; Rankings from The Sports Network Poll released prior to the game; All times are in Eastern time
