= 2006 Princeton Tigers football team =

American college football season

2006 Princeton Tigers football

Ivy League co-champion
- Conference: Ivy League

Ranking
- Sports Network: No. 18
- Record: 9–1 (6–1 Ivy)
- Head coach: Roger Hughes (7th season)
- Home stadium: Princeton Stadium

2006 Ivy League football standings
| | Conf. | | | Overall |
| Team | W | | L | W | | L |
|---|---|---|---|---|---|---|
| No. 18 Princeton + | 6 | – | 1 | 9 | – | 1 |
| No. 25 Yale + | 6 | – | 1 | 8 | – | 2 |
| Harvard | 4 | – | 3 | 7 | – | 3 |
| Penn | 3 | – | 4 | 5 | – | 5 |
| Cornell | 3 | – | 4 | 5 | – | 5 |
| Dartmouth | 2 | – | 5 | 2 | – | 8 |
| Columbia | 2 | – | 5 | 5 | – | 5 |
| Brown | 2 | – | 5 | 3 | – | 7 |
+ – Conference co-champions; Rankings from The Sports Network poll

The 2006 Princeton Tigers football team represented Princeton University in the 2006 NCAA Division I FCS football season. The team was coached by Roger Hughes and played their home games at Princeton Stadium in Princeton, New Jersey. Princeton shared the Ivy League championship. The 2006 season was Princeton's first nine-win season since the 1964 season.

== Schedule ==
| Date | Time | Opponent | Rank | Site | Result | Attendance | Source |
|---|---|---|---|---|---|---|---|
| September 16 | 1:00 p.m. | at Lehigh* | | Goodman Stadium; Bethlehem, PA | W 14–10 | 8,667 | |
| September 23 | 6:00 p.m. | Lafayette* | | Princeton Stadium; Princeton, NJ | W 26–14 | 8,291 | |
| September 30 | 1:30 p.m. | at Columbia | | Wien Stadium; New York, NY | W 19–6 | 8,845 | |
| October 7 | 1:00 p.m. | at Colgate* | | Andy Kerr Stadium; Hamilton, NY | W 27–26 | 4,220 | |
| October 13 | 7:00 p.m. | Brown | No. 24 | Princeton Stadium; Princeton, NJ | W 17–3 | 10,136 | |
| October 21 | Noon | Harvard | No. 22 | Princeton Stadium; Princeton, NJ | W 31–28 | 16,284 | |
| October 28 | 1:00 p.m. | at Cornell | No. 18 | Schoellkopf Field; Ithaca, NY | L 7–14 | 2,852 | |
| November 4 | 1:00 p.m. | Penn | No. 23 | Princeton Stadium; Princeton, NJ | W 31–30 | 14,385 | |
| November 11 | 12:30 p.m. | at Yale | No. 21 | Yale Bowl; New Haven, CT | W 34–31 | 43,406 | |
| November 18 | 1:00 p.m. | Dartmouth | No. 18 | Princeton Stadium; Princeton, NJ | W 27–17 | 12,004 | |
*Non-conference game; Rankings from The Sports Network Poll released prior to the game; All times are in Eastern time
