= 2006 Georgetown Hoyas football team =

American college football season

2006 Georgetown Hoyas football
- Conference: Patriot League
- Record: 2–9 (0–6 Patriot)
- Head coach: Kevin Kelly (1st season)
- Defensive coordinator: Rob Sgarlata (1st season)
- Captains: Alex Buzbee; Liam Grubb
- Home stadium: Multi-Sport Field

2006 Patriot League football standings
	Conf.			Overall
Team	W		L	W		L
Lafayette +^	5	–	1	6	–	6
Lehigh +	5	–	1	6	–	5
Holy Cross	4	–	2	7	–	4
Bucknell	3	–	3	6	–	5
Colgate	3	–	3	4	–	7
Fordham	1	–	5	3	–	8
Georgetown	0	–	6	2	–	9
+ – Conference co-champions; ^ – FCS playoff participant; Rankings from The Sports Network poll

The 2006 Georgetown Hoyas football team was an American football team that represented Georgetown University during the 2006 NCAA Division I FCS football season. Georgetown finished last in the Patriot League.

In their first year under head coach Kevin Kelly, the Hoyas compiled a 2–9 record. Alex Buzbee and Liam Grubb were the team captains.

The Hoyas were outscored 287 to 164. Their winless (0–6) conference record was the worst in the seven-team Patriot League standings.

Georgetown played its home games at Multi-Sport Field on the university campus in Washington, D.C.

== Schedule ==
Date	Opponent	Site	Result	Attendance	Source
September 2	Holy Cross	Multi-Sport Field; Washington, DC	L 13–26	1,845	
September 9	Stony Brook*	Multi-Sport Field; Washington, DC	W 7–0	1,950	
September 16	at Brown*	Brown Stadium; Providence, RI	L 21–34	4,656	
September 23	at Columbia*	Wien Stadium; New York, NY	L 21–23		
September 30	at Colgate	Andy Kerr Stadium; Hamilton, NY	L 14–31	3,031	
October 7	Lehigh	Multi-Sport Field; Washington, DC	L 3–28		
October 14	Bucknell	Multi-Sport Field; Washington, DC	L 7–17		
October 28	at Charleston Southern*	Buccaneer Field; North Charleston, SC	L 10–24	3,597	
November 4	Marist*	Multi-Sport Field; Washington, DC	W 24–21		
November 11	at Lafayette	Fisher Stadium; Easton, PA	L 14–45	4,942	
November 18	at Fordham	Coffey Field; Bronx, NY	L 30–38		
*Non-conference game
