= 1996 Appalachian State Mountaineers football team =

American college football season

1996 Appalachian State Mountaineers football
- Conference: Southern Conference

Ranking
- Sports Network: No. 25
- Record: 7–4 (5–3 SoCon)
- Head coach: Jerry Moore (8th season)
- Home stadium: Kidd Brewer Stadium

1996 Southern Conference football standings
	Conf.			Overall
Team	W		L	W		L
No. 1 Marshall $^	8	–	0	15	–	0
No. T–8 East Tennessee State ^	7	–	1	10	–	3
No. 13 Furman ^	6	–	2	9	–	4
No. 25 Appalachian State	5	–	3	7	–	4
The Citadel	3	–	5	4	–	7
Georgia Southern	2	–	6	4	–	7
VMI	2	–	6	3	–	8
Chattanooga	2	–	6	3	–	8
Western Carolina	1	–	7	4	–	7
$ – Conference champion; Rankings from The Sports Network poll

The 1996 Appalachian State Mountaineers football team was an American football team that represented Appalachian State University as a member of the Southern Conference (SoCon) during the 1996 NCAA Division I-AA football season. In their eighth year under head coach Jerry Moore, the Mountaineers compiled an overall record of 7–4, with a conference mark of 5–3.

== Schedule ==
Date	Opponent	Rank	Site	Result	Attendance	Source
August 29	at Wake Forest*	No. 4	Groves Stadium; Winston-Salem, NC	L 13–19	21,129	
September 7	Tennessee Tech*	No. 7	Kidd Brewer Stadium; Boone, NC	W 16–3	14,383	
September 21	at No. 25 Eastern Kentucky*	No. 5	Roy Kidd Stadium; Richmond, KY	W 21–14	4,800	
September 28	The Citadel	No. 4	Kidd Brewer Stadium; Boone, NC	W 34–20	13,231	
October 5	at East Tennessee State	No. 4	Memorial Center; Johnson City, TN	L 10–31	10,416	
October 12	No. 13 Furman	No. 14	Kidd Brewer Stadium; Boone, NC	L 14–20	12,111	
October 19	at Georgia Southern	No. 21	Paulson Stadium; Statesboro, GA (rivalry)	W 35–28	11,074	
October 26	No. 1 Marshall	No. 20	Kidd Brewer Stadium; Boone, NC (rivalry)	L 10–24	23,458	
November 2	at Chattanooga		Chamberlain Field; Chattanooga, TN	W 20–6	6,487	
November 16	at Western Carolina		Whitmire Stadium; Cullowhee, NC (rivalry)	W 24–17	11,316	
November 23	VMI	No. 25	Kidd Brewer Stadium; Boone, NC	W 26–14	8,260	
*Non-conference game; Rankings from The Sports Network Poll released prior to the game
