= 2006 Harvard Crimson football team =

American college football season

2006 Harvard Crimson football
- Conference: Ivy League
- Record: 7–3 (4–3 Ivy)
- Head coach: Tim Murphy (13th season)
- Offensive coordinator: Joel Lamb (1st season)
- Offensive scheme: Spread
- Defensive coordinator: Kevin Doherty (5th season)
- Base defense: 3–4
- Home stadium: Harvard Stadium

2006 Ivy League football standings
| | Conf. | | | Overall |
| Team | W | | L | W | | L |
|---|---|---|---|---|---|---|
| No. 18 Princeton + | 6 | – | 1 | 9 | – | 1 |
| No. 25 Yale + | 6 | – | 1 | 8 | – | 2 |
| Harvard | 4 | – | 3 | 7 | – | 3 |
| Penn | 3 | – | 4 | 5 | – | 5 |
| Cornell | 3 | – | 4 | 5 | – | 5 |
| Dartmouth | 2 | – | 5 | 2 | – | 8 |
| Columbia | 2 | – | 5 | 5 | – | 5 |
| Brown | 2 | – | 5 | 3 | – | 7 |
+ – Conference co-champions; Rankings from The Sports Network poll

The 2006 Harvard Crimson football team represented Harvard University in the 2006 NCAA Division I FCS football season. Harvard finished the season with an overall record of 7–3, placing third among Ivy league teams with a conference mark of 4–3.

== Schedule ==
| Date | Opponent | Site | Result | Attendance | Source |
|---|---|---|---|---|---|
| September 16 | Holy Cross* | Harvard Stadium; Boston, MA | W 31–14 | 11,209 | |
| September 23 | at Brown | Brown Stadium; Providence, RI | W 38–21 | 8,456 | |
| September 30 | at Lehigh* | Goodman Stadium; Bethlehem, PA | W 35–33 | 10,680 | |
| October 7 | Cornell | Schoellkopf Field; Ithaca, NY | W 33–23 | 13,287 | |
| October 14 | Lafayette* | Harvard Stadium; Boston, MA | W 24–7 | 10,807 | |
| October 21 | at Princeton | Princeton Stadium; Princeton, NJ (rivalry) | L 31–28 | 16,284 | |
| October 28 | at Dartmouth | Memorial Field; Hanover, NH (rivalry) | W 28–0 | 2,028 | |
| November 4 | Columbia | Harvard Stadium; Boston, MA | W 24–7 | 11,716 | |
| November 11 | at Penn | Franklin Field; Philadelphia, PA (rivalry) | L 22–13 | 7,819 | |
| November 18 | Yale | Harvard Stadium; Boston, MA (The Game) | L 34–13 | 30,723 | |
*Non-conference game
