= 2006 Yale Bulldogs football team =

American college football season

2006 Yale Bulldogs football

Ivy League co-champion
- Conference: Ivy League

Ranking
- Sports Network: No. 25
- Record: 8–2 (6–1 Ivy)
- Head coach: Jack Siedlecki (10th season)
- Home stadium: Yale Bowl

2006 Ivy League football standings
	Conf.			Overall
Team	W		L	W		L
No. 18 Princeton +	6	–	1	9	–	1
No. 25 Yale +	6	–	1	8	–	2
Harvard	4	–	3	7	–	3
Penn	3	–	4	5	–	5
Cornell	3	–	4	5	–	5
Dartmouth	2	–	5	2	–	8
Columbia	2	–	5	5	–	5
Brown	2	–	5	3	–	7
+ – Conference co-champions; Rankings from The Sports Network poll

The 2006 Yale Bulldogs football team represented Yale University in the 2006 NCAA Division I FCS football season. The Bulldogs were led by tenth-year head coach Jack Siedlecki, played their home games at the Yale Bowl and finished tied for first place in the Ivy League with a 6–1 record, 8–2 overall.

== Schedule ==
Date	Opponent	Site	Result	Attendance	Source
September 16	San Diego*	Yale Bowl; New Haven, CT	L 17–43	12,308	
September 23	at Cornell	Schoellkopf Field; Ithaca, NY	W 21–9	4,882	
September 30	at Lafayette*	Fisher Stadium; Easton, PA	W 37–34	4,389	
October 7	at Dartmouth	Memorial Field; Hanover, NH	W 26–14	7,307	
October 14	Lehigh*	Yale Bowl; New Haven, CT	W 26–20 ^{OT}	13,236	
October 21	Penn	Yale Bowl; New Haven, CT	W 17–14 ^{OT}	21,709	
October 28	Columbia	Yale Bowl; New Haven, CT	W 21–3		
November 4	at Brown	Brown Stadium; Providence, RI	W 27–24	5,987	
November 11	Princeton	Yale Bowl; New Haven, CT (rivalry)	L 31–34	43,406	
November 18	at Harvard	Harvard Stadium; Boston, MA (The Game)	W 34–13	30,723	
*Non-conference game
