= 1996 Western Carolina Catamounts football team =

American college football season

1996 Western Carolina Catamounts football
- Conference: Southern Conference
- Record: 4–7 (1–7 SoCon)
- Head coach: Steve Hodgin (7th season)
- Home stadium: E. J. Whitmire Stadium

1996 Southern Conference football standings
	Conf.			Overall
Team	W		L	W		L
No. 1 Marshall $^	8	–	0	15	–	0
No. T–8 East Tennessee State ^	7	–	1	10	–	3
No. 13 Furman ^	6	–	2	9	–	4
No. 25 Appalachian State	5	–	3	7	–	4
The Citadel	3	–	5	4	–	7
Georgia Southern	2	–	6	4	–	7
VMI	2	–	6	3	–	8
Chattanooga	2	–	6	3	–	8
Western Carolina	1	–	7	4	–	7
$ – Conference champion; Rankings from The Sports Network poll

The 1996 Western Carolina Catamounts team was an American football team that represented Western Carolina University as a member of the Southern Conference (SoCon) during the 1996 NCAA Division I-AA football season. In their seventh year under head coach Steve Hodgin, the team compiled an overall record of 4–7, with a mark of 1–7 in conference play, and finished ninth in the SoCon.

== Schedule ==
Date	Opponent	Site	Result	Attendance	Source
September 7	at No. 17 Liberty*	Williams Stadium; Lynchburg, VA	W 20–10	10,037	
September 14	Wofford*	E. J. Whitmire Stadium; Cullowhee, NC	W 24–6		
September 21	at The Citadel	Johnson Hagood Stadium; Charleston, SC	L 14–28	10,362	
September 28	East Tennessee State	E. J. Whitmire Stadium; Cullowhee, NC	L 10–49	7,085	
October 5	at No. 14 Furman	Paladin Stadium; Greenville, SC	L 30–45	11,215	
October 12	Georgia Southern	E. J. Whitmire Stadium; Cullowhee, NC	L 28–38	7,678	
October 19	at No. 1 Marshall	Marshall University Stadium; Huntington, WV	L 21–56	19,330	
October 26	Chattanooga	E. J. Whitmire Stadium; Cullowhee, NC	L 6–20	10,826	
November 2	at VMI	Alumni Memorial Field; Lexington, VA	W 28–14	4,781	
November 9	Elon*	E. J. Whitmire Stadium; Cullowhee, NC	W 45–28		
November 16	Appalachian State	E. J. Whitmire Stadium; Cullowhee, NC (rivalry)	L 17–24	11,316	
*Non-conference game; Rankings from The Sports Network Poll released prior to the game
