= 1996 NCAA Division I-AA Football Championship Game =

College American football game

1996 NCAA Division I-AA Football Championship
- I-AA National Championship Game
Montana Grizzlies	Marshall Thundering Herd
(14–0)	(14–0)
Big Sky	SoCon
29	49
Head coach: Mick Dennehy	Head coach: Bob Pruett
TSN / Seed; 2 / 1	TSN / Seed; 1 / 2
	1	2	3	4	Total
Montana	0	6	0	23	29
Marshall	14	9	16	10	49
- Date: December 21, 1996
- Season: 1996
- Stadium: Marshall University Stadium
- Location: Huntington, West Virginia
- Favorite: Marshall by 6.5
- Referee: Chuck Feevey
- Attendance: 30,052

United States TV coverage
- Network: ESPN
- Announcers: Brad Nessler (play-by-play) and Gary Danielson (analyst)

The 1996 NCAA Division I-AA Football Championship Game was a postseason college football game between the Marshall Thundering Herd and the Montana Grizzlies. The game was played on December 21, 1996, and was the last I-AA title game contested at Marshall University Stadium, now known as Joan C. Edwards Stadium, in Huntington, West Virginia. The culminating game of the 1996 NCAA Division I-AA football season, it was a rematch of the prior season's final, and was won by Marshall, 49–29. It was also Marshall's final game in Division I-AA, now known as Division I FCS; the Herd would move to Division I-A (now Division I FBS) the following July, joining the Mid-American Conference.

== Teams ==
The participants of the Championship Game were the finalists of the 1996 I-AA Playoffs, which began with a 16-team bracket. The location of the title game, Marshall University Stadium, was determined before the playoffs started.

=== Montana Grizzlies ===
Montana finished their regular season with a 14–0 record (8–0 in conference). Seeded first in the playoffs, the Grizzlies defeated 16-seed Nicholls State, sixth-seed East Tennessee State, and fourth-seed Troy State to reach the final. This was the second appearance for Montana in a Division I-AA championship game, as the team was the defending champion from 1995.

=== Marshall Thundering Herd ===
Marshall also finished their regular season with a 14–0 record (8–0 in conference). The Thundering Herd, seeded second, defeated 15-seed Delaware, tenth-seed Furman, and third-seed Northern Iowa to reach the final. This was the sixth appearance for Marshall in a Division I-AA championship game, having one prior win (1992) and four prior losses (1987, 1991, 1993, and 1995).

== Game summary ==
=== Scoring summary ===
Scoring summary

Quarter	Time	Drive			Team	Scoring information	Score	
Quarter	Time	Plays	Yards	TOP	Team	Scoring information	MONT	MAR
1	9:13	7	80	2:42	MAR	Randy Moss 19-yard touchdown reception from Eric Kresser, Tim Openlander kick good	0	7
1	2:09	7	94	2:58	MAR	Doug Chapman 61-yard touchdown run, Openlander kick good	0	14
2	14:08	1	70	0:09	MAR	Moss 70-yard touchdown reception from Kresser, Openlander kick no good (blocked)	0	20
2	8:14	9	63	3:17	MAR	20-yard field goal by Openlander	0	23
2	5:05	9	32	3:09	MONT	40-yard field goal by Andy Larson	3	23
2	0:15	9	58	2:39	MONT	27-yard field goal by Larson	6	23
3	14:05	3	62	0:55	MAR	Moss 54-yard touchdown reception from Kresser, Openlander kick good	6	30
3	5:03	7	47	3:33	MAR	Chapman 9-yard touchdown run, Openlander kick good	6	37
3	4:34				MAR	Safety: intentional grounding in the end zone by Montana QB Brian Ah Yat	6	39
4	14:51	5	62	1:34	MAR	Moss 28-yard touchdown reception from Kresser, Openlander kick good	6	46
4	10:52	10	58	3:59	MONT	Joe Douglass 28-yard touchdown reception from Ah Yat, 2-point pass good (Dallas Neil from Ah Yat)	14	46
4	7:09	7	75	1:45	MONT	Josh Branen 2-yard touchdown run, 2-point pass good (Douglass from Ah Yat)	22	46
4	4:18	6	34	2:51	MAR	37-yard field goal by Openlander	22	49
4	2:09	9	76	2:09	MONT	Josh Paffhausen 18-yard touchdown reception from Ah Yat, Larson kick good	29	49
"TOP" = time of possession. For other American football terms, see Glossary of American football.							29	49

=== Game statistics ===
	1	2	3	4	Total
No. 1 Grizzlies	0	6	0	23	29
No. 2 Thundering Herd	14	9	16	10	49

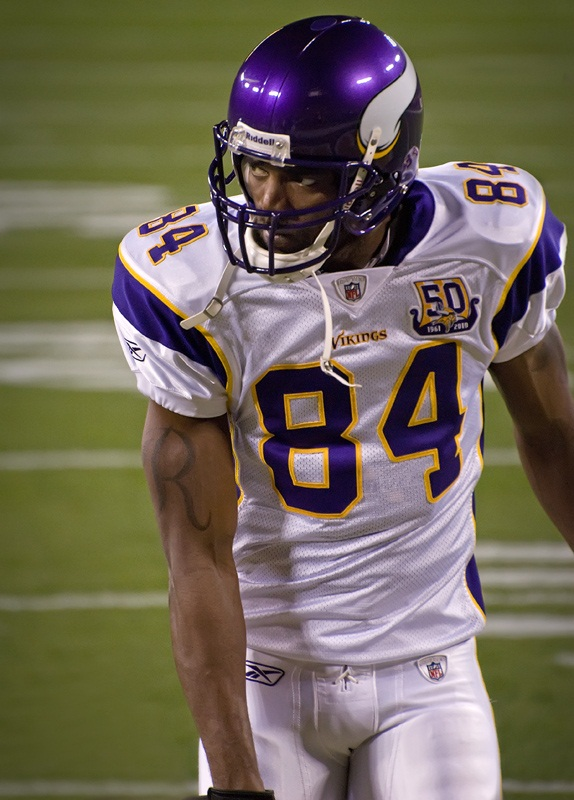
Marshall wide receiver Randy Moss

Statistics	MONT	MAR
First downs	31	21
Plays–yards	90–430	64–541
Rushes–yards	35–95	36–217
Passing yards	335	324
Passing: comp–att–int	36–55–1	18–28–0
Turnovers		
Time of possession	31:13	28:47

Team	Category	Player	Statistics
Montana	Passing	Brian Ah Yat	36–55, 335 yds, 2 TD, 1 INT
Montana	Rushing	Josh Branen	19 car, 101 yds, 1 TD
Montana	Receiving	Joe Douglass	13 rec, 117 yds, 1 TD
Marshall	Passing	Eric Kresser	18–28, 324 yds, 4 TD
Marshall	Rushing	Erik Thomas	20 car, 114 yds
Marshall	Receiving	Randy Moss	9 rec, 220 yds, 4 TD
