= Kevin Kelly (American football coach) =

American football player and coach (born 1960)

Current position
- Title: Head coach
- Team: New England (NH)
- Conference: CNE
- Record: 3-17

Biographical details
- Born: March 22, 1960 (age 66)

Playing career
- 1980–1981: Springfield (MA)
- Position: Safety

Coaching career (HC unless noted)
- 1981: Longmeadow HS (MA) (DC/DB)
- 1982–1983: Fieldston School (NY)
- 1984–1985: Southern Connecticut State (GA)
- 1986–1987: Syracuse (GA)
- 1988: Bowdoin (DC)
- 1989–1990: Northeastern (LB)
- 1991: Dartmouth (RB/LB)
- 1992–1994: Tulane (LB)
- 1995: Dartmouth (RB/LB)
- 1996–1998: Marshall (DC/LB)
- 1999: Syracuse (DB)
- 2000–2001: Marshall (DC)
- 2002–2005: Navy (ST/LB)
- 2006–2013: Georgetown
- 2014–2015: Ball State (DC/ILB)
- 2016–2017: Wyoming Seminary (PA)
- 2017–2018: Bryant (DC/LB)
- 2019–2020: New York Guardians (LB)
- 2023–present: New England (NH)

Head coaching record
- Overall: 27–80 (college); 5–11 (high school)

Kevin Kelly (born March 22, 1960) is an American football coach. He is the head football coach for New England College, a position he has held since 2023. He previously served as the head football coach at Georgetown University from 2006 to 2013, compiling a record of 24–63. Kelly was the defensive coordinator at Marshall University from 1996 to 1998 and from 2000 to 2001.

== Coaching career ==
In January 2006, Kelly was hired as the head football coach at Georgetown University. He resigned from the position in January 2014 to become the defensive coordinator at Ball State University.

In 2019, he was named linebackers coach for the New York Guardians of the XFL.

In 2023, Kelly was hired as the head football coach at New England College, marking the first coach for the school after a fifty-year hiatus from the sport.

== Head coaching record ==
=== College ===
| Year | Team | Overall | Conference | Standing | Bowl/playoffs |
|---|---|---|---|---|---|
Georgetown Hoyas (Patriot League) (2006–2013)
| 2006 | Georgetown | 2–9 | 0–6 | 7th | |
| 2007 | Georgetown | 1–10 | 1–5 | T–6th | |
| 2008 | Georgetown | 2–8 | 0–5 | 7th | |
| 2009 | Georgetown | 0–11 | 0–6 | 7th | |
| 2010 | Georgetown | 4–7 | 2–3 | 5th | |
| 2011 | Georgetown | 8–3 | 4–2 | T–2nd | |
| 2012 | Georgetown | 5–6 | 2–4 | T–3rd | |
| 2013 | Georgetown | 2–9 | 1–4 | T–5th | |
| Georgetown: | | 24–63 | 10–35 | | |
New England Pilgrims (Conference of New England) (2025–present)
| 2025 | New England | 1–9 | 1–6 | 7th | |
| 2026 | New England | 2–8 | 1–6 | | |
| New England: | | 3–17 | 2–12 | | |
| Total: | | 27–80 | | | |

=== High school ===
| Year | Team | Overall | Conference | Standing | Bowl/playoffs |
|---|---|---|---|---|---|
Wyoming Seminary Blue Knights () (2016–2017)
| 2016 | Wyoming Seminary | 2–6 | | | |
| 2017 | Wyoming Seminary | 3–5 | | | |
| Wyoming Seminary: | | 5–11 | | | |
| Total: | | 5–11 | | | |
