= Trey Brown (American football coach) =

American football coach

Current position
- Title: Special teams coordinator & quarterbacks coach
- Team: Muhlenberg
- Conference: Centennial

Biographical details
- Born: Longmont, Colorado, U.S.
- Education: University of Colorado Boulder (1993); Saint Mary's College of California (2003)

Coaching career (HC unless noted)
- 1998–2000: Stanford (assistant)
- 2001: Penn (TE)
- 2002–2005: Penn (WR)
- 2006–2009: Lehigh (OC/QB)
- 2010–2013: Muhlenberg (STC/QB)
- 2014–2017: Wilkes
- 2018: Lehigh (OA)
- 2019: Muhlenberg (WR)
- 2020–present: Muhlenberg (STC/QB)

Head coaching record
- Overall: 7–33

Trey Brown is an American college football coach. He is the special teams coordinator and quarterbacks coach for Muhlenberg College, positions he has held since 2020. He was the head football coach for Wilkes University from 2014 to 2017. He also coached for Stanford, Penn, and Lehigh.

== Head coaching record ==
| Year | Team | Overall | Conference | Standing | Bowl/playoffs |
|---|---|---|---|---|---|
Wilkes Colonels (Middle Atlantic Conference) (2014–2017)
| 2014 | Wilkes | 2–8 | 2–7 | 8th | |
| 2015 | Wilkes | 2–8 | 2–7 | T–8th | |
| 2016 | Wilkes | 3–7 | 3–6 | 7th | |
| 2017 | Wilkes | 0–10 | 0–9 | 10th | |
| Wilkes: | | 7–33 | 7–29 | | |
| Total: | | 7–33 | | | |
