= 1996 East Tennessee State Buccaneers football team =

American college football season

1996 East Tennessee State Buccaneers football

NCAA Division I-AA Quarterfinal, L 14–44 at Montana
- Conference: Southern Conference

Ranking
- Sports Network: No. T–8
- Record: 10–3 (7–1 SoCon)
- Head coach: Mike Cavan (5th season)
- Offensive coordinator: David McKnight (5th season)
- Defensive coordinator: Eric Schumann (5th season)
- Home stadium: Memorial Center

1996 Southern Conference football standings
	Conf.			Overall
Team	W		L	W		L
No. 1 Marshall $^	8	–	0	15	–	0
No. T–8 East Tennessee State ^	7	–	1	10	–	3
No. 13 Furman ^	6	–	2	9	–	4
No. 25 Appalachian State	5	–	3	7	–	4
The Citadel	3	–	5	4	–	7
Georgia Southern	2	–	6	4	–	7
VMI	2	–	6	3	–	8
Chattanooga	2	–	6	3	–	8
Western Carolina	1	–	7	4	–	7
$ – Conference champion; Rankings from The Sports Network poll

The 1996 East Tennessee State Buccaneers football team represented East Tennessee State University as a member of the Southern Conference (SoCon) during the 1996 NCAA Division I-AA football season. Led by Mike Cavan in his fifth and final season as head coach, the Buccaneers compiled an overall record of 10–3 with a mark of 7–1 in conference play, placing second in the SoCon behind Marshall. East Tennessee State advanced to the NCAA Division I-AA Football Championship playoffs, where they beat Villanova in the first round before falling to Montana in the quarterfinals.

== Schedule ==
Date	Opponent	Rank	Site	TV	Result	Attendance	Source
August 29	No. 14 Liberty*		Memorial Center; Johnson City, TN		W 24–20		
September 7	at East Carolina*		Dowdy–Ficklen Stadium; Greenville, NC		L 21–45	25,512	
September 14	Glenville State*		Memorial Center; Johnson City, TN		W 49–17	6,087	
September 21	VMI		Memorial Center; Johnson City, TN		W 38–0	4,711	
September 28	at Western Carolina		E. J. Whitmire Stadium; Cullowhee, NC		W 49–10	7,085	
October 5	No. 4 Appalachian State		Memorial Center; Johnson City, TN		W 31–10	10,416	
October 12	at The Citadel	No. 16	Johnson Hagood Stadium; Charleston, SC		W 41–20	16,212	
October 26	No. 8 Furman	No. 14	Memorial Center; Johnson City, TN		W 21–19	6,904	
November 2	at Georgia Southern	No. 9	Paulson Stadium; Statesboro, GA		W 17–14	12,611	
November 9	No. 1 Marshall	No. 7	Memorial Center; Johnson City, TN	WSAZ	L 10–34	13,131	
November 16	at Chattanooga	No. 11	Chamberlain Field; Chattanooga, TN		W 28–24	6,190	
November 30	No. 11 Villanova*	No. 8	Memorial Center; Johnson City, TN (NCAA Division I-AA First Round)		W 35–29	4,939	
December 7	at No. 2 Montana*	No. 8	Washington–Grizzly Stadium; Missoula, MT (NCAA Division I-AA Quarterfinal)		L 14–44	15,025	
*Non-conference game; Rankings from The Sports Network Poll released prior to the game
