= Matewan High School =

Coordinates: 37°38′32″N 82°10′32″W

Magnolia Matewan High School

Location
- 100 Tiger Lane; Matewan, Mingo County; West Virginia; United States

Information
- Established: 1914
- Closed: 2011
- Grades: 9-12
- Colour
- Team name: Tigers
- Rival: Burch High School
- Yearbook: Magnolian

Magnolia Matewan High School was a public high school located in Matewan, West Virginia. The school has been in a succession of four different buildings since 1914. It was formerly known as Magnolia District High School. The mascot is the tiger (Matewan Tigers). The colors seem to be debated occasionally, but usually consist of green and gold (the different shades of green, as well as white as opposed to gold are the subjects of the debates).

The school was located beside the middle school, and the two share the same cafeteria and parking lot.

Declining enrollment led to the consolidation of MHS with three of the other four county high schools to form Mingo Central High School in 2011.

== Notable alumni ==
- Don Blankenship, CEO of Massey Energy Co.
