= Mingo County Schools =

School district in West Virginia, United States

Mingo County Schools is the operating school district within Mingo County, West Virginia. It is governed by the Mingo County Board of Education.

== Schools ==
=== High schools ===
- Mingo Central High School
- Tug Valley High School

=== PK-8 Schools ===
- Burch PK-8
- Matewan PK-8
- Williamson PK-8
- Gilbert PK-8
- Lenore PK-8
- Kermit PK-8

=== Elementary schools ===
- Dingess Elementary School

=== Others ===
- Mingo Extended Learning Center
