= Mingo Central Comprehensive High School =

Mingo Central High School
- Mingo Central High School, October 2011

Location
- 1000 King Coal Highway; Delbarton, West Virginia 25670; United States; 37°38′33″N 82°5′6″W

Information
- School type: Public, high school
- Motto: Learners Today, Leaders Tomorrow
- Established: 2011
- School district: Mingo County Schools
- Superintendent: Joetta S. Basile
- Principal: Brandon Cline
- Teaching staff: 52.00 (FTE)
- Grades: 9, 10, 11, 12
- Age range: 14-18
- Enrollment: 622 (2025-2026)
- Average class size: 22
- Student to teacher ratio: 11.88
- Language: English
- Campus: Rural
- Campus size: 90 acres
- Colors: Carolina Blue; Black
- Fight song: Hail to the Miners
- Sports: Basketball, football, baseball, track and field, volleyball, softball, soccer, swim, golf
- Mascot: Miners
- Team name: Mingo Central Miners
- Rivals: Tug Valley High School
- Feeder schools: Burch Pk-8, Gilbert Pk-8, Matewan Pk-8, Williamson Pk-8
- Website: www.mingocentralhighschool.com

Mingo Central Comprehensive High School (also known as Mingo Central High School) is a public high school serving central and southern Mingo County, West Virginia. It is the consolidated result of high schools in Delbarton, Gilbert, Matewan and Williamson. It was designed by Williamson Shriver Architects, Inc. of Charleston. The school opened in August 2011.

MCHS is situated on 90 acres of land donated by Nicewonder Contracting Inc. and Alpha Natural Resources along the King Coal Highway in Newtown. The campus includes the main school complex and the upper athletic facilities, which includes James H. “Buck” Harless Stadium, a 6,000 seat football stadium. The building encompasses 172,535 square feet and includes a 2,200 seat gymnasium, a 400 seat auditorium with state of the art stage sets, a 480 seat commons area (cafeteria) with flat-screen televisions, an 80 member band room, and an auxiliary gym.

== Athletics ==
=== State Championships ===
==== Pre-Consolidation State Championships ====
Listed below are all championships won by Burch High School (B), Gilbert High School (G), Matewan High School (M), & Williamson High School (W).

	State Championship(s)	State Runner-Ups
Sport	Year(s)	Year(s)
Baseball	1948 (W), 1965 (W), 2003 (M)	1954 (W), 1979 (W)
Boys Basketball	1957 (B), 1964 (W), 1983 (W), 1986 (W), 1988 (W), 1989 (B), 1989 (W), 1991 (B), 1993 (B), 2001 (W)	1965 (W), 1972 (M), 1981 (W), 1992 (W), 1994 (B), 1996 (W), 1998(B)
Girls Basketball	1990 (B)	1983 (M), 1984 (M), 1991 (B)
Cheer	1995 (W)	1998 (M), 2000 (M), 2009 (G)
Football	1926 (W), 1944 (W), 1960 (W), 1961 (W), 1993 (M), 1995 (G)	1987 (M), 1991 (M), 1992 (M)

==== Post-Consolidation State championships ====
Listed below are all championships won by Mingo Central High School after 2011.

	State Championship(s)	State Runner-Ups
Sport	Year(s)	Year(s)
Football	2016 (AA)
