= Tug Valley High School =

Location
- 555 Panther Avenue; Williamson, West Virginia 25661; United States; 37°47′34″N 82°20′25″W

Information
- School type: Public, high school
- Established: 1987
- School district: Mingo County Schools
- Superintendent: Joetta S. Basile
- Principal: C. Doug Ward
- Teaching staff: 27.00 (FTE)
- Grades: 9, 10, 11, 12
- Age range: 14-21
- Enrollment: 335 (2023-2024)
- Student to teacher ratio: 12.41
- Language: English
- Campus: Rural
- Colors: Black; Silver
- Sports: Basketball, football, cheerleading, baseball, volleyball, softball, golf
- Mascot: Panther
- Team name: Tug Valley Panthers
- Rivals: Mingo Central High School
- Feeder schools: Lenore Pk-8, Kermit Pk-8
- Website: www.tugvalleyhighschool.com

Tug Valley High School is a consolidated school serving rural northern Mingo County, West Virginia, United States. The school has a Williamson postal address, but is actually located in Den's Branch at Naugatuck. The mascot is the Panther and the school colors are black and silver. The school has 358 students for athletic purposes and is thus placed in class A for athletic purposes in the state. Upon completion of Mingo Central High School in the fall of 2011, certain students in the Williamson area had the option of which school to attend. This consolidation left Mingo County with just two high schools.

== History ==
Tug Valley High School was opened in 1987 as a consolidation of Lenore High School and Kermit High School. Originally projected to open with 750 students, the school opened with around 650 students as a grade 10-12 high school. The school's grade configuration was changed in 1995 to incorporate the 9th grade for the 1995–96 school year.

Tug Valley High was built on the site of the old Waldron Farm in Den's Branch. It originally was designed with two floors with 25 classrooms, a 400-seat auditorium, a state of the art library, a modern gymnasium with a mezzanine, a cafeteria/commons area designed to seat 350, and a seven-room administrative office complex. The classrooms on the front and middle portions of the academic wing were designed with removable metal walls to allow for the possibility of utilizing the "open-classroom" concept to allow for expansion and team teaching.

The school had a four classroom addition added to the rear of the academic wing in 1992. This wing was utilized to house the school's Math Department. In 1995 a second four classroom addition was added to the front of the academic wing to further accommodate the increased enrollment due to the change in grade configuration. This wing was used to house the school's English Department.

The school was opened with an 1800-seat gymnasium. The school's football field was named "Bob Brewer Stadium" in honor of a longtime Mingo County Board of Education President who was a lifelong Naugatuck resident and businessman. The football stadium was designed to seat approximately 1,200 and had a press/announcer's box at the top of the "home" bleachers. The field also doubled as the school's baseball and girls' softball field under a movable configuration design. No concession or restroom areas were originally built. In 1990 a group of community athletic supporters raised funds to build a new facilities building on the field, complete with on-field dressing areas, public restrooms, concession facilities and weight training facilities. However, fundraising did not generate the needed amount, so a scaled down version of the facility was designed and built with public restrooms, concession area and a team filming area overhead, with all other features removed from the original design.

In the fall of 2011 plans were announced to build a long-awaited bridge to allow direct access from West Virginia Route 65 to the school facility. As part of those plans, it was announced that 2011 would be the last year the Panthers would play in Bob Brewer Stadium and that immediately following the 2011 football season, work would begin on the building of a new, modernized football stadium for the school that would be closer to the mouth of Den's Branch. New baseball-only and softball-only facilities would be built on the site of Bob Brewer Stadium along with tennis courts and a track. Phase I completion of the new stadium was scheduled for July 2012.

In 2025 U.S. News & World Report ranked the school as the ninth best high school out of the 114 high schools in all of West Virginia.

== Athletics ==
=== State Championships ===
==== Pre-Consolidation State Championships ====
Listed below are all championships won by Kermit High School (K) & Lenore High School (L).

	State Championship(s)	State Runner-Ups
Sport	Year(s)	Year(s)
Boys Basketball	1962 (L), 1964 (K), 1975 (K)	1950 (K), 1984 (L)

==== Post-Consolidation State championships ====
Listed below are all championships won by Tug Valley High School after 1987.

	State Championship(s)	State Runner-Ups
Sport	Year(s)	Year(s)
Boys Basketball	1999 (AA), 2012 (AA), 2013 (A), 2024 (A), 2025 (A), 2026 (A)	2001 (AA)
Girls Basketball	2021 (A)	2025 (A)
Cheer	2005 (A), 2009 (AA), 2011 (AA), 2012 (A), 2017 (A), 2018 (A), 2019 (A), 2021 (A), 2022 (A), 2023 (A), 2025 (A)	2006 (A), 2007 (A), 2010 (AA), 2026 (A)
