= 2006 NFL draft =

Selection of American football players

General information
- Date: April 29–30, 2006
- Time: Noon EDT (April 29); 11:00 am EDT (April 30)
- Location: Radio City Music Hall in New York City, New York
- Networks: ESPN, ESPN2, ESPNU, NFL Network

Overview
- 255 total selections in 7 rounds
- League: NFL
- First selection: Mario Williams, DE; Houston Texans
- Mr. Irrelevant: Kevin McMahan, WR; Oakland Raiders
- Most selections (12): Green Bay Packers
- Fewest selections (5): Atlanta Falcons
- Hall of Famers: 1: WR Devin Hester

The 2006 NFL draft, the 71st in league history, took place in New York City, New York, at Radio City Music Hall on April 29 and April 30, 2006. For the 27th consecutive year, the draft was telecast on ESPN and ESPN2, with additional coverage offered by ESPNU and, for the first time, by NFL Network.

Having signed a contract with the Houston Texans on the evening before the draft, Mario Williams, a defensive end from North Carolina State, became the draft's first pick. The selection surprised many commentators, who predicted that the Texans would draft Southern California running back Reggie Bush or Texas quarterback Vince Young, who would later immediately be drafted with the second and third overall picks by the teams that went on the clock after the Texans did, the New Orleans Saints (selecting Bush) and the Tennessee Titans (selecting Young), respectively.

Ohio State produced the most first-round selections (five), while Southern California produced the most overall selections (eleven). Twenty-seven compensatory and supplemental compensatory selections were distributed amongst seventeen teams; Tampa Bay, Baltimore and Tennessee each held three compensatory picks. The league also held a supplemental draft after the regular draft and before the regular season.

As of 2026, only two players from the 2006 class remain active in the NFL through free agency: tight end Marcedes Lewis and placekicker Matt Prater.

The 255 players chosen in the draft were composed of:

- 33 wide receivers
- 31 linebackers
- 26 safeties
- 23 defensive tackles
- 23 cornerbacks
- 22 defensive ends
- 22 offensive tackles
- 20 offensive guards
- 16 tight ends
- 14 running backs
- 13 quarterbacks
- 9 centers
- 3 fullbacks
- 2 kickers
- 2 punters

== Player selections ==
*	= compensatory selection
^	= supplemental compensatory selection
†	= Pro Bowler
‡	= Hall of Famer (Note: Players are identified as a Hall of Famer if they have been inducted into the Pro Football Hall of Fame.)

Positions key
Offense	Defense	Special teams
QB — Quarterback; RB — Running back; FB — Fullback; WR — Wide receiver; TE — Tight end; OL — Offensive lineman; T — Tackle; G — Guard; C — Center	DL — Defensive lineman; DT — Defensive tackle (Note: Includes nose tackle (NT)); DE — Defensive end; EDGE — Edge rusher; LB — Linebacker (Note: Includes middle linebacker (MLB/MIKE), weakside linebacker (WILL), strongside linebacker (SAM), off-ball linebacker, and outside linebacker (OLB)); DB — Defensive back; CB — Cornerback; S — Safety (Note: Includes free safety (FS) and strong safety (SS))	K — Kicker (Note: Also known as a placekicker (PK)); P — Punter; LS — Long snapper; RS — Return specialist (Note: Includes kickoff and punt returners)

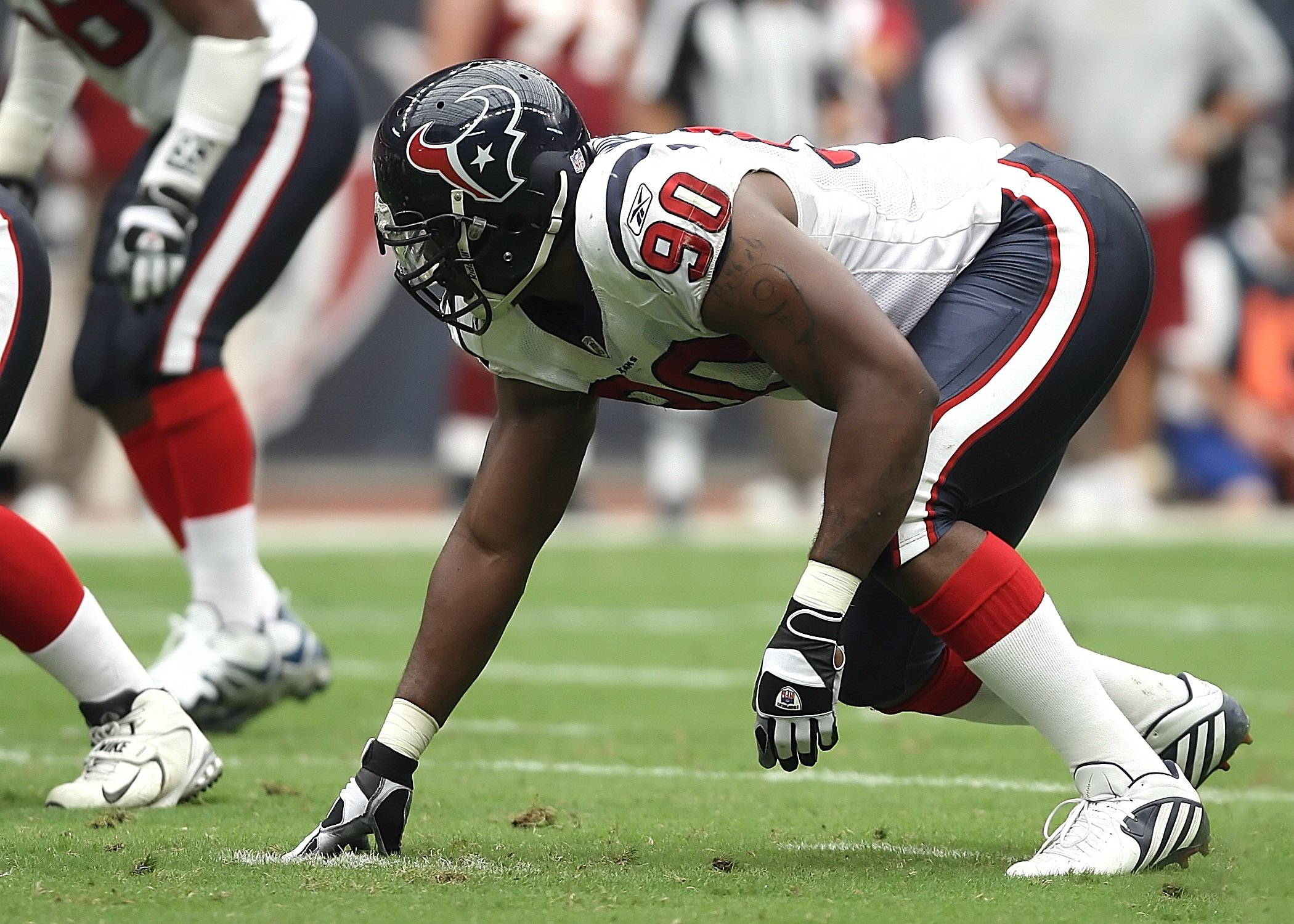
First overall pick Mario Williams was a four-time Pro Bowl selection and one-time All-Pro defensive end.

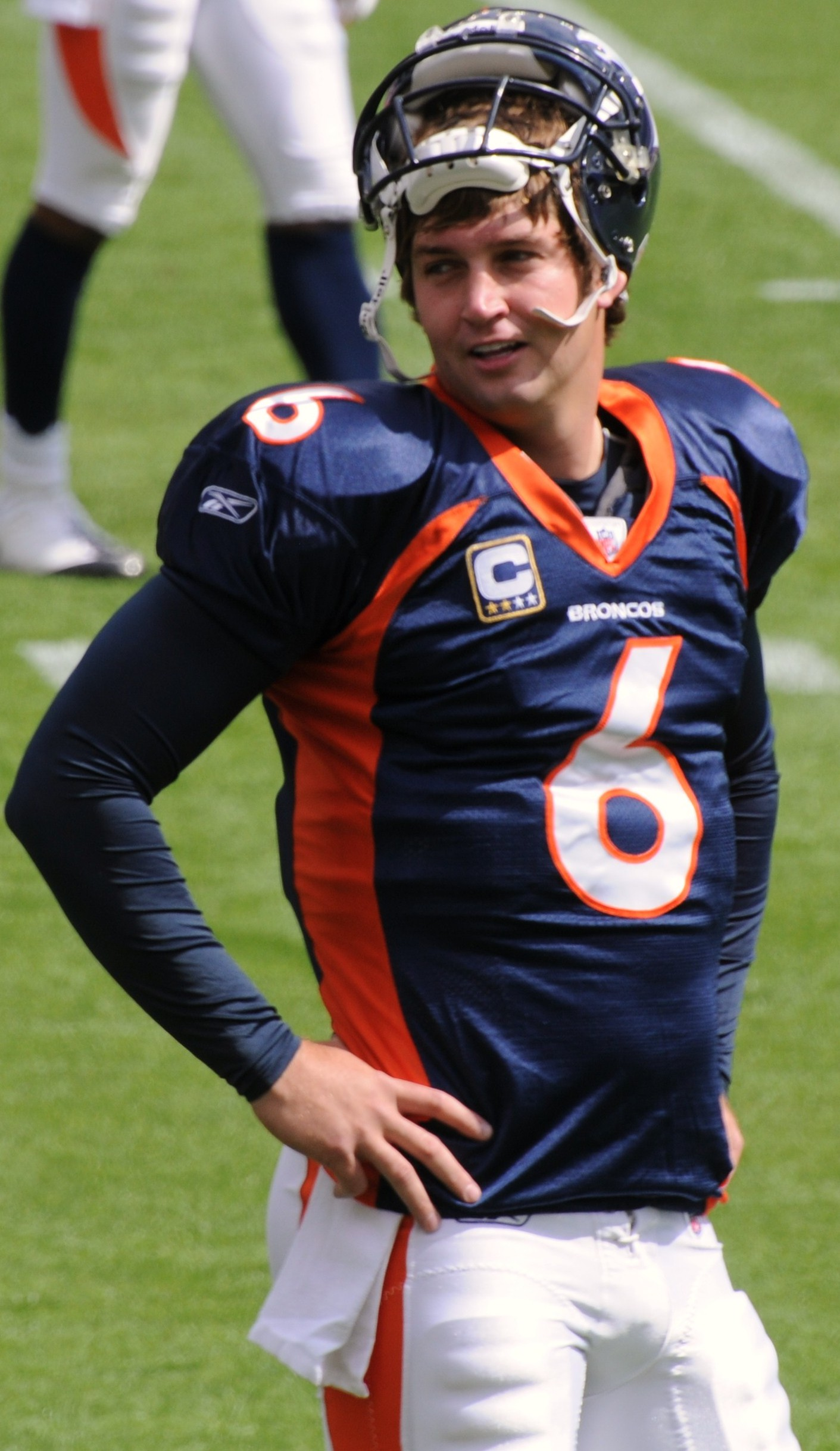
Quarterback Jay Cutler enjoyed a 12-year career in the league, receiving one Pro Bowl invite.

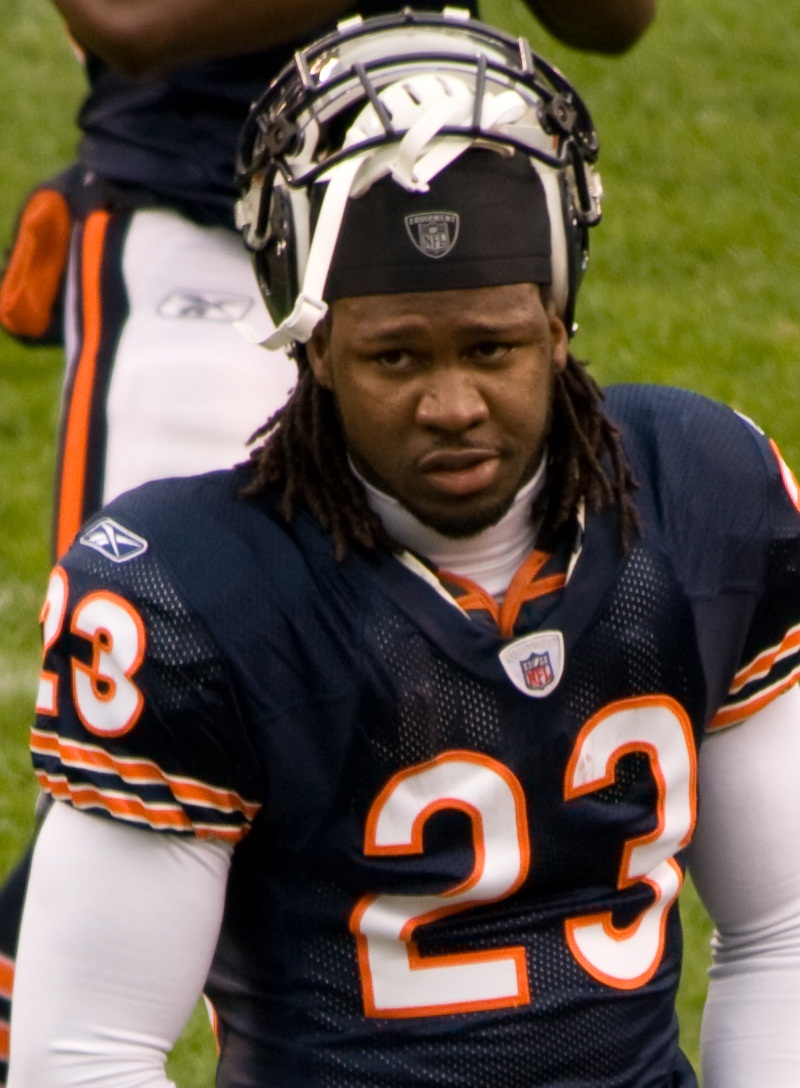
Wide receiver Devin Hester was drafted in the second round and holds several NFL records as a return specialist.

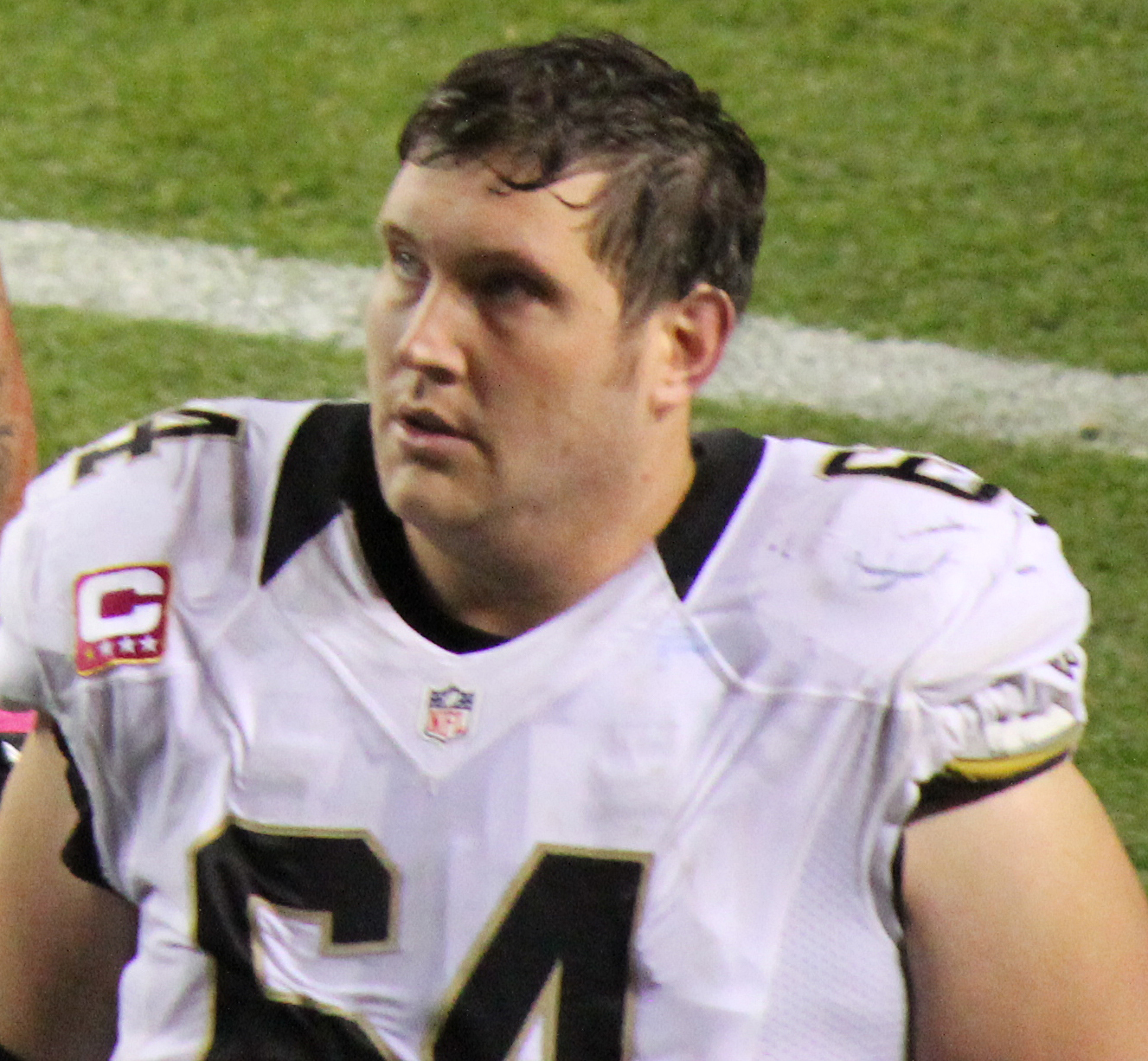
Zach Strief was drafted by the New Orleans Saints in the seventh round and part of the offensive line which won the Madden Most Valuable Protectors Award twice.

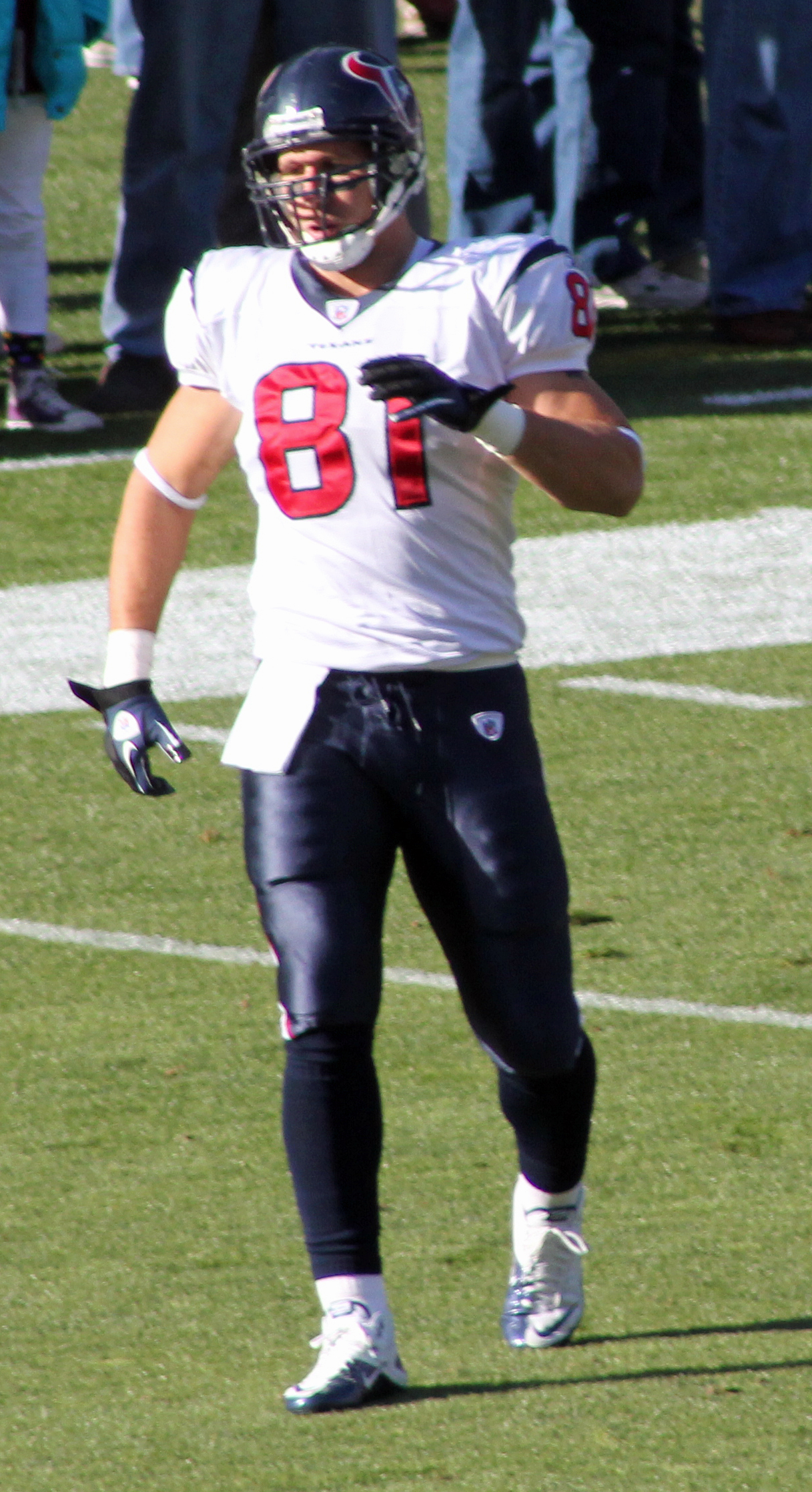
Owen Daniels was a fourth-round pick and a two-time Pro Bowl selection.

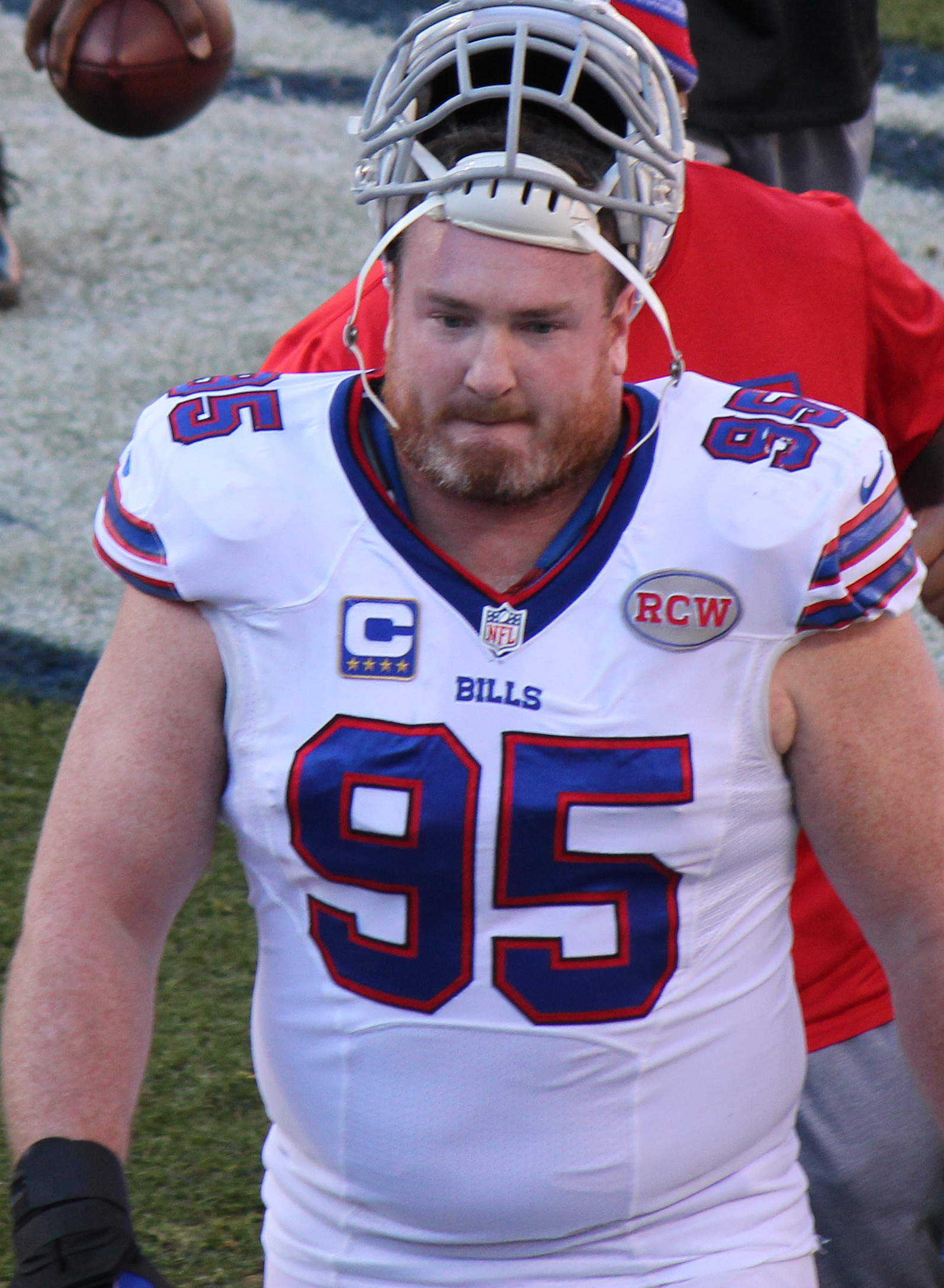
Kyle Williams was a fifth-round pick, six-time Pro Bowl selection and three-time All-Pro for the Buffalo Bills

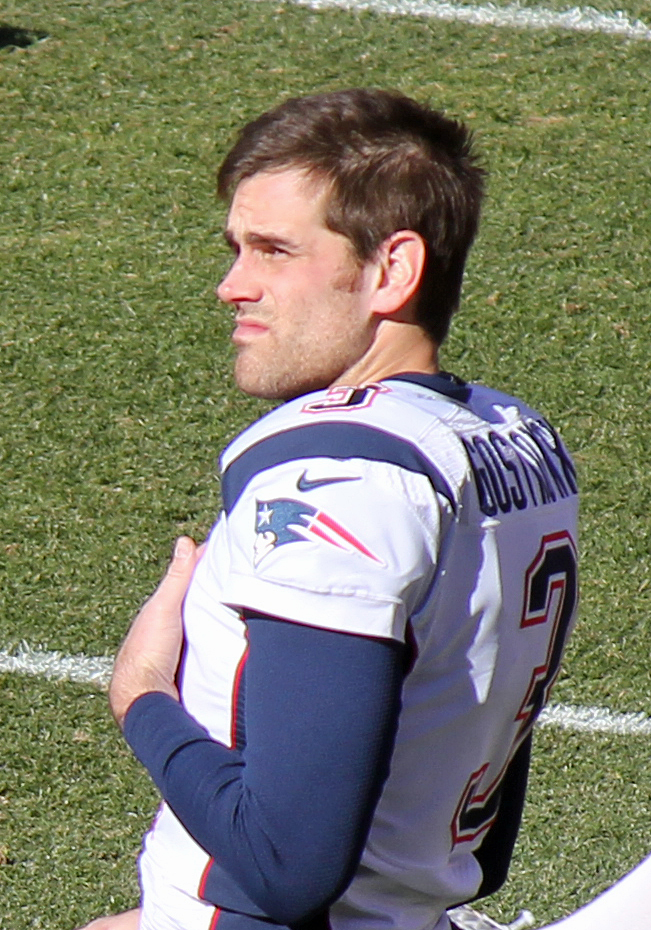
Despite being a fourth-round pick, Stephen Gostkowski holds many franchise and NFL records, including most consecutive Extra points, has been named to four Pro Bowls, three All-Pros, and is a three-time Super Bowl champion, during his 13-year career with the New England Patriots.

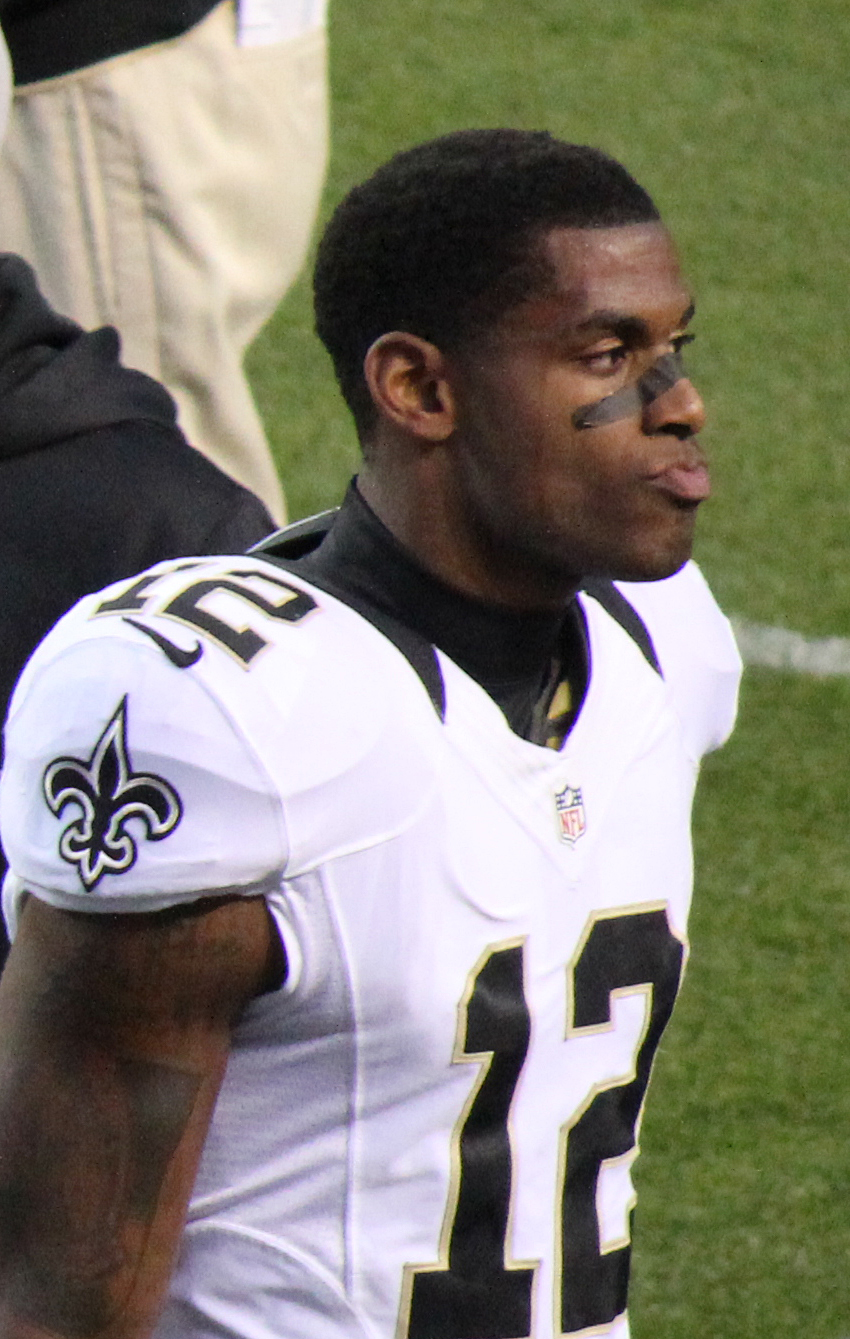
Marques Colston was a bottom-five seventh-round pick but went on to win Super Bowl XLIV with the New Orleans Saints and set a string of franchise records for receiving yards and touchdowns.

Rnd.	Pick	Team	Player	Pos.	College	Notes
1	1	Houston Texans	Mario Williams ^{†}	DE	NC State	
1	2	New Orleans Saints	Reggie Bush	RB	USC	2005 Heisman Trophy winner
1	3	Tennessee Titans	Vince Young ^{†}	QB	Texas	
1	4	New York Jets	D'Brickashaw Ferguson ^{†}	T	Virginia	
1	5	Green Bay Packers	A. J. Hawk	LB	Ohio State	
1	6	San Francisco 49ers	Vernon Davis ^{†}	TE	Maryland	
1	7	Oakland Raiders	Michael Huff	S	Texas	
1	8	Buffalo Bills	Donte Whitner ^{†}	S	Ohio State	
1	9	Detroit Lions	Ernie Sims	LB	Florida State	
1	10	Arizona Cardinals	Matt Leinart	QB	USC	2004 Heisman Trophy winner
1	11	Denver Broncos	Jay Cutler ^{†}	QB	Vanderbilt	from St. Louis (Note: No. 11: St. Louis → Denver (D). St. Louis traded a first-round selection (11th overall) to Denver in exchange for first- and third-round selections (15th and 68th overall).)
1	12	Baltimore Ravens	Haloti Ngata ^{†}	DT	Oregon	from Cleveland (Note: No. 12: Cleveland → Baltimore (D). Cleveland traded a first-round selection (12th) to Baltimore in exchange for first- and sixth-round selections (13th and 181st overall).)
1	13	Cleveland Browns	Kamerion Wimbley	DE	Florida State	from Baltimore (Note: No. 13: Baltimore → Cleveland (D). See No. 12: Cleveland → Baltimore.)
1	14	Philadelphia Eagles	Brodrick Bunkley	DT	Florida State	
1	15	St. Louis Rams	Tye Hill	CB	Clemson	from Atlanta via Denver (Note: No. 15: multiple trades: No. 15: Atlanta → Denver (PD). Atlanta traded a first-round selection (15th overall) to Denver in exchange for first- and third-round selections (29th and 93rd overanll), and a 2007 fourth-round selection. No. 15: Denver → St. Louis (D). See No. 11: St. Louis → Denver.)
1	16	Miami Dolphins	Jason Allen	S	Tennessee	
1	17	Minnesota Vikings	Chad Greenway ^{†}	LB	Iowa	
1	18	Dallas Cowboys	Bobby Carpenter	LB	Ohio State	
1	19	San Diego Chargers	Antonio Cromartie ^{†}	CB	Florida State	
1	20	Kansas City Chiefs	Tamba Hali ^{†}	DE	Penn State	
1	21	New England Patriots	Laurence Maroney	RB	Minnesota	
1	22	San Francisco 49ers	Manny Lawson	LB	NC State	from Washington via Denver (Note: No. 22: multiple trades: No. 22: Washington → Denver (PD). Washington traded first- and fourth-round selections (22nd and 119th), and a 2005 third-round selection to Denver in exchange for a 2005 first-round selection. No. 22: Denver → San Francisco (PD). Denver traded a first-round selection (22nd overall) to San Francisco in exchange for second- and third-round selections (37th and 68th overall).)
1	23	Tampa Bay Buccaneers	Davin Joseph ^{†}	G	Oklahoma	
1	24	Cincinnati Bengals	Johnathan Joseph ^{†}	CB	South Carolina	
1	25	Pittsburgh Steelers	Santonio Holmes	WR	Ohio State	from NY Giants (Note: No. 25: NY Giants → Pittsburgh (D). The NY Giants traded a first-round selection (25th overall) to Pittsburgh in exchange for first-, third- and fourth-round selections (32nd, 96th and 129th overall).)
1	26	Buffalo Bills	John McCargo	DT	NC State	from Chicago (Note: No. 26: Chicago → Buffalo (D). Chicago traded a first-round selection (26th overall) to Buffalo in exchange for second- and third-round selections (42nd and 73rd overall).)
1	27	Carolina Panthers	DeAngelo Williams ^{†}	RB	Memphis	
1	28	Jacksonville Jaguars	Marcedes Lewis ^{†}	TE	UCLA	
1	29	New York Jets	Nick Mangold ^{†}	C	Ohio State	from Denver via Atlanta (Note: No. 29: multiple trades: No. 29: Denver → Atlanta (PD). See No. 15: Atlanta → Denver. No. 29: Atlanta → NY Jets (PD). Atlanta traded a first-round selection (29th overall) to the NY Jets in exchange for DE John Abraham.)
1	30	Indianapolis Colts	Joseph Addai ^{†}	RB	LSU	
1	31	Seattle Seahawks	Kelly Jennings	CB	Miami (FL)	
1	32	New York Giants	Mathias Kiwanuka	DE	Boston College	from Pittsburgh (Note: No. 32: Pittsburgh → NY Giants (D). See No. 25: NY Giants → Pittsburgh.)
2	33	Houston Texans	DeMeco Ryans ^{†}	LB	Alabama	
2	34	Cleveland Browns	D'Qwell Jackson ^{†}	LB	Maryland	from New Orleans (Note: No. 34: New Orleans → Cleveland (D). New Orleans traded a second-round selection (34th overall) to Cleveland in exchange for a second-round selection (43rd overall) and C Jeff Faine.)
2	35	Washington Redskins	Rocky McIntosh	LB	Miami (FL)	from NY Jets (Note: No. 35: NY Jets → Washington (D). The NY Jets traded a second-round selection (35th overall) to Washington in exchange for second- and sixth-round selections (53rd and 189th overall), and a 2007 second-round selection.)
2	36	New England Patriots	Chad Jackson	WR	Florida	from Green Bay (Note: No. 36: Green Bay → New England (D). Green Bay traded a second-round selection (36th overall) to New England in exchange for second- and third-round selections (52nd and 75th overall).)
2	37	Atlanta Falcons	Jimmy Williams	CB	Virginia Tech	from San Francisco via Denver and Green Bay (Note: No. 37: multiple trades: No. 37: San Francisco → Denver (PD). See No. 22: Denver → San Francisco. No. 37: Denver → Green Bay (D). The Broncos traded a second-round selection (37th overall) to Green Bay in exchange for WR Javon Walker. No. 37: Green Bay → Atlanta (D). Green Bay traded second- and fifth-round selections (37th and 139th overall) to Atlanta in exchange for second-, third- and fifth-round selections (47th, 93rd and 148th overall).)
2	38	Oakland Raiders	Thomas Howard	LB	UTEP	
2	39	Philadelphia Eagles	Winston Justice	T	USC	from Tennessee (Note: No. 39: Tennessee → Philadelphia (D). Tennessee traded a second-round selection (39th overall) to Philadelphia in exchange for second- and fourth-round selections (45th and 116th overall).)
2	40	Detroit Lions	Daniel Bullocks	S	Nebraska	
2	41	Arizona Cardinals	Deuce Lutui	G	USC	
2	42	Chicago Bears	Danieal Manning	S	Abilene Christian	from Buffalo (Note: No. 42: Buffalo → Chicago (D). See No. 26: Chicago → Buffalo.)
2	43	New Orleans Saints	Roman Harper ^{†}	S	Alabama	from Cleveland (Note: No. 43: Cleveland → New Orleans (D). See No. 34: New Orleans → Cleveland.)
2	44	New York Giants	Sinorice Moss	WR	Miami (FL)	from Baltimore (Note: No. 44: Baltimore → NY Giants (D). Baltimore traded a second-round selection (44th overall) to the NY Giants in exchange for second- and third-round selections (56th and 87th overall).)
2	45	Tennessee Titans	LenDale White	RB	USC	from Philadelphia (Note: No. 45: Philadelphia → Tennessee (D). See No. 39: Tennessee → Philadelphia.)
2	46	St. Louis Rams	Joe Klopfenstein	TE	Colorado	
2	47	Green Bay Packers	Daryn Colledge	T	Boise State	from Atlanta (Note: No. 47: Atlanta → Green Bay (D). See No. 37: Green Bay → Atlanta.)
2	48	Minnesota Vikings	Cedric Griffin	CB	Texas	
2	49	New York Jets	Kellen Clemens	QB	Oregon	from Dallas (Note: No. 49: Dallas → NY Jets (D). Dallas traded a second-round selection (49th overall) to the NY Jets in exchange for second-, sixth- and seventh-round selections (53rd, 189th and 211th overall).)
2	50	San Diego Chargers	Marcus McNeill ^{†}	T	Auburn	
2	51	Minnesota Vikings	Ryan Cook	C	New Mexico	from Miami (Note: No. 51: Miami → Minnesota (PD). Miami traded a second-round selection (51st overall) to Minnesota in exchange for QB Daunte Culpepper.)
2	52	Green Bay Packers	Greg Jennings ^{†}	WR	Western Michigan	from New England (Note: No. 52: New England → Green Bay (D). See No. 36: Green Bay → New England.)
2	53	Dallas Cowboys	Anthony Fasano	TE	Notre Dame	from Washington via NY Jets (Note: No. 53: multiple trades: No. 53: Washington → NY Jets (D). See No. 35: NY Jets → Washington. No. 53: NY Jets → Dallas (D). See No. 49: Dallas → NY Jets.)
2	54	Kansas City Chiefs	Bernard Pollard	S	Purdue	
2	55	Cincinnati Bengals	Andrew Whitworth ^{†}	T	LSU	
2	56	Baltimore Ravens	Chris Chester	C	Oklahoma	from NY Giants (Note: No. 56: NY Giants → Baltimore (D). See No. 44: Baltimore → NY Giants.)
2	57	Chicago Bears	Devin Hester^{‡}^{†}	CB	Miami (FL)	
2	58	Carolina Panthers	Richard Marshall	CB	Fresno State	
2	59	Tampa Bay Buccaneers	Jeremy Trueblood	T	Boston College	
2	60	Jacksonville Jaguars	Maurice Jones-Drew ^{†}	RB	UCLA	
2	61	Denver Broncos	Tony Scheffler	TE	Western Michigan	
2	62	Indianapolis Colts	Tim Jennings ^{†}	CB	Georgia	
2	63	Seattle Seahawks	Darryl Tapp	DE	Virginia Tech	
2	64	Minnesota Vikings	Tarvaris Jackson	QB	Alabama State	from Pittsburgh (Note: No. 64: Pittsburgh → Minnesota (D). Pittsburgh traded a second-round selection (64th overall) to Minnesota in exchange for two third-round selections (83rd and 95th overall).)
3	65	Houston Texans	Charles Spencer	T	Pittsburgh	
3	66	Houston Texans	Eric Winston	T	Miami (FL)	from New Orleans (Note: No. 66: New Orleans → Houston (PD). New Orleans traded a third-round selection (66th overall) and a 2005 first-round selection to Houston in exchange for a 2005 first-round selection.)
3	67	Green Bay Packers	Abdul Hodge	LB	Iowa	
3	68	St. Louis Rams	Claude Wroten	DT	LSU	from San Francisco via Denver (Note: No. 68: multiple trades: No. 68: San Francisco → Denver (PD). See No. 22: Denver → San Francisco. No. 68: Denver → St. Louis (D). See No. 11: St. Louis → Denver.)
3	69	Oakland Raiders	Paul McQuistan	G	Weber State	
3	70	Buffalo Bills	Ashton Youboty	CB	Ohio State	from Tennessee
3	71	Philadelphia Eagles	Chris Gocong	LB	Cal Poly	from NY Jets (Note: No. 71: NY Jets → Philadelphia (D). The NY Jets traded a third-round selection (71st overall) to Philadelphia in exchange for third- and seventh-round selections (76th and 220th overall).)
3	72	Arizona Cardinals	Leonard Pope	TE	Georgia	
3	73	Chicago Bears	Dusty Dvoracek	DT	Oklahoma	from Buffalo (Note: No. 73: Buffalo → Chicago (D). See No. 26: Chicago → Buffalo.)
3	74	Detroit Lions	Brian Calhoun	RB	Wisconsin	
3	75	Green Bay Packers	Jason Spitz	C	Louisville	from Baltimore via New England (Note: No. 75: multiple trades: No. 75: Baltimore → New England (PD). Baltimore traded a third-round selection (75th overall), and 2005 third- and sixth-round selections to New England in exchange for a 2005 second-round selection. No. 75: New England → Green Bay (D). See No. 36: Green Bay → New England.)
3	76	New York Jets	Anthony Schlegel	LB	Ohio State	from Philadelphia (Note: No. 76: Philadelphia → NY Jets (D). See No. 71: NY Jets → Philadelphia.)
3	77	St. Louis Rams	Jon Alston	LB	Stanford	
3	78	Cleveland Browns	Travis Wilson	WR	Oklahoma	
3	79	Atlanta Falcons	Jerious Norwood	RB	Mississippi State	
3	80	Jacksonville Jaguars	Clint Ingram	LB	Oklahoma	from Dallas (Note: No. 80: Dallas → Jacksonville (D). Dallas traded a third-round selection (80th overall) to Jacksonville in exchange for third- and fourth-round selections (92nd and 125th overall).)
3	81	San Diego Chargers	Charlie Whitehurst	QB	Clemson	
3	82	Miami Dolphins	Derek Hagan	WR	Arizona State	
3	83	Pittsburgh Steelers	Anthony Smith	S	Syracuse	from Minnesota (Note: No. 83: Minnesota → Pittsburgh (D). See No. 64: Pittsburgh → Minnesota.)
3	84	San Francisco 49ers	Brandon Williams	WR	Wisconsin	from Washington
3	85	Kansas City Chiefs	Brodie Croyle	QB	Alabama	
3	86	New England Patriots	David Thomas	TE	Texas	
3	87	Baltimore Ravens	David Pittman	CB	Northwestern State	from NY Giants (Note: No. 87: NY Giants → Baltimore (D). See No. 44: Baltimore → NY Giants.)
3	88	Carolina Panthers	James Anderson	LB	Virginia Tech	from Chicago
3	89	Carolina Panthers	Rashad Butler	T	Miami (FL)	
3	90	Tampa Bay Buccaneers	Maurice Stovall	WR	Notre Dame	
3	91	Cincinnati Bengals	Frostee Rucker	DE	USC	
3	92	Dallas Cowboys	Jason Hatcher ^{†}	DE	Grambling State	from Jacksonville (Note: No. 92: Jacksonville → Dallas (D). See No. 80: Dallas → Jacksonville.)
3	93	St. Louis Rams	Dominique Byrd	TE	USC	from Denver via Atlanta and Green Bay (Note: No. 93: multiple trades: No. 93: Denver → Atlanta (PD). See No. 15: Atlanta → Denver. No. 93: Atlanta → Green Bay (D). See No. 37: Green Bay → Atlanta.)
3	94	Indianapolis Colts	Freddy Keiaho	LB	San Diego State	
3	95	Pittsburgh Steelers	Willie Reid	WR	Florida State	from Seattle via Minnesota
3	96	New York Giants	Gerris Wilkinson	LB	Georgia Tech	from Pittsburgh (Note: No. 96: Pittsburgh → NY Giants (D). See No. 25: NY Giants → Pittsburgh.)
3*	97	New York Jets	Eric Smith	S	Michigan State	
4	98	Houston Texans	Owen Daniels ^{†}	TE	Wisconsin	
4	99	Philadelphia Eagles	Max Jean-Gilles	G	Georgia	from New Orleans
4	100	San Francisco 49ers	Michael Robinson ^{†}	RB	Penn State	
4	101	Oakland Raiders	Darnell Bing	S	USC	
4	102	Tennessee Titans	Calvin Lowry	S	Penn State	
4	103	New York Jets	Brad Smith	QB	Missouri	
4	104	Green Bay Packers	Cory Rodgers	WR	TCU	
4	105	Buffalo Bills	Ko Simpson	S	South Carolina	
4	106	New England Patriots	Garrett Mills	TE	Tulsa	from Detroit
4	107	Arizona Cardinals	Gabe Watson	DT	Michigan	
4	108	New Orleans Saints	Jahri Evans ^{†}	T	Bloomsburg	from Philadelphia
4	109	Philadelphia Eagles	Jason Avant	WR	Michigan	from Green Bay via St. Louis
4	110	Cleveland Browns	Leon Williams	LB	Miami (FL)	
4	111	Baltimore Ravens	Demetrius Williams	WR	Oregon	
4	112	Cleveland Browns	Isaac Sowells	G	Indiana	from Atlanta
4	113	St. Louis Rams	Victor Adeyanju	DE	Indiana	from San Diego
4	114	Miami Dolphins	Joe Toledo	T	Washington	
4	115	Green Bay Packers	Will Blackmon	CB	Boston College	from Minnesota via Philadelphia
4	116	Tennessee Titans	Stephen Tulloch	LB	NC State	from Philadelphia via Dallas
4	117	New York Jets	Leon Washington ^{†}	RB	Florida State	from Kansas City
4	118	New England Patriots	Stephen Gostkowski ^{†}	K	Memphis	
4	119	Denver Broncos	Brandon Marshall ^{†}	WR	UCF	from Washington (Note: No. 119: Washington → Denver (PD). See No. 22: Washington → Denver.)
4	120	Chicago Bears	Jamar Williams	LB	Arizona State	
4	121	Carolina Panthers	Nate Salley	S	Ohio State	
4	122	Tampa Bay Buccaneers	Alan Zemaitis	CB	Penn State	
4	123	Cincinnati Bengals	Domata Peko	DT	Michigan State	
4	124	New York Giants	Barry Cofield	DT	Northwestern	
4	125	Dallas Cowboys	Skyler Green	WR	LSU	from Jacksonville (Note: No. 125: Jacksonville → Dallas (D). See No. 80: Dallas → Jacksonville.)
4	126	Denver Broncos	Elvis Dumervil ^{†}	DE	Louisville	
4	127	Minnesota Vikings	Ray Edwards	DE	Purdue	from Philadelphia via Indianapolis
4	128	Seattle Seahawks	Rob Sims	G	Ohio State	
4	129	New York Giants	Guy Whimper	T	East Carolina	from Pittsburgh (Note: No. 129: Pittsburgh → NY Giants (D). See No. 25: NY Giants → Pittsburgh.)
4*	130	Denver Broncos	Domenik Hixon	WR	Akron	
4*	131	Pittsburgh Steelers	Willie Colon	G	Hofstra	
4*	132	Baltimore Ravens	P. J. Daniels	RB	Georgia Tech	
4*	133	Pittsburgh Steelers	Orien Harris	DT	Miami (FL)	
5	134	Buffalo Bills	Kyle Williams ^{†}	DT	LSU	from Houston (Note: No. 134: Houston → Buffalo (PD). Houston traded a fifth-round selection (134th overall) to Buffalo in exchange for WR Eric Moulds.)
5	135	New Orleans Saints	Rob Ninkovich	DE	Purdue	
5	136	New England Patriots	Ryan O'Callaghan	T	California	from Oakland
5	137	Tennessee Titans	Terna Nande	LB	Miami (OH)	
5	138	Dallas Cowboys	Pat Watkins	S	Florida State	from NY Jets
5	139	Atlanta Falcons	Quinn Ojinnaka	T	Syracuse	from Green Bay (Note: No. 139: Green Bay → Atlanta (D). See No. 37: Green Bay → Atlanta.)
5	140	San Francisco 49ers	Parys Haralson	DE	Tennessee	
5	141	Detroit Lions	Jonathan Scott	T	Texas	
5	142	Arizona Cardinals	Brandon Johnson	LB	Louisville	
5	143	Buffalo Bills	Brad Butler	T	Virginia	
5	144	St. Louis Rams	Marques Hagans	WR	Virginia	
5	145	Cleveland Browns	Jerome Harrison	RB	Washington State	
5	146	Baltimore Ravens	Dawan Landry	S	Georgia Tech	
5	147	Philadelphia Eagles	Jeremy Bloom	WR	Colorado	
5	148	Green Bay Packers	Ingle Martin	QB	Furman	from Atlanta (Note: No. 148: Atlanta → Green Bay (D). See No. 37: Green Bay → Atlanta.)
5	–	Miami Dolphins	selection forfeited because of use of fifth-round selection in 2005 Supplemental draft			
5	149	Minnesota Vikings	Greg Blue	S	Georgia	
5	150	New York Jets	Jason Pociask	TE	Wisconsin	from Dallas
5	151	San Diego Chargers	Tim Dobbins	LB	Iowa State	
5	152	Cleveland Browns	DeMario Minter	CB	Georgia	from New England
5	153	Washington Redskins	Anthony Montgomery	DT	Minnesota	
5	154	Kansas City Chiefs	Marcus Maxey	CB	Miami (FL)	
5	155	Carolina Panthers	Jeff King	TE	Virginia Tech	
5	156	Tampa Bay Buccaneers	Julian Jenkins	DE	Stanford	
5	157	Cincinnati Bengals	A. J. Nicholson	LB	Florida State	
5	158	New York Giants	Charlie Peprah	S	Alabama	
5	159	Chicago Bears	Mark Anderson	DE	Alabama	
5	160	Jacksonville Jaguars	Brent Hawkins	DE	Illinois State	
5	161	Denver Broncos	Chris Kuper	G	North Dakota	
5	162	Indianapolis Colts	Michael Toudouze	G	TCU	
5	163	Seattle Seahawks	David Kirtman	FB	USC	
5	164	Pittsburgh Steelers	Omar Jacobs	QB	Bowling Green	
5*	165	Green Bay Packers	Tony Moll	T	Nevada	
5*	166	Baltimore Ravens	Quinn Sypniewski	TE	Colorado	
5*	167	Pittsburgh Steelers	Charles Davis	TE	Purdue	
5*	168	Philadelphia Eagles	Omar Gaither	LB	Tennessee	
5*	169	Tennessee Titans	Jesse Mahelona	DT	Tennessee	
6	170	Houston Texans	Wali Lundy	RB	Virginia	
6	171	New Orleans Saints	Mike Hass	WR	Oregon State	
6	172	Tennessee Titans	Jonathan Orr	WR	Wisconsin	
6	173	Washington Redskins	Reed Doughty	S	Northern Colorado	from NY Jets
6	174	New Orleans Saints	Josh Lay	CB	Pittsburgh	from Green Bay
6	175	San Francisco 49ers	Delanie Walker ^{†}	TE/FB	Central Missouri State	
6	176	Oakland Raiders	Kevin Boothe	T	Cornell	
6	177	Arizona Cardinals	Jonathan Lewis	DT	Virginia Tech	
6	178	Buffalo Bills	Keith Ellison	LB	Oregon State	
6	179	Detroit Lions	Dee McCann	CB	West Virginia	
6	180	Cleveland Browns	Lawrence Vickers ^{†}	FB	Colorado	
6	181	Cleveland Browns	Babatunde Oshinowo	DT	Stanford	from Baltimore (Note: No. 181: Baltimore → Cleveland (D). See No. 12: Cleveland → Baltimore.)
6	182	Dallas Cowboys	Montavious Stanley	DT	Louisville	from Philadelphia
6	183	Green Bay Packers	Johnny Jolly	DT	Texas A&M	from St. Louis
6	184	Atlanta Falcons	Adam Jennings	WR	Fresno State	
6	185	Green Bay Packers	Tyrone Culver	S	Fresno State	from Minnesota via Philadelphia
6	186	Kansas City Chiefs	Tre' Stallings	T	Ole Miss	from Dallas
6	187	San Diego Chargers	Jeromey Clary	T	Kansas State	
6	188	San Diego Chargers	Kurt Smith	K	Virginia	from Miami
6	189	New York Jets	Drew Coleman	CB	TCU	from Washington via NY Jets and Dallas (Note: No. 189: multiple trades: No. 189: Washington → NY Jets (D). See No. 35: NY Jets → Washington. No. 189: NY Jets → Dallas (D). See No. 49: Dallas → NY Jets.)
6	190	Kansas City Chiefs	Jeff Webb	WR	San Diego State	
6	191	New England Patriots	Jeremy Mincey	DE	Florida	
6	192	San Francisco 49ers	Marcus Hudson	S	NC State	from Tampa Bay
6	193	Cincinnati Bengals	Reggie McNeal	QB	Texas A&M	
6	194	Tampa Bay Buccaneers	Bruce Gradkowski	QB	Toledo	from NY Giants
6	195	Chicago Bears	J. D. Runnels	FB	Oklahoma	
6	196	Washington Redskins	Kedric Golston	DT	Georgia	from Carolina
6	197	San Francisco 49ers	Melvin Oliver	DE	LSU	from Jacksonville
6	198	Denver Broncos	Greg Eslinger	C	Minnesota	
6	199	Indianapolis Colts	Charlie Johnson	T	Oklahoma State	
6	200	Chicago Bears	Tyler Reed	G	Penn State	from Seattle
6	201	Pittsburgh Steelers	Marvin Philip	C	California	
6*	202	Tampa Bay Buccaneers	T. J. Williams	TE	NC State	
6*	203	Baltimore Ravens	Sam Koch ^{†}	P	Nebraska	
6*	204	Philadelphia Eagles	LaJuan Ramsey	DT	USC	
6*	205	New England Patriots	Dan Stevenson	G	Notre Dame	
6*	206	New England Patriots	Le Kevin Smith	DT	Nebraska	
6*	207	Indianapolis Colts	Antoine Bethea ^{†}	S	Howard	
6*	208	Baltimore Ravens	Derrick Martin	CB	Wyoming	
7	209	Cincinnati Bengals	Ethan Kilmer	S	Penn State	from Houston
7	210	New Orleans Saints	Zach Strief	T	Northwestern	
7	211	Dallas Cowboys	Pat McQuistan	T	Weber State	from NY Jets (Note: No. 211: NY Jets → Dallas (D). See No. 49: Dallas → NY Jets.)
7	212	Miami Dolphins	Fred Evans	DT	Texas State	from Green Bay
7	213	Jacksonville Jaguars	James Wyche	DE	Syracuse	from San Francisco
7	214	Oakland Raiders	Chris Morris	C	Michigan State	
7	215	Tennessee Titans	Cortland Finnegan ^{†}	CB	Samford	
7	216	Buffalo Bills	Terrance Pennington	T	New Mexico	
7	217	Detroit Lions	Fred Matua	G	USC	
7	218	Arizona Cardinals	Todd Watkins	WR	BYU	
7	219	Baltimore Ravens	Ryan LaCasse	DE	Syracuse	
7	220	New York Jets	Titus Adams	DT	Nebraska	from Philadelphia (Note: No. 220: Philadelphia → NY Jets (D). See No. 71: NY Jets → Philadelphia.)
7	221	St. Louis Rams	Tim McGarigle	LB	Northwestern	
7	222	Cleveland Browns	Justin Hamilton	S	Virginia Tech	
7	223	Atlanta Falcons	D. J. Shockley	QB	Georgia	
7	224	Dallas Cowboys	E. J. Whitley	C	Texas Tech	
7	225	San Diego Chargers	Chase Page	DT	North Carolina	
7	226	Miami Dolphins	Rodrique Wright	DT	Texas	
7	227	San Diego Chargers	Jimmy Martin	T	Virginia Tech	from Minnesota
7	228	Kansas City Chiefs	Jarrad Page	S	UCLA	
7	229	New England Patriots	Willie Andrews	S	Baylor	
7	230	Washington Redskins	Kili Lefotu	G	Arizona	
7	231	Cincinnati Bengals	Bennie Brazell	WR	LSU	
7	232	New York Giants	Gerrick McPhearson	CB	Maryland	
7	233	Miami Dolphins	Devin Aromashodu	WR	Auburn	from Chicago
7	234	Carolina Panthers	Will Montgomery	C	Virginia Tech	
7	235	Tampa Bay Buccaneers	Justin Phinisee	CB	Oregon	
7	236	Jacksonville Jaguars	Dee Webb	CB	Florida	
7	237	Carolina Panthers	Stanley McClover	DE	Auburn	from Denver
7	238	Indianapolis Colts	T. J. Rushing	CB	Stanford	from Tennessee via Indianapolis
7	239	Seattle Seahawks	Ryan Plackemeier	P	Wake Forest	
7	240	Pittsburgh Steelers	Cedric Humes	RB	Virginia Tech	
7*	241	Tampa Bay Buccaneers	Charles Bennett	DE	Clemson	
7*	242	St. Louis Rams	Mark Setterstrom	G	Minnesota	
7*	243	St. Louis Rams	Tony Palmer	G	Missouri	
7*	244	Tampa Bay Buccaneers	Tim Massaquoi	TE	Michigan	
7*	245	Tennessee Titans	Spencer Toone	LB	Utah	
7*	246	Tennessee Titans	Quinton Ganther	RB	Utah	
7*	247	Detroit Lions	Anthony Cannon	LB	Tulane	
7*	248	Buffalo Bills	Aaron Merz	G	California	
7*	249	Seattle Seahawks	Ben Obomanu	WR	Auburn	
7*	250	Washington Redskins	Kevin Simon	LB	Tennessee	
7^	251	Houston Texans	David Anderson	WR	Colorado State	
7^	252	New Orleans Saints	Marques Colston	WR	Hofstra	
7^	253	Green Bay Packers	Dave Tollefson	DE	Northwest Missouri State	
7^	254	San Francisco 49ers	Vickiel Vaughn	S	Arkansas	
7^	255	Oakland Raiders	Kevin McMahan	WR	Maine	

== Supplemental draft selections ==
For each player selected in the Supplemental Draft, the team forfeits its selection in that round in the draft of the following season.

Rnd.	Pick	Team	Player	Pos.	College	Notes
3	—	Cincinnati Bengals	Ahmad Brooks ^{†}	LB	Virginia	

== Notable undrafted players ==
†	= Pro Bowler

Original NFL team	Player	Pos.	College	Notes
Atlanta Falcons	Brent Grimes ^{†}	CB	Shippensburg	
Atlanta Falcons	Daniel Fells	TE	UC Davis	
Atlanta Falcons	Chris Reis	S	Georgia Tech	
Buffalo Bills	Ryan Neill	LS	Rutgers	
Carolina Panthers	Jarrett Bush	CB	Utah State	
Chicago Bears	Mark LeVoir	T	Notre Dame	
Chicago Bears	P. J. Pope	RB	Bowling Green	
Cincinnati Bengals	John Busing	S	Miami (OH)	
Cincinnati Bengals	Glenn Holt	WR	Kentucky	
Cincinnati Bengals	Nate Livings	G	LSU	
Dallas Cowboys	Miles Austin ^{†}	WR	Monmouth	
Dallas Cowboys	Stephen Bowen	DE	Hofstra	
Dallas Cowboys	Sam Hurd	WR	Northern Illinois	
Dallas Cowboys	Dennis Roland	T	Georgia	
Dallas Cowboys	Oliver Hoyte	FB/LB	NC State	
Denver Broncos	Mike Bell	RB	Arizona	
Detroit Lions	Matt Prater ^{†}	K	UCF	
Green Bay Packers	Zac Alcorn	TE	Black Hills State	
Green Bay Packers	Chris Francies	WR	UTEP	
Green Bay Packers	Jason Hunter	DE	Appalachian State	
Green Bay Packers	Jon Ryan	P	Regina	
Houston Texans	Mike Brisiel	G	Colorado State	
Houston Texans	Jeff Charleston	DE	Idaho State	
Houston Texans	Tramon Williams ^{†}	CB	Louisiana Tech	
Jacksonville Jaguars	Brian Iwuh	LB	Colorado	
Jacksonville Jaguars	Montell Owens ^{†}	RB	Maine	
Kansas City Chiefs	Rudy Niswanger	C	LSU	
Minnesota Vikings	Hank Baskett	WR	New Mexico	
Minnesota Vikings	Donald Penn ^{†}	T	Utah State	
New England Patriots	Remi Ayodele	DT	Oklahoma	
New Orleans Saints	McKinley Boykin	DT	Ole Miss	
New Orleans Saints	Steve Weatherford	P	Illinois	
New York Jets	Blake Costanzo	LB	Lafayette	
New York Jets	Joe Kowalewski	FB	Syracuse	
Oakland Raiders	Ricky Brown	LB	Boston College	
Oakland Raiders	John Madsen	TE	Utah	
Philadelphia Eagles	Jason Davis	FB	Illinois	
Pittsburgh Steelers	Scott Paxson	DT	Penn State	
St. Louis Rams	Donovan Raiola	C	Wisconsin	
San Diego Chargers	Steve Gregory	S	Syracuse	
Tennessee Titans	Ahmard Hall	FB	Texas	
Tennessee Titans	Colin Allred	LB	Baylor	
Washington Redskins	Mike Espy	WR	Ole Miss	
Washington Redskins	Spencer Havner	TE	UCLA	

== Hall of Famers ==
- Devin Hester, return specialist and wide receiver from Miami (FL), taken 2nd round, 57th overall by the Chicago Bears.

Inducted: Pro Football Hall of Fame Class of 2024.

== Trades ==
In the explanations below, (PD) indicates trades completed prior to the start of the draft (i.e. Pre-Draft), while (D) denotes trades that took place during the 2006 draft.

Round 1

Round 2

Round 3

Round 4

Round 5

Round 6

Round 7

== Miscellaneous ==
- This would be the final draft that Paul Tagliabue would preside over as Commissioner of the National Football League, as he retired on September 1.
- Two individuals declared for the draft never having played college football: Jai Lewis, a power forward for the George Mason basketball team that reached the semifinals of the 2006 NCAA Division I men's basketball tournament; and Ed Nelson, a power forward for the Connecticut basketball team. Lewis signed after the draft as a free agent with the New York Giants to play offensive tackle but subsequently pursued a professional basketball career, while Nelson signed with the St. Louis Rams to be a tight end. Nelson later turned to professional basketball himself.
- Having been banned in 2004 from playing college football at Colorado for having accepted endorsements while a member of the United States Ski Team, wide receiver and kick returner Jeremy Bloom was drafted in the fifth round by the Philadelphia Eagles.
- Virginia Tech quarterback Marcus Vick, who was dismissed from the Hokies team in January 2006 for repeatedly violating team rules, was undrafted; Vick, the younger brother of former Atlanta Falcons quarterback Michael Vick, later accepted an invitation to attend a Miami Dolphins minicamp and ultimately signed a contract with the team as a wide receiver. He was then released the following season.
- Running back John David Washington, son of actor Denzel Washington, went undrafted out of the Division II school Morehouse College, where he rushed for 1,198 yards in his senior season, setting a school record; Washington was signed as a free agent by the St. Louis Rams.
