= Steve Mooshagian =

American football player and coach (born 1959)

Current position
- Title: Head coach
- Team: Ventura
- Conference: NNL
- Record: 119–49

Biographical details
- Born: March 27, 1959 (age 67); Downey, California, U.S.
- Education: California State University, Fresno (B.S.); Columbia Pacific University (M.A.)

Playing career
- 1978–1979: Cerritos
- 1980–1981: Fresno State

Coaching career (HC unless noted)
- 1983–1984: Washington Union HS (CA)
- 1985–1994: Fresno State (assistant)
- 1995: Fresno City
- 1996: Nevada (OC)
- 1997–1998: Pittsburgh (OC)
- 1999–2002: Cincinnati Bengals (WR)
- 2003–2006: Sacramento State
- 2007–2008: San Diego (WR)
- 2009: Feather River
- 2010–present: Ventura

Head coaching record
- Overall: 11–33 (college); 129–59 (junior college)
- Bowls: 4–1 (junior college)
- Tournaments: 0–1 (CCCAA playoffs); 4–8 (SCFA playoffs)

Accomplishments and honors

Championships
- 1 SCFA (2018); 10 NNC / NNL (2012, 2014–2017, 2019, 2021–2023, 2025)

Awards
- ACCFCA Coach of the Year (2018); 8× NNC / NNL Coach of the Year (2012, 2014, 2016–2018, 2021–2023)

Steven Ray Mooshagian (born March 27, 1959) is an American football coach and former player. He is the head football coach at Ventura College in Ventura, California, a position he has held since 2010 with a record of 101 wins and 40 losses. Mooshagian served as the head football coach at Sacramento State from 2003 to 2006, compiling a record of 11–33. He was an assistant coach with the Cincinnati Bengals of the National Football League (NFL) from 1999 to 2002, Prior to that, he was the offensive coordinator at Nevada in 1996 and Pittsburgh from 1997 to 1998.

== Head coaching record ==
=== College ===
Year	Team	Overall	Conference	Standing	Bowl/playoffs
Sacramento State Hornets (Big Sky Conference) (2003–2006)
2003	Sacramento State	2–9	1–6	T–7th	
2004	Sacramento State	3–8	2–5	T–6th	
2005	Sacramento State	2–9	1–6	T–7th	
2006	Sacramento State	4–7	4–4	5th	
Sacramento State:		11–33	8–21		
Total:		11–33			

=== Junior college ===
Year	Team	Overall	Conference	Standing	Bowl/playoffs	CCCAA/3C2A^{#}
Fresno City Rams (Central Valley Conference) (1995)
1995	Fresno City	5–5	2–3	T–3rd		
Fresno City:		5–5	2–3			
Feather River Golden Eagles (Mid-Empire Conference) (2009)
2009	Feather River	5–5	2–2	3rd		
Feather River:		5–5	2–2			
Ventura Pirates (National Northern Conference / League) (2010–present)
2010	Ventura	5–5	2–3	T–4th		
2011	Ventura	7–4	3–2	T–2nd	W Beach Bowl	
2012	Ventura	10–1	6–0	1st	L Beach Bowl	
2013	Ventura	6–5	4–2	T–2nd	L Golden State Bowl	
2014	Ventura	6–5	5–1	1st	L National Bowl	
2015	Ventura	8–3	5–1	T–1st	W Beach Bowl	
2016	Ventura	8–3	5–0	1st	L National Bowl	
2017	Ventura	8–3	5–0	1st	L SFCA Semifinal	5
2018	Ventura	10–3	4–1	2nd	W SFCA Championship, L CCCAA Championship	
2019	Ventura	8–3	4–1	T–1st	L Beach Bowl	10
2020–21	No team—COVID-19					
2021	Ventura	10–1	5–0	1st	L SFCA Semifinal	5
2022	Ventura	7–4	3–2	T–1st	L SFCA Semifinal	10
2023	Ventura	8–4	6–1	T–1st	L SFCA Championship	6
2024	Ventura	8–3	5–2	T–2nd	W Beach Bowl	11
2025	Ventura	10–2	6–1	T–1st	L SFCA Semifinal	
Ventura:		119–49	68–17			
Total:		129–59				
National championship Conference title Conference division title or championship game berth
