= 2005 Tennessee State Tigers football team =

American college football season

2005 Tennessee State Tigers football
- Conference: Ohio Valley Conference
- Record: 2–9 (1–6 OVC)
- Head coach: James Webster (1st season)
- Home stadium: The Coliseum

2005 Ohio Valley Conference football standings
	Conf.			Overall
Team	W		L	W		L
No. 16 Eastern Illinois $^	8	–	0	9	–	3
Eastern Kentucky	7	–	1	7	–	4
Jacksonville State	6	–	2	6	–	5
Tennessee–Martin	4	–	4	6	–	5
Samford	4	–	4	5	–	6
Tennessee Tech	3	–	5	4	–	7
Southeast Missouri State	2	–	6	2	–	9
Tennessee State	1	–	6	2	–	9
Murray State	0	–	7	2	–	9
$ – Conference champion; ^ – NCAA Division I-AA playoff participant; Rankings from The Sports Network poll

The 2005 Tennessee State Tigers football team represented Tennessee State University as a member of the Ohio Valley Conference (OVC) during the 2005 NCAA Division I-AA football season. Led by first-year head coach James Webster, the Tigers compiled an overall record of 2–9, with a conference record of 1–6, and finished eighth in the OVC.

== Schedule ==
Date	Time	Opponent	Site	Result	Attendance	Source
September 3	6:00 p.m.	Alabama A&M*	The Coliseum; Nashville, TN (John Merritt Classic)	L 14–27	25,342	
September 10	6:00 p.m.	vs. Jackson State*	Liberty Bowl Memorial Stadium; Memphis, TN (Southern Heritage Classic)	W 20–14 ^{OT}	48,300	
September 17	12:00 p.m.	at Tennessee–Martin	Graham Stadium; Martin, TN	L 20–42	5,263	
September 24	3:15 p.m.	vs. Florida A&M*	Georgia Dome; Atlanta, GA (Atlanta Football Classic)	L 7–12	56,297	
October 1	3:10 p.m.	vs. North Carolina A&T*	RCA Dome; Indianapolis, IN (Circle City Classic)	L 3–16	42,310	
October 13	7:00 p.m.	at Tennessee Tech	Tucker Stadium; Cookeville, TN	W 31–20	10,226	
October 22	6:00 p.m.	Jacksonville State	The Coliseum; Nashville, TN	L 3–33	6,490	
October 29	1:30 p.m.	at Samford	Seibert Stadium; Homewood, AL	L 11–31	8,278	
November 5	6:00 p.m.	No. 25 Eastern Illinois	The Coliseum; Nashville, TN	L 3–27	23,481	
November 12	1:00 p.m.	at Southeast Missouri State	Houck Stadium; Cape Girardeau, MO	L 24–32	2,512	
November 19	2:30 p.m.	Eastern Kentucky	The Coliseum; Nashville, TN	L 0–49	4,779	
*Non-conference game; Rankings from The Sports Network Poll released prior to the game; All times are in Central time
