= 2005 Northern Arizona Lumberjacks football team =

American college football season

2005 Northern Arizona Lumberjacks football
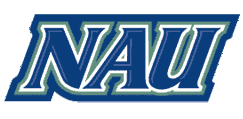
- Conference: Big Sky Conference
- Record: 3–8 (1–7 Big Sky)
- Head coach: Jerome Souers (8th season)
- Home stadium: Walkup Skydome

2005 Big Sky Conference football standings
	Conf.			Overall
Team	W		L	W		L
No. 13 Eastern Washington $^	5	–	2	7	–	5
No. 12 Montana ^	5	–	2	8	–	4
No. 18 Montana State	5	–	2	7	–	4
Portland State	4	–	3	6	–	5
Weber State	4	–	3	6	–	5
Idaho State	3	–	4	5	–	6
Sacramento State	1	–	6	2	–	9
Northern Arizona	1	–	6	3	–	8
$ – Conference champion; ^ – NCAA Division I-AA playoff participant; Rankings from The Sports Network poll

The 2005 Northern Arizona Lumberjacks football team was an American football team that represented Northern Arizona University (NAU) as a member of the Big Sky Conference (Big Sky) during the 2005 NCAA Division I FCS football season. In their eighth year under head coach Jerome Souers, the Lumberjacks compiled a 3–8 record (1–7 against conference opponents), were outscored by a total of 338 to 233, and finished in a tie for last place in the Big Sky.

The team played its home games at the J. Lawrence Walkup Skydome, commonly known as the Walkup Skydome, in Flagstaff, Arizona.

== Schedule ==
Date	Time	Opponent	Site	TV	Result	Attendance	Source
September 1		Adams State*	Walkup Skydome; Flagstaff, AZ		W 52–13		
September 10	7:00 p.m.	at Arizona*	Arizona Stadium; Tucson, AZ	FSNAZ	L 12–31	55,728	
September 17		Southern Utah*	Walkup Skydome; Flagstaff, AZ (rivalry)		W 27–7	7,543	
September 24	5:30 p.m.	at Weber State	Stewart Stadium; Ogden, UT		L 23–31	9,145	
October 1		at Sacramento State	Hornet Stadium; Sacramento, CA		L 24–38	7,061	
October 8		No. 15 Eastern Washington	Walkup Skydome; Flagstaff, AZ		L 14–42	8,974	
October 22		at No. 25 Portland State	PGE Park; Portland, OR		L 0–45		
October 29	12:05 p.m.	at No. 16 Montana State	Bobcat Stadium; Bozeman, MT		L 22–29	13,427	
November 5	3:05 p.m.	No. 4 Montana^{†}	Walkup Skydome; Flagstaff, AZ		L 0–23	9,109	
November 12		Idaho State	Walkup Skydome; Flagstaff, AZ		W 42–28	5,020	
November 19	4:05 p.m.	at Northern Iowa*	UNI-Dome; Cedar Falls, IA		L 17–41	8,142	
*Non-conference game; ^{†}Homecoming; Rankings from The Sports Network Poll released prior to the game; All times are in Mountain time
