= 2005 Sacramento State Hornets football team =

American college football season

2005 Sacramento State Hornets football
- Conference: Big Sky Conference
- Record: 2–9 (1–6 Big Sky)
- Head coach: Steve Mooshagian (3rd season)
- Defensive coordinator: Tim Skipper (2nd season)
- Home stadium: Hornet Stadium

2005 Big Sky Conference football standings
	Conf.			Overall
Team	W		L	W		L
No. 13 Eastern Washington +^	5	–	2	7	–	5
No. 12 Montana +^	5	–	2	8	–	4
No. 18 Montana State +	5	–	2	7	–	4
Portland State	4	–	3	6	–	5
Weber State	4	–	3	6	–	5
Idaho State	3	–	4	5	–	6
Sacramento State	1	–	6	2	–	9
Northern Arizona	1	–	6	3	–	8
+ – Conference co-champions; ^ – NCAA Division I-AA playoff participant; Rankings from The Sports Network poll

The 2005 Sacramento State Hornets football team represented California State University, Sacramento as a member of the Big Sky Conference during the 2005 NCAA Division I-AA football season. Led by third-year head coach Steve Mooshagian, Sacramento State compiled an overall record of 2–9 with a mark of 1–6 in conference play, tying for seventh place in the Big Sky. The team was outscored by its opponents 352 to 192 for the season. The Hornets played home games at Hornet Stadium in Sacramento, California.

== Schedule ==
Date	Opponent	Site	Result	Attendance	Source
September 3	at No. 19 (I-A) California*	California Memorial Stadium; Berkeley, CA	L 3–41	65,938	
September 10	at No. 19 Cal Poly*	Mustang Stadium; San Luis Obispo, CA	L 13–37	6,786	
September 17	at Portland State	PGE Park; Portland, OR	L 12–28	4,617	
September 24	UC Davis*	Hornet Stadium; Sacramento, CA (Causeway Classic)	L 7–37	10,187	
October 1	Northern Arizona	Hornet Stadium; Sacramento, CA	W 38–24	7,061	
October 8	No. 16 (NAIA) Azusa Pacific*	Hornet Stadium; Sacramento, CA	W 41–19	5,954	
October 15	at Weber State	Stewart Stadium; Ogden, UT	L 14–26	9,036	
October 22	Idaho State	Hornet Stadium; Sacramento, CA	L 17–27	4,451	
October 29	No. 14 Eastern Washington	Hornet Stadium; Sacramento, CA	L 17–45	3,102	
November 5	at No. 12 Montana State	Bobcat Stadium; Bozeman, MT	L 16–37	12,207	
November 12	No. 3 Montana	Hornet Stadium; Sacramento, CA	L 14–31	4,243	
*Non-conference game; Rankings from The Sports Network Poll released prior to the game
