= James Webster (American football) =

American football player and coach (born 1950)

Biographical details
- Born: August 27, 1950 (age 76)
- Education: Winston-Salem (NC) Atkins

Playing career
- 1969–1971: North Carolina
- Position: Linebacker

Coaching career (HC unless noted)
- 1973: North Carolina (assistant)
- 1974: Florida (assistant)
- 1975–1978: Kansas (assistant)
- 1979–1980: Colorado (LB)
- 1981–1983: Northwestern (assistant)
- 1988–1992: Wake Forest (assistant)
- 1993–1994: Dartmouth (ILB)
- 1995–1998: East Carolina (OLB)
- 1999: East Carolina (AHC/OLB)
- 2000: East Carolina (AHC/DL)
- 2001–2002: North Carolina (AHC/DE)
- 2003–2004: North Carolina (AHC/STC)
- 2005–2009: Tennessee State

Head coaching record
- Overall: 25–31

James Webster Jr. (born August 27, 1950) is an American former football player and coach. He was a standout defensive player for the Tar Heels. He was named the Most Valuable Defensive Player in the 1971 Gator Bowl and was the recipient of the ACC's Brian Piccolo Award in 1972. He served as the head football coach at Tennessee State University from 2005 to 2009, compiling a record of 25–31.

== Head coaching record ==
Year	Team	Overall	Conference	Standing	Bowl/playoffs
Tennessee State Tigers (Ohio Valley Conference) (2005–2009)
2005	Tennessee State	2–9	1–6	8th	
2006	Tennessee State	6–5	5–2	3rd	
2007	Tennessee State	5–6	4–3	5th	
2008	Tennessee State	8–4	5–3	4th	
2009	Tennessee State	4–7	3–4	5th	
Tennessee State:		25–31	18–18		
Total:		25–31			
