= 2005 Montana State Bobcats football team =

American college football season

2005 Montana State Bobcats football

Big Sky co-champion
- Conference: Big Sky Conference

Ranking
- Sports Network: No. 18
- Record: 7–4 (5–2 Big Sky)
- Head coach: Mike Kramer (6th season)
- Defensive coordinator: Pete Kwiatkowski (6th season)
- Home stadium: Bobcat Stadium

2005 Big Sky Conference football standings
	Conf.			Overall
Team	W		L	W		L
No. 13 Eastern Washington $^	5	–	2	7	–	5
No. 12 Montana ^	5	–	2	8	–	4
No. 18 Montana State	5	–	2	7	–	4
Portland State	4	–	3	6	–	5
Weber State	4	–	3	6	–	5
Idaho State	3	–	4	5	–	6
Sacramento State	1	–	6	2	–	9
Northern Arizona	1	–	6	3	–	8
$ – Conference champion; ^ – NCAA Division I-AA playoff participant; Rankings from The Sports Network poll

The 2005 Montana State Bobcats football team was an American football team that represented Montana State University in the Big Sky Conference during the 2005 NCAA Division I-AA football season. In their sixth season under head coach Mike Kramer, the Bobcats compiled a 7–4 record (5–2 against Big Sky opponents), finished in a three-way tie for the Big Sky championship with Eastern Washington and Montana, but did not receive a bid to the NCAA Division I-AA Football Championship playoffs. Montana State ranked No. 18 in final I-AA poll by The Sports Network.

== Schedule ==
Date	Time	Opponent	Rank	Site	TV	Result	Attendance	Source
September 3	5:05 p.m.	at Oklahoma State*	No. 18	Boone Pickens Stadium; Stillwater, OK		L 10–15	43,857	
September 10	1:05 p.m.	Stephen F. Austin*	No. 16	Bobcat Stadium; Bozeman, MT		W 42–6	13,327	
September 17	7:05 p.m.	at No. 18 Cal Poly*	No. 11	Mustang Stadium; San Luis Obispo, CA		L 10–38	8,043	
September 24	1:05 p.m.	No. 8 North Dakota State	No. 18	Bobcat Stadium; Bozeman, MT		W 20–17	13,327	
October 1	1:35 p.m.	Idaho State^{†}	No. 12	Bobcat Stadium; Bozeman, MT		W 30–28	14,127	
October 8	1:05 p.m.	at Weber State	No. 11	Stewart Stadium; Ogden, UT		W 27–24	7,329	
October 15	7:05 p.m.	at Portland State	No. 9	PGE Park; Portland, OR		L 41–44	10,443	
October 29	12:05 p.m.	Northern Arizona	No. 16	Bobcat Stadium; Bozeman, MT		W 29–22	13,427	
November 5	12:05 p.m.	Sacramento State	No. 12	Bobcat Stadium; Bozeman, MT		W 37–16	12,207	
November 12	3:05 p.m.	at No. 21 Eastern Washington	No. 11	Woodward Field; Cheney, WA		L 14–35	8,399	
November 19	12:05 p.m.	No. 3 Montana	No. 22	Bobcat Stadium; Bozeman, MT (rivalry)	KPAX	W 16–6	15,327	
*Non-conference game; ^{†}Homecoming; Rankings from The Sports Network Poll released prior to the game; All times are in Mountain time
