= 2005 Portland State Vikings football team =

American college football season

2005 Portland State Vikings football
- Conference: Big Sky Conference
- Record: 6–5 (4–3 Big Sky)
- Head coach: Tim Walsh (13th season)
- Home stadium: PGE Park

2005 Big Sky Conference football standings
	Conf.			Overall
Team	W		L	W		L
No. 13 Eastern Washington $^	5	–	2	7	–	5
No. 12 Montana ^	5	–	2	8	–	4
No. 18 Montana State	5	–	2	7	–	4
Portland State	4	–	3	6	–	5
Weber State	4	–	3	6	–	5
Idaho State	3	–	4	5	–	6
Sacramento State	1	–	6	2	–	9
Northern Arizona	1	–	6	3	–	8
$ – Conference champion; ^ – NCAA Division I-AA playoff participant; Rankings from The Sports Network poll

The 2005 Portland State Vikings football team was an American football team that represented Portland State University during the 2005 NCAA Division I-AA football season as a member of the Big Sky Conference. In their 13th year under head coach Tim Walsh, the team compiled an 6–5 record, with a mark of 4–3 in conference play, and finished tied for fourth in the Big Sky. The Vikings played their home games at PGE Park in Portland, Oregon.

== Schedule ==
Date	Opponent	Rank	Site	Result	Attendance	Source
September 3	at Oregon State*		Reser Stadium; Corvallis, OR	L 14–41	42,263	
September 10	at UC Davis*		Toomey Field; Davis, CA	W 14–12	5,840	
September 17	Sacramento State		PGE Park; Portland, OR	W 28–12	4,617	
September 24	Northern Colorado*		PGE Park; Portland, OR	W 41–17	5,371	
October 1	at No. 14 Eastern Washington		Woodward Field; Cheney, WA (rivalry)	L 24–42		
October 8	at Boise State*		Bronco Stadium; Boise, ID	L 14–21	30,603	
October 15	No. 9 Montana State		PGE Park; Portland, OR	W 44–41	10,443	
October 22	Northern Arizona	No. 25	PGE Park; Portland, OR	W 45–0		
October 29	at No. 5 Montana	No. 20	Washington–Grizzly Stadium; Missoula, MT	L 16–37	23,605	
November 5	at Idaho State		Holt Arena; Pocatello, ID	L 34–36	7,874	
November 12	Weber State		PGE Park; Portland, OR	W 39–14	5,310	
*Non-conference game; Rankings from The Sports Network Poll released prior to the game
