= 2005 Cal Poly Mustangs football team =

American college football season

2005 Cal Poly Mustangs football

GWC co-champion

NCAA Division I-AA Quarterfinal, L 7–14 at Texas State
- Conference: Great West Conference

Ranking
- Sports Network: No. 6
- Record: 9–4 (4–1 GWC)
- Head coach: Rich Ellerson (5th season)
- Offensive coordinator: Ian Shields (2nd season)
- Co-offensive coordinator: Joe DuPaix (2nd season)
- Offensive scheme: Triple option
- Base defense: 4–3
- Home stadium: Mustang Stadium

2005 Great West Conference football standings
	Conf.			Overall
Team	W		L	W		L
No. 6 Cal Poly +^	4	–	1	9	–	4
UC Davis +	4	–	1	6	–	5
North Dakota State	3	–	2	7	–	4
South Dakota State	3	–	2	6	–	5
Southern Utah	1	–	4	1	–	9
Northern Colorado	0	–	5	4	–	7
+ – Conference co-champions; ^ – NCAA Division I-AA playoff participant; Rankings from The Sports Network poll

The 2005 Cal Poly Mustangs football team represented California Polytechnic State University, San Luis Obispo as member of the Great West Conference (GWC) during the 2005 NCAA Division I-AA football season. Led by fifth-year head coach Rich Ellerson, Cal Poly compiled an overall record of 9–4 with a mark of 4–1 in conference play, sharing the GWC title with UC Davis. The Mustangs advanced to the NCAA Division I-AA Football Championship playoffs, where they defeated Montana in the first round before losing to Texas State in the quarterfinals. The team outscored its opponents 354 to 232 for the season. Cal Poly played home games at Mustang Stadium in San Luis Obispo, California.

== Schedule ==
Date	Time	Opponent	Rank	Site	TV	Result	Attendance	Source
September 3	4:00 p.m.	at Troy*	No. 17	Movie Gallery Stadium; Troy, AL		L 10–27	18,536	
September 10	6:00 p.m.	Sacramento State*	No. 19	Mustang Stadium; San Luis Obispo, CA		W 37–13	6,786	
September 17	6:05 p.m.	No. 11 Montana State*	No. 18	Mustang Stadium; San Luis Obispo, CA		W 38–10	8,043	
September 24	5:00 p.m.	at South Dakota State	No. 12	Coughlin–Alumni Stadium; Brookings, SD		W 24–16	10,633	
October 1		at Northern Colorado	No. 10	Nottingham Field; Greeley CO		W 31–14	9,142	
October 8	4:00 p.m.	No. 12 North Dakota State	No. 6	Mustang Stadium; San Luis Obispo, CA		W 37–6	6,923	
October 22	12:05 p.m.	at No. 9 Montana*	No. 3	Washington–Grizzly Stadium; Missoula, MT	KPAX	L 27–36	23,565	
October 29	1:00 p.m.	at UC Davis	No. 10	Toomey Field; Davis, CA (Battle for the Golden Horseshoe)		L 13–20	7,890	
November 5		No. 11 Eastern Washington*	No. 18	Mustang Stadium; San Luis Obispo, CA		W 40–35	7,901	
November 12	6:00 p.m.	Southern Utah	No. 15	Mustang Stadium; San Luis Obispo, CA		W 20–10	5,763	
November 19	6:00 p.m.	Idaho State*	No. 13	Mustang Stadium; San Luis Obispo, CA		W 35–10	6,339	
November 26	11:00 a.m.	at No. 9 Montana*	No. 10	Washington–Grizzly Stadium; Missoula, MT (NCAA Division I-AA First Round)	KPAX	W 35–21	16,162	
December 3	1:00 p.m.	at No. 4 Texas State*	No. 10	Bobcat Stadium; San Marcos, TX (NCAA Division I-AA Quarterfinal)		L 7–14	15,411	
*Non-conference game; Rankings from The Sports Network Poll released prior to the game; All times are in Pacific time

== Team players in the NFL ==
The following Cal Poly Mustang players were selected in the 2006 NFL draft.

Player	Position	Round	Overall	NFL team
Chris Gocong	Defensive end	3	71	Philadelphia Eagles
