= 2005 Montana Grizzlies football team =

American college football season

2005 Montana Grizzlies football

Big Sky co-champion

NCAA Division I-AA First Round, L 21–35 vs. Cal Poly
- Conference: Big Sky Conference

Ranking
- Sports Network: No. 12
- Record: 8–4 (5–2 Big Sky)
- Head coach: Bobby Hauck (3rd season)
- Offensive coordinator: Rob Phenicie (3rd season)
- Defensive coordinator: Kraig Paulson (2nd season)
- Home stadium: Washington–Grizzly Stadium

2005 Big Sky Conference football standings
	Conf.			Overall
Team	W		L	W		L
No. 13 Eastern Washington +^	5	–	2	7	–	5
No. 12 Montana +^	5	–	2	8	–	4
No. 18 Montana State +	5	–	2	7	–	4
Portland State	4	–	3	6	–	5
Weber State	4	–	3	6	–	5
Idaho State	3	–	4	5	–	6
Sacramento State	1	–	6	2	–	9
Northern Arizona	1	–	6	3	–	8
+ – Conference co-champions; ^ – NCAA Division I-AA playoff participant; Rankings from The Sports Network poll

The 2005 Montana Grizzlies football team represented the University of Montana as a member of the Big Sky Conference during the 2005 NCAA Division I-AA football season. Led by third-year head coach Bobby Hauck, the Grizzlies compiled an overall record of 8–4, with a mark of 5–2 in conference play, and finished as Big Sky co-champion. Montana advanced to the NCAA Division I-AA Football Championship playoffs, where the Grizzlies lost to Cal Poly in the first round. The team played home games at Washington–Grizzly Stadium in Missoula, Montana.

== Schedule ==
Date	Time	Opponent	Rank	Site	TV	Result	Attendance	Source
September 3	1:00 pm	Fort Lewis*	No. 3	Washington–Grizzly Stadium; Missoula, MT	KPAX	W 55–0	23,432	
September 10	1:30 pm	at Oregon*	No. 3	Autzen Stadium; Eugene, OR		L 14–47	58,169	
September 17	1:05 pm	South Dakota State*	No. 4	Washington–Grizzly Stadium; Missoula, MT	KPAX	W 7–0	23,086	
October 1	1:05 pm	Weber State^{†}	No. 4	Washington–Grizzly Stadium; Missoula, MT	KPAX	W 24–19	23,773	
October 8	3:05 pm	at No. 25 Idaho State	No. 4	Holt Arena; Pocatello, ID	KPAX	W 32–10	10,273	
October 15	1:05 pm	No. 12 Eastern Washington	No. 2	Washington–Grizzly Stadium; Missoula, MT (EWU–UM Governors Cup)	KPAX	L 20–34	23,732	
October 22	1:05 pm	No. 3 Cal Poly*	No. 9	Washington–Grizzly Stadium; Missoula, MT	KPAX	W 36–27	23,565	
October 29	1:05 pm	No. 20 Portland State	No. 5	Washington–Grizzly Stadium; Missoula, MT	KPAX	W 37–16	23,605	
November 5	3:05 pm	at Northern Arizona	No. 4	Walkup Skydome; Flagstaff, AZ	KPAX	W 23–0	9,109	
November 12	5:05 pm	at Sacramento State	No. 3	Hornet Stadium; Sacramento, CA	KPAX	W 31–14	4,243	
November 19	12:00 pm	at No. 22 Montana State	No. 3	Bobcat Stadium; Bozeman, MT (rivalry)	KPAX	L 6–16	15,327	
November 26	12:00 pm	No. 10 Cal Poly*	No. 9	Washington–Grizzly Stadium; Missoula, MT (NCAA Division I-AA First Round)	KPAX	L 21–35	16,162	
*Non-conference game; ^{†}Homecoming; Rankings from The Sports Network Poll released prior to the game; All times are in Mountain time
