= 2005 North Dakota State Bison football team =

American college football season

2005 North Dakota State Bison football
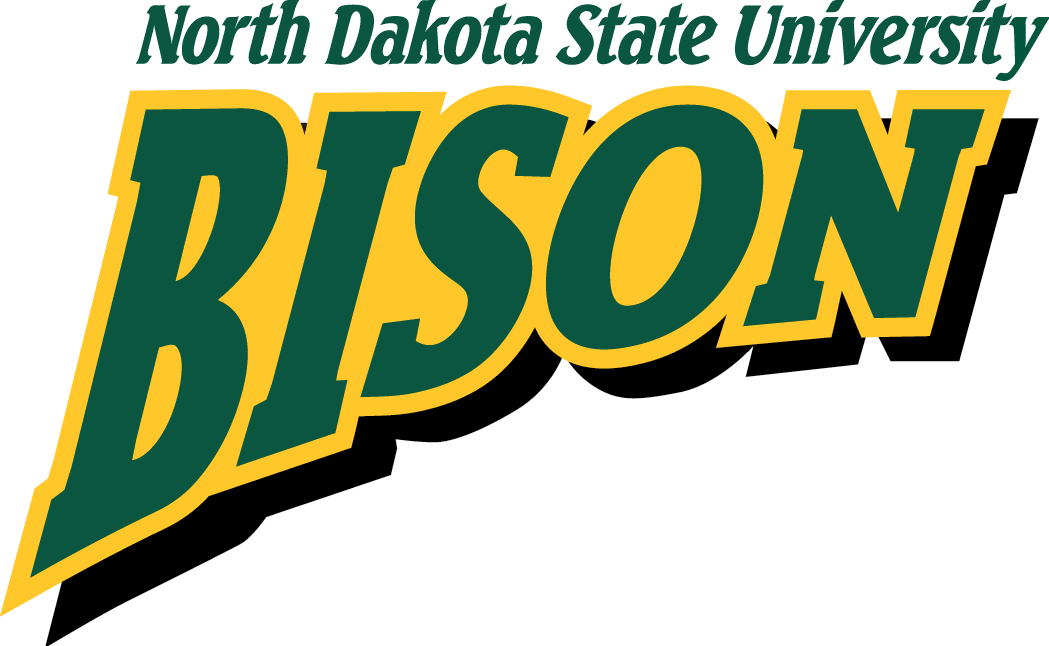
- Conference: Great West Conference
- Record: 7–4 (3–2 GWC)
- Head coach: Craig Bohl (3rd season)
- Offensive coordinator: Patrick Perles (1st season)
- Offensive scheme: Pro-style
- Defensive coordinator: Willie Mack Garza (1st season)
- Base defense: 4–3
- Home stadium: Fargodome

2005 Great West Conference football standings
	Conf.			Overall
Team	W		L	W		L
No. 6 Cal Poly +^	4	–	1	9	–	4
UC Davis +	4	–	1	6	–	5
North Dakota State	3	–	2	7	–	4
South Dakota State	3	–	2	6	–	5
Southern Utah	1	–	4	1	–	9
Northern Colorado	0	–	5	4	–	7
+ – Conference co-champions; ^ – NCAA Division I-AA playoff participant; Rankings from The Sports Network poll

The 2005 North Dakota State Bison football team represented North Dakota State University in the 2005 NCAA Division I-AA football season. The team was led by third-year head coach Craig Bohl and played their homes game at the Fargodome in Fargo, North Dakota. The Bison finished the season with an overall record of 7–4 and tied for second place in the Great West Conference with a mark of 3–2. Despite being ranked #20 at the end of the year, North Dakota State was ineligible for the NCAA Division I-AA playoffs per NCAA rules that mandated a four-year probationary period for programs entering NCAA Division I-AA. The Bison were ranked in the top-25 in 10 of the 11 weeks in the season.

== Schedule ==
Date	Time	Opponent	Rank	Site	Result	Attendance	Source
September 1	7:00 pm	Arkansas–Monticello*	No. 22	Fargodome; Fargo, ND	W 59–7	13,793	
September 10	6:00 pm	at No. 9 Northwestern State*	No. 20	Harry Turpin Stadium; Natchitoches, LA	W 35–7	13,252	
September 17	6:00 pm	Weber State*	No. 12	Fargodome; Fargo, ND	W 41–0	14,368	
September 24	1:00 pm	at No. 18 Montana State*	No. 8	Bobcat Stadium; Bozeman, MT	L 17–20	13,327	
October 1	6:00 pm	Nicholls State*	No. 13	Fargodome; Fargo, ND (Trees Bowl)	W 26–13	14,022	
October 8	6:00 pm	at No. 9 Cal Poly	No. 12	Mustang Stadium; San Luis Obispo, CA	L 6–37	6,923	
October 22	1:00 pm	UC Davis^{†}	No. 17	Fargodome; Fargo, ND	L 14–20	16,193	
October 29	6:00 pm	at Southern Utah		Eccles Coliseum; Cedar City, UT	W 37–21	1,621	
November 5	1:00 pm	at Northern Colorado	No. 24	Fargodome; Fargo, ND (Harvest Bowl)	W 44–0	10,809	
November 12	6:00 pm	South Dakota State	No. 22	Fargodome; Fargo, ND (Dakota Marker)	W 41–17	15,777	
November 19	3:00 pm	No. 11 Southern Illinois	No. 20	McAndrew Stadium; Carbondale, IL	L 0–9	5,809	
*Non-conference game; ^{†}Homecoming; Rankings from The Sports Network Poll released prior to the game; All times are in Central time
