= 2005 Samford Bulldogs football team =

American college football season

2005 Samford Bulldogs football
- Conference: Ohio Valley Conference
- Record: 5–6 (4–4 OVC)
- Head coach: Bill Gray (5th season)
- Offensive coordinator: Bill Gray (5th season)
- Defensive coordinator: Mike O'Toole (6th season)
- Home stadium: Seibert Stadium

2005 Ohio Valley Conference football standings
	Conf.			Overall
Team	W		L	W		L
No. 16 Eastern Illinois $^	8	–	0	9	–	3
Eastern Kentucky	7	–	1	7	–	4
Jacksonville State	6	–	2	6	–	5
Tennessee–Martin	4	–	4	6	–	5
Samford	4	–	4	5	–	6
Tennessee Tech	3	–	5	4	–	7
Southeast Missouri State	2	–	6	2	–	9
Tennessee State	1	–	6	2	–	9
Murray State	0	–	7	2	–	9
$ – Conference champion; ^ – NCAA Division I-AA playoff participant; Rankings from The Sports Network poll

The 2005 Samford Bulldogs football team represented Samford University as a member of the Ohio Valley Conference (OVC) during the 2005 NCAA Division I-AA football season. Led by fifth-year head coach Bill Gray, the Bulldogs compiled an overall record of 5–6, with a mark of 4–4 in conference play, and finished tied for fourth in the OVC. The team played home games at Seibert Stadium in Homewood, Alabama.

== Schedule ==
Date	Time	Opponent	Site	Result	Attendance	Source
September 1	7:00 p.m.	Edward Waters*	Seibert Stadium; Homewood, AL	W 60–7	4,312	
September 10	6:00 p.m.	at Baylor*	Floyd Casey Stadium; Waco, TX	L 14–48	36,575	
September 17	6:00 p.m.	at No. 10 Furman*	Paladin Stadium; Greenville, SC	L 23–45	13,452	
September 24	1:30 p.m.	at Eastern Illinois	O'Brien Stadium; Charleston, IL	L 14–43	9,757	
September 29	6:30 p.m.	Southeast Missouri State	Seibert Stadium; Homewood, AL	W 33–17	5,185	
October 8	5:30 p.m.	at Eastern Kentucky	Roy Kidd Stadium; Richmond, KY	L 6–38	6,100	
October 15	1:00 p.m.	Murray State	Seibert Stadium; Homewood, AL	W 27–23	4,276	
October 22	12:00 p.m.	at Tennessee–Martin	Graham Stadium; Martin, TN	W 30–22	2,132	
October 29	1:30 p.m.	Tennessee State^{†}	Seibert Stadium; Homewood, AL	W 31–11	8,278	
November 5	1:30 p.m.	at Tennessee Tech	Tucker Stadium; Cookeville, TN	L 21–42	7,828	
November 12	12:00 p.m.	Jacksonville State	Seibert Stadium; Homewood, AL (rivalry)	L 20–26	7,643	
*Non-conference game; ^{†}Homecoming; Rankings from The Sports Network Poll released prior to the game; All times are in Central time
