= Kevin McMahan =

American football player (born 1983)

No. 5
- Position: Wide receiver

Personal information
- Born: March 2, 1983 (age 43); Rochester, New York, U.S.
- Listed height: 6 ft 2 in (1.88 m)
- Listed weight: 192 lb (87 kg)

Career information
- High school: Aquinas Institute (Rochester, New York)
- College: Maine
- NFL draft: 2006: 7th round, 255th overall pick

Career history
- Oakland Raiders (2006)*; Indianapolis Colts (2007)*; New York Giants (2007)*; Kansas City Chiefs (2007–2008)*; Carolina Panthers (2008)*
- * Offseason or practice squad member only

Kevin Nathaniel McMahan (born March 2, 1983) is an American former football wide receiver. He was selected by the Oakland Raiders with the last pick in the 2006 NFL draft, earning him the title Mr. Irrelevant. He played college football at Maine.

McMahan was also a member of the Indianapolis Colts, New York Giants, Kansas City Chiefs and Carolina Panthers.

== Early life ==
McMahan played high school football at the Aquinas Institute in Rochester, New York. He was named MVP of the State Championship game in 2001.

== College career ==
McMahan attended the University of Maine where he played for four seasons, the last two as a starter. He was named to the Atlantic 10 Conference's All-Conference team as a senior after setting school records for receiving TDs in a season and receiving TDs in a single game. McMahan caught the game-winning touchdown against SEC opponent Mississippi State University, marking Maine's only victory against an SEC opponent in school history.

McMahan's draft stock rose quickly after a strong senior season and posting impressive numbers in the 40 yard dash and vertical jump. Second in the nation, only to Sinorice Moss, McMahan ran an official 40 yard dash of 4.31 seconds. His vertical of 40 inches also ranked in the top 3 in the nation.

== Professional career ==
=== Oakland Raiders ===
In the 2006 NFL draft, McMahan was taken with the last pick (255th overall), earning him the notable title "Mr. Irrelevant". McMahan went on to compete for a job with a deep wide receiver corps that consisted of Randy Moss and Jerry Porter. McMahan was cut after the last preseason game.

=== New York Giants ===
In 2007, McMahan was with the New York Giants. He led all Giants receivers in the final 2007 preseason game against the New England Patriots on August 30 with 57 receiving yards. McMahan was released by the Giants a few days later in September 2007. He was added to the practice squad a week later. He remained with the Giants' organization until the beginning of October 2007, when he was released.

=== Kansas City Chiefs ===
One week later, the Kansas City Chiefs signed McMahan to their practice squad, but only a week later, McMahan found himself, once again, released. In May 2008, McMahan, once again, signed with the Chiefs. McMahan worked his way up the depth chart and was in contention for a starting role on special teams. During the 2008 preseason, McMahan was leading all chiefs WRs in both receptions, yards and special teams tackles. McMahan again found himself on the practice squad, only to be cut a few weeks later.

He was cut after the Chiefs last pre-season game in 2008.

=== Carolina Panthers ===
McMahan then signed with the Carolina Panthers for the remainder of the season. McMahan was released before the start of the 2009 season in lieu of Dwayne Jarrett.

== Personal life ==
McMahan is married and still resides in Charlotte. He has a bachelor's degree in Accounting and works as an Accountant for a Fortune 500 firm.
