= 2005 Weber State Wildcats football team =

American college football season

2005 Weber State Wildcats football
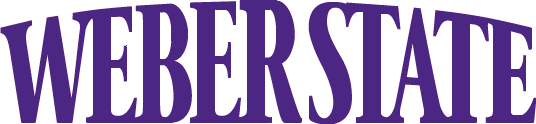
- Conference: Big Sky Conference
- Record: 6–5 (4–3 Big Sky)
- Head coach: Ron McBride (1st season)
- Home stadium: Stewart Stadium

2005 Big Sky Conference football standings
	Conf.			Overall
Team	W		L	W		L
No. 13 Eastern Washington $^	5	–	2	7	–	5
No. 12 Montana ^	5	–	2	8	–	4
No. 18 Montana State	5	–	2	7	–	4
Portland State	4	–	3	6	–	5
Weber State	4	–	3	6	–	5
Idaho State	3	–	4	5	–	6
Sacramento State	1	–	6	2	–	9
Northern Arizona	1	–	6	3	–	8
$ – Conference champion; ^ – NCAA Division I-AA playoff participant; Rankings from The Sports Network poll

The 2005 Weber State Wildcats football team represented Weber State University as a member of the Big Sky Conference during the 2005 NCAA Division I-AA football season. Led by first-year head coach Ron McBride, the Wildcats compiled an overall record of 6–5 with a mark of 4–3 in conference play, tying for fourth place in the Big Sky. The team played home games at Stewart Stadium in Ogden, Utah.

== Schedule ==
Date	Time	Opponent	Site	TV	Result	Attendance	Source
September 3	5:30 pm	Western State (CO)*	Stewart Stadium; Ogden, UT		W 61–0	17,593	
September 10	8:00 pm	at No. 24 (I-A) Fresno State*	Bulldog Stadium; Fresno, CA	ESPNU	L 17–55	38,156	
September 17	5:00 pm	at No. 12 North Dakota State*	Fargodome; Fargo, ND		L 0–41	14,368	
September 24	5:30 pm	Northern Arizona	Stewart Stadium; Ogden, UT		W 31–23	9,145	
October 1	1:05 pm	at No. 4 Montana	Washington–Grizzly Stadium; Missoula, MT	KPAX	L 19–24	23,773	
October 8	1:05 pm	No. 11 Montana State	Stewart Stadium; Ogden, UT		L 24–27	7,329	
October 15	1:00 pm	Sacramento State	Stewart Stadium; Ogden, UT		W 26–14	9,036	
October 22	5:05 pm	at No. 6 Eastern Washington	Woodward Field; Cheney, WA		W 28–23	8,696	
October 29	2:00 pm	Idaho State	Stewart Stadium; Ogden, UT		W 30–21	7,654	
November 12	4:00 pm	at Portland State	PGE Park; Portland, OR		L 14–39	5,310	
November 19	1:00 pm	at Southern Utah*	Eccles Coliseum; Cedar City, UT (Beehive Bowl)		W 27–10	3,072	
*Non-conference game; Rankings from The Sports Network Poll released prior to the game; All times are in Mountain time
