= 2005 Eastern Washington Eagles football team =

American college football season

2005 Eastern Washington Eagles football

Big Sky co-champion

NCAA Division I-AA First Round, L 38–41 at Northern Iowa
- Conference: Big Sky Conference

Ranking
- Sports Network: No. 13
- Record: 7–5 (5–2 Big Sky)
- Head coach: Paul Wulff (6th season)
- Offensive coordinator: Beau Baldwin (3rd season)
- Defensive coordinator: Jody Sears (3rd season)
- Home stadium: Woodward Field

2005 Big Sky Conference football standings
	Conf.			Overall
Team	W		L	W		L
No. 13 Eastern Washington +^	5	–	2	7	–	5
No. 12 Montana +^	5	–	2	8	–	4
No. 18 Montana State +	5	–	2	7	–	4
Portland State	4	–	3	6	–	5
Weber State	4	–	3	6	–	5
Idaho State	3	–	4	5	–	6
Sacramento State	1	–	6	2	–	9
Northern Arizona	1	–	6	3	–	8
+ – Conference co-champions; ^ – NCAA Division I-AA playoff participant; Rankings from The Sports Network poll

The 2005 Eastern Washington Eagles football team represented Eastern Washington University as a member of the Big Sky Conference during the 2005 NCAA Division I-AA football season. Led by sixth-year head coach Paul Wulff, the Eagles compiled an overall record of 7–5, with a mark of 5–2 in conference play, and finished as Big Sky co-champion. Eastern Washington advanced to the NCAA Division I-AA Football Championship playoffs, where the Eagles lost to Northern Iowa in the first round. The team played home games at Woodward Field in Cheney, Washington.

== Schedule ==
Date	Time	Opponent	Rank	Site	Result	Attendance	Source
September 3	3:00 p.m.	at San Jose State*	No. 4	Spartan Stadium; San Jose, CA	L 24–35	11,878	
September 17		Western Oregon*	No. 5	Woodward Field; Cheney, WA	W 48–7	7,110	
September 24		at Idaho State	No. 5	Holt Arena; Pocatello, ID	L 30–34		
October 1		Portland State	No. 14	Woodward Field; Cheney, WA (rivalry)	W 42–24		
October 8		at Northern Arizona	No. 15	Walkup Skydome; Flagstaff, AZ	W 42–14	8,974	
October 15	12:05 p.m.	at No. 2 Montana	No. 12	Washington–Grizzly Stadium; Missoula, MT (EWU–UM Governors Cup)	W 34–20	23,732	
October 22	4:05 p.m.	Weber State	No. 6	Woodward Field; Cheney, WA	L 23–28	8,696	
October 29		at Sacramento State	No. 14	Hornet Stadium; Sacramento, CA	W 45–17	3,102	
November 5		at No. 18 Cal Poly*	No. 11	Mustang Stadium; San Luis Obispo, CA	L 35–40	7,901	
November 12	2:05 p.m.	No. 11 Montana State	No. 21	Woodward Field; Cheney, WA	W 35–14	8,399	
November 19	2:05 p.m.	UC Davis*	No. 19	Woodward Field; Cheney, WA	W 24–7	5,344	
November 26	5:05 p.m.	at No. 7 Northern Iowa*	No. 15	UNI-Dome; Cedar Falls, IA (NCAA Division I-AA First Round)	L 38–41	7,746	
*Non-conference game; Rankings from The Sports Network Poll released prior to the game; All times are in Pacific time
