= 2005 Eastern Illinois Panthers football team =

American college football season

2005 Eastern Illinois Panthers football

OVC champion

NCAA Division I-AA First Round, L 6–21 vs. Southern Illinois
- Conference: Ohio Valley Conference

Ranking
- Sports Network: No. 16
- Record: 9–3 (8–0 OVC)
- Head coach: Bob Spoo (19th season)
- Defensive coordinator: Roc Bellantoni (4th season)
- Home stadium: O'Brien Stadium

2005 Ohio Valley Conference football standings
| | Conf. | | | Overall |
| Team | W | | L | W | | L |
|---|---|---|---|---|---|---|
| No. 16 Eastern Illinois $^ | 8 | – | 0 | 9 | – | 3 |
| Eastern Kentucky | 7 | – | 1 | 7 | – | 4 |
| Jacksonville State | 6 | – | 2 | 6 | – | 5 |
| Tennessee–Martin | 4 | – | 4 | 6 | – | 5 |
| Samford | 4 | – | 4 | 5 | – | 6 |
| Tennessee Tech | 3 | – | 5 | 4 | – | 7 |
| Southeast Missouri State | 2 | – | 6 | 2 | – | 9 |
| Tennessee State | 1 | – | 6 | 2 | – | 9 |
| Murray State | 0 | – | 7 | 2 | – | 9 |
$ – Conference champion; ^ – NCAA Division I-AA playoff participant; Rankings from The Sports Network poll

The 2005 Eastern Illinois Panthers football team represented Eastern Illinois University as a member of the Ohio Valley Conference (OVC) during the 2005 NCAA Division I-AA football season. Led by 19th-year head coach Bob Spoo, the Panthers compiled an overall record of 9–3 with a mark of 8–0 in conference play, winning the OVC title. Eastern Illinois was invited to the NCAA Division I-AA Football Championship playoffs, where they lost Southern Illinois in the first round.

== Schedule ==
| Date | Time | Opponent | Rank | Site | TV | Result | Attendance | Source |
|---|---|---|---|---|---|---|---|---|
| September 1 | 6:00 p.m. | at Indiana State* | | Memorial Stadium; Terre Haute, IN | | W 24–13 | 4,525 | |
| September 10 | 2:00 p.m. | at BYU* | | LaVell Edwards Stadium; Provo, UT | SWP | L 10–45 | 52,630 | |
| September 17 | 6:00 p.m. | Illinois State* | | O'Brien Stadium; Charleston, IL (rivalry) | | L 6–27 | 6,785 | |
| September 24 | 1:30 p.m. | Samford | | O'Brien Stadium; Charleston, IL | | W 43–14 | 9,757 | |
| October 8 | 6:00 p.m. | at Southeast Missouri State | | Houck Stadium; Cape Girardeau, MO | | W 48–24 | 4,275 | |
| October 15 | 1:30 p.m. | Eastern Kentucky | | O'Brien Stadium; Charleston, IL | | W 52–22 | 8,732 | |
| October 22 | 2:00 p.m. | at Murray State | | Roy Stewart Stadium; Murray, KY | | W 35–28 | 5,305 | |
| October 29 | 6:00 p.m. | Tennessee–Martin | | O'Brien Stadium; Charleston, IL | | W 26–7 | 3,412 | |
| November 5 | 6:00 p.m. | at Tennessee State | No. 25 | The Coliseum; Nashville, TN | | W 27–3 | 23,481 | |
| November 12 | 1:30 p.m. | Tennessee Tech | No. 23 | O'Brien Stadium; Charleston, IL | | W 31–20 | 5,512 | |
| November 19 | 1:00 p.m. | at Jacksonville State | No. 21 | Burgess-Snow Field; Jacksonville, AL | | W 10–6 | 7,058 | |
| November 26 | 1:00 p.m. | at No. 8 Southern Illinois* | No. 19 | O'Brien Stadium; Charleston, IL (NCAA Division I-AA First Round) | | L 6–21 | 2,896 | |
*Non-conference game; Rankings from The Sports Network Poll released prior to the game; All times are in Central time

== Roster ==
2005 Eastern Illinois Panthers football team roster
| Players | | | Coaches |
|---|---|---|---|
| Offense: Pos. / # / Name / Class; QB / 10 / Mike Donato / So | Defense: Pos. / # / Name / Class; DE / 91 / Pierre Walters / Fr | Special teams: Pos. / # / Name / Class; P / 33 / Tom Schofield / Sr | Head coach: Bob Spoo; Coordinators/assistant coaches Legend: (C) Team captain; (S) Suspended; (I) Ineligible; Injured; Redshirt; Roster |
