= 2005 Jacksonville State Gamecocks football team =

American college football season

2005 Jacksonville State Gamecocks football
- Conference: Ohio Valley Conference
- Record: 6–5 (6–2 OVC)
- Head coach: Jack Crowe (6th season)
- Offensive coordinator: Ronnie Letson (2nd season)
- Defensive coordinator: Greg Stewart (6th season)
- Home stadium: Paul Snow Stadium

2005 Ohio Valley Conference football standings
	Conf.			Overall
Team	W		L	W		L
No. 16 Eastern Illinois $^	8	–	0	9	–	3
Eastern Kentucky	7	–	1	7	–	4
Jacksonville State	6	–	2	6	–	5
Tennessee–Martin	4	–	4	6	–	5
Samford	4	–	4	5	–	6
Tennessee Tech	3	–	5	4	–	7
Southeast Missouri State	2	–	6	2	–	9
Tennessee State	1	–	6	2	–	9
Murray State	0	–	7	2	–	9
$ – Conference champion; ^ – NCAA Division I-AA playoff participant; Rankings from The Sports Network poll

The 2005 Jacksonville State Gamecocks football team represented Jacksonville State University as a member of the Ohio Valley Conference (OVC) during the 2005 NCAA Division I-AA football season. Led by Sixth-year head coach Jack Crowe, the Gamecocks compiled an overall record of 6–5 with a mark of 6–2 in conference play, finishing third in the OVC. Jacksonville State played home games at Paul Snow Stadium in Jacksonville, Alabama.

== Schedule ==
Date	Time	Opponent	Rank	Site	Result	Attendance	Source
September 1	7:00 p.m.	No. 2 Furman*	No. 20	Paul Snow Stadium; Jacksonville, AL	L 35–37	13,982	
September 10	6:00 p.m.	Chattanooga*	No. 21	Paul Snow Stadium; Jacksonville, AL	L 18–21	12,862	
September 17	6:00 p.m.	at UAB*		Legion Field; Birmingham, AL	L 28–35	23,109	
September 24	6:00 p.m.	at Southeast Missouri State		Houck Stadium; Cape Girardeau, MO	W 24–10	7,850	
October 1	6:00 p.m.	Eastern Kentucky		Paul Snow Stadium; Jacksonville, AL	L 14–31	8,751	
October 8	6:00 p.m.	at Murray State		Roy Stewart Stadium; Murray, KY	W 28–23	3,275	
October 15	4:00 p.m.	Tennessee–Martin		Paul Snow Stadium; Jacksonville, AL	W 37–17	12,919	
October 22	6:00 p.m.	at Tennessee State		The Coliseum; Nashville, TN	W 33–3	6,490	
October 29	4:00 p.m.	Tennessee Tech		Paul Snow Stadium; Jacksonville, AL	W 43–17	12,762	
November 12	12:00 p.m.	at Samford		Seibert Stadium; Homewood, AL (rivalry)	W 26–20	7,643	
November 19	1:00 p.m.	No. 21 Eastern Illinois		Paul Snow Stadium; Jacksonville, AL	L 6–10	7,058	
*Non-conference game; Rankings from The Sports Network Poll released prior to the game; All times are in Central time
