= 2005 UC Davis Aggies football team =

American college football season

2005 UC Davis Aggies football

GWC co-champion
- Conference: Great West Conference
- Record: 6–5 (4–1 GWC)
- Head coach: Bob Biggs (13th season)
- Offensive coordinator: Mike Moroski (13th season)
- Home stadium: Toomey Field

2005 Great West Conference football standings
| | Conf. | | | Overall |
| Team | W | | L | W | | L |
|---|---|---|---|---|---|---|
| No. 6 Cal Poly +^ | 4 | – | 1 | 9 | – | 4 |
| UC Davis + | 4 | – | 1 | 6 | – | 5 |
| North Dakota State | 3 | – | 2 | 7 | – | 4 |
| South Dakota State | 3 | – | 2 | 6 | – | 5 |
| Southern Utah | 1 | – | 4 | 1 | – | 9 |
| Northern Colorado | 0 | – | 5 | 4 | – | 7 |
+ – Conference co-champions; ^ – NCAA Division I-AA playoff participant; Rankings from The Sports Network poll

The 2005 UC Davis football team represented the University of California, Davis as a member of the Great West Conference (GWC) during the 2005 NCAA Division I-AA football season. Led by 13th-year head coach Bob Biggs, UC Davis compiled an overall record of 6–5 with a mark of 4–1 in conference play, sharing the GWC title with Cal Poly. 2005 was the 36th consecutive winning season for the Aggies. The team outscored their opponents 217 to 184 for the season. The Aggies played home games at Toomey Field in Davis, California.

== Schedule ==
| Date | Time | Opponent | Rank | Site | Result | Attendance | Source |
|---|---|---|---|---|---|---|---|
| September 3 | 6:00 p.m. | No. 7 New Hampshire* | | Toomey Field; Davis, CA | L 13–17 | 6,375 | |
| September 10 | 6:00 p.m. | Portland State* | | Toomey Field; Davis, CA | L 12–14 | 5,840 | |
| September 17 | 7:00 p.m. | at Stanford* | | Stanford Stadium; Stanford, CA | W 20–17 | 31,250 | |
| September 24 | 2:05 p.m. | at Sacramento State* | | Hornet Stadium; Sacramento, CA (Causeway Classic) | W 37–7 | 10,187 | |
| October 8 | 11:00 a.m. | at South Dakota State | | Coughlin–Alumni Stadium; Brookings, SD | L 14–16 | 7,239 | |
| October 15 | 6:00 p.m. | Southern Utah | | Toomey Field; Davis, CA | W 33–21 | 6,365 | |
| October 22 | 11:00 a.m. | at No. 17 North Dakota State | | Fargodome; Fargo, ND | W 20–14 | 16,193 | |
| October 29 | 1:00 p.m. | No. 10 Cal Poly^{†} | | Toomey Field; Davis, CA (Battle for the Golden Horseshoe) | W 20–13 | 7,890 | |
| November 5 | 2:00 p.m. | at Stephen F. Austin* | No. 21 | Homer Bryce Stadium; Nacogdoches, TX | L 17–27 | 6,549 | |
| November 19 | 2:05 p.m. | at No. 19 Eastern Washington* | | Woodward Field; Cheney, WA | L 7–24 | 5,344 | |
| November 26 | 1:00 p.m. | Northern Colorado | | Toomey Field; Davis, CA | W 24–14 | 5,215 | |
*Non-conference game; ^{†}Homecoming; Rankings from The Sports Network Poll released prior to the game; All times are in Pacific time
