= 2005 NCAA Division I-AA football season =

American college football season

2005 NCAA Division I-AA season
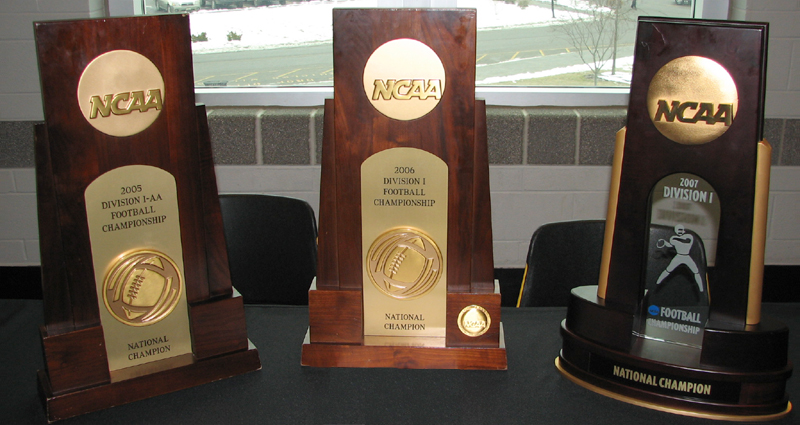
- 2005 I-AA National Championship trophy (left).

Regular season
- Number of teams: 120
- Duration: September 1 – November 25
- Payton Award: Erik Meyer
- Buchanan Award: Chris Gocong

Playoff
- Duration: November 26 – December 16
- Championship date: December 16, 2005
- Championship site: Finley Stadium; Chattanooga, Tennessee
- Champion: Appalachian State

NCAA Division I-AA football seasons
- «2004 2006»

The 2005 NCAA Division I-AA football season, the 2005 season of college football for teams in Division I-AA, began on September 1, 2005, and concluded on December 16, 2005. In the 2005 NCAA Division I-AA Football Championship Game, played in Chattanooga, Tennessee, the Appalachian State Mountaineers defeated the Northern Iowa Panthers.

== Conference changes and new programs ==
School	2004 Conference	2005 Conference
Florida Atlantic	I-AA Independent	Sun Belt (I-A)
FIU	I-AA Independent	Sun Belt (I-A)
Southeastern Louisiana	I-AA Independent	Southland

== I-AA team wins over I-A teams ==
- September 1 – Northwestern State 27, Louisiana–Monroe 23
- September 17 – UC Davis 20, Stanford 17

== Conference standings ==
2005 Atlantic 10 Conference football standings
	Conf.			Overall
Team	W		L	W		L
North Division
No. 5 New Hampshire x+^	7	–	1	11	–	2
No. 19 UMass	6	–	2	7	–	4
Hofstra	5	–	3	8	–	4
Maine	3	–	5	5	–	6
Northeastern	2	–	6	3	–	9
Rhode Island	2	–	6	4	–	7
South Division
No. 8 Richmond x+^	7	–	1	9	–	4
No. 25 James Madison	5	–	3	7	–	4
Delaware	3	–	5	6	–	5
Towson	3	–	5	6	–	5
William & Mary	3	–	5	5	–	6
Villanova	2	–	6	4	–	7
+ – Conference co-champions; x – Division champion/co-champions; ^ – NCAA Division I-AA playoff participant; Rankings from The Sports Network poll

2005 Big Sky Conference football standings
	Conf.			Overall
Team	W		L	W		L
No. 13 Eastern Washington +^	5	–	2	7	–	5
No. 12 Montana +^	5	–	2	8	–	4
No. 18 Montana State +	5	–	2	7	–	4
Portland State	4	–	3	6	–	5
Weber State	4	–	3	6	–	5
Idaho State	3	–	4	5	–	6
Sacramento State	1	–	6	2	–	9
Northern Arizona	1	–	6	3	–	8
+ – Conference co-champions; ^ – NCAA Division I-AA playoff participant; Rankings from The Sports Network poll

2005 Big South Conference football standings
	Conf.			Overall
Team	W		L	W		L
No. 24 Coastal Carolina +	3	–	1	9	–	2
Charleston Southern +	3	–	1	7	–	4
Gardner–Webb	2	–	2	5	–	6
VMI	2	–	2	3	–	8
Liberty	0	–	4	1	–	10
+ – Conference co-champions; Rankings from The Sports Network poll

2005 Gateway Football Conference standings
	Conf.			Overall
Team	W		L	W		L
No. 2 Northern Iowa +^	5	–	2	11	–	4
No. 7 Southern Illinois +^	5	–	2	9	–	4
No. 14 Youngstown State +	5	–	2	8	–	3
No. 22 Illinois State	4	–	3	7	–	4
Western Kentucky	4	–	3	6	–	5
Western Illinois	3	–	4	5	–	6
Missouri State	2	–	5	4	–	6
Indiana State	0	–	7	0	–	11
+ – Conference co-champions; ^ – NCAA Division I-AA playoff participant; Rankings from The Sports Network poll

2005 Great West Conference football standings
	Conf.			Overall
Team	W		L	W		L
No. 6 Cal Poly +^	4	–	1	9	–	4
UC Davis +	4	–	1	6	–	5
North Dakota State	3	–	2	7	–	4
South Dakota State	3	–	2	6	–	5
Southern Utah	1	–	4	1	–	9
Northern Colorado	0	–	5	4	–	7
+ – Conference co-champions; ^ – NCAA Division I-AA playoff participant; Rankings from The Sports Network poll

2005 Ivy League football standings
	Conf.			Overall
Team	W		L	W		L
No. 15 Brown $	6	–	1	9	–	1
Princeton	5	–	2	7	–	3
Harvard	5	–	2	7	–	3
Yale	4	–	3	4	–	6
Cornell	4	–	3	6	–	4
Penn	3	–	4	5	–	5
Dartmouth	1	–	6	2	–	8
Columbia	0	–	7	2	–	8
$ – Conference champion; Rankings from The Sports Network poll

2005 Metro Atlantic Athletic Conference football standings
	Conf.			Overall
Team	W		L	W		L
Duquesne $	4	–	0	7	–	3
Marist	3	–	1	7	–	4
La Salle	2	–	2	4	–	7
Iona	1	–	3	3	–	7
Saint Peter's	0	–	4	1	–	9
$ – Conference champion

2005 Mid-Eastern Athletic Conference football standings
	Conf.			Overall
Team	W		L	W		L
No. 10 Hampton $^	8	–	0	11	–	1
No. 20 South Carolina State	7	–	1	9	–	2
Delaware State	6	–	2	7	–	4
Florida A&M	5	–	3	6	–	5
Bethune–Cookman	4	–	4	7	–	4
Norfolk State	2	–	6	4	–	7
North Carolina A&T	2	–	6	3	–	8
Howard	1	–	7	4	–	7
Morgan State	1	–	7	2	–	9
$ – Conference champion; ^ – NCAA Division I-AA playoff participant; Rankings from The Sports Network poll

2005 Northeast Conference football standings
	Conf.			Overall
Team	W		L	W		L
Central Connecticut State +	5	–	2	7	–	4
Stony Brook +	5	–	2	6	–	5
Monmouth	4	–	3	6	–	4
Albany	4	–	3	5	–	6
Wagner	3	–	4	6	–	5
Sacred Heart	3	–	4	4	–	6
Saint Francis (PA)	3	–	4	3	–	8
Robert Morris	1	–	6	2	–	8
+ – Conference co-champions

2005 Ohio Valley Conference football standings
	Conf.			Overall
Team	W		L	W		L
No. 16 Eastern Illinois $^	8	–	0	9	–	3
Eastern Kentucky	7	–	1	7	–	4
Jacksonville State	6	–	2	6	–	5
Tennessee–Martin	4	–	4	6	–	5
Samford	4	–	4	5	–	6
Tennessee Tech	3	–	5	4	–	7
Southeast Missouri State	2	–	6	2	–	9
Tennessee State	1	–	6	2	–	9
Murray State	0	–	7	2	–	9
$ – Conference champion; ^ – NCAA Division I-AA playoff participant; Rankings from The Sports Network poll

2005 Patriot League football standings
	Conf.			Overall
Team	W		L	W		L
No. 21 Lafayette +^	5	–	1	8	–	4
No. 23 Colgate +^	5	–	1	8	–	4
Lehigh	4	–	2	8	–	3
Holy Cross	3	–	3	6	–	5
Georgetown	2	–	4	4	–	7
Fordham	2	–	4	2	–	9
Bucknell	0	–	6	1	–	10
+ – Conference co-champions; ^ – NCAA Division I-AA playoff participant; Rankings from The Sports Network poll

2005 Pioneer Football League standings
	Conf.			Overall
Team	W		L	W		L
North Division
San Diego xy$	4	–	0	11	–	1
Dayton	3	–	1	9	–	1
Drake	2	–	2	6	–	4
Valparaiso	1	–	3	3	–	8
Butler	0	–	4	0	–	11
South Division
Morehead State xy	3	–	0	8	–	4
Jacksonville	2	–	1	4	–	4
Davidson	1	–	2	4	–	6
Austin Peay	0	–	3	2	–	9
Championship: San Diego 47, Morehead State 40
$ – Conference champion; x – Division champion/co-champions; y – Championship game participant

2005 Southern Conference football standings
	Conf.			Overall
Team	W		L	W		L
No. 1 Appalachian State $^	6	–	1	12	–	3
No. 3 Furman ^	5	–	2	11	–	3
No. 9 Georgia Southern ^	5	–	2	8	–	4
Western Carolina	4	–	3	5	–	4
Wofford	3	–	4	6	–	5
Chattanooga	3	–	4	6	–	5
The Citadel	2	–	5	4	–	7
Elon	0	–	7	3	–	8
$ – Conference champion; ^ – NCAA Division I-AA playoff participant; Rankings from The Sports Network poll

2005 Southland Conference football standings
	Conf.			Overall
Team	W		L	W		L
No. 4 Texas State +^	5	–	1	11	–	3
No. 17 Nicholls State +^	5	–	1	6	–	4
McNeese State	3	–	3	5	–	4
Northwestern State	3	–	3	5	–	5
Southeastern Louisiana	2	–	4	4	–	6
Sam Houston State	2	–	4	3	–	7
Stephen F. Austin	1	–	5	5	–	6
+ – Conference co-champions; ^ – NCAA Division I-AA playoff participant; Rankings from The Sports Network poll

2005 Southwestern Athletic Conference football standings
	Conf.			Overall
Team	W		L	W		L
East Division
Alabama A&M xy	7	–	2	9	–	3
Alabama State	6	–	3	6	–	5
Mississippi Valley State	5	–	4	6	–	5
Alcorn State	5	–	4	6	–	5
Jackson State	2	–	7	2	–	9
West Division
No. 11 Grambling State xy$	9	–	0	11	–	1
Southern	4	–	5	4	–	5
Prairie View A&M	3	–	6	5	–	6
Arkansas–Pine Bluff	3	–	6	3	–	8
Texas Southern	1	–	8	1	–	10
Championship: Grambling State 45, Alabama A&M 6
$ – Conference champion; x – Division champion/co-champions; y – Championship game participant; Rankings from The Sports Network Poll

2005 NCAA Division I-AA independents football standings
	Conf.			Overall
Team	W		L	W		L
Savannah State		–		0	–	11

== Conference champions ==
=== Automatic berths ===
Conference	Champion
Atlantic 10 Conference	New Hampshire and Richmond
Big Sky Conference	Eastern Washington, Montana, and Montana State
Gateway Football Conference	Northern Iowa, Southern Illinois, and Youngstown State
Mid-Eastern Athletic Conference	Hampton
Ohio Valley Conference	Eastern Illinois
Patriot League	Colgate and Lafayette
Southern Conference	Appalachian State
Southland Conference	Nicholls State and Texas State

=== Invitation ===
Conference	Champion
Big South Conference	Charleston Southern and Coastal Carolina
Great West Football Conference	Cal Poly and UC Davis
Metro Atlantic Athletic Conference	Duquesne
Northeast Conference	Central Connecticut State and Stony Brook
Pioneer Football League	San Diego

=== Abstains ===
Conference	Champion
Ivy League	Brown
Southwestern Athletic Conference	Grambling State

== Postseason ==
=== NCAA Division I-AA playoff bracket ===
First Round
November 26
Campus sites

Quarterfinals
December 3
Campus sites

Semifinals
December 9 and December 10
Campus sites

National Championship Game

December 16
Finley Stadium
Chattanooga, Tennessee

Colgate
21

1
New Hampshire*
55

1
New Hampshire*
21

Northern Iowa
24

Eastern Washington
38

Northern Iowa*
41

Northern Iowa
40

4
Texas State*
37

Georgia Southern
35

4
Texas State*
50

4
Texas State*
14

Cal Poly
7

Cal Poly
35

Montana*
21

6
Northern Iowa*
16

2
Appalachian State
21

Lafayette
23

2
Appalachian State*
34

2
Appalachian State*
38

Southern Illinois
24

Southern Illinois
21

Eastern Illinois*
6

2
Appalachian State*
29

Furman
23

Richmond
38

3
Hampton*
10

Richmond*
20

Furman
24

Nicholls State
12

Furman*
14

* Host institution

=== SWAC Championship Game ===
Date	Location	Venue	West Div. Champion	East Div. Champion	Result
December 10	Birmingham, Alabama	Legion Field	Grambling State	Alabama A&M	Grambling State, 45–6

== Awards and honors ==
=== Walter Payton Award voting ===
The Walter Payton Award is given to the year's most outstanding player

Player	School	Position	1st	2nd	3rd	4th	5th	Total
Erik Meyer	Eastern Washington	QB	33	18	17	16	13	333
Ricky Santos	New Hampshire	QB	31	27	11	13	6	328
Nick Hartigan	Brown	RB	11	16	15	14	13	205
Bruce Eugene	Grambling State	QB	16	12	13	10	10	197
Barrick Nealy	Tennessee State	QB	6	5	10	6	8	100
Richie Williams	Appalachian State	QB	5	6	11	3	11	99
Dave Ball	New Hampshire	WR	1	4	7	17	8	84
Joe Rubin	Portland State	RB	0	5	9	8	7	70
Travis Lulay	Montana State	QB	4	3	4	8	5	65
Laurent Robinson	Illinois State	WR	1	2	6	4	4	43
Jermaine Austin	Georgia Southern	RB	1	5	0	3	7	38
Joel Sambursky	Southern Illinois	QB	1	4	2	4	3	38
Steve Silva	Holy Cross	RB	1	2	4	1	9	36
Ingle Martin	Furman	QB	2	3	1	1	3	30
Omar Cuff	Delaware	RB	0	1	3	3	2	21
Lex Hilliard	Montana	RB	0	0	0	1	2	4
Josh Johnson	San Diego	QB	0	0	0	1	0	2
Eric Kimble	Eastern Washington	WR	0	0	0	0	1	1
Scott Phaydavong	Drake	RB	0	0	0	0	1	1

== Final poll standings ==
Standings are from The Sports Network final 2005 poll.

Rank	Team	Record
1	Appalachian State Mountaineers	12–3
2	Northern Iowa Panthers	11–4
3	Furman Paladins	11–3
4	Texas State Bobcats	11–3
5	New Hampshire Wildcats	11–2
6	Cal Poly Mustangs	9–4
7	Southern Illinois Salukis	9–4
8	Richmond Spiders	9–4
9	Georgia Southern Eagles	8–4
10	Hampton Pirates	11–1
11	Grambling State Tigers	11–1
12	Montana Grizzlies	8–4
13	Eastern Washington Eagles	7–5
14	Youngstown State Penguins	8–3
15	Brown Bears	9–1
16	Eastern Illinois Panthers	9–3
17	Nicholls State Colonels	6–4
18	Montana State Bobcats	7–4
19	Massachusetts Minutemen	7–4
20	South Carolina State Bulldogs	9–2
21	Lafayette Leopards	8–4
22	Illinois State Redbirds	7–4
23	Colgate Raiders	8–4
24	Coastal Carolina Chanticleers	9–2
25	James Madison Dukes	7–4

== Rule changes for 2005 ==
There are several rules that have changed for the 2005 season. Following are some highlights:

- In an effort to bring spearing under control, the word "intentional" was removed from the rules.
- A listing of examples for unsportsmanlike acts was developed in order to encourage more consistent application of the rule. Examples of such acts include, but are not limited to:
  - Imitating a slash of the throat;
  - Resembling the firing of a weapon;
  - Bowing at the waist;
  - Punching one’s own chest excessively;
  - Crossing one’s arms in front of the chest;
  - Placing one’s hand by the ear as if to indicate that the player cannot hear the spectators;
  - Diving into the end zone when unchallenged by an opponent;
  - Entering the end zone with an unnatural stride (e.g., high stepping);
  - Going significantly beyond the end line to interact with spectators;
  - Standing over a prone player in a taunting manner;
  - Attempting to make the ball spin as if it were a top;
  - Performing a choreographed act with a teammate(s) (e.g., pretending to take a photo, falling down in unison); and
  - Entering the field of play by coaches or substitutes in protest of officials' calls.
- Additionally, the committee added language to the rule that reads: "Spontaneous celebrating with teammates on the field of play, provided it is not prolonged, taunting or intended to bring attention to the individual player, is allowed."
