= 2005 Idaho State Bengals football team =

American college football season

2005 Idaho State Bengals football
- Conference: Big Sky Conference
- Record: 5–6 (3–4 Big Sky)
- Head coach: Larry Lewis (7th season)
- Offensive coordinator: Bruce Barnum (5th season)
- Offensive scheme: Pro spread
- Defensive coordinator: James Ward (6th season)
- Base defense: 4–3
- Home stadium: Holt Arena

2005 Big Sky Conference football standings
	Conf.			Overall
Team	W		L	W		L
No. 13 Eastern Washington +^	5	–	2	7	–	5
No. 12 Montana +^	5	–	2	8	–	4
No. 18 Montana State +	5	–	2	7	–	4
Portland State	4	–	3	6	–	5
Weber State	4	–	3	6	–	5
Idaho State	3	–	4	5	–	6
Sacramento State	1	–	6	2	–	9
Northern Arizona	1	–	6	3	–	8
+ – Conference co-champions; ^ – NCAA Division I-AA playoff participant; Rankings from The Sports Network poll

The 2005 Idaho State Bengals football team represented Idaho State University as a member of the Big Sky Conference during the 2005 NCAA Division I-AA football season. Led by seventh-year head coach Larry Lewis, the Bengals compiled an overall record of 5–6, with a mark of 3–4 in conference play, and finished sixth in the Big Sky. The team played home games at Holt Arena in Pocatello, Idaho.

== Schedule ==
Date	Opponent	Rank	Site	Result	Attendance	Source
September 1	Southern Utah*		Holt Arena; Pocatello, ID	W 38–13		
September 10	at Kentucky*		Commonwealth Stadium; Lexington, KY	L 29–41	59,519	
September 17	Montana Western*		Holt Arena; Pocatello, ID	W 37–0		
September 24	No. 5 Eastern Washington		Holt Arena; Pocatello, ID	W 34–30		
October 1	at No. 12 Montana State		Bobcat Stadium; Bozeman, MT	L 28–30	14,127	
October 8	No. 4 Montana	No. 25	Holt Arena; Pocatello, ID	L 10–32	10,273	
October 22	at Sacramento State		Hornet Stadium; Sacramento, CA	W 27–17	4,451	
October 29	at Weber State		Stewart Stadium; Ogden, UT	L 21–30	7,654	
November 5	Portland State		Holt Arena; Pocatello, ID	W 36–34	7,874	
November 12	at Northern Arizona		Walkup Skydome; Flagstaff, AZ	L 28–42	5,020	
November 19	at No. 13 Cal Poly*		Mustang Stadium; San Luis Obispo, CA	L 10–35	6,339	
*Non-conference game; Rankings from The Sports Network Poll released prior to the game
