= 2005 NCAA Division I-AA football rankings =

The 2005 NCAA Division I-AA football rankings are from the Sports Network media poll and the coaches poll.

== Legend ==
	Increase in ranking
	Decrease in ranking
	Not ranked previous week
(#–#)	Win–loss record
(Italics)	Number of first place votes
т	Tied with team above or below also with this symbol

== The Sports Network poll ==
	Preseason	Week 1 Sept 6	Week 2 Sept 13	Week 3 Sept 20	Week 4 Sept 27	Week 5 Oct 4	Week 6 Oct 11	Week 7 Oct 18	Week 8 Oct 25	Week 9 Nov 1	Week 10 Nov 8	Week 11 Nov 15	Week 12 Nov 22	Week 13 Postseason	
1.	James Madison (49)	James Madison (1–0) (75)	Southern Illinois (2–0) (79)	Western Kentucky (2–0) (40)	New Hampshire (3–0) (65)	New Hampshire (4–0) (84)	Southern Illinois (4–1) (58)	Western Kentucky (5–1) (64)	Western Kentucky (6–1) (78)	Furman (7–1) (61)	New Hampshire (8–1) (57)	New Hampshire (9–1) (58)	New Hampshire (10–1) (45)	Appalachian State (12–3) (78)	1.
2.	Furman (21)	Furman (1–0) (19)	Western Kentucky (2–0) (4)	New Hampshire (2–0) (24)	Southern Illinois (2–1) (16)	Southern Illinois (3–1) (15)	Montana (4–1) (17)	Furman (6–1) (11)	Furman (7–1) (13)	New Hampshire (7–1) (25)	Hampton (9–0) (44)	Hampton (10–0) (39)	Hampton (11–0) (29)	Northern Iowa (11–4)	2.
3.	Montana (14)	Montana (1–0) (6)	New Hampshire (1–0) (5)	Southern Illinois (2–1) (31)	Western Kentucky (2–1) (14)	Western Kentucky (3–1) (5)	Western Kentucky (4–1) (11)	Cal Poly (5–1) (21)	Hampton (8–0) (13)	Hampton (8–0) (23)	Montana (7–2) (4)	Montana (8–2) (3)	Furman (9–2)	Furman (11–3)	3.
4.	Eastern Washington (11)	Southern Illinois (1–0) (3)	Montana (1–1) (8)	Montana (2–1) (5)	Montana (2–1) (7)	Montana (3–1) (6)	James Madison (4–1) (5)	Hampton (7–0) (16)	New Hampshire (6–1) (6)	Montana (6–2) (2)	Southern Illinois (7–2)	Furman (8–2)	Texas State (9–2) (1)	Texas State (11–3)	4.
5.	Southern Illinois (3)	Georgia Southern (1–0)	Eastern Washington (0–1) (10)	Eastern Washington (1–1) (10)	Delaware (3–0) (8)	James Madison (3–1)	Furman (5–1) (2)	New Hampshire (5–1) (1)	Montana (5–2) (1)	Southern Illinois (6–2) (1)	UMass (7–2)	Texas State (8–2)	Appalachian State (8–3) (3)	New Hampshire (11–2)	5.
6.	Georgia Southern	Eastern Washington (0–1) (1)	Delaware (1–0) (4)	Delaware (2–0) (4)	James Madison (2–1)	Furman (4–1)	Cal Poly (5–1) (12)	Eastern Washington (4–2)	Texas State (6–1) (3)	Western Kentucky (6–2)	Furman (7–2)	Appalachian State (7–3) (3)	Georgia Southern (8–3)	Cal Poly (9–4)	6.
7.	New Hampshire	New Hampshire (1–0)	William & Mary (1–1) (1)	James Madison (2–1)	Furman (3–1) (1)	Northern Iowa (3–1) (1)	Hampton (6–0) (9)	Texas State (5–1) (1)	UMass (6–1) (2)	Appalachian State (6–2)	Texas State (7–2)	UMass (7–3)	Northern Iowa (8–3)	Southern Illinois (9–4)	7.
8.	Western Kentucky	Western Kentucky (1–0)	James Madison (1–1)	North Dakota State (3–0) (3)	Northern Iowa (2–1) (1)	Hampton (5–0) (1)	New Hampshire (4–1)	UMass (5–1) (2)	Southern Illinois (5–2)	UMass (6–2)	Appalachian State (6–3) (3)	Georgia Southern (8–3)	Southern Illinois (8–3)	Richmond (9–4)	8.
9.	William & Mary (1)	Northwestern State (1–0)	Northern Iowa (2–0) (1)	Furman (2–1)	Hampton (4–0) (2)	Cal Poly (4–1) (3)	Montana State (4–2)	Montana (4–2)	William & Mary (5–2)	Coastal Carolina (7–1)	Coastal Carolina (8–1)	Coastal Carolina (9–1)	Montana (8–3)	Georgia Southern (8–4)	9.
10.	Delaware	Delaware (0–0)	Furman (1–1)	Northern Iowa (2–1)	Cal Poly (3–1)	Lehigh (3–1)	Texas State (4–1)	Southern Illinois (4–2)	Cal Poly (5–2)	Texas State (6–2)	Georgia Southern (7–3)	Northern Iowa (7–3)	Cal Poly (8–3)	Hampton (11–1)	10.
11.	Northwestern State	William & Mary (0–1)	Montana State (1–1) (1)	Hampton (3–0)	Lehigh (2–1)	Montana State (3–2)	William & Mary (3–2)	James Madison (4–2)	Youngstown State (7–1) (1)	Eastern Washington (5–3)	Montana State (6–3)	Southern Illinois (7–3)	Grambling State (8–1)	Grambling State (11–1)	11.
12.	Northern Iowa	Northern Iowa (1–0)	North Dakota State (2–0) (1)	Cal Poly (2–1)	Montana State (2–2)	North Dakota State (4–1)	Eastern Washington (3–2)	William & Mary (4–2)	Appalachian State (5–2)	Montana State (5–3)	Western Kentucky (6–3)	Lehigh (8–2)	Richmond (8–3)	Montana (8–4)	12.
13.	Hampton	Hampton (1–0)	Hampton (2–0)	Lehigh (1–1)	North Dakota State (3–1)	Delaware (3–1)	UMass (4–1)	Northern Iowa (4–2)	Coastal Carolina (6–1)	Lehigh (6–2)	Lehigh (7–2)	Cal Poly (7–3)	Youngstown State (8–3)	Eastern Washington (7–5)	13.
14.	Lehigh	Lehigh (1–0)	Georgia Southern (1–1)	Texas State (2–0)	Eastern Washington (1–2)	Texas State (3–1)	Northern Iowa (3–2)	Coastal Carolina (5–1)	Eastern Washington (4–3)	Georgia Southern (6–3)	Northern Iowa (6–3)	Grambling State (8–1)	South Carolina State (9–2)	Youngstown State (8–3)	14.
15.	UMass (1) (Note: In the actual printed polls, UMass was listed as Massachusetts)	UMass (1–0)	Northwestern State (1–1)	Harvard (1–0) (1)	Harvard (2–0) (1)	Eastern Washington (2–2)	Coastal Carolina (4–1)	Youngstown State (6–1) (1)	Montana State (4–3)	Youngstown State (7–2)	Cal Poly (6–3)	Youngstown State (8–3)	Eastern Washington (7–4)	Brown (9–1)	15.
16.	Sam Houston State	Montana State (0–1)	Lehigh (1–1)	William & Mary (1–2)	Texas State (2–1)	Appalachian State (3–1)	Georgia Southern (4–2)	Appalachian State (4–2)	Lehigh (5–2)	William & Mary (5–3)	Grambling State (7–1)	South Carolina State (8–2)	Brown (9–1)	Eastern Illinois (9–3)	16.
17.	Cal Poly (Note: In the actual printed polls, Cal Poly was listed as Cal Poly San Luis Obispo)	Sam Houston State (1–0)	Coastal Carolina (2–0)	Hofstra (2–0)	Appalachian State (3–1)	William & Mary (2–2)	Youngstown State (5–1)	North Dakota State (4–2)	James Madison (4–3)	Northern Iowa (5–3)	South Carolina State (7–2)	Richmond (7–3)	Montana State (7–4)	Nicholls State (6–4)	17.
18.	Montana State	Harvard (0–0) (1)	Cal Poly (1–1)	Montana State (1–2)	Western Carolina (2–1)	UMass (3–1)	North Dakota State (4–2)	Montana State (4–3)	Illinois State (5–3)	Cal Poly (5–3)	Richmond (6–3)	Brown (8–1)	UMass (7–4)	Montana State (7–4)	18.
19.	Harvard (1)	Cal Poly (0–1)	Harvard (0–0) (1)	Western Carolina (2–1)	William & Mary (2–2)	Coastal Carolina (4–1)	Appalachian State (3–2)	South Carolina State (5–1)	Georgia Southern (5–3)	Grambling State (6–1)	Youngstown State (7–3)	Eastern Washington (6–4)	Eastern Illinois (9–2)	UMass (7–4)	19.
20.	Jacksonville State	North Dakota State (1–0)	Texas State (2–0)	South Carolina State (3–0)	South Carolina State (3–0)	Harvard	Lehigh (3–2)	McNeese State (3–1)	Portland State (5–3)	South Carolina State (6–2)	Brown (7–1)	North Dakota State (7–3)	Coastal Carolina (9–2)	South Carolina State (9–2)	20.
21.	Wofford	Jacksonville State (0–1)	McNeese State (1–0)	Wofford (2–1)	UMass (3–1)	Georgia Southern (3–2)	South Carolina State (4–1)	Lehigh (4–2)	Northern Iowa (4–3)	UC Davis (5–3)	Eastern Washington (5–4)	Eastern Illinois (8–2)	Nicholls State (6–3)	Lafayette (8–4)	21.
22.	North Dakota State	Wofford (1–0)	Western Carolina (2–0)	Appalachian State (2–1)	Wofford (2–1)	Youngstown State (4–1)	Delaware (3–2)	Northwestern State (3–2)	Grambling State (5–1)	Brown (6–1)	North Dakota State (6–3)	Montana State (6–4)	Lehigh (8–3)	Illinois State (7–4)	22.
23.	Texas State	Texas State (1–0)	Hofstra (1–0)	Northwestern State (1–2)	Hofstra (2–1)	Northwestern State (1–2)	Northwestern State (2–2)	Hofstra (4–2)	South Carolina State (5–2)	Richmond (5–3)	Eastern Illinois (7–2)	Western Kentucky (6–4)	Illinois State (7–4)	Colgate (8–4)	23.
24.	Hofstra	Hofstra (0–0)	Sam Houston State (1–1)	UMass (2–1)	Idaho State (3–1)	South Carolina State (3–1)	Stephen F. Austin (4–1)	Georgia Southern (4–3)	Alabama State (6–1)	North Dakota State (5–3)	William & Mary (5–4)	Illinois State (7–4)	Colgate (8–3)	Coastal Carolina (9–2)	24.
25.	Grambling State	Appalachian State (1–0)	UMass (1–1)	Rhode Island (3–0)	Northwestern State (1–2)	Idaho State (3–2)	McNeese State (2–1)	Portland State (4–3)	Penn (5–1)	Eastern Illinois (6–2)	James Madison (5–4)	Nicholls State (5–3)	Lafayette (8–3)	James Madison (7–4)	25.
	Preseason	Week 1 Sept 6	Week 2 Sept 13	Week 3 Sept 20	Week 4 Sept 27	Week 5 Oct 4	Week 6 Oct 11	Week 7 Oct 18	Week 8 Oct 25	Week 9 Nov 1	Week 10 Nov 8	Week 11 Nov 15	Week 12 Nov 22	Week 13 Postseason	
		Dropped: 25 Grambling State	Dropped: 21 Jacksonville State; 22 Wofford; 25 Appalachian State	Dropped: 14 Georgia Southern; 17 Coastal Carolina; 21 McNeese State; 24 Sam Houston State	Dropped: 25 Rhode Island	Dropped: 18 Western Carolina; 22 Wofford; 23 Hofstra	Dropped: 20 Harvard; 25 Idaho State	Dropped: 22 Delaware; 24 Stephen F. Austin	Dropped: 17 North Dakota State; 20 McNeese State; 22 Northwestern State; 23 Hofstra	Dropped: 17 James Madison; 18 Illinois State; 20 Portland State; 24 Alabama State; 25 Penn	Dropped: 21 UC Davis	Dropped: 24 William & Mary; 25 James Madison	Dropped: 20 North Dakota State; 23 Western Kentucky	Dropped: 22 Lehigh	
