= 2005 McNeese State Cowboys football team =

American college football season

2005 McNeese State Cowboys football
- Conference: Southland Conference
- Record: 5–4 (3–3 Southland)
- Head coach: Tommy Tate (6th season)
- Offensive coordinator: Matt Viator (6th season)
- Co-defensive coordinator: Jason Rollins (1st season)
- Home stadium: Cowboy Stadium; Harry Turpin Stadium; Cajun Field

2005 Southland Conference football standings
	Conf.			Overall
Team	W		L	W		L
No. 4 Texas State +^	5	–	1	11	–	3
No. 17 Nicholls State +^	5	–	1	6	–	4
McNeese State	3	–	3	5	–	4
Northwestern State	3	–	3	5	–	5
Southeastern Louisiana	2	–	4	4	–	6
Sam Houston State	2	–	4	3	–	7
Stephen F. Austin	1	–	5	5	–	6
+ – Conference co-champions; ^ – NCAA Division I-AA playoff participant; Rankings from The Sports Network poll

The 2005 McNeese State Cowboys football team was an American football team that represented McNeese State University as a member of the Southland Conference (Southland) during the 2005 NCAA Division I-AA football season. In their sixth year under head coach Tommy Tate, the team compiled an overall record of 5–4, with a mark of 3–3 in conference play, and finished tied for third in the Southland.

== Schedule ==
Date	Opponent	Rank	Site	Result	Attendance	Source
September 3	Southern*		Cowboy Stadium; Lake Charles, LA	Canceled (Note: The game against Southern scheduled for September 3 was canceled due to the impacts of Hurricane Katrina in Greater New Orleans and throughout Louisiana.)		
September 10	at No. 5 Georgia Southern*		Paulson Stadium; Statesboro, GA	W 23–20	20,607	
September 17	at Southern Miss*	No. 21	M. M. Roberts Stadium; Hattiesburg, MS	L 20–48	28,174	
September 25	Northwestern Oklahoma State*		Cowboy Stadium; Lake Charles, LA	Canceled (Note: The game against Northwestern Oklahoma State scheduled for September 25 was canceled due to the impacts of Hurricane Rita in Lake Charles.)		
October 1	Southern Utah*		Cowboy Stadium; Lake Charles, LA	Canceled (Note: The game against Southern Utah scheduled for October 1 was canceled due to the impacts of Hurricane Rita in Lake Charles.)		
October 8	Texas Southern (Note: In the original schedule, October 8 was an open date for McNeese. On October 1, the game against Texas Southern was scheduled as October 8 was also their open week and the Tigers needed another contest after their September 24 game against Northwestern State was canceled due to the impacts of Hurricane Rita. Originally to be played at Cowboy Stadium, the game was played at Natchitoches due to on-going recovery efforts in the wake of Hurricane Rita in Lake Charles.)*		Harry Turpin Stadium; Natchitoches, LA	W 46–28	2,527	
October 15	Stephen F. Austin		Cajun Field; Lafayette, LA (Note: Originally to be played at Cowboy Stadium, the game was played at Lafayette due to on-going recovery efforts in the wake of Hurricane Rita in Lake Charles.)	W 33–23	6,219	
October 22	at Southeastern Louisiana	No. 20	Strawberry Stadium; Hammond, LA	L 13–37	6,082	
October 29	Sam Houston State		Cowboy Stadium; Lake Charles, LA	W 31–26	9,646	
November 5	at No. 10 Texas State		Bobcat Stadium; San Marcos, TX	L 7–49	11,904	
November 12	Northwestern State		Cowboy Stadium; Lake Charles, LA (rivalry)	W 22–17	7,824	
November 19	at No. 25 Nicholls State		John L. Guidry Stadium; Thibodaux, LA	L 26–39	6,571	
*Non-conference game; Rankings from The Sports Network Poll released prior to the game
