= 2005 Western Kentucky Hilltoppers football team =

American college football season

2005 Western Kentucky Hilltoppers football
- Conference: Gateway Football Conference
- Record: 6–5 (4–3 Gateway)
- Head coach: David Elson (3rd season)
- Offensive coordinator: T. J. Weist (3rd season)
- Offensive scheme: Multiple
- Defensive coordinator: Mike Dietzel (2nd season)
- Base defense: 3–4
- Home stadium: L. T. Smith Stadium

2005 Gateway Football Conference standings
| | Conf. | | | Overall |
| Team | W | | L | W | | L |
|---|---|---|---|---|---|---|
| No. 2 Northern Iowa +^ | 5 | – | 2 | 11 | – | 4 |
| No. 7 Southern Illinois +^ | 5 | – | 2 | 9 | – | 4 |
| No. 14 Youngstown State + | 5 | – | 2 | 8 | – | 3 |
| No. 22 Illinois State | 4 | – | 3 | 7 | – | 4 |
| Western Kentucky | 4 | – | 3 | 6 | – | 5 |
| Western Illinois | 3 | – | 4 | 5 | – | 6 |
| Missouri State | 2 | – | 5 | 4 | – | 6 |
| Indiana State | 0 | – | 7 | 0 | – | 11 |
+ – Conference co-champions; ^ – NCAA Division I-AA playoff participant; Rankings from The Sports Network poll

The 2005 Western Kentucky Hilltoppers football team represented Western Kentucky University in the 2005 NCAA Division I-AA football season and were coached by David Elson. The Hilltoppers started the season strong, but after being ranked number 1 in Division I-AA, they lost their last four games and failed to make the playoffs for the first time since 1999.

The team included future National Football League (NFL) players Curtis Hamilton and Greg Ryan. Erik Losey and Antonio Thomas were named to the AP All American team and Chris James made the 1AA All-Star Team. The All-Conference team included Losey, Thomas, James, Lerron Moore, Marion Rumph, Deion Holts, Dennis Mitchell, and Daniel Williams.

== Schedule ==
| Date | Opponent | Rank | Site | Result | Attendance | Source |
|---|---|---|---|---|---|---|
| September 1 | West Virginia Tech* | No. 8 | L. T. Smith Stadium; Bowling Green, KY | W 63–3 | 8,878 | |
| September 10 | Eastern Kentucky* | No. 2 | L. T. Smith Stadium; Bowling Green, KY (Battle of the Bluegrass) | W 23–21 | 18,944 | |
| September 24 | at Auburn* | No. 1 | Jordan–Hare Stadium; Auburn, AL | L 14–37 | 80,632 | |
| October 1 | at Indiana State | No. 3 | Memorial Stadium; Terre Haute, IN | W 38–28 | 2,906 | |
| October 8 | at Illinois State | No. 3 | Hancock Stadium; Normal, IL | W 37–34 ^{OT} | 10,416 | |
| October 15 | Missouri State^{†} | No. 3 | L. T. Smith Stadium; Bowling Green, KY | W 37–28 | 13,105 | |
| October 22 | at Western Illinois | No. 1 | Hanson Field; Macomb, IL | W 42–7 | 13,558 | |
| October 27 | No. 8 Southern Illinois | No. 1 | L. T. Smith Stadium; Bowling Green, KY | L 20–31 | 10,701 | |
| November 5 | No. 14 Northern Iowa | No. 6 | L. T. Smith Stadium; Bowling Green, KY | L 20–23 ^{2OT} | 12,364 | |
| November 12 | at No. 19 Youngstown State | No. 12 | Stambaugh Stadium; Youngstown, OH | L 10–42 | 12,706 | |
| November 19 | at FIU* | No. 23 | Riccardo Silva Stadium; Miami, FL | L 35–38 | 13,388 | |
*Non-conference game; ^{†}Homecoming; Rankings from The Sports Network Poll released prior to the game

FIU's win was later vacated by the NCAA due to infractions.

== Rankings ==
Ranking movements Legend: ██ Increase in ranking ██ Decrease in ranking — = Not ranked RV = Received votes ( ) = First-place votes
| | Week | | | | | | | | | | | | | |
| Poll | Pre | 1 | 2 | 3 | 4 | 5 | 6 | 7 | 8 | 9 | 10 | 11 | 12 | Final |
|---|---|---|---|---|---|---|---|---|---|---|---|---|---|---|
| The Sports Network | 8 | 8 | 2 (4) | 1 (40) | 3 (14) | 3 (3) | 3 (11) | 1 (64) | 1 (78) | 6 | 12 | 23 | RV | — |
