= 2005 Mississippi Valley State Delta Devils football team =

American college football season

2005 Mississippi Valley State Delta Devils football
- Conference: Southwestern Athletic Conference
- East Division
- Record: 6–5 (5–4 SWAC)
- Head coach: Willie Totten (4th season)
- Defensive coordinator: Sam Washington (4th season)
- Home stadium: Rice–Totten Stadium

2005 Southwestern Athletic Conference football standings
	Conf.			Overall
Team	W		L	W		L
East Division
Alabama A&M xy	7	–	2	9	–	3
Alabama State	6	–	3	6	–	5
Mississippi Valley State	5	–	4	6	–	5
Alcorn State	5	–	4	6	–	5
Jackson State	2	–	7	2	–	9
West Division
No. 11 Grambling State xy$	9	–	0	11	–	1
Southern	4	–	5	4	–	5
Prairie View A&M	3	–	6	5	–	6
Arkansas–Pine Bluff	3	–	6	3	–	8
Texas Southern	1	–	8	1	–	10
Championship: Grambling State 45, Alabama A&M 6
$ – Conference champion; x – Division champion/co-champions; y – Championship game participant; Rankings from The Sports Network Poll

The 2005 Mississippi Valley State Delta Devils football team represented Mississippi Valley State University as a member of the Southwestern Athletic Conference (SWAC) during the 2005 NCAA Division I-AA football season. Led by fourth-year head coach Willie Totten, the Delta Devils compiled an overall record of 6–5 and a mark of 5–4 in conference play, and finished tied for third in the SWAC East Division.

== Schedule ==
Date	Opponent	Site	Result	Attendance	Source
September 3	vs. Arkansas–Pine Bluff	Soldier Field; Chicago, IL (Chicago Football Classic)	W 30–17		
September 10	Southern	Rice–Totten Stadium; Itta Bena, MS	W 31–28	8,473	
September 17	at Alabama A&M	Louis Crews Stadium; Normal, AL	L 13–27	7,060	
September 24	Jackson State	Rice–Totten Stadium; Itta Bena, MS	L 14–33	9,975	
October 8	at Grambling State	Eddie G. Robinson Memorial Stadium; Grambling, LA	L 22–37		
October 15	at Paul Quinn*	Tiger Stadium; Lancaster, TX	W 62–0		
October 22	Texas Southern	Rice–Totten Stadium; Itta Bena, MS	W 35–28		
October 29	at Prairie View A&M	Edward L. Blackshear Field; Prairie View, TX	W 58–13		
November 5	at Alcorn State	Jack Spinks Stadium; Lorman, MS	L 36–38		
November 12	Alabama State	Rice–Totten Stadium; Itta Bena, MS	W 38–33		
November 19	Southeastern Louisiana*	Rice–Totten Stadium; Itta Bena, MS	L 21–38	2,030	
*Non-conference game
