= 2005 Southeastern Louisiana Lions football team =

American college football season

2005 Southeastern Louisiana Lions football
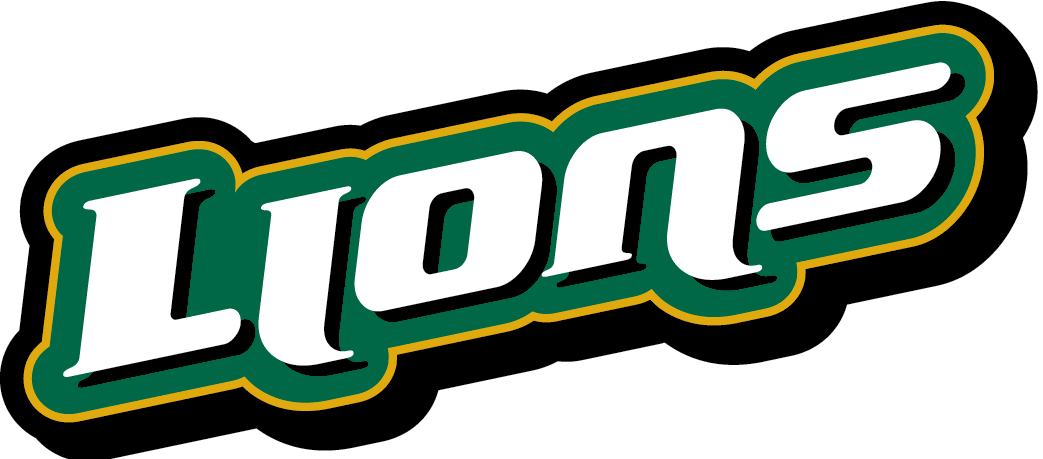
- Conference: Southland Conference
- Record: 4–6 (2–4 Southland)
- Head coach: Dennis Roland (1st season)
- Defensive coordinator: Mike Lucas (1st season)
- Home stadium: Strawberry Stadium

2005 Southland Conference football standings
	Conf.			Overall
Team	W		L	W		L
No. 4 Texas State +^	5	–	1	11	–	3
No. 17 Nicholls State +^	5	–	1	6	–	4
McNeese State	3	–	3	5	–	4
Northwestern State	3	–	3	5	–	5
Southeastern Louisiana	2	–	4	4	–	6
Sam Houston State	2	–	4	3	–	7
Stephen F. Austin	1	–	5	5	–	6
+ – Conference co-champions; ^ – NCAA Division I-AA playoff participant; Rankings from The Sports Network poll

The 2005 Southeastern Louisiana Lions football team represented Southeastern Louisiana University as a member of the Southland Conference during the 2005 NCAA Division I-AA football season. Led by first-year head coach Dennis Roland, the Lions compiled an overall record of 4–6 with a mark of 2–4 in conference play, tying for fifth place Southland. Southeastern Louisiana played home games at Strawberry Stadium in Hammond, Louisiana.

== Schedule ==
Date	Time	Opponent	Site	Result	Attendance	Source
September 1	7:30 pm	Jacksonville*	Strawberry Stadium; Hammond, LA	Canceled (Note: The Lions first game of the season against Jacksonville was cancelled due to Hurricane Katrina.)		
September 10	4:00 pm	Alcorn State*	Strawberry Stadium; Hammond, LA	W 48–21	7,823	
September 17	2:00 pm	at Northern Colorado*	Nottingham Field; Greeley, CO	L 19–35	6,885	
October 1	2:30 pm	vs. Tulane*	Tiger Stadium; Baton Rouge, LA	L 21–28	16,826	
October 8	6:00 pm	No. 14 Texas State	Strawberry Stadium; Hammond, LA	L 15–30	6,374	
October 15	2:00 pm	at No. 23 Northwestern State	Harry Turpin Stadium; Natchitoches, LA (rivalry)	L 10–31	11,137	
October 22	6:00 pm	No. 20 McNeese State	Strawberry Stadium; Hammond, LA	W 37–13	6,082	
October 29	2:00 pm	at Stephen F. Austin	Homer Bryce Stadium; Nacogdoches, TX	W 45–23	9,867	
November 5	4:00 pm	at Sam Houston State	Bowers Stadium; Huntsville, TX	L 18–35	7,235	
November 12	6:00 pm	No. 25 Nicholls State	Strawberry Stadium; Hammond, LA (River Bell Classic)	L 28–38	9,108	
November 19	1:00 pm	at Mississippi Valley State*	Rice–Totten Stadium; Itta Bena, MS	W 38–21	2,030	
*Non-conference game; Rankings from The Sports Network Poll released prior to the game; All times are in Central time
