= 2005 Grambling State Tigers football team =

American college football season

2005 Grambling State Tigers football

Black college national champion SWAC champion

SWAC Championship Game, W 45–6 vs. Alabama A&M
- Conference: Southwestern Athletic Conference
- West Division

Ranking
- Sports Network: No. 11
- Record: 11–1 (9–0 SWAC)
- Head coach: Melvin Spears (2nd season)
- Home stadium: Eddie G. Robinson Memorial Stadium

2005 Southwestern Athletic Conference football standings
	Conf.			Overall
Team	W		L	W		L
East Division
Alabama A&M xy	7	–	2	9	–	3
Alabama State	6	–	3	6	–	5
Mississippi Valley State	5	–	4	6	–	5
Alcorn State	5	–	4	6	–	5
Jackson State	2	–	7	2	–	9
West Division
No. 11 Grambling State xy$	9	–	0	11	–	1
Southern	4	–	5	4	–	5
Prairie View A&M	3	–	6	5	–	6
Arkansas–Pine Bluff	3	–	6	3	–	8
Texas Southern	1	–	8	1	–	10
Championship: Grambling State 45, Alabama A&M 6
$ – Conference champion; x – Division champion/co-champions; y – Championship game participant; Rankings from The Sports Network Poll

The 2005 Grambling State Tigers football team represented Grambling State University as a member of the Southwestern Athletic Conference (SWAC) during the 2005 NCAA Division I-AA football season. Led by second-year head coach Melvin Spears, the Tigers compiled an overall record of 11–1 and a mark of 9–0 in conference play, and finished as both SWAC and black college national champion.

The team’s season, along with the experiences of players and the World Famed Tiger Marching Band, was documented in the six-episode BET docudrama called Season of the Tiger. The series follows quarterback Bruce Eugene, return specialist Landry “Blu” Carter, and several band members, offering a behind-the-scenes look at their athletic performances, personal challenges, and life both on and off the field.

== Schedule ==
Date	Opponent	Rank	Site	Result	Attendance	Source
September 10	Alabama A&M		Eddie G. Robinson Memorial Stadium; Grambling, LA	W 44–0	12,195	
September 17	at Washington State*		Qwest Field; Seattle, WA (Cougar Gridiron Classic)	L 7–48	51,486	
October 1	vs. Prairie View A&M		Cotton Bowl; Dallas, TX (rivalry)	W 50–7	27,949	
October 8	Mississippi Valley State		Eddie G. Robinson Memorial Stadium; Grambling, LA	W 37–22		
October 15	at Arkansas–Pine Bluff		Golden Lion Stadium; Pine Bluff, AR	W 26–23		
October 22	at Jackson State		Mississippi Veterans Memorial Stadium; Jackson, MS	W 52–21	25,879	
October 29	Texas Southern	No. 22	Eddie G. Robinson Memorial Stadium; Grambling, LA	W 58–21	22,032	
November 5	at Alabama State	No. 19	Cramton Bowl; Montgomery, AL	W 32–27	17,286	
November 12	Concordia (AL)*	No. 16	Eddie G. Robinson Memorial Stadium; Grambling, LA	W 82–7	5,085	
November 26	vs. Southern	No. 11	Reliant Stadium; Houston, TX (Bayou Classic / College GameDay)	W 50–35	53,214	
December 3	at Alcorn State	No. 11	Jack Spinks Stadium; Lorman, MS	W 46–19		
December 10	vs. Alabama A&M	No. 11	Legion Field; Birmingham, AL (SWAC Championship Game)	W 45–6	20,612	
*Non-conference game; Rankings from The Sports Network Poll released prior to the game
