= 2006 Southeastern Louisiana Lions football team =

American college football season

2006 Southeastern Louisiana Lions football
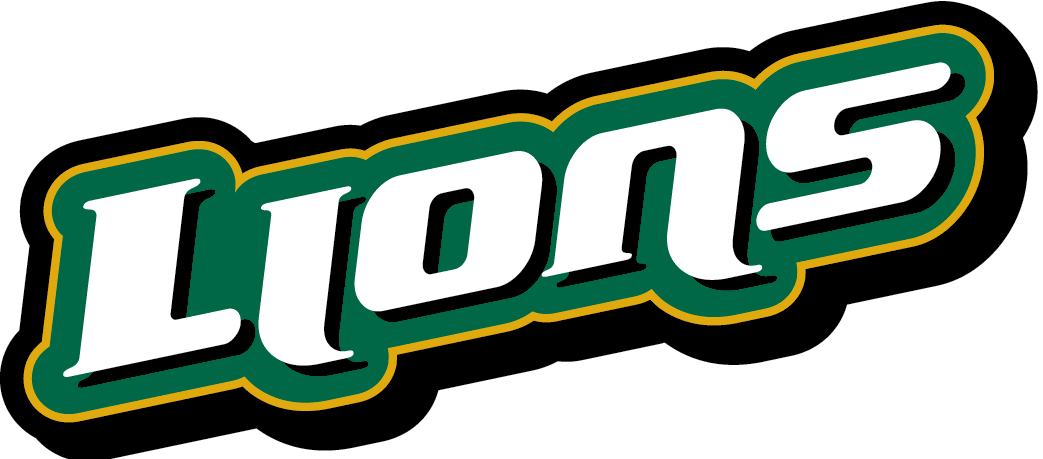
- Conference: Southland Conference
- Record: 2–9 (1–5 Southland)
- Head coach: Dennis Roland (2nd season)
- Offensive coordinator: Scott Highsmith (1st season)
- Defensive coordinator: Mike Lucas (2nd season)
- Home stadium: Strawberry Stadium

2006 Southland Conference football standings
	Conf.			Overall
Team	W		L	W		L
No. 21 McNeese State $^	5	–	1	7	–	5
Sam Houston State	4	–	2	6	–	5
Stephen F. Austin	4	–	2	4	–	7
Texas State	3	–	3	5	–	6
Nicholls State	2	–	4	4	–	7
Northwestern State	2	–	4	4	–	7
Southeastern Louisiana	1	–	5	2	–	9
$ – Conference champion; ^ – FCS playoff participant; Rankings from The Sports Network poll

The 2006 Southeastern Louisiana Lions football team represented Southeastern Louisiana University as a member of the Southland Conference during the 2006 NCAA Division I FCS football season. Led by second-year head coach Dennis Roland, the Lions compiled an overall record of 2–9 with a mark of 1–5 in conference play, placing last in the Southland. Southeastern Louisiana played home games at Strawberry Stadium in Hammond, Louisiana.

== Schedule ==
Date	Time	Opponent	Site	Result	Attendance	Source
August 31	8:00 pm	at New Mexico State*	Aggie Memorial Stadium; Las Cruces, NM	L 15–30	15,561	
September 9	6:00 pm	at Southern Miss*	M. M. Roberts Stadium; Hattiesburg, MS	L 0–45	28,258	
September 16	6:00 pm	Jacksonville*	Strawberry Stadium; Hammond, LA	W 41–13	6,677	
September 23	6:00 pm	at Texas Tech*	Jones SBC Stadium; Lubbock, TX	L 0–62	52,913	
September 30	6:00 pm	Gardner–Webb*	Strawberry Stadium; Hammond, LA	L 21–28	5,122	
October 7	6:30 pm	at Nicholls State	John L. Guidry Stadium; Thibodaux, LA (River Bell Classic)	L 10–14	8,411	
October 14	6:00 pm	Northwestern State	Strawberry Stadium; Hammond, LA (rivalry)	W 31–24 ^{OT}	6,453	
October 21	6:00 pm	at Texas State	Bobcat Stadium; San Marcos, TX	L 17–38	13,321	
October 28	7:00 pm	Stephen F. Austin	Strawberry Stadium; Hammond, LA	L 10–35	6,423	
November 4	7:00 pm	at McNeese State	Cowboy Stadium; Lake Charles, LA	L 13–34	9,834	
November 11	6:00 pm	Sam Houston State	Strawberry Stadium; Hammond, LA	L 23–38	5,125	
*Non-conference game; All times are in Central time
