= 2005 Western Illinois Leathernecks football team =

American college football season

2005 Western Illinois Leathernecks football
- Conference: Gateway Football Conference
- Record: 5–6 (3–4 Gateway)
- Head coach: Don Patterson (7th season)
- Offensive coordinator: Mark Hendrickson (7th season)
- Defensive coordinator: Thomas Casey (1st season)
- Home stadium: Hanson Field

2005 Gateway Football Conference standings
	Conf.			Overall
Team	W		L	W		L
No. 2 Northern Iowa +^	5	–	2	11	–	4
No. 7 Southern Illinois +^	5	–	2	9	–	4
No. 14 Youngstown State +	5	–	2	8	–	3
No. 22 Illinois State	4	–	3	7	–	4
Western Kentucky	4	–	3	6	–	5
Western Illinois	3	–	4	5	–	6
Missouri State	2	–	5	4	–	6
Indiana State	0	–	7	0	–	11
+ – Conference co-champions; ^ – NCAA Division I-AA playoff participant; Rankings from The Sports Network poll

The 2005 Western Illinois Leathernecks football team represented Western Illinois University as a member of the Gateway Football Conference during the 2005 NCAA Division I-AA football season. They were led by seventh-year head coach Don Patterson and played their home games at Hanson Field in Macomb, Illinois. The Leathernecks finished the season with a 5–6 record overall and a 3–4 record in conference play.

== Schedule ==
Date	Time	Opponent	Site	Result	Attendance	Source
September 1	6:00 p.m.	at Toledo*	Glass Bowl; Toledo, OH	L 14–62	20,092	
September 8	7:00 p.m.	Northern Colorado*	Hanson Field; Macomb, IL	W 28–23	9,776	
September 17	7:00 p.m.	at Stephen F. Austin	Homer Bryce Stadium; Nacogdoches, TX	L 36–63	9,675	
September 24	6:05 p.m.	Iowa Wesleyan*	Hanson Field; Macomb, IL	W 70–7	9,133	
October 1	1:05 p.m.	No. 8 Northern Iowa^{†}	Hanson Field; Macomb, IL	L 24–41	14,603	
October 8	6:05 p.m.	No. 2 Southern Illinois	Hanson Field; Macomb, IL	L 24–34	10,112	
October 15	3:00 p.m.	at No. 17 Youngstown State	Stambaugh Stadium; Youngstown, OH	L 21–23	11,909	
October 22	4:05 p.m.	No. 1 Western Kentucky	Hanson Field; Macomb, IL	L 7–42	13,558	
October 29	1:30 p.m.	at No. 18 Illinois State	Hancock Stadium; Normal, IL	W 31–17	9,007	
November 5	12:00 p.m.	at Indiana State	Memorial Stadium; Terre Haute, IN	W 63–35	2,663	
November 12	1:05 p.m.	Missouri State	Hanson Field; Macomb, IL	W 34–24	6,128	
*Non-conference game; ^{†}Homecoming; Rankings from The Sports Network Poll released prior to the game; All times are in Central time
