= 2005 Jackson State Tigers football team =

American college football season

2005 Jackson State Tigers football
- Conference: Southwestern Athletic Conference
- East Division
- Record: 2–9 (2–7 SWAC)
- Head coach: James Bell (3rd season; first 8 games); Daryl Jones (interim, final 3 games)
- Home stadium: Mississippi Veterans Memorial Stadium

2005 Southwestern Athletic Conference football standings
	Conf.			Overall
Team	W		L	W		L
East Division
Alabama A&M xy	7	–	2	9	–	3
Alabama State	6	–	3	6	–	5
Mississippi Valley State	5	–	4	6	–	5
Alcorn State	5	–	4	6	–	5
Jackson State	2	–	7	2	–	9
West Division
No. 11 Grambling State xy$	9	–	0	11	–	1
Southern	4	–	5	4	–	5
Prairie View A&M	3	–	6	5	–	6
Arkansas–Pine Bluff	3	–	6	3	–	8
Texas Southern	1	–	8	1	–	10
Championship: Grambling State 45, Alabama A&M 6
$ – Conference champion; x – Division champion/co-champions; y – Championship game participant; Rankings from The Sports Network Poll

The 2005 Jackson State Tigers football team represented Jackson State University as a member of the Southwestern Athletic Conference (SWAC) during the 2005 NCAA Division I-AA football season. Third-year head coach James Bell, led the Tigers to an overall record of 2–6 prior to him being fired on October 31. Quarterbacks coach Daryl Jones was elevated to interim head coach for the final three game of the season and went winless with a record of 0–3. Overall, the Tigers compiled a record of 2–9 and a mark of 2–7 in conference play, and finished fifth in the SWAC East Division.

== Schedule ==
Date	Opponent	Site	Result	Attendance	Source
September 3	vs. No. 13 Hampton*	Ford Field; Detroit, MI (Detroit Labor Day Classic)	L 7–20	21,130	
September 10	vs. Tennessee State*	Liberty Bowl Memorial Stadium; Memphis, TN (Southern Heritage Classic)	L 14–20 ^{OT}	48,300	
September 17	Texas Southern	Mississippi Veterans Memorial Stadium; Jackson, MS	W 24–21	8,763	
September 24	at Mississippi Valley State	Rice–Totten Stadium; Itta Bena, MS	W 33–14	9,975	
October 8	Alabama State	Mississippi Veterans Memorial Stadium; Jackson, MS	L 23–44	10,040	
October 15	at Southern	A. W. Mumford Stadium; Baton Rouge, LA (rivalry)	L 14–20	21,617	
October 22	Grambling State	Mississippi Veterans Memorial Stadium; Jackson, MS	L 21–52	25,879	
October 29	Arkansas–Pine Bluff	Mississippi Veterans Memorial Stadium; Jackson, MS	L 36–64	2,831	
November 5	at Alabama A&M	Louis Crews Stadium; Normal, AL	L 6–52		
November 12	at Prairie View A&M	Edward L. Blackshear Field; Prairie View, TX	L 9–27	2,987	
November 19	Alcorn State	Mississippi Veterans Memorial Stadium; Jackson, MS (Soul Bowl)	L 14–31	25,473	
*Non-conference game; Rankings from The Sports Network Poll released prior to the game
