= Tommy Tate =

American football player and coach (born 1956)

Current position
- Title: Athletic director, defensive coordinator
- Team: Opelousas Catholic (LA)

Biographical details
- Born: February 26, 1956 (age 70); Washington, Louisiana, U.S.

Playing career
- 1975–1978: McNeese State
- Position: Defensive back

Coaching career (HC unless noted)
- 1979–1998: McNeese State (assistant/DC)
- 1999: McNeese State (DC)
- 2000–2006: McNeese State
- 2007–2011: Crowley HS (LA)
- 2011–2012: Rayne HS (LA) (assistant)
- 2013–present: Opelousas Catholic (LA) (DC)

Administrative career (AD unless noted)
- 2013–present: Opelousas Catholic (LA)

Head coaching record
- Overall: 49–26 (college)

Accomplishments and honors

Championships
- 3 SLC (2001–2003)

Awards
- Eddie Robinson Award (2002); SLC Coach of the Year (2003)

Thomas Tate (born February 26, 1956) is an American football coach and athletics administrator. He is the athletic director and defensive coordinator at Opelousas Catholic School in Opelousas, Louisiana, positions he has held since 2013. Tate served as the head football coach at McNeese State University from 2000 to 2006. He compiled a record of 49–26 led the McNeese State Cowboys to three consecutive Southland Conference titles, from 2001 to 2003. Tate was given the Eddie Robinson Award in 2002 as the coach of the year in NCAA Division I-AA, when he guided the Cowboys to a 13–2 record and an appearance in the NCAA Division I-AA Football Championship, where his team finished as runners-up. Tate was fired in the middle of the 2006 season after the Cowboys started 1–3. He was replaced by Matt Viator, who coached McNeese to a 6–2 record the rest of the way (finishing 7–5) and earned the school another Southland Conference title.

== Early life ==
Tate hails from Washington, Louisiana. He graduated from Port Barre High School in Point Barre in 1974.

== Coaching career ==
Tate was an assistant coach at McNeese State for 21 seasons, from 1979 to 1999, serving under six head coaches: Ernie Duplechin, Hubert Boales, John McCann, Sonny Jackson, Bobby Keasler, and Kirby Bruchhaus. Tate was appointed as head coach in June 2000 after Bruchhaus resigned amid allegations that he had bet on professional and college football games.

== Head coaching record ==
=== College ===
| Year | Team | Overall | Conference | Standing | Bowl/playoffs | TSN^{#} | Coaches^{°} |
|---|---|---|---|---|---|---|---|
McNeese State Cowboys (Southland Conference) (2000–2006)
| 2000 | McNeese State | 8–4 | 5–2 | T–2nd | L NCAA Division I-AA First Round | 16 | 16 |
| 2001 | McNeese State | 8–4 | 5–1 | T–1st | L NCAA Division I-AA First Round | 13 | 13 |
| 2002 | McNeese State | 13–2 | 6–0 | 1st | L NCAA Division I-AA Championship | 2 | 2 |
| 2003 | McNeese State | 10–2 | 5–0 | 1st | L NCAA Division I-AA First Round | 8 | 7 |
| 2004 | McNeese State | 4–7 | 1–4 | T–5th | | | |
| 2005 | McNeese State | 5–4 | 3–3 | T–3rd | | | |
| 2006 | McNeese State | 1–3 | 0–0 | | | | |
| McNeese State: | | 49–26 | 25–10 | | | | |
| Total: | | 49–26 | | | | | |
National championship Conference title Conference division title or championship game berth
