= 2005 Illinois State Redbirds football team =

American college football season

2005 Illinois State Redbirds football
- Conference: Gateway Football Conference

Ranking
- Sports Network: No. 22
- Record: 7–4 (4–3 Gateway)
- Head coach: Denver Johnson (6th season)
- Offensive coordinator: Justin Fuente (2nd season)
- MVPs: Brent Hawkins; Laurent Robinson
- Captain: Game captains
- Home stadium: Hancock Stadium

2005 Gateway Football Conference standings
	Conf.			Overall
Team	W		L	W		L
No. 2 Northern Iowa +^	5	–	2	11	–	4
No. 7 Southern Illinois +^	5	–	2	9	–	4
No. 14 Youngstown State +	5	–	2	8	–	3
No. 22 Illinois State	4	–	3	7	–	4
Western Kentucky	4	–	3	6	–	5
Western Illinois	3	–	4	5	–	6
Missouri State	2	–	5	4	–	6
Indiana State	0	–	7	0	–	11
+ – Conference co-champions; ^ – NCAA Division I-AA playoff participant; Rankings from The Sports Network poll

The 2005 Illinois State Redbirds football team represented Illinois State University as a member of the Gateway Football Conference during the 2005 NCAA Division I-AA football season. Led by sixth-year head coach Denver Johnson, the Redbirds compiled an overall record of 7–4 with a mark of 4–3 in conference play, tying for fourth place in the Gateway. The team was ranked No. 22 in The Sports Network's postseason NCAA Division I-AA rankings. Illinois State played home games at Hancock Stadium in Normal, Illinois.

== Schedule ==
Date	Time	Opponent	Rank	Site	Result	Attendance	Source
September 3	6:00 p.m.	at Iowa State*		Jack Trice Stadium; Ames, IA	L 21–32	44,058	
September 10	6:30 p.m.	Drake*		Hancock Stadium; Normal, IL	W 56–19	8,188	
September 17	6:00 p.m.	at Eastern Illinois*		O'Brien Stadium; Charleston, IL (rivalry)	W 27–6	6,785	
September 24	6:30 p.m.	Murray State*		Hancock Stadium; Normal, IL	W 42–0	7,233	
October 1	6:00 p.m.	at Youngstown State		Stambaugh Stadium; Youngstown, OH	L 20–17	16,809	
October 8	2:30 p.m.	No. 3 Western Kentucky^{†}		Hancock Stadium; Normal, IL	L 34–37 ^{OT}	10,416	
October 15	6:00 p.m.	at No. 1 Southern Illinois		McAndrew Stadium; Carbondale, IL	W 61–35	11,381	
October 22	1:30 p.m.	No. 13 Northern Iowa		Hancock Stadium; Normal, IL	W 38–3	12,626	
October 29	1:30 p.m.	Western Illinois	No. 18	Hancock Stadium; Normal, IL	L 17–31	9,007	
November 5	1:00 p.m.	at Missouri State		Plaster Sports Complex; Springfield, MO	W 48–23	7,155	
November 12	1:30 p.m.	Indiana State		Hancock Stadium; Normal, IL	W 70–28	7,034	
*Non-conference game; ^{†}Homecoming; Rankings from The Sports Network Poll released prior to the game; All times are in Central time
