= 2006 McNeese State Cowboys football team =

American college football season

2006 McNeese State Cowboys football

Southland champion

NCAA Division I First Round, L 6–31 vs. Montana
- Conference: Southland Conference

Ranking
- Sports Network: No. 21
- Record: 7–5 (5–1 Southland)
- Head coach: Tommy Tate (7th season; first 4 games); Matt Viator (interim, games 5–12)
- Offensive coordinator: Matt Viator (7th season)
- Co-offensive coordinator: Ben Norton (1st season)
- Co-defensive coordinator: Jason Rollins (2nd season)
- Home stadium: Cowboy Stadium

2006 Southland Conference football standings
	Conf.			Overall
Team	W		L	W		L
No. 21 McNeese State $^	5	–	1	7	–	5
Sam Houston State	4	–	2	6	–	5
Stephen F. Austin	4	–	2	4	–	7
Texas State	3	–	3	5	–	6
Nicholls State	2	–	4	4	–	7
Northwestern State	2	–	4	4	–	7
Southeastern Louisiana	1	–	5	2	–	9
$ – Conference champion; ^ – FCS playoff participant; Rankings from The Sports Network poll

The 2006 McNeese State Cowboys football team was an American football team that represented McNeese State University as a member of the Southland Conference (Southland) during the 2006 NCAA Division I FCS football season. In their seventh year under head coach Tommy Tate, the team compiled an overall record of 7–5, with a mark of 5–1 in conference play, and finished as Southland champion. The Cowboys advanced to the NCAA Division I Football Championship playoffs and lost to Montana in the first round.

After a 1–4 start to the season, Tate was fired as head coach and replaced with Matt Viator as interim head coach. After a 5–1 start as interim head coach, on November 13 Viator was named as permanent head coach of the Cowboys.

== Schedule ==
Date	Opponent	Rank	Site	Result	Attendance	Source
September 2	at South Florida*	No. 11	Raymond James Stadium; Tampa, FL	L 10–41	26,351	
September 9	West Virginia Tech*	No. 16	Cowboy Stadium; Lake Charles, LA	W 76–0	12,127	
September 23	at Toledo*	No. 13	Glass Bowl; Toledo, OH	L 7–41	20,057	
September 30	South Dakota State*	No. 16	Cowboy Stadium; Lake Charles, LA	L 17–20	10,400	
October 7	Southern Utah*		Cowboy Stadium; Lake Charles, LA	W 30–27	9,450	
October 14	Texas State		Cowboy Stadium; Lake Charles, LA	L 17–27	11,640	
October 21	at Stephen F. Austin		Homer Bryce Stadium; Nacogdoches, TX	W 20–17	8,754	
October 28	at Sam Houston State		Bowers Stadium; Huntsville, TX	W 31–18	10,018	
November 4	Southeastern Louisiana		Cowboy Stadium; Lake Charles, LA	W 34–13	9,834	
November 11	at Northwestern State		Harry Turpin Stadium; Natchitoches, LA (rivalry)	W 29–26 ^{OT}	11,218	
November 18	Nicholls State		Cowboy Stadium; Lake Charles, LA	W 26–10	11,842	
November 25	at No. 2 Montana*	No. 22	Washington–Grizzly Stadium; Missoula, MT (NCAA Division I First Round)	L 6–31	20,077	
*Non-conference game; Rankings from The Sports Network Poll released prior to the game
