= Dennis Roland =

American football player (born 1983)

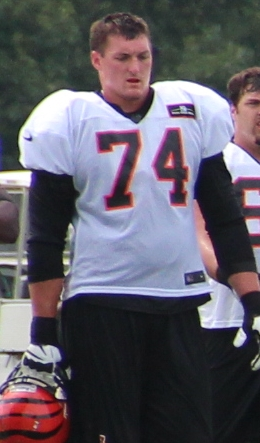
- Roland with the Cincinnati Bengals in 2013

No. 74
- Position: Offensive tackle

Personal information
- Born: March 10, 1983 (age 43); Lynchburg, Virginia, U.S.
- Listed height: 6 ft 10 in (2.08 m)
- Listed weight: 315 lb (143 kg)

Career information
- High school: Bolivar (MO)
- College: Georgia
- NFL draft: 2006: undrafted

Career history
- Dallas Cowboys (2006)*; Tampa Bay Buccaneers (2006–2007)*; Cincinnati Bengals (2008–2013); Chicago Bears (2014)*
- * Offseason or practice squad member only

Awards and highlights
- SEC Offensive Lineman of the Week (9/12/05)

Career NFL statistics
- Games played: 71
- Games started: 30
- Stats at Pro Football Reference

Dennis Roland Jr. (born March 10, 1983) is an American former professional football player who was an offensive tackle in the National Football League (NFL) for the Cincinnati Bengals. He played college football for the Georgia Bulldogs.

== Early life ==
Roland attended Bolivar High School. As a senior, he received All-Central Ozark Conference honors at tackle on both offense and defense. He also practiced basketball.

He accepted a football scholarship from the University of Georgia. As a sophomore, he started the last 2 games of the season.

As a junior, teammate Max Jean-Gilles moved to offensive guard, allowing Roland to replace him as a starter at tackle.

As a senior, he contributed to the team defeating Louisiana State University by a score of 34–14, to win the 2005 SEC Championship Game. He started 24 out of 25 games, during his final two seasons.

== Professional career ==
Pre-draft measurables
Height	Weight	Arm length	Hand span	40-yard dash	10-yard split	20-yard split	20-yard shuttle	Three-cone drill	Vertical jump	Broad jump	Bench press
6 ft 9 5/8 in (2.07 m)	328 lb (149 kg)	34 7/8 in (0.89 m)	10 5/8 in (0.27 m)	5.30 s	1.82 s	3.00 s	4.84 s	7.75 s	29.5 in (0.75 m)	9 ft 7 in (2.92 m)	21 reps
All values from NFL Combine/Pro Day

=== Dallas Cowboys ===
Roland was signed as an undrafted free agent by the Dallas Cowboys after the 2006 NFL draft on May 4. He was released before the start of the season on September 4.

=== Tampa Bay Buccaneers ===
On September 4, 2006, he signed as a free agent with the Tampa Bay Buccaneers and spent the season on the practice squad.

On September 1, 2007, he was released. He was signed to the practice squad for 13 games. On October 2, he was promoted to the active roster and was declared inactive in 2 regular-season games (against the Indianapolis Colts and Tennessee Titans). On October 19, he was cut and re-signed to the practice squad on October 23. He was released on August 30, 2008.

=== Cincinnati Bengals ===
On September 3, 2008, he was signed by the Cincinnati Bengals to the practice squad. He was released on September 11. He was re-signed to the practice squad on September 16. He spent the first 10 games on the practice squad. On November 19, he was promoted to the active roster and was active-DNP for games 11 to 14. On December 21, he made his NFL debut against the Cleveland Browns, subbing in fourth quarter at right tackle for an injured Stacy Andrews. On December 20, he started in place of Andrews against the Kansas City Chiefs.

In 2009, he appeared in 16 games with 12 starts (9 at right tackle and 3 at tight end). He started the Wild Card playoff game against the New York Jets. He contributed to the team winning the AFC North conference and finishing ninth in the league in rushing (128.5 yards per game), including a team-record of eight games of 100 or more yards by individual running backs. His pass blocking helped the team rank ninth in league in fewest sacks allowed (29). He helped Cedric Benson rush for a career-high 189 yards against the Chicago Bears.

In 2010, he appeared in 16 games with 12 starts.

In 2011, he appeared in 16 games with 3 starts, when the team opened the game in extra tight end formation. He was a backup offensive tackle, an extra tight end on selected plays and also played on special teams.

In 2012, he appeared in 16 games with 2 starts.

On August 31, 2013, he was released before the start of the season. On September 4, he was re-signed and appeared in 3 games. He was cut on September 25. He was re-signed on December 3 and appeared in 2 additional games. He wasn't re-signed after the season.

=== Chicago Bears ===
On July 31, 2014, he signed as a free agent with the Chicago Bears. He was released before the start of the season on August 29.

== Personal life ==
Roland's father, Dennis Sr., served as the head football coach at Olivet Nazarene University from 1986 to 1990.
