= James Bell (American football) =

American football coach

Playing career
- 1977–1980: Central Arkansas

Coaching career (HC unless noted)
- 1981: Central Arkansas (GA)
- 1982: Lamar (WR/TE)
- 1983–1985: Lamar (DB)
- 1986–1987: James Madison HS (TX) (DC)
- 1988–1992: Northwest Missouri State (DC/LB)
- 1993: Louisville (DC)
- 1994–1995: North Texas (DC)
- 1996: Wake Forest (DB)
- 1997–1999: Wake Forest (DC/DB)
- 2000–2001: Indiana (DC)
- 2002: Chávez HS (TX)
- 2003–2005: Jackson State
- 2006–2007: Taylor
- 2008: Veritas Sports Academy
- 2009–2010: Drew Central HS (AR)
- 2011–2012: St. James HS (LA)
- 2013: Jonesboro-Hodge HS (LA)

Head coaching record
- Overall: 11–41 (college); 10–50 (high school)

James Bell is an American football coach and former player. He served as the head football coach at Jackson State University in Jackson, Mississippi from 2003 to 2005 and Taylor University in Upland, Indiana from 2006 to 2007, compiling a career college football coaching record of 11–41.

== Head coaching record ==
=== College ===
Year	Team	Overall	Conference	Standing	Bowl/playoffs
Jackson State Tigers (Southwestern Athletic Conference) (2003–2005)
2003	Jackson State	2–10	2–5	4th (East)	
2004	Jackson State	4–7	3–4	4th (East)	
2005	Jackson State	2–6 (Note: Bell was fired after the first eight games of the season. Daryl Jones was appointed interim head coach and led Jackson State for the final three games of the season. The Tigers finished 2–9 overall and 2–7 in Southwestern Athletic Conference play, placing fifth in the East Division.)	2–4	(East)	
Jackson State:		8–23	7–13		
Taylor Trojans (Mid-States Football Association) (2006–2007)
2006	Taylor	1–9	0–6	7th (MEL)	
2007	Taylor	2–9	0–7	8th (MEL)	
Taylor:		3–18	0–13		
Total:		11–41			

=== High school ===
Year	Team	Overall	Conference	Standing	Bowl/playoffs
Chávez Lobos () (2002)
2002	Chávez	1–9			
Chávez:		1–9			
Drew Central Pirates () (2009–2010)
2009	Drew Central	3–7	2–5	6th	
2010	Drew Central	3–7	1–6	7th	
Drew Central:		6–14	3–11		
St. James Wildcats () (2011–2012)
2011	St. James	0–10	0–5	6th	
2012	St. James	0–9	0–5	6th	
St. James:		0–19	0–10		
Jonesboro-Hodge Tigers () (2013)
2013	Jonesboro-Hodge	3–8	1–4	4th	
Jonesboro-Hodge:		3–8	1–4		
Total:		10–50			
