= Robert McFarland (American football) =

American football coach (born 1961)

Biographical details
- Born: January 1, 1961 (age 65); Long Beach, California, U.S.
- Education: McNeese State University

Coaching career (HC unless noted)
- 1986–1987: Southwestern Louisiana (GA)
- 1988–1989: Clemson (GA)
- 1990: Notre Dame (GA)
- 1991: Kent State (OL)
- 1992–1998: Stephen F. Austin (OL)
- 1999: Stephen F. Austin (RGC/OL)
- 2000: UCF (OL)
- 2001–2003: UCF (OC/OL)
- 2004: East Carolina (OL)
- 2005–2006: Stephen F. Austin
- 2007–2008: Iowa State (OC/OL)
- 2010: Florida Tuskers (RGC/TE)
- 2011: Sacramento Mountain Lions (OL)
- 2012–2014: Copiah–Lincoln (OC/OL)
- 2015–2020: Louisiana Tech (OL)
- 2024: Stephen F. Austin (AOL)

Head coaching record
- Overall: 9–13

Robert McFarland (born January 1, 1961) is an American former football coach. He served as the head football coach at Stephen F. Austin State University from 2005 to 2006, compiling a record of 9–13. He returned to Stephen F. Austin State in 2024 as the team's assistant offensive line coach.

== Head coaching record ==
Year	Team	Overall	Conference	Standing	Bowl/playoffs
Stephen F. Austin Lumberjacks (Southland Conference) (2005–2006)
2005	Stephen F. Austin	5–6	1–5	7th	
2006	Stephen F. Austin	4–7	4–2	T–2nd	
Stephen F. Austin:		9–13	5–7		
Total:		9–13			
