= 2005 Southern Illinois Salukis football team =

American college football season

2005 Southern Illinois Salukis football

Gateway co-champion

NCAA Division I-AA Quarterfinal, L 24–38 vs. Appalachian State
- Conference: Gateway Football Conference

Ranking
- Sports Network: No. 7
- Record: 9–4 (5–2 Gateway)
- Head coach: Jerry Kill (5th season)
- Offensive coordinator: Matt Limegrover (5th season)
- Defensive coordinator: Tracy Claeys (5th season)
- Home stadium: McAndrew Stadium

2005 Gateway Football Conference standings
	Conf.			Overall
Team	W		L	W		L
No. 2 Northern Iowa +^	5	–	2	11	–	4
No. 7 Southern Illinois +^	5	–	2	9	–	4
No. 14 Youngstown State +	5	–	2	8	–	3
No. 22 Illinois State	4	–	3	7	–	4
Western Kentucky	4	–	3	6	–	5
Western Illinois	3	–	4	5	–	6
Missouri State	2	–	5	4	–	6
Indiana State	0	–	7	0	–	11
+ – Conference co-champions; ^ – NCAA Division I-AA playoff participant; Rankings from The Sports Network poll

The 2005 Southern Illinois Salukis football team represented Southern Illinois University as a member of the Gateway Football Conference during the 2005 NCAA Division I-AA football season. They were led by fifth-year head coach Jerry Kill and played their home games at McAndrew Stadium in Carbondale, Illinois. The Salukis finished the season with a 9–4 record overall and a 5–2 record in conference play, making them conference co-champions. The team received an at-large bid to the Division I-AA playoffs, where they defeated Eastern Illinois before losing to Appalachian State in the quarterfinals. Southern Illinois was ranked No. 7 in The Sports Network's postseason ranking of FCS teams.

== Schedule ==
Date	Time	Opponent	Rank	Site	TV	Result	Attendance	Source
September 1	6:00 p.m.	at Southeast Missouri State*	No. 5	Houck Stadium; Cape Girardeau, MO		W 58–23	10,100	
September 10	6:00 p.m.	Union (KY)*	No. 4	McAndrew Stadium; Carbondale, IL		W 82–7	9,557	
September 17	6:00 p.m.	at Western Michigan*	No. 1	Waldo Stadium; Kalamazoo, MI		L 28–34	24,497	
October 1	1:30 p.m.	Missouri State^{†}	No. 2	McAndrew Stadium; Carbondale, IL		W 30–23 ^{OT}	13,140	
October 8	6:00 p.m.	at Western Illinois	No. 2	Hanson Field; Macomb, IL		W 34–24	10,112	
October 15	6:00 p.m.	Illinois State	No. 1	McAndrew Stadium; Carbondale, IL		L 35–61	11,381	
October 22	2:00 p.m.	at Indiana State	No. 10	Memorial Stadium; Terre Haute, IN		W 42–20	3,714	
October 27	6:30 p.m.	at No. 1 Western Kentucky	No. 8	L. T. Smith Stadium; Bowling Green, KY		W 31–20	10,701	
November 5	3:00 p.m.	No. 15 Youngstown State	No. 5	McAndrew Stadium; Carbondale, IL		W 31–17	8,017	
November 12	5:05 p.m.	at No. 14 Northern Iowa	No. 4	UNI-Dome; Cedar Falls, IA		L 24–25	15,536	
November 19	3:00 p.m.	No. 20 North Dakota State*	No. 11	McAndrew Stadium; Carbondale, IL		W 9–0	5,809	
November 26	1:00 p.m.	at No. 19 Eastern Illinois*	No. 8	O'Brien Field; Charleston, IL (NCAA Division I-AA First Round)		W 21–6	2,896	
December 3	1:30 p.m.	at No. 5 Appalachian State*	No. 8	Kidd Brewer Stadium; Boone, NC (NCAA Division I-AA Quarterfinal)	ESPNU	L 24–38	11,108	
*Non-conference game; ^{†}Homecoming; Rankings from The Sports Network Poll released prior to the game; All times are in Central time
