= 2005 Alabama State Hornets football team =

American college football season

2005 Alabama State Hornets football
- Conference: Southwestern Athletic Conference
- East Division
- Record: 6–5 (6–3 SWAC)
- Head coach: Charles Coe (3rd season)
- Offensive coordinator: Chris Kapilovic (3rd season)
- Home stadium: Cramton Bowl

2005 Southwestern Athletic Conference football standings
	Conf.			Overall
Team	W		L	W		L
East Division
Alabama A&M xy	7	–	2	9	–	3
Alabama State	6	–	3	6	–	5
Mississippi Valley State	5	–	4	6	–	5
Alcorn State	5	–	4	6	–	5
Jackson State	2	–	7	2	–	9
West Division
No. 11 Grambling State xy$	9	–	0	11	–	1
Southern	4	–	5	4	–	5
Prairie View A&M	3	–	6	5	–	6
Arkansas–Pine Bluff	3	–	6	3	–	8
Texas Southern	1	–	8	1	–	10
Championship: Grambling State 45, Alabama A&M 6
$ – Conference champion; x – Division champion/co-champions; y – Championship game participant; Rankings from The Sports Network Poll

The 2005 Alabama State Hornets football team represented Alabama State University as a member of the East Division of the Southwestern Athletic Conference (SWAC) during the 2005 NCAA Division I-AA football season. Led by third-year head coach Charles Coe, the Hornets compiled an overall record of 6–5 with a mark of 6–3 in conference play, placing second in the SWAC's East Division. Alabama State played home games at Cramton Bowl in Montgomery, Alabama.

== Schedule ==
Date	Time	Opponent	Rank	Site	TV	Result	Attendance	Source
September 3		vs. South Carolina State*		Legion Field; Birmingham, AL (MEAC/SWAC Challenge)	ESPN2	L 14–27	18,452	
September 10		vs. Texas Southern		Lobo Stadium; Longview, TX		W 27–15		
September 17		at Arkansas–Pine Bluff		Golden Lion Stadium; Pine Bluff, AR		W 41–10	8,313	
September 24		Alcorn State		Cramton Bowl; Montgomery, AL		W 38–3	10,581	
October 1	5:00 p.m.	vs. Southern		Ladd–Peebles Stadium; Mobile, AL (Gulf Coast Classic)		W 45–35	24,811	
October 8	6:00 p.m.	at Jackson State		Mississippi Veterans Memorial Stadium; Jackson, MS		W 44–23	10,040	
October 15	7:00 p.m.	Prairie View A&M		Cramton Bowl; Montgomery, AL		W 34–13	6,036	
October 29	2:30 p.m.	vs. Alabama A&M	No. 24	Legion Field; Birmingham, AL (Magic City Classic)	ESPNU	L 28–31	68,238	
November 5	1:00 p.m.	No. 19 Grambling State		Cramton Bowl; Montgomery, AL		L 27–32	17,286	
November 12	2:30 p.m.	at Mississippi Valley State		Rice–Totten Stadium; Itta Bena, MS		L 33–38		
November 24	1:00 p.m.	Tuskegee*		Cramton Bowl; Montgomery, AL (Turkey Day Classic)		L 27–28	22,826	
*Non-conference game; Rankings from The Sports Network Poll released prior to the game; All times are in Central time
