= 2005 Northwestern State Demons football team =

American college football season

2005 Northwestern State Demons football
- Conference: Southland Conference
- Record: 5–5 (3–3 Southland)
- Head coach: Scott Stoker (4th season)
- Co-offensive coordinator: Broderick Fobbs (1st season)
- Defensive coordinator: Brad Laird (3rd season)
- Home stadium: Harry Turpin Stadium

2005 Southland Conference football standings
	Conf.			Overall
Team	W		L	W		L
No. 4 Texas State +^	5	–	1	11	–	3
No. 17 Nicholls State +^	5	–	1	6	–	4
McNeese State	3	–	3	5	–	4
Northwestern State	3	–	3	5	–	5
Southeastern Louisiana	2	–	4	4	–	6
Sam Houston State	2	–	4	3	–	7
Stephen F. Austin	1	–	5	5	–	6
+ – Conference co-champions; ^ – NCAA Division I-AA playoff participant; Rankings from The Sports Network poll

The 2005 Northwestern State Demons football team represented Northwestern State University as a member of the Southland Conference during the 2005 NCAA Division I-AA football season. Led by fourth-year head coach Scott Stoker, the Demons compiled an overall record of 5–5 with a mark of 3–3 in conference play, tying for third place in the Southland. Northwestern State played home games at Harry Turpin Stadium in Natchitoches, Louisiana.

== Schedule ==
Date	Time	Opponent	Rank	Site	TV	Result	Attendance	Source
September 1	7:00 pm	at Louisiana–Monroe*		Malone Stadium; Monroe, LA (rivalry)		W 27–23	21,726	
September 10	6:00 pm	No. 20 North Dakota State*	No. 9	Harry Turpin Stadium; Natchitoches, LA		L 7–35	13,252	
September 17	7:00 pm	at Louisiana–Lafayette*		Cajun Field; Lafayette, LA		L 28–49	17,341	
September 24		Texas Southern*		Harry Turpin Stadium; Natchitoches, LA		Canceled (Note: The game against Texas Southern scheduled for September 24 was canceled due to the impacts of Hurricane Rita.)		
October 8	2:00 pm	at Sam Houston State	No. 23	Bowers Stadium; Huntsville, TX		W 10–6	10,610	
October 15	2:00 pm	Southeastern Louisiana	No. 23	Harry Turpin Stadium; Natchitoches, LA (rivalry)		W 31–10	11,137	
October 22	6:00 pm	at No. 7 Texas State	No. 22	Bobcat Stadium; San Marcos, TX	TSAA	L 16–31	13,852	
October 29	12:00 pm	Northeastern*		Harry Turpin Stadium; Natchitoches, LA		W 14–12	6,287	
November 5	6:00 pm	Nicholls State		Harry Turpin Stadium; Natchitoches, LA (NSU Challenge)		L 24–31	7,368	
November 12	1:00 pm	at McNeese State		Cowboy Stadium; Lake Charles, LA (rivalry)	SCTN	L 17–22	7,824	
November 17	6:30 pm	Stephen F. Austin		Harry Turpin Stadium; Natchitoches, LA (Chief Caddo)		W 41–21	3,872	
*Non-conference game; Rankings from The Sports Network Poll released prior to the game; All times are in Central time
