= 2005 Texas Southern Tigers football team =

American college football season

2005 Texas Southern Tigers football
- Conference: Southwestern Athletic Conference
- West Division
- Record: 1–10 (1–8 SWAC)
- Head coach: Steve Wilson (2nd season)
- Home stadium: Alexander Durley Sports Complex; Reliant Stadium

2005 Southwestern Athletic Conference football standings
	Conf.			Overall
Team	W		L	W		L
East Division
Alabama A&M xy	7	–	2	9	–	3
Alabama State	6	–	3	6	–	5
Mississippi Valley State	5	–	4	6	–	5
Alcorn State	5	–	4	6	–	5
Jackson State	2	–	7	2	–	9
West Division
No. 11 Grambling State xy$	9	–	0	11	–	1
Southern	4	–	5	4	–	5
Prairie View A&M	3	–	6	5	–	6
Arkansas–Pine Bluff	3	–	6	3	–	8
Texas Southern	1	–	8	1	–	10
Championship: Grambling State 45, Alabama A&M 6
$ – Conference champion; x – Division champion/co-champions; y – Championship game participant; Rankings from The Sports Network Poll

The 2005 Texas Southern Tigers football team represented Texas Southern University as a member of the Southwestern Athletic Conference (SWAC) during the 2005 NCAA Division I-AA football season. Led by second-year head coach Steve Wilson, the Tigers compiled an overall record of 1–10, with a mark of 1–8 in conference play, and finished fifth in the West Division of the SWAC.

== Schedule ==
Date	Opponent	Site	Result	Attendance	Source
September 10	vs. Alabama State	Lobo Stadium; Longview, TX	L 15–27		
September 17	at Jackson State	Mississippi Veterans Memorial Stadium; Jackson, MS	L 21–24	8,763	
September 24	at Northwestern State*	Harry Turpin Stadium; Natchitoches, LA	Canceled (Note: The game against Northwestern State scheduled for September 24 was canceled due to the impacts of Hurricane Rita in Louisiana.)		
October 1	at Alabama A&M	Louis Crews Stadium; Normal, AL	W 17–7		
October 8	at McNeese State (Note: In the original schedule, October 8 was an open date for Texas Southern. On October 1, the game against McNeese State was scheduled as October 8 was also their open week as the Cowboys needed another contest after their September 25 game against Northwestern Oklahoma State was canceled due to the impacts of Hurricane Rita. Originally to be played at Cowboy Stadium, the game was played at Natchitoches due to on-going recovery efforts in the wake of Hurricane Rita in Lake Charles.)*	Harry Turpin Stadium; Natchitoches, LA	L 28–46	2,527	
October 15	Alcorn State	Alexander Durley Sports Complex; Houston, TX	L 22–29		
October 22	at Mississippi Valley State	Rice–Totten Stadium; Itta Bena, MS	L 28–35		
October 29	at No. 22 Grambling State	Eddie G. Robinson Memorial Stadium; Grambling, LA	L 21–58	22,032	
November 5	Southern	Alexander Durley Sports Complex; Houston, TX	L 20–44		
November 12	at UTEP*	Sun Bowl; El Paso, TX	L 0–45	42,784	
November 19	Arkansas–Pine Bluff	Alexander Durley Sports Complex; Houston, TX	L 23–40		
November 25	Prairie View A&M	Reliant Stadium; Houston, TX (rivalry)	L 27–30		
*Non-conference game; Rankings from The Sports Network Poll released prior to the game
