= 2005 Northern Iowa Panthers football team =

American college football season

2005 Northern Iowa Panthers football

Gateway co-champion

NCAA Division I-AA Championship Game, L 16–21 vs. Appalachian State
- Conference: Gateway Football Conference

Ranking
- Sports Network: No. 2
- Record: 11–4 (5–2 Gateway)
- Head coach: Mark Farley (5th season)
- Offensive coordinator: Bill Salmon (5th season)
- Home stadium: UNI-Dome

2005 Gateway Football Conference standings
	Conf.			Overall
Team	W		L	W		L
No. 2 Northern Iowa +^	5	–	2	11	–	4
No. 7 Southern Illinois +^	5	–	2	9	–	4
No. 14 Youngstown State +	5	–	2	8	–	3
No. 22 Illinois State	4	–	3	7	–	4
Western Kentucky	4	–	3	6	–	5
Western Illinois	3	–	4	5	–	6
Missouri State	2	–	5	4	–	6
Indiana State	0	–	7	0	–	11
+ – Conference co-champions; ^ – NCAA Division I-AA playoff participant; Rankings from The Sports Network poll

The 2005 Northern Iowa Panthers football team was an American football team that represented the University of Northern Iowa as a member of the Gateway Football Conference (Gateway Conference) during the 2005 NCAA Division I-AA football season. In its fifth year under head coach Mark Farley, the team compiled an 11–4 record (5–2 in conference games), outscored opponents by a total of 449 to 357, and tied with Southern Illinois and Youngstown State for the Gateway Conference championship. Northern Iowa advanced to the NCAA Division I-AA Football Championship playoffs, where the Panthers defeated Eastern Washington in the first round, New Hampshire in the quarterfinals, and Texas State in the seminfinals before losing to Appalachian State in the NCAA Division I-AA Championship Game. The team set a school record (still standing as of 2026) with 631 yards of total offense against New Hampshire. Farley was selected by Football Gazette as its Northwest region coach of the year.

Defensive back Tanner Varner was selected by Football Gazette as a first-team player on the 2005 Division I-AA All-America team. Three Northern Iowa players were selected as first-team players on the 2005 all-Gateway Conference football team: linebacker Darin Heideman; defensive lineman John Hermann; and offensive lineman Chad Rinehart. Four others, including Varner, were named to the second team. Quarterback Eric Sanders completed 213 of 312 passes and set a sophomore school record with 2,929 passing yards. Hermann had 15 sacks and 20.5 tackles for loss. David Horne led the team with 114 points and 19 touchdowns (17 rushing, 2 receiving).

The team played its home games at the UNI-Dome in Cedar Falls, Iowa.

== Schedule ==
Date	Time	Opponent	Rank	Site	TV	Result	Attendance	Source
September 1	7:05 pm	Drake*	No. 12	UNI-Dome; Cedar Falls, IA	KFXA, KDSM	W 52–17	10,385	
September 10	7:05 pm	Minnesota Duluth*	No. 12	UNI-Dome; Cedar Falls, IA		W 49–14	8,893	
September 17	2:30 pm	at No. 22 (I-A) Iowa*	No. 9	Kinnick Stadium; Iowa City, IA	ESPN Plus	L 21–45	70,585	
October 1	1:05 pm	at Western Illinois	No. 8	Hanson Field; Macomb, IL		W 41–24	14,603	
October 8	2:00 pm	at Missouri State	No. 7	Plaster Sports Complex; Springfield, MO		L 21–24	10,778	
October 15	4:05 pm	Indiana State^{†}	No. 14	UNI-Dome; Cedar Falls, IA		W 31–10	12,449	
October 22	1:30 pm	at Illinois State	No. 13	Hancock Stadium; Normal, IL		L 3–38	12,626	
October 29	3:05 pm	No. 11 Youngstown State	No. 21	UNI-Dome; Cedar Falls, IA	KFXA, KDSM, FCS	W 21–7	11,242	
November 5	4:05 pm	at No. 6 Western Kentucky	No. 17	L. T. Smith Stadium; Bowling Green, KY	FSNM	W 23–20 ^{2OT}	12,364	
November 12	5:05 pm	No. 4 Southern Illinois	No. 14	UNI-Dome; Cedar Falls, IA		W 25–24	15,536	
November 19	5:05 pm	Northern Arizona*	No. 10	UNI-Dome; Cedar Falls, IA		W 41–17	8,142	
November 26	7:05 pm	No. 15 Eastern Washington*	No. 7	UNI-Dome; Cedar Falls, IA (NCAA Division I-AA First Round)		W 41–38	7,746	
December 3	10:00 am	at No. 1 New Hampshire*	No. 7	Cowell Stadium; Durham, NH (NCAA Division Quarterfinal)	ESPNGP	W 24–21	8,448	
December 9	7:05 pm	at No. 4 Texas State*	No. 7	Bobcat Stadium; San Marcos, TX (NCAA Division Semifinal)	ESPN2	W 40–37 ^{OT}	15,712	
December 16	7:00 pm	vs. No. 5 Appalachian State*	No. 7	Finley Stadium; Chattanooga, TN (NCAA Division I-AA Championship Game)	ESPN2	L 16–21	20,236	
*Non-conference game; ^{†}Homecoming; Rankings from The Sports Network Poll released prior to the game; All times are in Central time

== Rankings ==
Ranking movements Legend: ██ Increase in ranking ██ Decrease in ranking
	Week													
Poll	Pre	1	2	3	4	5	6	7	8	9	10	11	12	Final
The Sports Network	12	12	9	10	8	7	14	13	21	17	14	10	7	2

== Personnel ==
=== Coaching staff ===
Name	Position	Year at Northern Iowa	Alma mater (year)
Mark Farley	Head coach	5th	Northern Iowa (1987)

=== Roster ===
2005 Northern Iowa Panthers football team roster
Players
Coaches
Offense

Pos.	#	Name	Class
QB	8	Nick Nelson	Fr
OT	77	Chad Rinehart	So

Defense

Pos.	#	Name	Class

Special teams

Pos.	#	Name	Class

Head coach

- Mark Farley

Coordinators/assistant coaches

Legend

- (C) Team captain
- (S) Suspended
- (I) Ineligible
- Injured
- Redshirt

Roster
