= 2005 Alcorn State Braves football team =

American college football season

2005 Alcorn State Braves football
- Conference: Southwestern Athletic Conference
- East Division
- Record: 6–5 (5–4 SWAC)
- Head coach: Johnny Thomas (8th season)
- Offensive coordinator: John McKenzie (6th season)
- Home stadium: Jack Spinks Stadium

2005 Southwestern Athletic Conference football standings
	Conf.			Overall
Team	W		L	W		L
East Division
Alabama A&M xy	7	–	2	9	–	3
Alabama State	6	–	3	6	–	5
Mississippi Valley State	5	–	4	6	–	5
Alcorn State	5	–	4	6	–	5
Jackson State	2	–	7	2	–	9
West Division
No. 11 Grambling State xy$	9	–	0	11	–	1
Southern	4	–	5	4	–	5
Prairie View A&M	3	–	6	5	–	6
Arkansas–Pine Bluff	3	–	6	3	–	8
Texas Southern	1	–	8	1	–	10
Championship: Grambling State 45, Alabama A&M 6
$ – Conference champion; x – Division champion/co-champions; y – Championship game participant; Rankings from The Sports Network Poll

The 2005 Alcorn State Braves football team represented Alcorn State University as a member of the Southwestern Athletic Conference (SWAC) during the 2005 NCAA Division I-AA football season. Led by eighth-year head coach Johnny Thomas, the Braves compiled an overall record of 6–5, with a conference record of 5–4, and finished tied for third in the SWAC East Division.

== Schedule ==
Date	Opponent	Site	Result	Attendance	Source
September 10	at Southeastern Louisiana*	Strawberry Stadium; Hammond, LA	L 21–48	7,823	
September 17	Langston*	Jack Spinks Stadium; Lorman, MS	W 24–7		
September 24	at Alabama State	Cramton Bowl; Montgomery, AL	L 3–38	10,581	
October 1	Arkansas–Pine Bluff	Jack Spinks Stadium; Lorman, MS	L 7–17		
October 8	Prairie View A&M	Jack Spinks Stadium; Lorman, MS	W 22–10		
October 15	at Texas Southern	Alexander Durley Sports Complex; Houston, TX	W 29–22		
October 22	at Southern	A. W. Mumford Stadium; Baton Rouge, LA	W 38–16		
November 5	Mississippi Valley State	Jack Spinks Stadium; Lorman, MS	W 38–36		
November 12	Alabama A&M	Jack Spinks Stadium; Lorman, MS	L 21–28		
November 19	at Jackson State	Mississippi Veterans Memorial Stadium; Jackson, MS (Soul Bowl)	W 31–14	25,473	
December 3	No. 11 Grambling State	Jack Spinks Stadium; Lorman, MS	L 19–46		
*Non-conference game; Rankings from The Sports Network Poll released prior to the game
