= 2006 Nicholls State Colonels football team =

American college football season

2006 Nicholls State Colonels football
- Conference: Southland Conference
- Record: 4–7 (2–4 Southland)
- Head coach: Jay Thomas (3rd season)
- Offensive coordinator: H. T. Kinney (3rd season)
- Offensive scheme: Spread option
- Defensive coordinator: Steve Ellis (1st season)
- Base defense: Multiple 4–3
- Home stadium: John L. Guidry Stadium

2006 Southland Conference football standings
	Conf.			Overall
Team	W		L	W		L
No. 21 McNeese State $^	5	–	1	7	–	5
Sam Houston State	4	–	2	6	–	5
Stephen F. Austin	4	–	2	4	–	7
Texas State	3	–	3	5	–	6
Nicholls State	2	–	4	4	–	7
Northwestern State	2	–	4	4	–	7
Southeastern Louisiana	1	–	5	2	–	9
$ – Conference champion; ^ – FCS playoff participant; Rankings from The Sports Network poll

The 2006 Nicholls State Colonels football team represented Nicholls State University as a member of the Southland Conference during the 2006 NCAA Division I FCS football season. Led by third-year head Jay Thomas, the Colonels compiled an overall record of 4–7 with a mark of 2–4 in conference play, tying for fifth place in the Southland. Nicholls State played home games at John L. Guidry Stadium in Thibodaux, Louisiana.

== Schedule ==
Date	Time	Opponent	Site	Result	Attendance	Source
August 31	6:00 p.m.	Southern Arkansas*	John L. Guidry Stadium; Thibodaux, LA	W 35–0	6,735	
September 9	12:30 p.m.	at No. 21 Nebraska*	Memorial Stadium; Lincoln, NE	L 7–56	84,076	
September 16	6:00 p.m.	at Louisiana Tech*	Joe Aillet Stadium; Ruston, LA	L 21–31	18,765	
September 23	2:00 p.m.	South Dakota State*	John L. Guidry Stadium; Thibodaux, LA	L 17–24	4,899	
October 7	6:30 p.m.	Southeastern Louisiana	John L. Guidry Stadium; Thibodaux, LA (River Bell Classic)	W 14–10	8,411	
October 14	2:00 p.m.	at Sam Houston State	Bowers Stadium; Huntsville, TX	L 7–37	10,037	
October 21	2:00 p.m.	Northwestern State	John L. Guidry Stadium; Thibodaux, LA (NSU Challenge)	L 0–9	1,013	
October 28	2:00 p.m.	Assumption*	John L. Guidry Stadium; Thibodaux, LA	W 44–0	3,814	
November 4	7:00 p.m.	at Texas State	Bobcat Stadium; San Marcos, TX (Battle for the Paddle)	W 21–19	9,782	
November 11	2:00 p.m.	Stephen F. Austin	John L. Guidry Stadium; Thibodaux, LA	L 13–16	2,567	
November 18	7:00 p.m.	at McNeese State	Cowboy Stadium; Lake Charles, LA	L 10–26	11,842	
*Non-conference game; Rankings from AP Poll released prior to the game; All times are in Central time
