= 2005 Prairie View A&M Panthers football team =

American college football season

2005 Prairie View A&M Panthers football
- Conference: Southwestern Athletic Conference
- West Division
- Record: 5–6 (3–6 SWAC)
- Head coach: Henry Frazier III (2nd season)
- Home stadium: Edward L. Blackshear Field

2005 Southwestern Athletic Conference football standings
	Conf.			Overall
Team	W		L	W		L
East Division
Alabama A&M xy	7	–	2	9	–	3
Alabama State	6	–	3	6	–	5
Mississippi Valley State	5	–	4	6	–	5
Alcorn State	5	–	4	6	–	5
Jackson State	2	–	7	2	–	9
West Division
No. 11 Grambling State xy$	9	–	0	11	–	1
Southern	4	–	5	4	–	5
Prairie View A&M	3	–	6	5	–	6
Arkansas–Pine Bluff	3	–	6	3	–	8
Texas Southern	1	–	8	1	–	10
Championship: Grambling State 45, Alabama A&M 6
$ – Conference champion; x – Division champion/co-champions; y – Championship game participant; Rankings from The Sports Network Poll

The 2005 Prairie View A&M Panthers football team represented Prairie View A&M University as a member of the Southwestern Athletic Conference (SWAC) during the 2005 NCAA Division I-AA football season. Led by second-year head coach Henry Frazier III, the Panthers compiled an overall record of 5–6, with a mark of 3–6 in conference play, and finished tied for third in the SWAC West Division.

== Schedule ==
Date	Opponent	Site	Result	Attendance	Source
September 10	Paul Quinn*	Edward L. Blackshear Field; Prairie View, TX	W 39–12		
September 17	at Southern	A. W. Mumford Stadium; Baton Rouge, LA	L 0–38		
October 1	vs. Grambling State	Cotton Bowl; Dallas, TX (State Fair Classic)	L 7–50	27,949	
October 8	at Alcorn State	Jack Spinks Stadium; Lorman, MS	L 10–22		
October 15	at Alabama State	Cramton Bowl; Montgomery, AL	L 13–34	6,036	
October 22	at Lincoln (MO)*	Dwight T. Reed Stadium; Jefferson City, MO	W 40–8		
October 29	Mississippi Valley State	Edward L. Blackshear Field; Prairie View, TX	L 13–58		
November 5	at Arkansas–Pine Bluff	Golden Lion Stadium; Pine Bluff, AR	W 34–7		
November 12	Jackson State	Edward L. Blackshear Field; Prairie View, TX	W 27–9	2,987	
November 20	Alabama A&M	Edward L. Blackshear Field; Prairie View, TX	L 16–31		
November 25	at Texas Southern	Reliant Stadium; Houston, TX (Labor Day Classic)	W 30–27		
*Non-conference game
