= 2005 Youngstown State Penguins football team =

American college football season

2005 Youngstown State Penguins football

Gateway champion
- Conference: Gateway Football Conference

Ranking
- Sports Network: No. 14
- Record: 8–3 (5–2 Gateway)
- Head coach: Jon Heacock (5th season)
- Home stadium: Stambaugh Stadium

2005 Gateway Football Conference standings
	Conf.			Overall
Team	W		L	W		L
No. 2 Northern Iowa +^	5	–	2	11	–	4
No. 7 Southern Illinois +^	5	–	2	9	–	4
No. 14 Youngstown State +	5	–	2	8	–	3
No. 22 Illinois State	4	–	3	7	–	4
Western Kentucky	4	–	3	6	–	5
Western Illinois	3	–	4	5	–	6
Missouri State	2	–	5	4	–	6
Indiana State	0	–	7	0	–	11
+ – Conference co-champions; ^ – NCAA Division I-AA playoff participant; Rankings from The Sports Network poll

The 2005 Youngstown State Penguins football team represented Youngstown State University in the 2005 NCAA Division I-AA football season. The team was led by fifth-year head coach Jon Heacock and played its home games at Stambaugh Stadium in Youngstown, Ohio. The Penguins finished the season with an 8–3 record overall and a 5–2 record in Gateway Football Conference games, placing them in a three-way tie with Northern Iowa and Southern Illinois for the conference championship. The team was ranked No. 14 in The Sports Network's postseason poll of Division I-AA.

== Schedule ==
Date	Opponent	Rank	Site	Result	Attendance	Source
September 1	Slippery Rock*		Stambaugh Stadium; Youngstown, OH	W 44–14	14,506	
September 10	Northeastern*		Stambaugh Stadium; Youngstown, OH	W 35–16	14,893	
September 17	at Liberty*		Williams Stadium; Lynchburg, VA	W 42–0	5,479	
September 24	at Pittsburgh*		Heinz Field; Pittsburgh, PA	L 0–41	43,135	
October 1	Illinois State		Stambaugh Stadium; Youngstown, OH	W 20–17	16,809	
October 8	at Indiana State	No. 22	Memorial Stadium; Terre Haute, IN	W 45–0	2,310	
October 15	Western Illinois	No. 17	Stambaugh Stadium; Youngstown, OH	W 23–21	11,909	
October 22	Missouri State^{†}	No. 15	Stambaugh Stadium; Youngstown, OH	W 31–7	16,438	
October 29	at No. 21 Northern Iowa	No. 11	UNI-Dome; Cedar Falls, IA	L 7–21	11,242	
November 5	at No. 5 Southern Illinois	No. 15	McAndrew Stadium; Carbondale, IL	L 17–31	8,017	
November 12	No. 12 Western Kentucky	No. 19	Stambaugh Stadium; Youngstown, OH	W 42–10	12,706	
*Non-conference game; ^{†}Homecoming; Rankings from The Sports Network Poll released prior to the game
