= 2005 Sam Houston State Bearkats football team =

American college football season

2005 Sam Houston State Bearkats football
- Conference: Southland Conference
- Record: 3–7 (2–4 Southland)
- Head coach: Todd Whitten (1st season)
- Home stadium: Bowers Stadium

2005 Southland Conference football standings
	Conf.			Overall
Team	W		L	W		L
No. 4 Texas State +^	5	–	1	11	–	3
No. 17 Nicholls State +^	5	–	1	6	–	4
McNeese State	3	–	3	5	–	4
Northwestern State	3	–	3	5	–	5
Southeastern Louisiana	2	–	4	4	–	6
Sam Houston State	2	–	4	3	–	7
Stephen F. Austin	1	–	5	5	–	6
+ – Conference co-champions; ^ – NCAA Division I-AA playoff participant; Rankings from The Sports Network poll

The 2005 Sam Houston State Bearkats football team represented Sam Houston State University as a member of the Southland Conference during the 2005 NCAA Division I-AA football season. Led by first-year head coach Todd Whitten, the Bearkats compiled an overall record of 3–7 with a mark of 2–4 in conference play, and finished tied for fifth in the Southland.

== Schedule ==
Date	Opponent	Site	Result	Attendance	Source
September 1	Bacone*	Bowers Stadium; Huntsville, TX	W 77–7	8,177	
September 10	at Houston*	Robertson Stadium; Houston, TX	L 10–31	15,649	
September 17	at No. 19 (I-A) Texas Tech*	Jones SBC Stadium; Lubbock, TX	L 21–80	50,171	
September 24	Missouri State*	Bowers Stadium; Huntsville, TX	Canceled		
October 8	No. 23 Northwestern State	Bowers Stadium; Huntsville, TX	L 6–10	10,610	
October 15	at Nicholls State	John L. Guidry Stadium; Thibodaux, LA	L 17–37	7,150	
October 20	Stephen F. Austin	Bowers Stadium; Huntsville, TX (Battle of the Piney Woods)	W 52–24	11,052	
October 29	at McNeese State	Cowboy Stadium; Lake Charles, LA	L 26–31	9,646	
November 5	Southeastern Louisiana	Bowers Stadium; Huntsville, TX	W 35–18	7,235	
November 12	at Northern Colorado*	Nottingham Field; Greeley, CO	L 3–24	5,407	
November 19	at No. 5 Texas State	Bobcat Stadium; San Marcos, TX (rivalry)	L 23–26 ^{OT}	15,288	
*Non-conference game; Rankings from The Sports Network Poll released prior to the game
