= 2005 Stephen F. Austin Lumberjacks football team =

American college football season

2005 Stephen F. Austin Lumberjacks football
- Conference: Southland Conference
- Record: 5–6 (1–5 Southland)
- Head coach: Robert McFarland (1st season)
- Defensive coordinator: J. C. Harper (1st season)
- Home stadium: Homer Bryce Stadium

2005 Southland Conference football standings
	Conf.			Overall
Team	W		L	W		L
No. 4 Texas State +^	5	–	1	11	–	3
No. 17 Nicholls State +^	5	–	1	6	–	4
McNeese State	3	–	3	5	–	4
Northwestern State	3	–	3	5	–	5
Southeastern Louisiana	2	–	4	4	–	6
Sam Houston State	2	–	4	3	–	7
Stephen F. Austin	1	–	5	5	–	6
+ – Conference co-champions; ^ – NCAA Division I-AA playoff participant; Rankings from The Sports Network poll

The 2005 Stephen F. Austin Lumberjacks football team represented Stephen F. Austin State University as a member of the Southland Conference during the 2005 NCAA Division I-AA football season. Led by first-year head coach Robert McFarland, the Lumberjacks compiled an overall record of 5–6 with a mark of 1–5 in conference play, placing in last place in the Southland. Stephen F. Austin played home games at Homer Bryce Stadium in Nacogdoches, Texas.

== Schedule ==
Date	Time	Opponent	Site	Result	Attendance	Source
September 1	7:00 p.m.	Henderson State*	Homer Bryce Stadium; Nacogdoches, TX	W 49–38	8,475	
September 10	2:05 p.m.	at No. 16 Montana State*	Bobcat Stadium; Bozeman, MT	L 6–42	13,327	
September 17	7:00 p.m.	Western Illinois*	Homer Bryce Stadium; Nacogdoches, TX	W 63–36	9,675	
September 24	6:00 p.m.	at Southern Utah*	Eccles Coliseum; Cedar City, UT	W 40–17	6,849	
October 8	2:00 p.m.	Nicholls State	Homer Bryce Stadium; Nacogdoches, TX	W 27–21 ^{OT}	7,485	
October 15	4:00 p.m.	vs. McNeese State	Cajun Field; Lafayette, LA (Note: The game against McNeese State originally scheduled to be played at Cowboy Stadium, the game was played at Lafayette due to on-going recovery efforts in the wake of Hurricane Rita in Lake Charles.)	L 23–33	6,219	
October 20	7:00 p.m.	at Sam Houston State	Bowers Stadium; Huntsville, TX (Battle of the Piney Woods)	L 24–52	11,052	
October 29	2:00 p.m.	Southeastern Louisiana	Homer Bryce Stadium; Nacogdoches, TX	L 23–45	9,867	
November 5	4:00 p.m.	No. 21 UC Davis*	Homer Bryce Stadium; Nacogdoches, TX	W 27–17	6,549	
November 12	1:00 p.m.	No. 7 Texas State	Homer Bryce Stadium; Nacogdoches, TX	L 21–38	8,779	
November 17	6:30 p.m.	at Northwestern State	Harry Turpin Stadium; Natchitoches, LA (Chief Caddo)	L 21–41	3,872	
*Non-conference game; Rankings from The Sports Network Poll released prior to the game; All times are in Central time
