= 2006 Northwestern State Demons football team =

American college football season

2006 Northwestern State Demons football
- Conference: Southland Conference
- Record: 4–7 (2–4 Southland)
- Head coach: Scott Stoker (5th season)
- Offensive coordinator: Slade Nagle (1st season)
- Co-offensive coordinator: Broderick Fobbs (2nd season)
- Home stadium: Harry Turpin Stadium

2006 Southland Conference football standings
	Conf.			Overall
Team	W		L	W		L
No. 21 McNeese State $^	5	–	1	7	–	5
Sam Houston State	4	–	2	6	–	5
Stephen F. Austin	4	–	2	4	–	7
Texas State	3	–	3	5	–	6
Nicholls State	2	–	4	4	–	7
Northwestern State	2	–	4	4	–	7
Southeastern Louisiana	1	–	5	2	–	9
$ – Conference champion; ^ – FCS playoff participant; Rankings from The Sports Network poll

The 2006 Northwestern State Demons football team represented Northwestern State University as a member of the Southland Conference during the 2006 NCAA Division I FCS football season. Led by fifth-year head coach Scott Stoker, the Demons compiled an overall record of 4–7 with a mark of 2–4 in conference play, tying for fifth place in the Southland. Northwestern State played home games at Harry Turpin Stadium in Natchitoches, Louisiana.

== Schedule ==
Date	Time	Opponent	Site	TV	Result	Attendance	Source
September 2	6:00 pm	at Kansas*	Memorial Stadium; Lawrence, KS		L 18–49	44,025	
September 9	6:00 pm	at Baylor*	Floyd Casey Stadium; Waco, Texas		L 10–47	31,125	
September 16	6:00 pm	Delaware State*	Harry Turpin Stadium; Natchitoches, LA		W 23–3	10,215	
September 30	6:00 pm	Arkansas–Monticello*	Harry Turpin Stadium; Natchitoches, LA		W 20–3	6,903	
October 7	7:00 pm	Sam Houston State	Harry Turpin Stadium; Natchitoches, LA		L 20–30	7,152	
October 14	6:00 pm	at Southeastern Louisiana	Strawberry Stadium; Hammond, LA (rivalry)		L 24–31 ^{OT}	6,453	
October 21	2:00 pm	at Nicholls State	John L. Guidry Stadium; Thibodaux, LA (NSU Challenge)		W 9–0	1,013	
October 28	2:00 pm	Texas State	Harry Turpin Stadium; Natchitoches, LA	TSAA	W 19–10	9,815	
November 4	1:00 pm	at Ole Miss*	Vaught–Hemingway Stadium; Oxford, MS		L 7–27	47,712	
November 11	6:00 pm	McNeese State	Harry Turpin Stadium; Natchitoches, LA (rivalry)	SCTN	L 26–29 ^{OT}	11,218	
November 16	7:00 pm	at Stephen F. Austin	Homer Bryce Stadium; Nacogdoches, TX (Chief Caddo)		L 11–20	6,432	
*Non-conference game; All times are in Central time
