= 2005 Missouri State Bears football team =

American college football season

2005 Missouri State Bears football
- Conference: Gateway Football Conference
- Record: 4–6 (2–5 GFC)
- Head coach: Randy Ball (7th season)
- Offensive coordinator: Dennis Darnell (2nd season)
- Defensive coordinator: Deion Melvin (7th season)
- Captains: A. J. Porter; Steve Kohenskey; Sid Rone; Kevin Sears; Jon Scifres
- Home stadium: Plaster Sports Complex

2005 Gateway Football Conference standings
	Conf.			Overall
Team	W		L	W		L
No. 2 Northern Iowa +^	5	–	2	11	–	4
No. 7 Southern Illinois +^	5	–	2	9	–	4
No. 14 Youngstown State +	5	–	2	8	–	3
No. 22 Illinois State	4	–	3	7	–	4
Western Kentucky	4	–	3	6	–	5
Western Illinois	3	–	4	5	–	6
Missouri State	2	–	5	4	–	6
Indiana State	0	–	7	0	–	11
+ – Conference co-champions; ^ – NCAA Division I-AA playoff participant; Rankings from The Sports Network poll

The 2005 Missouri State Bears football team represented Missouri State University as a member of the Gateway Football Conference (GFC) during the 2005 NCAA Division I-AA football season. Led by seventh-year head coach Randy Ball, the Bears compiled an overall record of 4–6, with a mark of 2–5 in conference play, and finished seventh in the GFC.

== Schedule ==
Date	Opponent	Site	Result	Attendance	Source
September 3	at Arkansas*	Donald W. Reynolds Razorback Stadium; Fayetteville, AR	L 17–49	66,424	
September 10	Quincy (IL)*	Plaster Sports Complex; Springfield, MO	W 51–14	10,789	
September 17	Southeast Missouri State*	Plaster Sports Complex; Springfield, MO	W 45–21	11,555	
September 24	at Sam Houston State*	Bowers Stadium; Huntsville, TX	Canceled		
October 1	at No. 2 Southern Illinois	McAndrew Stadium; Carbondale, IL	L 23–30 ^{OT}	13,140	
October 8	No. 7 Northern Iowa	Plaster Sports Complex; Springfield, MO	W 24–21	10,778	
October 15	at No. 3 Western Kentucky	L. T. Smith Stadium; Bowling Green, KY	L 28–37	13,105	
October 22	at No. 14 Youngstown State	Stambaugh Stadium; Youngstown, OH	L 7–31		
October 29	Indiana State	Plaster Sports Complex; Springfield, MO	W 31–27		
November 5	Illinois State	Plaster Sports Complex; Springfield, MO	L 23–48	7,155	
November 12	at Western Illinois	Hanson Field; Macomb, IL	L 24–34	6,128	
*Non-conference game; Rankings from The Sports Network Poll released prior to the game
