= 2006 Sam Houston State Bearkats football team =

American college football season

2006 Sam Houston State Bearkats football
- Conference: Southland Conference
- Record: 6–5 (4–2 Southland)
- Head coach: Todd Whitten (2nd season)
- Home stadium: Bowers Stadium

2006 Southland Conference football standings
| | Conf. | | | Overall |
| Team | W | | L | W | | L |
|---|---|---|---|---|---|---|
| No. 21 McNeese State $^ | 5 | – | 1 | 7 | – | 5 |
| Sam Houston State | 4 | – | 2 | 6 | – | 5 |
| Stephen F. Austin | 4 | – | 2 | 4 | – | 7 |
| Texas State | 3 | – | 3 | 5 | – | 6 |
| Nicholls State | 2 | – | 4 | 4 | – | 7 |
| Northwestern State | 2 | – | 4 | 4 | – | 7 |
| Southeastern Louisiana | 1 | – | 5 | 2 | – | 9 |
$ – Conference champion; ^ – FCS playoff participant; Rankings from The Sports Network poll

The 2006 Sam Houston State Bearkats football team represented Sam Houston State University as a member of the Southland Conference during the 2006 NCAA Division I FCS football season. Led by second-year head coach Todd Whitten, the Bearkats compiled an overall record of 6–5 with a mark of 4–2 in conference play, and finished tied for second in the Southland.

== Schedule ==
| Date | Opponent | Site | Result | Attendance | Source |
|---|---|---|---|---|---|
| September 9 | Arkansas–Monticello* | Bowers Stadium; Huntsville, TX | W 41–3 | 10,041 | |
| September 16 | at SMU* | Gerald J. Ford Stadium; University Park, TX | L 14–45 | 17,421 | |
| September 23 | at Missouri State* | Plaster Sports Complex; Springfield, MO | W 20–17 | 10,490 | |
| September 30 | at No. 7 (FBS) Texas* | Darrell K Royal–Texas Memorial Stadium; Austin, TX | L 3–56 | 88,913 | |
| October 7 | at Northwestern State | Harry Turpin Stadium; Natchitoches, LA | W 30–20 | 7,152 | |
| October 14 | Nicholls State | Bowers Stadium; Huntsville, TX | W 37–7 | 10,037 | |
| October 19 | Central Arkansas* | Bowers Stadium; Huntsville, TX | L 30–38 | 7,130 | |
| October 28 | McNeese State | Bowers Stadium; Huntsville, TX | L 18–31 | 10,018 | |
| November 4 | at Stephen F. Austin | Homer Bryce Stadium; Nacogdoches, TX (Battle of the Piney Woods) | W 21–17 | 9,634 | |
| November 11 | at Southeastern Louisiana | Strawberry Stadium; Hammond, LA | W 28–23 | 5,125 | |
| November 18 | Texas State | Bowers Stadium; Huntsville, TX (rivalry) | L 21–28 | 10,121 | |
*Non-conference game; Rankings from The Sports Network Poll released prior to the game
