= 2006 Stephen F. Austin Lumberjacks football team =

American college football season

2006 Stephen F. Austin Lumberjacks football
- Conference: Southland Conference
- Record: 4–7 (4–3 Southland)
- Head coach: Robert McFarland (2nd season)
- Defensive coordinator: J. C. Harper (2nd season)
- Home stadium: Homer Bryce Stadium

2006 Southland Conference football standings
	Conf.			Overall
Team	W		L	W		L
No. 21 McNeese State $^	5	–	1	7	–	5
Sam Houston State	4	–	2	6	–	5
Stephen F. Austin	4	–	2	4	–	7
Texas State	3	–	3	5	–	6
Nicholls State	2	–	4	4	–	7
Northwestern State	2	–	4	4	–	7
Southeastern Louisiana	1	–	5	2	–	9
$ – Conference champion; ^ – FCS playoff participant; Rankings from The Sports Network poll

The 2006 Stephen F. Austin Lumberjacks football team represented Stephen F. Austin State University as a member of the Southland Conference during the 2006 NCAA Division I FCS football season. Led by second-year head coach Robert McFarland, the Lumberjacks compiled an overall record of 4–7 with a mark of 4–2 in conference play, tying for second place in the Southland. Stephen F. Austin played home games at Homer Bryce Stadium in Nacogdoches, Texas.

== Schedule ==
Date	Time	Opponent	Site	TV	Result	Attendance	Source
August 31	6:00 p.m.	at Tulsa*	Skelly Stadium; Tulsa, OK		L 7–45	23,308	
September 9	6:00 p.m.	Delta State*	Homer Bryce Stadium; Nacogdoches, TX		L 14–17	7,634	
September 16	8:00 p.m.	at Arizona*	Arizona Stadium; Tucson, AZ	FSNAZ	L 10–28	47,402	
September 23	6:00 p.m.	Central Arkansas	Homer Bryce Stadium; Nacogdoches, TX		L 35–37	6,312	
September 30	6:00 p.m.	No. 11 North Dakota State*	Homer Bryce Stadium; Nacogdoches, TX		L 9–17	7,349	
October 7	6:00 p.m.	at Texas State	Bobcat Stadium; San Marcos, TX		W 24–13	13,482	
October 21	2:00 p.m.	McNeese State	Homer Bryce Stadium; Nacogdoches, TX		L 17–20	8,754	
October 28	7:00 p.m.	at Southeastern Louisiana	Strawberry Stadium; Hammond, LA		W 35–10	6,428	
November 4	6:00 p.m.	Sam Houston State	Homer Bryce Stadium; Nacogdoches, TX (Battle of the Piney Woods)		L 17–21	9,634	
November 11	2:00 p.m.	at Nicholls State	John L. Guidry Stadium; Thibodaux, LA		W 16–13	2,567	
November 16	7:00 p.m.	Northwestern State	Homer Bryce Stadium; Nacogdoches, TX (Chief Caddo)		W 20–11	6,432	
*Non-conference game; Rankings from The Sports Network Poll released prior to the game; All times are in Central time
