= Dennis Roland (American football coach) =

American football coach (1956–2008)

Biographical details
- Born: May 19, 1956; Dodge County, Georgia, U.S.
- Died: January 1, 2008 (aged 51); Cumming, Georgia, U.S.

Playing career
- 1974–1975: Lees–McRae
- 1977–1978: Boston University
- Position: Offensive tackle

Coaching career (HC unless noted)
- 1977: Boston University (SA)
- 1979: Lees–McRae (assistant)
- 1980–1982: Liberty (DL)
- 1983–1985: UTEP (assistant)
- 1986–1990: Olivet Nazarene
- 1991–1992: Bleckley County HS (GA)
- 1993–1997: Middle Georgia
- 1998–2000: Southwest Baptist
- 2001 (spring): Kentucky (TE/RC)
- 2001–2002: Belhaven
- 2003: Southeastern Louisiana (AHC/OL)
- 2004: North Gwinnett HS (GA)
- 2005–2006: Southeastern Louisiana
- 2007: Central Gwinnett HS (GA)

Administrative career (AD unless noted)
- 2004–2005: North Gwinnett HS (GA)
- 2007: Southeastern Louisiana (interim AD)

Head coaching record
- Overall: 47–80 (college); 25–17 (high school)

Dennis F. Roland (May 19, 1956 – January 1, 2008) was an American football coach. He served as the head football coach at Olivet Nazarene University (1986–1990), Southwest Baptist University (1998–2000), Belhaven University (2001–2002), and Southeastern Louisiana University (2005–2006), compiling a career college football record of 47–80. Roland died on January 1, 2008, from non-Hodgkin lymphoma.

== Early life and education ==
Roland was born in Dodge County, Georgia. He graduated from high school in Cochran, Georgia, in 1974. He later graduated from Lees–McRae College and Boston University, and earned a master's degree from Lynchburg College—now known as University of Lynchburg.

== Coaching career ==
=== Belhaven ===
Roland was the second head football coach at Belhaven College in Jackson, Mississippi and he held that position for two seasons, from 2001 until 2002. His coaching record at Belhaven was 9–12.

=== Southeastern Louisiana ===
Roland's next position was as the 13th head football coach at Southeastern Louisiana University in Hammond, Louisiana and he held that position for two seasons, from 2005 until 2006. His coaching record at Southeastern Louisiana was 6–15.

== Death and family ==
Roland died on January 1, 2008, at Northside Hospital Forsythe in Cumming, Georgia, after suffering from non-Hodgkin lymphoma.

Roland's son, Dennis Jr., played in the National Football League (NFL).

== Head coaching record ==
=== College ===
Year	Team	Overall	Conference	Standing	Bowl/playoffs
Olivet Nazarene Tigers (NAIA Division I independent) (1986–1990)
1986	Olivet Nazarene	2–8			
1987	Olivet Nazarene	5–5			
1988	Olivet Nazarene	5–5			
1989	Olivet Nazarene	6–4			
1990	Olivet Nazarene	7–5			
Olivet Nazarene:		25–27			
Southwest Baptist Bearcats (Mid-America Intercollegiate Athletic Association) (1998–2000)
1998	Southwest Baptist	3–8	2–7	9th	
1999	Southwest Baptist	2–9	2–7	9th	
2000	Southwest Baptist	2–9	1–8	9th	
Southwest Baptist:		7–26	5–22		
Belhaven Blazers (Mid-South Conference) (2001–2002)
2001	Belhaven	4–6	4–3	4th	
2002	Belhaven	5–6	5–4	4th	
Belhaven:		9–12	9–7		
Southeastern Louisiana Lions (Southland Conference) (2005–2006)
2005	Southeastern Louisiana	4–6	2–4	5th	
2006	Southeastern Louisiana	2–9	1–5	7th	
Southeastern Louisiana:		6–15	3–9		
Total:		47–80			

=== High school ===
Year	Team	Overall	Conference	Standing	Bowl/playoffs
Bleckley County Royals (Georgia High School Association) (1991–1992)
1991	Bleckley County	7–3	5–3		
1992	Bleckley County	5–5	3–5		
Bleckley County:		12–8	8–8		
North Gwinnett Bulldogs (Georgia High School Association) (2004)
2004	North Gwinnett	9–3	7–2	3rd	
North Gwinnett:		9–3	7–2		
Central Gwinnett Black Knights (Georgia High School Association) (2007)
2007	Central Gwinnett	4–6	2–5	6th	
Central Gwinnett:		4–6	2–5		
Total:		25–17			
