= 2006 Texas State Bobcats football team =

American college football season

2006 Texas State Bobcats football
- Conference: Southland Conference
- Record: 5–6 (3–3 SLC)
- Head coach: David Bailiff (3rd season)
- Co-offensive coordinators: Blake Miller (5th season); Frank Hernandez (3rd season)
- Offensive scheme: Pro-style
- Defensive coordinator: Craig Naivar (3rd season)
- Base defense: 3–4
- Home stadium: Bobcat Stadium

2006 Southland Conference football standings
	Conf.			Overall
Team	W		L	W		L
No. 21 McNeese State $^	5	–	1	7	–	5
Sam Houston State	4	–	2	6	–	5
Stephen F. Austin	4	–	2	4	–	7
Texas State	3	–	3	5	–	6
Nicholls State	2	–	4	4	–	7
Northwestern State	2	–	4	4	–	7
Southeastern Louisiana	1	–	5	2	–	9
$ – Conference champion; ^ – FCS playoff participant; Rankings from The Sports Network poll

The 2006 Texas State Bobcats football team was an American football team that represented Texas State University–San Marcos (now known as Texas State University) during the 2006 NCAA Division I FCS football season as a member of the Southland Conference (SLC). In their third year under head coach David Bailiff, the team compiled an overall record of 5–6 with a mark of 3–3 in conference play.

== Schedule ==
Date	Opponent	Rank	Site	Result	Attendance	Source
September 2	No. 25 (D-II) Tarleton State*	No. 18	Bobcat Stadium; San Marcos, TX	W 27–23	15,388	
September 9	at Kentucky*	No. 22	Commonwealth Stadium; Lexington, KY	L 7–41	57,136	
September 16	Northern Colorado*	No. 23	Bobcat Stadium; San Marcos, TX	L 13–14	11,870	
September 23	at Southern Utah*		Eccles Coliseum; Cedar City, UT	L 21–30	7,000	
October 7	Stephen F. Austin		Bobcat Stadium; San Marcos, TX	L 13–24	13,482	
October 14	at McNeese State		Cowboy Stadium; Lake Charles, LA	W 27–17	11,640	
October 21	Southeastern Louisiana		Bobcat Stadium; San Marcos, TX	W 38–17	13,321	
October 28	at Northwestern State		Harry Turpin Stadium; Natchitoches, LA	L 10–19	9,815	
November 2	Nicholls State		Bobcat Stadium; San Marcos, TX (rivalry)	L 19–21	9,782	
November 11	Texas Southern*		Bobcat Stadium; San Marcos, TX	W 41–21	12,593	
November 18	at Sam Houston State		Bowers Stadium; Huntsville, TX (rivalry)	W 28–21	10,121	
*Non-conference game; Rankings from The Sports Network Poll released prior to the game
