= 2005 Nicholls State Colonels football team =

American college football season

2005 Nicholls State Colonels football

Southland champion

NCAA Division I-AA First Round, L 12–14 at Furman
- Conference: Southland Conference

Ranking
- Sports Network: No. 17
- Record: 6–4 (5–1 Southland)
- Head coach: Jay Thomas (2nd season)
- Offensive coordinator: H. T. Kinney (2nd season)
- Offensive scheme: Spread option
- Base defense: Multiple 4–3
- Home stadium: John L. Guidry Stadium

2005 Southland Conference football standings
	Conf.			Overall
Team	W		L	W		L
No. 4 Texas State +^	5	–	1	11	–	3
No. 17 Nicholls State +^	5	–	1	6	–	4
McNeese State	3	–	3	5	–	4
Northwestern State	3	–	3	5	–	5
Southeastern Louisiana	2	–	4	4	–	6
Sam Houston State	2	–	4	3	–	7
Stephen F. Austin	1	–	5	5	–	6
+ – Conference co-champions; ^ – NCAA Division I-AA playoff participant; Rankings from The Sports Network poll

The 2005 Nicholls State Colonels football team represented Nicholls State University as a member of the Southland Conference during the 2005 NCAA Division I-AA football season. Led by second-year head Jay Thomas, the Colonels compiled an overall record of 6–4 with a mark of 5–1 in conference play, sharing the Southland title with Texas State. Nicholls State advanced to the NCAA Division I-AA Football Championship playoffs, losing to Furman in the first round. The team played home games at John L. Guidry Stadium in Thibodaux, Louisiana.

== Schedule ==
Date	Time	Opponent	Rank	Site	Result	Attendance	Source
September 10	4:00 p.m.	at Indiana*		Memorial Stadium; Bloomington, IN	L 31–35	27,600	
September 17	2:00 p.m.	Cheyney*		John L. Guidry Stadium; Thibodaux, LA	W 54–0	4,732	
September 24		Western Carolina*		John L. Guidry Stadium; Thibodaux, LA	Cancelled (Note: The Colonels game against Western Carolina was cancelled due to the impacts of Hurricane Rita.)	N/A	
October 1	6:00 p.m.	at No. 13 North Dakota State*		Fargodome; Fargo, ND	L 13–26	14,022	
October 8	2:00 p.m.	at Stephen F. Austin		Homer Bryce Stadium; Nacogdoches, TX	L 21–27 ^{OT}	7,485	
October 15	2:00 p.m.	Sam Houston State		John L. Guidry Stadium; Thibodaux, LA	W 37–17	7,150	
October 29	6:30 p.m.	No. 6 Texas State		John L. Guidry Stadium; Thibodaux, LA (Battle for the Paddle)	W 32–29 ^{OT}	3,865	
November 5	6:00 p.m.	at Northwestern State		Harry Turpin Stadium; Natchitoches, LA (NSU Challenge)	W 31–24	7,368	
November 12	6:00 p.m.	at Southeastern Louisiana	No. 25	Strawberry Stadium; Hammond, LA (River Bell Classic)	W 38–28	9,108	
November 19	2:00 p.m.	McNeese State	No. 25	John L. Guidry Stadium; Thibodaux, LA	W 39–26	6,571	
November 26	11:30 a.m.	at No. 3 Furman*	No. 21	Paladin Stadium; Greenville, SC (NCAA Division I-AA First Round)	L 12–14	4,125	
*Non-conference game; Rankings from The Sports Network Poll released prior to the game; All times are in Central time
