= 2005 Alabama A&M Bulldogs football team =

American college football season

2005 Alabama A&M Bulldogs football

SWAC East Division champion

SWAC Championship Game, L 6–45 vs. Grambling State
- Conference: Southwestern Athletic Conference
- East Division
- Record: 9–3 (7–2 SWAC)
- Head coach: Anthony Jones (4th season)
- Home stadium: Louis Crews Stadium

2005 Southwestern Athletic Conference football standings
	Conf.			Overall
Team	W		L	W		L
East Division
Alabama A&M xy	7	–	2	9	–	3
Alabama State	6	–	3	6	–	5
Mississippi Valley State	5	–	4	6	–	5
Alcorn State	5	–	4	6	–	5
Jackson State	2	–	7	2	–	9
West Division
No. 11 Grambling State xy$	9	–	0	11	–	1
Southern	4	–	5	4	–	5
Prairie View A&M	3	–	6	5	–	6
Arkansas–Pine Bluff	3	–	6	3	–	8
Texas Southern	1	–	8	1	–	10
Championship: Grambling State 45, Alabama A&M 6
$ – Conference champion; x – Division champion/co-champions; y – Championship game participant; Rankings from The Sports Network Poll

The 2005 Alabama A&M Bulldogs football team represented Alabama A&M University as a member of the Southwestern Athletic Conference (SWAC) during the 2005 NCAA Division I-AA football season. Led by fourth-year head coach Anthony Jones, the Bulldogs compiled an overall record of 9–3, with a conference record of 7–2, and finished first in the SWAC East Division.

== Schedule ==
Date	Opponent	Site	Result	Attendance	Source
September 3	at Tennessee State*	the Coliseum; Nashville, TN (John Merritt Classic)	W 27–14	25,342	
September 10	at Grambling State	Eddie G. Robinson Memorial Stadium; Grambling, LA	L 0–44	12,195	
September 17	Mississippi Valley State	Louis Crews Stadium; Normal, AL	W 27–13	7,060	
September 24	Allen*	Louis Crews Stadium; Normal, AL	W 42–0		
October 1	Texas Southern	Louis Crews Stadium; Normal, AL	L 7–17		
October 8	at Southern	A. W. Mumford Stadium; Baton Rouge, LA	W 20–7		
October 22	Arkansas–Pine Bluff	Louis Crews Stadium; Normal, AL	W 28–13		
October 29	vs. No. 24 Alabama State	Legion Field; Birmingham, AL (Magic City Classic)	W 31–28	68,238	
November 5	Jackson State	Louis Crews Stadium; Normal, AL	W 52–6		
November 12	at Alcorn State	Jack Spinks Stadium; Lorman, MS	W 28–21		
November 20	at Prairie View A&M	Edward L. Blackshear Field; Prairie View, TX	W 31–16		
December 10	vs. No. 11 Grambling State	Legion Field; Birmingham, AL (SWAC Championship Game)	L 6–45	20,612	
*Non-conference game; Rankings from The Sports Network Poll released prior to the game
