= 2005 Arkansas–Pine Bluff Golden Lions football team =

American college football season

2005 Arkansas–Pine Bluff Golden Lions football
- Conference: Southwestern Athletic Conference
- West Division
- Record: 3–8 (3–6 SWAC)
- Head coach: Mo Forte (2nd season)
- Home stadium: Golden Lion Stadium

2005 Southwestern Athletic Conference football standings
| | Conf. | | | Overall |
| Team | W | | L | W | | L |
|---|---|---|---|---|---|---|
East Division
| Alabama A&M xy | 7 | – | 2 | 9 | – | 3 |
| Alabama State | 6 | – | 3 | 6 | – | 5 |
| Mississippi Valley State | 5 | – | 4 | 6 | – | 5 |
| Alcorn State | 5 | – | 4 | 6 | – | 5 |
| Jackson State | 2 | – | 7 | 2 | – | 9 |
West Division
| No. 11 Grambling State xy$ | 9 | – | 0 | 11 | – | 1 |
| Southern | 4 | – | 5 | 4 | – | 5 |
| Prairie View A&M | 3 | – | 6 | 5 | – | 6 |
| Arkansas–Pine Bluff | 3 | – | 6 | 3 | – | 8 |
| Texas Southern | 1 | – | 8 | 1 | – | 10 |
Championship: Grambling State 45, Alabama A&M 6
$ – Conference champion; x – Division champion/co-champions; y – Championship game participant; Rankings from The Sports Network Poll

The 2005 Arkansas–Pine Bluff Golden Lions football team represented the University of Arkansas at Pine Bluff as a member of the Southwestern Athletic Conference (SWAC) during the 2005 NCAA Division I-AA football season. Led by second-year head coach Mo Forte, the Golden Lions compiled an overall record of 3–8, with a mark of 3–6 in conference play, and finished second in the SWAC West Division.

== Schedule ==
| Date | Opponent | Site | Result | Attendance | Source |
|---|---|---|---|---|---|
| September 3 | vs. Mississippi Valley State | Soldier Field; Chicago, IL (Chicago Football Classic) | L 17–30 | | |
| September 10 | at Bethune–Cookman* | Daytona Stadium; Daytona Beach, FL | L 17–31 | 5,624 | |
| September 17 | Alabama State | Golden Lion Stadium; Pine Bluff, AR | L 10–41 | 8,313 | |
| September 24 | vs. Tuskegee* | Edward Jones Dome; St. Louis, MO (Gateway Classic) | L 9–13 | | |
| October 1 | at Alcorn State | Jack Spinks Stadium; Lorman, MS | W 17–7 | | |
| October 15 | Grambling State | Golden Lion Stadium; Pine Bluff, AR | L 23–26 | | |
| October 22 | at Alabama A&M | Louis Crews Stadium; Normal, AL | L 13–28 | | |
| October 29 | at Jackson State | Mississippi Veterans Memorial Stadium; Jackson, MS | W 64–36 | 2,831 | |
| November 5 | Prairie View A&M | Golden Lion Stadium; Pine Bluff, AR | L 7–34 | | |
| November 12 | Southern | Golden Lion Stadium; Pine Bluff, AR | L 21–27 | | |
| November 19 | at Texas Southern | Alexander Durley Sports Complex; Houston, TX | W 40–23 | | |
*Non-conference game
