= 2005 Texas State Bobcats football team =

American college football season

2005 Texas State Bobcats football

SLC co-champion

NCAA Division I-AA Semifinal, L 37–40 vs. Northern Iowa
- Conference: Southland Conference

Ranking
- Sports Network: No. 4
- FCS Coaches: No. 4
- Record: 11–3 (5–1 SLC)
- Head coach: David Bailiff (2nd season)
- Co-offensive coordinators: Blake Miller (4th season); Frank Hernandez (2nd season)
- Offensive scheme: Pro-style
- Defensive coordinator: Craig Naivar (2nd season)
- Base defense: 3–4
- Home stadium: Bobcat Stadium

2005 Southland Conference football standings
	Conf.			Overall
Team	W		L	W		L
No. 4 Texas State +^	5	–	1	11	–	3
No. 17 Nicholls State +^	5	–	1	6	–	4
McNeese State	3	–	3	5	–	4
Northwestern State	3	–	3	5	–	5
Southeastern Louisiana	2	–	4	4	–	6
Sam Houston State	2	–	4	3	–	7
Stephen F. Austin	1	–	5	5	–	6
+ – Conference co-champions; ^ – NCAA Division I-AA playoff participant; Rankings from The Sports Network poll

The 2005 Texas State Bobcats football team represented Texas State University–San Marcos as a member of the Southland Conference during the 2005 NCAA Division I-AA football season. The Bobcats were led by second-year head coach David Bailiff and played their home games at Bobcat Stadium in San Marcos, Texas. They finished the season with an overall record of 11–3 and a mark of 5–1 in conference play, sharing the SLC title with Nicholls State. Texas State qualified for the NCAA Division I-AA Football Championship defeating Georgia Southern in the first round and Cal Poly in the second round before falling to Northern Iowa in the semifinals.

== Schedule ==
Date	Opponent	Rank	Site	TV	Result	Attendance	Source
September 3	Delta State*	No. 23	Bobcat Stadium; San Marcos, TX		W 32–25	10,014	
September 10	Southern Utah*	No. 23	Bobcat Stadium; San Marcos, TX		W 34–0	10,002	
September 22	at Texas A&M*	No. 14	Kyle Field; College Station, TX	FSN	L 31–44	75,128	
October 1	South Dakota State*	No. 16	Bobcat Stadium; San Marcos, TX		W 42–12	12,781	
October 8	at Southeastern Louisiana	No. 14	Strawberry Stadium; Hammond, LA		W 30–15	6,374	
October 15	Oklahoma Panhandle State*	No. 10	Bobcat Stadium; San Marcos, TX		W 75–7	13,787	
October 22	No. 22 Northwestern State	No. 7	Bobcat Stadium; San Marcos, TX		W 31–16	13,852	
October 29	at Nicholls State	No. 6	John L. Guidry Stadium; Thibodaux, LA (Battle for the Paddle)		L 29–32 ^{OT}	3,865	
November 5	McNeese State	No. 10	Bobcat Stadium; San Marcos, TX		W 49–7	11,904	
November 12	at Stephen F. Austin	No. 7	Homer Bryce Stadium; Nacogdoches, TX		W 38–21	8,779	
November 19	Sam Houston State	No. 5	Bobcat Stadium; San Marcos, TX (rivalry)		W 26–23 ^{OT}	15,288	
November 26	No. 6 Georgia Southern*	No. 4	Bobcat Stadium; San Marcos, TX (NCAA Division I-AA First Round)	ESPN2	W 50–35	10,000	
December 3	No. 10 Cal Poly*	No. 4	Bobcat Stadium; San Marcos, TX (NCAA Division I-AA Quarterfinal)	ESPN2	W 14–7	15,411	
December 9	No. 7 Northern Iowa*	No. 4	Bobcat Stadium; San Marcos, TX (NCAA Division I-AA Semifinal)	ESPN2	L 37–40 ^{OT}	15,712	
*Non-conference game; Rankings from The Sports Network Poll released prior to the game
