= 2005 Southern Jaguars football team =

American college football season

2005 Southern Jaguars football
- Conference: Southwestern Athletic Conference
- West Division
- Record: 4–5 (4–5 SWAC)
- Head coach: Pete Richardson (13th season)
- Defensive coordinator: Terrence Graves (2nd season)
- Home stadium: A. W. Mumford Stadium

2005 Southwestern Athletic Conference football standings
	Conf.			Overall
Team	W		L	W		L
East Division
Alabama A&M xy	7	–	2	9	–	3
Alabama State	6	–	3	6	–	5
Mississippi Valley State	5	–	4	6	–	5
Alcorn State	5	–	4	6	–	5
Jackson State	2	–	7	2	–	9
West Division
No. 11 Grambling State xy$	9	–	0	11	–	1
Southern	4	–	5	4	–	5
Prairie View A&M	3	–	6	5	–	6
Arkansas–Pine Bluff	3	–	6	3	–	8
Texas Southern	1	–	8	1	–	10
Championship: Grambling State 45, Alabama A&M 6
$ – Conference champion; x – Division champion/co-champions; y – Championship game participant; Rankings from The Sports Network Poll

The 2005 Southern Jaguars football team represented Southern University as a member of the Southwestern Athletic Conference (SWAC) during the 2005 NCAA Division I-AA football season. Led by 13th-year head coach Pete Richardson, the Jaguars compiled an overall record of 4–5, with a conference record of 4–5, and finished and finished second in the SWAC West Division.

== Schedule ==
Date	Time	Opponent	Site	Result	Attendance	Source
September 3	7:00 p.m.	at McNeese State*	Cowboy Stadium; Lake Charles, LA	Canceled (Note: The game against McNeese State scheduled for September 3 was canceled due to the impacts of Hurricane Katrina in Greater New Orleans and throughout Louisiana.)		
September 10	5:00 p.m.	at Mississippi Valley State	Rice–Totten Stadium; Itta Bena, MS	L 28–31	8,473	
September 17	7:00 p.m.	Prairie View A&M	A. W. Mumford Stadium; Baton Rouge, LA	W 38–0	15,994	
September 24	7:00 p.m.	Albany State*	A. W. Mumford Stadium; Baton Rouge, LA	Canceled (Note: The game against Albany State scheduled for September 24 was canceled due to the impacts of Hurricane Rita.)		
October 1	5:00 p.m.	vs. Alabama State	Ladd–Peebles Stadium; Mobile, AL (Gulf Coast Classic)	L 35–45	24,811	
October 8	6:30 p.m.	Alabama A&M^{†}	A. W. Mumford Stadium; Baton Rouge, LA	L 7–20		
October 15	7:00 p.m.	at Jackson State	A. W. Mumford Stadium; Baton Rouge, LA (rivalry)	W 20–14	21,617	
October 22	3:00 p.m.	Alcorn State	A. W. Mumford Stadium; Baton Rouge, LA	L 16–38	17,341	
November 5		at Texas Southern	Robertson Stadium; Houston, TX	W 44–20		
November 12	4:00 p.m.	at Arkansas–Pine Bluff	Golden Lion Stadium; Pine Bluff, AR	W 27–21	6,450	
November 26	1:00 p.m.	vs. No. 11 Grambling State	Reliant Stadium; Houston, TX (Bayou Classic / College GameDay)	L 35–50	53,214	
*Non-conference game; ^{†}Homecoming; Rankings from The Sports Network Poll released prior to the game; All times are in Central time
