= Matt Viator =

American football coach (born 1963)

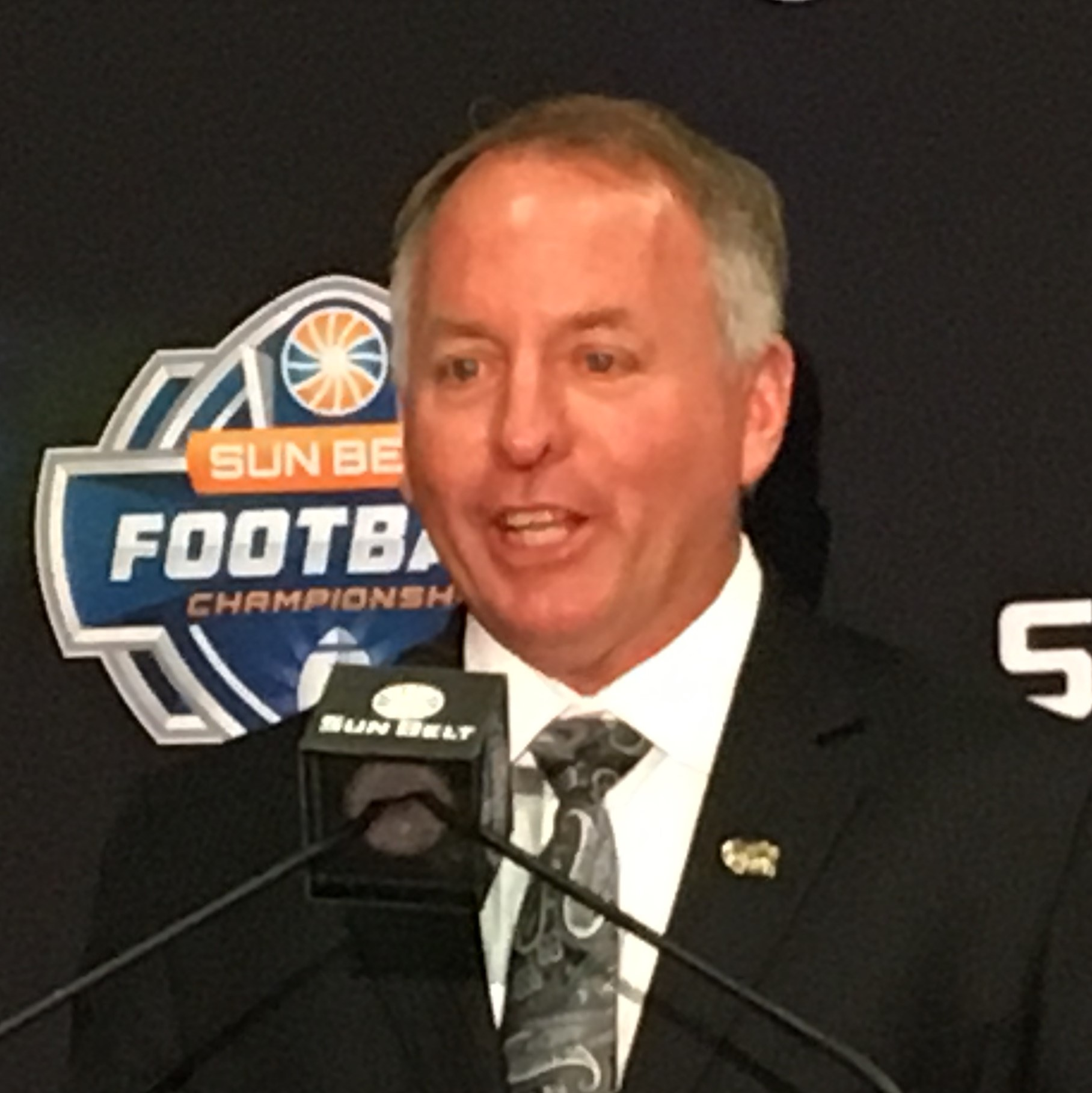
- Viator at 2018 Sun Belt Media Day

Current position
- Title: Head coach
- Team: McNeese
- Conference: Southland
- Record: 85–43

Biographical details
- Born: September 3, 1963 (age 63)
- Education: McNeese State University

Coaching career (HC unless noted)
- 1986–1988: Sam Houston HS (LA) (assistant)
- 1989–1990: Vinton HS (LA)
- 1991–1994: Jennings HS (LA)
- 1995–1998: Sulphur HS (LA)
- 1999: McNeese State (LB)
- 2000–2006: McNeese State (OC)
- 2006–2015: McNeese State
- 2016–2020: Louisiana–Monroe
- 2021–2024: Louisiana–Lafayette (QC)
- 2025–present: McNeese

Head coaching record
- Overall: 104–80 (college)
- Tournaments: 0–5 (NCAA D-I playoffs)

Accomplishments and honors

Championships
- 4 SLC (2006–2007, 2009, 2015)

Awards
- 3× Southland Coach of the Year (2006–2007, 2015)

Matt Viator (born September 3, 1963) is an American football coach. He is currently in his second stint as the head football coach at McNeese State University, having previously served there from 2006 to 2015 and then the University of Louisiana at Monroe from 2016 to 2020. Viator began his coaching career in 1986 as a high school assistant coach, before leading several high schools in southwestern Louisiana as a head coach. He moved to the college ranks at McNeese State in 1999 and was elevated to head coach four games into the 2006 season after the firing of Tommy Tate.

== Coaching career ==
=== High school ===
Viator led Jennings High School to a Louisiana Class 3A State Championship in 1992, the school's first, and only, state title since 1939.

== Head coaching record ==
=== College ===
| Year | Team | Overall | Conference | Standing | Bowl/playoffs |
|---|---|---|---|---|---|
McNeese State Cowboys (Southland Conference) (2006–2015)
| 2006 | McNeese State | 6–2 | 5–1 | 1st | L NCAA Division I First Round |
| 2007 | McNeese State | 11–1 | 7–0 | 1st | L NCAA Division I First Round |
| 2008 | McNeese State | 7–4 | 4–3 | T–3rd | |
| 2009 | McNeese State | 9–3 | 6–1 | T–1st | L NCAA Division I First Round |
| 2010 | McNeese State | 6–5 | 5–2 | 2nd | |
| 2011 | McNeese State | 6–5 | 4–3 | 4th | |
| 2012 | McNeese State | 7–4 | 4–3 | T–4th | |
| 2013 | McNeese State | 10–3 | 6–1 | 2nd | L NCAA Division I Second Round |
| 2014 | McNeese State | 6–5 | 4–4 | T–6th | |
| 2015 | McNeese State | 10–1 | 9–0 | 1st | L NCAA Division I Second Round |
Louisiana–Monroe Warhawks (Sun Belt Conference) (2016–2020)
| 2016 | Louisiana–Monroe | 4–8 | 3–5 | 7th | |
| 2017 | Louisiana–Monroe | 4–8 | 4–4 | T–5th | |
| 2018 | Louisiana–Monroe | 6–6 | 4–4 | 3rd (West) | |
| 2019 | Louisiana–Monroe | 5–7 | 4–4 | 3rd (West) | |
| 2020 | Louisiana–Monroe | 0–10 | 0–7 | 5th (West) | |
| Louisiana–Monroe: | | 19–39 | 15–24 | | |
McNeese Cowboys (Southland Conference) (2025–present)
| 2025 | McNeese | 5–7 | 4–4 | T–5th | |
| 2026 | McNeese | 2–3 | 1–2 | | |
| McNeese State: | | 85–43 | 59–24 | | |
| Total: | | 104–80 | | | |
National championship Conference title Conference division title or championship game berth
