= 2005 Towson Tigers football team =

American college football season

2005 Towson Tigers football
- Conference: Atlantic 10 Conference
- South Division
- Record: 6–5 (3–5 A-10)
- Head coach: Gordy Combs (14th season)
- Home stadium: Johnny Unitas Stadium

2005 Atlantic 10 Conference football standings
	Conf.			Overall
Team	W		L	W		L
North Division
No. 5 New Hampshire x+^	7	–	1	11	–	2
No. 19 UMass	6	–	2	7	–	4
Hofstra	5	–	3	8	–	4
Maine	3	–	5	5	–	6
Northeastern	2	–	6	3	–	9
Rhode Island	2	–	6	4	–	7
South Division
No. 8 Richmond x+^	7	–	1	9	–	4
No. 25 James Madison	5	–	3	7	–	4
Delaware	3	–	5	6	–	5
Towson	3	–	5	6	–	5
William & Mary	3	–	5	5	–	6
Villanova	2	–	6	4	–	7
+ – Conference co-champions; x – Division champion/co-champions; ^ – NCAA Division I-AA playoff participant; Rankings from The Sports Network poll

The 2005 Towson Tigers football team represented Towson University as a member of the Atlantic 10 Conference (A-10) during the 2005 NCAA Division I-AA football season. Led by 14th-year head coach Gordy Combs, the Tigers compiled an overall record of 6–4 with a mark of 3–5 in conference play, placing in a three-way tie for third in the A-10's South Division. The team played home games at Johnny Unitas Stadium in Towson, Maryland.

== Schedule ==
Date	Time	Opponent	Rank	Site	Result	Attendance	Source
September 1	7:00 p.m.	Morgan State*		Johnny Unitas Stadium; Towson, MD (The Battle for Greater Baltimore)	W 29–26	6,527	
September 10	6:00 p.m.	Lock Haven*		Johnny Unitas Stadium; Towson, MD	W 70–0	4,029	
September 17	3:00 p.m.	No. 3 New Hampshire		Johnny Unitas Stadium; Towson, MD	L 21–62	3,014	
September 24	12:30 p.m.	at Northeastern		Parsons Field; Brookline, MA	L 41–56	3,801	
October 1	6:00 p.m.	No. 5 Delaware^{†}		Johnny Unitas Stadium; Towson, MD	W 35–31	10,778	
October 8	12:00 p.m.	at Rhode Island		Meade Stadium; Kingston, RI	W 23–14	2,508	
October 15	7:00 p.m.	at Liberty*		Williams Stadium; Lynchburg, VA	W 38–17	3,033	
October 22	1:00 p.m.	at No. 12 William & Mary		Zable Stadium; Williamsburg, VA	L 13–44	8,922	
November 5	1:00 p.m.	Villanova		Johnny Unitas Stadium; Towson, MD	W 40–19	4,027	
November 12	12:00 p.m.	No. 18 Richmond		Johnny Unitas Stadium; Towson, MD	L 21–48	3,472	
November 19	1:30 p.m.	at James Madison		Bridgeforth Stadium; Harrisonburg, VA	L 14–55	11,635	
*Non-conference game; ^{†}Homecoming; Rankings from The Sports Network Poll released prior to the game; All times are in Eastern time
