= 2005 Colgate Raiders football team =

American college football season

2005 Colgate Raiders football

Patriot League co-champion
- Conference: Patriot League

Ranking
- Sports Network: No. 23
- Record: 8–4 (5–1 Patriot)
- Head coach: Dick Biddle (10th season)
- Captains: Jared Nepa; Mike Saraceno
- Home stadium: Andy Kerr Stadium

2005 Patriot League football standings
	Conf.			Overall
Team	W		L	W		L
No. 21 Lafayette +^	5	–	1	8	–	4
No. 23 Colgate +^	5	–	1	8	–	4
Lehigh	4	–	2	8	–	3
Holy Cross	3	–	3	6	–	5
Georgetown	2	–	4	4	–	7
Fordham	2	–	4	2	–	9
Bucknell	0	–	6	1	–	10
+ – Conference co-champions; ^ – NCAA Division I-AA playoff participant; Rankings from The Sports Network poll

The 2005 Colgate Raiders football team was an American football team that represented Colgate University during the 2005 NCAA Division I-AA football season. Colgate won the Patriot League co-championship but lost in the first round of the NCAA Division I-AA national playoffs.

In its 10th season under head coach Dick Biddle, the team compiled a 8–4 record (8–3 in the regular season). Jared Nepa and Mike Saraceno were the team captains.

The Raiders outscored opponents 283 to 245. Colgate's 5–1 conference record tied with Lafayette for first in the Patriot League standings. Colgate was awarded the Patriot League's automatic berth in the national playoffs, though co-champion Lafayette also participated, as an at-large selection. Both teams lost their first-round games.

Throughout the regular season, Colgate was unranked in the Division I-AA national top 25. Just before the start of the playoffs, the Raiders entered the poll at No. 24. In the year-end rankings, they rose to No. 23.

Colgate played its home games at Andy Kerr Stadium in Hamilton, New York.

== Schedule ==
Date	Opponent	Site	Result	Attendance	Source
September 3	Central Connecticut*	Andy Kerr Stadium; Hamilton, NY	L 22–24	4,629	
September 10	No. 15 UMass*	Andy Kerr Stadium; Hamilton, NY	W 17–14	3,417	
September 17	at Dartmouth*	Memorial Field; Hanover, NH	L 21–26	3,917	
October 1	Cornell*	Andy Kerr Stadium; Hamilton, NY (rivalry)	W 34–20	6,927	
October 8	at Princeton*	Princeton Stadium; Princeton, NJ	W 16–10	4,219	
October 15	Fordham	Andy Kerr Stadium; Hamilton, NY	W 23–0		
October 22	at Holy Cross	Fitton Field; Worcester, MA	W 24–17	11,236	
October 29	No. 16 Lehigh	Andy Kerr Stadium; Hamilton, NY	L 34–50		
November 5	at Lafayette	Fisher Field; Easton, PA	W 18–15		
November 12	Bucknell	Andy Kerr Stadium; Hamilton, NY	W 16–10		
November 19	at Georgetown	Multi-Sport Field; Washington, DC	W 34–7		
November 26	at No. 1 New Hampshire*	Cowell Stadium; Durham, NH (NCAA Division I-AA First Round)	L 21–55	7,806	
*Non-conference game; Rankings from The Sports Network Poll released prior to the game
