= 2005 Dartmouth Big Green football team =

American college football season

2005 Dartmouth Big Green football
- Conference: Ivy League
- Record: 2–8 (1–6 Ivy)
- Head coach: Buddy Teevens (6th season)
- Captains: Joshua Dooley; Anthony Gargiulo
- Home stadium: Memorial Field

2005 Ivy League football standings
	Conf.			Overall
Team	W		L	W		L
No. 15 Brown $	6	–	1	9	–	1
Princeton	5	–	2	7	–	3
Harvard	5	–	2	7	–	3
Yale	4	–	3	4	–	6
Cornell	4	–	3	6	–	4
Penn	3	–	4	5	–	5
Dartmouth	1	–	6	2	–	8
Columbia	0	–	7	2	–	8
$ – Conference champion; Rankings from The Sports Network poll

The 2005 Dartmouth Big Green football team was an American football team that represented Dartmouth College during the 2005 NCAA Division I-AA football season. Dartmouth finished second-to-last in the Ivy League.

The Big Green compiled a 2–8 record and were outscored 260 to 126. Joshua Dooley and Anthony Gargiulo were the team captains. Head coach Eugene "Buddy" Teevens returned to lead the Big Green for the 2005 season. He had previously been the head coach at Dartmouth from 1987 to 1991.

The Big Green's 1–6 conference record placed seventh in the Ivy League standings. Dartmouth was outscored 162 to 64 by Ivy opponents.

Dartmouth played its home games at Memorial Field on the college campus in Hanover, New Hampshire.

== Schedule ==
Date	Opponent	Site	Result	Attendance	Source
September 17	Colgate*	Memorial Field; Hanover, NH	W 26–21	3,917	
September 24	at No. 2 New Hampshire*	Cowell Stadium; Durham, NH (rivalry)	L 20–49	7,145	
October 1	Penn	Memorial Field; Hanover, NH	L 9–26	6,710	
October 8	at Yale	Yale Bowl; New Haven, CT	L 0–13	2,420	
October 15	at Holy Cross*	Fitton Field; Worcester, MA	L 16–28	3,011	
October 22	Columbia^{†}	Memorial Field; Hanover, NH	W 17–6	6,222	
October 29	at Harvard	Harvard Stadium; Boston, MA (rivalry)	L 14–42	12,661	
November 5	Cornell	Memorial Field; Hanover, NH (rivalry)	L 10–21	5,017	
November 12	at No. 20 Brown	Brown Stadium; Providence, RI	L 14–24	8,122	
November 19	Princeton	Memorial Field; Hanover, NH	L 0–30	4,720	
*Non-conference game; ^{†}Homecoming; Rankings from The Sports Network Poll released prior to the game
