= 2005 William & Mary Tribe football team =

American college football season

2005 William & Mary Tribe football
- Conference: Atlantic 10 Conference
- South Division
- Record: 5–6 (3–5 A-10)
- Head coach: Jimmye Laycock (26th season)
- Offensive coordinator: Zbig Kepa (13th season)
- Captains: Josh Lustig; Travis McLaurin; Pat Mulloy; Adam O'Connor
- Home stadium: Zable Stadium

2005 Atlantic 10 Conference football standings
	Conf.			Overall
Team	W		L	W		L
North Division
No. 5 New Hampshire x+^	7	–	1	11	–	2
No. 19 UMass	6	–	2	7	–	4
Hofstra	5	–	3	8	–	4
Maine	3	–	5	5	–	6
Northeastern	2	–	6	3	–	9
Rhode Island	2	–	6	4	–	7
South Division
No. 8 Richmond x+^	7	–	1	9	–	4
No. 25 James Madison	5	–	3	7	–	4
Delaware	3	–	5	6	–	5
Towson	3	–	5	6	–	5
William & Mary	3	–	5	5	–	6
Villanova	2	–	6	4	–	7
+ – Conference co-champions; x – Division champion/co-champions; ^ – NCAA Division I-AA playoff participant; Rankings from The Sports Network poll

The 2005 William & Mary Tribe football team represented the College of William & Mary as member of South Division of the Atlantic 10 Conference (A-10) during the 2005 NCAA Division I-AA football season. Led by Jimmye Laycock in his 26th year as head coach, William & Mary finished the season with an overall record of 5–6 and a mark of 3–5 in A-10 play, tying for third place in the South Division.

== Schedule ==
Date	Time	Opponent	Rank	Site	TV	Result	Attendance	Source
September 1	7:00 pm	at Marshall*	No. 9	Joan C. Edwards Stadium; Huntington, WV		L 24–36	25,102	
September 10	1:00 pm	at VMI*	No. 11	Alumni Memorial Field; Lexington, VA (rivalry)		W 41–7	7,140	
September 17	7:00 pm	at Rhode Island	No. 7	Meade Stadium; Kingston, RI	CSN	L 29–48	3,303	
September 24	1:00 pm	Liberty*	No. 16	Zable Stadium; Williamsburg, VA		W 56–0	11,741	
October 8	1:00 pm	No. 1 New Hampshire	No. 17	Zable Stadium; Williamsburg, VA		W 42–10	4,149	
October 15	2:00 pm	at Northeastern	No. 11	Parsons Field; Brookline, MA		W 44–41 ^{OT}	2,118	
October 22	1:00 pm	Towson^{†}	No. 12	Zable Stadium; Williamsburg, VA		W 44–13	8,922	
October 29	6:00 pm	at Villanova	No. 9	Villanova Stadium; Villanova, PA		L 21–35	6,207	
November 5	7:00 pm	James Madison	No. 16	Zable Stadium; Williamsburg, VA (rivalry)		L 29–30	12,287	
November 12	1:00 pm	Delaware	No. 24	Zable Stadium; Williamsburg, VA (rivalry)		L 21–22	8,709	
November 19	1:00 pm	at No. 17 Richmond		University of Richmond Stadium; Richmond, VA (I-64 Bowl)		L 7–41	8,960	
*Non-conference game; ^{†}Homecoming; Rankings from The Sports Network Poll released prior to the game; All times are in Eastern time
