= 2005 Albany Great Danes football team =

American college football season

2005 Albany Great Danes football
- Conference: Northeast Conference
- Record: 5–6 (4–3 NEC)
- Head coach: Bob Ford (36th season)
- Offensive coordinator: Peter Rossomando (1st season)
- Defensive coordinator: Mike Simpson (19th season)
- Home stadium: University Field

2005 Northeast Conference football standings
	Conf.			Overall
Team	W		L	W		L
Central Connecticut State +	5	–	2	7	–	4
Stony Brook +	5	–	2	6	–	5
Monmouth	4	–	3	6	–	4
Albany	4	–	3	5	–	6
Wagner	3	–	4	6	–	5
Sacred Heart	3	–	4	4	–	6
Saint Francis (PA)	3	–	4	3	–	8
Robert Morris	1	–	6	2	–	8
+ – Conference co-champions

The 2005 Albany Great Danes football team represented the University at Albany, SUNY as a member of the Northeast Conference (NEC) during the 2005 NCAA Division I-AA football season. Led by 36-year head coach Bob Ford, the Great Danes compiled an overall record of 5–6 with a mark of 4–3 in conference play, placing in a tie for third in the NEC. The team played home games at University Field in Albany New York.

== Schedule ==
Date	Time	Opponent	Site	Result	Attendance
September 10		No. 24 Hofstra*	University Field; Albany, NY	L 7–36	
September 17	6:00 pm	at No. 25 UMass*	McGuirk Stadium; Hadley, MA	L 0–40	10,177
September 24		at Central Connecticut State	Arute Field; New Britain, CT	L 13–14	
October 1		at Maine*	Alfond Stadium; Orono, ME	L 7–31	5,745
October 8	4:00 pm	Stony Brook^{†}	University Field; Albany, NY (rivalry)	L 3–7	1,121
October 15	4:00 pm	Sacred Heart	University Field; Albany, NY	W 21–7	
October 22	1:00 pm	at Saint Francis (PA)	Pine Bowl; Loretto, PA	W 25–16	1,181
October 29	1:00 pm	at Wagner	Wagner College Stadium; Staten Island, NY	W 38–10	2,212
November 5		Robert Morris	University Field; Albany, NY	W 20–17	1,875
November 12	1:00 pm	at Monmouth	Kessler Field; West Long Branch, NJ	L 13–16	1,842
November 19	1:00 pm	at Fordham*	Coffey Field; Bronx, NY	W 41–0	2,367
*Non-conference game; ^{†}Homecoming; Rankings from The Sports Network Poll released prior to the game; All times are in Eastern time
