= 2005 Princeton Tigers football team =

American college football season

2005 Princeton Tigers football
- Conference: Ivy League
- Record: 7–3 (5–2 Ivy)
- Head coach: Roger Hughes (6th season)
- Captains: Ben Brielmaier; Justin Stull
- Home stadium: Princeton Stadium

2005 Ivy League football standings
	Conf.			Overall
Team	W		L	W		L
No. 15 Brown $	6	–	1	9	–	1
Princeton	5	–	2	7	–	3
Harvard	5	–	2	7	–	3
Yale	4	–	3	4	–	6
Cornell	4	–	3	6	–	4
Penn	3	–	4	5	–	5
Dartmouth	1	–	6	2	–	8
Columbia	0	–	7	2	–	8
$ – Conference champion; Rankings from The Sports Network poll

The 2005 Princeton Tigers football team was an American football team that represented Princeton University during the 2005 NCAA Division I-AA football season. Princeton tied for second in the Ivy League.

In their sixth year under head coach Roger Hughes, the Tigers compiled a 7–3 record and outscored opponents 245 to 163. Ben Brielmaier and Justin Stull were the team captains.

Princeton's 5–2 conference tied with Harvard for second in the Ivy League standings. The Tigers outscored Ivy opponents 192 to 109.

The Tigers played their home games at Princeton Stadium, on the university campus in Princeton, New Jersey.

== Schedule ==
Date	Opponent	Site	Result	Attendance	Source
September 17	at Lafayette*	Fisher Field; Easton, PA	W 23–21	4,915	
September 24	San Diego*	Princeton Stadium; Princeton, NJ	W 20–17	6,216	
October 1	Columbia	Princeton Stadium; Princeton, NJ	W 43–3	8,835	
October 8	Colgate*	Princeton Stadium; Princeton, NJ	L 10–16	4,219	
October 15	at Brown	Brown Stadium; Providence, RI	L 28–31	5,031	
October 22	at Harvard	Harvard Stadium; Boston, MA (rivalry)	W 27–24	12,023	
October 29	Cornell	Princeton Stadium; Princeton, NJ	W 20–17 ^{OT}	9,315	
November 5	at Penn	Franklin Field; Philadelphia, PA (rivalry)	W 30–13	20,036	
November 12	Yale	Princeton Stadium; Princeton, NJ (rivalry)	L 14–21	18,265	
November 19	at Dartmouth	Memorial Field; Hanover, NH	W 30–0	4,720	
*Non-conference game

== Roster ==
2005 Princeton Tigers football team roster
Players
Coaches
Offense

Pos.	#	Name	Class
QB	14	Chris Lee	Jr
QB	4	Jeff Terrell	Jr
RB	27	Greg Fields	Sr
RB	35	Cleo Kirkland	Jr
RB	23	Derek Brooks	So
FB	44	Brock Bell	Sr
FB	30	Evan O'Reilly	So
TE	82	John Dekker	Sr

Defense

Pos.	#	Name	Class

Special teams

Pos.	#	Name	Class

Head coach

- Roger Hughes

Coordinators/assistant coaches

- Stan Clayton (offensive line)

Legend

- (C) Team captain
- (S) Suspended
- (I) Ineligible
- Injured
- Redshirt

Roster
