= 2005 Saint Francis Red Flash football team =

American college football season

2005 Saint Francis Red Flash football
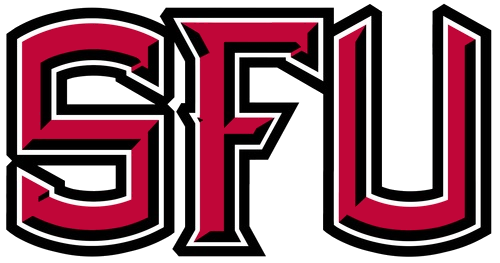
- Conference: Northeast Conference
- Record: 3–8 (3–5 NEC)
- Head coach: Dave Opfar (4th season)
- Home stadium: Pine Bowl

2005 Northeast Conference football standings
	Conf.			Overall
Team	W		L	W		L
Central Connecticut State +	5	–	2	7	–	4
Stony Brook +	5	–	2	6	–	5
Monmouth	4	–	3	6	–	4
Albany	4	–	3	5	–	6
Wagner	3	–	4	6	–	5
Sacred Heart	3	–	4	4	–	6
Saint Francis (PA)	3	–	4	3	–	8
Robert Morris	1	–	6	2	–	8
+ – Conference co-champions

The 2005 Saint Francis Red Flash football team represented Saint Francis University as a member of the Northeast Conference (NEC) during the 2005 NCAA Division I FCS football season. The Red Flash were led by fourth-year head coach Dave Opfar. It was the final season in which the team played their home games at the Pine Bowl. They finished the season 3–8 overall and 3–5 in NEC play to place in a three-way tie for third place.

== Schedule ==
Date	Time	Opponent	Site	Result	Attendance
September 3	1:00 p.m.	Morehead State*	Pine Bowl; Loretto, PA	L 25–26	1,152
September 10	11:00 a.m.	at Saint Peter's*	Cochrane Stadium; Jersey City, NJ	L 22–25	1,147
September 24	1:00 p.m.	at La Salle*	McCarthy Stadium; Philadelphia, PA	L 27–29	1,361
October 1	1:00 p.m.	at Robert Morris	Joe Walton Stadium; Moon Township, PA	W 35–28	3,784
October 8	1:00 p.m.	Central Connecticut State	Pine Bowl; Loretto, PA	W 31–28	1,078
October 15	1:00 p.m.	at Stony Brook	Kenneth P. LaValle Stadium; Stony Brook, NY	L 29–47	2,631
October 22	1:00 p.m.	Albany	Pine Bowl; Loretto, PA	L 16–25	1,181
October 29	12:30 p.m.	at Sacred Heart	Campus Field; Fairfield, CT	L 45–53	2,007
November 5	1:00 p.m.	Monmouth	Pine Bowl; Loretto, PA	W 19–15	1,273
November 12	1:00 p.m.	at Wagner	Wagner College Stadium; Staten Island, NY	L 21–23	1,777
November 19	1:00 p.m.	Duquesne*	Pine Bowl; Loretto, PA	L 17–44	
*Non-conference game; All times are in Eastern time
