= 2005 Robert Morris Colonials football team =

American college football season

2005 Robert Morris Colonials football
- Conference: Northeast Conference
- Record: 2–8 (1–6 NEC)
- Head coach: Joe Walton (12th season)
- Defensive coordinator: Dan Radakovich (11th season)
- Home stadium: Joe Walton Stadium

2005 Northeast Conference football standings
	Conf.			Overall
Team	W		L	W		L
Central Connecticut State +	5	–	2	7	–	4
Stony Brook +	5	–	2	6	–	5
Monmouth	4	–	3	6	–	4
Albany	4	–	3	5	–	6
Wagner	3	–	4	6	–	5
Sacred Heart	3	–	4	4	–	6
Saint Francis (PA)	3	–	4	3	–	8
Robert Morris	1	–	6	2	–	8
+ – Conference co-champions

The 2005 Robert Morris Colonials football team represented Robert Morris University in the 2005 NCAA Division I-AA football season. The Colonials were led by 12th-year head coach Joe Walton and played their home games at Joe Walton Stadium. They were a member of the Northeast Conference.

== Schedule ==
Date	Opponent	Site	Result	Attendance
September 3	at Duquesne*	Rooney Field; Pittsburgh, PA	L 12–23	4,861
September 17	Butler*	Joe Walton Stadium; Moon Township, PA	W 49–13	3,516
September 24	at Rowan*	John Page Field; Glassboro, NJ	L 28–35 ^{OT}	2,713
October 1	Saint Francis	Joe Walton Stadium; Moon Township, PA	L 28–35	3,784
October 8	Wagner	Joe Walton Stadium; Moon Township, PA	W 38–30	1,604
October 15	at Central Connecticut State	Arute Field; New Britain, CT	L 14–21	1,268
October 22	at Monmouth	Kessler Field; West Long Branch, NJ	L 0–14	1,882
October 29	Stony Brook	Joe Walton Stadium; Moon Township, PA	L 37–38	1,439
November 5	at Albany	University Field; Albany, NY	L 17–20	1,875
November 12	Sacred Heart	Joe Walton Stadium; Moon Township, PA	L 20–27	1,231
*Non-conference game
