= 2005 Maine Black Bears football team =

American college football season

2005 Maine Black Bears football
- Conference: Atlantic 10 Conference
- North Division
- Record: 5–6 (3–5 A-10)
- Head coach: Jack Cosgrove (13th season)
- Offensive coordinator: Bobby Wilder (6th season)
- Defensive coordinator: Rich Nagy (5th season)
- Captains: Jermaine Walker; Ben Lazarski
- Home stadium: Alfond Stadium

2005 Atlantic 10 Conference football standings
| | Conf. | | | Overall |
| Team | W | | L | W | | L |
|---|---|---|---|---|---|---|
North Division
| No. 5 New Hampshire x+^ | 7 | – | 1 | 11 | – | 2 |
| No. 19 UMass | 6 | – | 2 | 7 | – | 4 |
| Hofstra | 5 | – | 3 | 8 | – | 4 |
| Maine | 3 | – | 5 | 5 | – | 6 |
| Northeastern | 2 | – | 6 | 3 | – | 9 |
| Rhode Island | 2 | – | 6 | 4 | – | 7 |
South Division
| No. 8 Richmond x+^ | 7 | – | 1 | 9 | – | 4 |
| No. 25 James Madison | 5 | – | 3 | 7 | – | 4 |
| Delaware | 3 | – | 5 | 6 | – | 5 |
| Towson | 3 | – | 5 | 6 | – | 5 |
| William & Mary | 3 | – | 5 | 5 | – | 6 |
| Villanova | 2 | – | 6 | 4 | – | 7 |
+ – Conference co-champions; x – Division champion/co-champions; ^ – NCAA Division I-AA playoff participant; Rankings from The Sports Network poll

The 2005 Maine Black Bears football team was an American football team that represented the University of Maine as a member of the Atlantic 10 Conference during the 2005 NCAA Division I FCS football season. In their 13th season under head coach Jack Cosgrove, the Black Bears compiled a 5–6 record (3–5 against conference opponents) and finished fourth in the Atlantic 10's North Division. Jermaine Walker and Ben Lazarski were the team captains.

== Schedule ==
| Date | Opponent | Site | Result | Attendance | Source |
|---|---|---|---|---|---|
| September 3 | at Nebraska* | Memorial Stadium; Lincoln, NE | L 7–25 | 77,469 | |
| September 10 | William Penn* | Alfond Stadium; Orono, ME | W 28–0 | 6,642 | |
| September 17 | Richmond | Alfond Stadium; Orono, ME | L 21–26 | 4,762 | |
| October 1 | Albany* | Alfond Stadium; Orono, ME | W 31–7 | 5,734 | |
| October 8 | at No. 5 James Madison | Bridgeforth Stadium; Harrisonburg, VA | L 2–38 | 15,087 | |
| October 15 | at Hofstra | James M. Shuart Stadium; Hempstead, NY | L 0–44 | 7,188 | |
| October 22 | No. 8 UMass | Alfond Stadium; Orono, ME | L 14–35 | 6,560 | |
| October 29 | Delaware | Alfond Stadium; Orono, ME | W 25–15 | 4,060 | |
| November 5 | at Northeastern | Parsons Field; Brookline, MA | W 14–10 | 3,152 | |
| November 12 | Rhode Island | Alfond Stadium; Orono, ME | W 27–24 ^{OT} | 5,050 | |
| November 19 | at No. 1 New Hampshire | Cowell Stadium; Durham, NH (Battle for the Brice–Cowell Musket) | L 47–59 | 8,606 | |
*Non-conference game; Rankings from The Sports Network Poll released prior to the game

== After the season ==
The following Black Bear was selected in the 2006 NFL draft after the season.

| Round | Pick | Player | Position | NFL club |
|---|---|---|---|---|
| 7 | 255 | Kevin McMahan | Wide receiver | Oakland Raiders |
