= 2005 Bucknell Bison football team =

American college football season

2005 Bucknell Bison football
- Conference: Patriot League
- Record: 1–10 (0–6 Patriot)
- Head coach: Tim Landis (3rd season)
- Offensive coordinator: Tim Camp (2nd season)
- Captains: Sean Conover; Stephen Watts
- Home stadium: Christy Mathewson–Memorial Stadium

2005 Patriot League football standings
	Conf.			Overall
Team	W		L	W		L
No. 21 Lafayette +^	5	–	1	8	–	4
No. 23 Colgate +^	5	–	1	8	–	4
Lehigh	4	–	2	8	–	3
Holy Cross	3	–	3	6	–	5
Georgetown	2	–	4	4	–	7
Fordham	2	–	4	2	–	9
Bucknell	0	–	6	1	–	10
+ – Conference co-champions; ^ – NCAA Division I-AA playoff participant; Rankings from The Sports Network poll

The 2005 Bucknell Bison football team was an American football team that represented Bucknell University during the 2005 NCAA Division I-AA football season. It finished last in the Patriot League.

Bucknell played its home games at Christy Mathewson–Memorial Stadium on the university campus in Lewisburg, Pennsylvania.

In its third year under head coach Tim Landis, the Bison compiled a 1–10 record. Sean Conover and Stephen Watts were the team captains.

The Bison were outscored 332 to 179. Bucknell's winless (0–6) conference record finished seventh in the Patriot League standings.

== Schedule ==
Date	Opponent	Site	Result	Attendance	Source
September 3	Georgetown	Christy Mathewson–Memorial Stadium; Lewisburg, PA	L 16–19 ^{OT}	6,802	
September 10	at Stony Brook*	Kenneth P. LaValle Stadium; Stony Brook, NY	L 18–21	4,101	
September 17	at Cornell*	Schoellkopf Field; Ithaca, NY	L 7–24	12,723	
October 1	Marist^{†}*	Christy Mathewson–Memorial Stadium; Lewisburg, PA	W 27–7	6,250	
October 8	at Penn*	Franklin Field; Philadelphia, PA	L 7–53	5,245	
October 15	Villanova*	Christy Mathewson–Memorial Stadium; Lewisburg, PA	L 10–38	3,259	
October 22	No. 21 Lehigh^	Christy Mathewson–Memorial Stadium; Lewisburg, PA	L 10–42	2,695	
October 29	at Lafayette	Fisher Field; Easton, PA	L 20–33		
November 5	at Fordham	Coffey Field; Bronx, NY	L 21–28	3,766	
November 12	at Colgate	Andy Kerr Stadium; Hamilton, NY	L 10–16		
November 19	Holy Cross	Christy Mathewson–Memorial Stadium; Lewisburg, PA	L 33–51	3,120	
*Non-conference game; ^{†}Homecoming; ^ Parents Weekend; Rankings from The Sports Network Poll released prior to the game
