= 2005 Monmouth Hawks football team =

American college football season

2005 Monmouth Hawks football
- Conference: Northeast Conference
- Record: 6–4 (4–3 NEC)
- Head coach: Kevin Callahan (13th season)
- Offensive coordinator: Mark Fabish (4th season)
- Offensive scheme: Pro-style
- Defensive coordinator: Andy Bobik (12th season)
- Base defense: 4–3
- Home stadium: Kessler Field

2005 Northeast Conference football standings
	Conf.			Overall
Team	W		L	W		L
Central Connecticut State +	5	–	2	7	–	4
Stony Brook +	5	–	2	6	–	5
Monmouth	4	–	3	6	–	4
Albany	4	–	3	5	–	6
Wagner	3	–	4	6	–	5
Sacred Heart	3	–	4	4	–	6
Saint Francis (PA)	3	–	4	3	–	8
Robert Morris	1	–	6	2	–	8
+ – Conference co-champions

The 2005 Monmouth Hawks football team represented Monmouth University in the 2005 NCAA Division I FCS football season as a member of the Northeast Conference (NEC). The Hawks were led by 13th-year head coach Kevin Callahan and played their home games at Kessler Field. They finished the season 6–4 overall and 4–3 in NEC play to tie for second place.

== Schedule ==
Date	Time	Opponent	Site	Result	Attendance
September 3	1:00 p.m.	at Lehigh*	Goodman Stadium; Bethlehem, PA	L 26–54	8,063
September 10	1:00 p.m.	at La Salle*	McCarthy Stadium; Philadelphia, PA	W 65–27	1,705
September 17	1:00 p.m.	California (PA)*	Kessler Field; West Long Branch, NJ	W 16–15	2,650
October 1	1:00 p.m.	at Stony Brook	Kenneth P. LaValle Stadium; Stony Brook, NY	W 36–7	2,534
October 8	1:00 p.m.	at Sacred Heart	Campus Field; Fairfield, CT	W 45–14	1,132
October 15	1:00 p.m.	Wagner	Kessler Field; West Long Branch, NJ	L 20–26	3,156
October 22	1:00 p.m.	Robert Morris	Kessler Field; West Long Branch, NJ	W 14–0	1,882
October 29	1:00 p.m.	at Central Connecticut State	Arute Field; New Britain, CT	L 13–15	2,670
November 5	1:00 p.m.	at Saint Francis (PA)	Pine Bowl; Loretto, PA	L 15–19	1,273
November 12	1:00 p.m.	Albany	Kessler Field; West Long Branch, NJ	W 16–13	1,842
*Non-conference game; All times are in Eastern time
