= 2005 Delaware Fightin' Blue Hens football team =

American college football season

2005 Delaware Fightin' Blue Hens football
- Conference: Atlantic 10 Conference
- South Division
- Record: 6–5 (3–5 A-10)
- Head coach: K. C. Keeler (4th season)
- Offensive coordinator: Kirk Ciarrocca (4th season)
- Offensive scheme: Spread
- Defensive coordinator: Dave Cohen (4th season)
- Base defense: 4–3
- Home stadium: Delaware Stadium

2005 Atlantic 10 Conference football standings
	Conf.			Overall
Team	W		L	W		L
North Division
No. 5 New Hampshire x+^	7	–	1	11	–	2
No. 19 UMass	6	–	2	7	–	4
Hofstra	5	–	3	8	–	4
Maine	3	–	5	5	–	6
Northeastern	2	–	6	3	–	9
Rhode Island	2	–	6	4	–	7
South Division
No. 8 Richmond x+^	7	–	1	9	–	4
No. 25 James Madison	5	–	3	7	–	4
Delaware	3	–	5	6	–	5
Towson	3	–	5	6	–	5
William & Mary	3	–	5	5	–	6
Villanova	2	–	6	4	–	7
+ – Conference co-champions; x – Division champion/co-champions; ^ – NCAA Division I-AA playoff participant; Rankings from The Sports Network poll

The 2005 Delaware Fightin' Blue Hens football team represented the University of Delaware as a member of the South Division of the Atlantic 10 Conference (A-10) during the 2005 NCAA Division I-AA football season. Led by fourth-year head coach K. C. Keeler, the Fightin' Blue Hens compiled an overall record of 6–5 with a mark of 3–5 in conference play, placing in a three-way tie for third in the A-10's South Division. The team played home games at Delaware Stadium in Newark, Delaware.

== Schedule ==
Date	Time	Opponent	Rank	Site	TV	Result	Attendance	Source
September 10	7:00 pm	No. 14 Lehigh*	No. 10	Delaware Stadium; Newark, DE (rivalry)	CN8	W 34–33 ^{OT}	22,537	
September 17	7:00 pm	No. 23 D-II) West Chester*	No. 6	Delaware Stadium; Newark, DE (rivalry)	STN	W 42–21	22,331	
September 24	7:00 pm	Holy Cross*	No. 6	Delaware Stadium; Newark, DE	STN	W 35–23	22,025	
October 1	6:00 pm	at Towson	No. 5	Johnny Unitas Stadium; Towson, MD	STN	L 31–35	10,778	
October 8	12:00 pm	Hofstra^{†}	No. 13	Delaware Stadium; Newark, DE	CSN	L 6–10	22,030	
October 15	12:00 pm	at Richmond	No. 22	University of Richmond Stadium; Richmond, VA	STN	L 10–20	3,115	
October 22	12:00 pm	No. 11 James Madison		Delaware Stadium; Newark, DE (rivalry)	CSTV	W 34–28	22,059	
October 29	12:00 pm	at Maine		Alfond Stadium; Orono, ME	CN8	L 15–25	4,060	
November 5	1:00 pm	No. 8 UMass		Delaware Stadium; Newark, DE	CN8	L 8–35	22,078	
November 12	1:00 pm	at No. 24 William & Mary		Zable Stadium; Williamsburg, VA (rivalry)	STN	W 22–21	8,709	
November 19	1:00 pm	at Villanova		Villanova Stadium; Villanova, PA (Battle of the Blue)	CN8	W 38–13	9,611	
*Non-conference game; ^{†}Homecoming; Rankings from The Sports Network Poll released prior to the game; All times are in Eastern time
