= 2005 UMass Minutemen football team =

American college football season

2005 UMass Minutemen football
- Conference: Atlantic 10 Conference
- North Division
- Record: 7–4 (6–2 A-10)
- Head coach: Don Brown (2nd season)
- Offensive coordinator: Kevin Morris (2nd season)
- Offensive scheme: Pro-style
- Defensive coordinator: Keith Dudzinski (2nd season)
- Base defense: 4–3
- Home stadium: Warren McGuirk Alumni Stadium

2005 Atlantic 10 Conference football standings
	Conf.			Overall
Team	W		L	W		L
North Division
No. 5 New Hampshire x+^	7	–	1	11	–	2
No. 19 UMass	6	–	2	7	–	4
Hofstra	5	–	3	8	–	4
Maine	3	–	5	5	–	6
Northeastern	2	–	6	3	–	9
Rhode Island	2	–	6	4	–	7
South Division
No. 8 Richmond x+^	7	–	1	9	–	4
No. 25 James Madison	5	–	3	7	–	4
Delaware	3	–	5	6	–	5
Towson	3	–	5	6	–	5
William & Mary	3	–	5	5	–	6
Villanova	2	–	6	4	–	7
+ – Conference co-champions; x – Division champion/co-champions; ^ – NCAA Division I-AA playoff participant; Rankings from The Sports Network poll

The 2005 UMass Minutemen football team represented the University of Massachusetts Amherst in the 2005 NCAA Division I FCS football season as a member of the Atlantic 10 Conference. The team was coached by Don Brown and played its home games at Warren McGuirk Alumni Stadium in Hadley, Massachusetts. The Minutemen finished second in the North division of the A-10 with a record of 7–4 (6–2 A-10).

== Schedule ==
Date	Time	Opponent	Rank	Site	TV	Result	Attendance
September 1	7:00 p.m.	at Richmond	No. 15	UR Stadium; Richmond, VA		W 19–6	6,040
September 10	12:00 p.m.	at Colgate*	No. 15	Andy Kerr Stadium; Hamilton, NY	CN8, TWCS	L 14–17	3,417
September 17	6:00 p.m.	Albany*	No. 25	McGuirk Stadium; Hadley, MA		W 40–0	10,177
September 24	6:00 p.m.	No. 25 Rhode Island	No. 24	McGuirk Stadium; Hadley, MA		W 14–6	15,314
October 8	1:00 p.m.	Northeastern	No. 18	McGuirk Stadium; Hadley, MA		W 27–0	4,257
October 15	12:00 p.m.	No. 4 James Madison^{†}	No. 13	McGuirk Stadium; Hadley, MA	CN8	W 10–7	4,476
October 22	2:00 p.m.	at Maine	No. 8	Alfond Stadium; Orono, ME		W 35–14	6,560
October 29	12:00 p.m.	No. 4 New Hampshire	No. 7	McGuirk Stadium; Hadley, MA (rivalry)	CN8	L 28–34	12,359
November 5	1:00 p.m.	at Delaware	No. 8	Delaware Stadium; Newark, DE	CN8	W 35–7	22,078
November 12	1:00 p.m.	at Army*	No. 5	Michie Stadium; West Point, NY	ESPNU	L 27–34	34,055
November 19	1:00 p.m.	at Hofstra	No. 7	Shuart Stadium; Hempstead, NY	RNN	L 10–21	3,502
*Non-conference game; ^{†}Homecoming; Rankings from The Sports Network Poll released prior to the game; All times are in Eastern time
