= 2005 Wagner Seahawks football team =

American college football season

2005 Wagner Seahawks football
- Conference: Northeast Conference
- Record: 6–5 (3–4 NEC)
- Head coach: Walt Hameline (25th season)
- Home stadium: Wagner College Stadium

2005 Northeast Conference football standings
	Conf.			Overall
Team	W		L	W		L
Central Connecticut State +	5	–	2	7	–	4
Stony Brook +	5	–	2	6	–	5
Monmouth	4	–	3	6	–	4
Albany	4	–	3	5	–	6
Wagner	3	–	4	6	–	5
Sacred Heart	3	–	4	4	–	6
Saint Francis (PA)	3	–	4	3	–	8
Robert Morris	1	–	6	2	–	8
+ – Conference co-champions

The 2005 Wagner Seahawks football team represented Wagner College in the 2005 NCAA Division I-AA football season as a member of the Northeast Conference (NEC). The Seahawks were led by 25th-year head coach Walt Hameline and played their home games at Wagner College Stadium. Wagner finished the season 6–5 overall and 3–4 in NEC play to place in a three-way tie for third.

== Schedule ==
Date	Time	Opponent	Site	Result	Attendance
September 3	1:00 p.m.	La Salle*	Wagner College Stadium; Staten Island, NY	W 41–27	2,640
September 10	1:00 p.m.	at Iona*	Mazzella Field; New Rochelle, NY	W 14–0	1,126
September 15	7:00 p.m.	at Saint Peter's*	Cochrane Stadium; Jersey City, NJ	W 52–25	1,635
September 24	1:00 p.m.	Marist*	Wagner College Stadium; Staten Island, NY	L 21–38	2,445
October 1	1:00 p.m.	Sacred Heart	Wagner College Stadium; Staten Island, NY	W 26–21	2,342
October 8	1:00 p.m.	at Robert Morris	Joe Walton Stadium; Moon Township, PA	L 30–38	603
October 15	1:00 p.m.	at Monmouth	Kessler Field; West Long Branch, NJ	W 26–20	3,156
October 22	1:00 p.m.	Central Connecticut	Wagner College Stadium; Staten Island, NY	L 34–38	3,143
October 29	1:00 p.m.	Albany	Wagner College Stadium; Staten Island, NY	L 10–38	2,212
November 5	1:00 p.m.	at Stony Brook	Kenneth P. LaValle Stadium; Stony Brook, NY	L 10–28	2,760
November 12	1:00 p.m.	Saint Francis (PA)	Wagner College Stadium; Staten Island, NY	W 23–21	1,777
*Non-conference game; All times are in Eastern time
