= 2005 Columbia Lions football team =

American college football season

2005 Columbia Lions football
- Conference: Ivy League
- Record: 2–8 (0–7 Ivy)
- Head coach: Bob Shoop (3rd season)
- Captains: Bill Beechum; Prosper Nwokocha; Joe Winters
- Home stadium: Wien Stadium

2005 Ivy League football standings
	Conf.			Overall
Team	W		L	W		L
No. 15 Brown $	6	–	1	9	–	1
Princeton	5	–	2	7	–	3
Harvard	5	–	2	7	–	3
Yale	4	–	3	4	–	6
Cornell	4	–	3	6	–	4
Penn	3	–	4	5	–	5
Dartmouth	1	–	6	2	–	8
Columbia	0	–	7	2	–	8
$ – Conference champion; Rankings from The Sports Network poll

The 2005 Columbia Lions football team was an American football team that represented Columbia University during the 2005 NCAA Division I-AA football season. Columbia finished last in the Ivy League.

In their third and final season under head coach Bob Shoop, the Lions compiled a 2–8 record and were outscored 337 to 116. Bill Beechum, Prosper Nwokocha and Joe Winters were the team captains.

The Lions' winless (0–7) conference record placed eighth in the Ivy League standings. Columbia was outscored 293 to 63 by Ivy opponents.

Columbia played its homes games at Lawrence A. Wien Stadium in Upper Manhattan, in New York City.

== Schedule ==
Date	Opponent	Site	Result	Attendance	Source
September 17	at Fordham*	Coffey Field; Bronx, NY (Liberty Cup)	W 23–17	6,912	
September 24	Duquesne*	Wien Stadium; New York, NY	W 23–13	3,511	
October 1	at Princeton	Princeton Stadium; Princeton, NJ	L 3–43	8,835	
October 8	at Lafayette*	Fisher Field; Easton, PA	L 7–14	1,500	
October 15	Penn^{†}	Wien Stadium; New York, NY	L 16–44	10,131	
October 22	at Dartmouth	Memorial Field; Hanover, NH	L 6–17	6,222	
October 29	Yale	Wien Stadium; New York, NY	L 3–37	2,025	
November 5	Harvard	Wien Stadium; New York, NY	L 7–55	2,354	
November 12	at Cornell	Schoellkopf Field; Ithaca, NY (rivalry)	L 7–45	4,727	
November 19	No. 18 Brown	Wien Stadium; New York, NY	L 21–52	6,705	
*Non-conference game; ^{†}Homecoming; Rankings from The Sports Network Poll released prior to the game
