= 2005 Holy Cross Crusaders football team =

American college football season

2005 Holy Cross Crusaders football
- Conference: Patriot League
- Record: 6–5 (3–3 Patriot)
- Head coach: Tom Gilmore (2nd season)
- Offensive coordinator: Chris Pincince (2nd season)
- Captains: Gideon Akande; John O'Neil; Steve Silva
- Home stadium: Fitton Field

2005 Patriot League football standings
	Conf.			Overall
Team	W		L	W		L
No. 21 Lafayette +^	5	–	1	8	–	4
No. 23 Colgate +^	5	–	1	8	–	4
Lehigh	4	–	2	8	–	3
Holy Cross	3	–	3	6	–	5
Georgetown	2	–	4	4	–	7
Fordham	2	–	4	2	–	9
Bucknell	0	–	6	1	–	10
+ – Conference co-champions; ^ – NCAA Division I-AA playoff participant; Rankings from The Sports Network poll

The 2005 Holy Cross Crusaders football team was an American football team that represented the College of the Holy Cross during the 2005 NCAA Division I-AA football season. Holy Cross finished fourth in the Patriot League.

In their second year under head coach Tom Gilmore, the Crusaders compiled a 6–5 record. Gideon Akande, John O'Neil and Steve Silva were the team captains.

The Crusaders outscored opponents 317 to 263. Holy Cross' 3–3 conference placed fourth out of seven in the Patriot League standings.

Holy Cross played its home games at Fitton Field on the college campus in Worcester, Massachusetts.

== Schedule ==
Date	Opponent	Site	Result	Attendance	Source
September 3	Sacred Heart*	Fitton Field; Worcester, MA	W 56–21	4,731	
September 10	Georgetown^{†}	Fitton Field; Worcester, MA	W 48–6	8,912	
September 17	No. 19 Harvard^{†}*	Fitton Field; Worcester, MA	L 21–31	8,238	
September 24	at No. 6 Delaware*	Delaware Stadium; Newark, DE	L 23–35	22,025	
October 1	at Yale*	Yale Bowl; New Haven, CT	W 22–19	12,793	
October 8	at No. 10 Lehigh	Goodman Stadium; Bethlehem, PA	W 13–10	5,713	
October 15	Dartmouth*	Fitton Field; Worcester, MA	W 28–16	3,011	
October 22	Colgate^	Fitton Field; Worcester, MA	L 14–27	11,236	
October 29	at Fordham	Coffey Field; Bronx, NY (rivalry)	L 20–24	5,771	
November 12	Lafayette	Fitton Field; Worcester, MA	L 21–41	6,179	
November 19	at Bucknell	Christy Mathewson–Memorial Stadium; Lewisburg, PA	W 51–33	3,120	
*Non-conference game; ^{†}Homecoming; ^ Family Weekend; Rankings from The Sports Network Poll released prior to the game
