= 2005 Brown Bears football team =

American college football season

2005 Brown Bears football

Ivy League champion
- Conference: Ivy League

Ranking
- Sports Network: No. 15
- Record: 9–1 (6–1 Ivy)
- Head coach: Phil Estes (8th season)
- Offensive scheme: Pro-style
- Defensive coordinator: Michael Kelleher (5th season)
- Base defense: 4–3
- Captains: James Frazier; Jamie Gasparella; Nick Hartigan
- Home stadium: Brown Stadium

2005 Ivy League football standings
	Conf.			Overall
Team	W		L	W		L
No. 15 Brown $	6	–	1	9	–	1
Princeton	5	–	2	7	–	3
Harvard	5	–	2	7	–	3
Yale	4	–	3	4	–	6
Cornell	4	–	3	6	–	4
Penn	3	–	4	5	–	5
Dartmouth	1	–	6	2	–	8
Columbia	0	–	7	2	–	8
$ – Conference champion; Rankings from The Sports Network poll

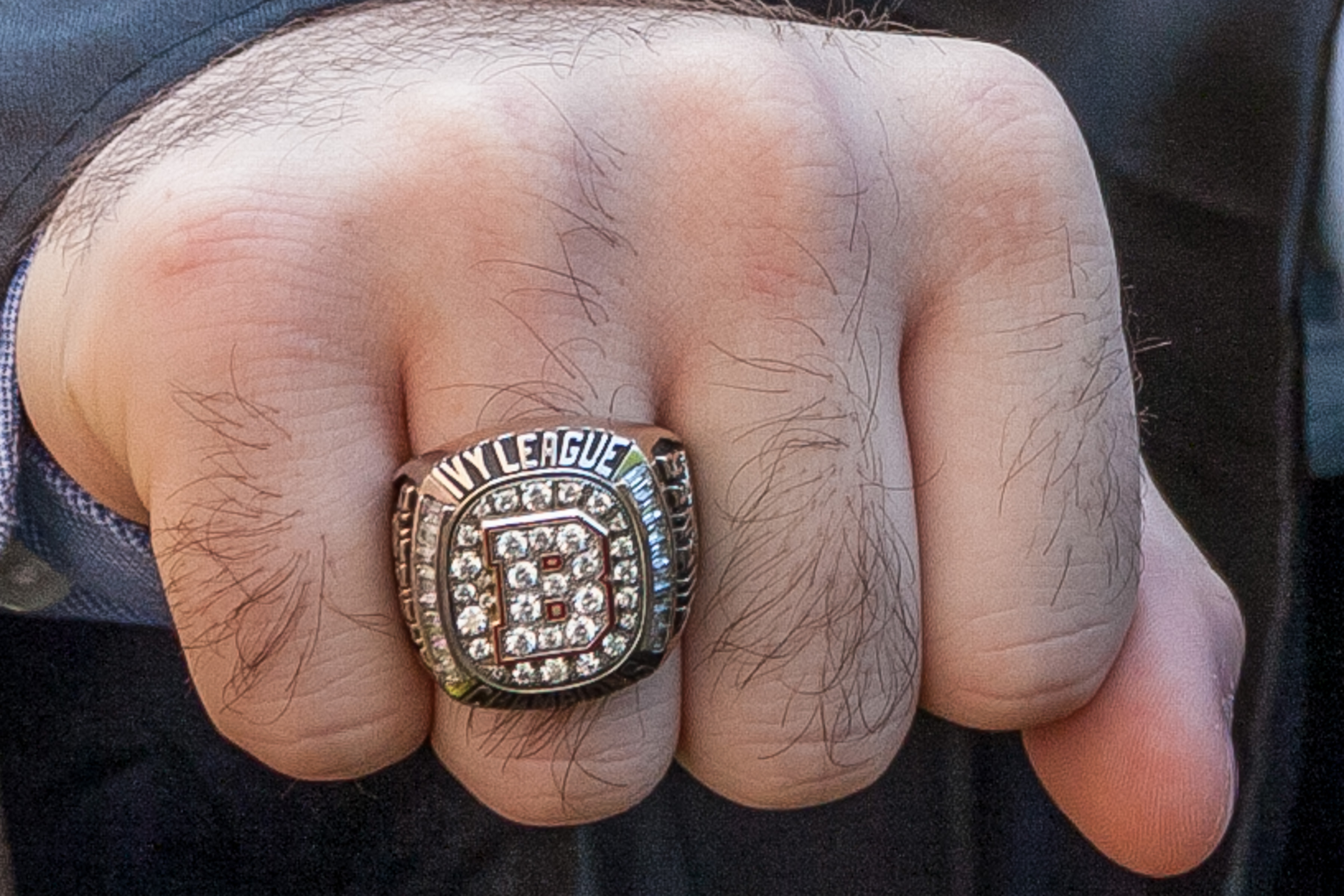
A player shows off their 2005 Ivy League Championship ring

The 2005 Brown Bears football team was an American football team that represented Brown University during the 2005 NCAA Division I-AA football season. Brown won the Ivy League championship.

In their eighth season under head coach Phil Estes, the Bears compiled a 9–1 record and outscored opponents 368 to 218. James Frazier, Jamie Gasparella and Nick Hartigan were the team captains. Hartigan received the Ivy League Bushnell Cup in 2005.

The Bears' 6–1 conference record topped the Ivy League standings. They outscored Ivy opponents 252 to 166.

Brown was unranked to start the year, and did not enter the national top 25 until November. After closing out the year on an eight-game win streak, the Bears were ranked No. 15 in the final poll.

Brown played its home games at Brown Stadium in Providence, Rhode Island.

== Schedule ==
Date	Opponent	Rank	Site	Result	Attendance	Source
September 17	at Georgetown*		Multi-Sport Field; Washington, DC	W 34–3	3,500	
September 24	at No. 15 Harvard		Harvard Stadium; Boston, MA	L 35–38 ^{OT}	11,134	
October 1	Rhode Island*		Brown Stadium; Providence, RI (rivalry)	W 45–35	6,152	
October 8	Fordham*		Brown Stadium; Providence, RI	W 37–14	2,256	
October 15	Princeton		Brown Stadium; Providence, RI	W 31–28	5,031	
October 22	at Cornell		Schoellkopf Field; Ithaca, NY	W 38–24	4,212	
October 29	No. 25 Penn		Brown Stadium; Providence, RI	W 34–20	6,318	
November 5	at Yale	No. 22	Yale Bowl; New Haven, CT	W 38–21	21,719	
November 12	Dartmouth	No. 20	Brown Stadium; Providence, RI	W 24–14	8,122	
November 19	at Columbia	No. 18	Wien Stadium; New York, NY	W 52–21	6,705	
*Non-conference game; Rankings from The Sports Network Poll released prior to the game
