= 2005 Richmond Spiders football team =

American college football season

2005 Richmond Spiders football

Atlantic 10 co-champion

NCAA Division I-AA Quarterfinal, L 20–24 vs. Furman
- Conference: Atlantic 10 Conference

Ranking
- Sports Network: No. 8
- Record: 9–4 (7–1 A-10)
- Head coach: Dave Clawson (2nd season)
- Defensive coordinator: Russ Huesman (2nd season)
- Home stadium: University of Richmond Stadium

2005 Atlantic 10 Conference football standings
	Conf.			Overall
Team	W		L	W		L
North Division
No. 5 New Hampshire x+^	7	–	1	11	–	2
No. 19 UMass	6	–	2	7	–	4
Hofstra	5	–	3	8	–	4
Maine	3	–	5	5	–	6
Northeastern	2	–	6	3	–	9
Rhode Island	2	–	6	4	–	7
South Division
No. 8 Richmond x+^	7	–	1	9	–	4
No. 25 James Madison	5	–	3	7	–	4
Delaware	3	–	5	6	–	5
Towson	3	–	5	6	–	5
William & Mary	3	–	5	5	–	6
Villanova	2	–	6	4	–	7
+ – Conference co-champions; x – Division champion/co-champions; ^ – NCAA Division I-AA playoff participant; Rankings from The Sports Network poll

The 2005 Richmond Spiders football team represented the University of Richmond during the 2005 NCAA Division I-AA football season. Richmond competed as a member of the Atlantic 10 Conference (A-10) under second-year head football coach Dave Clawson and played its home games at University of Richmond Stadium.

Richmond finished the regular season with an 8–3 overall record and 7–1 record in conference play, sharing the A-10 title with the University of New Hampshire. The Spiders were awarded an at-large berth in the I-AA playoffs. The Spiders defeated third-seeded Hampton University in the first round of the playoffs, but fell in the quarterfinals to Furman University. The Spiders finished the season with a #8 national ranking according to The Sports Network's Division I-AA poll.

== Schedule ==
Date	Time	Opponent	Rank	Site	TV	Result	Attendance	Source
September 1	7:00 pm	No. 15 UMass		University of Richmond Stadium; Richmond, VA		L 6–19	6,040	
September 10	1:00 pm	at Lafayette*		Fisher Field; Easton, PA		L 0–7	5,274	
September 17	6:00 pm	at Maine		Alfond Stadium; Orono, ME	WABI	W 26–21	4,762	
September 24	7:00 pm	at Vanderbilt*		Vanderbilt Stadium; Nashville, TN		L 13–37	38,446	
October 8	1:00 pm	Villanova		University of Richmond Stadium; Richmond, VA		W 38–20	3,508	
October 15	12:00 pm	No. 22 Delaware		UR Stadium; Richmond, VA		W 20–10	3,115	
October 22	1:00 pm	No. 23 Hofstra		University of Richmond Stadium; Richmond, VA		W 43–37 ^{2OT}	4,385	
October 29	3:00 pm	at No. 17 James Madison		Bridgeforth Stadium; Harrisonburg, VA		W 18–15	15,124	
November 5	3:00 pm	VMI*^{†}	No. 23	University of Richmond Stadium; Richmond, VA		W 38–3	9,853	
November 12	12:00 pm	at Towson	No. 18	Johnny Unitas Stadium; Towson, MD	CSNMA	W 48–21	3,472	
November 19	1:00 pm	William & Mary	No. 17	University of Richmond Stadium; Richmond, VA (I-64 Bowl)		W 41–7	8,960	
November 26	8:00 pm	at No. 2 Hampton*	No. 12	Armstrong Stadium; Hampton, VA (NCAA Division I-AA First Round)	ESPNU	W 38–10	5,343	
December 3	6:00 pm	No. 3 Furman*	No. 12	University of Richmond Stadium; Richmond, VA (NCAA Division I-AA Quarterfinals)	ESPNU, ESPNGP	L 20–24	6,603	
*Non-conference game; ^{†}Homecoming; Rankings from The Sports Network Poll released prior to the game; All times are in Eastern time

== Roster ==
2005 Richmond Spiders football team roster
Players			Coaches
Offense: Pos. / # / Name / Class; QB / 3 / Stacy Tutt / Sr	Defense: Pos. / # / Name / Class	Special teams: Pos. / # / Name / Class	Head coach: Dave Clawson; Coordinators/assistant coaches Legend: (C) Team captain; (S) Suspended; (I) Ineligible; Injured; Redshirt; Roster
