= 2005 Fordham Rams football team =

American college football season

2005 Fordham Rams football
- Conference: Patriot League
- Record: 2–9 (2–4 Patriot)
- Head coach: Ed Foley (2nd season)
- Captains: James Caffarello; Edward Gordon; Marcus Taylor
- Home stadium: Coffey Field

2005 Patriot League football standings
	Conf.			Overall
Team	W		L	W		L
No. 21 Lafayette +^	5	–	1	8	–	4
No. 23 Colgate +^	5	–	1	8	–	4
Lehigh	4	–	2	8	–	3
Holy Cross	3	–	3	6	–	5
Georgetown	2	–	4	4	–	7
Fordham	2	–	4	2	–	9
Bucknell	0	–	6	1	–	10
+ – Conference co-champions; ^ – NCAA Division I-AA playoff participant; Rankings from The Sports Network poll

The 2005 Fordham Rams football team was an American football team that represented Fordham University during the 2005 NCAA Division I-AA football season. Fordham tied for second-to-last in the Patriot League.

In their second and final year under head coach Ed Foley, the Rams compiled a 2–9 record. James Caffarello, Edward Gordon and Marcus Taylor were the team captains.

The Rams were outscored 326 to 150. Their 2–4 conference record tied for fifth out of seven in the Patriot League standings.

Fordham played its home games at Jack Coffey Field on the university's Rose Hill campus in The Bronx, in New York City.

== Schedule ==
Date	Opponent	Site	Result	Attendance	Source
September 3	at Rhode Island*	Meade Stadium; Kingston, RI	L 20–34	1,867	
September 10	at Duquesne*	Rooney Field; Pittsburgh, PA	L 13–30		
September 17	Columbia^{†}*	Coffey Field; Bronx, NY (Liberty Cup)	L 17–23	6,912	
September 24	at Lafayette	Fisher Field; Easton, PA	L 10–27	6,257	
October 8	at Brown*	Brown Stadium; Providence, RI	L 14–37	2,256	
October 15	at Colgate	Andy Kerr Stadium; Hamilton, NY	L 0–23		
October 22	at Georgetown	Multi-Sport Field; Washington, DC	L 21–24	3,000	
October 29	Holy Cross^{†}	Coffey Field; Bronx, NY (rivalry)	W 24–20	5,771	
November 5	Bucknell	Coffey Field; Bronx, NY	W 28–21	3,766	
November 12	No. 13 Lehigh	Coffey Field; Bronx, NY	L 3–40	3,983	
November 19	Albany*	Coffey Field; Bronx, NY	L 0–41	2,367	
*Non-conference game; ^{†}Homecoming; Rankings from The Sports Network Poll released prior to the game
