= 2005 New Hampshire Wildcats football team =

American college football season

2005 New Hampshire Wildcats football

A-10 co-champion Lambert Cup winner

NCAA Division I-AA Quarterfinal, L 21–24 vs. Northern Iowa
- Conference: Atlantic 10 Conference
- North Division

Ranking
- Sports Network: No. 5
- Record: 11–2 (7–1 A-10)
- Head coach: Sean McDonnell (7th season)
- Offensive coordinator: Chip Kelly (7th season)
- Defensive coordinator: Mike Dawson (2nd season)
- Home stadium: Cowell Stadium

2005 Atlantic 10 Conference football standings
	Conf.			Overall
Team	W		L	W		L
North Division
No. 5 New Hampshire x+^	7	–	1	11	–	2
No. 19 UMass	6	–	2	7	–	4
Hofstra	5	–	3	8	–	4
Maine	3	–	5	5	–	6
Northeastern	2	–	6	3	–	9
Rhode Island	2	–	6	4	–	7
South Division
No. 8 Richmond x+^	7	–	1	9	–	4
No. 25 James Madison	5	–	3	7	–	4
Delaware	3	–	5	6	–	5
Towson	3	–	5	6	–	5
William & Mary	3	–	5	5	–	6
Villanova	2	–	6	4	–	7
+ – Conference co-champions; x – Division champion/co-champions; ^ – NCAA Division I-AA playoff participant; Rankings from The Sports Network poll

The 2005 New Hampshire Wildcats football team represented the University of New Hampshire during the 2005 NCAA Division I-AA football season. It was the program's 111th season and they finished as Atlantic 10 Conference (A-10) co-champions with Richmond after posting a 7–1 record in conference play. The Wildcats earned a berth as the #1 seed into the 16-team Division I-AA playoffs, but were upset in the quarterfinals by Northern Iowa, 21–24. New Hampshire was led by seventh-year head coach Sean McDonnell.

== Schedule ==
Date	Time	Opponent	Rank	Site	TV	Result	Attendance
September 3	9:00 p.m.	at UC Davis*	No. 7	Toomey Field; Davis, CA		W 17–13	6,375
September 17	3:00 p.m.	at Towson	No. 3	Johnny Unitas Stadium; Towson, MD		W 62–21	3,014
September 24	12:00 p.m.	Dartmouth*	No. 2	Cowell Stadium; Durham, NH (rivalry)		W 49–20	7,145
October 1	12:30 p.m.	Villanova	No. 1	Cowell Stadium; Durham, NH	CN8	W 45–17	8,012
October 8	1:00 p.m.	at No. 17 William & Mary	No. 1	Zable Stadium; Williamsburg, VA		L 10–42	4,149
October 15	12:00 p.m.	Rhode Island^{†}	No. 8	Cowell Stadium; Durham, NH		W 53–9	5,596
October 22	12:00 p.m.	Northeastern	No. 5	Cowell Stadium; Durham, NH		W 52–21	7,317
October 29	12:00 p.m.	at No. 7 UMass	No. 4	McGuirk Stadium; Hadley, MA (rivalry)		W 34–28	12,359
November 5	1:00 p.m.	at Hofstra	No. 2	James M. Shuart Stadium; Hempstead, NY		W 29–26	4,215
November 12	12:00 p.m.	Iona*	No. 1	Cowell Stadium; Durham, NH		W 56–0	5,345
November 19	12:00 p.m.	at Maine	No. 1	Alfond Stadium; Orono, ME (Battle for the Brice–Cowell Musket)		W 59–47	8,606
November 26	12:00 p.m.	No. 24 Colgate*	No. 1	Cowell Stadium; Durham, NH (NCAA Division I-AA First Round)	ESPN2	W 55–21	7,806
December 3	11:00 a.m.	No. 2 Northern Iowa*	No. 1	Cowell Stadium; Durham, NH (NCAA Division I-AA Quarterfinal)	ESPNGP	L 21–24	8,448
*Non-conference game; ^{†}Homecoming; Rankings from The Sports Network Poll released prior to the game; All times are in Eastern time

== Awards and honors ==
- First Team All-America – David Ball (AFCA, Associated Press, Walter Camp); Ricky Santos (Walter Camp); Jonathan Williams (Associated Press, Walter Camp)
- First Team All-Atlantic 10 – David Ball, Ricky Santos, Jonathan Williams
- Walter Payton Award – Ricky Santos
- Atlantic 10 Offensive Player of the Year – Ricky Santos
- Eddie Robinson Award – Sean McDonnell
