= 2005 Lehigh Mountain Hawks football team =

American college football season

2005 Lehigh Mountain Hawks football
- Conference: Patriot League
- Record: 8–3 (4–2 Patriot)
- Head coach: Pete Lembo (5th season)
- Defensive coordinator: Gerard Wilcher (1st season)
- Captains: Mark Borda; Kaloma Cardwell; Anthony Graziani; Adam Selmasska
- Home stadium: Goodman Stadium

2005 Patriot League football standings
	Conf.			Overall
Team	W		L	W		L
No. 21 Lafayette +^	5	–	1	8	–	4
No. 23 Colgate +^	5	–	1	8	–	4
Lehigh	4	–	2	8	–	3
Holy Cross	3	–	3	6	–	5
Georgetown	2	–	4	4	–	7
Fordham	2	–	4	2	–	9
Bucknell	0	–	6	1	–	10
+ – Conference co-champions; ^ – NCAA Division I-AA playoff participant; Rankings from The Sports Network poll

The 2005 Lehigh Mountain Hawks football team was an American football team that represented Lehigh University during the 2005 NCAA Division I-AA football season. Lehigh finished third in the Patriot League.

In their fifth and final year under head coach Pete Lembo, the Mountain Hawks compiled an 8–3 record. Mark Borda, Kaloma Cardwell, Anthony Graziani and Adam Selmasska were the team captains.

The Mountain Hawks outscored opponents 399 to 228. Their 4–2 conference record placed third out of seven in the Patriot League.

The Mountain Hawks were ranked No. 14 in the preseason Division I-AA national poll. They remained in the top 25, ranging as high as No. 11 and as low as No. 20, until the final week of the regular season. A loss to unranked archrival Lafayette dropped Lehigh out of the final poll.

Lehigh played its home games at Goodman Stadium on the university's Goodman Campus in Bethlehem, Pennsylvania.

== Schedule ==
Date	Opponent	Rank	Site	Result	Attendance	Source
September 3	Monmouth*	No. 14	Goodman Stadium; Bethlehem, PA	W 54–26	8,063	
September 10	at No. 10 Delaware*	No. 14	Delaware Stadium; Newark, DE	L 33–34	22,537	
September 24	at VMI*	No. 13	Alumni Memorial Field; Lexington, VA	W 28–26	6,524	
October 1	at Harvard*	No. 11	Harvard Stadium; Boston, MA	W 49–24	9,339	
October 8	Holy Cross	No. 10	Goodman Stadium; Bethlehem, PA	L 10–13	5,713	
October 15	Yale*	No. 20	Goodman Stadium; Bethlehem, PA	W 28–21 ^{OT}	10,414	
October 22	at Bucknell	No. 21	Christy Mathewson–Memorial Stadium; Lewisburg, PA	W 42–10	2,695	
October 29	at Colgate	No. 16	Andy Kerr Stadium; Hamilton, NY	W 50–34		
November 5	Georgetown	No. 13	Goodman Stadium; Bethlehem, PA	W 46–14	13,071	
November 12	at Fordham	No. 13	Coffey Field; Bronx, NY	W 40–3	3,983	
November 19	Lafayette	No. 12	Goodman Stadium; Bethlehem, PA (The Rivalry)	L 19–23	16,017	
*Non-conference game; Rankings from The Sports Network Poll released prior to the game
