= 2005 Rhode Island Rams football team =

American college football season

2005 Rhode Island Rams football
- Conference: Atlantic 10 Conference
- North Division
- Record: 4–7 (2–6 A-10)
- Head coach: Tim Stowers (6th season)
- Offensive coordinator: Harold Nichols (6th season)
- Defensive coordinator: Jeff McInerney (2nd season)
- Home stadium: Meade Stadium

2005 Atlantic 10 Conference football standings
	Conf.			Overall
Team	W		L	W		L
North Division
No. 5 New Hampshire x+^	7	–	1	11	–	2
No. 19 UMass	6	–	2	7	–	4
Hofstra	5	–	3	8	–	4
Maine	3	–	5	5	–	6
Northeastern	2	–	6	3	–	9
Rhode Island	2	–	6	4	–	7
South Division
No. 8 Richmond x+^	7	–	1	9	–	4
No. 25 James Madison	5	–	3	7	–	4
Delaware	3	–	5	6	–	5
Towson	3	–	5	6	–	5
William & Mary	3	–	5	5	–	6
Villanova	2	–	6	4	–	7
+ – Conference co-champions; x – Division champion/co-champions; ^ – NCAA Division I-AA playoff participant; Rankings from The Sports Network poll

The 2005 Rhode Island Rams football team was an American football team that represented the University of Rhode Island in the Atlantic 10 Conference during the 2005 NCAA Division I-AA football season. In their sixth season under head coach Tim Stowers, the Rams compiled a 4–7 record (2–6 against conference opponents) and finished in a tie for last place in the North Division of the Atlantic 10 Conference.

== Schedule ==
Date	Opponent	Site	Result	Attendance	Source
September 3	Fordham*	Meade Stadium; Kingston, RI	W 34–20	1,867	
September 10	at Central Connecticut*	Arute Field; New Britain, CT	W 56–10	3,259	
September 17	No. 7 William & Mary	Meade Stadium; Kingston, RI	W 48–29	3,303	
September 24	at No. 24 UMass	McGuirk Stadium; Hadley, MA	L 6–14	15,314	
October 1	at Brown*	Brown Stadium; Providence, RI (rivalry)	L 35–45	6,152	
October 8	Towson^{†}	Meade Stadium; Kingston, RI	L 14–23	2,508	
October 15	at No. 8 New Hampshire	Cowell Stadium; Durham, NH	L 9–53	5,596	
October 22	at Villanova	Villanova Stadium; Villanova, PA	W 48–30	5,109	
October 29	Hofstra	Meade Stadium; Kingston, RI	L 24–38	3,987	
November 12	at Maine	Alfond Stadium; Orono, ME	L 24–27 ^{OT}	5,050	
November 19	Northeastern	Meade Stadium; Kingston, RI	L 14–17	2,570	
*Non-conference game; ^{†}Homecoming; Rankings from The Sports Network Poll released prior to the game

== Personnel ==
=== Roster ===
2005 Rhode Island Rams football team roster
Players
Coaches
Offense

Pos.	#	Name	Class
RB	5	Jerell Jones	Jr
QB	7	Jayson Davis	Sr
WR	8	Jordan Bowers	Sr
RB	9	Jeff West	Sr
QB	10	Marcel Roberson	Fr
QB	13	Derek Cassidy	Fr
QB	14	Sean Arlan	Fr
QB	15	John Butler	Fr
RB	20	Josh Mason	Fr
RB	21	Calvin Poole	Sr
RB	22	Chad Campbell	Jr
RB	23	Andrew Varner	Fr
RB	28	Jimmy Hughes	Fr
RB	32	Drew Romagnoli	Fr
RB	35	Joe Bellini	Fr
RB	37	Joe Casey	Fr
RB	45	Johnathan Pitt-Coombs	Fr
OT	57	Mark Stolte	So
OT	60	Antal Keszthelyi	Fr
OT	62	Dan Wilson	So
OT	63	Andre Douglas	Fr
G	66	Drew Owens	So
OL	70	Joe Accinno	Fr
C	71	Steve Moll	So
OT	72	Shamal Lewis	Jr
G	73	Mike Cummings	So
OT	74	Frank Foti	Fr
G	76	Fran Dempsey	Fr
OL	77	Kane Crume	Jr
OL	79	Robert Crudup	Fr
WR	80	Ryan Jefferson	Fr
WR	82	Nick Delgrasso	Fr
WR	84	Keith Brown	Sr
WR	85	Chris Dickerson	Fr
TE	88	Kyle Edwards	Jr

Defense

Pos.	#	Name	Class
DB	1	Rod Chance	Sr
DB	2	Virgil Gray	Jr
DB	3	Raquan Pride	Jr
DB	4	Andre Anderson	Sr
DB	6	Ki'Ameer Johnson	Jr
DB	11	Tre Timbers	So
DB	18	Michael Bland	Fr
LB	19	Mizarian Farley	Jr
DB	24	Adrian Owen	So
DB	25	Gary Thomas	So
DB	29	Rajiv Lundy	Fr
LB	31	Adam Elmore	So
DB	33	Andrew Ferguson	Fr
LB	34	Chris Duncan	Jr
DB	38	Vladine Biosse	Sr
LB	42	Alfonso Dormu	Fr
DE	44	Keith Peacock	Sr
DE	48	Patrick Rowley	Fr
DB	49	Achille Yangambi	Sr
LB	50	Jeff Ball	Fr
LB	51	Larry Brantley	So
DE	52	Pat O'Neal	Sr
DL	53	Marc Toni	Fr
LB	54	Kevaughn Johnson-Henry	Fr
NG	55	Chad Waltrip	Jr
LB	56	Steve Marrella	Jr
NG	58	Nick Levy	So
LB	59	Damien Gresko	So
DE	75	Martin Smalls	Fr
DE	78	Dan Goodman	Fr
DE	87	David Wilson	Fr
LB	89	Matt Tyrrell	Jr
DE	90	Mike Stanton	So
DE	91	Paul Vellano	Fr
NG	92	Will Stanton	Sr
DT	93	Jason Green	Jr
DE	94	Dana Hart	Fr
DE	95	Dan Heffron	Jr
DT	97	Jon Hines	Jr
NG	98	Mike Paino	Sr

Special teams

Pos.	#	Name	Class
PK	16	Colin Gallagher	Jr
P	17	Bryan Giannecchini	So

Head coach

- Tim Stowers

Coordinators/assistant coaches

- Harold Nichols
  Offensive coordinator/quarterbacks/b-backs
- Jeff McInerney
  Defensive coordinator/safeties
- Jeff Weaver
  A-backs/wide receivers
- Dustin Buyer
  Offensive line
- Ashley Ingram
  Offensive line
- Tony Brinson
  Defensive line
- RaShan Frost
  Defensive line
- James Willis
  Linebackers
- Peter Quaweay
  Cornerbacks
- Terry Sauerbry
  Strength & conditioning

Legend

- (C) Team captain
- (S) Suspended
- (I) Ineligible
- Injured
- Redshirt

=== Coaching staff ===
Rhode Island Rams
Name	Position	Consecutive season at Rhode Island in current position	Previous position
Tim Stowers	Head coach	6th	Temple offensive coordinator (1999)
Harold Nichols	Offensive coordinator and quarterbacks coach	6th	Presbyterian wide receivers coach and kickers coach (1997–1999)
Jeff McInerney	Defensive coordinator and safeties coach	2nd	Tulsa assistant head coach, special teams coordinator, and linebackers coach (2000–2003)
Jeff Weaver	Wide receivers coach and a-backs coach	1st	Rhode Island a-backs coach (2004)
Dustin Bayer	Offensive line coach	1st	Rhode Island offensive lineman (player) (2001–2004)
Ashley Ingram	Offensive line coach	6th	West Alabama offensive line coach (1999)
Tony Brinson	Defensive line coach	2nd	Bryant special teams coordinator and defensive backs coach (2002–2003)
RaShan Frost	Defensive line coach	1st	Illinois State defensive line coach (2002–2004)
James Willis	Linebackers coach	1st	Birmingham Thunderbolts linebacker (player) (2001)
Peter Quaweay	Cornerbacks coach	2nd	Duquesne defensive backs coach (2003)
