= 2005 Lafayette Leopards football team =

American college football season

2005 Lafayette Leopards football

Patriot League co-champion

NCAA Division I-AA First Round, L 23–34 at Appalachian State
- Conference: Patriot League

Ranking
- Sports Network: No. 21
- FCS Coaches: No. 20
- Record: 8–4 (5–1 Patriot)
- Head coach: Frank Tavani (6th season)
- Offensive coordinator: Mike Faragalli (6th season)
- Offensive scheme: Multiple
- Defensive coordinator: John Loose (6th season)
- Base defense: 4–3
- Home stadium: Fisher Field

2005 Patriot League football standings
	Conf.			Overall
Team	W		L	W		L
No. 21 Lafayette +^	5	–	1	8	–	4
No. 23 Colgate +^	5	–	1	8	–	4
Lehigh	4	–	2	8	–	3
Holy Cross	3	–	3	6	–	5
Georgetown	2	–	4	4	–	7
Fordham	2	–	4	2	–	9
Bucknell	0	–	6	1	–	10
+ – Conference co-champions; ^ – NCAA Division I-AA playoff participant; Rankings from The Sports Network poll

The 2005 Lafayette Leopards football team represented Lafayette College as a member of the Patriot League during the 2005 NCAA Division I-AA football season. Led by sixth-year head coach Frank Tavani, the Leopards compiled an overall record of 8–4 with a mark of 5–1 in conference play, sharing the Patriot League title with Colgate. Lafayette advanced to the NCAA Division I-AA Football Championship playoffs, where the Leopards lost in the first round to Appalachian State. Lafayette played home games at Fisher Field in Easton, Pennsylvania.

All games were televised on the Lafayette Sports Network (LSN).

== Schedule ==
Date	Time	Opponent	Rank	Site	TV	Result	Attendance	Source
September 3	6:00 p.m.	at Marist*		Leonidoff Field; Poughkeepsie, NY	LSN	W 40–21	2,891	
September 10	1:00 p.m.	Richmond*		Fisher Field; Easton, Pennsylvania	LSN	W 7–0	5,274	
September 17	1:00 p.m.	Princeton*		Fisher Field; Easton, PA	LSN	L 21–23	4,915	
September 24	1:00 p.m.	Fordham		Fisher Field; Easton, PA	LSN	W 27–10	6,257	
October 1	1:00 p.m.	at Georgetown		Multi-Sport Field; Washington, DC	LSN	W 12–7	2,143	
October 8	1:00 p.m.	Columbia*		Fisher Field; Easton, PA	LSN	W 14–7	1,500	
October 15	1:00 p.m.	Harvard*^{†}		Fisher Field; Easton, PA	LSN	L 17–24	8,983	
October 29	1:00 p.m.	Bucknell		Fisher Field; Easton, PA	LSN	W 33–20	4,331	
November 5	12:30 p.m.	Colgate		Fisher Field; Easton, PA	LSN	L 15–18	7,683	
November 12	12:30 p.m.	at Holy Cross		Fitton Field; Worcester, MA	LSN	W 41–21	6,179	
November 19	12:30 p.m.	at No. 12 Lehigh		Goodman Stadium; Bethlehem, PA (The Rivalry)	LSN	W 23–19	16,017	
November 26	2:00 p.m.	at No. 5 Appalachian State*	No. 25	Kidd Brewer Stadium; Boone, NC (NCAA Division I-AA First Round)	LSN	L 23–34	6,327	
*Non-conference game; ^{†}Homecoming; Rankings from The Sports Network Poll released prior to the game; All times are in Eastern time
