= 2005 Penn Quakers football team =

American college football season

2005 Penn Quakers football
- Conference: Ivy League
- Record: 5–5 (3–4 Ivy)
- Head coach: Al Bagnoli (14th season)
- Offensive coordinator: Andy Coen (6th season)
- Defensive coordinator: Ray Priore (8th season)
- Home stadium: Franklin Field

2005 Ivy League football standings
| | Conf. | | | Overall |
| Team | W | | L | W | | L |
|---|---|---|---|---|---|---|
| No. 15 Brown $ | 6 | – | 1 | 9 | – | 1 |
| Princeton | 5 | – | 2 | 7 | – | 3 |
| Harvard | 5 | – | 2 | 7 | – | 3 |
| Yale | 4 | – | 3 | 4 | – | 6 |
| Cornell | 4 | – | 3 | 6 | – | 4 |
| Penn | 3 | – | 4 | 5 | – | 5 |
| Dartmouth | 1 | – | 6 | 2 | – | 8 |
| Columbia | 0 | – | 7 | 2 | – | 8 |
$ – Conference champion; Rankings from The Sports Network poll

The 2005 Penn Quakers football team represented the University of Pennsylvania in the 2005 NCAA Division I-AA football season. It was the 129th season of play for the Quakers. They were led by 14th-year head coach Al Bagnoli and played their home games at Franklin Field in Philadelphia. They finished sixth in the Ivy League, with an overall record of 5–5 overall and a league record of 3–4.

== Schedule ==
| Date | Time | Opponent | Rank | Site | TV | Result | Attendance | Source |
|---|---|---|---|---|---|---|---|---|
| September 17 | 3:30 p.m. | Duquesne* | | Franklin Field; Philadelphia, PA | | W 41–14 | 8,672 | |
| September 24 | 7:00 p.m. | Villanova* | | Franklin Field; Philadelphia, PA | CN8 | L 24–28 | 23,257 | |
| October 1 | 12:30 p.m. | at Dartmouth | | Memorial Field; Hanover, NH | | W 26–9 | 6,710 | |
| October 8 | 3:30 p.m. | Bucknell* | | Franklin Field; Philadelphia, PA | CN8 | W 53–7 | 5,245 | |
| October 15 | 1:00 p.m. | at Columbia | | Wien Stadium; New York, NY | | W 44–16 | 10,131 | |
| October 22 | 3:30 p.m. | Yale | | Franklin Field; Philadelphia, PA | CN8 | W 38–21 | 9,826 | |
| October 29 | 1:00 p.m. | at Brown | No. 25 | Brown Stadium; Providence, RI | | L 20–34 | 6,318 | |
| November 5 | 12:00 p.m. | Princeton^{†} | | Franklin Field; Philadelphia, PA (rivalry) | | L 13–30 | 20,036 | |
| November 12 | 12:00 p.m. | at Harvard | | Harvard Stadium; Boston, MA (rivalry) | YES | L 3–29 | 15,688 | |
| November 19 | 12:00 p.m. | Cornell | | Franklin Field; Philadelphia, PA (rivalry) | | L 7–16 | 6,933 | |
*Non-conference game; ^{†}Homecoming; Rankings from The Sports Network Poll released prior to the game; All times are in Eastern time
