= 2005 Villanova Wildcats football team =

American college football season

2005 Villanova Wildcats football
- Conference: Atlantic 10 Conference
- South Division
- Record: 4–7 (2–6 A-10)
- Head coach: Andy Talley (21st season)
- Offensive coordinator: Sam Venuto (7th season)
- Offensive scheme: Multiple spread
- Defensive coordinator: Mark Reardon (1st season)
- Base defense: 4–2–5
- Home stadium: Villanova Stadium

2005 Atlantic 10 Conference football standings
	Conf.			Overall
Team	W		L	W		L
North Division
No. 5 New Hampshire x+^	7	–	1	11	–	2
No. 19 UMass	6	–	2	7	–	4
Hofstra	5	–	3	8	–	4
Maine	3	–	5	5	–	6
Northeastern	2	–	6	3	–	9
Rhode Island	2	–	6	4	–	7
South Division
No. 8 Richmond x+^	7	–	1	9	–	4
No. 25 James Madison	5	–	3	7	–	4
Delaware	3	–	5	6	–	5
Towson	3	–	5	6	–	5
William & Mary	3	–	5	5	–	6
Villanova	2	–	6	4	–	7
+ – Conference co-champions; x – Division champion/co-champions; ^ – NCAA Division I-AA playoff participant; Rankings from The Sports Network poll

The 2005 Villanova Wildcats football team represented Villanova University in the 2005 NCAA Division I FCS football season as a member of the Atlantic 10 Conference (A-10). The Wildcats were led by 21st year head coach Andy Talley and played their home games at Villanova Stadium. They finished the season with an overall record of four wins and seven losses (4–7, 2–6 in the A-10).

== Schedule ==
Date	Time	Opponent	Site	TV	Result	Attendance
September 10	3:30 pm	at Rutgers*	Rutgers Stadium; Piscataway, NJ		L 6–38	32,412
September 17	7:00 pm	Northeastern	Villanova Stadium; Villanova, PA	CN8	W 38–20	10,511
September 24	7:00 pm	at Penn*	Franklin Field; Philadelphia, PA	CN8	W 28–24	23,257
October 1	12:30 pm	at No. 1 New Hampshire	Cowell Stadium; Durham, NH	CN8	L 17–45	8,012
October 8	1:00 pm	at Richmond	UR Stadium; Richmond, VA		L 20–38	3,508
October 15	1:00 pm	at Bucknell*	Christy Mathewson–Memorial Stadium; Lewisburg, PA		W 38–10	3,259
October 22	3:00 pm	Rhode Island^{†}	Villanova Stadium; Villanova PA		L 30–48	5,109
October 29	6:00 pm	No. 9 William & Mary	Villanova Stadium; Villanova PA		W 35–21	6,207
November 5	1:00 pm	at Towson*	Johnny Unitas Stadium; Towson MD		L 19–40	4,027
November 12	1:30 pm	at No. 25 James Madison	Bridgeforth Stadium; Harrisonburg, VA		L 13–28	10,984
November 19	1:00 pm	Delaware	Villanova Stadium; Villanova, PA (rivalry)	CN8	L 13–38	9,611
*Non-conference game; ^{†}Homecoming; Rankings from The Sports Network Poll released prior to the game; All times are in Eastern time
