= 2005 Yale Bulldogs football team =

American college football season

2005 Yale Bulldogs football
- Conference: Ivy League
- Record: 4–6 (4–3 Ivy)
- Head coach: Jack Siedlecki (9th season)
- Home stadium: Yale Bowl

2005 Ivy League football standings
	Conf.			Overall
Team	W		L	W		L
No. 15 Brown $	6	–	1	9	–	1
Princeton	5	–	2	7	–	3
Harvard	5	–	2	7	–	3
Yale	4	–	3	4	–	6
Cornell	4	–	3	6	–	4
Penn	3	–	4	5	–	5
Dartmouth	1	–	6	2	–	8
Columbia	0	–	7	2	–	8
$ – Conference champion; Rankings from The Sports Network poll

The 2005 Yale Bulldogs football team represented Yale University in the 2005 NCAA Division I-AA football season. The Bulldogs were led by ninth year head coach Jack Siedlecki, played their home games at the Yale Bowl and finished tied for fourth in the Ivy League with a 4–3 record, 4–6 overall.

== Schedule ==
Date	Opponent	Site	Result	Attendance	Source
September 17	at San Diego*	Torero Stadium; San Diego, CA	L 14–17	3,266	
September 24	Cornell	Yale Bowl; New Haven, CT	W 37–17	18,188	
October 1	Holy Cross*	Yale Bowl; New Haven, CT	L 19–22	12,793	
October 8	Dartmouth	Yale Bowl; New Haven, CT	W 13–0	2,420	
October 15	at Lehigh*	Goodman Stadium; Bethlehem, PA	L 21–28 ^{OT}	10,414	
October 22	at Penn	Franklin Field; Philadelphia, PA	L 21–38	9,826	
October 29	at Columbia	Wien Stadium; New York, NY	W 37–3	2,025	
November 5	Brown	Yale Bowl; New Haven, CT	L 21–38	21,719	
November 12	at Princeton	Palmer Stadium; Princeton, NJ (rivalry)	W 21–14	18,265	
November 19	Harvard	Yale Bowl; New Haven, CT (The Game)	L 24–30 ^{3OT}	53,213	
*Non-conference game

== Roster ==
2005 Yale Bulldogs football team roster
Players
Coaches
Offense

Pos.	#	Name	Class
TE	1	Alex Faherty	Sr
QB	9	Jeff Mroz	Sr

Defense

Pos.	#	Name	Class

Special teams

Pos.	#	Name	Class

Head coach

- Jack Siedlecki

Coordinators/assistant coaches

Legend

- (C) Team captain
- (S) Suspended
- (I) Ineligible
- Injured
- Redshirt

Roster
