= 2005 Harvard Crimson football team =

American college football season

2005 Harvard Crimson football
- Conference: Ivy League
- Record: 7–3 (5–2 Ivy)
- Head coach: Tim Murphy (12th season)
- Offensive coordinator: Dave Cecchini (3rd season)
- Offensive scheme: Spread
- Defensive coordinator: Kevin Doherty (4th season)
- Base defense: 3–4
- Home stadium: Harvard Stadium

2005 Ivy League football standings
	Conf.			Overall
Team	W		L	W		L
No. 15 Brown $	6	–	1	9	–	1
Princeton	5	–	2	7	–	3
Harvard	5	–	2	7	–	3
Yale	4	–	3	4	–	6
Cornell	4	–	3	6	–	4
Penn	3	–	4	5	–	5
Dartmouth	1	–	6	2	–	8
Columbia	0	–	7	2	–	8
$ – Conference champion; Rankings from The Sports Network poll

The 2005 Harvard Crimson football team represented Harvard University in the 2005 NCAA Division I-AA football season. Harvard finished the season with an overall record of 7–3, placing in a tie for second among Ivy league teams with a conference mark of 5–2.

== Schedule ==
Date	Opponent	Site	Result	Attendance	Source
September 17	at Holy Cross*	Fitton Field; Worcester, MA	W 31–21	8,238	
September 24	Brown	Harvard Stadium; Boston, MA	W 38–35	11,134	
October 1	Lehigh*	Harvard Stadium; Boston, MA	L 24-49	9,339	
October 8	at Cornell	Schoellkopf Field; Ithaca, NY	L 13–27	5,250	
October 15	at Lafayette*	Fisher Field; Easton, PA	W 24–17	8,983	
October 22	Princeton	Harvard Stadium; Boston, MA (rivalry)	L 24–27	12,023	
October 29	Dartmouth	Harvard Stadium; Boston, MA (rivalry)	W 42–14	12,661	
November 5	at Columbia	Wien Stadium; New York, NY	W 55–7	2,354	
November 12	Penn	Harvard Stadium; Boston, MA (rivalry)	W 29–3	15,688	
November 19	at Yale	Yale Bowl; New Haven, CT (The Game)	W 30–24 ^{3OT}	53,213	
*Non-conference game
