= 2005 Stony Brook Seawolves football team =

American college football season

2005 Stony Brook Seawolves football

NEC co-champion
- Conference: Northeast Conference
- Record: 6–5 (5–2 NEC)
- Head coach: Sam Kornhauser (22nd season)
- Offensive coordinator: Paul McGonagle (2nd season)
- Defensive coordinator: Vince Sinagra (2nd season)
- Home stadium: Kenneth P. LaValle Stadium

2005 Northeast Conference football standings
	Conf.			Overall
Team	W		L	W		L
Central Connecticut State +	5	–	2	7	–	4
Stony Brook +	5	–	2	6	–	5
Monmouth	4	–	3	6	–	4
Albany	4	–	3	5	–	6
Wagner	3	–	4	6	–	5
Sacred Heart	3	–	4	4	–	6
Saint Francis (PA)	3	–	4	3	–	8
Robert Morris	1	–	6	2	–	8
+ – Conference co-champions

The 2005 Stony Brook Seawolves football team represented Stony Brook University as a member of the Northeast Conference (NEC) during the 2005 NCAA Division I-AA football season. Led by Sam Kornhauser in his 22nd and final season as head coach, the Seawolves compiled an overall record of 6–5 with a mark of 5–2 in conference place, sharing the NEC title with Central Connecticut State. Stony Brook played home games at Kenneth P. LaValle Stadium in Stony Brook, New York.

== Schedule ==
Date	Time	Opponent	Site	Result	Attendance	Source
September 10	6:00 p.m.	Bucknell*	Kenneth P. LaValle Stadium; Stony Brook, NY	W 21–18	4,101	
September 17	7:00 p.m.	at Hofstra*	James M. Shuart Stadium; Hempstead, NY (Battle of Long Island)	L 0–55	5,347	
September 24	2:00 p.m.	Georgetown*	Kenneth P. LaValle Stadium; Stony Brook, NY	L 7–10	6,028	
October 1	1:00 p.m.	Monmouth	Kenneth P. LaValle Stadium; Stony Brook, NY	L 7–36	2,534	
October 8	4:00 p.m.	at Albany	University Field; Albany, NY (rivalry)	W 7–3	1,121	
October 15	1:00 p.m.	Saint Francis (PA)	Kenneth P. LaValle Stadium; Stony Brook, NY	W 47–29	2,631	
October 22	1:00 p.m.	at Sacred Heart	Campus Field; Fairfield, CT	L 14–21	2,252	
October 29	1:00 p.m.	at Robert Morris	Joe Walton Stadium; Moon Township, PA	W 38–37	1,439	
November 5	1:00 p.m.	Wagner	Kenneth P. LaValle Stadium; Stony Brook, NY	W 28–10	2,760	
November 12	1:00 p.m.	at Central Connecticut State	Arute Field; New Britain, CT	W 23–21	3,209	
November 19	1:00 p.m.	Marist*	Kenneth P. LaValle Stadium; Stony Brook, NY	L 28–30	2,500	
*Non-conference game; All times are in Eastern time
