= 2005 James Madison Dukes football team =

American college football season

2005 James Madison Dukes football
- Conference: Atlantic 10 Conference
- South Division

Ranking
- Sports Network: No. 25
- Record: 7–4 (5–3 A–10)
- Head coach: Mickey Matthews (7th season)
- Offensive coordinator: Jeff Durden (2nd season)
- Defensive coordinator: George Barlow (2nd season)
- Home stadium: Bridgeforth Stadium

2005 Atlantic 10 Conference football standings
	Conf.			Overall
Team	W		L	W		L
North Division
No. 5 New Hampshire x+^	7	–	1	11	–	2
No. 19 UMass	6	–	2	7	–	4
Hofstra	5	–	3	8	–	4
Maine	3	–	5	5	–	6
Northeastern	2	–	6	3	–	9
Rhode Island	2	–	6	4	–	7
South Division
No. 8 Richmond x+^	7	–	1	9	–	4
No. 25 James Madison	5	–	3	7	–	4
Delaware	3	–	5	6	–	5
Towson	3	–	5	6	–	5
William & Mary	3	–	5	5	–	6
Villanova	2	–	6	4	–	7
+ – Conference co-champions; x – Division champion/co-champions; ^ – NCAA Division I-AA playoff participant; Rankings from The Sports Network poll

The 2005 James Madison Dukes football team represented James Madison University in the 2005 NCAA Division I-AA football season as a member of the Atlantic 10 Conference. The Dukes were led by seventh-year head coach Mickey Matthews, and played their home games at Bridgeforth Stadium in Harrisonburg, VA. The team finished the season with a 7–4 record.

Despite winning the 2004 National Championship, the Dukes could not sustain the same amount of success from the previous season, failing to reach the playoffs.

== Schedule ==
Date	Time	Opponent	Rank	Site	TV	Result	Attendance	Source
September 3	6:00 p.m.	Lock Haven*	No. 1	Bridgeforth Stadium; Harrisonburg, VA		W 56–0	14,673	
September 10	7:00 p.m.	at Coastal Carolina*	No. 1	Brooks Stadium; Conway, SC		L 27–31	8,533	
September 17	6:00 p.m.	Delaware State*	No. 8	Bridgeforth Stadium; Harrisonburg, VA		W 65–7	13,645	
October 1	3:30 p.m.	at No. 23 Hofstra	No. 6	James M. Shuart Stadium; Hempstead, NY		W 42–10	6,065	
October 8	1:30 p.m.	Maine	No. 5	Bridgeforth Stadium; Harrisonburg, VA		W 38–2	15,087	
October 15	12:00 p.m.	at No. 13 UMass	No. 4	McGuirk Stadium; Amherst, MA	CN8	L 7–10	4,476	
October 22	12:00 p.m.	at Delaware	No. 11	Delaware Stadium; Newark, DE (rivalry)	CSTV	L 28–34	22,059	
October 29	3:00 p.m.	Richmond	No. 17	Bridgeforth, Stadium; Harrisonburg, VA (rivalry)		L 15–18	15,124	
November 5	7:00 p.m.	at No. 16 William & Mary		Zable Stadium; Williamsburg, VA (rivalry)		W 30–29	12,287	
November 12	1:30 p.m.	Villanova	No. 25	Bridgeforth Stadium; Harrisonburg, VA		W 28–13	10,984	
November 19	1:30 p.m.	Towson		Bridgeforth Stadium; Harrisonburg, VA		W 55–14	11,635	
*Non-conference game; Rankings from The Sports Network Poll released prior to the game; All times are in Eastern time
