= 2005 La Salle Explorers football team =

American college football season

2005 La Salle Explorers football
- Conference: Metro Atlantic Athletic Conference
- Record: 4–7 (2–2 MAAC)
- Head coach: Phil Longo (2nd season)
- Home stadium: McCarthy Stadium

2005 Metro Atlantic Athletic Conference football standings
	Conf.			Overall
Team	W		L	W		L
Duquesne $	4	–	0	7	–	3
Marist	3	–	1	7	–	4
La Salle	2	–	2	4	–	7
Iona	1	–	3	3	–	7
Saint Peter's	0	–	4	1	–	9
$ – Conference champion

The 2005 La Salle Explorers football team was an American football team that represented La Salle University as a member of the Metro Atlantic Athletic Conference (MAAC) during the 2005 NCAA Division I-AA football season. In their second year under head coach Phil Longo, the Explorers compiled a 4–7 record.

== Schedule ==
Date	Opponent	Site	Result	Attendance	Source
September 3	at Wagner*	Wagner College Stadium; Staten Island, NY	L 27–41	2,640	
September 10	Monmouth*	McCarthy Stadium; Philadelphia, PA	L 27–65	1,705	
September 17	Ursinus*	McCarthy Stadium; Philadelphia, PA	L 12–13	450	
September 24	Saint Francis (PA)*	McCarthy Stadium; Philadelphia, PA	W 29–27	1,361	
October 1	Iona	McCarthy Stadium; Philadelphia, PA	W 39–32 ^{2OT}		
October 8	at Marist	Leonidoff Field; Poughkeepsie, NY	L 0–27		
October 15	at Catholic University*	Cardinal Stadium; Washington, DC	L 34–41	2,500	
October 22	at TCNJ*	Lions Stadium; Ewing, NJ	L 16–21		
October 29	Kean*	McCarthy Stadium; Philadelphia, PA	W 38–36	3,615	
November 5	at Duquesne	Arthur J. Rooney Athletic Field; Pittsburgh, PA	L 14–56		
November 12	Saint Peter's	McCarthy Stadium; Philadelphia, PA	W 30–14	2,154	
*Non-conference game
