= 2005 Cornell Big Red football team =

American college football season

2005 Cornell Big Red football
- Conference: Ivy League
- Record: 6–4 (4–3 Ivy)
- Head coach: Jim Knowles (2nd season)
- Offensive coordinator: Clayton Carlin (2nd season)
- Offensive scheme: Multiple
- Base defense: 4–3
- Captains: Kevin Boothe; Kevin Rex; Joel Sussman
- Home stadium: Schoellkopf Field

2005 Ivy League football standings
| | Conf. | | | Overall |
| Team | W | | L | W | | L |
|---|---|---|---|---|---|---|
| No. 15 Brown $ | 6 | – | 1 | 9 | – | 1 |
| Princeton | 5 | – | 2 | 7 | – | 3 |
| Harvard | 5 | – | 2 | 7 | – | 3 |
| Yale | 4 | – | 3 | 4 | – | 6 |
| Cornell | 4 | – | 3 | 6 | – | 4 |
| Penn | 3 | – | 4 | 5 | – | 5 |
| Dartmouth | 1 | – | 6 | 2 | – | 8 |
| Columbia | 0 | – | 7 | 2 | – | 8 |
$ – Conference champion; Rankings from The Sports Network poll

The 2005 Cornell Big Red football team represented Cornell University in the 2005 NCAA Division I-AA football season as a member of the Ivy League. They were led by second-year head coach Jim Knowles and played their home games at Schoellkopf Field. Cornell finished the season 6–4 overall and 4–3 in Ivy League play.

== Schedule ==
| Date | Time | Opponent | Site | Result | Attendance | Source |
|---|---|---|---|---|---|---|
| September 17 | 1:00 p.m. | Bucknell* | Schoellkopf Field; Ithaca, NY | W 24–7 | 12,723 | |
| September 24 | 1:00 p.m. | at Yale | Yale Bowl; New Haven, CT | L 17–37 | 18,188 | |
| October 1 | 1:00 p.m. | at Colgate* | Andy Kerr Stadium; Hamilton, NY (rivalry) | L 20–34 | 6,927 | |
| October 8 | 1:00 p.m. | Harvard | Schoellkopf Field; Ithaca, NY | W 27–13 | 5,250 | |
| October 15 | 1:00 p.m. | Georgetown*^{†} | Schoellkopf Field; Ithaca, NY | W 57–7 | 11,432 | |
| October 22 | 1:00 p.m. | Brown | Schoellkopf Field; Ithaca, NY | L 24–38 | 4,212 | |
| October 29 | 12:00 p.m. | at Princeton | Princeton Stadium; Princeton, NJ | L 17–20 | 9,315 | |
| November 5 | 12:30 p.m. | at Dartmouth | Memorial Field; Hanover, NH (rivalry) | W 21–10 | 5,017 | |
| November 12 | 1:00 p.m. | Columbia | Schoellkopf Field; Ithaca, NY (rivalry) | W 45–7 | 4,727 | |
| November 19 | 12:00 p.m. | at Penn | Franklin Field; Philadelphia, PA (rivalry) | W 16–7 | 6,933 | |
*Non-conference game; ^{†}Homecoming; All times are in Eastern time
