= Tim Stowers =

American football player and coach (born 1958)

Biographical details
- Born: February 8, 1958 (age 68); Union Springs, Alabama, U.S.

Playing career
- 1976–1978: Auburn
- Positions: Linebacker, offensive lineman, defensive lineman

Coaching career (HC unless noted)
- 1979–1981: Auburn (SA)
- 1982–1983: Auburn (JV)
- 1984: Jacksonville State (OL)
- 1985–1987: Georgia Southern (OL)
- 1988–1989: Georgia Southern (OC)
- 1990–1995: Georgia Southern
- 1998: Temple (OL)
- 1999: Temple (OC)
- 2000–2007: Rhode Island
- 2010–2012: Central Connecticut (AHC/OC)
- 2014–2017: Holmes (OC)
- 2018–2020: Southwest Mississippi
- 2021–?: Minor HS (AL) (assistant)

Head coaching record
- Overall: 84–80 (college); 1–23 (junior college)
- Tournaments: 6–2 (NCAA D-I-AA playoffs)

Accomplishments and honors

Championships
- 1 NCAA Division I-AA National (1990); 1 SoCon (1993)

Awards
- AFCA NCAA Division I-AA Coach of the Year (1990); SoCon Coach of the Year (1993); A-10 Coach of the Year (2001)

Timothy Stowers (born February 8, 1958) is an American football coach and former player. He served as the head football coach at the Georgia Southern University from 1990 to 1995 and the University of Rhode Island from 2000 to 2007, compiling a career college football coaching record of 84–80. His 1990 Georgia Southern Eagles football team won the NCAA Division I-AA Football Championship. Stowers was the head football coach at Southwest Mississippi Community College from 2018 to 2020.

== Early life and playing career ==
Stowers was born on February 8, 1958, in Union Springs, Alabama. He and his family moved to Huntsville, Alabama, early in his childhood.

Stowers and his father, the superintendent for the Huntsville School District in Alabama with three degrees from the University of Alabama, would regularly make the 150-mile trip from Huntsville to Tuscaloosa, Alabama, to watch Alabama football practices under Bear Bryant.

In 1970, when Stowers was 12, his father died of a heart attack at 46 years old.

Stowers played as a tight end, and all-state linebacker and center, for Grissom High School. Six years after Stower's father's death, he would then be rejected from his father's alma mater. In December 1975, following his senior season, he signed his letter-of-intent to play college football for Auburn, Alabama's longtime rival.

Stowers enrolled at Auburn for the 1976 school year as a six-foot-three, 218-pound. In Auburn's two-linebacker system under defensive coordinator P. W. Underwood, Stowers, as a true freshman, was in the mix as the fourth and fifth linebackers on the depth chart. In his sophomore season, Stowers became a regular in the defensive line after starting nose guard Harris Rabren was injured in the season opener. Stowers alternated between nose guard on defense and offensive guard on offense. He became the last Auburn player to play both ways as after the season, he transitioned solely to offensive line. In 1978, his junior year, Stowers was officially named starting right guard after an injury to incumbent Mark Callahan. Upon Stowers' promotion, offensive line coach Jim King described him as "very intelligent and can make adjustments faster than a lot of players...He came back in excellent shape, and we have confidence in his ability to take up some of the slack." At six-foot-two, 228-pounds, he was listed as one of the smallest offensive guards in the Southeastern Conference (SEC). Ahead of his senior season, Stowers suffered a major back injury, which resulted in a career-ending back surgery.

In May 1980, Stowers received his Bachelor of Physical Education from Auburn.

== Coaching career ==
Immediately after Stowers' injury, he joined the coaching staff for Auburn as a student assistant. In 1982, he was promoted to head junior varsity coach. Alongside his on-field coaching duties, he served as scout for the team. After eight seasons at Auburn, three as a player and five as a coach, Stowers earned his first full-time coaching job as he was hired as the offensive line coach for Jacksonville State under new head coach Joe Hollis. Hollis and Stowers worked alongside each other at Auburn as Hollis was a fellow assistant from 1978 to 1979.

In January 1985, after one season, Hollis resigned from Jacksonville State, leaving Stowers, and the rest of the coaching staff in limbo. After two months and the hiring of Bill Burgess, Stowers accepted the offensive line position under Erk Russell at Georgia Southern. In 1988, Stowers was promoted to offensive coordinator.

== Head coaching record ==
=== College ===
Year	Team	Overall	Conference	Standing	Bowl/playoffs
Georgia Southern Eagles (NCAA Division I-AA independent) (1990–1992)
1990	Georgia Southern	12–3			W NCAA Division I-AA Championship
1991	Georgia Southern	7–4			
1992	Georgia Southern	7–4			
Georgia Southern Eagles (Southern Conference) (1993–1995)
1993	Georgia Southern	10–3	7–1	1st	L NCAA Division I-AA Quarterfinal
1994	Georgia Southern	6–5	5–3	T–3rd	
1995	Georgia Southern	9–4	5–3	T–3rd	L NCAA Division I-AA Quarterfinal
Georgia Southern:		51–23	17–7		
Rhode Island Rams (Colonial Athletic Association) (2000–2007)
2000	Rhode Island	3–8	2–7	9th	
2001	Rhode Island	8–3	6–3	5th	
2002	Rhode Island	3–9	1–8	11th	
2003	Rhode Island	4–8	3–8	T–8th	
2004	Rhode Island	4–7	2–6	T–6th	
2005	Rhode Island	4–7	2–6	6th	
2006	Rhode Island	4–7	2–6	5th	
2007	Rhode Island	3–8	2–7	T–4th	
Rhode Island:		33–57	20–51		
Total:		84–80			
National championship Conference title Conference division title or championship game berth

=== Junior college ===
Year	Team	Overall	Conference	Standing	Bowl/playoffs
Southwest Mississippi Bears (Mississippi Association of Community and Junior Colleges) (2018–2021)
2018	Southwest Mississippi	1–8	0–6	7th (South)	
2019	Southwest Mississippi	0–9	0–6	7th (South)	
2020–21	Southwest Mississippi	0–6	0–6	7th (South)	
Southwest Mississippi:		1–23	0–6		
Total:		1–23			
