= 2005 Georgetown Hoyas football team =

American college football season

2005 Georgetown Hoyas football
- Conference: Patriot League
- Record: 4–7 (2–4 Patriot)
- Head coach: Bob Benson (13th season)
- Offensive coordinator: Elliot Uzelac (2nd season)
- Captains: Maurice Banks; Robert LaHayne; Michael Ononibaku; Kim Sarin
- Home stadium: Multi-Sport Field

2005 Patriot League football standings
	Conf.			Overall
Team	W		L	W		L
No. 21 Lafayette +^	5	–	1	8	–	4
No. 23 Colgate +^	5	–	1	8	–	4
Lehigh	4	–	2	8	–	3
Holy Cross	3	–	3	6	–	5
Georgetown	2	–	4	4	–	7
Fordham	2	–	4	2	–	9
Bucknell	0	–	6	1	–	10
+ – Conference co-champions; ^ – NCAA Division I-AA playoff participant; Rankings from The Sports Network poll

The 2005 Georgetown Hoyas football team was an American football team that represented Georgetown University during the 2005 NCAA Division I-AA football season. The Hoyas tied for second-to-last in the Patriot League.

In their 13th and final year under head coach Bob Benson, the Hoyas compiled a 4–7 record. Maurice Banks, Robert LaHayne, Michael Ononibaku and Kim Sarin were the team captains.

The Hoyas were outscored 292 to 116. Georgetown's 2–4 conference record tied for fifth place out of seven in the Patriot League standings.

Georgetown played its home games at Multi-Sport Field on the university campus in Washington, D.C.

== Schedule ==
Date	Time	Opponent	Site	Result	Attendance	Source
September 3		at Bucknell	Christy Mathewson–Memorial Stadium; Lewisburg, PA	W 19–16 ^{OT}	6,802	
September 10		at Holy Cross	Fitton Field; Worcester, MA	L 6–48	8,912	
September 17		Brown*	Multi-Sport Field; Washington, DC	L 3–34	3,500	
September 24	2:00 p.m.	at Stony Brook*	Kenneth P. LaValle Stadium; Stony Brook, NY	W 10–7	6,028	
October 1	1:00 p.m.	Lafayette	Multi-Sport Field; Washington, DC	L 7–12	2,143	
October 8		Duquesne*	Multi-Sport Field; Washington, DC	W 10–7 ^{OT}		
October 15	1:00 p.m.	at Cornell*	Schoellkopf Field; Ithaca, NY	L 7–57	11,432	
October 22		Fordham	Multi-Sport Field; Washington, DC	W 24–21	3,000	
November 5		at No. 13 Lehigh*	Goodman Stadium; Bethlehem, PA	L 14–46	13,071	
November 12	12:30 p.m.	Davidson*	Multi-Sport Field; Washington, DC	L 3–10	1,354	
November 19		Colgate	Multi-Sport Field; Washington, DC	L 7–34		
*Non-conference game; Rankings from The Sports Network Poll released prior to the game; All times are in Eastern time
