= 2006 Green Bay Packers season =

NFL team season

- General manager: Ted Thompson
- Head coach: Mike McCarthy
- Home stadium: Lambeau Field

Results
- Record: 8–8
- Division place: 2nd NFC North
- Playoffs: Did not qualify
- All-Pros: 1: DE Aaron Kampman (2nd team)
- Pro Bowlers: 2: WR Donald Driver; DE Aaron Kampman

Uniform

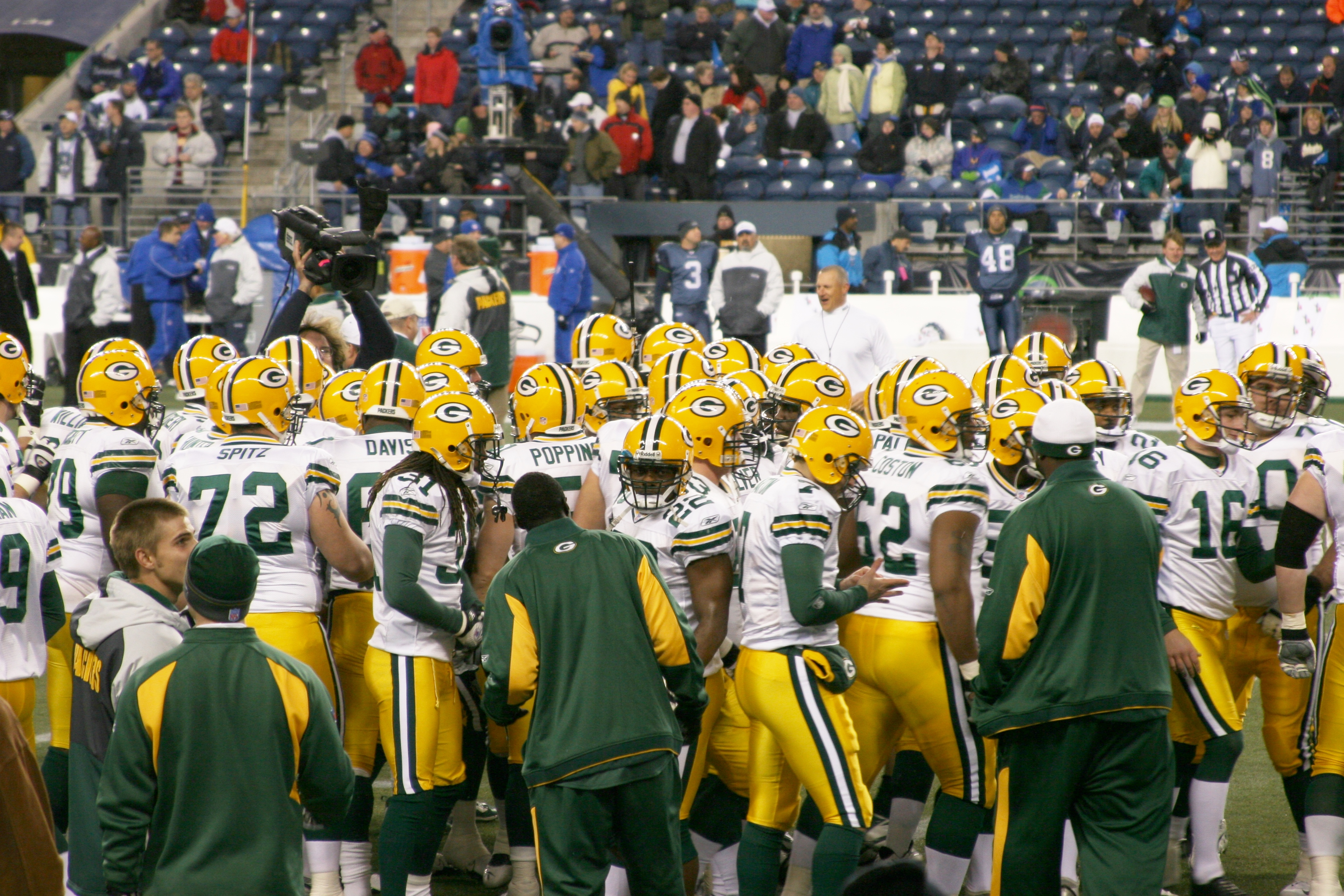
Packers players pregame at Seattle in week 12

The 2006 Green Bay Packers season was the franchise's 88th season overall and their 86th in the National Football League (NFL).

This season resulted in an 8–8 record. After the firing of Mike Sherman, the Packers hired Mike McCarthy as their head coach. 2006 would be McCarthy's first year as head coach. The Packers improved from 4–12 the previous year to a .500 win average in 2006. The Packers were effectively eliminated from playoff contention for the second straight year after the New York Giants gained the decisive tiebreaker over the Packers in the last week of the 2006 NFL season.

== Offseason ==
After some uncertainty, quarterback Brett Favre announced on April 26, 2006, that he would indeed return for the 2006 season. The Packers also acquired Oakland Raiders three-time Pro Bowl cornerback Charles Woodson through free agency later that day. He officially signed with the team on May 9.

The Packers drafted Ohio State linebacker A. J. Hawk with the fifth overall pick in the 2006 NFL draft on April 29, 2006. The Packers also traded star wide receiver (and potential holdout) Javon Walker to the Denver Broncos for a second round pick, which they then traded for multiple picks.

2006 Green Bay Packers draft
Round	Pick	Player	Position	College	Notes
1	5	A. J. Hawk *	LB	Ohio State	
2	47	Daryn Colledge	OT	Boise State	Pick from ATL
2	52	Greg Jennings *	WR	Western Michigan	Pick from NE
3	67	Abdul Hodge	LB	Iowa	
3	75	Jason Spitz	C	Louisville	Pick from NE
4	104	Cory Rodgers	WR	TCU	
4	115	Will Blackmon	CB	Boston College	Pick from PHI
5	148	Ingle Martin	QB	Furman	Pick from ATL
5	165	Tony Moll	OT	Nevada	Compensatory
6	183	Johnny Jolly	DT	Texas A&M	Pick from STL
6	185	Tyrone Culver	S	Fresno State	Pick from PHI
7	253	Dave Tollefson	DE	Northwest Missouri State	Compensatory
Made roster † Pro Football Hall of Fame * Made at least one Pro Bowl during career

=== Undrafted free agents ===
2006 undrafted free agents of note
Player	Position	College
Chris Francies	Wide Receiver	UTEP
A. J. Cooper	Tight End	North Dakota State
Jon Ryan	Punter	Regina
Tramon Williams	Cornerback	Louisiana Tech

The Packers picked up notable undrafted free agent Tramon Williams during the 2006 offseason, who later became the starting corner for the Super Bowl Champion 2010 Green Bay Packers. He was also selected but did not participate in the 2010 Pro Bowl.

=== Free agents ===
The Packers signed two notable free agents, CB Charles Woodson from the Oakland Raiders and DT Ryan Pickett from the St Louis Rams. Woodson would later be named the 2009 NFC Defensive Player of the Year and both players were integral parts of the 2010 Green Bay Packers Super Bowl Championship team.

== Personnel ==
=== Staff ===
2006 Green Bay Packers staff
Front office: Chairman of the board and chief executive officer – Bob Harlan; President and chief operating officer – John Jones; Executive vice president, general manager and director of football operations – Ted Thompson; Vice president of player finance/general counsel – Andrew Brandt; Director of college scouting – John Dorsey; Director of pro personnel – Reggie McKenzie; Personnel analyst to general manager – John Schneider; Assistant director of college scouting – Shaun Herock; Head coaches: Head coach – Mike McCarthy; Offensive coaches: Offensive coordinator – Jeff Jagodzinski; Quarterbacks – Tom Clements; Running backs – Edgar Bennett; Wide receivers – Jimmy Robinson; Tight ends – Ben McAdoo; Offensive line – Joe Philbin; Assistant offensive line – James Campen; Offensive quality control – Ty Knott	Defensive coaches: Defensive coordinator – Bob Sanders; Defensive tackles – Robert Nunn; Defensive ends – Carl Hairston; Linebackers – Winston Moss; Secondary – Kurt Schottenheimer; Defensive nickel package/cornerbacks – Lionel Washington; Defensive quality control – Eric Lewis; Special teams coaches: Special teams coordinator – Mike Stock; Assistant special teams – Shawn Slocum; Strength and conditioning: Strength and conditioning coordinator – Rock Gullickson; Assistant strength and conditioning – Mark Lovat; Strength and conditioning assistant – Brandon Johnson

=== Roster ===
2006 Green Bay Packers roster
Quarterbacks (QB): 8 Todd Bouman; 4 Brett Favre; 7 Ingle Martin; Running backs (RB): 30 Ahman Green; 33 William Henderson FB; 23 Noah Herron; 40 Brandon Miree FB; 34 Vernand Morency; 28 P. J. Pope; Wide receivers (WR): 80 Donald Driver; 83 Chris Francies; 18 Carlyle Holiday; 85 Greg Jennings; 82 Ruvell Martin; Tight ends (TE): 49 Zac Alcorn; 88 Bubba Franks; 86 Donald Lee; 87 David Martin	Offensive linemen (OL): 76 Chad Clifton OT; 73 Daryn Colledge G; 62 Junius Coston G; 75 Tony Moll OT; 64 Tony Palmer G; 72 Jason Spitz G; 65 Mark Tauscher OT; 70 Tyson Walter C; 63 Scott Wells C; Defensive linemen (DL): 90 Colin Cole DT; 94 Kabeer Gbaja-Biamila DE; 57 Jason Hunter DE; 77 Cullen Jenkins DT; 93 Johnny Jolly DT; 74 Aaron Kampman DE; 79 Ryan Pickett DT; 99 Corey Williams DT	Linebackers (LB): 56 Nick Barnett MLB; 50 A. J. Hawk OLB; 55 Abdul Hodge MLB; 51 Brady Poppinga OLB; 58 Ben Taylor OLB; 59 Tracy White OLB; Defensive backs (DB): 20 Atari Bigby SS; 24 Jarrett Bush CB; 28 Ahmad Carroll CB; 36 Nick Collins FS; 29 Tyrone Culver FS; 43 Patrick Dendy CB; 31 Al Harris CB; 22 Marquand Manuel SS; 26 Charlie Peprah SS; 21 Charles Woodson CB; Special teams (ST): 60 Rob Davis LS; 16 Dave Rayner K; 9 Jon Ryan P	Practice squad: 13 Carlton Brewster WR; 53 Spencer Havner OLB; -- Travis Leffew G; 47 Alvin Nnabuife S; -- Calvin Russell WR; 68 Adam Stenavich G; 69 Orrin Thompson OT; -- Dave Tollefson DE (IR); 38 Tramon Williams CB; Reserve: 97 Kenderick Allen DT (IR); 71 Kevin Barry OT (IR); 32 Arliss Beach RB (IR); 27 Will Blackmon CB (IR); 19 Shaun Bodiford WR (IR); 67 Josh Bourke OT (IR); 19 Vince Butler WR (IR); 52 Kurt Campbell OLB (IR); 89 Robert Ferguson WR (IR); 84 Tory Humphrey TE (IR); 96 Michael Montgomery DE (IR); 81 Koren Robinson WR (Susp.); 12 Aaron Rodgers QB (IR); 25 Marviel Underwood S (IR); Rookies in italics 53 active, 14 reserve, 8 practice squad

== Schedule ==
Week	Date	Opponent	Result	Game site	Record
1	September 10	Chicago Bears	L 0–26	Lambeau Field	0–1
2	September 17	New Orleans Saints	L 27–34	Lambeau Field	0–2
3	September 24	at Detroit Lions	W 31–24	Ford Field	1–2
4	October 2	at Philadelphia Eagles	L 9–31	Lincoln Financial Field	1–3
5	October 8	St. Louis Rams	L 20–23	Lambeau Field	1–4
6	Bye				
7	October 22	at Miami Dolphins	W 34–24	Dolphin Stadium	2–4
8	October 29	Arizona Cardinals	W 31–14	Lambeau Field	3–4
9	November 5	at Buffalo Bills	L 10–24	Ralph Wilson Stadium	3–5
10	November 12	at Minnesota Vikings	W 23–17	Hubert H. Humphrey Metrodome	4–5
11	November 19	New England Patriots	L 0–35	Lambeau Field	4–6
12	November 27	at Seattle Seahawks	L 24–34	Qwest Field	4–7
13	December 3	New York Jets	L 10–38	Lambeau Field	4–8
14	December 10	at San Francisco 49ers	W 30–19	Monster Park	5–8
15	December 17	Detroit Lions	W 17–9	Lambeau Field	6–8
16	December 21	Minnesota Vikings	W 9–7	Lambeau Field	7–8
17	December 31	at Chicago Bears	W 26–7	Soldier Field	8–8

== Standings ==
NFC North
	W	L	T	PCT	DIV	CONF	PF	PA	STK
^{(1)} Chicago Bears	13	3	0	.813	5–1	11–1	427	255	L1
Green Bay Packers	8	8	0	.500	5–1	7–5	301	366	W4
Minnesota Vikings	6	10	0	.375	2–4	6–6	282	387	L3
Detroit Lions	3	13	0	.188	0–6	2–10	305	398	W1

== Regular season ==
=== Week 1: vs. Chicago Bears ===
Quarter	1	2	3	4	Total
Bears	7	9	3	7	26
Packers	0	0	0	0	0

at Lambeau Field, Green Bay, Wisconsin

- Game time: 3:15 p.m. CDT
- Game weather: Cloudy; 62 °F (17 °C), Humidity 55 %, Wind: SE 12 mph
- Game attendance: 70,918
- Referee: Tony Corrente
- TV announcers (Fox): Sam Rosen, Tim Ryan, and Chris Myers

==== Game summary ====
The Packers opened the regular season on September 10 with a 26–0 loss to the Chicago Bears, the Packers' first scoreless game since October 17, 1991.

With the loss, the Packers began their season 0–1.

==== Scoring summary ====
Team	Qtr	Time	Play Description (Extra Point)	Drive Info	Score
Bears	1	12:05	B. Berrian 49 yd. TD pass from R. Grossman (R. Gould kick)	6 plays, 78 yards in 2:55	CHI 7–0
Bears	2	13:44	R. Gould 40 yd. Field Goal	9–62, 4:03	CHI 10–0
Bears	2	6:29	R.Gould 39 yd. Field Goal	10–36, 4:33	CHI 13–0
Bears	2	4:38	R.Gould 28 yd. Field Goal	4–6, 1:45	CHI 16–0
Bears	3	1:47	R.Gould 30 yd. Field Goal	10–54, 5:12	CHI 19–0
Bears	4	14:06	D.Hester 84 yd. punt return (R.Gould kick)	N/A	CHI 26–0

The day after the game the Packers acquired wide receiver Koren Robinson, who was released by the Minnesota Vikings after his second DUI in two years.

=== Week 2: vs. New Orleans Saints ===
Quarter	1	2	3	4	Total
Saints	0	14	6	14	34
Packers	13	0	0	14	27

at Lambeau Field, Green Bay, Wisconsin

- Game time: 12:02 pm CDT
- Game weather: Partly cloudy; 78 °F (26 °C), Humidity 59%, Wind: SW 12 mph
- Game attendance: 70,602
- Referee: Peter Morelli
- TV announcers (Fox): Ron Pitts and Terry Donahue

==== Game summary ====
The Packers hosted the New Orleans Saints on September 17, losing 34–27. The Packers jumped out to a 13–0 lead after forcing 3 Saints turnovers, but were not able to hold the lead in the second half. With the loss, the Packers fell to 0–2.

==== Scoring summary ====
Team	Qtr	Time	Play Description (Extra Point)	Drive Info	Score
Packers	1	11:06	G.Jennings 22 yd. pass from B.Favre (D.Rayner kick)	5 plays, 37 yards in 2:36	GB 7–0
Packers	1	8:38	D.Rayner 24 yd. Field Goal	4–9, 0:58	GB 10–0
Packers	1	0:50	D.Rayner 36 yd. Field Goal	8–75, 3:53	GB 13–0
Saints	2	7:44	D.McAllister 3 yd. run (J.Carney kick)	9–58, 3:25	GB 13–7
Saints	2	0:56	D.Henderson 26 yd. pass from D.Brees (J.Carney kick)	10–73, 3:31	NO 14-13
Saints	3	5:41	J.Carney 45 yd. Field Goal	5–53, 2:06	NO 17-13
Saints	3	3:02	J.Carney 47 yd. Field Goal	5–30, 1:22	NO 20-13
Packers	4	14:18	R.Ferguson 4 yd. pass from B.Favre (D.Rayner kick)	9–80, 3:44	Tied 20–20
Saints	4	8:20	M.Colston 35 yd. pass from D.Brees (J.Carney kick)	6–65, 2:27	NO 27-20
Saints	4	7:54	D.McAllister 23 yd. run (J.Carney kick)	1–23, 0:07	NO 34-20
Packers	4	4:18	N.Herron 6 yd. pass from B.Favre (D.Rayner kick)	10–68, 3:36	NO 34-27

=== Week 3 at Lions ===
Week Three: Green Bay Packers (0–2) at Detroit Lions (0–2)

Quarter	1	2	3	4	Total
Packers	14	3	7	7	31
Lions	14	0	7	3	24

at Ford Field • Detroit, Michigan

- Date: September 24
- Game time: 1:00 p.m. EDT
- Game weather: Indoors (dome)
- Game attendance: 61,095
- Referee: Walt Anderson
- TV announcers (Fox): Ron Pitts, Terry Donahue, and Jennifer Hammond
- Gamebook

Game information

Packers

- Brett Favre
  25/36, 340 Yds, 3 TD
- Ahman Green
  22 Rush, 63 Yds
- Greg Jennings
  3 Rec, 101 Yds, TD

Lions

- Jon Kitna
  25/40, 342 Yds, 2 TD, INT
- Kevin Jones
  17 Rush, 81 Yds, TD
- Roy Williams
  7 Rec, 138 Yds, TD

The Packers posted their first win for the season while playing the Detroit Lions in Detroit, 31–24. Brett Favre completed his 400th career touchdown pass on a 75-yard play to rookie Greg Jennings, becoming only the second person (in addition to Dan Marino) to reach 400. With the win the Packers improved to 1–2 while the Lions fell to 0–3. Favre was named NFC Offensive Player of the Week.

Scoring summary

Quarter	Time	Drive			Team	Scoring information	Score	
Quarter	Time	Plays	Yards	TOP	Team	Scoring information	GB	DET
1	7:03	3	80	1:37	Packers	Greg Jennings 75-yard touchdown reception from Brett Favre, Dave Rayner kick good	7	0
1	3:51	6	79	3:12	Lions	Shawn Bryson 37-yard touchdown reception from Jon Kitna, Jason Hanson kick good	7	7
1	2:05				Packers	Interception returned 29 yards for touchdown by Marquand Manuel, Dave Rayner kick good	14	7
1	0:00	4	76	2:05	Lions	Roy Williams 42-yard touchdown reception from Jon Kitna, Jason Hanson kick good	14	14
2	7:51	13	69	7:09	Packers	24-yard field goal by Dave Rayner	17	14
3	6:44	10	80	4:51	Packers	Donald Driver 5-yard touchdown reception from Brett Favre, Dave Rayner kick good	24	14
3	3:24	7	58	3:20	Lions	Kevin Jones 5-yard touchdown run, Jason Hanson kick good	24	21
4	12:19	4	43	1:48	Packers	Ahman Green 10-yard touchdown reception from Brett Favre, Dave Rayner kick good	31	21
4	5:24	7	58	2:45	Lions	40-yard field goal by Jason Hanson	31	24
"TOP" = time of possession. For other American football terms, see Glossary of American football.							31	24

=== Week 4: at Philadelphia Eagles ===
Quarter	1	2	3	4	Total
Packers	3	6	0	0	9
Eagles	0	7	17	7	31

at Lincoln Financial Field, Philadelphia, Pennsylvania

- Game time: 8:40 pm EDT/7:30 pm CDT
- Game weather: Clear; 59 °F (15 °C), Humidity 72%, Wind: WSW 2 mph
- Game attendance: 69,222
- Referee: Scott Green
- TV announcers (ESPN): Mike Tirico, Joe Theismann, Tony Kornheiser, Michele Tafoya and Suzy Kolber

==== Game summary ====
The Packers went to Philadelphia to play the Eagles on Monday Night Football. The Packers started running back Vernand Morency as Ahman Green was inactive due to injury. The Packers held the lead at half time, but the Eagles scored 24 unanswered points in the second half to earn the victory. As a result of Ahmad Carroll's performance in week 4, as well as previous weeks, the Packers released him from the team. With the loss, the Packers fell to 1–3.

==== Scoring summary ====
Team	Qtr	Time	Play Description (Extra Point)	Drive Info	Score
Packers	1	10:07	D.Rayner 23 yd. Field Goal	8 plays, 48 yards in 1:50	GB 3–0
Eagles	2	9:43	D.McNabb 6 yd. run (D.Akers kick)	2–6, 0:08	PHI 7–3
Packers	2	5:32	D.Rayner 54 yd. Field Goal	8–35, 4:11	PHI 7–6
Packers	2	1:45	D.Rayner 46 yd. Field Goal	9–42, 2:38	GB 9–7
Eagles	3	8:21	D.Akers 40 yd. Field Goal	15–57, 6:39	PHI 10–9
Eagles	3	5:08	G.Lewis 45 yd. pass from D.McNabb (D.Akers kick)	2–56, 0:47	PHI 17–9
Eagles	3	3:51	G.Lewis 30 yd. pass from D.McNabb (D.Akers kick)	1–44, 0:17	PHI 24–9
Eagles	4	12:41	D.McNabb 15 yd. run (D.Akers kick)	6–66, 3:00	PHI 31–9

=== Week 5: vs. St. Louis Rams ===
Quarter	1	2	3	4	Total
Rams	7	7	3	6	23
Packers	7	6	0	7	20

at Lambeau Field, Green Bay, Wisconsin

- Game time: 12:02 pm CDT
- Game weather: Sunny; 69 °F (21 °C), Humidity 45%, Wind: SW 22 mph
- Game attendance: 70,804
- Referee: Ron Winter
- TV announcers (Fox): Kenny Albert, Brian Baldinger, and Jay Glazer.

==== Game summary ====
Noah Herron rushed for a career best 106 yards against the St. Louis Rams, but quarterback Marc Bulger of the Rams threw for two touchdowns to help his team to victory. The Packers had a chance to tie the score with a field goal or take the lead with a touchdown in their final possession, but were unable to do so as quarterback Brett Favre was sacked and fumbled at the St. Louis 18 yard line. The Rams were able to recover the ball.

With the loss, the Packers went into their bye week at 1–4.

==== Scoring summary ====
Team	Qtr	Time	Play Description (Extra Point)	Drive Info	Score
Rams	1	9:49	T.Holt 6 yd. pass from M.Bulger (J.Wilkins kick)	6 plays, 37 yards in 3:01	STL 7–0
Packers	1	1:38	N.Herron 1 yd. run (D.Rayner kick)	15–80, 8:11	Tied 7–7
Packers	2	13:12	D.Rayner 27 yd. Field Goal	5–49, 1:48	GB 10–7
Rams	2	3:27	K.Curtis 3 yd. pass from M.Bulger (J.Wilkins kick)	9–64, 5:01	STL 14–10
Packers	2	0:00	D.Rayner 32 yd. Field Goal	10–46, 3:27	STL 14–13
Rams	3	3:04	J.Wilkins 31 yd. Field Goal	8–32, 3:34	STL 17–13
Rams	4	14:53	J.Wilkins 26 yd. Field Goal	7–41, 2:13	STL 20–13
Rams	4	9:25	J.Wilkins 20 yd. Field Goal	9–78, 4:25	STL 23–13
Packers	4	6:42	G.Jennings 46 yd. pass from B.Favre (D.Rayner kick)	5–64, 2:43	STL 23–20

=== Week 7: at Miami Dolphins ===
Quarter	1	2	3	4	Total
Packers	0	6	14	14	34
Dolphins	7	3	3	11	24

at Dolphin Stadium, Miami Gardens, Florida

- Game time: 1:02 pm EDT
- Game weather: Partly cloudy; 86 °F (30 °C), Humidity 59%, Wind: E 9 mph
- Game attendance: 73,548
- Referee: Gene Steratore
- TV announcers (Fox): Matt Vasgersian and J.C. Pearson

==== Game summary ====
Coming off their bye week, Green Bay defeated the Miami Dolphins on the road as the Packers defense intercepted quarterback Joey Harrington three times, with Charles Woodson returning one for a touchdown. Ahman Green carried the ball 18 times for 118 yards, including a 70-yard touchdown run. Brett Favre completed 19 of 35 passes, recording 206 yards and 2 touchdown passes. This was the first victory for the Packers in Miami since winning Super Bowl II in 1968 as the team improved to 2–4.

==== Scoring summary ====
Team	Qtr	Time	Play Description (Extra Point)	Drive Info	Score
Dolphins	1	7:51	M.Booker 8 yd. pass from J.Harrington (O.Mare kick)	1 play, 8 yards in 0:05	MIA 7–0
Packers	2	12:08	D.Rayner 42 yd. Field Goal	9–30, 3:44	MIA 7–3
Packers	2	9:50	D.Rayner 34 yd. Field Goal	6–14, 1:32	MIA 7–6
Dolphins	2	1:03	O.Mare 32 yd. Field Goal	10–70, 4:29	MIA 10–6
Packers	3	14:10	C.Woodson 23 yd. interception return (D.Rayner kick)	N/A	GB 13–10
Packers	3	8:51	D.Driver 34 yd. pass from B.Favre (D.Rayner kick)	6–64, 2:46	GB 20–10
Dolphins	3	6:30	O.Mare 40 yd. Field Goal	7–39, 2:21	GB 20–13
Dolphins	4	13:28	O.Mare 45 yd. Field Goal	9–41, 4:01	GB 20–16
Packers	4	13:14	A.Green 70 yd. run (D.Rayner kick)	1–70, 0:14	GB 27–13
Dolphins	4	11:56	D.Hagan 13 yd. pass from J.Harrington (J.Harrington-M.Booker pass)	5–80, 1:18	GB 27–21
Packers	4	6:11	D.Martin 13 yd. pass from B.Favre (D.Rayner kick)	11–80, 5:45	GB 34–21

=== Week 8: vs. Arizona Cardinals ===
Quarter	1	2	3	4	Total
Cardinals	0	7	7	0	14
Packers	7	14	7	3	31

at Lambeau Field, Green Bay, Wisconsin

- Game time: 12:02 pm CST
- Game weather: Sunny; 45 °F (7 °C), Humidity 45%, Wind: W 10 mph
- Game attendance: 70,809
- Referee: Bill Leavy
- TV announcers (Fox): Ron Pitts and Terry Donahue

==== Game summary ====
The Green Bay Packers won over the visiting Arizona Cardinals at home as running backs Ahman Green and Vernand Morency each rushed for over 100 yards, becoming the first Packers running back duo to accomplish that feat since the 1980s. Brett Favre threw for 180 yards and one touchdown, as well as one rushing touchdown which he celebrated with his first and only Lambeau Leap. Leading Green Bay's receiving corps was Donald Driver, who had five receptions for 58 Yards. Coming up behind him was David Martin, who had four receptions for 48 Yards and one touchdown. On defense, the Packers limited Cardinals rookie quarterback Matt Leinart to 14/35 for 157 yards with one touchdown and one interception. They also held Cardinals running back Edgerrin James to 84 rushing yards on 24 carries, along with three receptions for 25 receiving yards. Aaron Kampman was named NFC Defensive Player of the Week for his performance.

With the win, the Packers improved to 3–4.

==== Scoring summary ====
Team	Qtr	Time	Play Description (Extra Point)	Drive Info	Score
Packers	1	5:05	D.Martin 1 yd. pass from B.Favre (D.Rayner kick)	9 plays, 88 yards in 4:37	GB 7–0
Packers	2	14:22	A.Green 4 yd. run (D.Rayner kick)	9–70, 3:19	GB 14–0
Packers	2	6:24	A.Green 2 yd. run (D.Rayner kick)	9–87, 3:25	GB 21–0
Cardinals	2	0:29	E.James 1 yd. run (N.Rackers kick)	14–84, 5:55	GB 21–7
Packers	3	7:41	B.Favre 1 yd. run (D.Rayner kick)	13–74, 7:19	GB 28–7
Cardinals	3	1:33	T.Walters 17 yd. pass from M.Leinart (N.Rackers kick)	13–59, 6:08	GB 28–14
Packers	4	6:56	D.Rayner 42 yd. Field Goal	10–47, 6:18	GB 31–14

=== Week 9: at Buffalo Bills ===
Quarter	1	2	3	4	Total
Packers	0	0	7	3	10
Bills	3	7	0	14	24

at Ralph Wilson Stadium, Buffalo, New York

- Game time: 1:02 pm EST
- Game weather: Mostly cloudy; 47 °F (8 °C), Humidity 53%, Wind: S 10 mph
- Game attendance: 72,205
- Referee: Walt Coleman
- TV announcers (Fox): Ron Pitts and Terry Donahue

==== Game summary ====
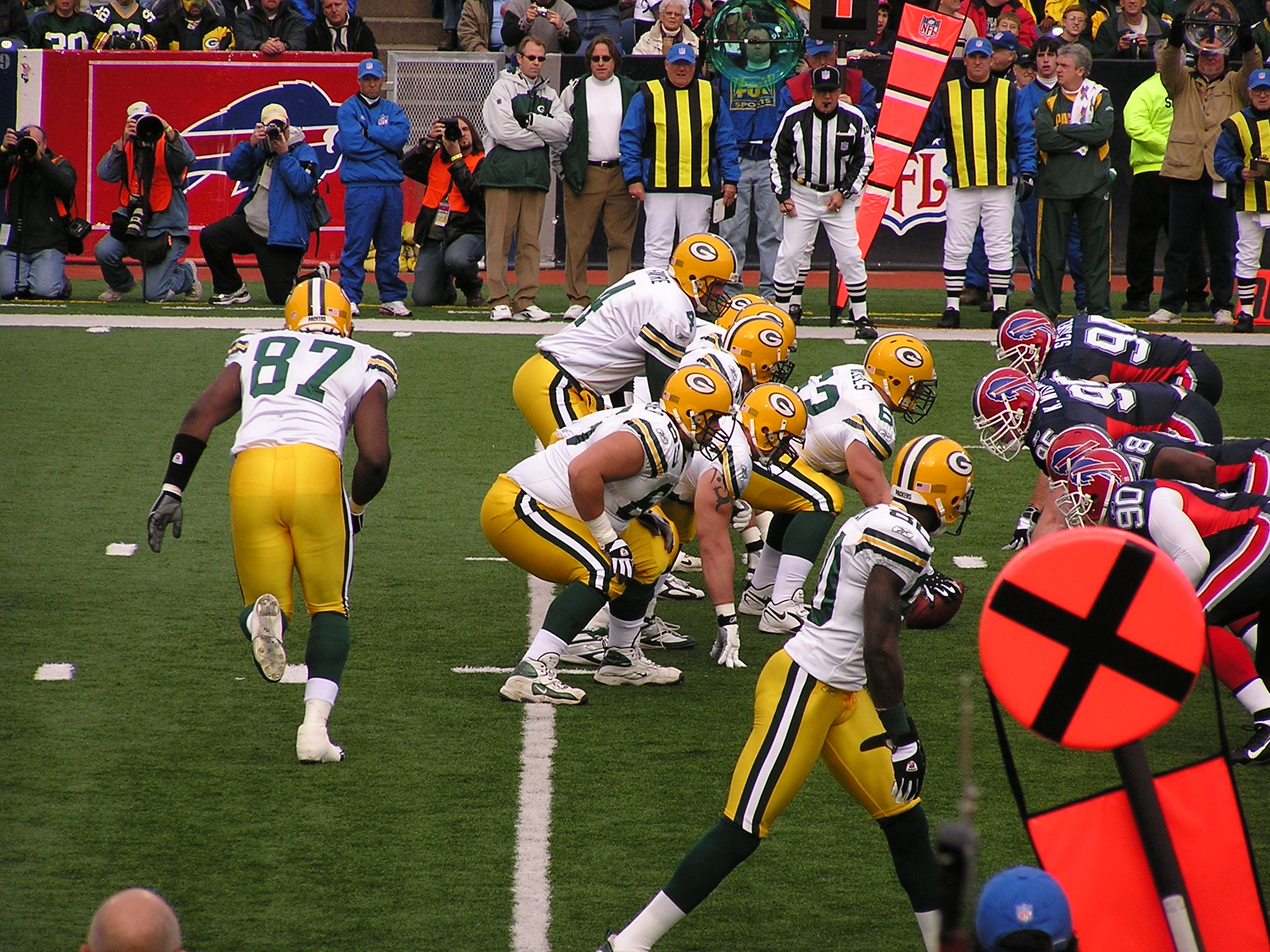
Favre under center at Ralph Wilson Stadium.

The Green Bay Packers traveled on the road to face the Buffalo Bills. The Bills were able to lead the Packers at half time with a 10–0 lead, capitalizing on an interception return for a touchdown by London Fletcher. In the second half, the Packers tied the score with a touchdown pass to Donald Driver. The Bills were able to score in the fourth quarter with 43 yard touchdown pass to receiver Lee Evans. The Packers drove the ball deep to the one-yard line, but on first down the ball is intercepted and returned deep in Packer territory. The Bills were able to score three plays later to increase the lead by 14 and earn a victory.

With the loss, the Packers fell to 3–5.

==== Scoring summary ====
Team	Qtr	Time	Play Description (Extra Point)	Drive Info	Score
Bills	1	11:00	R.Lindell 28 yd. Field Goal	7 plays, 19 yards in 4:00	BUF 3–0
Bills	2	14:10	L.Fletcher-Baker 17 yd. interception return (R.Lindell kick)	N/A	BUF 10–0
Packers	3	4:17	D.Driver 1 yd. pass from B.Favre (D.Rayner kick)	10–65, 5:01	Tied 10–10
Packers	4	12:41	D.Rayner 49 yd. Field Goal	6–24, 2:01	GB 13–10
Bills	4	8:00	L.Evans 43 yd. pass from J.Losman (R.Lindell kick)	2–33, 0:28	BUF 17–13
Bills	4	3:01	A.Thomas 14 yd. run (R.Lindell kick)	3–27, 1:32	BUF 24–13

=== Week 10: at Minnesota Vikings ===
Quarter	1	2	3	4	Total
Packers	10	7	3	3	23
Vikings	0	14	0	3	17

at the Metrodome, Minneapolis, Minnesota

- Game time: 12:05 pm CST
- Game weather: Controlled climate; 66 °F (19 °C)
- Game attendance: 63,924
- Referee: Terry McAulay
- TV announcers (Fox): Kenny Albert, Brian Baldinger, and Jay Glazer

==== Game summary ====
In week 10, Green Bay traveled to the Metrodome to face the Minnesota Vikings. The winner of the game would take second place in the NFC North. The Packers were able to score early in the first quarter with a field goal by Dave Rayner. Shortly after, Packer linebacker Brady Poppinga sacked Vikings quarterback Brad Johnson causing him to fumble; the Packers recovered the ball. The fumble set up a Brett Favre touchdown pass to Noah Herron. The Vikings were able to take the lead with two touchdowns, one a 40-yard touchdown pass to Billy McMullen. With under two minutes remaining in the half, the Packers regained the lead when Brett Favre threw an 82-yard touchdown pass to wide receiver Donald Driver. The Packers would hold the lead for the rest of the game.

With the win, the Packers improved to 4–5.

Brett Favre finished the game with 347 yards, two touchdowns, and no interceptions. Receiver Donald Driver had six catches for 191 yards. Vikings quarterback Brad Johnson threw for 257 yards, one touchdown, and one interception. Packer kicker Dave Rayner made three field goals in three attempts. A. J. Hawk was named NFL Rookie of the Week for his performance. He recorded 13 tackles, one forced fumble, and 1.5 sacks.

==== Scoring summary ====
Team	Qtr	Time	Play Description (Extra Point)	Drive Info	Score
Packers	1	6:40	D.Rayner 20 yd. Field Goal	13 plays, 83 yards in 6:54	GB 3–0
Packers	1	3:34	N.Herron 5 yd. pass from B.Favre (D.Rayner kick)	7–22, 2:55	GB 10–0
Vikings	2	14:52	B.McMullen 40 yd. pass from B.Johnson (R.Longwell kick)	8–72, 3:42	GB 10–7
Vikings	2	7:52	B.McMullen fumble recovery in end zone (R.Longwell kick)	9–82, 5:20	MIN 14–10
Packers	2	0:48	D.Driver 82 yd. pass from B.Favre (D.Rayner kick)	3–97, 1:02	GB 17–14
Packers	3	4:38	D.Rayner 24 yd. Field Goal	7–51, 2:33	GB 20–14
Packers	4	2:11	D.Rayner 29 yd. Field Goal	10–66, 5:35	GB 23–14
Vikings	4	0:58	R.Longwell 34 yd. Field Goal	9–57, 1:13	GB 23–17

=== Week 11: vs. New England Patriots ===
Quarter	1	2	3	4	Total
Patriots	7	14	7	7	35
Packers	0	0	0	0	0

at Lambeau Field, Green Bay, Wisconsin

- Game time: 12:02 pm CST
- Game weather: Mostly sunny; 41 °F (5 °C), Humidity 46%, Wind: NW 12 mph
- Game attendance: 70,753
- Referee: Mike Carey
- TV announcers (CBS): Greg Gumbel and Dan Dierdorf

==== Game summary ====
After a two-game road stretch, the Packers came back to Lambeau Field to face the New England Patriots. The Patriots handed Green Bay their second shutout of the season. Patriots quarterback Tom Brady threw for 244 yards and 4 touchdowns. In the second quarter, Green Bay quarterback Brett Favre was injured on a sack. He left the game and did not return. Backup quarterback Aaron Rodgers replaced Favre and completed only four out of twelve passes for 32 yards with one fumble. Rodgers suffered a broken foot in the loss and was placed on injured reserve, thus ending his season. The Packers only recorded 120 total yards of offense and five total first downs. On the other side, the Patriots recorded 360 yards of total offense with 22 first downs.

With the loss, the Packers' record dropped to 4–6. The loss marked the first time the Packers were shut out at Lambeau Field twice in a season.

==== Scoring summary ====
Team	Qtr	Time	Play Description (Extra Point)	Drive Info	Score
Patriots	1	10:47	D.Graham 2 yd. pass from T.Brady (S.Gostkowski kick)	7 plays, 63 yards in 3:13	NE 7–0
Patriots	2	10:54	C.Dillon 1 yd. run (S.Gostkowski kick)	12–66, 6:34	NE 14–0
Patriots	2	2:22	R.Caldwell 54 yd. pass from T.Brady (S.Gostkowski kick)	4–71, 2:19	NE 21–0
Patriots	3	0:43	B.Watson 8 yd. pass from T.Brady (S.Gostkowski kick)	6–60, 3:25	NE 28–0
Patriots	4	8:49	L.Maroney 19 yd. pass from T.Brady (S.Gostkowski kick)	3–23, 1:32	NE 35–0

=== Week 12: at Seattle Seahawks ===
Quarter	1	2	3	4	Total
Packers	7	7	7	3	24
Seahawks	3	9	7	15	34

at Qwest Field, Seattle, Washington

- Game time: 5:41 pm PST
- Game weather: Snow; 34 °F (1 °C), Humidity 72%, Wind: SSW 7 mph
- Game attendance: 68,256
- Referee: Tony Corrente
- TV announcers (ESPN): Mike Tirico, Joe Theismann, Tony Kornheiser, Michele Tafoya, and Suzy Kolber

==== Game summary ====
In week 12, the Packers traveled to Qwest Field to play the Seattle Seahawks. It was the Packers' second Monday Night Football game of the season. Green Bay held the lead at the end of the first half, with a touchdown run from Ahman Green and a fumble return for a touchdown by Abdul Hodge, who recorded his first NFL start. Seattle kicker, Josh Brown kicked four field goals in the first half. In the second half, the Packers were able to increase the lead to nine points as quarterback Brett Favre threw a 48-yard touchdown pass to Donald Driver. Seattle would decrease the Packers lead to two points when quarterback Matt Hasselbeck threw a 23-yard touchdown pass to receiver D.J. Hackett. The Seahawks would take the lead in the fourth quarter with another touchdown pass from Matt Hasselbeck. Packers kicker Dave Rayner kicked a 34-yard field goal to decrease the Seahawks lead to three points, but on the next possession, Hasselbeck completed his third touchdown pass to Jerramy Stevens. The Packers were unable to score in the closing minutes of the game as Brett Favre is intercepted twice.

Seattle Seahawks running back, Shaun Alexander rushed 40 times for 201 yards, averaging about five yards per carry. Matt Hasselbeck completed 17 of 36 passes for 157 yards and three touchdowns. He was also intercepted three times, two of them by cornerback Charles Woodson. Brett Favre completed 22 passes in 36 attempts for 266 yards. He recorded a touchdown and three interceptions.

With the loss, the Packers fell to 4–7.

==== Scoring summary ====
Team	Qtr	Time	Play Description (Extra Point)	Drive Info	Score
Packers	1	12:42	A.Green 5 yd. run (D.Rayner kick)	4 plays, 36 yards in 1:30	GB 7–0
Seahawks	1	3:35	J.Brown 45 yd. Field Goal	11–45, 5:04	GB 7–3
Seahawks	2	8:36	J.Brown 41 yd. Field Goal	9–57, 3:55	GB 7–6
Seahawks	2	3:34	J.Brown 37 yd. Field Goal	9–25, 3:21	SEA 9–7
Packers	2	1:51	A.Hodge 29 yd. fumble return (D.Rayner kick)	N/A	GB 14–9
Seahawks	2	0:23	J.Brown 28 yd. Field Goal	8–40, 1:28	GB 14–12
Packers	3	12:39	D.Driver 48 yd. pass from B.Favre (D.Rayner kick)	5–72, 2:21	GB 21–12
Seahawks	3	6:19	D.Hackett 23 yd. pass from M.Hasselbeck (J.Brown kick)	9–62, 3:33	GB 21–19
Seahawks	4	14:11	D.Jackson 4 yd. pass from M.Hasselbeck (M.Hasselbeck-J.Stevens pass)	10–77, 5:26	SEA 27–21
Packers	4	10:50	D.Rayner 34 yd. Field Goal	7–43, 3:21	SEA 27–24
Seahawks	4	6:13	J.Stevens 3 yd. pass from M.Hasselbeck (J.Brown kick)	11–51, 4:37	SEA 34–24

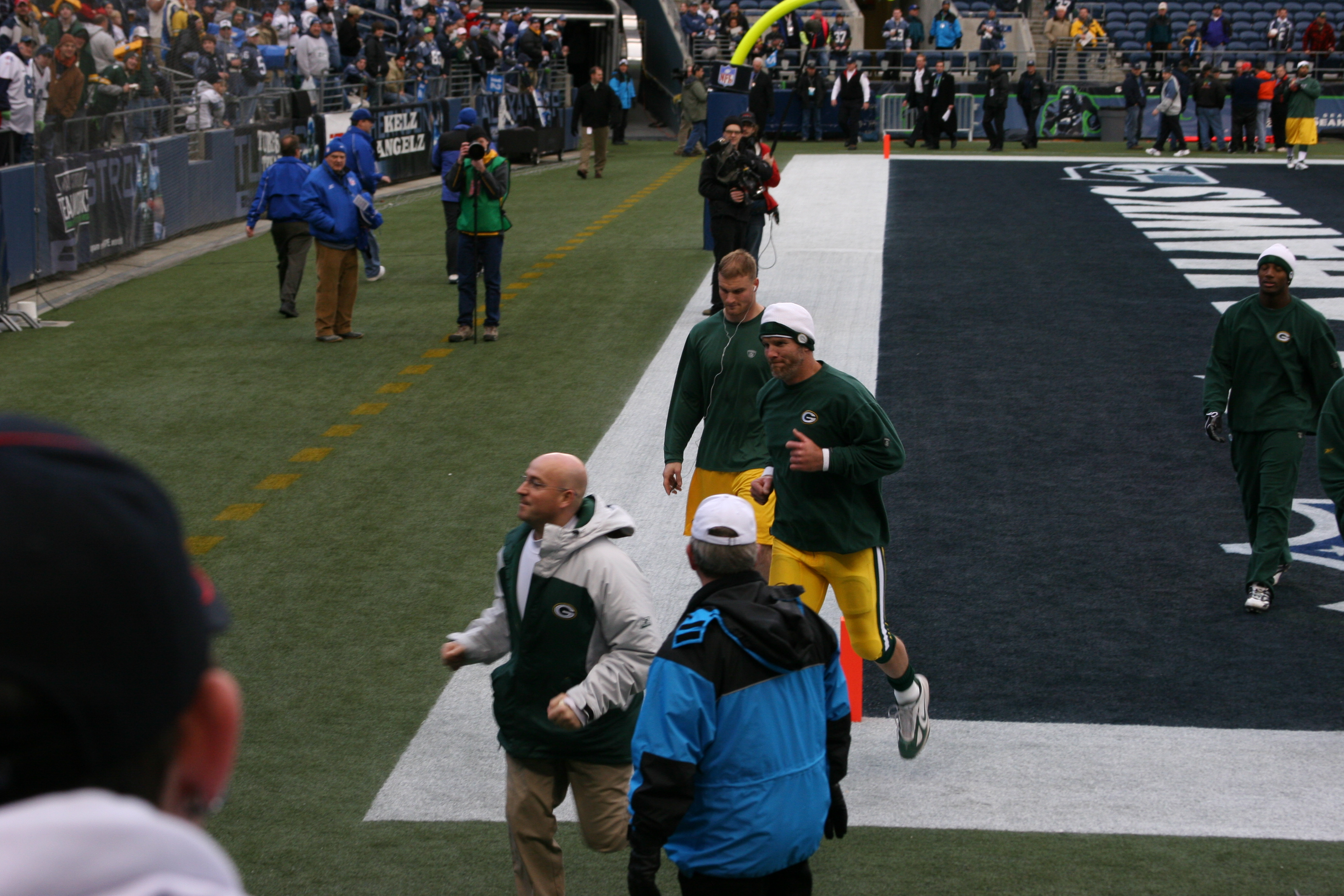
Brett Favre before the Seattle game

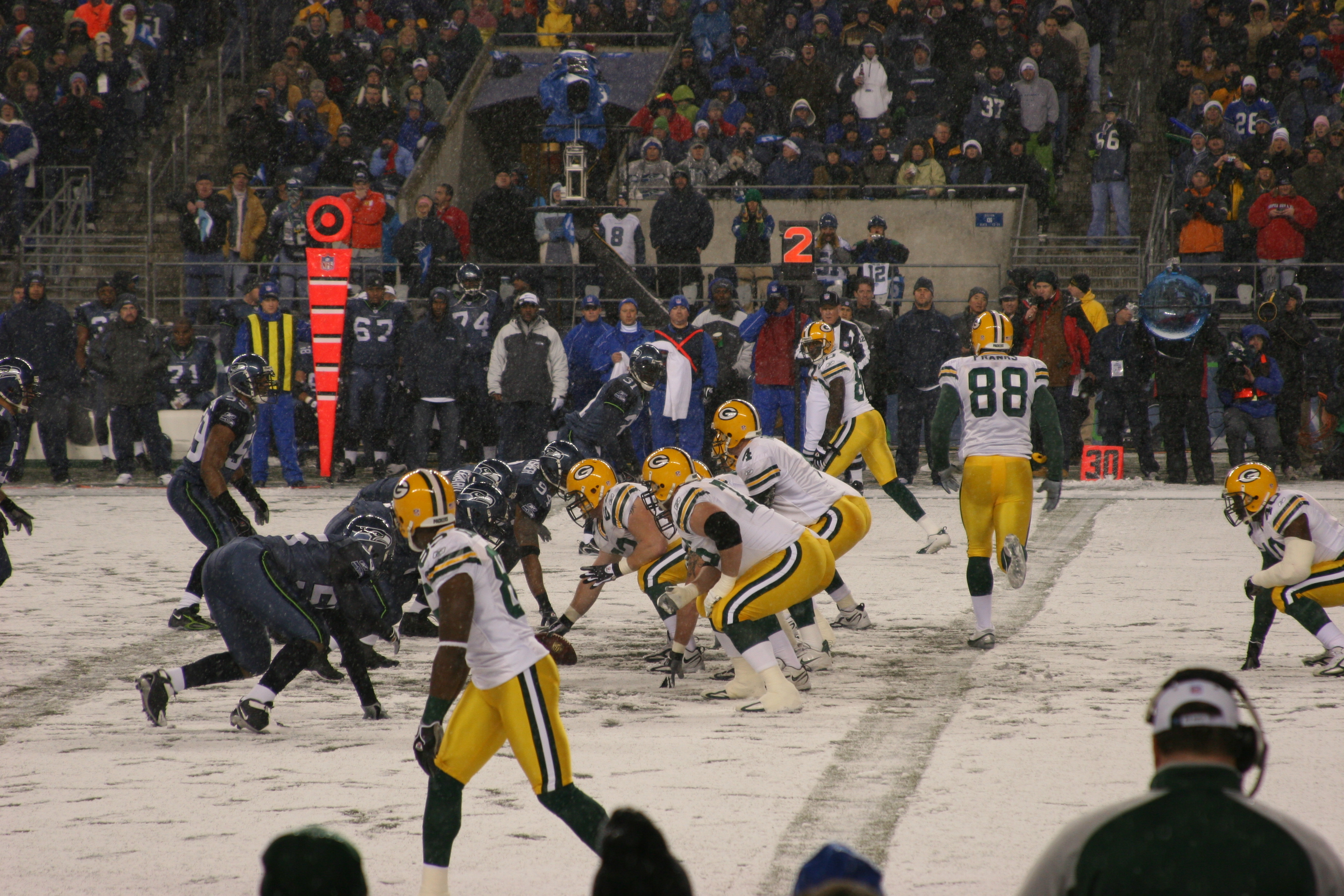
Favre under center at a rare snow-covered Qwest Field

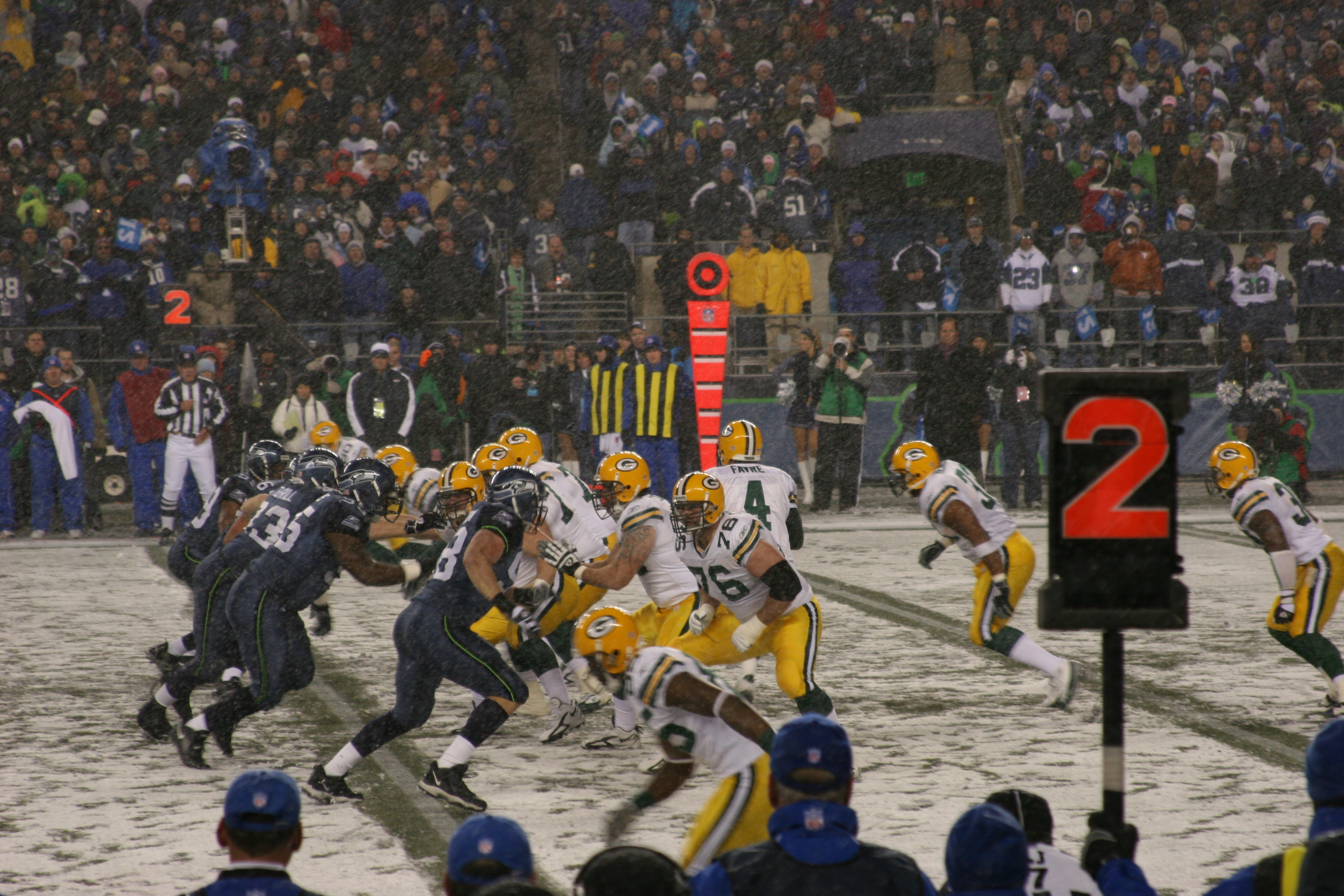
Packers on offense

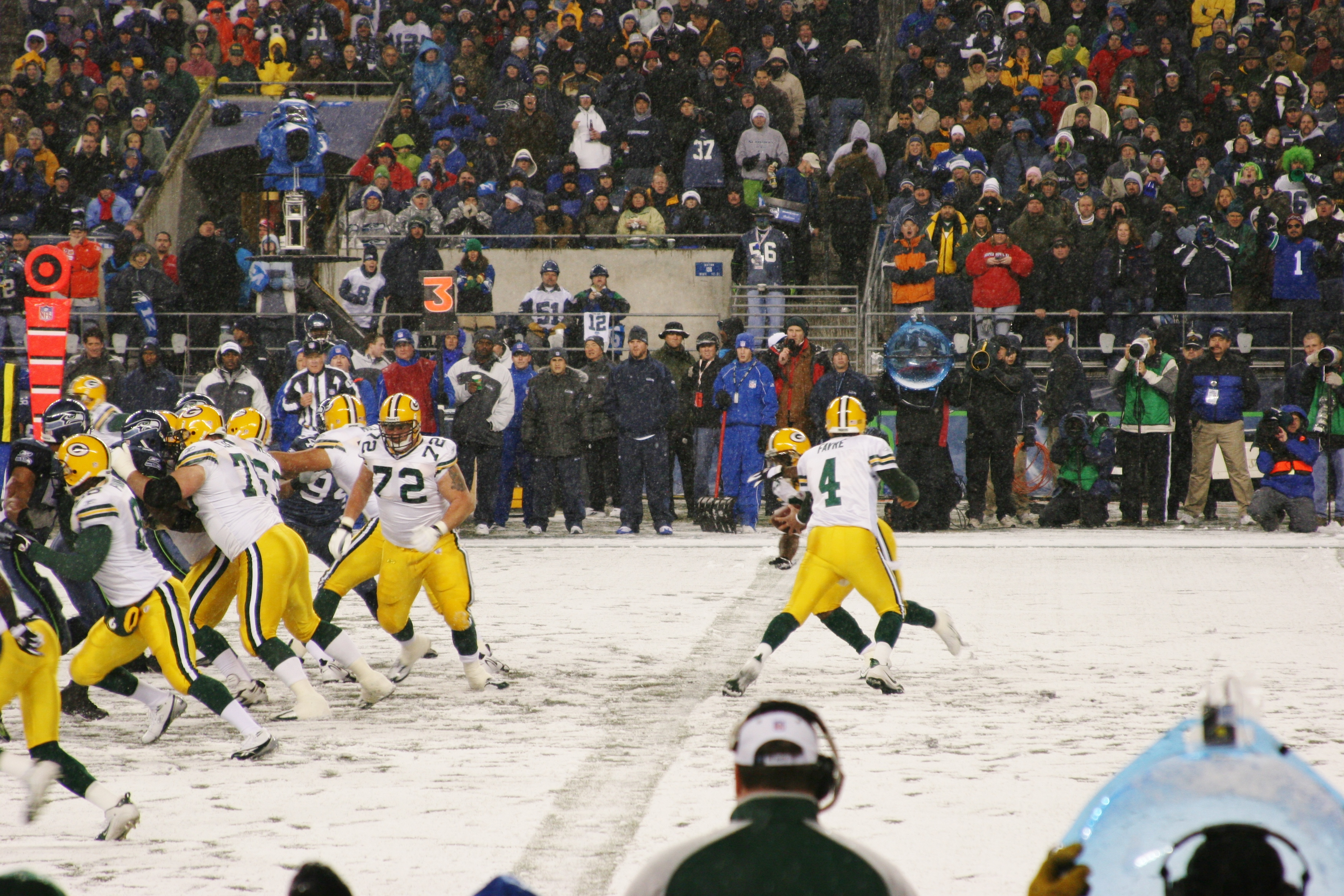
Favre hands off the ball to a running back

=== Week 13: vs. New York Jets ===
Quarter	1	2	3	4	Total
Jets	10	21	0	7	38
Packers	0	0	10	0	10

at Lambeau Field, Green Bay, Wisconsin

- Game time: 12:02 pm CST
- Game weather: Snow Flurries; 19 °F (−7 °C), Humidity 62%, Wind: 18 mph; Wind Chill: 2 °F (−17 °C)
- Game attendance: 70,527
- Referee: Larry Nemmers
- TV announcers (CBS): Jim Nantz and Phil Simms

==== Game summary ====
The Packers traveled back home for a Week 13 inter-conference fight with the New York Jets. In the first quarter, Green Bay trailed early as Jets kicker Mike Nugent kicked a 24-yard field goal, while quarterback Chad Pennington completed a 12-yard touchdown pass to receiver Jerricho Cotchery. In the second quarter, the Jets were able to increase their lead even further with Jets running back Cedric Houston scoring from a 3-yard and a 1-yard TD run, while Pennington completed a 1-yard touchdown pass to tight end Chris Baker. In the third quarter, the Packers scored their first points of the game when Dave Rayner kicked a 34-yard field goal. Later in the third quarter Brett Favre completed a 20-yard touchdown pass to wide receiver Donald Driver. However, in the fourth quarter, the Jets wrapped up the game with running back Leon Washington's 20-yard touchdown run. With their third-straight loss, Green Bay fell to 4–8.

==== Scoring summary ====
Team	Qtr	Time	Play Description (Extra Point)	Drive Info	Score
Jets	1	9:55	M.Nugent 24 yd. Field Goal	11 plays, 63 yards in 5:05	NYJ 3–0
Jets	1	4:45	J.Cotchery 12 yd. pass from C.Pennington (M.Nugent kick)	7–51, 2:23	NYJ 10–0
Jets	2	12:40	C.Houston 3 yd. run (M.Nugent kick)	9–83, 5:27	NYJ 17–0
Jets	2	6:17	C.Houston 1 yd. run (M.Nugent kick)	8–70, 3:50	NYJ 24–0
Jets	2	0:09	C.Baker 1 yd. pass from C.Pennington (M.Nugent kick)	13–77, 4:51	NYJ 31–0
Packers	3	8:32	D.Rayner 34 yd. Field Goal	14–50, 6:28	NYJ 31–3
Packers	3	1:16	D.Driver 20 yd. pass from B.Favre (D.Rayner kick)	4–37, 1:23	NYJ 31–10
Jets	4	11:30	L.Washington 20 yd. run (M.Nugent kick)	7–81, 3:38	NYJ 38–10

=== Week 14: at San Francisco 49ers ===
Quarter	1	2	3	4	Total
Packers	7	10	7	6	30
49ers	3	3	7	6	19

at Monster Park, San Francisco

- Game time: 1:06 pm PST
- Game weather: Partly cloudy after morning rain; 58 °F (14 °C), Humidity 70%, Wind: W 15 mph
- Game attendance: 68,539
- Referee: Bill Leavy
- TV announcers (Fox): Matt Vasgersian, J.C. Pearson, Tim Ryan, and Laura Okmin

==== Game summary ====
With three straight losses, the Packers traveled to Monster Park to play the San Francisco 49ers. The 49ers were the first team to score, with a field goal from kicker Joe Nedney. The Packers answered on their next possession as QB Brett Favre completed a 36-yard touchdown pass to rookie receiver Ruvell Martin, his first career touchdown. At the start of the second quarter, Packers kicker Dave Rayner increased the Packers lead to ten points with a 23-yard field goal. The Packers drove the football eighty yards on their next possession. The drive ended in a one-yard touchdown run by RB Ahman Green. Joe Nedney kicked a 36-yard field goal at the end of the first half. On the first drive of the second half, the 49ers completed a 79-yard drive with a one-yard touchdown run by running back Frank Gore. Later in the third quarter, Brett Favre completed a 68-yard touchdown pass to WR Donald Driver. In the fourth quarter, Dave Rayner kicked two field goals for the Packers. The 49ers scored their second touchdown of the day on a 52-yard touchdown pass to tight end Vernon Davis from quarterback Alex Smith.

Brett Favre completed 22 of 34 passes with 293 yards and two touchdowns. Nine of Favre's completions came to receiver Donald Driver, who recorded 160 yards receiving and one touchdown. 49ers quarterback Alex Smith completed 12 of 29 passes with 201 and one touchdown. He also threw two interceptions, one to safety Nick Collins and the other to rookie linebacker A. J. Hawk, his first career interception. 49ers running back Frank Gore recorded 130 yards rushing with one touchdown and 38 yards receiving. The win snapped the Packers three-game losing streak, moving them to 5–8. This win exceeded the Packers win total from last year when they recorded four wins.

==== Scoring summary ====
Team	Qtr	Time	Play Description (Extra Point)	Drive Info	Score
49ers	1	8:03	J.Nedney 24 yd. Field Goal	6 plays, 74 yards in 2:22	SF 3–0
Packers	1	5:55	R.Martin 36 yd. pass from B.Favre (D.Rayner kick)	4–63, 2:08	GB 7–3
Packers	2	14:49	D.Rayner 23 yd. Field Goal	GB 10–3	4–3, 0:40
Packers	2	6:45	A.Green 1 yd. run (D.Rayner kick)	13–80, 6:10	GB 17–3
49ers	2	1:01	J.Nedney 36 yd. Field Goal	13–50, 5:44	GB 17–6
49ers	3	8:50	F.Gore 1 yd. run (J.Nedney kick)	11–79, 6:10	GB 17–13
Packers	3	3:37	D.Driver 68 yd. pass from B.Favre (D.Rayner kick)	2–68, 0:17	GB 24–13
Packers	4	13:37	D.Rayner 44 yd. Field Goal	6–32, 2:48	GB 27–13
Packers	4	8:47	D.Rayner 21 yd. Field Goal	7–15, 3:42	GB 30–13
49ers	4	5:16	V.Davis 52 yd. pass from A.Smith (kick aborted)	1–52, 0:11	GB 30–19

=== Week 15: vs. Detroit Lions ===
Quarter	1	2	3	4	Total
Lions	3	0	3	3	9
Packers	3	7	0	7	17

at Lambeau Field, Green Bay, Wisconsin

- Game time: 12:02 pm CST
- Game weather: Partly sunny; 41 °F (5 °C), Humidity 55%, Wind: W 10 mph; Wind Chill: 29 °F (−2 °C)
- Game attendance: 70,472
- Referee: Ed Hochuli
- TV announcers (Fox): Ron Pitts, Jesse Palmer, and Laura Okmin

==== Game summary ====
The Packers traveled back home to Lambeau Field to play the Detroit Lions. At the end of the first quarter, the game was tied after field goals by Dave Rayner and Jason Hanson. In the second quarter, the Packers took the lead with a fourteen-yard run by running back Vernand Morency. Before half time Brett Favre completed a 21-yard pass to Carlyle Holiday. This was Favre's 4,968th career completion, setting an NFL record previously held by Dan Marino. In the third quarter the Lions kicked their second field goal. In the fourth quarter, Brett Favre threw his third interception out of the Packers end zone which put the Lions at the twelve-yard line. The Lions were unable to score a touchdown and completed a field goal which put the Lions within one point of the Packers. On the next possession the Packers increased their lead to eight points when Vernand Morency ran 21 yards for his second touchdown of the day. On the Lions last possession of the game, the Packers sacked quarterback Jon Kitna twice to end the game.

Brett Favre, who set an NFL record for career completions finished the day with twenty completions out of 37 passes. He recorded 174 yards and three interceptions, two of which were in the red zone. The Packers defense limited the Lions to 142 yards, no touchdowns, and two of twelve completed third downs. The Lions leading rusher was quarterback Jon Kitna. The Packers sacked Kitna six times, a career-high of three from defensive tackle Cullen Jenkins, and two sacks from Aaron Kampman. Charles Woodson had a career-high sixth interception of the season.

With their 3rd-straight win over the Lions, the Packers improved to 6–8.

==== Scoring summary ====
Team	Qtr	Time	Play Description (Extra Point)	Drive Info	Score
Lions	1	7:23	J.Hanson 42 yd. Field Goal	8 plays, 30 yards in 3:54	DET 3–0
Packers	1	2:51	D.Rayner 24 yd. Field Goal	9–22, 3:03	Tied 3–3
Packers	2	5:35	V.Morency 14 yd. run (D.Rayner kick)	9–53, 4:14	GB 10–3
Lions	3	9:59	J.Hanson 42 yd. Field Goal	8–40, 3:57	GB 10–6
Lions	4	9:33	J.Hanson 23 yd. Field Goal	4–7, 2:07	GB 10–9
Packers	4	2:48	V.Morency 21 yd. run (D.Rayner kick)	12–78, 6:45	GB 17–9

=== Week 16 vs. Minnesota Vikings ===
Quarter	1	2	3	4	Total
Vikings	0	0	7	0	7
Packers	3	3	0	3	9

at Lambeau Field, Green Bay, Wisconsin

- Game time: 7:05 pm CST
- Game weather: Rain; 36 °F (2 °C), Humidity 89%, Wind: NE 10 mph
- Game attendance: 70,864
- Referee: Gene Steratore
- TV announcers (NFL Network): Bryant Gumbel, Cris Collinsworth, and Adam Schefter

==== Game summary ====
The Packers played at Lambeau Field for the second time in five days, a Thursday night game versus their divisional rivals, the Minnesota Vikings. The game was played on the third anniversary of the passing of Irv Favre, Brett Favre's father. In the first quarter, the Packers entered the red zone on each of their drives, but only scored once on a 38-yard field goal from kicker Dave Rayner. Rayner would miss his next two field goals. The Packers defence forced the Vikings to punt on all their possessions in the first half. The Packers scored on the final play of the half with a 44-yard field goal from Dave Rayner. In the third quarter cornerback Charles Woodson intercepted Vikings quarterback Tarvaris Jackson, marking his seventh interception of the season extending a career-high. Later in the third quarter, Brett Favre was intercepted by cornerback Fred Smoot. Smoot returned the interception into the end zone, gaining the first lead of the game for the Vikings. In the fourth quarter the Packers drove the ball into Vikings territory, but tight end Bubba Franks fumbled the ball at the two-yard line, turning possession over to the Vikings. The Packers drove the ball 41 yards on their next possession to set Dave Rayner in position to attempt a field goal. Rayner made a 44-yard field goal with 1:34 left in the game to give the packers a 9–7 lead. The Vikings were unable to score on their last possession which granted the Packers their seventh win of the season.

Despite scoring only nine points, the Packers recorded 19 first downs and 319 total yards. Brett Favre completed 26 of 50 passes, gaining 285 yards. Favre also recorded two interceptions. Defensively, the Packers limited the Vikings to three total first downs and a 2–14 first down rate. The Vikings punted ten times in the game. Packers defensive end, Aaron Kampman had three sacks in the game.

The game marked only the third time in NFL history when the losing team scored the only touchdown off a defensive turnover, the first coming from another 9–7 result at Lambeau Field between the Packers and Vikings with the Vikings beating the Packers in that contest.

==== Scoring summary ====
Team	Qtr	Time	Play Description (Extra Point)	Drive Info	Score
Packers	1	9:09	D.Rayner 38 yd. Field Goal	9 plays, 44 yards in 3:42	GB 3–0
Packers	2	0:00	D.Rayner 44 yd. Field Goal	5–19, 1:14	GB 6–0
Vikings	3	5:10	F.Smoot 47 yd. interception return (R.Longwell kick)	N/A	MIN 7–6
Packers	4	1:34	D.Rayner 44 yd. Field Goal	7–41, 3:13	GB 9–7

=== Week 17 at Chicago Bears ===
Quarter	1	2	3	4	Total
Packers	13	10	0	3	26
Bears	0	0	7	0	7

at Soldier Field, Chicago, Illinois

- Game time: 7:15 pm CST
- Game weather: 50 °F (10 °C), Humidity 81%, Wind: SW 10 mph
- Game attendance: 62,287
- Referee: Bill Vinovich
- TV announcers (NBC): Al Michaels, John Madden, and Andrea Kremer

==== Game summary ====
On New Year's Eve, the Packers traveled to Chicago to face the Bears at Soldier Field. The Bears had already clinched the #1 seed, however with the new NFL flexible-scheduling in effect the game was moved to the Sunday night because of possible playoff implications and the possibility of it being Brett Favre's last game.

However, the Packers were all but eliminated from the playoffs when the New York Giants effectively clinched the decisive tie-breaker (strength of victory) with a win on December 30. Technically, New York's victory on Saturday did not mathematically eliminate Green Bay, however it meant the Packers needed the results of eight other Sunday games besides their own to go their way (moreover, with the underdogs in each of those games winning) to still be able to qualify with a win. This did not happen, and so the Packers were conclusively eliminated before taking the field Sunday evening.

On the first drive of the game, the Packers drove the ball 75 yards, resulting in a 9-yard touchdown pass from Brett Favre to receiver Donald Driver. Later in the first quarter, Packers free safety Nick Collins intercepted quarterback Rex Grossman, returning the ball 55 yards for a touchdown. In the second quarter Rex Grossman threw his third interception of the game. Patrick Dendy returned the interception 33 yards for a touchdown. The Packers finished the half winning 23–0, with their defense forcing four turnovers.

Starting the second half, Brian Griese replaced Rex Grossman at quarterback. The Bears scored their first and only points of the game with a 75-yard touchdown pass to receiver Mark Bradley from Brian Griese in the third quarter. In the fourth quarter, the Packers increased their lead with a 46-yard field goal by Dave Rayner. The Bears had the ball only once in the fourth quarter. The drive ended in an interception by Nick Collins, recording his second of the game. Late in the game, Favre was replaced by quarterback Ingle Martin. Favre was carried off the field by Donald Driver, receiving many hugs by players and coaches. In an interview after the game, Favre broke down in tears. It was still at the time unclear whether Favre will retire or return to the Packers, but Favre announced in February that he would return to play with the Packers.

The Packers offense recorded 373 yards of offense. Brett Favre completed 21 of 42 passes with one touchdown and one interception. On defense, the Packers forced six turnovers. Five of the turnovers were interceptions. The Bears starting quarterback Rex Grossman recorded only a 0.0 quarterback rating in one half of play. With the win, the Packers moved to 8–8, improving on their record of 4–12 from the previous year.

==== Scoring summary ====
Team	Qtr	Time	Play Description (Extra Point)	Drive Info	Score
Packers	1	9:31	D.Driver 9 yd. pass from B.Favre (D.Rayner kick)	11 plays, 75 yards in 5:29	GB 7–0
Packers	1	0:50	N.Collins 55 yd. interception return (kick failed, hlu)	N/A	GB 13–0
Packers	2	0:49	D.Rayner 25 yd. Field Goal	10–50, 2:54	GB 16–0
Packers	2	0:34	P.Dendy 30 yd. interception return (D.Rayner kick)	N/A	GB 23–0
Bears	3	0:34	M.Bradley 75 yd. pass from B.Griese (R.Gould kick)	3–75, 0:54	GB 23–7
Packers	4	10:39	D.Rayner 46 yd. Field Goal	11–47, 4:55	GB 26–7

== Seasonal statistical leaders ==
- Passing Yards: Brett Favre 3,885 Yards
- Passing Touchdowns: Brett Favre 18 TD
- QB Rating: Brett Favre, 72.7
- Rushing Yards: Ahman Green, 1,059 Yards
- Rushing Touchdowns: Ahman Green, 5 TD
- Receiving Yards: Donald Driver, 1,295 Yards
- Receiving Touchdowns: Donald Driver, 8 TD
- Points: Dave Rayner, 109 points
- Kickoff Return Yards: Vernand Morency, 670 Yards
- Punt Return Yards: Charles Woodson, 363 Yards
- Tackles: A. J. Hawk, 119 Tackles
- Sacks: Aaron Kampman, 15.5 Sacks
- Interceptions: Charles Woodson, 8 Interceptions

== Awards and records ==
=== Hall of Famers ===
In 2006 Packer great Reggie White was inducted to the Pro Football Hall of Fame and was the lone inductee to the Green Bay Packers Hall of Fame
