= List of Furman Paladins in the NFL draft =

This is a list of Furman Paladins football players in the NFL draft.

== Key ==
B	Back	K	Kicker	NT	Nose tackle
C	Center	LB	Linebacker	FB	Fullback
DB	Defensive back	P	Punter	HB	Halfback
DE	Defensive end	QB	Quarterback	WR	Wide receiver
DT	Defensive tackle	RB	Running back	G	Guard
E	End	T	Offensive tackle	TE	Tight end

== Selections ==
Year	Round	Pick	Overall	Player	Team	Position
1940	3	4	19	Rhoten Shetley	Brooklyn Dodgers	B
1941	18	2	162	Bill Cornwall	Pittsburgh Steelers	T
1943	3	6	21	Dewey Proctor	New York Giants	B
1943	4	1	26	Ralph Hamer	Detroit Lions	B
1943	7	1	51	Paul Sizemore	Detroit Lions	E
1949	5	9	50	Tom Wham	Chicago Cardinals	E
1950	16	7	203	Harry Bierman	Chicago Cardinals	E
1950	29	2	367	Ed Jasonek	New York Bulldogs	B
1951	6	4	66	Ed Jasonek	Chicago Cardinals	B
1953	29	9	346	Bob Griffis	New York Giants	G
1954	5	5	54	Bob Griffis	Chicago Bears	G
1956	22	7	260	Johnny Popson	Green Bay Packers	B
1957	24	8	285	Bob Jennings	Washington Redskins	C
1957	30	9	358	Mike Shill	Detroit Lions	T
1962	11	8	148	Larry Jepson	San Francisco 49ers	C
1962	15	9	205	Joe Monte	Baltimore Colts	G
1963	7	11	95	Olin Hill	Green Bay Packers	T
1967	10	17	254	Lavern Barrs	St. Louis Cardinals	DB
1970	17	2	418	Joe Brunson	Chicago Bears	DT
1977	8	11	206	David Whitehurst	Green Bay Packers	QB
1984	3	9	65	Stanford Jennings	Cincinnati Bengals	RB
1984	6	11	151	Ernest Gibson	New England Patriots	DB
1985	10	19	271	Dennis Williams	St. Louis Cardinals	RB
1986	4	8	90	Charles Fox	Kansas City Chiefs	WR
1997	5	25	155	Luther Broughton	Philadelphia Eagles	TE
2000	4	14	108	John Keith	San Francisco 49ers	DB
2000	7	2	208	Desmond Kitchings	Kansas City Chiefs	WR
2006	5	15	148	Ingle Martin	Green Bay Packers	QB
2008	5	11	146	Jerome Felton	Detroit Lions	RB
2009	5	2	138	William Middleton	Atlanta Falcons	DB
2014	4	37	137	Dakota Dozier	New York Jets	T

== Notable undrafted players ==
Note: No drafts held before 1920

Debut year	Player name	Position	Debut NFL/AFL team	Notes
1960	Leo Bland	C	Green Bay Packers	—
1968	Sam Wyche	QB	Cincinnati Bengals	—
1978	Tom Southard	WR	St. Louis Cardinals	—
1987	Jerome Norris	S	Atlanta Falcons	—
1999	Orlando Ruff	LB	San Diego Chargers	—
2002	Trent Sansbury	TE	Cincinnati Bengals	—
2005	Cam Newton	S	Atlanta Falcons	—
2012	Ryan Steed	CB	New York Jets	—
2013	Sederrik Cunningham	WR	Green Bay Packers	—
2019	Bradford Lemmons	CB	Los Angeles Chargers	—
2023	Ryan Miller	WR	Tampa Bay Buccaneers	—
2024	Mason Pline	TE	San Francisco 49ers	—
