= Ingle Martin =

American football player (born 1982)

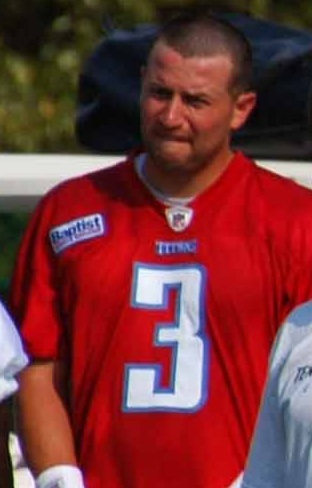
- Martin with the Tennessee Titans in 2008

No. 7, 3
- Position: Quarterback

Personal information
- Born: August 15, 1982 (age 44); Memphis, Tennessee, U.S.
- Listed height: 6 ft 2 in (1.88 m)
- Listed weight: 220 lb (100 kg)

Career information
- High school: Montgomery Bell (Nashville, Tennessee)
- College: Florida (2001–2003); Furman (2004–2005)
- NFL draft: 2006: 5th round, 148th overall pick

Career history

Playing
- Green Bay Packers (2006); Tennessee Titans (2007–2008)*; Kansas City Chiefs (2008); Denver Broncos (2009)*; New York Sentinels (2009)
- * Offseason or practice squad member only

Coaching
- Christ Presbyterian Academy (2010–present)

Awards and highlights
- First-team All-SoCon (2005); As a coach: 5× state championship (2014, 2018, 2020, 2023, 2024)

Career UFL statistics
- TD–INT: 1–5
- Passing yards: 380
- Completion %: 48.1
- Stats at Pro Football Reference

Harry Ingle Martin IV (born August 15, 1982) is an American former professional football player who was a quarterback in the National Football League (NFL) during the late 2000s. Martin played college football for the Florida Gators and Furman Paladins, and thereafter, he was selected by the Green Bay Packers in the fifth round of the 2006 NFL draft. He was also a member of the Tennessee Titans, Kansas City Chiefs and Denver Broncos of the NFL, and the New York Sentinels of the United Football League (UFL). After his playing career, Martin became the head football coach for Christ Presbyterian Academy, a private preparatory school in Nashville, Tennessee.

== Early life ==
Martin was born in Memphis, Tennessee, in 1982. He attended Montgomery Bell Academy in Nashville, Tennessee, and was a letterman in football, basketball, soccer and baseball. Martin led Montgomery Bell to three consecutive Tennessee state championships with thirty-two consecutive wins and final USA Today national Top 25 rankings in both 1999 and 2000.

While at Montgomery Bell, Martin was named to the Parade magazine high school All-American team, while also adding national honors from Prep Star, Super Prep and National Bluechips. He was ranked among the nation's top twenty quarterbacks by Prep Football Report and Super Prep ranked him the top player in Tennessee. Martin was also a two-time Division II Player of the Year in Tennessee.

As a junior, he completed 97 out of 140 passes for 1,450 yards and 14 touchdowns. As a senior in 2000, he completed 62 out of 137 passes for 964 yards with seven touchdowns and he also rushed for 935 yards. In 2000, he made six field goals in nine attempts in 2000, with three field goals of more than fifty yards, including a school-record kick of fifty-six yards.

== College career ==
=== Florida ===
Martin was heavily recruited by the Tennessee Volunteers, LSU Tigers, Alabama Crimson Tide and Virginia Cavaliers programs before accepting an athletic scholarship offer to attend the University of Florida in Gainesville, Florida. Martin played for coach Steve Spurrier and coach Ron Zook's Florida Gators football team from 2001 to 2003.

As a freshman, the Gators coaching staff decided to redshirt Martin and he worked as a member of Florida's scout team, winning the Gators' John Eibner Award, which is presented annually to the Gators scout team's "unsung hero." As a sophomore in 2002, he played in twelve of thirteen games, primarily as the backup to the starting quarterback, Rex Grossman, but he also served as the starting punter in seven games and played as a wide receiver in eight games. As a passer, he completed seven of ten passes for ninety-six yards, and also caught two passes for fourteen yards and rushed eleven times for fifty-one yards; as a punter, he averaged 35.2 yards on forty-six punts.

During his junior season in 2003, Martin started the first four games of the season before new head coach Ron Zook replaced him in the starting lineup with Chris Leak, one of the nation's top freshmen quarterback recruits, after Martin suffered a concussion against the Miami Hurricanes. After replacing Ingle in the fourth game of the season, Leak remained the starter for the rest of the year, placing Martin's quarterback career as a Gator in limbo. In Martin's four starts against San Jose State Spartans, Miami Hurricanes, Florida A&M Rattlers and Tennessee Volunteers, he completed forty-seven of seventy-seven passes (a 61.0% completion average) for 654 yards and three touchdowns, and a quarterback efficiency rating of 140.5.

=== Furman ===
After the end of his junior season at Florida, Martin transferred to Furman University in Greenville, South Carolina, where he had two successful years and set a number of passing records for the Furman Paladins football team.

In 2004, his first season at Furman, Martin led the most balanced offense in school history (an average of 226.2 rushing yards and 228.8 passing yards per game). He started all 13 games, completing 198 of 320 passes (61.9%) for 2,792 yards, 22 touchdowns and nine interceptions. Martin also carried 62 times for 292 yards (an average of 4.7 yards per attempt) and three touchdowns. He gained 3,084 yards on 382 plays, an average of 237.2 yards per game in total offense. Martin also punted 10 times for 308 yards (an average of 30.8 yards per punt, with six of his kicks being downed inside the 20-yard line.

In 2005, Martin was a Division I FCS first-team All-American selection at quarterback by The Sports Network, and earned first-team All-American honors as a punter from 1-AA.org. He also won All-Southern Conference first-team honors at both quarterback and punter. Martin was named All-South Carolina as a quarterback by the South Carolina state sportswriters. He also won, Furman's Vince Perone (team most valuable player) Award following his senior season.

Martin served as team captain, starting 14 games. On the season, he completed 212 of 349 passes attempted (60.7%) for 2,959 yards, a new team single-season record, 20 touchdowns (second behind his 2004 total) and 13 interceptions. He also rushed 77 times for 232 yards (an average of 3.0 yards per attempt) and five touchdowns. Martin accounted for 3,193 yards in total offense, also a school record, on 426 plays, an average of 227.9 yards per game. He punted 34 times for 1,446 yards (an average of 43.2 yards per punt—third-best season record in team history) with the longest being 70 yards, as 11 kicks were downed inside the 20-yard line and eight others resulted in fair catches. Only 13 of Martin's punts were returned, finishing with a 38.79-yard net average.

Martin started every game during his two seasons at Furman, setting new school records for passing yards (5,761), passing touchdowns (42), and total offense (6,277), while finishing second in career touchdown completions (50) and passer rating (147.65), and third in completion percentage (61.3%, 410-of-669). Martin also rushed the ball 139 times for 524 yards (3.8 avg) and eight touchdowns, accounting for 6,275 yards in total offense on 808 plays. He also punted 44 times for 1,754 yards (39.9 avg) with 17 kicks downed inside the 20-yard line while only 24 of his punts were returned, finishing with a 36.27-yard net average.

== Professional playing career ==
Pre-draft measurables
Height	Weight	Arm length	Hand span	40-yard dash	10-yard split	20-yard split	20-yard shuttle	Three-cone drill	Vertical jump	Broad jump
6 ft 2 1/4 in (1.89 m)	220 lb (100 kg)	31 in (0.79 m)	9 1/2 in (0.24 m)	4.65 s	1.61 s	2.73 s	4.17 s	7.13 s	36.0 in (0.91 m)	9 ft 3 in (2.82 m)
All values from NFL Combine

=== Overall NFL stats ===
Although he was on the roster for multiple seasons, Martin was only on field for a total of 2 plays during one single game of his NFL career.

=== Green Bay Packers ===
Martin was selected in the fifth round of the 2006 NFL draft by the Green Bay Packers. Martin signed with the Packers on July 28, 2006. He served as the Packers third-string quarterback behind former first round pick Aaron Rodgers and starter Brett Favre. On August 25, 2007, he was released by the Packers.

=== Tennessee Titans ===
The Tennessee Titans signed Martin to their practice squad on September 2, 2007. Martin was released during final cuts on August 30, 2008.

=== Kansas City Chiefs ===
After Kansas City Chiefs starting quarterback Brodie Croyle suffered a shoulder injury in the team's regular season opener, the Chiefs signed Martin to their active roster off Tennessee's practice squad. He was released on November 7 when the team signed safety Oliver Celestin. The Chiefs re-signed Martin to the practice squad on November 12. Following the 2008 season, Martin was re-signed to a future contract on January 12, 2009. He was waived on August 5.

=== Denver Broncos ===
Martin was signed by the Denver Broncos on August 26, 2009, after an injury to quarterback Chris Simms. He was waived on September 4.

=== New York Sentinels ===
Following his NFL career, Martin left for the UFL. He joined one of 6 inaugural teams of the UFL, the Sentinels. However, he left after only a season, and UFL folded in 2012.

== Coaching career ==
Since 2011, Martin has been the head high school football coach at Christ Presbyterian Academy, a private school located in Nashville, Tennessee, where his wife also served as the varsity softball coach until she retired in 2014.

== Family ==
Martin's wife, Jennifer, is an alumna of the University of Alabama who made two trips to the College World Series with the Alabama Crimson Tide softball team. His father-in-law, Mike Wright, was a 12th-round selection (308th pick overall) of Cincinnati Bengals in the 1980 NFL draft. Wright was also drafted by the Detroit Tigers of Major League Baseball (MLB).

== See also ==
- List of Furman Paladins in the NFL draft
- List of Furman University alumni
