= Chris Francies =

American football player (born 1982)

No. 83, 80
- Position: Wide receiver

Personal information
- Born: July 26, 1982 (age 44); Houston, Texas, U.S.
- Listed height: 6 ft 1 in (1.85 m)
- Listed weight: 203 lb (92 kg)

Career information
- High school: Cypress Falls (Houston)
- College: Texas-El Paso
- NFL draft: 2006: undrafted

Career history
- Green Bay Packers (2006–2007); New Orleans Saints (2008)*; San Francisco 49ers (2009)*; Utah Blaze (2010); Georgia Force (2011)*
- * Offseason or practice squad member only

Awards and highlights
- Third-team All-Conference USA (2005)

Career NFL statistics
- Receptions: 2
- Receiving yards: 16
- Stats at Pro Football Reference

Christopher Cerell Francies [FRAN-sis] (born July 26, 1982) is an American former professional football player who was a wide receiver in the National Football League (NFL). He played college football for the UTEP Miners and was signed by the Green Bay Packers as an undrafted free agent in 2006. Francies was also a member of the New Orleans Saints and San Francisco 49ers of the NFL, and the Utah Blaze and Georgia Force of the Arena Football League (AFL).

== College career ==
Francies played for Cypress Falls High School in Houston. He was recruited by the University of Texas at El Paso (UTEP), where he was a wide receiver.

He majored in biology and was a four-year letterman in football and a three-year starter. As a senior, he won third-team All-Conference USA accolades and was named the team's Offensive M.V.P. and as a junior, he was an All-Western Athletic Conference Honorable Mention selection.

== Professional career ==
=== Green Bay Packers ===
After playing two seasons with the Packers, Francies was released on August 25, 2008.

=== New Orleans Saints ===
Francies was signed to the practice squad of the New Orleans Saints on November 19, 2008.

=== San Francisco 49ers ===
Francies signed with the San Francisco 49ers on August 7, 2009. He was waived on August 30.
