= List of Norfolk State Spartans football seasons =

The following is a list of Norfolk State Spartans football seasons for the football team that has represented Norfolk State University in NCAA competition.

== Results (2005–present) ==
Season	All Games	Regular season	Conference	Postseason Play	Sports Network Poll Ranking	Coaches Poll Ranking
2005	4–7	4–7	2–6			
2006	4–7	4–7	1–7			
2007	8–3	8–3	6–2			
2008	5–7	5–7	3–5			
2009	0–4 (Note: All 2009 Norfolk State football wins were stripped by the NCAA in 2016)	0–4	0–3			
2010	0–5 (Note: All 2010 Norfolk State football wins were stripped by the NCAA in 2016)	0–4				
2011	0–3 (Note: All 2011 Norfolk State football wins and the 2011 MEAC football title were stripped by the NCAA in 2016)	0–2	0–1	0–1	#19	#18
2012	4–7	4–7	2–6			
2013	3–9	3–9	3–5			
2014	4–8	4–8	4–4			
2015	4–7	4–7	4–4			
2016	4–7	4–7	3–5			
2017	4–7	4–7	4–4			
2018	4–7	4–7	2–5			
2019	5–7	5–7	4–4			
2021	6–5	6–5	2–3			
2022	2–9	2–9	2–3			
2023	3–8	3–8	1–4			
2024	4–8	4–8	2–3			
