= 2005 Bethune–Cookman Wildcats football team =

American college football season

2005 Bethune–Cookman Wildcats football
- Conference: Mid-Eastern Athletic Conference
- Record: 7–4 (4–7 MEAC)
- Head coach: Alvin Wyatt (9th season)
- Home stadium: Municipal Stadium

2005 Mid-Eastern Athletic Conference football standings
	Conf.			Overall
Team	W		L	W		L
No. 10 Hampton $^	8	–	0	11	–	1
No. 20 South Carolina State	7	–	1	9	–	2
Delaware State	6	–	2	7	–	4
Florida A&M	5	–	3	6	–	5
Bethune–Cookman	4	–	4	7	–	4
Norfolk State	2	–	6	4	–	7
North Carolina A&T	2	–	6	3	–	8
Howard	1	–	7	4	–	7
Morgan State	1	–	7	2	–	9
$ – Conference champion; ^ – NCAA Division I-AA playoff participant; Rankings from The Sports Network poll

The 2005 Bethune–Cookman Wildcats football team represented Bethune–Cookman College (now known as Bethune–Cookman University) as a member of the Mid-Eastern Athletic Conference (MEAC) during the 2005 NCAA Division I-AA football season. Led by ninth-year head coach Alvin Wyatt, the Wildcats compiled an overall record of 7–4, with a mark of 4–4 in conference play, and finished fifth in the MEAC.

== Schedule ==
Date	Opponent	Site	Result	Attendance	Source
September 3	Elizabeth City State*	Municipal Stadium; Daytona Beach, FL	W 34–7		
September 10	Arkansas–Pine Bluff*	Municipal Stadium; Daytona Beach, FL	W 31–17	5,624	
September 17	vs. South Carolina State	Alltel Stadium; Jacksonville, FL (Gateway Classic)	L 24–27	18,648	
September 24	at Norfolk State	William "Dick" Price Stadium; Norfolk, VA	W 63–61 ^{4OT}	7,428	
October 1	Morgan State	Municipal Stadium; Daytona Beach, FL	W 44–26	10,580	
October 8	at Delaware State	Alumni Stadium; Dover, DE	L 0–17	1,439	
October 15	vs. Savannah State*	Butler High School Stadium; Augusta, GA (Central Savannah River Area Classic)	W 56–13	8,883	
October 29	at North Carolina A&T	Aggie Stadium; Greensboro, NC	W 54–17		
November 5	No. 3 Hampton	Municipal Stadium; Daytona Beach, FL	L 10–24	8,954	
November 12	at Howard	William H. Greene Stadium; Washington, DC	W 45–16		
November 19	vs. Florida A&M	Florida Citrus Bowl; Orlando, FL (Florida Classic)	L 23–26 ^{OT}	70,112	
*Non-conference game; Rankings from The Sports Network Poll released prior to the game
