= 2005 Wofford Terriers football team =

American college football season

2005 Wofford Terriers football
- Conference: Southern Conference
- Record: 6–5 (3–4 SoCon)
- Head coach: Mike Ayers (18th season)
- Home stadium: Gibbs Stadium

2005 Southern Conference football standings
	Conf.			Overall
Team	W		L	W		L
No. 1 Appalachian State $^	6	–	1	12	–	3
No. 3 Furman ^	5	–	2	11	–	3
No. 9 Georgia Southern ^	5	–	2	8	–	4
Western Carolina	4	–	3	5	–	4
Wofford	3	–	4	6	–	5
Chattanooga	3	–	4	6	–	5
The Citadel	2	–	5	4	–	7
Elon	0	–	7	3	–	8
$ – Conference champion; ^ – NCAA Division I-AA playoff participant; Rankings from The Sports Network I-AA Poll

The 2005 Wofford Terriers football team was an American football team that represented Wofford College as a member of the Southern Conference (SoCon) during the 2005 NCAA Division I-AA football season. Led by 18th-year head coach Mike Ayers, the Terriers compiled and overall record of 6–5, with a mark of 3–4 in conference play, and finished tied for fifth in the SoCon.

== Schedule ==
Date	Time	Opponent	Rank	Site	TV	Result	Attendance	Source
September 3	7:00 p.m.	Georgetown (KY)*		Gibbs Stadium; Spartanburg, SC		W 34–24	5,371	
September 10	6:00 p.m.	at West Virginia*		Milan Puskar Stadium; Morgantown, WV		L 7–35	54,630	
September 17	7:00 p.m.	No. 14 Georgia Southern		Gibbs Stadium; Spartanburg, SC		W 27–26	29,303	
October 1	4:00 p.m.	at Chattanooga	No. 22	Finley Stadium; Chattanooga, TN		L 13–25	7,046	
October 8	1:30 p.m.	Elon		Gibbs Stadium; Spartanburg, SC		W 14–9	7,129	
October 15	1:30 p.m.	VMI*		Gibbs Stadium; Spartanburg, SC		W 38–23	5,111	
October 22	1:00 p.m.	No. 16 Appalachian State		Gibbs Stadium; Spartanburg, SC	CSS	L 17–49	8,398	
October 29	4:00 p.m.	at The Citadel		Johnson Hagood Stadium; Charleston, SC (rivalry)	SCETV	W 28–10	11,290	
November 5	2:00 p.m.	at Western Carolina		E. J. Whitmire Stadium; Cullowhee, NC		L 0–24	8,021	
November 12	12:30 p.m.	at No. 4 Furman		Paladin Stadium; Greenville, SC (rivalry)		L 21–34	13,764	
November 19	12:00 p.m.	at Gardner–Webb*		Ernest W. Spangler Stadium; Boiling Springs, NC		W 56–42	2,500	
*Non-conference game; Rankings from The Sports Network Poll released prior to the game; All times are in Eastern time
