= 2005 Delaware State Hornets football team =

American college football season

2005 Delaware State Hornets football
- Conference: Mid-Eastern Athletic Conference
- Record: 7–4 (6–2 MEAC)
- Head coach: Al Lavan (2nd season)
- Home stadium: Alumni Stadium

2005 Mid-Eastern Athletic Conference football standings
| | Conf. | | | Overall |
| Team | W | | L | W | | L |
|---|---|---|---|---|---|---|
| No. 10 Hampton $^ | 8 | – | 0 | 11 | – | 1 |
| No. 20 South Carolina State | 7 | – | 1 | 9 | – | 2 |
| Delaware State | 6 | – | 2 | 7 | – | 4 |
| Florida A&M | 5 | – | 3 | 6 | – | 5 |
| Bethune–Cookman | 4 | – | 4 | 7 | – | 4 |
| Norfolk State | 2 | – | 6 | 4 | – | 7 |
| North Carolina A&T | 2 | – | 6 | 3 | – | 8 |
| Howard | 1 | – | 7 | 4 | – | 7 |
| Morgan State | 1 | – | 7 | 2 | – | 9 |
$ – Conference champion; ^ – NCAA Division I-AA playoff participant; Rankings from The Sports Network poll

The 2005 Delaware State Hornets football team represented Delaware State University as a member of the Mid-Eastern Athletic Conference (MEAC) in the 2005 NCAA Division I-AA football season. The Hornets were led by second-year head coach Al Lavan and played their home games at Alumni Stadium. They finished the season 7–4 overall and 6–2 in conference play to place in third in the MEAC.

== Schedule ==
| Date | Time | Opponent | Site | Result | Attendance | Source |
|---|---|---|---|---|---|---|
| September 3 | 7:00 p.m. | at Florida A&M | Bragg Memorial Stadium; Tallahassee, FL | W 21–17 | 13,814 | |
| September 10 | 2:00 p.m. | Millersville* | Alumni Stadium; Dover, DE | W 38–6 | 3,107 | |
| September 17 | 6:00 p.m. | at No. 8 James Madison* | Bridgeforth Stadium; Harrisonburg, VA | L 7–65 | 13,645 | |
| September 24 | 7:00 p.m. | at Coastal Carolina* | Brooks Stadium; Conway, SC | L 6–24 | 8,267 | |
| October 1 | 6:00 p.m. | at No. 9 Hampton | Armstrong Stadium; Hampton, VA | L 8–26 | 10,130 | |
| October 8 | 1:00 p.m. | Bethune–Cookman | Alumni Stadium; Dover, DE | W 17–0 | 1,439 | |
| October 15 | 1:30 p.m. | at North Carolina A&T | Aggie Stadium; Greensboro, NC | W 23–13 | 22,137 | |
| October 22 | 12:00 p.m. | Morgan State | Alumni Stadium; Dover, DE | W 41–14 | 2,841 | |
| October 29 | 1:00 p.m. | at No. 23 South Carolina State | Oliver C. Dawson Stadium; Orangeburg, SC | L 3–24 | 20,050 | |
| November 12 | 12:00 p.m. | Norfolk State | Alumni Stadium; Dover, DE | W 38–17 | 2,841 | |
| November 19 | 12:00 p.m. | Howard | Alumni Stadium; Dover, DE | W 23–7 | 2,315 | |
*Non-conference game; Rankings from The Sports Network Poll released prior to the game
