= 2005 Appalachian State Mountaineers football team =

American college football season

2005 Appalachian State Mountaineers football

NCAA Division I-AA champion SoCon champion

NCAA Division I-AA Championship, W 21–16 vs. Northern Iowa
- Conference: Southern Conference

Ranking
- Sports Network: No. 1
- Record: 12–3 (6–1 Southern)
- Head coach: Jerry Moore (17th season)
- Offensive coordinator: Collaborative
- Offensive scheme: Multiple spread
- Defensive coordinator: John Wiley (15th season)
- Base defense: 4–3
- Home stadium: Kidd Brewer Stadium

2005 Southern Conference football standings
| | Conf. | | | Overall |
| Team | W | | L | W | | L |
|---|---|---|---|---|---|---|
| No. 1 Appalachian State $^ | 6 | – | 1 | 12 | – | 3 |
| No. 3 Furman ^ | 5 | – | 2 | 11 | – | 3 |
| No. 9 Georgia Southern ^ | 5 | – | 2 | 8 | – | 4 |
| Western Carolina | 4 | – | 3 | 5 | – | 4 |
| Wofford | 3 | – | 4 | 6 | – | 5 |
| Chattanooga | 3 | – | 4 | 6 | – | 5 |
| The Citadel | 2 | – | 5 | 4 | – | 7 |
| Elon | 0 | – | 7 | 3 | – | 8 |
$ – Conference champion; ^ – NCAA Division I-AA playoff participant; Rankings from The Sports Network poll

The 2005 Appalachian State Mountaineers football team represented Appalachian State University as a member of the Southern Conference (SoCon) in the 2005 NCAA Division I-AA football season. The team was led by 17th-year head coach Jerry Moore and played their home games at Kidd Brewer Stadium in Boone, North Carolina.

The Mountaineers won the NCAA Division I-AA Football Championship. Appalachian State is the only university in North Carolina, public or private, to win a National Collegiate Athletic Association (NCAA) national championship in football.

== Schedule ==
| Date | Time | Opponent | Rank | Site | TV | Result | Attendance | Source |
|---|---|---|---|---|---|---|---|---|
| September 3 | 6:30 p.m. | at Eastern Kentucky* | | Roy Kidd Stadium; Richmond, KY | | W 24–16 | 10,300 | |
| September 10 | 7:00 p.m. | at Kansas* | No. 25 | Memorial Stadium; Lawrence, KS | | L 8–36 | 37,070 | |
| September 17 | 3:30 p.m. | No. 17 Coastal Carolina* | | Kidd Brewer Stadium; Boone, NC | | W 30–3 | 23,267 | |
| September 24 | 4:00 p.m. | at The Citadel | No. 22 | Johnson Hagood Stadium; Charleston, SC | | W 45–13 | 11,103 | |
| October 8 | 3:00 p.m. | at No. 6 Furman | No. 16 | Paladin Stadium; Greenville, SC | CSS | L 31–34 | 14,138 | |
| October 15 | 3:30 p.m. | No. 16 Georgia Southern | No. 19 | Kidd Brewer Stadium; Boone, NC (Black Saturday) | FSNS | W 24–7 | 21,486 | |
| October 22 | 1:00 p.m. | at Wofford | No. 16 | Gibbs Stadium; Spartanburg, SC | CSS | W 49–17 | 8,398 | |
| October 29 | 3:30 p.m. | Chattanooga^{†} | No. 12 | Kidd Brewer Stadium; Boone, NC | CSS | W 35–25 | 22,338 | |
| November 5 | 8:00 p.m. | at No. 6 (I-A) LSU* | No. 7 | Tiger Stadium; Baton Rouge, LA | | L 0–24 | 91,414 | |
| November 12 | 3:30 p.m. | Western Carolina | No. 8 | Kidd Brewer Stadium; Boone, NC (rivalry) | CSS | W 35–7 | 25,584 | |
| November 19 | 6:00 p.m. | at Elon | No. 6 | Rhodes Stadium; Elon, NC | | W 52–14 | 6,472 | |
| November 26 | 2:00 p.m. | No. 25 Lafayette* | No. 5 | Kidd Brewer Stadium; Boone, NC (NCAA Division I-AA First Round) | | W 34–23 | 6,327 | |
| December 3 | 2:30 p.m. | No. 8 Southern Illinois* | No. 5 | Kidd Brewer Stadium; Boone, NC (NCAA Division I-AA Quarterfinal) | ESPNU | W 38–24 | 11,108 | |
| December 10 | 12:00 p.m. | No. 3 Furman* | No. 5 | Kidd Brewer Stadium; Boone, NC (NCAA Division I-AA Semifinal) | ESPN2 | W 29–23 | 15,307 | |
| December 16 | 8:00 p.m. | vs. No. 7 Northern Iowa* | No. 5 | Finley Stadium; Chattanooga, TN (NCAA Division I-AA Championship Game) | ESPN2 | W 21–16 | 20,236 | |
*Non-conference game; ^{†}Homecoming; Rankings from The Sports Network Poll released prior to the game; All times are in Eastern time

== Game summaries ==
=== Eastern Kentucky ===
| | 1 | 2 | 3 | 4 | Total |
|---|---|---|---|---|---|
| Appalachian State | 7 | 7 | 7 | 3 | 24 |
| Eastern Kentucky | 7 | 0 | 0 | 9 | 16 |

=== Kansas ===
| | 1 | 2 | 3 | 4 | Total |
|---|---|---|---|---|---|
| Appalachian State | 0 | 0 | 0 | 8 | 8 |
| Kansas | 7 | 6 | 13 | 10 | 36 |

=== Coastal Carolina ===
| | 1 | 2 | 3 | 4 | Total |
|---|---|---|---|---|---|
| Coastal Carolina | 0 | 0 | 3 | 0 | 3 |
| Appalachian State | 13 | 17 | 0 | 0 | 30 |

=== The Citadel ===
| | 1 | 2 | 3 | 4 | Total |
|---|---|---|---|---|---|
| Appalachian State | 7 | 14 | 7 | 17 | 45 |
| The Citadel | 7 | 0 | 6 | 0 | 13 |

=== Furman ===
| | 1 | 2 | 3 | 4 | Total |
|---|---|---|---|---|---|
| Appalachian State | 7 | 7 | 3 | 14 | 31 |
| Furman | 7 | 9 | 10 | 8 | 34 |

=== Georgia Southern ===
| | 1 | 2 | 3 | 4 | Total |
|---|---|---|---|---|---|
| Georgia Southern | 0 | 0 | 7 | 0 | 7 |
| Appalachian State | 10 | 7 | 7 | 0 | 24 |

=== Wofford ===
| | 1 | 2 | 3 | 4 | Total |
|---|---|---|---|---|---|
| Appalachian State | 7 | 14 | 14 | 14 | 49 |
| Wofford | 7 | 3 | 0 | 7 | 17 |

=== Chattanooga ===
| | 1 | 2 | 3 | 4 | Total |
|---|---|---|---|---|---|
| Chattanooga | 6 | 7 | 6 | 6 | 25 |
| Appalachian State | 0 | 14 | 14 | 7 | 35 |

=== LSU ===
| | 1 | 2 | 3 | 4 | Total |
|---|---|---|---|---|---|
| Appalachian State | 0 | 0 | 0 | 0 | 0 |
| LSU | 7 | 7 | 0 | 10 | 24 |

=== Western Carolina ===
| | 1 | 2 | 3 | 4 | Total |
|---|---|---|---|---|---|
| Western Carolina | 0 | 0 | 0 | 7 | 7 |
| Appalachian State | 7 | 14 | 7 | 7 | 35 |

=== Elon ===
| | 1 | 2 | 3 | 4 | Total |
|---|---|---|---|---|---|
| Appalachian State | 10 | 21 | 7 | 14 | 52 |
| Elon | 0 | 0 | 0 | 14 | 14 |

=== Lafayette ===
| | 1 | 2 | 3 | 4 | Total |
|---|---|---|---|---|---|
| Lafayette | 0 | 17 | 3 | 3 | 23 |
| Appalachian State | 3 | 7 | 10 | 14 | 34 |

=== Southern Illinois ===
| | 1 | 2 | 3 | 4 | Total |
|---|---|---|---|---|---|
| Southern Illinois | 0 | 3 | 7 | 14 | 24 |
| Appalachian State | 10 | 14 | 7 | 7 | 38 |

=== Furman ===
| | 1 | 2 | 3 | 4 | Total |
|---|---|---|---|---|---|
| Furman | 0 | 23 | 0 | 0 | 23 |
| Appalachian State | 14 | 7 | 0 | 8 | 29 |

=== Northern Iowa ===
| | 1 | 2 | 3 | 4 | Total |
|---|---|---|---|---|---|
| Appalachian State | 0 | 7 | 7 | 7 | 21 |
| Northern Iowa | 6 | 10 | 0 | 0 | 16 |

== Rankings ==
Ranking movements Legend: ██ Increase in ranking ██ Decrease in ranking — = Not ranked
| | Week | | | | | | | | | | | | | |
| Poll | Pre | 1 | 2 | 3 | 4 | 5 | 6 | 7 | 8 | 9 | 10 | 11 | 12 | Final |
|---|---|---|---|---|---|---|---|---|---|---|---|---|---|---|
| The Sports Network | — | 25 | — | 22 | 17 | 16 | 19 | 16 | 12 | 7 | 8 | 6 | 5 | 1 |

== Awards and honors ==
- Southern Conference Coach of the Year (coaches and media) — Jerry Moore
- Southern Conference Roy M. "Legs" Hawley Offensive Player of the Year (media) — Richie Williams
- Southern Conference Offensive Player of the Year (coaches) — Richie Williams
- Southern Conference Jacobs Blocking Trophy — Matt Isenhour

== Statistics ==
=== Team ===
| | ASU | Opp |
|---|---|---|
| Scoring | 455 | 282 |
| Points per game | 30.3 | 18.8 |
| First downs | 317 | 299 |
| Rushing | 155 | 156 |
| Passing | 143 | 117 |
| Penalty | 19 | 26 |
| Total offense | 6,347 | 4,963 |
| Avg per play | 6.3 | 4.7 |
| Avg per game | 423.1 | 330.9 |
| Fumbles–Lost | 26–13 | 20–11 |
| Penalties–Yards | 106–936 | 85–770 |
| Avg per game | 62.4 | 51.3 |

| | ASU | Opp |
|---|---|---|
| Punts–Yards | 58–2,187 | 76–2,953 |
| Avg per punt | 37.7 | 38.9 |
| Time of possession/Game | 28:33 | 31:27 |
| 3rd down conversions | 87 for 187 | 86 for 222 |
| 4th down conversions | 10 for 21 | 12 for 22 |
| Touchdowns scored | 61 | 34 |
| Field goals–Attempts | 9–17 | 17–24 |
| PAT–Attempts | 58–59 | 25–99 |
| Attendance | 125,417 | 178,895 |
| Games/Avg per Game | 7/17,917 | 7/25,556 |

==== Scores by quarter ====
| | 1 | 2 | 3 | 4 | Total |
|---|---|---|---|---|---|
| Opponents | 54 | 85 | 55 | 88 | 282 |
| Mountaineers | 95 | 150 | 90 | 120 | 455 |
