= 2005 Furman Paladins football team =

American college football season

2005 Furman Paladins football

NCAA Division I-AA Semifinal, L 23–29 vs. Appalachian State
- Conference: Southern Conference
- Record: 11–3 (5–2 SoCon)
- Head coach: Bobby Lamb (4th season)
- Captains: Patrick Covington; Ingle Martin; Brandon Mays; William Freeman; Maurice Duncan
- Home stadium: Paladin Stadium

2005 Southern Conference football standings
	Conf.			Overall
Team	W		L	W		L
No. 1 Appalachian State $^	6	–	1	12	–	3
No. 3 Furman ^	5	–	2	11	–	3
No. 9 Georgia Southern ^	5	–	2	8	–	4
Western Carolina	4	–	3	5	–	4
Wofford	3	–	4	6	–	5
Chattanooga	3	–	4	6	–	5
The Citadel	2	–	5	4	–	7
Elon	0	–	7	3	–	8
$ – Conference champion; ^ – NCAA Division I-AA playoff participant; Rankings from The Sports Network poll

The 2005 Furman Paladins football team represented Furman University as a member of the Southern Conference (SoCon) during the 2005 NCAA Division I-AA football season. Led by fourth-year head coach Bobby Lamb, the Paladins compiled and overall record of 11–3 with a mark of 5–2 in conference play, trying for second place in the SoCon. Furman advanced to the NCAA Division I-AA Football Championship playoff, where they beat Nicholls State in the first round and Richmond in the quarterfinals before falling to SoCon and eventual national champion Appalachian State in the semifinals.

== Schedule ==
Date	Opponent	Rank	Site	TV	Result	Attendance	Source
September 1	at No. 20 Jacksonville State*	No. 2	Paul Snow Stadium; Jacksonville, AL		W 37–35	14,000	
September 10	at Western Carolina	No. 2	E. J. Whitmire Stadium; Cullowhee, NC		L 21–41	9,847	
September 17	Samford*	No. 10	Paladin Stadium; Greenville, SC		W 45–23	13,452	
September 24	No. 17 Hofstra*	No. 9	Paladin Stadium; Greenville, SC		W 44–41 ^{2OT}	9,884	
October 1	Gardner–Webb*	No. 7	Paladin Stadium; Greenville, SC		W 48–31	10,127	
October 8	No. 16 Appalachian State	No. 6	Paladin Stadium; Greenville, SC	CSS	W 34–31	14,138	
October 15	at The Citadel	No. 5	Johnson Hagood Stadium; Charleston, SC (rivalry)		W 39–31 ^{3OT}	12,880	
October 22	Elon	No. 2	Paladin Stadium; Greenville, SC		W 45–6	11,916	
November 5	at No. 14 Georgia Southern	No. 1	Paulson Stadium; Statesboro, GA		L 24–27	19,808	
November 12	Wofford	No. 4	Paladin Stadium; Greenville, SC (rivalry)		W 34–21	13,764	
November 19	at Chattanooga	No. 3	Finley Stadium; Chattanooga, TN		W 56–35	5,548	
November 26	No. 21 Nicholls State*	No. 3	Paladin Stadium; Greenville, SC (NCAA Division I-AA First Round)		W 14–12	4,125	
December 3	at No. 12 Richmond*	No. 3	University of Richmond Stadium; Richmond, VA (NCAA Division I-AA Quarterfinal)	ESPNU/ESPNGP	W 24–20	6,603	
December 10	at No. 5 Appalachian State*	No. 3	Kidd Brewer Stadium; Boone, NC (NCAA Division I-AA Semifinal)		L 23–29	15,307	
*Non-conference game; Rankings from The Sports Network Poll released prior to the game
