= 2005 Elon Phoenix football team =

American college football season

2005 Elon Phoenix football
- Conference: Southern Conference
- Record: 3–8 (0–7 SoCon)
- Head coach: Paul Hamilton (2nd season)
- Home stadium: Rhodes Stadium

2005 Southern Conference football standings
	Conf.			Overall
Team	W		L	W		L
No. 1 Appalachian State $^	6	–	1	12	–	3
No. 3 Furman ^	5	–	2	11	–	3
No. 9 Georgia Southern ^	5	–	2	8	–	4
Western Carolina	4	–	3	5	–	4
Wofford	3	–	4	6	–	5
Chattanooga	3	–	4	6	–	5
The Citadel	2	–	5	4	–	7
Elon	0	–	7	3	–	8
$ – Conference champion; ^ – NCAA Division I-AA playoff participant; Rankings from The Sports Network I-AA Poll

The 2005 Elon Phoenix football team was an American football team that represented Elon University as a member of the Southern Conference (SoCon) during the 2005 NCAA Division I-AA football season. Led by second-year head coach Paul Hamilton, the Phoenix compiled an overall record of 3–8, with a mark of 0–7 in conference play, and finished eighth in the SoCon.

== Schedule ==
Date	Time	Opponent	Site	Result	Attendance	Source
September 3	6:00 p.m.	Coastal Carolina*	Rhodes Stadium; Elon, NC	L 10–17	7,462	
September 10	6:00 p.m.	at Savannah State*	Ted Wright Stadium; Savannah, GA	W 48–14	3,011	
September 17	2:00 p.m.	Presbyterian*	Rhodes Stadium; Elon, NC	W 34–19	8,116	
September 24	6:00 p.m.	North Carolina A&T*	Rhodes Stadium; Elon, NC	W 12–9	9,250	
October 1	7:00 p.m.	Georgia Southern	Rhodes Stadium; Elon, NC	L 7–49	9,875	
October 8	1:30 p.m.	at Wofford	Gibbs Stadium; Spartanburg, SC	L 9–14	7,129	
October 15	6:00 p.m.	Chattanooga	Rhodes Stadium; Elon, NC	L 7–10	3,118	
October 22	2:00 p.m.	at No. 2 Furman	Paladin Stadium; Greenville, SC	L 6–45	11,916	
October 29	2:00 p.m.	at Western Carolina	E. J. Whitmire Stadium; Cullowhee, NC	L 26–31	10,137	
November 12	2:00 p.m.	at The Citadel	Johnson Hagood Stadium; Charleston, SC	L 0–21	12,780	
November 19	6:00 p.m.	No. 6 Appalachian State	Rhodes Stadium; Elon, NC	L 14–52	6,472	
*Non-conference game; Rankings from The Sports Network Poll released prior to the game; All times are in Eastern time
