= 2005 VMI Keydets football team =

American college football season

2005 VMI Keydets football
- Conference: Big South Conference
- Record: 3–8 (2–2 Big South)
- Head coach: Cal McCombs (7th season)
- Offensive coordinator: Will McCombs (2nd season)
- Defensive coordinator: Johnny Burnett (4th season)
- Home stadium: Alumni Memorial Field

2005 Big South Conference football standings
	Conf.			Overall
Team	W		L	W		L
No. 24 Coastal Carolina +	3	–	1	9	–	2
Charleston Southern +	3	–	1	7	–	4
Gardner–Webb	2	–	2	5	–	6
VMI	2	–	2	3	–	8
Liberty	0	–	4	1	–	10
+ – Conference co-champions; Rankings from The Sports Network poll

The 2005 VMI Keydets football team represented the Virginia Military Institute during the 2005 NCAA Division I FCS football season. It was the Keydets' 115th year of football, and their 3rd season in the Big South Conference.

After opening the year with a shutout win over Davidson, VMI lost its next three games to William & Mary, FBS-Duke, and Lehigh. They rebounded by winning two straight conference games over Charleston Southern, 34–12, and Liberty, 10–7, but ending the year on a five-game losing streak to end the season at 3–8 and 2–2 in Big South play, including a 22–14 loss to The Citadel in the Military Classic of the South.

== Schedule ==
Date	Time	Opponent	Site	Result	Attendance	Source
September 3	1:00 p.m.	Davidson*	Alumni Memorial Field; Lexington, VA	W 33–0	5,215	
September 10	1:00 p.m.	at No. 11 William & Mary*	Zable Stadium; Williamsburg, VA (rivalry)	L 7–41	7,140	
September 17	1:00 p.m.	at Duke*	Wallace Wade Stadium; Durham, NC	L 14–40	10,126	
September 24		No. 13 Lehigh*^{†}	Alumni Memorial Field; Lexington, VA	L 26–28	6,524	
October 1	12:00 p.m.	at Liberty	Williams Stadium; Lynchburg, VA	W 10–7	11,263	
October 8	1:00 p.m.	Charleston Southern	Alumni Memorial Field; Lexington, VA	W 34–12	6,844	
October 15	1:30 p.m.	at Wofford*	Gibbs Stadium; Spartanburg, SC	L 23–38	5,111	
October 22	12:00 p.m.	Gardner–Webb	Alumni Memorial Field; Lexington, VA	L 52–55 ^{3OT}	5,845	
October 29	12:30 p.m.	at No. 13 Coastal Carolina	Brooks Stadium; Conway, SC	L 14–38	7,218	
November 5	3:00 p.m.	at No. 23 Richmond*	University of Richmond Stadium; Richmond, VA	L 3–38	9,853	
November 19	1:00 p.m.	The Citadel*	Alumni Memorial Field; Lexington, VA (Military Classic of the South)	L 14–22	8,674	
*Non-conference game; ^{†}Homecoming; Rankings from The Sports Network Poll released prior to the game; All times are in Eastern time
