= 2005 The Citadel Bulldogs football team =

American college football season

2005 The Citadel Bulldogs football
- Conference: Southern Conference
- Record: 4–7 (2–5 SoCon)
- Head coach: Kevin Higgins (1st season)
- Offensive scheme: Triple option
- Defensive coordinator: Dick Hopkins (2nd season)
- Base defense: 4–3
- Home stadium: Johnson Hagood Stadium

2005 Southern Conference football standings
	Conf.			Overall
Team	W		L	W		L
No. 1 Appalachian State $^	6	–	1	12	–	3
No. 3 Furman ^	5	–	2	11	–	3
No. 9 Georgia Southern ^	5	–	2	8	–	4
Western Carolina	4	–	3	5	–	4
Wofford	3	–	4	6	–	5
Chattanooga	3	–	4	6	–	5
The Citadel	2	–	5	4	–	7
Elon	0	–	7	3	–	8
$ – Conference champion; ^ – NCAA Division I-AA playoff participant; Rankings from The Sports Network I-AA Poll

The 2005 The Citadel Bulldogs football team represented The Citadel, The Military College of South Carolina in the 2005 NCAA Division I-AA football season. Kevin Higgins served as head coach for the first season. The Bulldogs played as members of the Southern Conference and played home games at Johnson Hagood Stadium.

== Schedule ==
Date	Time	Opponent	Site	TV	Result	Attendance	Source
September 3	7:00 pm	Charleston Southern*	Johnson Hagood Stadium; Charleston, SC	SCETV	W 28–14	10,316	
September 10	6:45 pm	at No. 11 (I-A) Florida State*	Doak Campbell Stadium; Tallahassee, FL	ESPNU	L 10–62	79,152	
September 24	4:00 pm	No. 22 Appalachian State	Johnson Hagood Stadium; Charleston, SC		L 13–45	11,103	
October 1	6:00 pm	at No. 18 Western Carolina	E. J. Whitmire Stadium; Cullowhee, NC		W 17–7	10,067	
October 8	2:00 pm	at Ole Miss*	Vaught–Hemingway Stadium; Oxford, MS		L 7–27	50,272	
October 15	2:00 pm	No. 5 Furman	Johnson Hagood Stadium; Charleston, SC (rivalry)	SCETV	L 31–39 ^{3OT}	12,880	
October 22	3:30 pm	at No. 24 Georgia Southern	Paulson Stadium; Statesboro, GA	CSS	L 14–49	17,292	
October 29	4:00 pm	Wofford	Johnson Hagood Stadium; Charleston, SC (rivalry)	SCETV	L 10–28	11,290	
November 5	2:00 pm	at Chattanooga	Finley Stadium; Chattanooga, TN		L 21–31	6,005	
November 12	2:00 pm	Elon^{†}	Johnson Hagood Stadium; Charleston, SC		W 21–0	12,780	
November 19	1:00 pm	at VMI*	Alumni Memorial Field; Lexington, VA (Military Classic of the South)		W 22–14	8,674	
*Non-conference game; ^{†}Homecoming; Rankings from The Sports Network Poll released prior to the game; All times are in Eastern time

== NFL draft ==
Year	Round	Pick	Overall	Name	Team	Position
2005	7	8	222	Nehemiah Broughton	Washington Redskins	RB
