= 2005 Charleston Southern Buccaneers football team =

American college football season

2005 Charleston Southern Buccaneers football

Big South co-champion
- Conference: Big South Conference
- Record: 7–4 (3–1 Big South)
- Head coach: Jay Mills (3rd season)
- Offensive coordinator: Jamey Chadwell (2nd season)
- Defensive coordinator: Steve Barrows (3rd season)
- Home stadium: Buccaneer Field

2005 Big South Conference football standings
	Conf.			Overall
Team	W		L	W		L
No. 24 Coastal Carolina +	3	–	1	9	–	2
Charleston Southern +	3	–	1	7	–	4
Gardner–Webb	2	–	2	5	–	6
VMI	2	–	2	3	–	8
Liberty	0	–	4	1	–	10
+ – Conference co-champions; Rankings from The Sports Network poll

The 2005 Charleston Southern Buccaneers football team represented Charleston Southern University as a member of the Big South Conference during the 2005 NCAA Division I-AA football season. Led by third-year head coach Jay Mills, the Buccaneers compiled an overall record of 7–4 with a mark of 3–1 in conference play, winning a share of the Big South championship.

== Schedule ==
Date	Time	Opponent	Site	TV	Result	Attendance	Source
September 3	7:00 pm	at The Citadel*	Johnson Hagood Stadium; Charleston, SC	SCETV	L 14–28	10,316	
September 10	1:30 pm	Presbyterian*	Buccaneer Field; Charleston, SC		L 0–42	1,421	
September 17	1:30 pm	Jacksonville*	Buccaneer Field; Charleston, SC		W 16–10	971	
September 24	1:30 pm	at North Greenville*	Younts Stadium; Tigerville, SC		W 35–28	3,476	
October 1	1:30 pm	Howard*	Buccaneer Field; Charleston, SC		L 22–27	1,312	
October 8	1:00 pm	at VMI	Alumni Memorial Field; Lexington, VA		L 12–34	6,844	
October 15	1:30 pm	West Virginia Wesleyan*	Buccaneer Field; Charleston, SC		W 63–42	1,012	
October 22	1:30 pm	Savannah State*^{†}	Buccaneer Field; Charleston, SC		W 48–28	2,134	
November 5	1:30 pm	at Gardner–Webb	Ernest W. Spangler Stadium; Boiling Springs, NC		W 38–7	3,800	
November 12	1:30 pm	Liberty	Buccaneer Field; Charleston, SC		W 31–30	2,312	
November 19	12:30 pm	No. 9 Coastal Carolina	Buccaneer Field; Charleston, SC		W 34–27 ^{2OT}	3,781	
*Non-conference game; ^{†}Homecoming; Rankings from The Sports Network Poll released prior to the game; All times are in Eastern time
