= Donald Hill-Eley =

American football coach and player (born 1969)

Donald Hill–Eley
Current position
- Title: Chief of Staff
- Team: Georgia Tech
- Conference: ACC

Biographical details
- Born: July 29, 1969 (age 57)

Playing career
- 1987–1990: Virginia Union

Coaching career (HC unless noted)
- 1991: Virginia Union (assistant)
- 1992–1993: Hampton (GA)
- 1994–1995: Baltimore Stallions (WR)
- 1996: Toronto Argonauts (guest)
- 1997–2000: Hampton (OC)
- 2001: Morgan State (OC)
- 2002–2013: Morgan State
- 2014: Norfolk State (WR)
- 2015–2017: Alabama State (TE/ST)
- 2017: Alabama State (interim HC)
- 2018–2021: Alabama State
- 2022 (first 6 games): Georgia Tech (offensive analyst)
- 2022: Georgia Tech (RB)
- 2023–present: Georgia Tech (Chief of Staff)

Head coaching record
- Overall: 80–96

Accomplishments and honors

Awards
- MEAC Coach of the Year (2002)

Donald Hill–Eley (born July 29, 1969) is an American football coach and former player. He was previously the head football coach at Alabama State University. A graduate of Virginia Union University, Hill-Eley's coaching career has spanned three decades, includes stints in the Canadian Football League (CFL) and as head football coach at Morgan State University from 2002 to 2013.

== Coaching career ==
Hill-Eley was the running backs coach at Georgia Tech in 2022, being promoted mid-season after serving as an offensive analyst for the first half of the season.

== Personal life ==
His son, Ayinde Eley, is a football player.

== Head coaching record ==
Year	Team	Overall	Conference	Standing	Bowl/playoffs
Morgan State Bears (Mid-Eastern Athletic Conference) (2002–2013)
2002	Morgan State	7–5	5–3	T–2nd	
2003	Morgan State	6–5	4–3	5th	
2004	Morgan State	6–5	4–4	T–4th	
2005	Morgan State	2–9	1–6	T–5th	
2006	Morgan State	5–6	4–4	T–5th	
2007	Morgan State	5–6	4–5	6th	
2008	Morgan State	6–6	4–4	6th	
2009	Morgan State	6–5	4–4	T–4th	
2010	Morgan State	4–7	3–5	T–3rd	
2011	Morgan State	5–6	4–4	T–6th	
2012	Morgan State	3–8	2–6	T–9th	
2013	Morgan State	5–7	5–3	T–3rd	
Morgan State:		60–75	44–51		
Alabama State Hornets (Southwestern Athletic Conference) (2017–2021)
2017	Alabama State	5–1 (Note: Brian Jenkins was fired after the first five games of the 2017 season, during which Alabama State lost all five games including two conference games. Hill-Eley replaced Jenkins as interim head coach for the final six games of the season. The Hornets finished the season 5–6 overall and 4–3 in Southwestern Athletic Conference play.)	4–1	2nd (East)	
2018	Alabama State	4–7	3–4	4th (East)	
2019	Alabama State	5–6	4–3	T–2nd (East)	
2020–21	Alabama State	3–3	3–2	T–2nd (East)	
2021	Alabama State	3–4	2–3		
Alabama State:		20–21	16–13		
Total:		80–96			
