= 2005 Hampton Pirates football team =

American college football season

2005 Hampton Pirates football

Black college national champion MEAC champion

NCAA Division I-AA First Round, L 10–38 vs. Richmond
- Conference: Mid-Eastern Athletic Conference

Ranking
- Sports Network: No. 10
- Record: 11–1 (9–0 MEAC)
- Head coach: Joe Taylor (14th season)
- Offensive coordinator: Fred Kaiss (5th season)
- Home stadium: Armstrong Stadium

2005 Mid-Eastern Athletic Conference football standings
	Conf.			Overall
Team	W		L	W		L
No. 10 Hampton $^	8	–	0	11	–	1
No. 20 South Carolina State	7	–	1	9	–	2
Delaware State	6	–	2	7	–	4
Florida A&M	5	–	3	6	–	5
Bethune–Cookman	4	–	4	7	–	4
Norfolk State	2	–	6	4	–	7
North Carolina A&T	2	–	6	3	–	8
Howard	1	–	7	4	–	7
Morgan State	1	–	7	2	–	9
$ – Conference champion; ^ – NCAA Division I-AA playoff participant; Rankings from The Sports Network poll

The 2005 Hampton Pirates football team represented Hampton University as a member of the Mid-Eastern Athletic Conference (MEAC) during the 2005 NCAA Division I-AA football season. Led by 14th-year head coach Joe Taylor, the Pirates compiled an overall record of 11–1, with a mark of 9–0 in conference play, and finished as MEAC champion. Hampton finished their season with a loss against Richmond in the Division I-AA playoffs. At the conclusion of the season, the Pirates were also recognized as black college national champion.

== Schedule ==
Date	Time	Opponent	Rank	Site	TV	Result	Attendance	Source
September 3	1:00 p.m.	vs. Jackson State*	No. 13	Ford Field; Detroit, MI (Detroit Labor Day Classic)		W 20–7	25,737	
September 10	1:00 p.m.	at Howard	No. 13	William H. Greene Stadium; Washington, DC (rivalry)		W 22–12	10,500	
September 15	7:30 p.m.	at North Carolina A&T	No. 13	Aggie Stadium; Greensboro, NC		W 31–14	14,831	
September 24	4:00 p.m.	vs. Morgan State	No. 11	Giants Stadium; East Rutherford, NJ (Urban League Classic)		W 44–14	42,738	
October 1	6:00 p.m.	Delaware State	No. 9	Armstrong Stadium; Hampton, VA		W 26–8	10,130	
October 8	6:00 p.m.	at Gardner–Webb*	No. 8	Ernest W. Spangler Stadium; Boiling Springs, NC		W 52–21	2,750	
October 15	7:00 p.m.	at Norfolk State	No. 7	William "Dick" Price Stadium; Norfolk, VA (rivalry)		W 55–14	21,151	
October 22	2:00 p.m.	No. 19 South Carolina State	No. 4	Armstrong Stadium; Hampton, VA		W 14–10	16,306	
November 5	4:00 p.m.	at Bethune–Cookman	No. 3	Daytona Stadium; Daytona Beach, FL		W 24–10	8,954	
November 12	1:00 p.m.	Florida A&M	No. 2	Armstrong Stadium; Hampton, VA		W 34–14	7,013	
November 19	1:00 p.m.	Savannah State*	No. 2	Armstrong Stadium; Hampton, VA		W 44–6	1,917	
November 26	8:00 p.m.	No. 12 Richmond*	No. 2	Armstrong Stadium; Hampton, VA (NCAA Division I-AA First Round)	ESPNU	L 10–38	5,343	
*Non-conference game; Rankings from The Sports Network Poll released prior to the game; All times are in Eastern time
