= 2005 South Carolina State Bulldogs football team =

American college football season

2005 South Carolina State Bulldogs football
- Conference: Mid-Eastern Athletic Conference

Ranking
- Sports Network: No. 20
- Record: 9–2 (7–1 MEAC)
- Head coach: Oliver Pough (4th season)
- Home stadium: Oliver C. Dawson Stadium

2005 Mid-Eastern Athletic Conference football standings
	Conf.			Overall
Team	W		L	W		L
No. 10 Hampton $^	8	–	0	11	–	1
No. 20 South Carolina State	7	–	1	9	–	2
Delaware State	6	–	2	7	–	4
Florida A&M	5	–	3	6	–	5
Bethune–Cookman	4	–	4	7	–	4
Norfolk State	2	–	6	4	–	7
North Carolina A&T	2	–	6	3	–	8
Howard	1	–	7	4	–	7
Morgan State	1	–	7	2	–	9
$ – Conference champion; ^ – NCAA Division I-AA playoff participant; Rankings from The Sports Network poll

The 2005 South Carolina State Bulldogs football team represented South Carolina State University as a member of the Mid-Eastern Athletic Conference (MEAC) during the 2005 NCAA Division I-AA football season. Led by fourth-year head coach Oliver Pough, the Bulldogs compiled an overall record of 9–2, with a mark of 7–1 in conference play, and finished second in the MEAC.

== Schedule ==
Date	Opponent	Rank	Site	TV	Result	Attendance	Source
September 3	vs. Alabama State*		Legion Field; Birmingham, AL (MEAC/SWAC Challenge)	ESPN2	W 27–14	18,452	
September 10	Winston-Salem State*		Oliver C. Dawson Stadium; Orangeburg, SC		W 52–12	8,163	
September 17	vs. Bethune–Cookman		Alltel Stadium; Jacksonville, FL (Gateway Classic)		W 27–24	18,648	
October 1	Coastal Carolina*	No. 20	Oliver C. Dawson Stadium; Orangeburg, SC		L 23–24	18,902	
October 6	at Norfolk State	No. 24	William "Dick" Price Stadium; Norfolk, VA		W 35–21		
October 15	Florida A&M	No. 21	Oliver C. Dawson Stadium; Orangeburg, SC		W 49–3	13,020	
October 22	at No. 4 Hampton	No. 19	Armstrong Stadium; Hampton, VA		L 10–14	16,306	
October 29	Delaware State	No. 23	Oliver C. Dawson Stadium; Orangeburg, SC		W 24–3	20,050	
November 5	at Howard	No. 20	William H. Greene Stadium; Washington, DC		W 23–9		
November 10	Morgan State	No. 17	Oliver C. Dawson Stadium; Orangeburg, SC		W 65–15	10,993	
November 19	vs. North Carolina A&T	No. 16	American Legion Memorial Stadium; Charlotte, NC (rivalry)		W 43–27	14,375	
*Non-conference game; Rankings from The Sports Network Poll released prior to the game
