= Pete Adrian =

American football coach (born 1948)

Biographical details
- Born: August 11, 1948 (age 78); Brilliant, Ohio, U.S.

Coaching career (HC unless noted)
- 1970–1971: Rhode Island (assistant)
- 1972–1975: Idaho State (assistant)
- 1976–1980: Rhode Island (DC/LB)
- 1981–1985: Rhode Island (AHC/DC)
- 1986–1992: Bloomsburg
- 1993–1996: Deltona HS (FL)
- 1997–2000: Bethune–Cookman (DC)
- 2001: Chicago Enforcers (DC)
- 2002–2004: Bethune–Cookman (DC)
- 2005–2014: Norfolk State

Head coaching record
- Overall: 91–96–1 (college)
- Tournaments: 0–1 (NCAA D-I playoffs)

Accomplishments and honors

Championships
- 1 MEAC (2011)

Awards
- 2× MEAC Coach of the Year (2007, 2011)

Pete Adrian (born August 11, 1948) is an American former football coach. He served as the head football coach at Bloomsburg University from 1986 to 1992 and at Norfolk State University (NSU) from 2005 to 2014. Adrian was an assistant coach at Bethune–Cookman University, the University of West Virginia, Idaho State University, and the University of Rhode Island.

== Head coaching record ==
=== College ===
Year	Team	Overall	Conference	Standing	Bowl/playoffs	Sports Network^{#}	USA/ESPN^{°}
Bloomsburg Huskies (Pennsylvania State Athletic Conference) (1986–1992)
1986	Bloomsburg	7–2–1	3–2–1	T–3rd (East)			
1987	Bloomsburg	8–3	4–2	T–2nd (East)			
1988	Bloomsburg	7–4	4–2	3rd (East)			
1989	Bloomsburg	4–7	2–4	T–5th (East)			
1990	Bloomsburg	4–7	3–2	T–2nd (East)			
1991	Bloomsburg	5–5	4–2	T–2nd (East)			
1992	Bloomsburg	2–8	1–5	6th (East)			
Blooomsburg:		37–36–1	21–19–1				
Norfolk State Spartans (Mid-Eastern Athletic Conference) (2005–2014)
2005	Norfolk State	4–7	2–6	7th			
2006	Norfolk State	4–7	1–7	8th			
2007	Norfolk State	8–3	6–2	T–2nd			
2008	Norfolk State	5–7	3–5	7th			
2009	Norfolk State	7–4	5–3	3rd			
2010	Norfolk State	6–5	4–4	5th			
2011	Norfolk State	9–3	7–1	1st	L NCAA Division I First Round	19	22
2012	Norfolk State	4–7	2–6	9th			
2013	Norfolk State	3–9	3–5	9th			
2014	Norfolk State	4–8	4–4	6th			
Norfolk State:		54–60	37–43				
Total:		91–96–1					
National championship Conference title Conference division title or championship game berth
