= 2005 Chattanooga Mocs football team =

American college football season

2005 Chattanooga Mocs football
- Conference: Southern Conference
- Record: 6–5 (3–4 SoCon)
- Head coach: Rodney Allison (3rd season)
- Offensive coordinator: Jason Simpson (3rd season)
- Defensive coordinator: Billy Taylor (1st season)
- Home stadium: Finley Stadium

2005 Southern Conference football standings
	Conf.			Overall
Team	W		L	W		L
No. 1 Appalachian State $^	6	–	1	12	–	3
No. 3 Furman ^	5	–	2	11	–	3
No. 9 Georgia Southern ^	5	–	2	8	–	4
Western Carolina	4	–	3	5	–	4
Wofford	3	–	4	6	–	5
Chattanooga	3	–	4	6	–	5
The Citadel	2	–	5	4	–	7
Elon	0	–	7	3	–	8
$ – Conference champion; ^ – NCAA Division I-AA playoff participant; Rankings from The Sports Network I-AA Poll

The 2005 Chattanooga Mocs football team represented the University of Tennessee at Chattanooga as a member of the Southern Conference (SoCon) in the 2005 NCAA Division I-AA football season. The Mocs were led by third-year head coach Rodney Allison and played their home games at Finley Stadium. They finished the season 6–5 overall and 3–4 in SoCon play to tie for fifth place.

== Schedule ==
Date	Time	Opponent	Site	TV	Result	Attendance	Source
September 3	6:00 p.m.	Tennessee Tech*	Finley Stadium; Chattanooga, TN		W 30–23 ^{OT}	6,003	
September 10	7:00 p.m.	at Jacksonville State*	Paul Snow Memorial Stadium; Jacksonville, AL		W 21–18	12,862	
September 17	8:00 p.m.	at Memphis*	Liberty Bowl Memorial Stadium; Memphis, TN		L 14–59	30,772	
September 24	7:00 p.m.	at Georgia Southern	Paulson Stadium; Statesboro, GA		L 10–48	15,330	
October 1	4:00 p.m.	No. 22 Wofford^{†}	Finley Stadium; Chattanooga, TN		W 25–13	7,046	
October 8	7:00 p.m.	at Liberty*	Williams Stadium; Lynchburg, VA		W 24–21	3,683	
October 15	6:00 p.m.	at Elon	Rhodes Stadium; Elon, NC		W 10–7	3,118	
October 22	6:00 p.m.	Western Carolina	Finley Stadium; Chattanooga, TN		L 20–38	6,012	
October 29	3:30 p.m.	at No. 6 Appalachian State	Kidd Brewer Stadium; Boone, NC	CSS	L 25–35	22,338	
November 5	2:00 p.m.	The Citadel	Finley Stadium; Chattanooga, TN		W 31–21	6,005	
November 19	3:30 p.m.	Furman	Finley Stadium; Chattanooga, TN		L 35–56	5,548	
*Non-conference game; ^{†}Homecoming; Rankings from The Sports Network Poll released prior to the game; All times are in Eastern time
