= Steve Patton =

American football player and coach (born 1953)

Biographical details
- Born: December 28, 1953 (age 72); Oneonta, Alabama, U.S.

Playing career
- 1973: Alabama
- 1974–1976: Furman
- Position: Defensive end

Coaching career (HC unless noted)
- 1978–1979: Furman (GA)
- 1982: Alabama Magic (AFA)
- 1983: Carolina Storm (AFA)
- 1985–1987: Mars Hill
- 1993: Charlotte Rage
- 1995–1996: North Greenville
- 1997–2010: Gardner–Webb

Head coaching record
- Overall: 117–89–1 (college)

Accomplishments and honors

Championships
- 1 AFA (1983); 1 SAC-8 (1985); 2 Big South (2002–2003)

Awards
- AFA Coach of the Year (1983); SAC-8 Coach of the Year (1985); Div II National Coach of Year (1985); 2x Big South Coach of the Year (2002–2003)

Steve Patton (born December 28, 1953) is an American former football coach He served as the head football coach at Mars Hill College—now known as Mars Hill University—from 1985 to 1986, at North Greenville University from 1995 to 1996, and at Gardner–Webb University from 1997 to 2010, compiling a career college football coaching record of 117–89–1.

== Playing career ==
Patton played football at the University of Alabama before transferring to Furman University where he also competed in tennis. He graduated from Furman in 1977.

== Coaching career ==
On December 3, 2010, Gardner–Webb announced it would not be renewing the contract of Patton or his staff.

== Head coaching record ==
=== College ===
Year	Team	Overall	Conference	Standing	Bowl/playoffs	NAIA/TSN^{#}
Mars Hill Lions (SAC-8) (1985–1986)
1985	Mars Hill	8–3	6–1	1st		11
1986	Mars Hill	7–3–1	4–3	T–3rd		15
1987	Mars Hill	3–8	1–6	8th		
Mars Hill:		18–14–1	11–10			
North Greenville Mounties (Mid-South Conference) (1995–1996)
1995	North Greenville	5–6	2–6	T–7th		
1996	North Greenville	7–3	4–3	T–3rd		
North Greenville:		12–9	6–9			
Gardner–Webb Runnin' Bulldogs (South Atlantic Conference) (1997–1999)
1997	Gardner–Webb	8–3	4–3	T–3rd		
1998	Gardner–Webb	6–5	4–3	T–3rd		
1999	Gardner–Webb	7–4	4–4	T–4th		
Gardner–Webb Runnin' Bulldogs (NCAA Division II Independent) (2000–2001)
2000	Gardner–Webb	7–4				
2001	Gardner–Webb	6–4				
Gardner–Webb Runnin' Bulldogs (Big South Conference) (2002–2010)
2002	Gardner–Webb	9–1	3–0	1st		22
2003	Gardner–Webb	8–4	4–0	1st		
2004	Gardner–Webb	5–6	2–2	3rd		
2005	Gardner–Webb	5–6	2–2	3rd		
2006	Gardner–Webb	6–5	2–2	3rd		
2007	Gardner–Webb	5–6	2–2	3rd		
2008	Gardner–Webb	5–6	2–3	4th		
2009	Gardner–Webb	6–5	3–3	T–4th		
2010	Gardner–Webb	4–7	2–4	T–4th		
Gardner–Webb:		87–66	34–28			
Total:		117–89–1				
National championship Conference title Conference division title or championship game berth
^{#}NAIA Division I poll for Mars Hill and The Sports Network poll for Gardner–Webb.
