= 2005 Liberty Flames football team =

American college football season

2005 Liberty Flames football
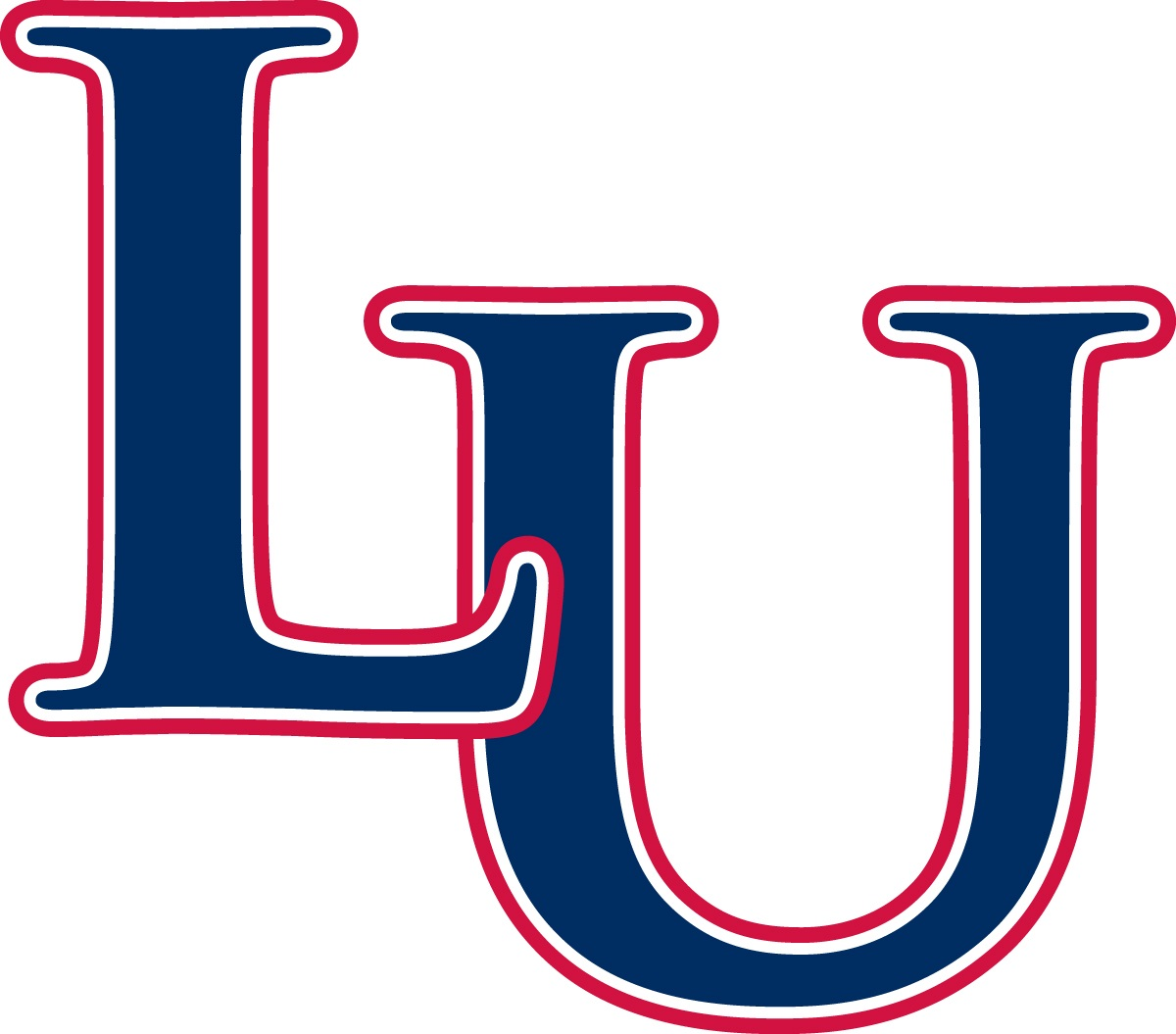
- Conference: Big South Conference
- Record: 1–10 (0–4 Big South)
- Head coach: Ken Karcher (6th season)
- Home stadium: Williams Stadium

2005 Big South Conference football standings
| | Conf. | | | Overall |
| Team | W | | L | W | | L |
|---|---|---|---|---|---|---|
| No. 24 Coastal Carolina + | 3 | – | 1 | 9 | – | 2 |
| Charleston Southern + | 3 | – | 1 | 7 | – | 4 |
| Gardner–Webb | 2 | – | 2 | 5 | – | 6 |
| VMI | 2 | – | 2 | 3 | – | 8 |
| Liberty | 0 | – | 4 | 1 | – | 10 |
+ – Conference co-champions; Rankings from The Sports Network poll

The 2005 Liberty Flames football team represented Liberty University a member of the Big South Conference during the 2005 NCAA Division I-AA football season. Led by sixth-year head coach Ken Karcher, the Flames compiled an overall record of 1–10 with a mark of 0–4 in conference play, placing last in the Big South. Liberty played home games at Williams Stadium in Lynchburg, Virginia.

Until the 2025 season; this was the most recent losing season for the Liberty Flames football team.

== Schedule ==
| Date | Time | Opponent | Site | Result | Attendance | Source |
|---|---|---|---|---|---|---|
| September 3 | 7:00 pm | Concord* | Williams Stadium; Lynchburg, VA | W 17–6 | 8,239 | |
| September 10 | 1:00 pm | at Connecticut* | Rentschler Field; East Hartford, CT | L 0–59 | 40,000 | |
| September 17 | 7:00 pm | Youngstown State* | Williams Stadium; Lynchburg, VA | L 0–42 | 5,479 | |
| September 24 | 1:00 pm | at No. 16 William & Mary* | Zable Stadium; Williamsburg, VA | L 0–56 | 11,741 | |
| October 1 | 12:00 pm | VMI^{†} | Williams Stadium; Lynchburg, VA | L 7–10 | 11,263 | |
| October 8 | 7:00 pm | Chattanooga* | Williams Stadium; Lynchburg, VA | L 21–24 | 3,683 | |
| October 15 | 7:00 pm | Towson* | Williams Stadium; Lynchburg, VA | L 17–38 | 3,033 | |
| October 22 | 7:00 pm | No. 14 Coastal Carolina | Williams Stadium; Lynchburg, VA (rivalry) | L 21–27 ^{3OT} | 2,815 | |
| October 29 | 6:00 pm | at Gardner–Webb | Ernest W. Spangler Stadium; Boiling Springs, NC | L 16–21 | 2,100 | |
| November 12 | 1:30 pm | at Charleston Southern | Buccaneer Field; Charleston, SC | L 30–31 | 2,312 | |
| November 19 | 1:00 pm | at Norfolk State* | William "Dick" Price Stadium; Norfolk, VA | L 17–34 | 4,062 | |
*Non-conference game; ^{†}Homecoming; Rankings from The Sports Network Poll released prior to the game; All times are in Eastern time
