= 2005 Howard Bison football team =

American college football season

2005 Howard Bison football
- Conference: Mid-Eastern Athletic Conference
- Record: 4–7 (1–7 MEAC)
- Head coach: Rayford Petty (4th season)
- Home stadium: William H. Greene Stadium

2005 Mid-Eastern Athletic Conference football standings
	Conf.			Overall
Team	W		L	W		L
No. 10 Hampton $^	8	–	0	11	–	1
No. 20 South Carolina State	7	–	1	9	–	2
Delaware State	6	–	2	7	–	4
Florida A&M	5	–	3	6	–	5
Bethune–Cookman	4	–	4	7	–	4
Norfolk State	2	–	6	4	–	7
North Carolina A&T	2	–	6	3	–	8
Howard	1	–	7	4	–	7
Morgan State	1	–	7	2	–	9
$ – Conference champion; ^ – NCAA Division I-AA playoff participant; Rankings from The Sports Network poll

The 2005 Howard Bison football team represented Howard University as a member of the Mid-Eastern Athletic Conference (MEAC) during the 2005 NCAA Division I-AA football season. Led by fourth-year head coach Rayford Petty, the Bison compiled an overall record of 4–7, with a conference record of 1–7, and finished tied for eighth in the MEAC.

== Schedule ==
Date	Opponent	Site	Result	Attendance	Source
September3	Winston-Salem State*	William H. Greene Stadium; Washington, DC	W 20–6		
September 10	No. 13 Hampton	William H. Greene Stadium; Washington, DC (rivalry)	L 12–22	10,500	
September 17	at Florida A&M	Bragg Memorial Stadium; Tallahassee, FL	L 20–33	9,701	
September 24	at Savannah State*	Ted Wright Stadium; Savannah, GA	W 39–21		
October 1	at Charleston Southern*	Buccaneer Field; North Charleston, SC	W 27–22	1,312	
October 15	at Morgan State	Hughes Stadium; Baltimore, MD (rivalry)	L 0–7	14,005	
October 22	North Carolina A&T	William H. Greene Stadium; Washington, DC	W 16–0	10,508	
October 29	at Norfolk State	William "Dick" Price Stadium; Norfolk, VA	L 7–26		
November 5	No. 20 South Carolina State	William H. Greene Stadium; Washington, DC	L 9–23		
November 12	Bethune–Cookman	William H. Greene Stadium; Washington, DC	L 16–45		
November 19	at Delaware State	Alumni Stadium; Dover, DE	L 7–23	2,315	
*Non-conference game; Rankings from The Sports Network Poll released prior to the game
