= 2005 Gardner–Webb Runnin' Bulldogs football team =

American college football season

2005 Gardner–Webb Runnin' Bulldogs football
- Conference: Big South Conference
- Record: 5–6 (2–2 Big South)
- Head coach: Steve Patton (9th season)
- Home stadium: Ernest W. Spangler Stadium

2005 Big South Conference football standings
	Conf.			Overall
Team	W		L	W		L
No. 24 Coastal Carolina +	3	–	1	9	–	2
Charleston Southern +	3	–	1	7	–	4
Gardner–Webb	2	–	2	5	–	6
VMI	2	–	2	3	–	8
Liberty	0	–	4	1	–	10
+ – Conference co-champions; Rankings from The Sports Network poll

The 2005 Gardner–Webb Runnin' Bulldogs football team represented Gardner–Webb University as a member of the Big South Conference during the 2005 NCAA Division I FCS football season. Led by Steve Patton in his ninth-year as head coach, the Runnin' Bulldogs compiled an overall record of 5–6 with a mark of 2–2 in conference play, tying for third place in the Big South. Gardner–Webb played home games at Ernest W. Spangler Stadium in Boiling Springs, North Carolina.

== Schedule ==
Date	Time	Opponent	Site	Result	Attendance	Source
September 3		Union (KY)*	Ernest W. Spangler Stadium; Boiling Springs, NC	W 65–12		
September 10		Belhaven*	Ernest W. Spangler Stadium; Boiling Springs, NC	W 54–7		
September 24	1:30 pm	Tennessee–Martin*	Ernest W. Spangler Stadium; Boiling Springs, NC	L 28–31	2,600	
October 1	2:00 pm	at No. 7 Furman*	Paladin Stadium; Greenville, SC	L 31–48	10,127	
October 8	6:00 pm	No. 8 Hampton*	Ernest W. Spangler Stadium; Boiling Springs, NC	L 21–52	2,750	
October 15	3:30 pm	at No. 15 Coastal Carolina	Brooks Stadium; Conway, SC	L 31–34 ^{OT}	6,024	
October 22	12:00 pm	at VMI	Alumni Memorial Field; Lexington, VA	W 55–52 ^{3OT}	5,845	
October 29	6:00 pm	Liberty	Ernest W. Spangler Stadium; Boiling Springs, NC	W 21–16	2,100	
November 5	1:30 pm	Charleston Southern	Ernest W. Spangler Stadium; Boiling Springs, NC	L 7–38	3,800	
November 12		at Savannah State*	Ted Wright Stadium; Savannah, GA	W 31–21		
November 19	12:00 pm	Wofford*	Ernest W. Spangler Stadium; Boiling Springs, NC	L 42–56	2,500	
*Non-conference game; Rankings from The Sports Network Poll released prior to the game; All times are in Eastern time
