= 2005 Western Carolina Catamounts football team =

American college football season

2005 Western Carolina Catamounts football
- Conference: Southern Conference
- Record: 5–4 (4–3 SoCon)
- Head coach: Kent Briggs (4th season)
- Defensive coordinator: Geoff Collins (4th season)
- Home stadium: Bob Waters Field at E. J. Whitmire Stadium

2005 Southern Conference football standings
	Conf.			Overall
Team	W		L	W		L
No. 1 Appalachian State $^	6	–	1	12	–	3
No. 3 Furman ^	5	–	2	11	–	3
No. 9 Georgia Southern ^	5	–	2	8	–	4
Western Carolina	4	–	3	5	–	4
Wofford	3	–	4	6	–	5
Chattanooga	3	–	4	6	–	5
The Citadel	2	–	5	4	–	7
Elon	0	–	7	3	–	8
$ – Conference champion; ^ – NCAA Division I-AA playoff participant; Rankings from The Sports Network I-AA Poll

The 2005 Western Carolina Catamounts team represented Western Carolina University as a member of the Southern Conference (SoCon) in the 2005 NCAA Division I-AA football season. The Catamounts were led by fourth-year head coach Kent Briggs and played their home games at Bob Waters Field at E. J. Whitmire Stadium. They finished the season 5–4 and 4–3 in SoCon play to place fourth.

== Schedule ==
Date	Opponent	Site	Result	Attendance	Source
September 1	Mars Hill*	Bob Waters Field at E. J. Whitmire Stadium; Cullowhee, NC	W 21–7	7,425	
September 10	No. 2 Furman	Bob Waters Field at E. J. Whitmire Stadium; Cullowhee, NC	W 41–21	9,847	
September 17	at Cincinnati*	Nippert Stadium; Cincinnati, OH	L 3–7	22,637	
September 24	at Nicholls State*	John L. Guidry Stadium; Thibodaux, LA	Cancelled (Note: The Catamounts game against Nicholls State was cancelled due to the impacts of Hurricane Rita.)	N/A	
October 1	The Citadel	Bob Waters Field at E. J. Whitmire Stadium; Cullowhee, NC	L 7–17	10,067	
October 8	Georgia Southern	Paulson Stadium; Statesboro, GA	L 7–45	14,156	
October 22	at Chattanooga	Finley Stadium; Chattanooga, TN	W 38–20	6,012	
October 29	Elon^{†}	Bob Waters Field at E. J. Whitmire Stadium; Cullowhee, NC	W 31–26	10,137	
November 5	Wofford	Bob Waters Field at E. J. Whitmire Stadium; Cullowhee, NC	W 24–0	8,021	
November 12	at No. 8 Appalachian State	Kidd Brewer Stadium; Boone, NC (rivalry)	L 7–35	25,584	
*Non-conference game; ^{†}Homecoming; Rankings from The Sports Network Poll released prior to the game
