= 2005 Coastal Carolina Chanticleers football team =

American college football season

2005 Coastal Carolina Chanticleers football

Big South co-champion
- Conference: Big South Conference

Ranking
- Sports Network: No. 24
- Record: 9–2 (3–1 Big South)
- Head coach: David Bennett (3rd season)
- Offensive coordinator: Jamie Snider (3rd season)
- Offensive scheme: Multiple
- Defensive coordinator: Curtis Walker (3rd season)
- Base defense: 4–3
- Home stadium: Brooks Stadium

2005 Big South Conference football standings
	Conf.			Overall
Team	W		L	W		L
No. 24 Coastal Carolina +	3	–	1	9	–	2
Charleston Southern +	3	–	1	7	–	4
Gardner–Webb	2	–	2	5	–	6
VMI	2	–	2	3	–	8
Liberty	0	–	4	1	–	10
+ – Conference co-champions; Rankings from The Sports Network poll

The 2005 Coastal Carolina Chanticleers football team represented Coastal Carolina University as a member of the Big South Conference during the 2005 NCAA Division I-AA football season. Led by third-year head coach David Bennett, the Chanticleers compiled an overall record of 9–2 with a mark of 3–1 in conference play, sharing the Big South title with Charleston Southern. Coastal Carolina played home games at Brooks Stadium in Conway, South Carolina.

== Schedule ==
Date	Time	Opponent	Rank	Site	Result	Attendance	Source
September 3	6:00 p.m.	at Elon*		Rhodes Stadium; Elon, NC	W 17–10	7,462	
September 10	7:00 p.m.	No. 1 James Madison*		Brooks Stadium; Conway, SC	W 31–27	8,533	
September 17	3:30 p.m.	at Appalachian State*	No. 17	Kidd Brewer Stadium; Boone, NC	L 3–30	23,267	
September 24	7:00 p.m.	Delaware State*		Brooks Stadium; Conway, SC	W 24–6	8,267	
October 1	2:00 p.m.	at No. 20 South Carolina State*		Oliver C. Dawson Stadium; Orangeburg, SC	W 24–23	18,902	
October 15	3:30 p.m.	Gardner–Webb	No. 15	Brooks Stadium; Conway, SC	W 34–31 ^{OT}	6,024	
October 22	7:00 p.m.	at Liberty	No. 14	Williams Stadium; Lynchburg, VA (rivalry)	W 27–21 ^{3OT}	2,815	
October 29	12:30 p.m.	VMI	No. 13	Brooks Stadium; Conway, SC	W 38–14	7,218	
November 5	1:30 p.m.	at Savannah State*	No. 9	Ted Wright Stadium; Savannah, GA	W 42–16	3,237	
November 12	12:30 p.m.	Mansfield*	No. 9	Brooks Stadium; Conway, SC	W 71–8	6,592	
November 19	12:30 p.m.	at Charleston Southern	No. 9	Buccaneer Field; North Charleston, SC	L 27–34 ^{2OT}	3,781	
*Non-conference game; Rankings from The Sports Network Poll released prior to the game; All times are in Eastern time
