= 2005 Georgia Southern Eagles football team =

American college football season

2005 Georgia Southern Eagles football

NCAA Division I-AA First Round, L 35–50 vs. Texas State
- Conference: Southern Conference

Ranking
- Sports Network: No. 9
- Record: 8–4 (5–2 SoCon)
- Head coach: Mike Sewak (4th season)
- Offensive coordinator: Mitch Ware (4th season)
- Defensive coordinator: Joe Tresey (2nd season)
- Home stadium: Paulson Stadium (Capacity: 18,000)

2005 Southern Conference football standings
	Conf.			Overall
Team	W		L	W		L
No. 1 Appalachian State $^	6	–	1	12	–	3
No. 3 Furman ^	5	–	2	11	–	3
No. 9 Georgia Southern ^	5	–	2	8	–	4
Western Carolina	4	–	3	5	–	4
Wofford	3	–	4	6	–	5
Chattanooga	3	–	4	6	–	5
The Citadel	2	–	5	4	–	7
Elon	0	–	7	3	–	8
$ – Conference champion; ^ – NCAA Division I-AA playoff participant; Rankings from The Sports Network poll

The 2005 Georgia Southern Eagles football team represented the Georgia Southern Eagles of Georgia Southern University during the 2005 NCAA Division I-AA football season. The Eagles played their home games at Paulson Stadium in Statesboro, Georgia. The team was coached by Mike Sewak, in his fourth and final year as head coach for the Eagles.

== Schedule ==
Date	Time	Opponent	Rank	Site	TV	Result	Attendance	Source
September 3	2:00 pm	at Northeastern*	No. 6	Parsons Field; Boston, MA		W 41–38 ^{OT}	5,354	
September 10	6:00 pm	McNeese State*	No. 5	Paulson Stadium; Statesboro, GA		L 20–23	20,607	
September 17	7:00 pm	at Wofford	No. 14	Gibbs Stadium; Spartanburg, SC		L 26–27	29,303	
September 24	7:00 pm	Chattanooga		Paulson Stadium; Statesboro, GA		W 48–10	15,330	
October 1	7:00 pm	at Elon		Rhodes Stadium; Elon, NC		W 49–7	9,875	
October 8	12:00 pm	Western Carolina	No. 21	Paulson Stadium; Statesboro, GA		W 45–7	14,156	
October 15	3:30 pm	at No. 19 Appalachian State	No. 16	Kidd Brewer Stadium; Boone, NC (rivalry)	FSNS	L 7–24	21,486	
October 22	3:30 pm	The Citadel	No. 24	Paulson Stadium; Statesboro, GA	CSS	W 49–14	17,292	
October 29	2:00 pm	at South Dakota State*	No. 19	Coughlin–Alumni Stadium; Brookings, SD		W 55–42	4,128	
November 5	5:00 pm	No. 1 Furman	No. 14	Paulson Stadium; Statesboro, GA		W 27–24	19,808	
November 12	1:00 pm	Morehead State*	No. 10	Paulson Stadium; Statesboro, GA		W 63–17	10,250	
November 26	3:30 pm	at No. 4 Texas State*	No. 6	Bobcat Stadium; San Marcos, TX (NCAA Division I-AA First Round)	ESPN2	L 35–50	10,000	
*Non-conference game; Rankings from The Sports Network Poll released prior to the game; All times are in Eastern time
