= 2005 Florida A&M Rattlers football team =

American college football season

2005 Florida A&M Rattlers football
- Conference: Mid-Eastern Athletic Conference
- Record: 6–5 (5–3 MEAC)
- Head coach: Rubin Carter (1st season)
- Home stadium: Bragg Memorial Stadium

2005 Mid-Eastern Athletic Conference football standings
	Conf.			Overall
Team	W		L	W		L
No. 10 Hampton $^	8	–	0	11	–	1
No. 20 South Carolina State	7	–	1	9	–	2
Delaware State	6	–	2	7	–	4
Florida A&M	5	–	3	6	–	5
Bethune–Cookman	4	–	4	7	–	4
Norfolk State	2	–	6	4	–	7
North Carolina A&T	2	–	6	3	–	8
Howard	1	–	7	4	–	7
Morgan State	1	–	7	2	–	9
$ – Conference champion; ^ – NCAA Division I-AA playoff participant; Rankings from The Sports Network poll

The 2005 Florida A&M Rattlers football team represented Florida A&M University as a member of the Mid-Eastern Athletic Conference (MEAC) during the 2005 NCAA Division I-AA football season. Led by first-year head coach Rubin Carter, the Rattlers compiled an overall record of 6–5, with a mark of 5–3 in conference play, and finished fourth in the MEAC.

== Schedule ==
Date	Opponent	Site	Result	Attendance	Source
September 3	Delaware State	Bragg Memorial Stadium; Tallahassee, FL	L 17–21	13,814	
September 10	at South Florida*	Raymond James Stadium; Tampa, FL	L 3–37	43,122	
September 17	Howard	Bragg Memorial Stadium; Tallahassee, FL	W 33–20	9,701	
September 24	vs. Tennessee State*	Georgia Dome; Atlanta, GA (Atlanta Football Classic)	W 12–7	56,297	
October 1	at FIU*	FIU Stadium; Miami, FL	L 6–23	16,512	
October 15	at No. 21 South Carolina State	Oliver C. Dawson Stadium; Orangeburg, SC	L 3–49	13,020	
October 22	Norfolk State	Bragg Memorial Stadium; Tallahassee, FL	W 31–17	26,988	
October 29	at Morgan State	Hughes Stadium; Baltimore, MD	W 27–16	3,429	
November 5	North Carolina A&T	Bragg Memorial Stadium; Tallahassee, FL	W 24–14	10,242	
November 12	at No. 2 Hampton	Armstrong Stadium; Hampton, VA	L 14–34	7,013	
November 19	vs. Bethune–Cookman	Florida Citrus Bowl; Orlando, FL (Florida Classic)	W 26–23 ^{OT}	70,112	
*Non-conference game; Rankings from The Sports Network Poll released prior to the game
