= 2005 Morgan State Bears football team =

American college football season

2005 Morgan State Bears football
- Conference: Mid-Eastern Athletic Conference
- Record: 2–9 (1–7 MEAC)
- Head coach: Donald Hill-Eley (4th season)
- Home stadium: Hughes Stadium

2005 Mid-Eastern Athletic Conference football standings
	Conf.			Overall
Team	W		L	W		L
No. 10 Hampton $^	8	–	0	11	–	1
No. 20 South Carolina State	7	–	1	9	–	2
Delaware State	6	–	2	7	–	4
Florida A&M	5	–	3	6	–	5
Bethune–Cookman	4	–	4	7	–	4
Norfolk State	2	–	6	4	–	7
North Carolina A&T	2	–	6	3	–	8
Howard	1	–	7	4	–	7
Morgan State	1	–	7	2	–	9
$ – Conference champion; ^ – NCAA Division I-AA playoff participant; Rankings from The Sports Network poll

The 2005 Morgan State Bears football team represented Morgan State University as a member of the Mid-Eastern Athletic Conference (MEAC) during the 2005 NCAA Division I-AA football season. Led by fourth-year head coach Donald Hill-Eley, the Bears compiled an overall record of 2–9, with a mark of 1–7 in conference play, and finished tied for eighth in the MEAC.

== Schedule ==
Date	Opponent	Site	Result	Attendance	Source
September 1	at Towson*	Johnny Unitas Stadium; Towson, MD (rivalry)	L 26–29	6,527	
September 10	Bowie State*	Hughes Stadium; Baltimore, MD	L 21–35	9,547	
September 17	vs. Savannah State*	Cleveland Browns Stadium; Cleveland, OH (Ohio Classic)	W 55–26	40,502	
September 24	vs. No. 11 Hampton	Giants Stadium; East Rutherford, NJ (Urban League Classic)	L 14–44	42,738	
October 1	at Bethune–Cookman	Municipal Stadium; Daytona Beach, FL	L 26–44	10,580	
October 8	vs. North Carolina A&T	FedExField; Landover, MD (Prince George's Classic)	L 33–40 ^{OT}	11,500	
October 15	Howard	Hughes Stadium; Baltimore, MD (rivalry)	W 7–0	14,005	
October 22	at Delaware State	Alumni Stadium; Dover, DE	L 14–41	2,841	
October 29	Florida A&M	Hughes Stadium; Baltimore, MD	L 16–27	3,429	
November 5	Norfolk State	Hughes Stadium; Baltimore, MD	L 21–24	3,672	
November 10	at No. 17 South Carolina State	Oliver C. Dawson Stadium; Orangeburg, SC	L 15–65	10,993	
*Non-conference game; Rankings from The Sports Network Poll released prior to the game
