= 2005 North Carolina A&T Aggies football team =

American college football season

2005 North Carolina A&T Aggies football
- Conference: Mid-Eastern Athletic Conference
- Record: 3–8 (2–6 MEAC)
- Head coach: George Small (3rd season)
- Home stadium: Aggie Stadium

2005 Mid-Eastern Athletic Conference football standings
	Conf.			Overall
Team	W		L	W		L
No. 10 Hampton $^	8	–	0	11	–	1
No. 20 South Carolina State	7	–	1	9	–	2
Delaware State	6	–	2	7	–	4
Florida A&M	5	–	3	6	–	5
Bethune–Cookman	4	–	4	7	–	4
Norfolk State	2	–	6	4	–	7
North Carolina A&T	2	–	6	3	–	8
Howard	1	–	7	4	–	7
Morgan State	1	–	7	2	–	9
$ – Conference champion; ^ – NCAA Division I-AA playoff participant; Rankings from The Sports Network poll

The 2005 North Carolina A&T Aggies football team represented North Carolina A&T State University as a member of the Mid-Eastern Athletic Conference (MEAC) during the 2005 NCAA Division I-AA football season. Led by third-year head coach George Small, the Aggies compiled an overall record of 3–8, with a mark of 2–6 in conference play, and finished tied for sixth in the MEAC.

== Schedule ==
Date	Opponent	Site	Result	Attendance	Source
September 5	vs. North Carolina Central*	Carter–Finley Stadium; Raleigh, NC (rivalry)	L 22–23	35,000	
September 10	Norfolk State	Aggie Stadium; Greensboro, NC	W 16–14	11,733	
September 15	No. 13 Hampton	Aggie Stadium; Greensboro, NC	L 14–31	14,831	
September 24	at Elon*	Rhodes Stadium; Elon, NC	L 9–12	9,250	
October 1	vs. Tennessee State*	RCA Dome; Indianapolis, IN (Circle City Classic)	W 16–3	42,310	
October 8	vs. Morgan State	FedExField; Landover, MD (Prince George's Classic)	W 40–33 ^{OT}	11,500	
October 15	Delaware State	Aggie Stadium; Greensboro, NC	L 13–23	22,137	
October 22	at Howard	William H. Greene Stadium; Washington, DC	L 0–16	10,508	
October 29	Bethune–Cookman	Aggie Stadium; Greensboro, NC	L 17–54		
November 5	at Florida A&M	Bragg Memorial Stadium; Tallahassee, FL	L 14–24	10,242	
November 19	vs. No. 16 South Carolina State	American Legion Memorial Stadium; Charlotte, NC (rivalry)	L 27–43	14,375	
*Non-conference game; Rankings from The Sports Network Poll released prior to the game
