= 2005 Norfolk State Spartans football team =

American college football season

2005 Norfolk State Spartans football
- Conference: Mid-Eastern Athletic Conference
- Record: 4–7 (2–6 MEAC)
- Head coach: Pete Adrian (1st season)
- Home stadium: William "Dick" Price Stadium

2005 Mid-Eastern Athletic Conference football standings
	Conf.			Overall
Team	W		L	W		L
No. 10 Hampton $^	8	–	0	11	–	1
No. 20 South Carolina State	7	–	1	9	–	2
Delaware State	6	–	2	7	–	4
Florida A&M	5	–	3	6	–	5
Bethune–Cookman	4	–	4	7	–	4
Norfolk State	2	–	6	4	–	7
North Carolina A&T	2	–	6	3	–	8
Howard	1	–	7	4	–	7
Morgan State	1	–	7	2	–	9
$ – Conference champion; ^ – NCAA Division I-AA playoff participant; Rankings from The Sports Network poll

The 2005 Norfolk State Spartans football team represented Norfolk State University as a member of the Mid-Eastern Athletic Conference (MEAC) during the 2005 NCAA Division I-AA football season. Led by first-year head coach Pete Adrian, the Spartans compiled an overall record of 4–7, with a conference record of 2–6, and finished tied for sixth in the MEAC.

== Schedule ==
Date	Opponent	Site	Result	Attendance	Source
September 3	Virginia State*	William "Dick" Price Stadium; Norfolk, VA	L 6–34		
September 10	at North Carolina A&T	Aggie Stadium; Greensboro, NC	L 14–16	11,733	
September 24	Bethune–Cookman	William "Dick" Price Stadium; Norfolk, VA	L 61–63 ^{4OT}	7,428	
October 1	at Savannah State*	Ted Wright Stadium; Savannah, GA	W 58–29		
October 6	No. 24 South Carolina State	William "Dick" Price Stadium; Norfolk, VA	L 21–35		
October 15	No. 7 Hampton	William "Dick" Price Stadium; Norfolk, VA (rivalry)	L 14–55	21,151	
October 22	at Florida A&M	Bragg Memorial Stadium; Tallahassee, FL	L 17–31	26,988	
October 29	Howard	William "Dick" Price Stadium; Norfolk, VA	W 26–7		
November 5	at Morgan State	Hughes Stadium; Baltimore, MD	W 24–21	3,672	
November 12	at Delaware State	Alumni Stadium; Dover, DE	L 17–38	2,841	
November 19	Liberty*	William "Dick" Price Stadium; Norfolk, VA	W 34–17	4,062	
*Non-conference game; Rankings from The Sports Network Poll released prior to the game
