= Kentucky Wildcats football statistical leaders =

The Kentucky Wildcats football statistical leaders are individual statistical leaders of the Kentucky Wildcats football program in various categories, including passing, rushing, receiving, total offense, all-purpose yardage, defensive stats, kicking, and scoring. Within those areas, the lists identify single-game, single-season, and career leaders. The Wildcats represent the University of Kentucky (UK) in the NCAA Division I FBS Southeastern Conference.

Although Kentucky began competing in intercollegiate football in 1892, the school's official record book considers the "modern era" to have begun in 1946. Records from before this year are often incomplete and inconsistent, and they are generally not included in these lists. For example, Cecil Tuttle rushed for 6 touchdowns against Maryland in 1907, but complete records for the era are unavailable. Recent UK media guides include a dedicated page listing what the school calls "old-time records" from the pre-1946 era.

These lists are dominated by more recent players for several reasons:

- Since 1950, seasons have increased from 10 games to 11 and then 12 games in length.
- The NCAA didn't allow freshmen to play varsity football until 1972 (with the exception of the World War II years), allowing players to have four-year careers.
- Bowl games only began counting toward single-season and career statistics in 2002. The Wildcats have played in 12 bowl games since this decision, and will play in a 13th in 2023, giving many recent players an extra game to accumulate statistics.
- Due to COVID-19 issues, the NCAA ruled that the 2020 season would not count against the athletic eligibility of any football player, giving everyone who played in that season the opportunity for five years of eligibility instead of the normal four.
- From 2018 through 2025, players were allowed to participate in as many as four games in a redshirt season; previously, playing in even one game "burned" the redshirt. In 2024 and 2025, postseason games did not count against the four-game limit. These changes to redshirt rules have given very recent players several extra games to accumulate statistics.
- A more recent change that will have a major effect on future career leaderboards was introduced in 2026 with full implementation starting with the 2027 freshman class. Going forward, redshirting will be prohibited, but players will have five years of full athletic eligibility, provided that they are no older than 19 when they first enroll in a postsecondary institution. Players who had remaining eligibility under previous rules at the end of the 2025 season will benefit from the new rule.

These lists are updated through the end of the 2025 regular season. Players active in 2025 are indicated in bold.

== Passing ==
=== Passing yards ===
Career
Rank	Player	Yards	Years
1	Jared Lorenzen	10,354	2000 2001 2002 2003
2	Andre' Woodson	9,360	2004 2005 2006 2007
3	Tim Couch	8,435	1996 1997 1998
4	Mike Hartline	5,680	2007 2008 2009 2010
5	Bill Ransdell	5,564	1983 1984 1985 1986
6	Will Levis	5,232	2021 2022
7	Patrick Towles	5,099	2012 2014 2015
8	Rick Norton	4,514	1963 1964 1965
9	Babe Parilli	4,351	1949 1950 1951
10	Stephen Johnson	4,342	2016 2017

Single season
Rank	Player	Yards	Year
1	Tim Couch	4,275	1998
2	Tim Couch	3,884	1997
3	Andre' Woodson	3,709	2007
4	Jared Lorenzen	3,687	2000
5	Andre' Woodson	3,515	2006
6	Dusty Bonner	3,266	1999
7	Mike Hartline	3,178	2010
8	Will Levis	2,827	2021
9	Devin Leary	2,746	2023
10	Patrick Towles	2,718	2014

Single game
Rank	Player	Yards	Year	Opponent
1	Jared Lorenzen	528	2000	Georgia
2	Tim Couch	499	1998	Arkansas
3	Tim Couch	498	1998	Louisville
4	Tim Couch	492	1998	Vanderbilt
5	Tim Couch	476	1997	Tennessee
6	Jared Lorenzen	453	2001	Vanderbilt
7	Andre' Woodson	450	2006	Vanderbilt
8	Dusty Bonner	446	1999	Louisville
9	Andre' Woodson	430	2007	Tennessee
10	Tim Couch	428	1997	Northeast Louisiana

=== Passing touchdowns ===
Career
Rank	Player	TDs	Years
1	Andre' Woodson	79	2004 2005 2006 2007
2	Jared Lorenzen	78	2000 2001 2002 2003
3	Tim Couch	74	1996 1997 1998
4	Babe Parilli	50	1949 1950 1951
5	Will Levis	43	2021 2022
6	Mike Hartline	38	2007 2008 2009 2010
7	Rick Norton	26	1963 1964 1965
	Dusty Bonner	26	1997 1999
9	Devin Leary	25	2023
10	Randy Jenkins	24	1979 1980 1981 1982 1983
	Patrick Towles	24	2012 2014 2015

Single season
Rank	Player	TDs	Year
1	Andre' Woodson	40	2007
2	Tim Couch	37	1997
3	Tim Couch	36	1998
4	Andre' Woodson	31	2006
5	Dusty Bonner	26	1999
6	Devin Leary	25	2023
7	Jared Lorenzen	24	2002
	Will Levis	24	2021
9	Babe Parilli	23	1950
	Mike Hartline	23	2010

Single game
Rank	Player	TDs	Year	Opponent
1	Tim Couch	7	1997	Indiana
	Tim Couch	7	1998	Louisville
3	Tim Couch	6	1997	Northeast Louisiana
	Jared Lorenzen	6	2001	Vanderbilt
	Andre' Woodson	6	2007	Tennessee

== Rushing ==
=== Rushing yards ===
Career
Rank	Player	Yards	Years
1	Benny Snell	3,873	2016 2017 2018
2	Sonny Collins	3,835	1972 1973 1974 1975
3	Chris Rodriguez Jr.	3,644	2018 2019 2020 2021 2022
4	Moe Williams	3,333	1993 1994 1995
5	Rafael Little	2,996	2004 2005 2006 2007
6	Mark Higgs	2,892	1984 1985 1986 1987
7	George Adams	2,648	1981 1982 1983 1984
8	Derrick Locke	2,618	2007 2008 2009 2010
9	Boom Williams	2,511	2014 2015 2016
10	Artose Pinner	2,105	1999 2000 2001 2002

Single season
Rank	Player	Yards	Year
1	Moe Williams	1,600	1995
2	Lynn Bowden	1,468	2019
3	Benny Snell	1,449	2018
4	Artose Pinner	1,414	2002
5	Chris Rodriguez Jr.	1,379	2021
6	Benny Snell	1,333	2017
7	Mark Higgs	1,278	1987
8	Sonny Collins	1,213	1973
9	Boom Williams	1,170	2016
10	Sonny Collins	1,150	1975

Single game
Rank	Player	Yards	Year	Opponent
1	Moe Williams	299	1995	South Carolina
2	Lynn Bowden	284	2019	Louisville
3	**Ray Davis**	280	2023	Florida
4	Moe Williams	272	1995	Cincinnati
5	Ivy Joe Hunter	238	1986	Vanderbilt
	Moe Williams	238	1995	Mississippi State
7	Lynn Bowden	233	2019	Virginia Tech (Belk Bowl)
8	Sonny Collins	229	1973	Mississippi State
9	Artose Pinner	224	2002	Vanderbilt
10	Benny Snell	211	2017	Louisville

=== Rushing touchdowns ===
Career
Rank	Player	TDs	Years
1	Benny Snell	48	2016 2017 2018
2	Chris Rodriguez Jr.	33	2018 2019 2020 2021 2022
3	Sonny Collins	26	1972 1973 1974 1975
	Moe Williams	26	1993 1994 1995
5	Derrick Ramsey	25	1976 1977 1978
	George Adams	25	1981 1982 1983 1984
	Mark Higgs	25	1984 1985 1986 1987
8	Randall Cobb	22	2008 2009 2010
	Derrick Locke	22	2007 2008 2009 2010
10	Rodger Bird	21	1963 1964 1965

Single season
Rank	Player	TDs	Year
1	Benny Snell	19	2017
2	Moe Williams	17	1995
3	Benny Snell	16	2018
4	Ray Davis	14	2023
5	Sonny Collins	13	1973
	Derrick Ramsey	13	1977
	George Adams	13	1984
	Artose Pinner	13	2002
	Benny Snell	13	2016
	Lynn Bowden	13	2019

Single game
Rank	Player	TDs	Year	Opponent
1	Rodger Bird	4	1965	Vanderbilt
	Sonny Collins	4	1973	Mississippi State
	Moe Williams	4	1995	South Carolina
	Artose Pinner	4	2002	Vanderbilt
	Benny Snell	4	2016	New Mexico State
	Benny Snell	4	2018	Mississippi State
	Lynn Bowden	4	2019	Louisville
	Will Levis	4	2021	Louisville

== Receiving ==
=== Receptions ===
Career
Rank	Player	Rec	Years
1	Craig Yeast	208	1995 1996 1997 1998
2	Derek Abney	197	2000 2001 2002 2003
3	Anthony White	194	1996 1997 1998 1999
4	Keenan Burton	189	2003 2004 2005 2006 2007
5	Garrett Johnson	155	2014 2015 2016 2017
6	Randall Cobb	144	2008 2009 2010
7	Dicky Lyons Jr.	141	2004 2005 2006 2007 2008
8	La'Rod King	134	2009 2010 2011 2012
9	Jacob Tamme	133	2004 2005 2006 2007
10	Rafael Little	131	2004 2005 2006 2007
	Josh Ali	131	2017 2018 2019 2020 2021

Single season
Rank	Player	Rec	Year
1	Wan'Dale Robinson	104	2021
2	James Whalen	90	1999
3	Craig Yeast	85	1998
4	Randall Cobb	84	2010
5	Anthony White	78	1998
6	Keenan Burton	77	2006
7	Craig Yeast	73	1997
8	Lynn Bowden	67	2018
9	Derek Abney	66	2001
	Keenan Burton	66	2007

Single game
Rank	Player	Rec	Year	Opponent
1	Craig Yeast	16	1998	Vanderbilt
2	Randall Cobb	13	2010	Tennessee
	Matt Roark	13	2011	Mississippi State
	Lynn Bowden	13	2018	Missouri
	Wan'Dale Robinson	13	2021	Tennessee

=== Receiving yards ===
Career
Rank	Player	Yards	Years
1	Craig Yeast	2,899	1995 1996 1997 1998
2	Keenan Burton	2,376	2003 2004 2005 2006 2007
3	Derek Abney	2,339	2000 2001 2002 2003
4	Garrett Johnson	2,089	2014 2015 2016 2017
5	Dane Key	1,870	2022 2023 2024
6	Dicky Lyons Jr.	1,752	2004 2005 2006 2007 2008
7	Quentin McCord	1,743	1996 1998 1999 2000
8	La'Rod King	1,706	2009 2010 2011 2012
9	Randall Cobb	1,661	2008 2009 2010
10	Barion Brown	1,528	2022 2023 2024

Single season
Rank	Player	Yards	Year
1	Wan'Dale Robinson	1,334	2021
2	Craig Yeast	1,311	1998
3	Stevie Johnson	1,041	2007
4	Keenan Burton	1,036	2006
5	James Whalen	1,019	1999
6	Randall Cobb	1,017	2010
7	Chris Matthews	925	2010
8	Craig Yeast	873	1997
9	Dicky Lyons Jr.	822	2006
10	Quentin McCord	799	2000

Single game
Rank	Player	Yards	Year	Opponent
1	Craig Yeast	269	1998	Vanderbilt
2	Craig Yeast	206	1998	Florida
3	Rick Kestner	185	1964	Ole Miss
4	Wan'Dale Robinson	181	2021	New Mexico State
5	Chris Matthews	177	2010	South Carolina
6	Keenan Burton	171	2006	Vanderbilt
	Randall Cobb	171	2010	Mississippi State
8	Dee Smith	170	1987	Tennessee
	Wan'Dale Robinson	170	2021	Iowa (Citrus Bowl)
10	Larry Seiple	167	1965	Houston

=== Receiving touchdowns ===
Career
Rank	Player	TDs	Years
1	Craig Yeast	28	1995 1996 1997 1998
2	Keenan Burton	25	2003 2004 2005 2006 2007
3	Derek Abney	18	2000 2001 2002 2003
	Dicky Lyons Jr.	18	2004 2005 2006 2007 2008
5	La'Rod King	17	2009 2010 2011 2012
6	Aaron Boone	16	2001 2002
7	Quentin McCord	15	1996 1998 1999 2000
8	Stevie Johnson	14	2006 2007
	Dane Key	14	2022 2023 2024
10	Kevin Coleman	13	1995 1996 1997 1998
	James Whalen	13	1997 1998 1999
	Randall Cobb	13	2008 2009 2010

Single season
Rank	Player	TDs	Year
1	Craig Yeast	14	1998
2	Stevie Johnson	13	2007
3	Keenan Burton	12	2006
4	Craig Yeast	10	1997
	James Whalen	10	1999
	Aaron Boone	10	2002
	Randall Cobb	10	2009
8	Dicky Lyons Jr.	9	2006
	Keenan Burton	9	2007
	Chris Matthews	9	2010

Single game
Rank	Player	TDs	Year	Opponent
1	Al Bruno	4	1950	North Dakota
	Craig Yeast	4	1997	Indiana
	James Whalen	4	1999	Georgia

== Total offense ==
Total offense is the sum of passing and rushing statistics. It does not include receiving or returns.

=== Total offense yards ===
Career
Rank	Player	Yards	Years
1	Jared Lorenzen	10,637	2000 2001 2002 2003
2	Andre' Woodson	8,870	2004 2005 2006 2007
3	Tim Couch	8,160	1996 1997 1998
4	Mike Hartline	5,660	2007 2008 2009 2010
5	Will Levis	5,501	2021 2022
6	Bill Ransdell	5,456	1983 1984 1985 1986
7	Patrick Towles	5,454	2012 2014 2015
8	Stephen Johnson	5,044	2016 2017
9	Terry Wilson	4,451	2018 2019 2020
10	Pookie Jones	4,313	1991 1992 1993

Single season
Rank	Player	Yards	Year
1	Tim Couch	4,151	1998
2	Jared Lorenzen	3,827	2000
3	Tim Couch	3,759	1997
4	Andre' Woodson	3,516	2007
5	Andre' Woodson	3,378	2006
6	Will Levis	3,202	2021
7	Mike Hartline	3,143	2010
8	Dusty Bonner	3,125	1999
9	Jared Lorenzen	3,021	2002

Single game
Rank	Player	Yards	Year	Opponent
1	Jared Lorenzen	525	2000	Georgia

=== Touchdowns responsible for ===
"Touchdowns responsible for" is the NCAA's official term for combined passing and rushing touchdowns.

While many past UK football record books have listed leaders in this statistic, the 2023 record book does not list any leaders over any time frame.

Career
Rank	Player	TDs	Years
1	Jared Lorenzen	90	2000 2001 2002 2003
2	Andre' Woodson	84	2004 2005 2006 2007
3	Tim Couch	78	1996 1997 1998
4	Will Levis	54	2021 2022
5	Babe Parilli	50+	1949 1950 1951
6	Benny Snell	48	2016 2017 2018
7	Mike Hartline	39	2007 2008 2009 2010
	Derrick Ramsey	39	1975 1976 1977
8	Chris Rodriguez Jr.	36	2018 2019 2020 2021 2022
9	Patrick Towles	35	2012 2014 2015
10	Rick Norton	32	1963 1964 1965

Single season
Rank	Player	TDs	Year
1	Andre' Woodson	43	2007
2	Tim Couch	40	1997
3	Tim Couch	37	1998
4	Will Levis	33	2021
5	Andre' Woodson	32	2006
6	Dusty Bonner	29	1999
	Devin Leary	26	2023
8	Jared Lorenzen	24	2000
	Jared Lorenzen	24	2002
	Mike Hartline	24	2010

Single game
Rank	Player	TDs	Year	Opponent
1	Tim Couch	7	1997	Indiana
	Tim Couch	7	1998	Louisville

== All-purpose yardage ==
All-purpose yardage is the sum of all yards credited to a player who is in possession of the ball. It includes rushing, receiving, and returns, but does not include passing.

Kentucky did not list a record for single-game all-purpose yardage in its football media guide until the 2019 edition (only including the top two performances), and even then did not break down said performances by type of play, only listing the number of plays involved. While it fully lists career leaders, it only lists annual leaders and does not maintain a separate list of all-time season leaders. However, a review of the career statistics for players listed among all-time and annual leaders shows that no season produced two players who would have been in the top 10 for single-season all-purpose yardage.

Career
Rank	Player	Yards	Years
1	Derek Abney	5,856	2000 2001 2002 2003
2	Rafael Little	5,343	2004 2005 2006 2007
3	Derrick Locke	4,973	2007 2008 2009 2010
4	Randall Cobb	4,674	2008 2009 2010
5	Lynn Bowden	4,660	2017 2018 2019
6	Craig Yeast	4,280	1995 1996 1997 1998
7	Benny Snell	4,214	2016 2017 2018
8	Keenan Burton	4,206	2003 2004 2005 2006 2007
9	Sonny Collins	4,123	1972 1973 1974 1975
10	George Adams	4,080	1981 1982 1983 1984

Single season
Rank	Player	Yards	Year
1	Randall Cobb	2,396	2010
2	Lynn Bowden	2,069	2019
3	Rafael Little	1,982	2005
4	Derek Abney	1,922	2002
5	Keenan Burton	1,845	2006
6	Craig Yeast	1,841	1998
7	Derrick Locke	1,830	2009
8	Moe Williams	1,826	1995
9	Derek Abney	1,821	2003
10	Derek Abney	1,692	2001

Single game
Rank	Player	Yards	Year	Opponent
1	Moe Williams	429	1995	South Carolina
2	Rafael Little	372	2005	Vanderbilt
3	Ray Davis	289	2023	Florida
4	Lynn Bowden	284	2019	Louisville

== Defense ==
Note: The original source for this article, the 2014 Kentucky Football Media Guide, does not list a full top 10 in the defensive categories. No edition from 2017 forward lists a full top 10 in these categories.

=== Interceptions ===
Career
Rank	Player	Ints	Years
1	Darryl Bishop	14	1971 1972 1973
2	Wilbur Jamerson	11	1947 1948 1949 1950
	Tony Mayes	11	1983 1984 1985 1986
4	Buzz Burnam	10	1970 1971 1972
	Larry Carter	10	1977 1978 1979
	Marcus McClinton	10	2004 2005 2006 2007 2008

Single season
Rank	Player	Ints	Year
1	Jerry Claiborne	9	1949
2	Paul Calhoun	7	1984
3	Marcus Jenkins	6	1993
	Sam Maxwell	6	2009

Single game
Rank	Player	Ints	Year	Opponent
1	Clayton Webb	3	1948	Xavier
2	Bradley Mills	3	1952	Tulane
3	Terry Beadles	3	1965	Missouri
4	Greg Long	3	1981	North Texas
5	Marcus Jenkins	3	1993	Florida

=== Tackles ===
Career
Rank	Player	Tackles	Years
1	Jim Kovach	521	1974 1975 1976 1978
2	Chris Chenault	482	1985 1986 1987 1988
3	Jeff Kremer	475	1984 1985 1986 1987
4	Marty Moore	462	1990 1991 1992 1993

Single season
Rank	Player	Tackles	Year
1	Marty Moore	183	1991
2	Jeff Kremer	180	1987
3	Tom Ehlers	174	1974
	Randy Holleran	174	1990
5	Jim Kovach	164	1978

Single game
Rank	Player	Tackles	Year	Opponent
1	Randy Holleran	29	1990	LSU
2	Chris Chenault	28	1987	Vanderbilt
3	Jeff Kremer	25	1987	Georgia
4	Scott Schroeder	24	1982	Florida
	Chris Chenault	24	1988	Tennessee

=== Sacks ===
Career
Rank	Player	Sacks	Years
1	Josh Allen	31.5	2015 2016 2017 2018
2	Oliver Barnett	26.0	1986 1987 1988 1989
3	J.J. Weaver	22.0	2019 2020 2021 2022 2023 2024
4	Dennis Johnson	19.0	1998 1999 2000 2001
5	Jamar Watson	18.5	2017 2018 2019 2020
6	Jeremy Jarmon	17.5	2006 2007 2008
7	Dean Wells	17.0	1989 1990 1991 1992
	Chris Ward	17.0	1993 1994 1995 1996

Single season
Rank	Player	Sacks	Year
1	Josh Allen	17.0	2018
2	Dennis Johnson	12.0	2001
3	Chris Ward	10.5	1996
4	Dean Wells	10.0	1992
5	Oliver Barnett	9.0	1988
	Jeremy Jarmon	9.0	2007

Single game
Rank	Player	Sacks	Year	Opponent
1	Dean Wells	5.0	1992	Indiana
2	Dave Lyons	4.0	1982	Vanderbilt
	Kurt Supe	4.0	1995	Indiana

== Kicking ==
The original source for this page, the 2014 Kentucky Football Media Guide, only lists a top 5 in field goal kicking lists, rather than a top 10. Statistics from later seasons have been incorporated into the 2014 lists.

=== Field goals made ===
Career
Rank	Player	FGs	Years
1	Austin MacGinnis	72	2014 2015 2016 2017
2	Joey Worley	57	1984 1985 1986 1987
3	Lones Seiber	49	2006 2007 2008 2009
4	Matt Ruffolo	42	2019 2020 2021 2022
5	Taylor Begley	36	2002 2003 2004 2005
6	Seth Hanson	35	1997 1998 2000 2001
7	Doug Pelfrey	34	1990 1991 1992
8	Craig McIntosh	31	2009 2010 2011 2012

Single season
Rank	Player	FGs	Year
1	Austin MacGinnis	22	2017
2	Austin MacGinnis	21	2014
3	Joey Worley	19	1985
4	Joey Worley	17	1986
	Ken Willis	17	1989
6	Lones Seiber	16	2007
	Austin MacGinnis	16	2016
	Matt Ruffolo	16	2022

Single game
Rank	Player	FGs	Year	Opponent
1	Doug Pelfrey	5	1992	Mississippi State
2	Joey Worley	4	1985	Clemson
	Joey Worley	4	1985	Bowling Green
	Joey Worley	4	1986	Southern Mississippi
	Ken Willis	4	1989	Rutgers
	Austin MacGinnis	4	2014	Louisville
	Austin MacGinnis	4	2016	Mississippi State
	Austin MacGinnis	4	2017	Missouri
	Matt Ruffolo	4	2022	Louisville
	Alex Raynor	4	2024	Georgia

=== Field goal percentage ===
Career
Rank	Player	FG%	Years
1	Alex Raynor	93.8%	2023 2024
2	Joe Mansour	85.7%	2010 2011 2012 2013
3	Marc Samuel	82.4%	1997 1999
4	Austin MacGinnis	79.1%	2014 2015 2016 2017
5	Jacob Kauwe	76.5%	2025
6	Matt Ruffolo	75.0%	2019 2020 2021 2022
7	Seth Hanson	72.9%	1997 1998 2000 2001
8	Ken Willis	70.7%	1987 1988 1989
9	Craig McIntosh	70.5%	2009 2010 2011 2012

Single season
Rank	Player	FG%	Year
1	Alex Raynor	93.8%	2024
2	Alex Raynor	90.9%	2023
3	Seth Hanson	88.2%	2000
4	Craig McIntosh	85.7%	2011
	Joe Mansour	85.7%	2013
	Matt Ruffolo	85.7%	2020
7	Austin MacGinnis	84.2%	2016
8	Bob Jones	83.3%	1970
9	Marc Samuel	82.4%	1999

== Scoring ==
The 2019 media guide was the first to include a full top 10 for career points scored. Otherwise, UK continues to follow its recent practice of not listing a full top 10 in other scoring categories, instead listing anywhere from a top 3 to a top 5. Lists from the 2017 media guide have been updated to include statistics from subsequent seasons.

=== Points ===
Career
Rank	Player	Points	Years
1	Austin MacGinnis	359	2014 2015 2016 2017
2	Lones Seiber	305	2006 2007 2008 2009
3	Benny Snell	290	2016 2017 2018
4	Joey Worley	246	1984 1985 1986 1987
5	Matt Ruffolo	245	2019 2020 2021 2022
6	Seth Hanson	232	1997 1998 2000 2001
7	Taylor Begley	226	2002 2003 2004 2005
	Randall Cobb	226	2008 2009 2010
9	Chris Rodriguez Jr.	216	2018 2019 2020 2021 2022
10	Craig Yeast	192	1995 1996 1997 1998

Single season
Rank	Player	Points	Year
1	**Ray Davis**	126	2023
2	Benny Snell	116	2017
3	Austin MacGinnis	104	2014
4	Moe Williams	102	1995
	Austin MacGinnis	102	2017
6	Lones Seiber	99	2007

Single game
Rank	Player	Points	Year	Opponent
1	Calvin Bird	25	1958	Hawaii
2	Don Phelps	24	1946	Michigan State
	Al Bruno	24	1950	North Dakota
	Rodger Bird	24	1965	Vanderbilt
	Sonny Collins	24	1973	Mississippi State
	Moe Williams	24	1995	South Carolina
	Craig Yeast	24	1997	Indiana
	James Whalen	24	1999	Georgia
	Artose Pinner	24	2002	Vanderbilt
	Benny Snell	24	2016	New Mexico State
	Benny Snell	24	2018	Mississippi State
	Lynn Bowden	24	2019	Louisville
	Will Levis	24	2021	Louisville
	**Ray Davis**	24	2023	Florida

=== Touchdowns ===
In official NCAA statistics, touchdown totals include touchdowns scored. Accordingly, these lists include rushing, receiving, and return touchdowns, but not passing touchdowns.

Career
Rank	Player	TDs	Years
1	Benny Snell	48	2016 2017 2018
2	Randall Cobb	37	2008 2009 2010
3	Chris Rodriguez Jr.	36	2018 2019 2020 2021 2022
4	Craig Yeast	32	1995 1996 1997 1998
5	Rodger Bird	27	1963 1964 1965
	George Adams	27	1981 1982 1983 1984
	Moe Williams	27	1993 1994 1995
	Derrick Locke	27	2007 2008 2009 2010

Single season
Rank	Player	TDs	Year
1	**Ray Davis**	21	2023
2	Benny Snell	19	2017
3	Moe Williams	17	1995
4	Benny Snell	16	2018
5	Craig Yeast	15	1998
	Artose Pinner	15	2002
	Randall Cobb	15	2009

Single game
Rank	Player	TDs	Year	Opponent
1	Don Phelps	4	1946	Michigan State
	Al Bruno	4	1950	North Dakota
	Calvin Bird	4	1958	Hawaii
	Rodger Bird	4	1965	Vanderbilt
	Sonny Collins	4	1973	Mississippi State
	Moe Williams	4	1995	South Carolina
	Craig Yeast	4	1997	Indiana
	James Whalen	4	1999	Georgia
	Artose Pinner	4	2002	Vanderbilt
	Benny Snell	4	2016	New Mexico State
	Benny Snell	4	2018	Mississippi State
	Lynn Bowden	4	2019	Louisville
	Will Levis	4	2021	Louisville
	**Ray Davis**	4	2023	Florida
