= 2006 Kentucky Wildcats football team =

American college football season

2006 Kentucky Wildcats football

Music City Bowl champion

Music City Bowl, W 28–20 vs. Clemson
- Conference: Southeastern Conference
- Eastern Division
- Record: 8–5 (4–4 SEC)
- Head coach: Rich Brooks (4th season)
- Offensive coordinator: Joker Phillips (2nd season)
- Offensive scheme: Pro-style
- Defensive coordinator: Mike Archer (7th season)
- Base defense: 4–3
- Home stadium: Commonwealth Stadium

2006 Southeastern Conference football standings
	Conf.			Overall
Team	W		L	W		L
Eastern Division
No. 1 Florida x$#	7	–	1	13	–	1
No. 25 Tennessee	5	–	3	9	–	4
No. 23 Georgia	4	–	4	9	–	4
Kentucky	4	–	4	8	–	5
South Carolina	3	–	5	8	–	5
Vanderbilt	1	–	7	4	–	8
Western Division
No. 15 Arkansas x	7	–	1	10	–	4
No. 9 Auburn	6	–	2	11	–	2
No. 3 LSU %	6	–	2	11	–	2
Alabama	2	–	6	6	–	7
Ole Miss	2	–	6	4	–	8
Mississippi State	1	–	7	3	–	9
Championship: Florida 38, Arkansas 28
# – BCS National Champion; $ – BCS representative as conference champion; % – BCS at-large representative; x – Division champion/co-champions; Alabama had all victories vacated by the NCAA in 2010. As such, the official record for Alabama is 0–7 (0–6).; Rankings from AP Poll

The 2006 Kentucky Wildcats football team represented the University of Kentucky in the 2006 NCAA Division I FBS football season. They participated as members of the Southeastern Conference in the Eastern Division. They played their home games at Commonwealth Stadium in Lexington, Kentucky. The team was coached by Rich Brooks.

== Schedule ==
Date	Time	Opponent	Site	TV	Result	Attendance
September 3	8:00 pm	at No. 13 Louisville*	Papa John's Cardinal Stadium; Louisville, KY (Governor's Cup)	ESPN	L 28–59	42,597
September 9	6:00 pm	No. 22 (FCS) Texas State*	Commonwealth Stadium; Lexington, KY		W 41–7	57,136
September 16	6:00 pm	Ole Miss	Commonwealth Stadium; Lexington, KY	PPV	W 31–14	60,338
September 23	7:45 pm	at No. 5 Florida	Ben Hill Griffin Stadium; Gainesville, FL (rivalry)	ESPN	L 7–26	90,292
September 30	6:00 pm	Central Michigan*	Commonwealth Stadium; Lexington, KY		W 45–36	54,566
October 7	7:00 pm	South Carolina	Commonwealth Stadium; Lexington, KY	ESPN2	L 17–24	61,449
October 14	8:00 pm	at No. 14 LSU	Tiger Stadium; Baton Rouge, LA	PPV	L 0–49	92,148
October 28	2:30 pm	at Mississippi State	Davis Wade Stadium; Starkville, MS		W 34–31	37,834
November 4	1:00 pm	Georgia^{†}	Commonwealth Stadium; Lexington, KY		W 24–20	62,120
November 11	1:00 pm	Vanderbilt	Commonwealth Stadium; Lexington, KY (rivalry)		W 38–26	52,235
November 18	1:00 pm	Louisiana–Monroe*	Commonwealth Stadium; Lexington, KY		W 42–40	53,463
November 25	12:30 pm	at No. 19 Tennessee	Neyland Stadium; Knoxville, TN (rivalry)	LFS	L 12–17	104,382
December 29	1:00 pm	vs. Clemson*	The Coliseum; Nashville, TN (Music City Bowl)	ESPN	W 28–20	68,024
*Non-conference game; ^{†}Homecoming; Rankings from AP Poll released prior to the game; All times are in Eastern time

== Roster ==
2006 Kentucky Wildcats football team roster
Players
Coaches
Offense

Pos.	#	Name	Class
[[American football positions|]]
[[American football positions|]]

Defense

Pos.	#	Name	Class
[[American football positions|]]

Special teams

Pos.	#	Name	Class

}}

Head coach

- [[]]

Coordinators/assistant coaches

Legend

- (C) Team captain
- (S) Suspended
- (I) Ineligible
- Injured
- Redshirt

== Commits ==
Player	Hometown	Position	Weight	Height
Micah Johnson	Fort Campbell, KY	Linebacker	-	-
Ashton Cobb	Monaca, PA	Safety	195	6'0
Jo'Dane Craigman	Ukiah, CA	EDGE	245	6'4
Will Fidler	Henderson, KY	QB	205	6'5
Chris Goode	Atlanta, GA	TE	225	6'4
Corey Goodson	Chatham, VA	RB	210	6'2
AJ Grigsby	Torrance, CA	CB	190	6'0
Calvin Harrison	Columbia, SC	Safety	190	6'1
Ricky Lumpkin	Clarksville, TN	EDGE	255	6'4
Josh Minton	Somerset, KY	EDGE	240	6'3
Jamil Paris	Sebastian, FL	EDGE	215	6'5
Corey Peters	Louisville, KY	DL	305	6'3
Lones Seiber	Knoxville, TN	Kicker	165	5'9
Darrell Stevens	Tampa, FL	WR	170	6'0
Moncell Allen	Baton Rouge, LA	RB	215	5'9

== Statistics ==
Passing
Number	Name	Position	Year	Games played	Completions	Attempts	Completion %	Yards	Touchdowns	Interceptions
3	Andre Woodson	QB	JR	13	264	419	63.0%	3515	31	7
15	Curtis Pulley	QB	SO	13	8	14	57.1%	72	0	0
44	Tim Masthay	P	SO	13	1	1	100%	10	0	0
83	Michael Strickland	WR	FR	5	0	1	0%	0	0	0

Rushing
Number	Name	Position	Year	Games played	Attempts	Yards	Average	Touchdowns
2	Antoine Brown	RB	FR	3	5	4	0.8	0
3	Andre Woodson	QB	JR	13	70	-137	-2.0	1
4	Micah Johnson	LB	FR	13	2	1	0.5	1
7	David Jones	DB/WR	SO	12	4	17	4.3	0
15	Curtis Pulley	QB	SO	13	23	124	5.4	0
19	Keenan Burton	WR	JR	13	1	-7	-7.0	0
22	Rafael Little	RB	JR	9	140	673	4.8	3
24	Terrell Bankhead	RB	SR	13	8	47	5.9	0
28	Tony Dixon	RB	SO	12	87	303	3.5	0
29	Alfonso Smith	RB	FR	13	60	250	4.2	2
36	Lones Seiber	K	FR	10	1	-2	-2.0	0
38	John Conner	RB	FR	12	2	5	2.5	0
40	Maurice Grinter	RB/TE	FR	8	1	1	1.0	1
44	Tim Masthay	P	SO	13	1	17	17.0	0

Receiving
Number	Name	Position	Year	Games played	Receptions	Yards	Average	Touchdowns
2	Marcus McClinton	DB	SO	13	1	10	10.0	0
7	David Jones	DB/WR	SO	12	7	101	14.4	0
8	Demoreo Ford	WR	SO	13	11	179	16.3	2
12	Dicky Lyons	WR	SO	13	50	822	16.4	9
13	Steve Johnson	WR	JR	13	12	159	13.3	3
15	Curtis Pulley	QB	SO	13	21	201	9.6	1
18	Jacob Tamme	WR/TE	JR	13	32	386	12.1	2
19	Keenan Burton	WR	JR	13	77	1036	13.2	12
22	Rafael Little	RB	JR	9	31	392	12.6	2
24	Terrell Bankhead	RB	SR	13	1	4	4.0	0
28	Tony Dixon	RB	SO	12	17	138	8.1	0
29	Alfonso Smith	RB	FR	13	6	96	16.0	0
38	John Conner	RB	FR	12	2	21	10.5	1
40	Maurice Grinter	RB/TE	FR	8	3	18	6.0	2
83	Michael Strickland	WR	FR	5	1	26	26.0	0
89	Sean Murphy	WR	JR	13	1	8	8.0	0

Defense
Number	Name	Position	Year	Games played	Tackles	Tackles for loss	Sacks	Interceptions	Passes defended	Forced fumbles	Fumbles recovered
2	Marcus McClinton	DB	SO	13	65	1.0	0.0	4	0	0	0
3	Andre Woodson	QB	JR	13	1	0.0	0.0	0	0	0	0
4	Micah Johnson	LB	FR	13	29	0.0	0.0	0	0	0	0
7	David Jones	DB/WR	SO	12	12	0.0	0.0	0	0	0	0
9	Durrell White	LB/DL	JR	12	45	5.5	2.0	0	0	0	0
10	Karl Booker	DB	SR	13	44	0.0	0.0	1	0	0	0
11	Ben McGrath	LB	SO	10	13	0.0	0.5	0	1	0	0
14	Dallas Greer	DB	JR	1	1	0.0	0.0	0	0	0	0
16	Wesley Woodyard	LB	JR	13	122	9.5	2.0	1	0	0	0
17	EJ Adams	DB/WR	FR	8	13	0.0	0.0	1	0	0	0
19	Keenan Burton	WR	JR	13	1	0.0	0.0	0	0	0	0
20	Dominic Lewis	RB/DL	JR	12	30	6.5	2.0	0	1	0	0
21	Michael Schwindel	DB/LB	FR	8	1	0.0	0.0	0	0	0	0
22	Rafael Little	RB	JR	9	1	0.0	0.0	0	0	0	0
23	Shomari Moore	DB	SO	11	20	1.0	1.0	1	0	0	0
24	Terrell Bankhead	RB	SR	13	1	0.0	0.0	0	0	0	0
27	Ashton Cobb	DB	FR	11	11	1.0	0.0	0	0	1	0
29	Alfonso Smith	RB	FR	13	3	0.0	0.0	0	0	0	0
32	Trevard Lindley	DB	FR	13	52	0.0	0.0	2	0	0	0
33	Calvin Harrison	DB	FR	8	7	0.0	0.0	0	0	0	0
34	Paul Warford	DB	FR	12	34	1.0	1.0	0	1	2	0
35	Roger Williams	DB	JR	13	62	4.0	1.0	2	0	0	0
38	John Connor	RB	FR	12	1	0.0	0.0	0	0	0	0
39	Adam Richey	DB	SO	10	8	0.0	0.0	0	0	0	0
45	Lamar Mills	DL	SR	12	28	3.0	1.0	0	1	0	0
46	Joe Schuler	LB	JR	7	12	1.0	0.0	0	0	0	0
47	AJ. Nance	LB/RB	FR	9	4	0.0	0.0	0	0	0	0
47	Matt Ramsey	RB	FR	2	2	0.0	0.0	0	0	0	0
48	Terry Clayton	LB	JR	2	1	0.0	0.0	0	0	0	0
50	Sam Maxwell	LB	FR	10	6	0.0	0.0	0	0	0	0
51	Johnny Williams	LB	SO	12	35	2.0	0.0	1	0	0	0
56	Braxton Kelley	LB	SO	13	82	4.5	1.0	0	1	1	0
57	Hayden Lane	OL	SR	7	1	0.0	0.0	0	0	0	0
63	Rickey Abren	DL	JR	9	6	1.0	1.0	0	0	0	0
66	Jason Leger	DL	JR	8	3	1.0	0.0	0	0	0	0
72	Michael Aitcheson	OL	SR	10	1	0.0	0.0	0	0	0	0
73	Jason Dickerson	OL	SR	11	2	0.0	0.0	0	0	0	0
76	Justin Jefferies	OL	FR	8	2	0.0	0.0	0	0	0	0
80	T.C. Drake	TE	FR	8	1	0.0	0.0	0	0	0	0
90	Jamil Paris	DL	FR	8	4	0.5	0.5	0	0	0	0
91	Corey Peters	DL	FR	10	18	2.0	1.0	0	1	0	0
93	Austin Moss	DL	FR	3	1	1.0	1.0	0	0	0	0
94	Travis Day	DL	JR	3	5	0.5	0.0	0	0	0	0
95	Ventrell Jenkins	DL	SO	11	11	4.5	1.0	0	0	0	0
96	J.D. Craigman	DL	JR	9	3	1.5	1.5	0	5	0	1
97	Nii Adjei Oninku	DL	SO	11	12	0.5	0.0	0	0	0	0
98	Myron Pryor	DL	SO	12	42	6.5	5.0	1	0	0	0
99	Jeremy Jarmon	DL	FR	13	30	6.0	4.0	0	3	1	0

Kicking
Number	Name	Position	Year	Games played	Extra Points made	Extra Points attempted	Extra Point %	Field goals made	Field goals attempted	Field Goal %
5	JJ. Housley	K	SO	2	7	8	87.5%	0	1	0.0%
6	Brian Scott	K	JR	3	2	2	100%	0	0	0.0%
36	Lones Seiber	K	FR	10	33	34	97.1%	11	19	57.9%

Punting
Number	Name	Position	Year	Games played	Punts	Yards	Average
4	Kris Kessler	P	SR	7	3	116	38.7
44	Tim Masthay	P	SO	13	50	1959	39.2

== Team awards ==
Most Valuable Player: Andre Woodson, QB

Most Outstanding Offensive Player: Keenan Burton, WR

Most Outstanding Defensive Player: Wesley Woodyard, LB

Most Inspirational Player: Michael Aitcheson, OL

Most Improved Players: Dicky Lyons, WR and Durrell White, DL

Outstanding First-Year Players: Alfonso Smith, RB and Trevard Lindley, DB

Special Teams Player of the Year: Jason Dickerson, LS

Most Outstanding Offensive Lineman: Garry Williams, OL

Jerry Claiborne Award (academics/team attitude): Hayden Lane, OL

Most Valuable Scout Team Players: Robbie McAtee, WR and Austin Moss, DT
