= Tim Masthay =

American football player (born 1987)

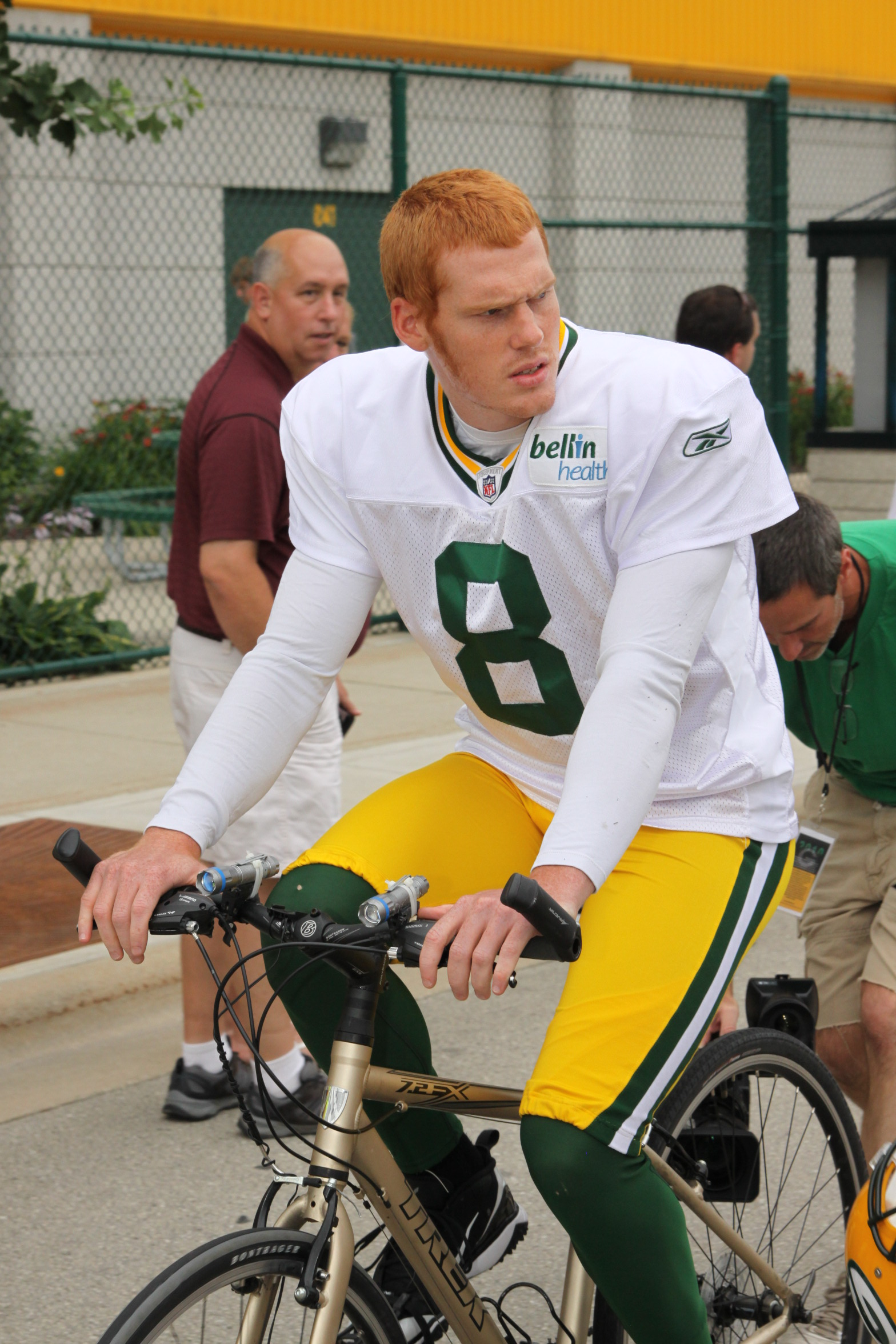
- Masthay with the Packers in 2011

No. 8,7
- Position: Punter

Personal information
- Born: March 16, 1987 (age 39); Pittsburgh, Pennsylvania, U.S.
- Listed height: 6 ft 1 in (1.85 m)
- Listed weight: 200 lb (91 kg)

Career information
- High school: Murray (KY)
- College: Kentucky (2005–2008)
- NFL draft: 2009: undrafted

Career history
- Indianapolis Colts (2009)*; Green Bay Packers (2010–2015)
- * Offseason or practice squad member only

Awards and highlights
- Super Bowl champion (XLV); First-team All-SEC (2008)

Career NFL statistics
- Punts: 390
- Punting yards: 17,230
- Average punt: 44.2
- Inside 20: 132
- Stats at Pro Football Reference

Timothy James Masthay (born March 16, 1987) is an American former professional football player who was a punter for the Green Bay Packers of the National Football League (NFL). He played college football for the Kentucky Wildcats. Masthay was signed by the Indianapolis Colts as an undrafted free agent in 2009. He later won Super Bowl XLV with the Packers over his hometown team, the Pittsburgh Steelers. Masthay was nicknamed "Ginger Wolverine" by his Packers teammates for his long red sideburns.

== Early life ==
Tim was born to Mark Masthay, who currently serves as the chairman of the chemistry department at the University of Dayton and to Jean Masthay, currently Executive Director of PregnancyCare in Cincinnati, Ohio, and brother of Ted Masthay. Masthay played youth soccer in Des Moines for the Johnston Hornets. Masthay played both football and soccer, as well as baseball and basketball at Murray High School in Murray, Kentucky. His positions on the school's football team included punter, placekicker, kick returner, wide receiver, and special teams coach. In the off seasons, he, along with Thomas Morstead, Pat McAfee, T. J. Conley, and Dan Bailey are currently instructors for Kohl's Kicking Camps, a training camp from high school upwards especially for kickers, punters and long snappers.

== College career ==
Masthay played college football for the Kentucky Wildcats football team from 2005 to 2008.

== Professional career ==
Pre-draft measurables
Height	Weight	Arm length	Hand span	40-yard dash	10-yard split	20-yard split	Bench press
6 ft 1 1/2 in (1.87 m)	198 lb (90 kg)	30 5/8 in (0.78 m)	9 1/2 in (0.24 m)	4.78 s	1.77 s	2.86 s	8 reps
All values are from NFL Combine

=== Indianapolis Colts ===
After going undrafted in the 2009 NFL draft, Masthay signed with the Indianapolis Colts. He was released by the Colts on August 11, 2009.

=== Green Bay Packers ===
Masthay was signed by the Green Bay Packers to a reserve/future contract on January 15, 2010.

On November 3, 2010, he was named NFC Special Teams Player of the Week.

At the end of the 2010 season, Masthay and the Packers appeared in Super Bowl XLV against the Pittsburgh Steelers. In the 31–25 win, he punted six times for 243 net yards (40.5 average).

During the 2011 NFL season, Masthay set franchise records for gross and net punting averages for a season with a 45.6 gross and 38.5 net yard average.

He threw a 27-yard touchdown to tight end Tom Crabtree off of a fake field goal in a Week 2 game against the Chicago Bears during the 2012 NFL season.

On August 30, 2016, Masthay was released by the Packers.

== Career statistics ==
=== NFL ===
Source: Pro-Football-Reference.com

Season	Team		Kicking			
Season	Team	GP	Pnts	Yds	Lng	Avg
2010	Green Bay Packers	16	71	3,114	62	43.9
2011	Green Bay Packers	16	55	2,506	71	45.6
2012	Green Bay Packers	16	70	3,043	65	43.5
2013	Green Bay Packers	16	64	2,854	62	44.6
2014	Green Bay Packers	16	49	2,159	63	44.1
2015	Green Bay Packers	16	81	3,554	62	43.9
	Total	96	390	17,230	71	44.2

=== College ===
Year	Team	G	Punting				
Year	Team	G	Punts	Yds	Lng	Avg	In 20
2005	UK	11	54	1,965	59	36.4	15
2006	UK	13	50	1,959	60	39.2	13
2007	UK	13	50	1,992	63	39.8	16
2008	UK	13	53	2,397	72	45.2	13
Total		50	207	8,313	72	40.2	57

== Post-football career ==
Masthay joined the Centre Colonels soccer staff as a volunteer assistant coach in the spring of 2018.
