= Ken Willis =

American football player (born 1966)

No. 1, 3
- Position: Placekicker

Personal information
- Born: October 6, 1966 (age 60); Owensboro, Kentucky, U.S.
- Listed height: 5 ft 11 in (1.80 m)
- Listed weight: 190 lb (86 kg)

Career information
- High school: Owensboro
- College: Kentucky
- NFL draft: 1990: undrafted

Career history
- Dallas Cowboys (1990–1991); Tampa Bay Buccaneers (1992); New York Giants (1992)

Career NFL statistics
- Field goals made: 55
- Field goal attempts: 80
- Field goal %: 68.8
- Longest field goal: 54
- Stats at Pro Football Reference

Robert Kenneth Willis II (born October 6, 1966) is an American former professional football player who was a placekicker in the National Football League (NFL) for the Dallas Cowboys, Tampa Bay Buccaneers, and New York Giants. He played college football for the Kentucky Wildcats.

== Early life ==
Willis attended Owensboro High School, where he was a kicker and punter. He was a teammate of future NFL player Mark Higgs. He received All-region honors as a senior.

He also lettered in baseball and soccer. He was named All-conference in baseball as a senior.

== College career ==
Willis moved on to play for Centre College, where he was the team's kicker and punter. He transferred to the University of Kentucky at the end of his first year.

In 1986, he was redshirted. As a sophomore, he handled all of the team's kickoffs. The next season, he earned the placekicker starting job.

As a senior, he registered a 77.3% average (17 of 22) on field goal attempts, good for third in school history. He also set the school mark for points in a game (15) and tied the school record for field goals in a game (4).

He left as the school's most accurate kicker with a 70.8% average (29 of 41) on field goals. He also made 29 field goals (second in school history) and had an 89% average (34 of 38) on extra points.

A Math major, he received Academic All-SEC honors three years in a row.

== Professional career ==
=== Dallas Cowboys ===
Willis was signed as an undrafted free agent by the Dallas Cowboys after the 1990 NFL draft. He earned the starting job over Luis Zendejas in preseason, becoming the first rookie to kick for the club since Efren Herrera in 1974. He set a franchise record for points by a rookie (80), surpassing the previous mark of 78 points held by Bob Hayes and Tony Dorsett. He finished seventh in the NFL with an 86% average (18-of-21) on field goals.

In 1991, he tied franchise records with 9 straight field goals, 27 field goals made and set one with four 50-yarders (including a 54-yard field goal). He also finished as the NFC's second-leading kicker with 118 points and had a team record 39 attempts.

He was left unprotected in Plan B free agency after accepting a $25,000 advance on his salary and agreeing verbally with the Cowboys that he would not sign with any other team. After the Tampa Bay Buccaneers lost Steve Christie in a similar situation, they targeted Willis as their replacement and convinced him to sign a two-year deal potentially worth more than $800,000 (including a $100,000 signing bonus), leaving the Cowboys scrambling for a kicker.

=== Tampa Bay Buccaneers ===
In 1992, after struggling (8 of 14 field goals made) and missing 3 critical attempts during a 7 games span, he was replaced with Eddie Murray and released on November 10.

=== New York Giants ===
On November 21, 1992, he signed with the New York Giants to replace an injured Matt Bahr (sprained right knee). He played in 6 games and didn't miss a field goal or an extra point. The next year, he suffered a career-ending stress fracture in his left leg during training camp and was waived injured on July 27, 1993.

== Personal life ==
Willis pursued a career in teaching after football. He is currently retired as of 2022, but was a math teacher at Bentonville High School and previously at Lafayette High School. He was also a middle school math teacher in the Owensboro Public School system.
