= Bill Ransdell =

American football player (born 1963)

Profile
- Position: Quarterback

Personal information
- Born: April 15, 1963 (age 63); Canton, Ohio, U.S.
- Listed height: 6 ft 2 in (1.88 m)
- Listed weight: 212 lb (96 kg)

Career information
- High school: Elizabethtown (Elizabethtown, Kentucky)
- College: Kentucky (1982–1986)
- NFL draft: 1987: 12th round, 327th overall pick

Career history
- New York Jets (1987); Tampa Bay Buccaneers (1988)*; Indianapolis Colts (1988)
- * Offseason or practice squad member only

George William Ransdell III (born April 15, 1963) is an American former football quarterback. He played college football for the Kentucky Wildcats and was selected by the New York Jets in the 12th round of the 1987 NFL draft.

== Early life ==
George William Ransdell III was born on April 15, 1963, in Canton, Ohio. He attended Elizabethtown High School in Elizabethtown, Kentucky.

== College career ==
Ransdell enrolled at the University of Kentucky to play college football for the Wildcats. He redshirted the 1982 season and was a four-year letterman from 1983 to 1986. He backed up Randy Jenkins in 1983, appearing in several games in relief while completing 37 of 63 passes (58.7%) for 462 yards, three touchdowns, and three interceptions. Ransdell was the primary starter for the Wildcats from 1984 to 1986. He missed playing time in 1985 due to a broken rib and collapsed lung. He finished his college career completing 469 of 816 passes (57.5%) for 5,564 yards, 22 touchdowns, and 29 interceptions while also scoring one rushing touchdown. Ransdell had the school record for passing yards until Tim Couch broke it in 1998.

== Professional career ==
Ransdell was selected by the New York Jets in the 12th round, with the 327th overall pick, of the 1987 NFL draft. He was placed on injured reserve on August 25, 1987, and was released on November 4, 1987.

Ransdell signed with the Tampa Bay Buccaneers on April 5, 1988. He was waived on August 27, 1988.

On October 27, 1988, it was reported that Ransdell had signed with the Indianapolis Colts. He was the third-string quarterback for the game against the Denver Broncos on October 31 behind starter Chris Chandler and second-stringer Gary Hogeboom. Ransdell did not dress in the following week's game against the Jets, and was then released on November 8, 1988.

== See also ==
- Kentucky Wildcats football statistical leaders
