= 2005 South Carolina Gamecocks football team =

American college football season

2005 South Carolina Gamecocks football

Independence Bowl, L 31–38 vs. Missouri
- Conference: Southeastern Conference
- Eastern Division
- Record: 7–5 (5–3 SEC)
- Head coach: Steve Spurrier (1st season)
- Offensive scheme: Fun and gun
- Defensive coordinator: Tyrone Nix (1st season)
- Co-defensive coordinator: John Thompson (1st season)
- Base defense: 4–3
- Home stadium: Williams-Brice Stadium

2005 Southeastern Conference football standings
	Conf.			Overall
Team	W		L	W		L
Eastern Division
No. 10 Georgia x$	6	–	2	10	–	3
South Carolina	5	–	3	7	–	5
No. 12 Florida	5	–	3	9	–	3
Vanderbilt	3	–	5	5	–	6
Tennessee	3	–	5	5	–	6
Kentucky	2	–	6	3	–	8
Western Division
No. 5 LSU xy	7	–	1	11	–	2
No. 14 Auburn x	7	–	1	9	–	3
No. 8 Alabama	6	–	2	10	–	2
Arkansas	2	–	6	4	–	7
Mississippi State	1	–	7	3	–	8
Ole Miss	1	–	7	3	–	8
Championship: Georgia 34, LSU 14
$ – BCS representative as conference champion; x – Division champion/co-champions; y – Championship game participant; Alabama had all victories vacated by the NCAA in 2010. As such, the official record for Alabama is 0–2 (0–2).; Rankings from AP Poll

The 2005 South Carolina Gamecocks football team represented the University of South Carolina in the Southeastern Conference during the 2005 NCAA Division I-A football season. The Gamecocks were led by Steve Spurrier in his first season as USC head coach and played their home games in Williams-Brice Stadium in Columbia, South Carolina. For leading the Gamecocks to a 5–3 conference record during his first year at South Carolina, Steve Spurrier was named SEC Coach of the Year.

== Schedule ==
The South Carolina–Georgia game on September 10, 2005

The September 1 game versus UCF played host to ESPN's College Gameday, the second year in a row that South Carolina had hosted the program. During the show, ESPN personality Lee Corso made disparaging remarks about the viability of the South Carolina football program which were met with derision by the Columbia crowd. In the 2005 season, the Gamecocks defeated Tennessee and Florida, two of the three teams Corso stated they could never beat.

Date	Time	Opponent	Rank	Site	TV	Result	Attendance
September 1	7:30 pm	UCF*		Williams-Brice Stadium; Columbia, South Carolina (College GameDay)	ESPN	W 24–15	82,753
September 10	5:30 pm	at No. 9 Georgia		Sanford Stadium; Athens, Georgia (rivalry)	ESPN	L 15–17	92,476
September 17	3:30 pm	Alabama		Williams-Brice Stadium; Columbia, South Carolina	CBS	L 14–37 ‡	82,968
September 24	7:00 pm	Troy*		Williams-Brice Stadium; Columbia, South Carolina	PPV	W 45–20	79,125
October 1	7:00 pm	at Auburn		Jordan–Hare Stadium; Auburn, Alabama	ESPN2	L 7–48	87,451
October 8	1:00 pm	Kentucky^{†}		Williams-Brice Stadium; Columbia, South Carolina	PPV	W 44–16	71,009
October 22	3:30 pm	Vanderbilt		Williams-Brice Stadium; Columbia, South Carolina	CSS	W 35–28	76,427
October 29	8:00 pm	at No. 23 Tennessee		Neyland Stadium; Knoxville, Tennessee (rivalry)	ESPN2/CSS	W 16–15	107,716
November 5	12:30 pm	at Arkansas		Donald W. Reynolds Razorback Stadium; Fayetteville, Arkansas	JPS	W 14–10	65,837
November 12	12:30 pm	No. 12 Florida		Williams-Brice Stadium; Columbia, South Carolina	JPS	W 30–22	83,421
November 19	7:00 pm	Clemson*	No. 19	Williams-Brice Stadium; Columbia, South Carolina (Palmetto Bowl)	ESPN2	L 9–13	83,368
December 30	3:30 pm	vs. Missouri*		Independence Stadium; Shreveport, Louisiana (Independence Bowl)	ESPN	L 31–38	41,332
*Non-conference game; ^{†}Homecoming; Rankings from AP Poll released prior to the game; All times are in Eastern time

‡ As part of their penalty for NCAA violations, Alabama has retroactively vacated its 2005 victory over South Carolina. However, the penalty to vacate victories does not result in a loss (or forfeiture) of the affected game or award a victory to the opponent, therefore South Carolina still considers the game a loss in their official records.
