= 2005 Arkansas Razorbacks football team =

American college football season

2005 Arkansas Razorbacks football
- Conference: Southeastern Conference
- Western Division
- Record: 4–7 (2–6 SEC)
- Head coach: Houston Nutt (8th season)
- Offensive coordinator: Roy Wittke (3rd season)
- Offensive scheme: Pro-style
- Defensive coordinator: Reggie Herring (1st season)
- Base defense: 4–3
- Captains: Pierre Brown; Kyle Dickerson; Brandon Kennedy; Kyle Roper; Vickiel Vaughn
- Home stadium: Donald W. Reynolds Razorback Stadium; War Memorial Stadium

2005 Southeastern Conference football standings
	Conf.			Overall
Team	W		L	W		L
Eastern Division
No. 10 Georgia x$	6	–	2	10	–	3
South Carolina	5	–	3	7	–	5
No. 12 Florida	5	–	3	9	–	3
Vanderbilt	3	–	5	5	–	6
Tennessee	3	–	5	5	–	6
Kentucky	2	–	6	3	–	8
Western Division
No. 5 LSU xy	7	–	1	11	–	2
No. 14 Auburn x	7	–	1	9	–	3
No. 8 Alabama	6	–	2	10	–	2
Arkansas	2	–	6	4	–	7
Mississippi State	1	–	7	3	–	8
Ole Miss	1	–	7	3	–	8
Championship: Georgia 34, LSU 14
$ – BCS representative as conference champion; x – Division champion/co-champions; y – Championship game participant; Alabama had all victories vacated by the NCAA in 2010. As such, the official record for Alabama is 0–2 (0–2).; Rankings from AP Poll

The 2005 Arkansas Razorbacks football team represented the University of Arkansas as a member of the Southeastern Conference (SEC) during the 2005 NCAA Division I-A football season. Led by eighth-year head coach Houston Nutt, the Razorbacks compiled an overall record of 4–7 with a mark of 2–6 in conference play, placing fourth in the SEC's Western Division. The team played four home games at Donald W. Reynolds Razorback Stadium in Fayetteville, Arkansas and two home games at War Memorial Stadium in Little Rock, Arkansas.

Running back Darren McFadden became the first Arkansas freshman to rush for over 1,000 yards in a season.

== Schedule ==
Date	Time	Opponent	Site	TV	Result	Attendance	Source
September 3	6:00 pm	Missouri State*	Donald W. Reynolds Razorback Stadium; Fayetteville, AR		W 49–17	66,424	
September 10	6:00 pm	Vanderbilt	Donald W. Reynolds Razorback Stadium; Fayetteville, AR		L 24–28	68,215	
September 17	9:15 pm	at No. 1 USC*	Los Angeles Memorial Coliseum; Los Angeles, CA	FSN	L 17–70	90,411	
September 24	11:30 am	at No. 20 Alabama	Bryant–Denny Stadium; Tuscaloosa, AL	JPS	L 13–24	81,018	
October 8	6:00 pm	Louisiana–Monroe*	War Memorial Stadium; Little Rock, AR		W 44–15	54,209	
October 15	6:00 pm	No. 21 Auburn	Donald W. Reynolds Razorback Stadium; Fayetteville, AR		L 17–34	71,673	
October 22	11:30 am	at No. 4 Georgia	Sanford Stadium; Athens, GA	JPS	L 20–23	92,746	
November 5	11:30 am	South Carolina^{†}	Donald W. Reynolds Razorback Stadium; Fayetteville, AR	JPS	L 10–14	65,837	
November 12	1:00 pm	at Ole Miss	Vaught–Hemingway Stadium; Oxford, MS (rivalry)		W 28–17	53,289	
November 19	1:00 pm	Mississippi State	War Memorial Stadium; Little Rock, AR		W 44–10	55,712	
November 25	1:30 pm	at No. 3 LSU	Tiger Stadium; Baton Rouge, LA (rivalry)	CBS	L 17–19	92,127	
*Non-conference game; ^{†}Homecoming; Rankings from AP Poll released prior to the game; All times are in Central time

== Preseason ==
Arkansas was ranked as the 45th best team in the country by NationalChamps.net and projected to finish 6–5.

== Game summaries ==
=== Missouri State ===
	1	2	3	4	Total
(FCS) Bears	3	0	14	0	17
Arkansas	14	14	0	21	49

=== Vanderbilt ===
	1	2	3	4	Total
Commodores	0	10	3	15	28
Razorbacks	7	3	14	0	24

=== At No. 1 USC ===
	1	2	3	4	Total
Razorbacks	7	3	0	7	17
No. 1 Trojans	28	14	14	14	70

=== At No. 20 Alabama ===
	1	2	3	4	Total
Razorbacks	0	3	0	10	13
No. 20 Crimson Tide	0	7	3	14	24

=== Louisiana–Monroe ===
	1	2	3	4	Total
Indians	2	6	0	7	15
Razorbacks	10	13	21	0	44

=== No. 21 Auburn ===
	1	2	3	4	Total
No. 21 Tigers	0	6	14	14	34
Razorbacks	3	7	0	7	17

=== At No. 4 Georgia ===
	1	2	3	4	Total
Razorbacks	0	7	3	10	20
No. 4 Bulldogs	7	10	3	3	23

=== South Carolina ===
	1	2	3	4	Total
Gamecocks	7	0	7	0	14
Razorbacks	0	10	0	0	10

=== At Ole Miss ===
	1	2	3	4	Total
Razorbacks	7	0	7	14	28
Rebels	7	7	3	0	17

=== Mississippi State ===
	1	2	3	4	Total
Bulldogs	0	3	7	0	10
Razorbacks	14	27	0	3	44

=== At No. 3 LSU ===
	1	2	3	4	Total
Razorbacks	0	3	8	6	17
No. 3 Tigers	0	12	7	0	19

== Coaching staff ==
- Athletic director: Frank Broyles
- Head coach: Houston Nutt
- Assistants: Reggie Herring (DC/LB), Mike Markuson (OL / running game), Roy Wittke (QB / passing game), Bobby Allen (CB), Clifton Ealy (TE), Danny Nutt (RB), Tracy Rocker (DL), James Shibest (WR/specialists), Chris Vaughn (S/recruiting)

== Awards and honors ==
- All-American: KR/RB Felix Jones (CollegeFootballNews.com 1st team)
- All-SEC: DT Keith Jackson (AP 2nd Team), KR/RB Felix Jones (Coaches' 2nd), RB Darren McFadden (AP/Coaches' 1st), LB Sam Olajubutu (AP 2nd), C Kyle Roper (AP 2nd)
