= 2005 Mississippi State Bulldogs football team =

American college football season

2005 Mississippi State Bulldogs football
- Conference: Southeastern Conference
- Western Division
- Record: 3–8 (1–7 SEC)
- Head coach: Sylvester Croom (2nd season)
- Offensive coordinator: Woody McCorvey (2nd season)
- Offensive scheme: West Coast
- Defensive coordinator: Ellis Johnson (2nd season)
- Home stadium: Davis Wade Stadium

2005 Southeastern Conference football standings
	Conf.			Overall
Team	W		L	W		L
Eastern Division
No. 10 Georgia x$	6	–	2	10	–	3
South Carolina	5	–	3	7	–	5
No. 12 Florida	5	–	3	9	–	3
Vanderbilt	3	–	5	5	–	6
Tennessee	3	–	5	5	–	6
Kentucky	2	–	6	3	–	8
Western Division
No. 5 LSU xy	7	–	1	11	–	2
No. 14 Auburn x	7	–	1	9	–	3
No. 8 Alabama	6	–	2	10	–	2
Arkansas	2	–	6	4	–	7
Mississippi State	1	–	7	3	–	8
Ole Miss	1	–	7	3	–	8
Championship: Georgia 34, LSU 14
$ – BCS representative as conference champion; x – Division champion/co-champions; y – Championship game participant; Alabama had all victories vacated by the NCAA in 2010. As such, the official record for Alabama is 0–2 (0–2).; Rankings from AP Poll

The 2005 Mississippi State Bulldogs football team represented Mississippi State University as a member of the Western Division of the Southern Conference (SEC) during the 2005 NCAA Division I-A football season. Led by second-year head coach Sylvester Croom, the Bulldogs compiled an overall record of 3–8 with a mark of 1–7 in conference play, tying for fifth place in the SEC's Western Division. Mississippi State played home games at Davis Wade Stadium in Starkville, Mississippi.

== Schedule ==
Date	Time	Opponent	Site	TV	Result	Attendance
September 3	6:00 pm	Murray State*	Davis Wade Stadium; Starkville, MS		W 38–6	41,143
September 10	11:30 am	at No. 25 Auburn	Jordan-Hare Stadium; Auburn, AL	JPS	L 0–28	81,921
September 17	7:00 pm	at Tulane*	Independence Stadium; Shreveport, LA	CSTV	W 21–14	16,421
September 24	6:45 pm	No. 6 Georgia	Davis Wade Stadium; Starkville, MS	ESPN2	L 10–23	49,903
October 1	1:30 pm	No. 5 LSU	Davis Wade Stadium; Starkville, MS (rivalry)	PPV	L 7–37	48,344
October 8	11:30 am	at No. 13 Florida	Ben Hill Griffin Stadium; Gainesville, FL	JPS	L 9–35	90,104
October 22	1:30 pm	Houston*^{†}	Davis Wade Stadium; Starkville, MS		L 16–28	40,957
October 29	6:00 pm	at Kentucky	Commonwealth Stadium; Lexington, KY		L 7–13	55,163
November 5	2:30 pm	No. 4 Alabama	Davis Wade Stadium; Starkville, MS (rivalry)	CBS	L 0–17	52,125
November 19	1:00 pm	at Arkansas	War Memorial Stadium; Little Rock, AR		L 10–44	55,712
November 26	1:30 pm	Ole Miss	Davis Wade Stadium; Starkville, MS (Egg Bowl)		W 35–14	53,655
*Non-conference game; ^{†}Homecoming; Rankings from AP Poll released prior to the game; All times are in Central time
