= 2005 Ole Miss Rebels football team =

American college football season

2005 Ole Miss Rebels football
- Conference: Southeastern Conference
- Western Division
- Record: 3–8 (1–7 SEC)
- Head coach: Ed Orgeron (1st season)
- Offensive coordinator: Noel Mazzone (5th season)
- Offensive scheme: Spread
- Base defense: 4–3
- Captains: Michael Bozeman; Tre' Stallings
- Home stadium: Vaught–Hemingway Stadium

2005 Southeastern Conference football standings
	Conf.			Overall
Team	W		L	W		L
Eastern Division
No. 10 Georgia x$	6	–	2	10	–	3
South Carolina	5	–	3	7	–	5
No. 12 Florida	5	–	3	9	–	3
Vanderbilt	3	–	5	5	–	6
Tennessee	3	–	5	5	–	6
Kentucky	2	–	6	3	–	8
Western Division
No. 5 LSU xy	7	–	1	11	–	2
No. 14 Auburn x	7	–	1	9	–	3
No. 8 Alabama	6	–	2	10	–	2
Arkansas	2	–	6	4	–	7
Mississippi State	1	–	7	3	–	8
Ole Miss	1	–	7	3	–	8
Championship: Georgia 34, LSU 14
$ – BCS representative as conference champion; x – Division champion/co-champions; y – Championship game participant; Alabama had all victories vacated by the NCAA in 2010. As such, the official record for Alabama is 0–2 (0–2).; Rankings from AP Poll

The 2005 Ole Miss Rebels football team represented the University of Mississippi as a member of the Western Division of the Southeastern Conference (SEC) during the 2005 NCAA Division I-AA football season. Led by first-year head coach Ed Orgeron, the Rebels compiled an overall record of 3–8 with a mark of 1–7 in conference play, tying of fifth place in the SEC's Western Division. Ole Miss played home games at Vaught–Hemingway Stadium in Oxford, Mississippi.

== Schedule ==
Date	Time	Opponent	Site	TV	Result	Attendance
September 5	3:30 pm	at Memphis*	Liberty Bowl Memorial Stadium; Memphis, TN (rivalry)	ESPN	W 10–6	53,339
September 17	11:30 am	at Vanderbilt	Vanderbilt Stadium; Nashville, TN (rivalry)	JPS	L 23–31	34,847
September 24	6:00 pm	Wyoming*	Vaught–Hemingway Stadium; Oxford, MS		L 14–24	53,652
October 1	11:30 am	at No. 10 Tennessee	Neyland Stadium; Knoxville, TN (rivalry)	JPS	L 10–27	107,709
October 8	1:00 pm	The Citadel*^{†}	Vaught–Hemingway Stadium; Oxford, MS		W 27–7	50,272
October 15	2:30 pm	No. 6 Alabama	Vaught–Hemingway Stadium; Oxford, MS (rivalry)	CBS	L 10–13	60,135
October 22	1:00 pm	Kentucky	Vaught–Hemingway Stadium; Oxford, MS		W 13–7	48,457
October 29	11:30 am	at No. 19 Auburn	Jordan-Hare Stadium; Auburn, AL (rivalry)	JPS	L 3–27	85,791
November 12	1:00 pm	Arkansas	Vaught–Hemingway Stadium; Oxford, MS (rivalry)		L 17–28	53,289
November 19	6:45 pm	No. 4 LSU	Vaught–Hemingway Stadium; Oxford, MS (rivalry)	ESPN2	L 7–40	59,543
November 26	1:30 pm	at Mississippi State	Davis Wade Stadium; Starkville, MS (Egg Bowl)		L 14–35	53,655
*Non-conference game; ^{†}Homecoming; Rankings from AP Poll released prior to the game; All times are in Central time

== Roster ==
2005 Ole Miss Rebels football team roster
Players			Coaches
Offense: Pos. / # / Name / Class; WR / / Mike Espy / Sr	Defense: Pos. / # / Name / Class	Special teams: Pos. / # / Name / Class	Head coach: Ed Orgeron; Coordinators/assistant coaches: Tony Hughes – Defensive backs; Ryan Nielsen – Defensive line; Legend: (C) Team captain; (S) Suspended; (I) Ineligible; Injured; Redshirt

== Game summaries ==
=== At Memphis ===
	1	2	3	4	Total
Rebels	3	0	7	0	10
Tigers	3	3	0	0	6

=== At Vanderbilt ===
	1	2	3	4	Total
Rebels	3	0	14	6	23
Commodores	3	14	7	7	31

=== Wyoming ===
	1	2	3	4	Total
Cowboys	0	13	11	0	24
Rebels	7	0	0	7	14

=== At No. 10 Tennessee ===
	1	2	3	4	Total
Rebels	3	0	0	7	10
No. 10 Volunteers	14	3	3	7	27

=== The Citadel ===
	1	2	3	4	Total
Bulldogs	0	0	7	0	7
Rebels	3	0	21	3	27

=== No. 6 Alabama ===
	1	2	3	4	Total
No. 6 Crimson Tide	0	3	7	3	13
Rebels	7	0	0	3	10

=== Kentucky ===
	1	2	3	4	Total
Wildcats	0	0	0	7	7
Rebels	0	10	0	3	13

=== At No. 19 Auburn ===
	1	2	3	4	Total
Rebels	0	3	0	0	3
No. 19 Tigers	0	13	7	7	27

=== Arkansas ===
	1	2	3	4	Total
Razorbacks	7	0	7	14	28
Rebels	7	7	3	0	17

=== No. 4 LSU ===
	1	2	3	4	Total
No. 4 Tigers	2	14	10	14	40
Rebels	0	0	0	7	7

=== At Mississippi State ===
	1	2	3	4	Total
Rebels	7	7	0	0	14
Bulldogs	0	21	0	14	35
