= Benny Snell =

American football player (born 1998)

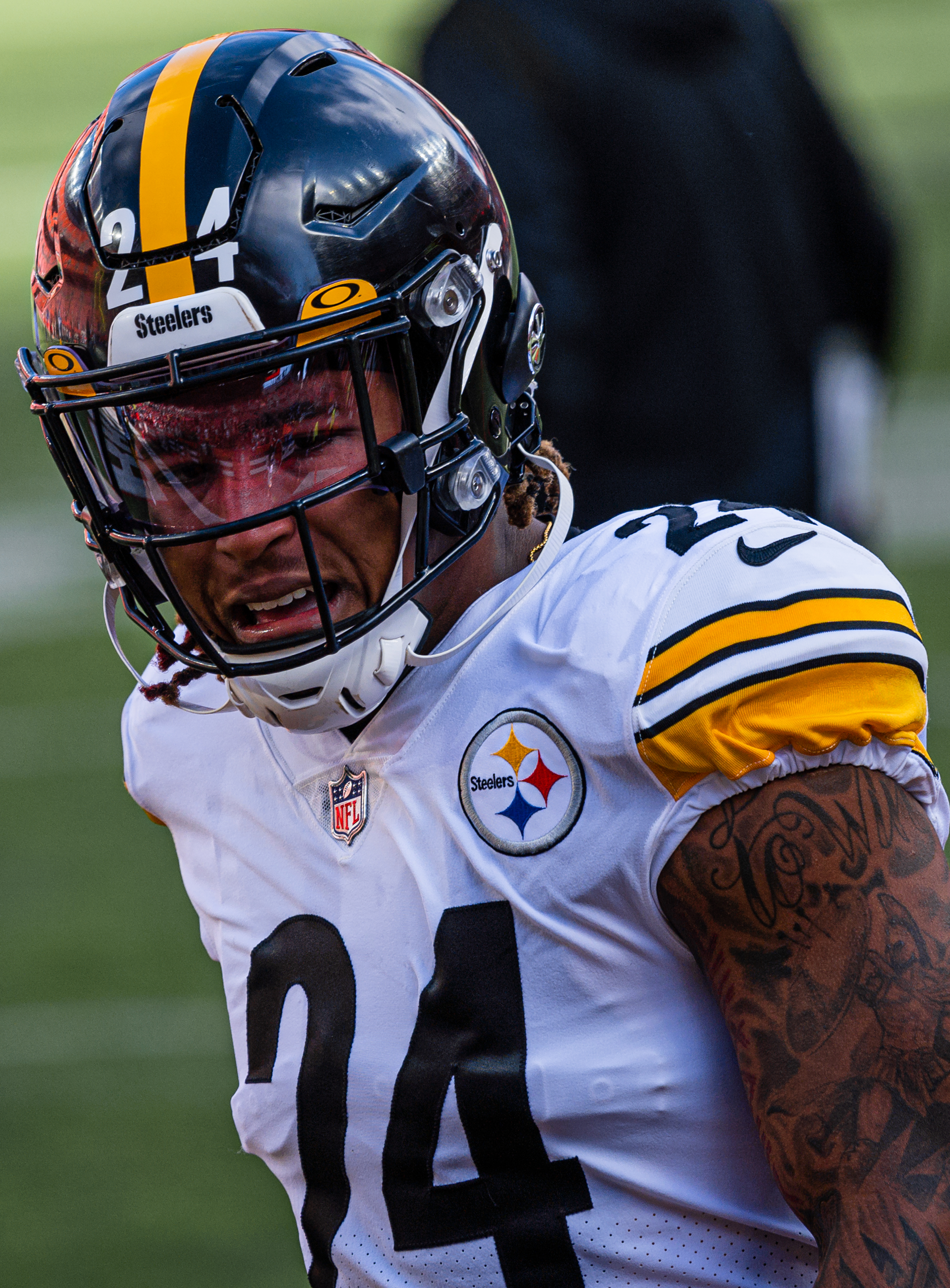
- Snell with the Pittsburgh Steelers in 2021

Profile
- Position: Running back

Personal information
- Born: February 26, 1998 (age 28); Columbus, Ohio, U.S.
- Listed height: 5 ft 10 in (1.78 m)
- Listed weight: 224 lb (102 kg)

Career information
- High school: Westerville Central (Westerville, Ohio)
- College: Kentucky (2016–2018)
- NFL draft: 2019: 4th round, 122nd overall pick

Career history
- Pittsburgh Steelers (2019–2022); Detroit Lions (2023)*; Louisville Kings (2026)
- * Offseason or practice squad member only

Awards and highlights
- Third-team All-American (2018); Freshman All-American (2016); 2× First-team All-SEC (2017, 2018); 2019 Citrus Bowl MVP

Career NFL statistics
- Rushing yards: 982
- Rushing average: 3.6
- Rushing touchdowns: 7
- Receptions: 17
- Receiving yards: 114
- Stats at Pro Football Reference

Benjamin Snell Jr. (born February 26, 1998) is an American professional football running back. He played college football for the Kentucky Wildcats. Snell's paternal grandfather was a first cousin of former New York Jets running back Matt Snell. His father, Benjamin Snell Sr. is an alumnus of Ohio Northern University, played in the NFL and the XFL.

== Early life ==
Snell Jr. attended Westerville Central High School. During his time there, he won two Ohio Capital Conference titles. During his junior season, Snell Jr. rushed for 2,077 yards while scoring 26 touchdowns on the ground, he also had two receiving touchdowns that year. As a senior, he totaled 1,826 rushing yards, 264 receiving yards and 29 touchdowns. Snell Jr. was rated as a three-star recruit. He chose Kentucky over Iowa, Cincinnati, Boston College, Toledo and West Virginia.

== College career ==
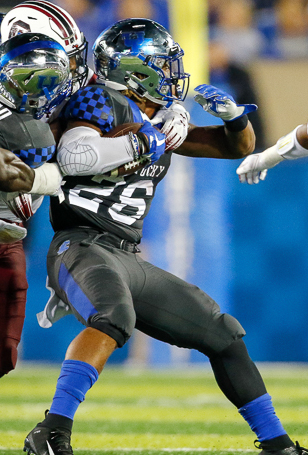
Snell with Kentucky in 2018

=== Freshman ===
As a freshman in 2016, Snell rushed for 1,091 yards, breaking the Kentucky freshman rushing record which was held by Moe Williams. Snell Jr. managed to score 13 rushing touchdowns. During his freshman season, Snell Jr set six Kentucky freshman records, including most rushing touchdowns in a game (4), most rushing yards by a freshman (1,091), most rushing touchdowns by a freshman (13), most total touchdowns by a freshman (13), most 100-yard rushing games (5) and most rushing yards by a freshman in a single game (192). At the end of his freshman season Snell Jr, was selected as a True Freshman All-American by ESPN and 247Sports, Football Writers Association of America (FWAA) Freshman All-American, Freshman All-Southeastern Conference (SEC) and a Second-team All-SEC pick by Pro Football Focus.

=== Sophomore ===
As a sophomore in 2017, Snell rushed for 1,333 rushing yards and scored 19 rushing touchdowns. Snell Jr. became the first Kentucky player with 10 or more career 100-yard rushing games prior to his junior season. He became the only SEC player since 2000 to have at least 116 rushing yards and at least three rushing touchdowns in three consecutive games. Snell Jr. became the ninth player in school history to reach 2,000 rushing yards in his career and the 19th player in SEC history to reach 2,000 career rushing yards prior to his junior season. He became the only player in school history to have back-to-back 1,000 rushing yard seasons. Snell Jr. was selected as a preseason Associated Press All-SEC First-team and All-SEC Second-team. In addition, Snell Jr. was put on the Doak Walker Award Watch List and the Maxwell Award Watch List.

=== Junior ===
As a junior in 2018, Snell rushed for 1,449 rushing yards and scored 16 rushing touchdowns. Snell Jr. became one of four running backs in SEC history to have three consecutive 1,000 rushing yard seasons, the others being Herschel Walker, Darren McFadden, and Alex Collins. Snell Jr. would also become the school's career rushing yards leader after scoring on a 12-yard touchdown run against the Penn State Nittany Lions in the 2019 Citrus Bowl. This 43-year-old record, previously held by Sonny Collins, was broken in just three seasons by Snell. Snell was voted First-team All-SEC by SEC Coaches. He would announce on December 14, 2018, that he would forgo his senior season and enter the 2019 NFL draft.

== Professional career ==
Pre-draft measurables
Height	Weight	Arm length	Hand span	Wingspan	40-yard dash	10-yard split	20-yard split	20-yard shuttle	Three-cone drill	Vertical jump	Broad jump	Bench press
5 ft 10 3/8 in (1.79 m)	224 lb (102 kg)	31 in (0.79 m)	9 3/8 in (0.24 m)	6 ft 2 1/4 in (1.89 m)	4.66 s	1.65 s	2.73 s	4.33 s	7.07 s	29.5 in (0.75 m)	9 ft 11 in (3.02 m)	16 reps
All values from NFL Combine

=== Pittsburgh Steelers ===
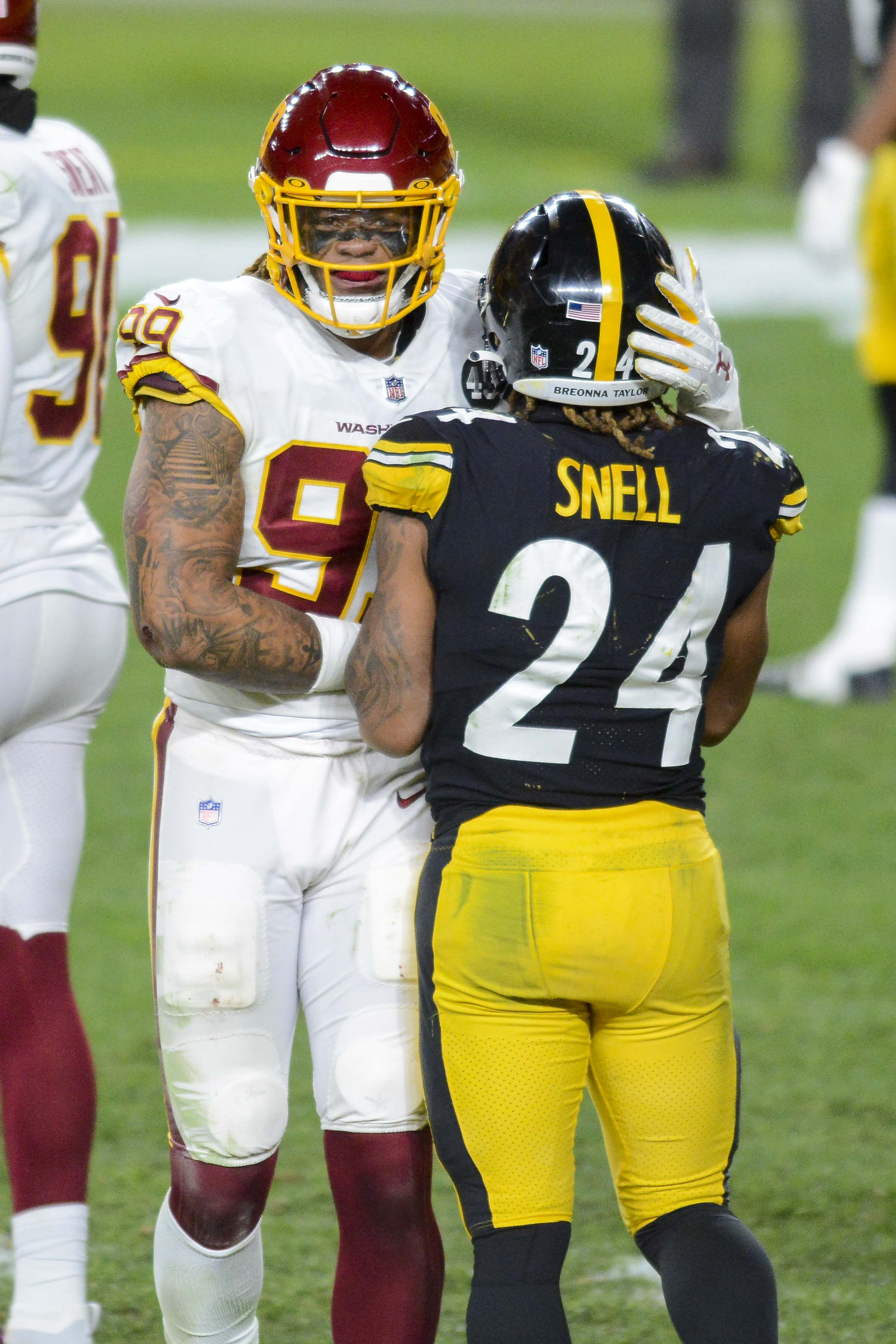
Snell (right) in 2020

Snell was selected by the Pittsburgh Steelers in the fourth round with the 122nd overall pick in the 2019 NFL Draft.

In Week 13 against the Cleveland Browns, Snell rushed 16 times for 63 yards and his first career rushing touchdown in the 20–13 win. In Week 17 against the Baltimore Ravens, Snell rushed 18 times for 91 yards and a touchdown during the 28–10 loss. As a rookie, Snell finished with 108 carries for 426 rushing yards and two rushing touchdowns.

Snell's first big breakthrough came on Monday Night Football against the New York Giants in Week 1 of the 2020 season after starter James Conner suffered an injury. He finished with 19 carries for 113 rushing yards as the Steelers won 26–16. In Week 15 against the Cincinnati Bengals on Monday Night Football, Snell recorded 107 yards from scrimmage and a rushing touchdown during the 27–17 loss.

=== Detroit Lions ===
On August 10, 2023, Snell signed with the Detroit Lions. He was released by the Lions on August 29.

=== Louisville Kings ===
On January 14, 2026, Snell was selected by the Louisville Kings of the United Football League (UFL). He was released by Louisville on April 19.

== Career statistics ==
Legend
**Bold**	Career high

=== NFL ===
Year	Team	Games		Rushing					Receiving					Fumbles	
Year	Team	GP	GS	Att	Yds	Avg	Lng	TD	Rec	Yds	Avg	Lng	TD	Fum	Lost
2019	PIT	13	2	108	**426**	3.9	23	2	3	23	7.7	**14**	0	1	**1**
2020	PIT	16	3	**111**	368	3.3	**30**	**4**	**10**	**61**	6.1	**14**	0	**2**	**1**
2021	PIT	17	0	36	98	2.7	9	0	2	13	6.5	7	0	0	0
2022	PIT	14	0	20	90	**4.5**	16	1	2	17	**8.5**	11	0	0	0
Career		60	5	275	982	3.6	30	7	17	114	7.2	14	0	3	2

=== College ===
		Rushing					Receiving		
Year	Team	Att	Yds	Avg	Lng	TD	Rec	Yds	TD
2016	Kentucky	186	1,091	**5.9**	48	13	2	39	0
2017	Kentucky	262	1,333	5.1	**71**	**19**	9	72	0
2018	Kentucky	**289**	**1,449**	5.0	52	16	**17**	**105**	0
Career		737	3,873	5.3	71	48	28	216	0
