= Artose Pinner =

American football player (born 1978)

No. 21, 22, 20
- Position: Running back

Personal information
- Born: January 5, 1978 (age 48); Hopkinsville, Kentucky, U.S.
- Listed height: 5 ft 10 in (1.78 m)
- Listed weight: 232 lb (105 kg)

Career information
- High school: Hopkinsville
- College: Kentucky
- NFL draft: 2003: 4th round, 99th overall pick

Career history
- Detroit Lions (2003–2005); Minnesota Vikings (2006); Atlanta Falcons (2007); New Orleans Saints (2007); Detroit Lions (2008)*
- * Offseason or practice squad member only

Awards and highlights
- SEC Offensive Player of the Year (2002); First-team All-SEC (2002)

Career NFL statistics
- Rushing attempts: 250
- Rushing yards: 858
- Rushing touchdowns: 8
- Receptions: 39
- Receiving yards: 308
- Stats at Pro Football Reference

Artose Deonce Pinner (born January 5, 1978) is an American former professional football player who was a running back in the National Football League (NFL). He was selected by the Detroit Lions in the fourth round of the 2003 NFL draft. He played college football for the Kentucky Wildcats.

== Early life ==
Pinner attended Hopkinsville High School in Hopkinsville, Kentucky, and was a standout in football and track. In track, he was a two-time Regional Champion in the 400 meter dash.

== College career ==
He was a star running back for the University of Kentucky between 1999 and 2002, running for 1414 yards in 2002, second-most in a single season in school history to Moe Williams.

== Professional career ==
Pinner was selected with the second pick of the fourth round of the 2003 NFL draft by the Lions. He increased his rushing total in each of his first three seasons in the league, going from 99 yards in 2003 to 174 yards in 2004 to 349 yards in 2005. Through the 2005 season, Pinner scored five touchdowns, all rushing.

Pinner was cut by the Detroit Lions in 2006 and was quickly claimed by the Minnesota Vikings. He had his best game statistically, which was his first start in the NFL, on December 10, 2006, when he ran for 125 yards and three touchdowns against his former Detroit Lions. On May 1, 2008, he returned to the Detroit Lions. After the 2008 preseason, he was waived by the Lions during final cuts on August 30, 2008.

== Post-retirement ==
Pinner returned to the University of Kentucky in the summer of 2013 to complete his degree in media studies. He graduated in December 2013.
