= Mark Higgs =

American football player (born 1966)

No. 21, 22
- Position: Running back

Personal information
- Born: April 11, 1966 (age 60); Chicago, Illinois, U.S.
- Listed height: 5 ft 7 in (1.70 m)
- Listed weight: 199 lb (90 kg)

Career information
- High school: Owensboro (Owensboro, Kentucky)
- College: Kentucky (1984–1987)
- NFL draft: 1988: 8th round, 205th overall pick

Career history
- Dallas Cowboys (1988); Philadelphia Eagles (1989); Miami Dolphins (1990–1994); Arizona Cardinals (1994–1995)

Awards and highlights
- Second-team All-SEC (1987); Kentucky Wildcats No. 22 retired

Career NFL statistics
- Rushing yards: 2,959
- Rushing average: 3.7
- Rushing touchdowns: 14
- Receptions: 40
- Receiving yards: 303
- Stats at Pro Football Reference

Mark Deyon Higgs (born April 11, 1966) is an American former professional football player who was a running back in the National Football League (NFL) for the Dallas Cowboys, Miami Dolphins, Philadelphia Eagles and Arizona Cardinals. He played college football for the Kentucky Wildcats and was selected by the Cowboys in the eighth round of the 1988 NFL draft.

== Early life ==
Higgs was constantly discouraged from playing football due to his size (5'7", 195 lbs), but still went on to surpass many of the rushing records at Owensboro (Senior) High School, becoming a two-time All-American and All-state selection. As a junior, he had 325 rushing yards against Owensboro Catholic High School.

As a senior, he carried the ball on nearly every play, posting 2,858 rushing yards, 32 touchdowns and nine 200-yard games, including 297 yards against Boone County High School.

He was a three-year starter, finishing as the school's all-time leading rusher by setting state records with 6,721 yards and 75 touchdowns.

== College career ==
Higgs accepted a football scholarship from the University of Kentucky. As a freshman, he was a backup at running back behind George Adams, appearing in 10 games, while registering 476 rushing yards, 5 touchdowns and a school record 6.3 yards per carry, including a single-game average per carry record (29.0, 4–116 against Rutgers University).

The next year, he suffered a right knee injury in spring drills, but was able to return that fall to play in 11 games. He alternated with Marc Logan, tallying 611 rushing yards and 5 touchdowns.

As a junior, he was a part of a platoon of running backs that included Logan and Ivy Joe Hunter, rushing for 527 yards and 5 touchdowns. In his final season, he set school records with 1,278 rushing yards, 6.6-yard average, six 100-yard games and 10 rushing touchdowns.

He recorded the best career average per rushing attempt (5.43) in school history and became the third all-time leading rusher (2,892 yards). He also had two of the five longest scoring plays in the University of Kentucky history - an 85-yard touchdown run against Utah State University in 1987 and an 84-yard touchdown run against Vanderbilt University in 1984.

In 1997, his jersey number was retired. In 2005, he was inducted into the University of Kentucky Hall of Fame. In 2008, he was inducted into the Kentucky Pro Football Hall of Fame.

== Professional career ==
=== Dallas Cowboys ===
Higgs was selected by the Dallas Cowboys in the eighth round (205th overall) of the 1988 NFL draft, after dropping because he was seen as being too small to play professional football. In training camp he passed Darryl Clack on the depth chart as Herschel Walker's backup, but didn't have any opportunities to see the field during the regular season.

=== Philadelphia Eagles ===
On March 2, 1989, he signed with the Philadelphia Eagles as a Plan B free agent. He finished the year with one start, 49 carries for 184 yards and 3 receptions for 9 yards.

=== Miami Dolphins ===
Higgs joined the Dolphins as a Plan B free agent prior to the 1990 season, where he was initially a fourth-string running back and special teams player. The next year, he was named the starter, replacing an injured Sammie Smith and would keep the role even after Smith recovered from his injury.

During the 1993 season, Higgs was replaced as the team's starting running back by Terry Kirby. Higgs had led the team in rushing for the three consecutive seasons with totals of 905, 915 and 693 yards, a consecutive feat that had only been matched by Larry Csonka, Karim Abdul-Jabbar and Ronnie Brown. In 1994, he accepted a pay cut to remain with the Dolphins, but was eventually released on November 15.

=== Arizona Cardinals ===
On November 17, 1994, he signed as a free agent with the Arizona Cardinals. The next year, he played in only one game, after a hit resulted in a back injury that kept him out for 13 weeks. He was waived on December 1, 1995, and retired shortly afterwards.

== Career highlights ==
=== Owensboro (Senior) High School, 1980–1984 ===
- All-time leading rusher, (6,721)
- Yards rushing - season (2,858 in 1983)
- Most rushing touchdowns, career (75)
- Total touchdowns - career (75)

=== University of Kentucky, 1984–1987 ===
- #1 Best Average Per Rushing Attempt, Career (5.43)
- #3 Most Rushing Yards, Career (2,892)
- #9 Most All-Purpose Yardage (Career), 3,387
- Inducted into the University of Kentucky Hall of Fame in 2005

=== Miami Dolphins ===
- Leading rusher, 1991–1993
- #9 NFL leading rusher, 1992 (915)
- #8 Most 100-yard rushing Games (8)
- Longest blocked punt return for a TD (19 yards)
- Only the second Dolphins player (out of three total) to lead in rushing for three consecutive seasons (after Larry Czonka and before Karim Abdul-Jabbar)

== Personal life ==
Higgs began his own business, M and T Transportation, Inc, in 1998. He joined the Miami Dolphins Alumni Association's advisory board in 2002, and is a frequent visitor to the Dolphins' radio show. In 2007, he became the running backs coach for Miami Central High School.

He is one of three family members to hold the top scoring records at Owensboro High School. He is the younger brother of retired Cleveland Cavaliers/Denver Nuggets guard Kenny Higgs, who is the all-time leading scorer of the Red Devils' basketball team (1,833). His cousin Dwight Higgs, a former Euroleague basketball guard and three time Division II All-American (Kentucky Wesleyan), holds the OHS record for most points scored in a single season (887), and is the #7 overall scorer. Dwight's younger brother Bobby is also a top 20 career scorer at Owensboro High, ranking at #15.
