= 2005 SEC Championship Game =

- Conference Championship
- 2005 SEC Championship logo
Georgia Bulldogs	LSU Tigers
(9–2)	(10–1)
34	14
Head coach: Mark Richt	Head coach: Les Miles
AP / Coaches / BCS; 13 / 13 / 13	AP / Coaches / BCS; 3 / 3 / 4
	1	2	3	4	Total
Georgia	14	7	3	10	34
LSU	0	7	0	7	14
- Date: December 3, 2005
- Season: 2005
- Stadium: Georgia Dome
- Location: Atlanta, Georgia
- MVP: QB D.J Shockley, Georgia
- Favorite: LSU by 2½
- National anthem: Georgia Redcoat Marching Band; Tiger Marching Band
- Referee: Rocky Goode
- Halftime show: Georgia Redcoat Marching Band; Tiger Marching Band
- Attendance: 73,717

United States TV coverage
- Network: CBS
- Announcers: Verne Lundquist & Todd Blackledge

2005 Southeastern Conference football standings
	Conf.			Overall
Team	W		L	W		L
Eastern Division
No. 10 Georgia x$	6	–	2	10	–	3
South Carolina	5	–	3	7	–	5
No. 12 Florida	5	–	3	9	–	3
Vanderbilt	3	–	5	5	–	6
Tennessee	3	–	5	5	–	6
Kentucky	2	–	6	3	–	8
Western Division
No. 5 LSU xy	7	–	1	11	–	2
No. 14 Auburn x	7	–	1	9	–	3
No. 8 Alabama	6	–	2	10	–	2
Arkansas	2	–	6	4	–	7
Mississippi State	1	–	7	3	–	8
Ole Miss	1	–	7	3	–	8
Championship: Georgia 34, LSU 14
$ – BCS representative as conference champion; x – Division champion/co-champions; y – Championship game participant; Alabama had all victories vacated by the NCAA in 2010. As such, the official record for Alabama is 0–2 (0–2).; Rankings from AP Poll

The 2005 Dr. Pepper SEC Championship Game was played on December 3, 2005 in the Georgia Dome in Atlanta. The game determined the 2005 football champion of the Southeastern Conference. The Georgia Bulldogs, winners of the Eastern division of the SEC, defeated the LSU Tigers, who won the Western division, by a score of 34–14. This was the second time the two teams have met in the conference championship game. The first time was in 2003 when LSU defeated Georgia by the score 34–13.

== Selection process ==
The SEC Championship Game matches up the winner of the Eastern and Western divisions of the Southeastern Conference. The game was first played in 1992, when the conference expanded from 10 to 12 teams with the addition of Arkansas and South Carolina. The SEC was the first conference in college football to have a conference championship game. By 2005, four other conferences had conference championship games (Big 12, ACC, CUSA & MAC).

== Regular season ==
=== SEC East ===
The battle for the SEC East was a three-way battle for the entire conference season among the Georgia Bulldogs, Florida Gators, and South Carolina Gamecocks. The Georgia Bulldogs entered the season with high hopes and rattled off a 5–0 conference record (South Carolina, Mississippi State, Tennessee, Vanderbilt, and Arkansas) before heading to Jacksonville for the annual battle with the Florida Gators. Georgia was ranked #4 in both polls, and a win would have sealed the SEC East crown. But, with starting quarterback D.J. Shockley sidelined with an injury suffered in the Homecoming victory against Arkansas, Joe Tereshinski, III the Gators prevailed, 14–10 and dealt the Bulldogs their first loss of the season. Brandon Coutu missed two field goals late in the game which proved the difference in the game.

Again, with the SEC East crown on the line, the Bulldogs played the Auburn Tigers at home in a series which traditionally favors the road-team. Auburn won the game on a John Vaughn 20-yard field goal with six seconds remaining, 31–30. On the third attempt to punch their ticket to Atlanta, the Bulldogs defeated Kentucky 45–13 on Senior Day. A loss to the Wildcats would have created a three-way tie (Florida and South Carolina) for the SEC East Crown. Georgia's win clinched their 5th SEC East crown, and 3rd trip to the title game.

=== SEC West ===
The SEC West race was decided in Baton Rouge on October 22 when the LSU Tigers defeated the Auburn Tigers 20–17 in overtime. LSU had one conference loss coming into the game (an overtime loss against Tennessee) and Auburn was unblemished. Both teams remained tied with one conference loss through the rest of the season. Auburn was awarded its 5th Divisional Title, LSU its 5th as well, and LSU represented the SEC West in the title game for the 3rd time.

== Game summary ==
The Bulldogs' senior quarterback D. J. Shockley threw for 112 yards and two touchdowns while also running for a score. After LSU QB JaMarcus Russell left the game in the third quarter with an injury, backup Matt Flynn threw an interception returned for the touchdown by Tim Jennings to seal Georgia's 34–14 victory.

=== Scoring summary ===
Scoring summary

Quarter	Time	Drive			Team	Scoring information	Score	
Quarter	Time	Plays	Yards	TOP	Team	Scoring information	UGA	LSU
1	10:19	1	45	0:08	UGA	Sean Bailey 45-yard touchdown reception from D. J. Shockley, Brandon Coutu kick good	7	0
1	6:12	6	51	2:34	UGA	Sean Bailey 29-yard touchdown reception from D. J. Shockley, Brandon Coutu kick good	14	0
2	13:53	14	80	7:19	LSU	JaMarcus Russell 1-yard touchdown run, Colt David kick good	14	7
2	8:23	3	15	1:21	UGA	D. J. Shockley 7-yard touchdown run, Brandon Coutu kick good	21	7
3	9:53	9	62	3:49	UGA	21-yard field goal by Brandon Coutu	24	7
4	14:40	11	40	5:35	UGA	51-yard field goal by Brandon Coutu	27	7
4	14:18				UGA	Interception returned 19 yards for touchdown by Tim Jennings, Brandon Coutu kick good	34	7
4	5:38	9	79	3:59	LSU	Dwayne Bowe 19-yard touchdown reception from Matt Flynn, Colt David kick good	34	14
"TOP" = time of possession. For other American football terms, see Glossary of American football.							34	14

=== Game statistics ===
	1	2	3	4	Total
No. 13 Bulldogs	14	7	3	10	34
No. 3 Tigers	0	7	0	7	14

Statistics	Georgia	LSU
First downs	16	18
Plays–yards	54–250	66–230
Rushes–yards	42–138	36–74
Passing yards	112	156
Passing: comp–att–int	6–12–0	14–30–2
Time of possession	19:11	17:29

Team	Category	Player	Statistics
Georgia	Passing	D. J. Shockley	6/12, 112 yds, 2 TD
Georgia	Rushing	Thomas Brown	14 car, 62 yds
Georgia	Receiving	Sean Bailey	2 rec, 74 yds, 2 TD
LSU	Passing	JaMarcus Russell	11/19, 120 yds, 1 INT
LSU	Rushing	Shyrone Carey	10 car, 43 yds
LSU	Receiving	Dwayne Bowe	5 rec, 74 yds, 1 TD
