= 2005 Vanderbilt Commodores football team =

American college football season

2005 Vanderbilt Commodores football
- Conference: Southeastern Conference
- Eastern Division
- Record: 5–6 (3–5 SEC)
- Head coach: Bobby Johnson (4th season)
- Offensive coordinator: Ted Cain (4th season)
- Offensive scheme: Multiple
- Defensive coordinator: Bruce Fowler (4th season)
- Base defense: 4–3
- Captains: Jay Cutler; Moses Osemwegie
- Home stadium: Vanderbilt Stadium

2005 Southeastern Conference football standings
	Conf.			Overall
Team	W		L	W		L
Eastern Division
No. 10 Georgia x$	6	–	2	10	–	3
South Carolina	5	–	3	7	–	5
No. 12 Florida	5	–	3	9	–	3
Vanderbilt	3	–	5	5	–	6
Tennessee	3	–	5	5	–	6
Kentucky	2	–	6	3	–	8
Western Division
No. 5 LSU xy	7	–	1	11	–	2
No. 14 Auburn x	7	–	1	9	–	3
No. 8 Alabama	6	–	2	10	–	2
Arkansas	2	–	6	4	–	7
Mississippi State	1	–	7	3	–	8
Ole Miss	1	–	7	3	–	8
Championship: Georgia 34, LSU 14
$ – BCS representative as conference champion; x – Division champion/co-champions; y – Championship game participant; Alabama had all victories vacated by the NCAA in 2010. As such, the official record for Alabama is 0–2 (0–2).; Rankings from AP Poll

The 2005 Vanderbilt Commodores football team represented Vanderbilt University as a member of the Eastern Division of the Southeastern Conference (SEC) during the 2005 NCAA Division I-A football season. Led fourth-year head coach Bobby Johnson, Commodores compiled an overall record of 5–6 with a mark of 3–5 in conference play, tying for fourth place in the SEC's Eastern Division. The team played home games at Vanderbilt Stadium in Nashville, Tennessee.

Vanderbilt won the first four games of the season, and looked to improve to 5–0 for the first time since the 1940s with a win over Middle Tennessee on October 1. The game came down to the last play of the game, but a failed Vanderbilt field goal attempt allowed Middle Tennessee to come away with the win. The Commodores proceeded to drop its next five games and fall out of bowl eligibility. The season ended on a high note as Vanderbilt recorded its first win over the rival Tennessee Volunteers since 1982 and the program's first win at Tennessee's Neyland Stadium since 1975 by defeating the Volunteers, 28–24, on November 19. Vanderbilt's historic victory eliminated Tennessee from bowl eligibility. The Commodores offense scored 299 points while the defense allowed 321 points on the season.

This was quarterback Jay Cutler's senior year. The leading receiver for the Commodores was Earl Bennett. Other members of the team included Jonathan Goff, Thomas Welch, and Chris Williams. Cutler was named SEC Offensive Player of the Year. He was selected 11th overall by the Denver Broncos in the 2006 NFL draft the following spring, becoming the first Vanderbilt player to be drafted in the first round of the NFL draft since Will Wolford in 1986.

== Schedule ==
Date	Time	Opponent	Site	TV	Result	Attendance
September 1	6:00 p.m.	at Wake Forest*	Groves Stadium; Winston-Salem, NC	ESPNU	W 24–20	25,384
September 10	6:00 p.m.	at Arkansas	Donald W. Reynolds Razorback Stadium; Fayetteville, AR		W 28–24	68,215
September 17	11:30 a.m.	Ole Miss	Vanderbilt Stadium; Nashville, TN (rivalry)	JPS	W 31–23	34,837
September 24	6:00 p.m.	Richmond*	Vanderbilt Stadium; Nashville, TN		W 37–13	38,446
October 1	6:00 p.m.	Middle Tennessee State*^{†}	Vanderbilt Stadium; Nashville, TN	ESPNGP	L 15–17	37,257
October 8	6:00 p.m.	No. 11 LSU	Vanderbilt Stadium; Nashville, TN	ESPN2	L 6–34	37,309
October 15	6:15 p.m.	No. 5 Georgia	Vanderbilt Stadium; Nashville, TN (rivalry)	ESPN2	L 17–34	38,822
October 22	2:30 p.m.	at South Carolina	Williams–Brice Stadium; Columbia, SC	ESPNGP	L 28–35	76,427
November 5	6:15 p.m.	at No. 13 Florida	Ben Hill Griffin Stadium; Gainesville, FL	ESPN2	L 42–49 ^{2OT}	90,140
November 12	1:00 p.m.	Kentucky	Vanderbilt Stadium; Nashville, TN (rivalry)		L 43–48	29,506
November 19	11:30 a.m.	at Tennessee	Neyland Stadium; Knoxville, TN (rivalry)	JPS	W 28–24	107,487
*Non-conference game; ^{†}Homecoming; Rankings from AP Poll released prior to the game; All times are in Central time

== Team players drafted into the NFL ==
Player	Position	Round	Pick	NFL club
Jay Cutler	Quarterback	1	11	Denver Broncos
