= Andre' Woodson =

American football player and coach (born 1984)

No. 3
- Position: Quarterback

Personal information
- Born: April 25, 1984 (age 42); Fort Lewis, Washington, U.S.
- Listed height: 6 ft 4 in (1.93 m)
- Listed weight: 230 lb (104 kg)

Career information
- High school: North Hardin (Radcliff, Kentucky)
- College: Kentucky
- NFL draft: 2008: 6th round, 198th overall pick

Career history

Playing
- New York Giants (2008–2009)*; Washington Redskins (2009)*; Hartford Colonials (2010)*
- * Offseason or practice squad member only

Coaching
- Kentucky Wildcats (2011–2012) Graduate assistant; Morehead State (2013) Wide receivers coach

Awards and highlights
- 2× Second-team All-SEC (2006, 2007); 2× Music City Bowl MVP (2006, 2007)
- Stats at Pro Football Reference

Andre' Chandler Woodson Jr. (born April 25, 1984) is an American former professional football quarterback and college coach. He was selected by the New York Giants in the sixth round of the 2008 NFL draft. Woodson played collegiately at the University of Kentucky.

== Early life ==
Born on post in Fort Lewis, Washington where his mother, Robin Woodson, was stationed in the Army with his father (Andre W.) Woodson grew up a military brat, moving from post to post with his mother after his parents divorced when he was the age of two. He was raised by his mother as she continued her Army service, eventually arriving in Radcliff, Kentucky, in 1994. He attended local schools nearby, Radcliff Middle School and North Hardin High School, both in Radcliff, Kentucky (Hardin County Kentucky, located near Fort Knox, Kentucky), where he lettered in basketball and football, which eventually led to his being noticed for his football potential by the University of Kentucky.

== College career ==
In 2003, Woodson was recruited to Kentucky. During his freshman season, Woodson served as a backup to Shane Boyd, and appeared in seven games (including one start). For the 2005 season, Woodson was named as the starting quarterback. The Wildcats ended 2005 with a 3–8 record, with Woodson completing nearly 58 percent of his passes, while throwing for 1,644 yards.

After the 2006 spring practice, it appeared Woodson would lose his position to his backup, Curtis Pulley. Spurred by this, Woodson started spending more time lifting weights, began leading the team in practice, and soon became the choice for starting quarterback. The 2006 season, Woodson's junior season, was a breakout season, with Woodson leading the Wildcats to a 7–5 regular season, and their first bowl win in 22 years, in the Music City Bowl. He led both his team and the SEC in passing yards with 3,515, and became only the second Kentucky quarterback to throw 30 or more touchdowns in a single season.

On September 22, 2007, Woodson broke Trent Dilfer's all-time NCAA record of 271 consecutive pass attempts without an interception against the Arkansas Razorbacks. The streak ended, however, when Woodson threw his first interception in 325 attempts on September 29, 2007, against Florida Atlantic University. Against Florida State in the 2007 Music City Bowl, Woodson broke Danny Wuerffel's SEC record for passing touchdowns in one season. Woodson threw 40 for the season, passing Wuerffel's record by one. He also broke Jared Lorenzen's UK record of 78 career touchdown passes.

=== College statistics ===
Season	GP	Passing						Rushing			
Season	GP	Comp	Att	Yds	TD	Int	Rtg	Att	Yds	Avg	TD
2004	7	54	88	492	2	1	109.26	36	-27	-0.7	0
2005	11	146	253	1,644	6	6	110.16	57	-133	-2.3	1
2006	13	295	452	3,515	31	7	146.84	70	-137	-1.9	1
2007	13	327	518	3,709	40	11	144.51	69	-193	-2.7	3
Career	44	822	1,311	9,360	81	25	134.32	232	-490	-2.1	5

== Professional career ==
=== New York Giants ===
On April 27, 2008, Woodson was selected in the sixth round (198th pick overall) to the New York Giants starting his professional career. On August 30, the Giants waived Woodson during final cuts. He was re-signed to the team's practice squad a day later, where he remained until his release on October 23. Woodson was later re-signed to the practice squad on October 27, 2008.

Following the 2008 season, Woodson was re-signed to a future contract on January 12, 2009. He was waived on September 5, 2009.

=== Washington Redskins ===
On September 6, 2009, Woodson was signed by the Washington Redskins to their practice squad. He was released on November 24, 2009.

=== Hartford Colonials ===
Woodson was signed by the Hartford Colonials of the United Football League (UFL) in spring 2010. On September 1, 2010, Woodson was waived by the Colonials.

== Coaching career ==
=== Kentucky Wildcats ===
Woodson rejoined the Kentucky Wildcats as a graduate assistant in the summer of 2011.

=== Morehead State ===
Woodson left Kentucky and joined Morehead State as a wide receivers coach in January 2013. He left the staff in December 2013.

== Personal life ==
His first child, André III, was born on his 29th birthday in 2013.

Woodson currently works as a PR and Community Specialist for Amazon.
