= 2005 Tennessee Volunteers football team =

American college football season

2005 Tennessee Volunteers football
- Conference: Southeastern Conference
- Eastern Division
- Record: 5–6 (3–5 SEC)
- Head coach: Phillip Fulmer (13th season)
- Offensive coordinator: Randy Sanders (7th season)
- Offensive scheme: Pro-style
- Defensive coordinator: John Chavis (11th season)
- Base defense: Multiple 4–3
- Home stadium: Neyland Stadium

2005 Southeastern Conference football standings
	Conf.			Overall
Team	W		L	W		L
Eastern Division
No. 10 Georgia x$	6	–	2	10	–	3
South Carolina	5	–	3	7	–	5
No. 12 Florida	5	–	3	9	–	3
Vanderbilt	3	–	5	5	–	6
Tennessee	3	–	5	5	–	6
Kentucky	2	–	6	3	–	8
Western Division
No. 5 LSU xy	7	–	1	11	–	2
No. 14 Auburn x	7	–	1	9	–	3
No. 8 Alabama	6	–	2	10	–	2
Arkansas	2	–	6	4	–	7
Mississippi State	1	–	7	3	–	8
Ole Miss	1	–	7	3	–	8
Championship: Georgia 34, LSU 14
$ – BCS representative as conference champion; x – Division champion/co-champions; y – Championship game participant; Alabama had all victories vacated by the NCAA in 2010. As such, the official record for Alabama is 0–2 (0–2).; Rankings from AP Poll

The 2005 Tennessee Volunteers (variously "Tennessee", "UT", or the "Vols") represented the University of Tennessee in the 2005 NCAA Division I-A football season. Playing as a member of the Southeastern Conference (SEC) Eastern Division, the team was led by head coach Phillip Fulmer, in his thirteenth full year, and played their home games at Neyland Stadium in Knoxville, Tennessee. They finished the season with a record of five wins and six losses (5–6 overall, 3–5 in the SEC), and failed to qualify for a bowl game for the first time during Fulmer's tenure as head coach and the first time overall since 1988.

Tennessee entered their 2005 season ranked as the number three team in the nation and as a favorite to win the Eastern Division and compete for the SEC championship.

== Schedule ==
Date	Time	Opponent	Rank	Site	TV	Result	Attendance
September 3	12:30 pm	UAB*	No. 3	Neyland Stadium; Knoxville, Tennessee	JPS	W 17–10	107,529
September 17	8:00 pm	at No. 6 Florida	No. 5	Ben Hill Griffin Stadium; Gainesville, Florida (Third Saturday in September)	CBS	L 7–16	90,716
September 26	7:30 pm	at No. 4 LSU	No. 10	Tiger Stadium; Baton Rouge, Louisiana	ESPN2	W 30–27 ^{OT}	91,986
October 1	12:30 pm	Ole Miss	No. 10	Neyland Stadium; Knoxville, Tennessee (rivalry)	JPS	W 27–10	107,709
October 8	3:30 pm	No. 5 Georgia	No. 8	Neyland Stadium; Knoxville, Tennessee (rivalry)	CBS	L 14–27	108,470
October 22	3:30 pm	at No. 5 Alabama	No. 17	Bryant–Denny Stadium; Tuscaloosa, Alabama (Third Saturday in October)	CBS	L 3–6 ‡	81,018
October 29	7:45 pm	South Carolina	No. 23	Neyland Stadium; Knoxville, Tennessee (rivalry)	ESPN2	L 15–16	107,716
November 5	2:30 pm	at No. 8 Notre Dame*		Notre Dame Stadium; Notre Dame, Indiana	NBC	L 21–41	80,795
November 12	2:00 pm	Memphis*^{†}		Neyland Stadium; Knoxville, Tennessee	PPV	W 20–16	106,647
November 19	12:30 pm	Vanderbilt		Neyland Stadium; Knoxville, Tennessee (rivalry)	JPS	L 24–28	107,487
November 26	12:30 pm	at Kentucky		Commonwealth Stadium; Lexington, Kentucky (Battle for the Barrel)	JPS	W 27–8	61,924
*Non-conference game; ^{†}Homecoming; Rankings from AP Poll released prior to the game; All times are in Eastern time

‡ As part of their penalty for NCAA violations, Alabama has retroactively vacated its 2005 victory over Tennessee. However, the penalty to vacate victories does not result in a loss (or forfeiture) of the affected game or award a victory to the opponent, therefore Tennessee still considers the game a loss in their official records.

== Rankings ==
Ranking movements Legend: ██ Increase in ranking ██ Decrease in ranking — = Not ranked RV = Received votes т = Tied with team above or below
	Week															
Poll	Pre	1	2	3	4	5	6	7	8	9	10	11	12	13	14	Final
AP	3	6	5	10	10	8	17	17	23	—	—	—	—	—	—	—
Coaches	3	4	4т	11	9	7	18	18	25	RV	—	—	—	—	—	—
Harris	Not released				12	9	21	18	25	RV	—	—	—	—	—	Not released
BCS	Not released							19	—	—	—	—	—	—	—	Not released

== Roster ==
2005 Tennessee Volunteers football team roster
Players
Coaches
Offense

Pos.	#	Name	Class
QB	8	Jonathan Crompton	Fr
WR	9	Bret Smith	Jr
QB	10	Erik Ainge	So
WR	11	Slick Shelley	Fr
WR	12	Lucas Taylor	Fr
WR	13	Chris Hannon	Sr
QB	14	Bo Hardegree	So
G	78	Ramon Foster	Fr

Defense

Pos.	#	Name	Class
DB	18	Jason Allen	Sr
DT	92	Justin Harrell	Jr
DE	98	Parys Haralson	Sr
QB	11	Dennis Abram	Jr

Special teams

Pos.	#	Name	Class

Head coach

- Phillip Fulmer

Coordinators/assistant coaches

- Randy Sanders – Offensive coordinator/quarterbacks
- Trooper Taylor – Running backs/assistant head coach
- Pat Washington – Wide receivers
- Greg Adkins – Tight ends/assistant offensive line/recruiting coordinator
- Jimmy Ray Stephens – Offensive line
- John Chavis – Defensive coordinator/associate head coach/linebackers
- Dan Brooks – Defensive line
- Larry Slade – Defensive backs
- Steve Caldwell – Special teams/defensive ends
- Jason Michael – Graduate assistant
- Jay Graham – Graduate assistant

Legend

- (C) Team captain
- (S) Suspended
- (I) Ineligible
- Injured
- Redshirt

Roster

== Team players drafted into the NFL ==
Player	Position	Round	Pick	NFL club
Jason Allen	Cornerback	1	16	Miami Dolphins
Parys Haralson	Defensive end	5	140	San Francisco 49ers
Omar Gaither	Linebacker	5	168	Philadelphia Eagles
Jesse Mahelona	Defensive tackle	5	169	Tennessee Titans
Kevin Simon	Linebacker	7	250	Washington Redskins
