= Keenan Burton =

American football player (born 1984)

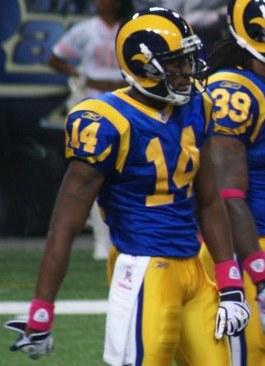
- Burton with the St. Louis Rams in 2009

No. 14
- Position: Wide receiver

Personal information
- Born: October 29, 1984 (age 42); Louisville, Kentucky, U.S.
- Listed height: 6 ft 0 in (1.83 m)
- Listed weight: 202 lb (92 kg)

Career information
- High school: duPont Manual (Louisville)
- College: Kentucky
- NFL draft: 2008: 4th round, 128th overall pick

Career history
- St. Louis Rams (2008–2009)

Awards and highlights
- First-team All-SEC (2006)

Career NFL statistics
- Receptions: 38
- Receiving yards: 425
- Receiving touchdowns: 1
- Stats at Pro Football Reference

Keenan Burton (born October 29, 1984) is an American former professional football player who was a wide receiver in the National Football League (NFL). He was selected by the St. Louis Rams in the fourth round of the 2008 NFL draft. He played college football for the Kentucky Wildcats.

== Early life ==
Burton attended DuPont Manual Magnet High School in Louisville, Kentucky and was a letterman in football for the Crimsons. At the school he played many positions from quarterback to safety. He started the last three of his four seasons with the team, lining up mostly at quarterback on offense, although he did see some action as a receiver, running back, and kick returner. He helped the school attend four Class-AAAA State Playoffs. Burton carried the ball 274 times for 1,634 yards (6.0-yard average) and 25 touchdowns during his career. He completed 81 of 226 passes (35.8%) for 1,605 yards and 17 scores. He also recorded 98 tackles, along with 30 pass deflections and 10 interceptions, returning two of those picks for touchdowns, adding another score on a punt return. Burton was named the MVP of the Kentucky/Tennessee High School All-Star game in 2003.

== College career ==
Burton attended college at the University of Kentucky and participated in their football program while attending the school for a degree in Agricultural communications. Burton turned down offers from Northwestern University, Indiana University, Marshall University, University of Louisville, Miami University (Ohio) and Boston College.

During his tenure on the football team in the 2004 and 2005 seasons, he only played in 8 games. Prior to the 2004 season opener, Burton suffered a left wrist fracture and played in the first game before being sidelined by the coaching staff. In 2005, he suffered a foot injury that resulted in two surgeries.

Burton played in 45 games total in his career at Kentucky as a wide receiver and kick returner. He ranks fourth in school history in receptions, third in receiving yards, second in touchdowns, and third in all purpose yards, and was the fifth player to amass over 4,000 all purpose yards.

=== 2006 ===
College Receiving Stats

Year	G	Rec	Yds	Avg.	TD	Lng
Freshman	1	2	13	6.5	0	7
Sophomore	7	24	365	15.2	2	53
Junior	13	77	1036	13.5	12	73
Senior	12	66	741	11.2	9	51

In 2006, Keenan flourished since he was not plagued with injuries for the first time since 2003. Burton led the Wildcats with 77 receptions for 1,036 yards and 12 touchdowns. He led the Wildcats in kick returns, averaging 24.7 yards per return. He had one kickoff return for a touchdown in the team's season opener in Louisville. In his kick returning duties he ranked second in the SEC. He was the third player ever in the school's history to record over 1,000 yards receiving in a single season and his 12 touchdowns ranked 2nd on the single season chart for the school.

The team played in the Music City Bowl and Burton caught only 5 passes for 30 yards in the game. However, Kentucky went on to win the game.

=== 2007 ===
Burton began his senior season with the Wildcats strong. In the first five games of the season he compiled 422 receiving yards and 5 touchdowns. However, struck by flu-like symptoms and sprains in the knee and ankle, his playing time was limited. He still managed to be second on the team for the season in receiving with 685 yards and 9 touchdowns.

The team earned another trip to the Music City Bowl and again Burton was limited in his performance. He caught 7 passes for 56 yards. The team won the game just as they did the previous year despite the low performance.

Burton skipped the Senior Bowl to undergo arthroscopic surgery on his knee following the completion of the season.

== Professional career ==
Burton, along with Kentucky teammate Andre Woodson, was invited to the 2008 NFL Scouting Combine in Indianapolis, Indiana. Burton was a top performer in the vertical jump, broad jump, 3 cone drill, 20-yard shuttle, and 60 yard shuttle events at the combine. He placed first in the vertical jump with a 38.5 in. high jump. Burton also placed third in the 60-yard shuttle with a time of 11.36 seconds.

Pre-draft measurables
Height	Weight	40-yard dash	10-yard split	20-yard split	20-yard shuttle	Three-cone drill	Vertical jump	Broad jump	Bench press	Wonderlic
6 ft 0 1/2 in (1.84 m)	201 lb (91 kg)	4.44 s	1.50 s	2.55 s	4.20 s	6.77 s	38 1/2 in (0.98 m)	10 ft 5 in (3.18 m)	10 reps	14
All values from NFL Combine.

Burton was selected 128th overall in the fourth round of the 2008 NFL draft by the St. Louis Rams. He signed a three-year, $1.459 million contract with the Rams on July 4, 2008. The deal included a $309,000 signing bonus. Burton finished his rookie season with 13 receptions for 172 yards and one touchdown.

In 2009 Burton entered the Rams' Week 10 game against New Orleans as the team's leading receiver with 25 catches. However, his season ended in the first quarter with a knee injury when he landed awkwardly on a long pass route. "It's a patella injury," His coach, Steve Spagnuolo said. "It's a pretty bad injury."

On September 7, 2010, Burton was released by the St. Louis Rams to make room for wide receiver Mark Clayton on the 53-man roster. Burton played in 22 games as a Ram, including seven starts, totaling 38 receptions for 425 yards and one touchdown.
