= Sonny Collins =

American football player (born 1953)

No. 41
- Position: Running back

Personal information
- Born: January 17, 1953 (age 73); Madisonville, Kentucky, U.S.
- Listed height: 6 ft 1 in (1.85 m)
- Listed weight: 196 lb (89 kg)

Career information
- High school: Madisonville North Hopkins
- College: Kentucky
- NFL draft: 1976: 2nd round, 36th overall pick

Career history
- Atlanta Falcons (1976)

Awards and highlights
- Second-team All-American (1973); SEC Player of the Year (1973); 3× First-team All-SEC (1973, 1974, 1975)

Career NFL statistics
- Rushing attempts: 91
- Rushing yards: 319
- Receptions: 4
- Receiving yards: 37
- Stats at Pro Football Reference

Alfred Eugene "Sonny" Collins (born January 17, 1953) is an American former professional football player who was a running back in the National Football League (NFL). He was selected by the Atlanta Falcons in the second round of the 1976 NFL draft. He played college football for the Kentucky Wildcats.

== College career ==
Collins rushed for 3,835 yards with 26 touchdowns during his college career and was the 1973 SEC Player of the Year. He finished his collegiate career at Kentucky as the all-time leading rusher. The record would stand for 43 years until Benny Snell surpassed it in 2019.

In 2012, he was named an SEC Football Legend.

== NFL career ==
Collins was selected by the Atlanta Falcons in the second round (#36 overall) of the 1976 NFL draft. He only played for a year before retiring with a career ending knee injury.
