= Derrick Locke =

American gridiron football player (born 1989)

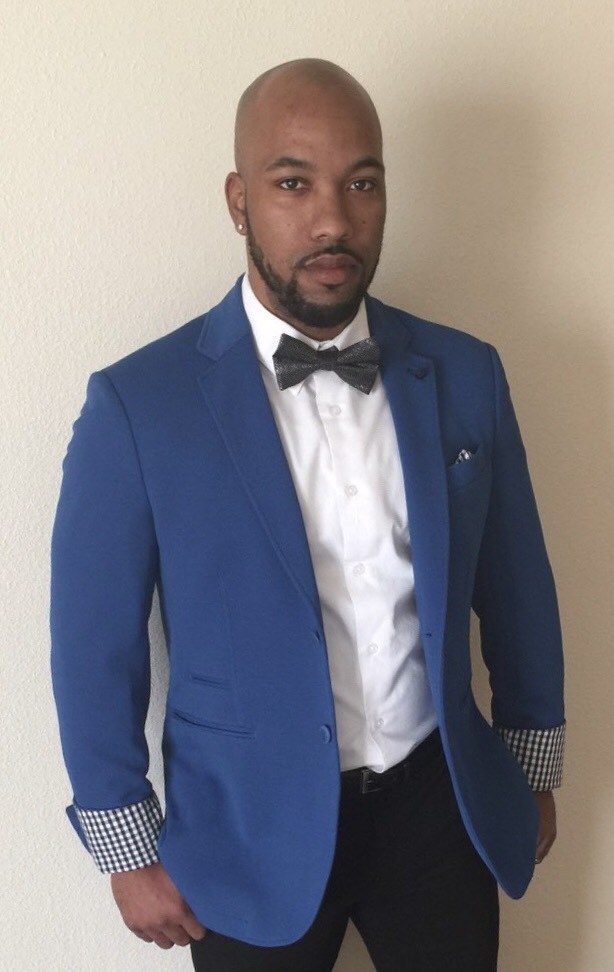
- Locke at age 29

No. 33
- Position: Running back

Personal information
- Born: May 30, 1989 (age 37); Oklahoma City, Oklahoma, U.S.
- Listed height: 5 ft 8 in (1.73 m)
- Listed weight: 188 lb (85 kg)

Career information
- College: Kentucky
- NFL draft: 2011: undrafted

Career history
- Philadelphia Eagles (2011)*; Calgary Stampeders (2012)
- * Offseason or practice squad member only

Awards and highlights
- Second-team All-SEC (2009)
- Stats at Pro Football Reference

Derrick Locke (born May 30, 1989) is an American former football running back. He was signed by the Philadelphia Eagles as an undrafted free agent in 2011. He played college football at Kentucky.

== Early life ==
Locke was a four-year starter on his high school football team in Hugo, Oklahoma – as a running back in his freshman and senior years and a quarterback in his sophomore and junior years. During his senior year, he rushed for 3,250 yards and scored 51 touchdowns. He was named Most Valuable Player of Oklahoma Class AAA and named all-state, all-district, and the Red River Valley Player of the Year.

Locke was also a track athlete, competing in the long jump. He set a state record and had the longest jump in the nation his senior year, with a leap of 25 feet, 4.75 inches.

== College career ==
In 2007, Locke started on the University of Kentucky football team as a freshman and earned the team's Most Outstanding First-Year Player Award as picked by the coaches. He was the team's second-leading rusher with 521 yards and paced the team in rushing touchdowns (five).

In 2009, he led the team and ranked sixth in the SEC in rushing with 907 yards. He was named second-team All-SEC by the Associated Press as an all-purpose player. Against the Louisville Cardinals, he had 191 kickoff return yards, breaking the UK single-game record. He also became the first player in school history to have two 100-yard kickoff returns in a career.

Locke ranked 10th on the UK career rushing list heading into his senior season.

As a track-and-field athlete, he set the Kentucky school outdoor long jump record in 2008 at 25 feet, 3.25 inches.

== Professional career ==
Locke agreed to terms with the Minnesota Vikings as an undrafted free agent following the end of the NFL lockout on July 26, 2011, but failed his physical the following day due to a neck injury and was not signed. He signed as an undrafted free agent with the Philadelphia Eagles on July 28, but was waived on August 26.

Locke was signed by the Calgary Stampeders on June 18, 2012.
