= Craig Yeast =

American football player and coach (born 1976)

No. 3, 84, 5
- Positions: Wide receiver, kick returner

Personal information
- Born: November 20, 1976 (age 49); Danville, Kentucky, U.S.

Career information
- College: Kentucky
- NFL draft: 1999: 4th round, 98th overall pick

Career history
- 1999–2000: Cincinnati Bengals
- 2001: New York Jets
- 2002–2006: Hamilton Tiger-Cats
- 2006: Saskatchewan Roughriders

Awards and highlights
- First-team All-SEC (1998); Second-team All-SEC (1997)
- Stats at Pro Football Reference

Craig Nelson Yeast (born November 20, 1976) is an American football coach and former player who is the head football coach at Mercer County Senior High School in Harrodsburg, Kentucky. He is the former head coach at Kentucky Wesleyan College. Yeast played professionally as a wide receiver and kick returner in the National Football League (NFL) with the Cincinnati Bengals and the New York Jets and in the Canadian Football League (CFL) with the Hamilton Tiger-Cats and Saskatchewan Roughriders. He played college football for the Kentucky Wildcats.

== Early life ==
Yeast played quarterback and running back for Harrodsburg High School in Harrodsburg, Kentucky. The school merged with Mercer County Senior High School in 2006.

== College career ==
Yeast played college football at the University of Kentucky from 1995 to 1998. When he graduated, Yeast was the all-time leader in career receptions in the history of the Southeastern Conference, with 208 catches, and was second in career receiving yards with 2,899. In 1998, he returned three kickoffs and one punt for touchdowns. As a senior, he was a third-team All-American according to College Football News, and was also a consensus All-Southeastern Conference first-team selection and a semi-finalist for the Fred Biletnikoff Award. Yeast was also a member of the Phi Beta Sigma fraternity.

== Professional career ==
Yeast was the third pick of the fourth round in the 1999 NFL draft. He played for the Cincinnati Bengals and the New York Jets. His best NFL season came with Cincinnati in 2000 when he caught 24 passes for 301 yards (12.5 average) and had one rushing attempt for 15 yards.

In four seasons with the Hamilton Tiger-Cats of the Canadian Football League, Yeast had 158 pass receptions for 2,706 yards (17.1 yards per catch) and 13 touchdowns. In 2004 Yeast had 59 catches for 1,184 yards (20.1 average) and 8 touchdowns. In 2005 Yeast had 65 catches for 1,010 yards (15.5 average) and three touchdowns. On July 29, 2006, Yeast was released by the Tiger-Cats. Following his years as a Tiger-Cat, Yeast had a short stint with the Saskatchewan Roughriders.

== Coaching career ==
As the offensive coordinator in 2009, Yeast was a crucial component for the Marion County High School football team, leading them to their first state semifinal appearance. Later, after one season as head coach at Bryan Station High School in Lexington, Kentucky, Yeast became wide receiver coach at Tiffin University in Tiffin, Ohio. On March 3, 2014, he became the head football coach at Fremont Ross High School in Fremont, Ohio. December 2018, Yeast was hired as the head coach at Kentucky Wesleyan College in Owensboro, Kentucky. He resigned on February 15, 2022, to become the head coach at Mercer County in his hometown.

== Head coaching record ==
=== College ===
Year	Team	Overall	Conference	Standing	Bowl/playoffs
Kentucky Wesleyan Panthers (Great Midwest Athletic Conference) (2019–2021)
2019	Kentucky Wesleyan	1–10	1–6	T–7th	
2020–21	Kentucky Wesleyan	1–4	1–4	T–5th	
2021	Kentucky Wesleyan	3–8	1–6	T–7th	
Kentucky Wesleyan:		5–22	3–18		
Total:		5–22			
