= Rafael Little =

American gridiron football player (born 1986)

No. 32
- Position: Running back

Personal information
- Born: September 23, 1986 (age 40); Anderson, South Carolina, U.S.
- Listed height: 5 ft 8.75 in (1.75 m)
- Listed weight: 200 lb (91 kg)

Career information
- High school: T. L. Hanna (Anderson)
- College: Kentucky

Career history
- 2008–2009: Tennessee Titans*
- 2009: Winnipeg Blue Bombers*
- 2010: Calgary Stampeders
- * Offseason or practice squad member only

Awards and highlights
- First-team All-SEC (2005)
- Stats at Pro Football Reference
- Stats at CFL.ca (archive)

Rafael Little (born September 23, 1986) is an American former football running back. He was signed by the Tennessee Titans as an undrafted free agent in 2008. He played college football at Kentucky.

Little was also a member of the Winnipeg Blue Bombers and Calgary Stampeders of the Canadian Football League (CFL).
