= 2004 Kentucky Wildcats football team =

American college football season

2004 Kentucky Wildcats football
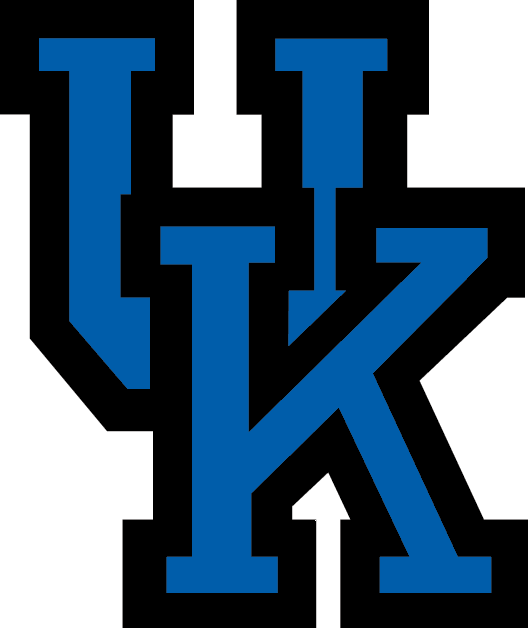
- Conference: Southeastern Conference
- Eastern Division
- Record: 2–9 (1–7 SEC)
- Head coach: Rich Brooks (2nd season)
- Offensive coordinator: Ron Hudson (2nd season)
- Offensive scheme: Pro-style
- Defensive coordinator: Mike Archer (5th season)
- Base defense: 4–3
- Home stadium: Commonwealth Stadium

2004 Southeastern Conference football standings
	Conf.			Overall
Team	W		L	W		L
Eastern Division
No. 13 Tennessee x	7	–	1	10	–	3
No. 7 Georgia	6	–	2	10	–	2
Florida	4	–	4	7	–	5
South Carolina	4	–	4	6	–	5
Kentucky	1	–	7	2	–	9
Vanderbilt	1	–	7	2	–	9
Western Division
No. 2 Auburn x$	8	–	0	13	–	0
No. 16 LSU	6	–	2	9	–	3
Alabama	3	–	5	6	–	6
Arkansas	3	–	5	5	–	6
Ole Miss	3	–	5	4	–	7
Mississippi State	2	–	6	3	–	8
Championship: Auburn 38, Tennessee 28
$ – BCS representative as conference champion; x – Division champion/co-champions; Rankings from AP Poll

The 2004 Kentucky Wildcats football team represented the University of Kentucky during the 2004 NCAA Division I-A football season. The team participated as members of the Southeastern Conference in the Eastern Division. They played their home games at Commonwealth Stadium in Lexington, Kentucky.

Coached by Rich Brooks, the Wildcats finished the season with a 2–9 record. Offensive coordinator Ron Hudson resigned prior to the last game of the season against Tennessee. Wide receivers coach Joker Phillips took over play calling duties as the Wildcats nearly upset the 15th ranked Volunteers.

== Schedule ==
Date	Time	Opponent	Site	TV	Result	Attendance
September 3	3:30 pm	at Louisville*	Papa John's Cardinal Stadium; Louisville, Kentucky (Battle for the Governor's Cup)	ESPN	L 0–28	42,681
September 18	7:00 pm	Indiana*	Commonwealth Stadium; Lexington, Kentucky (rivalry)		W 51–32	65,532
September 25	11:30 am	at No. 16 Florida	Ben Hill Griffin Stadium; Gainesville, Florida (rivalry)	ESPN2	L 3–20	89,741
October 2	7:00 pm	Ohio*	Commonwealth Stadium; Lexington, Kentucky	PPV	L 16–28	61,514
October 9	12:30 pm	Alabama	Commonwealth Stadium; Lexington, Kentucky	JPS	L 17–45	65,482
October 16	7:00 pm	South Carolina^{†}	Commonwealth Stadium; Lexington, Kentucky	PPV	L 7–12	63,086
October 23	2:30 pm	at No. 3 Auburn	Jordan–Hare Stadium; Auburn, Alabama		L 10–42	85,263
October 30	2:30 pm	at Mississippi State	Davis Wade Stadium; Starkville, Mississippi		L 7–22	40,810
November 6	12:30 pm	No. 8 Georgia^{†}	Commonwealth Stadium; Lexington, Kentucky	JPS	L 17–62	63,110
November 13	1:00 pm	Vanderbilt	Commonwealth Stadium; Lexington, Kentucky (rivalry)		W 14–13	55,278
November 27	12:30 pm	at No. 15 Tennessee	Neyland Stadium; Knoxville, Tennessee (Battle for the Barrel)	JPS	L 31–37	102,453
*Non-conference game; ^{†}Homecoming; Rankings from AP Poll released prior to the game; All times are in Eastern time

== Roster ==
2004 Kentucky Wildcats football team roster
Players
Coaches
Offense

Pos.	#	Name	Class
[[American football positions|]]
[[American football positions|]]

Defense

Pos.	#	Name	Class
[[American football positions|]]

Special teams

Pos.	#	Name	Class

}}

Head coach

- [[]]

Coordinators/assistant coaches

Legend

- (C) Team captain
- (S) Suspended
- (I) Ineligible
- Injured
- Redshirt
