= Ivy Joe Hunter =

American football player (born 1966)

No. 45
- Positions: Running back, fullback

Personal information
- Born: November 16, 1966 (age 59); Gainesville, Florida, U.S.
- Listed height: 6 ft 0 in (1.83 m)
- Listed weight: 237 lb (108 kg)

Career information
- High school: Buchholz (Gainesville)
- College: Kentucky
- NFL draft: 1989: 7th round, 182nd overall pick

Career history
- Indianapolis Colts (1989–1990); New England Patriots (1991)

Career NFL statistics
- Rushing yards: 100
- Rushing average: 3.2
- Receptions: 11
- Receiving yards: 97
- Stats at Pro Football Reference

Ivy Joe Hunter (born November 16, 1966) is an American former professional football player who was a fullback for three seasons in the National Football League (NFL) for the Indianapolis Colts and New England Patriots. He played high school football at Buchholz High School in Gainesville, Florida and college football for the Kentucky Wildcats.

Hunter was selected by the Indianapolis Colts in the seventh round of the 1989 NFL draft, where he played for two years accumulating 100 yards rushing.
