= George Adams (American football) =

American football player (born 1962)

No. 33
- Position: Running back

Personal information
- Born: December 22, 1962 (age 63); Lexington, Kentucky, U.S.
- Listed height: 6 ft 1 in (1.85 m)
- Listed weight: 225 lb (102 kg)

Career information
- High school: Lafayette (Lexington)
- College: Kentucky
- NFL draft: 1985: 1st round, 19th overall pick

Career history
- New York Giants (1985–1989); New England Patriots (1990–1991)

Awards and highlights
- Super Bowl champion (XXI); First-team All-SEC (1984)

Career NFL statistics
- Rushing yards: 886
- Rushing average: 3.4
- Rushing touchdowns: 3
- Stats at Pro Football Reference

George Wallace Adams (born December 22, 1962) is an American former professional football player who was a running back in the National Football League (NFL). He played college football for the Kentucky Wildcats and was selected in the first round of the 1985 NFL draft. He played in the NFL for the New York Giants and the New England Patriots.

== NFL career statistics ==
Legend
| | Won the Super Bowl |
| **Bold** | Career high |

=== Regular season ===
| Year | Team | Games | | Rushing | | | | | Receiving | | | | | Fumbles | |
| Year | Team | GP | GS | Att | Yds | Avg | Lng | TD | Rec | Yds | Avg | Lng | TD | Fum | Lost |
|---|---|---|---|---|---|---|---|---|---|---|---|---|---|---|---|
| 1985 | NYG | **16** | 0 | **128** | **498** | 3.9 | **39** | **2** | 31 | **389** | **12.5** | **70** | **2** | **7** | **3** |
| 1986 | NYG | 0 | 0 | DNP | | | | | | | | | | | |
| 1987 | NYG | 12 | **7** | 61 | 169 | 2.8 | 14 | 1 | **35** | 298 | 8.5 | 25 | 1 | 3 | 1 |
| 1988 | NYG | **16** | 1 | 29 | 76 | 2.6 | 15 | 0 | 27 | 174 | 6.4 | 19 | 0 | 0 | 0 |
| 1989 | NYG | 14 | 0 | 9 | 29 | 3.2 | 8 | 0 | 2 | 7 | 3.5 | 10 | 0 | 0 | 0 |
| 1990 | NE | **16** | **7** | 28 | 111 | **4.0** | 13 | 0 | 16 | 146 | 9.1 | 28 | 1 | 1 | 1 |
| 1991 | NE | 2 | 1 | 2 | 3 | 1.5 | 2 | 0 | 0 | 0 | 0.0 | 0 | 0 | 0 | 0 |
| Career | | 76 | 16 | 257 | 886 | 3.4 | 39 | 3 | 111 | 1,014 | 9.1 | 70 | 4 | 11 | 5 |

== Personal life ==
Adams' son, Jamal, played safety at Louisiana State University. He was picked sixth overall by the New York Jets in the 2017 NFL draft.

== See also ==
- History of the New York Giants (1979-1993)
