= 2005 Kentucky Wildcats football team =

American college football season

2005 Kentucky Wildcats football
- Conference: Southeastern Conference
- Eastern Division
- Record: 3–8 (2–6 SEC)
- Head coach: Rich Brooks (3rd season)
- Offensive coordinator: Joker Phillips (1st season)
- Offensive scheme: Pro-style
- Defensive coordinator: Mike Archer (6th season)
- Base defense: 4–3
- Home stadium: Commonwealth Stadium

2005 Southeastern Conference football standings
	Conf.			Overall
Team	W		L	W		L
Eastern Division
No. 10 Georgia x$	6	–	2	10	–	3
South Carolina	5	–	3	7	–	5
No. 12 Florida	5	–	3	9	–	3
Vanderbilt	3	–	5	5	–	6
Tennessee	3	–	5	5	–	6
Kentucky	2	–	6	3	–	8
Western Division
No. 5 LSU xy	7	–	1	11	–	2
No. 14 Auburn x	7	–	1	9	–	3
No. 8 Alabama	6	–	2	10	–	2
Arkansas	2	–	6	4	–	7
Mississippi State	1	–	7	3	–	8
Ole Miss	1	–	7	3	–	8
Championship: Georgia 34, LSU 14
$ – BCS representative as conference champion; x – Division champion/co-champions; y – Championship game participant; Alabama had all victories vacated by the NCAA in 2010. As such, the official record for Alabama is 0–2 (0–2).; Rankings from AP Poll

The 2005 Kentucky Wildcats football team represented the University of Kentucky during the 2005 NCAA Division I-A football season. They participated as members of the Southeastern Conference in the Eastern Division. They played their home games at Commonwealth Stadium in Lexington, Kentucky. The team was coached by Rich Brooks.

== Schedule ==
Date	Time	Opponent	Site	TV	Result	Attendance	Source
September 4	3:30 pm	No. 12 Louisville*	Commonwealth Stadium; Lexington, KY (Governor's Cup)	ESPN Classic	L 24–31	70,752	
September 10	6:00 pm	Idaho State*	Commonwealth Stadium; Lexington, KY		W 41–29	59,519	
September 17	6:45 pm	at Indiana*	Memorial Stadium; Bloomington, IN (rivalry)	ESPNC	L 13–48	40,240	
September 24	3:30 pm	No. 5 Florida	Commonwealth Stadium; Lexington, KY (rivalry)	CBS	L 28–49	66,820	
October 8	1:00 pm	at South Carolina	Williams–Brice Stadium; Columbia, SC	PPV	L 16–44	71,009	
October 22	2:00 pm	at Ole Miss	Vaught–Hemingway Stadium; Oxford, MS		L 7–13	48,457	
October 29	7:00 pm	Mississippi State^{†}	Commonwealth Stadium; Lexington, KY		W 13–7	55,163	
November 5	1:00 pm	No. 17 Auburn	Commonwealth Stadium; Lexington, KY		L 17–49	60,519	
November 12	2:00 pm	at Vanderbilt	Vanderbilt Stadium; Nashville, TN (rivalry)		W 48–43	29,506	
November 19	12:30 pm	at No. 14 Georgia	Sanford Stadium; Athens, GA	JPS	L 13–45	92,746	
November 26	12:30 pm	Tennessee	Commonwealth Stadium; Lexington, KY (rivalry)	JPS	L 8–27	61,924	
*Non-conference game; ^{†}Homecoming; Rankings from AP Poll released prior to the game; All times are in Eastern time

== Roster ==
2005 Kentucky Wildcats football team roster
Players
Coaches
Offense

Pos.	#	Name	Class
[[American football positions|]]
[[American football positions|]]

Defense

Pos.	#	Name	Class
[[American football positions|]]

Special teams

Pos.	#	Name	Class

}}

Head coach

- [[]]

Coordinators/assistant coaches

Legend

- (C) Team captain
- (S) Suspended
- (I) Ineligible
- Injured
- Redshirt
