= Moe Williams =

American football player (born 1974)

No. 20, 21, 23
- Position: Running back

Personal information
- Born: July 26, 1974 (age 52); Columbus, Georgia, U.S.
- Listed height: 6 ft 1 in (1.85 m)
- Listed weight: 205 lb (93 kg)

Career information
- High school: Spencer (Columbus)
- College: Kentucky (1993–1995)
- NFL draft: 1996: 3rd round, 75th overall pick

Career history
- Minnesota Vikings (1996–2000); Baltimore Ravens (2001); Minnesota Vikings (2002–2005); St. Louis Rams (2006)*
- * Offseason or practice squad member only

Awards and highlights
- First-team All-SEC (1995); Second-team All-SEC (1993)

Career NFL statistics
- Rushing yards: 1,826
- Rushing average: 4.2
- Rushing touchdowns: 21
- Receptions: 154
- Receiving yards: 1,511
- Receiving touchdowns: 4
- Stats at Pro Football Reference

Maurece Jabari Williams (born July 26, 1974) is an American former professional football player who was a running back in the National Football League (NFL). He played college football for the Kentucky Wildcats and was selected in the third round of the 1996 NFL draft. He played in the NFL for the Minnesota Vikings and Baltimore Ravens.

== Early life ==
While attending Spencer High School in Columbus, Georgia, Williams was a standout running back in football. As a senior, he garnered All-American honors, was named the Georgia High School Player of the Year, and lead his team to its first playoff appearance in 24 years.

== College career ==
At the University of Kentucky, Williams made an immediate impact, setting the freshman rushing record with 986 yards in 1993. He gained 58 yards on 13 carries in the Peach Bowl at the conclusion of his freshman season at the University of Kentucky.

In 1994, despite playing for a team that finished with a 1–10 record, Williams gained 805 yards on 160 carries, starting all eleven games.

In 1995 Williams put together the best single-season rushing performance in school history, rushing for 1,600 yards in 1995 and topping 100 rushing yards in seven games. In that season Williams also led the Southeastern Conference in rushing yards per game (145.5), all purpose yardage (1,826 yards, 166 yards per game) and scoring (102 points). For the season Williams was honorable mention All America, a consensus All-Southeastern Conference selection and a finalist for the Doak Walker Award.

During the 1995 season in a single game at South Carolina, Williams rushed for 299 yards (with three touchdowns in the first half) and a total of 429 all purpose yards (57 receiving and 73 on kickoff returns), the most ever by a player in the Southeastern Conference and the second highest total in NCAA history. His 7.5 yards per rush was also an SEC record (minimum 40 attempts). After that game Williams was named the national player of the week by the National Football Foundation, Sports Illustrated and the SEC.

Williams left Kentucky with a career total of 3,333 rushing yards in three seasons (an average of 5.4 yards per carry on 618 attempts), along with 38 receptions for 313 yards (8.2 per catch) and 27 touchdowns scored.

Williams entered the NFL draft in 1996 and was chosen in the third round by the Minnesota Vikings with the 75th overall pick.

== Professional career ==
Williams spent most of his 10-year NFL career with the Vikings, with the exception of a season with the Baltimore Ravens in 2001. Williams' best year came in 2003, when he amassed 745 rushing yards and 644 receiving yards.

Williams was involved in the 2005 Minnesota Vikings boat cruise scandal in October 2005. He was charged in December 2005 with indecent conduct, disorderly conduct and lewd or lascivious conduct. On April 20, 2006, he was found guilty of disorderly conduct and was acquitted of the two other misdemeanor charges and sentenced to a $300 fine and 30 hours of community service.

== Post-NFL career ==
Williams has recently turned his attention to professional horse racing. He now trains thoroughbreds and won his first race as a trainer at Calder Race Course.

== Personal life ==
Williams's son, Amaree Williams, is a defensive end at Mississippi State.
