= 2006 Sugar Bowl =

2006 Nokia Sugar Bowl
- BCS Bowl Game; 72nd Sugar Bowl
West Virginia Mountaineers	Georgia Bulldogs
(10–1)	(10–2)
Big East	SEC
38	35
Head coach: Rich Rodriguez	Head coach: Mark Richt
AP / Coaches / BCS; 11 / 11 / 11	AP / Coaches / BCS; 8 / 8 / 7
	1	2	3	4	Total
West Virginia	21	10	0	7	38
Georgia	0	21	7	7	35
- Date: January 2, 2006
- Season: 2005
- Stadium: Georgia Dome
- Location: Atlanta, Georgia
- MVP: West Virginia RB Steve Slaton
- Favorite: Georgia by 7
- National anthem: Mulberry Lane
- Referee: Jay Stricherz (Pac-10)
- Attendance: 74,458

United States TV coverage
- Network: ABC
- Announcers: Brad Nessler, Bob Griese and Lynn Swann
- Nielsen ratings: 9.0

The 2006 Nokia Sugar Bowl was played on January 2, 2006, as part of the Bowl Championship Series. This 72nd edition of the Sugar Bowl featured the West Virginia Mountaineers, champions of the Big East, and the Southeastern Conference Champion Georgia Bulldogs. West Virginia's upset victory bolstered the Big East's profile in the wake of losing three members to the ACC, and likely preserved the conference's automatic inclusion in the BCS. The game was played in Atlanta, Georgia, as its traditional site, the Louisiana Superdome, was unfit for use in the aftermath of Hurricane Katrina.

The freshmen-led West Virginia team stunned Georgia—playing in what amounted to a home game in the Georgia Dome—by opening a 21–0 lead by the end of the first quarter. While West Virginia pushed the lead to 28–0 a minute into the second quarter, Georgia rallied to close the gap to 31–21 at halftime, behind quarterback D.J. Shockley. The 52 first-half points were a record for a single half in a BCS game.

In the third quarter, Georgia cut the lead to 31–28 following a 68-yard scoring drive.

Freshman quarterback Pat White led West Virginia on a 9-play, 95-yard drive to extend its lead to 38–28 with 8:32 remaining in the game. Georgia responded with a 90-yard drive of its own to cut the lead to 38–35 with 5:13 left.

With 1:26 remaining in the game and facing a 4th-and-6 near midfield, West Virginia's Phil Brady ran for 10 yards on a fake punt to seal the win. West Virginia's freshman running back Steve Slaton was named the game's MVP, having rushed for a Sugar Bowl-record 204 yards and 3 touchdowns, including two separate scores of 52-yards each. Fellow freshman Darius Reynaud, a wide receiver, scored the Mountaineers' other two touchdowns.

== Aftermath ==
West Virginia capped off an 11–1 season ranked #5 in the nation, while Georgia fell to 10–3. The win was the first of four bowl victories for West Virginia QB Pat White.

ESPN ranked the 2006 Sugar Bowl #6 on its list of the best major bowl games of the BCS era.

This was the last Sugar Bowl to host the SEC champion until the 2014 season when Alabama played in the national semifinal game. The SEC champion would play in the BCS National Championship Game each of the eight years following the 2006 game.
