= 2005 West Virginia Mountaineers football team =

American college football season

2005 West Virginia Mountaineers football

Big East champion Sugar Bowl champion

Sugar Bowl, W 38–35 vs. Georgia
- Conference: Big East Conference

Ranking
- Coaches: No. 6
- AP: No. 5
- Record: 11–1 (7–0 Big East)
- Head coach: Rich Rodriguez (5th season)
- Offensive coordinator: Calvin Magee (2nd season)
- Offensive scheme: Spread option
- Defensive coordinator: Jeff Casteel (4th season)
- Base defense: 3–3–5
- Captains: Garin Justice; Mike Lorello; Jahmile Addae; Ernest Hunter
- Home stadium: Milan Puskar Stadium

2005 Big East Conference football standings
	Conf.			Overall
Team	W		L	W		L
No. 5 West Virginia $	7	–	0	11	–	1
No. 19 Louisville	5	–	2	9	–	3
Rutgers	4	–	3	7	–	5
South Florida	4	–	3	6	–	6
Pittsburgh	4	–	3	5	–	6
Connecticut	2	–	5	5	–	6
Cincinnati	2	–	5	4	–	7
Syracuse	0	–	7	1	–	10
$ – BCS representative as conference champion; Rankings from AP Poll

The 2005 West Virginia Mountaineers football team represented West Virginia University as a member of the Big East Conference during the 2005 NCAA Division I-A football season. Led by fifth-year head coach Rich Rodriguez, the Mountaineers compiled an overall record of 11–1 with a mark of 7–0 in conference play, winning the Big East for the third consecutive season. West Virginia was invited to the Sugar Bowl, where the Mountaineers defeated Georgia. The team played home games at Milan Puskar Stadium in Morgantown, West Virginia.

== Schedule ==
Date	Time	Opponent	Rank	Site	TV	Result	Attendance	Source
September 4	1:30 p.m.	at Syracuse		Carrier Dome; Syracuse, NY (rivalry)	ABC	W 15–7	45,418	
September 10	6:00 p.m.	Wofford*		Milan Puskar Stadium; Morgantown, WV		W 35–7	54,630	
September 17	12:10 p.m.	at Maryland*		Byrd Stadium; College Park, MD (rivalry)	JPS	W 31–19	52,413	
September 24	12:05 p.m.	East Carolina*		Milan Puskar Stadium; Morgantown, WV	ESPN Plus	W 20–15	57,295	
October 1	12:05 p.m.	No. 3 Virginia Tech*		Milan Puskar Stadium; Morgantown, WV (rivalry)	ESPN	L 17–34	60,193	
October 8	12:06 p.m.	at Rutgers		Rutgers Stadium; Piscataway, NJ	ESPN Plus	W 27–14	21,717	
October 15	3:42 p.m.	No. 19 Louisville^{†}		Milan Puskar Stadium; Morgantown, WV	ABC	W 46–44 ^{3OT}	59,797	
November 2	7:36 p.m.	Connecticut	No. 17	Milan Puskar Stadium; Morgantown, WV	ESPN2	W 45–13	52,808	
November 9	7:30 p.m.	at Cincinnati	No. 14	Nippert Stadium; Cincinnati, OH	ESPN2	W 38–0	25,893	
November 24	8:05 p.m.	Pittsburgh	No. 11	Milan Puskar Stadium; Morgantown, WV (Backyard Brawl)	ESPN	W 45–13	52,997	
December 3	7:30 p.m.	at South Florida	No. 11	Raymond James Stadium; Tampa, FL		W 28–13	45,274	
January 2	8:51 p.m.	vs. No. 7 Georgia*	No. 11	Georgia Dome; Atlanta, GA (Sugar Bowl)	ABC	W 38–35	74,458	
*Non-conference game; ^{†}Homecoming; Rankings from AP Poll and BCS Standings after October 17 released prior to game; All times are in Eastern time

== Rankings ==
Ranking movements Legend: ██ Increase in ranking ██ Decrease in ranking RV = Received votes
	Week															
Poll	Pre	1	2	3	4	5	6	7	8	9	10	11	12	13	14	Final
AP	RV	RV	RV	RV	RV	RV	RV	20	18	18	16	13	12	12	11	5
Coaches	RV	RV	RV	RV	RV	RV	25	20	17	16	15	13	12	12	11	6
Harris	Not released				RV	RV	25	20	18	18	17	14	13	13	12	Not released
BCS	Not released							17	17	17	14	12	11	11	11	Not released

== Preseason ==
The 2005 season followed a disappointing 2004 campaign, where the Mountaineers started the season with National Championship expectations only to finish the season 8–4. Despite a number of starters returning on defense, the question marks on offense lead many to think the '05 season was going to be a rebuilding year with most national publications picking the Mountaineers to finish behind Louisville and Pitt or lower. With QB Rasheed Marshall and RB K.J. Harris leaving, the quarterback and halfback positions were open. Adam Bednarik and redshirt-freshman Pat White were competing for the spot, with Coach Rich Rodriguez opting to use a rotation that allowed them both to play. It marked the first season for the "new" Big East, welcoming Louisville, Cincinnati, and South Florida into the league following Boston College leaving to join former members Virginia Tech and Miami in the ACC, and Temple getting kicked out of the league.

== Game summaries ==
=== At Syracuse ===
Team	1	2	3	4	Total
• West Virginia	0	7	3	5	15
Syracuse	0	7	0	0	7

- Date: September 4
- Location: Carrier Dome
  Syracuse, NY
- Game start: 1:30 pm EDT
- Game attendance: 45,418
- Game weather: Indoors
- TV announcers (ABC): Brad Nessler, Bob Griese, Lynn Swann

Scoring summary
Q2	14:07	SYR	Damien 5 yard run (Ricky Krautman kick)	SYR 7-0
Q2	12:24	WVU	Eric Wicks 32 yard interception return (Pat McAfee kick)	Tied 7-7
Q3	5:53	WVU	Pat McAfee 33 yard field goal	WVU 10-7
Q4	8:02	WVU	TEAM Safety	WVU 12-7
Q4	3:26	WVU	Pat McAfee 33 yard field goal	WVU 15-7

The 2005 West Virginia Mountaineers opened the football season at Syracuse. Syracuse was playing its first game under new head coach Greg Robinson. The Mountaineers committed 5 turnovers, including 4 lost fumbles, but managed to hold on to a lead for a 15–7 win. Syracuse started the scoring with a 5-yard touchdown run by tailback Damien Rhodes.

West Virginia tied the game at 7 with Eric Wicks's 32-yard interception return for a touchdown. Right before halftime, the Mountaineers had a chance to take a 10–7 lead, but freshman place-kicker Pat McAfee missed a 47-yard field goal wide right. He redeemed himself later with a 33-yard field goal with 5:33 left in the third quarter.

With just over 8 minutes left in the game, West Virginia's Ernest Hunter tackled Perry Patterson in the end zone for a safety to increase the lead to 12–7. On West Virginia's next possession they added a 26-yard field goal by McAfee with 3 minutes left. The win brought the Mountaineers record to 1–0, and the Orangemen fell to 0–1. The win increased WVU's streak to 4 wins over Syracuse.

Statistics

Statistics	West Virginia	Syracuse
First downs	16	7
Total yards	339	103
Passing yards	167	85
Rushing yards	172	18
Penalties	7-65	11-71
Turnovers	5	2
Time of possession	33:55	26:05

Team	Category	Player	Statistics
West Virginia	Passing	Adam Bednarik	14–21, 104 yards, 1 INT
West Virginia	Rushing	Adam Bednarik	12 carries, 72 yards
West Virginia	Receiving	Brandon Myles	5 receptions, 76 yards
Syracuse	Passing	Perry Patterson	15–31, 85 yards, 2 INTs
Syracuse	Rushing	Damien Rhodes	16 carries, 46 yards, 1 TD
Syracuse	Receiving	Damien Rhodes	7 receptions, 21 yards

=== Wofford ===
Team	1	2	3	4	Total
Wofford	0	0	7	0	7
• West Virginia	14	7	7	7	35

- Date: September 10
- Location: Milan Puskar Stadium
  Morgantown, WV
- Game start: 6:00 pm EDT
- Game attendance: 60,758
- Game weather: 82, Clear, Wind N @ 6 mph

Scoring summary
Q1	6:53	WVU	Darius Reynaud 27 yard pass from Adam Bednarik (Pat McAfee kick)	WVU 7-0
Q1	2:28	WVU	Pernell Williams 5 yard run (Pat McAfee kick)	WVU 14-0
Q2	7:22	WVU	Jason Gwaltney 1 yard run (Pat McAfee kick)	WVU 21-0
Q3	10:53	WVU	Adam Bednarik 3 yard run (Pat McAfee kick)	WVU 28-0
Q3	2:05	WOF	Michael Hobbs 1 yard run (Nick Robinson)	WVU 28-7
Q4	14:43	WVU	Pat White 48 yard run (Pat McAfee kick)	WVU 35-7

Backup quarterback Pat White ran for 107 yards and a touchdown to lead West Virginia to a 35–7 victory over I-AA Wofford. West Virginia finished the game with over 500 yards of total offense, and no turnovers.

Statistics

Statistics	Wofford	West Virginia
First downs	10	24
Total yards	154	511
Passing yards	76	172
Rushing yards	78	339
Penalties	3-35	5-47
Turnovers	4	0
Time of possession	27:13	32:47

Team	Category	Player	Statistics
Wofford	Passing	Josh Collier	5–9, 70 yards, 2 INTs
Wofford	Rushing	Michael Hobbs	13 carries, 40 yards, 1 TD
Wofford	Receiving	Brandon Berry	2 receptions, 15 yards
West Virginia	Passing	Adam Bednarik	6-6, 90 yards, 1 TD
West Virginia	Rushing	Pat White	11 carries, 107 yards, 1 TD
West Virginia	Receiving	Brandon Myles	3 receptions, 57 yards

=== At Maryland ===
Team	1	2	3	4	Total
• West Virginia	0	7	0	24	31
Maryland	0	3	3	13	19

- Date: September 17
- Location: Byrd Stadium
  College Park, MD
- Game start: 12:10 p.m. EDT
- Game attendance: 52,413
- Game weather: 84, Hazy, Wind NW @ 11 mph
- TV announcers (JBS): Steve Martin, Rick Walker, Mike Hogewood

Scoring summary
Q2	9:39	WVU	Jason Gwaltney 1 yard run (Pat McAfee kick)	WVU 7-0
Q2	0:55	MD	Dan Ennis 33 yard field goal	WVU 7-3
Q3	5:18	MD	Dan Ennis 34 yard field goal	WVU 7-6
Q4	14:52	WVU	Owen Schmitt 3 yard run (Pat McAfee kick)	WVU 14-6
Q4	10:41	WVU	Pernell Williams 1 yard run (Pat McAfee kick)	WVU 21-6
Q4	10:22	MD	Vernon Davis 73 yard pass from Sam Hollenbach (Dan Ennis kick)	WVU 21-13
Q4	8:24	MD	Jo Jo Walker 12 yard pass from Sam Hollenbach (2-point pass failed)	WVU 21-19
Q4	4:56	WVU	Jason Gwaltney 15 yard run (Pat McAfee kick)	WVU 28-19
Q4	2:18	WVU	Pat McAfee 40 yard field goal	WVU 31-19

Backup quarterback Pat White directed three fourth-quarter touchdown drives, and West Virginia ripped Maryland's defense for 301 yards rushing in a 31–19 victory. Freshman Jason Gwaltney scored two touchdowns for the Mountaineers (3–0), who had lost three straight at Maryland (1–2) since 1997. West Virginia let a 15-point lead dwindle to 21–19 before Gwaltney scored on a 15-yard run with 4:56 left. The Mountaineers then recovered a fumble by Maryland quarterback Sam Hollenbach, and Pat McAfee kicked a 40-yard field goal to make it 31–19 with 2:18 remaining. White went 3-for-5 for 29 yards, but guided an offense that amassed 24 points and 144 yards in the final 15 minutes.

Statistics

Statistics	West Virginia	Maryland
First downs	18	15
Total yards	387	341
Passing yards	86	291
Rushing yards	301	50
Penalties	9-68	4-30
Turnovers	1	1
Time of possession	35:40	24:20

Team	Category	Player	Statistics
West Virginia	Passing	Adam Bednarik	5–6, 57 yards
West Virginia	Rushing	Owen Schmitt	6 carries, 80 yards, 1 TD
West Virginia	Receiving	Brandon Myles	3 receptions, 52 yards
Maryland	Passing	Sam Hollenbach	20–31, 291 yards, 2 TDs
Maryland	Rushing	Mario Merrills	9 carries, 35 yards
Maryland	Receiving	Vernon Davis	5 receptions, 158 yards, 1 TD

=== East Carolina ===
Team	1	2	3	4	Total
East Carolina	3	3	3	6	15
• West Virginia	7	13	0	0	20

- Date: September 24
- Location: Milan Puskar Stadium
  Morgantown, WV
- Game start: Noon EDT
- Game attendance: 57,295
- Game weather: 74, Overcast, Wind NW @ 8 mph
- TV announcers (ESPN+): Dave Sims, John Congemi

The previous 3 times the Mountaineers played East Carolina were blow-outs, 37–17, 48–7, and 56–23. This one appeared to be another one after the Mountaineers led 20–6 at half-time. The offense looked terrible the entire game, as they turned the ball over 4 times. Backup quarterback Pat White tossed two interceptions and Adam Bednarik threw one and fumbled once before leaving the game with a knee injury in the first quarter. The defense had to constantly defend short fields, after turnovers in their own territory. The defense only allowed 287 yards and 1 touchdown in the entire game. West Virginia failed to score a single second half point, and managed to escape 20–15.

Statistics

Statistics	East Carolina	West Virginia
First downs	20	17
Total yards	287	307
Passing yards	206	180
Rushing yards	81	127
Penalties	3-25	5-49
Turnovers	2	4
Time of possession	31:53	28:07

=== Virginia Tech ===
Team	1	2	3	4	Total
• #3 Virginia Tech	10	14	3	7	34
West Virginia	0	14	3	0	17

- Date: October 1
- Location: Milan Puskar Stadium
  Morgantown, WV
- Game start: Noon EDT
- Game attendance: 60,193
- Game weather: 70, Fair, Wind SW @ 5 mph
- TV announcers (ESPN): Mark Jones, Chris Spielman, Rob Stone

Third-ranked Virginia Tech clashed with West Virginia, at Milan Puskar Stadium in a showdown of two 4–0 unbeaten teams. Virginia Tech had a monster game from their star quarterback, Marcus Vick. The junior completed 15 of 17 passes for 177 yards, and rushed for 74 yards on 12 carries. Virginia Tech jumped out to an early 10–0 lead, through a West Virginia turnover. Virginia Tech played a solid game, converting 10 out of 15 third down attempts, and having only one turnover. With Virginia Tech leading 24–17 late in the fourth quarter, a touchdown run sealed the deal for the Mountaineers who fell to 4–1 on the season. True freshman Steve Slaton was a bright spot for the Mountaineers, rushing for 90 yards on 11 carries.

Statistics

Statistics	Virginia Tech	West Virginia
First downs	23	11
Total yards	391	253
Passing yards	177	103
Rushing yards	214	150
Penalties	2-10	7-55
Turnovers	0	2
Time of possession	37:21	22:39

=== At Rutgers ===
Team	1	2	3	4	Total
• West Virginia	14	7	3	3	27
Rutgers	0	7	7	0	14

- Date: October 8
- Location: Rutgers Stadium
  Piscataway, NJ
- Game start: Noon EDT
- Game attendance: 21,717
- Game weather: 73, Rainy, heavy at times, Wind S @ 14 mph
- TV announcers (ESPN+): Dave Sims, John Congemi

Steve Slaton ran for a career-high 139 yards and one touchdown to help West Virginia beat Rutgers 27–14. Jason Gwaltney added 57 yards rushing for West Virginia which beat Rutgers for the 11th straight time. West Virginia rushed for 236 yards against a depleted Rutgers defense, which was without three starters—linebacker Terry Bynes, defensive back Jason Nugent and end Eric Foster.

Statistics

Statistics	West Virginia	Rutgers
First downs	15	17
Total yards	314	295
Passing yards	78	171
Rushing yards	236	124
Penalties	5-34	7-45
Turnovers	0	4
Time of possession	26:16	33:44

=== Louisville ===
Team	1	2	3	4	OT	2OT	3OT	Total
#19 Louisville	7	10	7	0	7	7	6	44
• West Virginia	0	0	7	17	7	7	8	46

- Date: October 15
- Location: Milan Puskar Stadium
  Morgantown, WV
- Game start: 3:42 p.m. EDT
- Game attendance: 59,797
- Game weather: 69, Partly cloudy, Wind WNW @ 10 mph
- TV announcers (ABC): Dave LaMont, Terry Bowden, Trenni Kusnierek

In one of the best games of the year, The Louisville Cardinals clashed with the West Virginia Mountaineers who were 5–1. Louisville completely dominated the first half of play racing to a 17–0 lead. West Virginia finally got on the board in the third quarter, when Bednarik hit freshman Steve Slaton on a 14-yard screen-pass for a touchdown. Louisville answered with another touchdown in the third quarter, to take a 24–7 lead after 3 quarters. Early in the 4th quarter starting QB Adam Bednarik left the game with a leg injury and was replaced by Pat White, which proved to be the spark the offense needed.

With just over 8 minutes left in the game, Steve Slaton scored a rushing touchdown to make the score 24–14. With 4:35 left in the game, Pat McAfee kicked a 35-yard field goal to trim the margin to 7. WVU's defense held, and the Mountaineers came back on offense again. Steve Slaton scored with a minute to go to tie the game at 24–24, and send the game into overtime. Starting in the third OT teams are forced to go for two following a TD, Pat White hit Jalloh on a pass which ended up being the deciding points. Louisville responded with a Michael Bush touchdown. On the conversion Brian Brohm, unable to find anyone open, attempted to scramble for the conversion but was tackled short, preserving the WVU victory and giving the Mountaineers the inside track for the conference's BCS berth.

Statistics

Statistics	Louisville	West Virginia
First downs	26	20
Total yards	459	390
Passing yards	277	109
Rushing yards	182	281
Penalties	9-81	9-85
Turnovers	1	0
Time of possession	30:56	29:04

=== Connecticut ===
Team	1	2	3	4	Total
Connecticut	3	0	3	7	13
• #17 West Virginia	14	21	3	7	45

- Date: November 2
- Location: Milan Puskar Stadium
  Morgantown, WV
- Game start: 7:30 p.m. EDT
- Game attendance: 52,808
- Game weather: 47, Clear, Wind S @ 4 mph
- TV announcers (ESPN2): Dave Barnett, Craig James, Holly Rowe

Pat White ran for two touchdowns and threw for another in his first start, leading No. 18 West Virginia to a 45–13 win over Connecticut. West Virginia showed no signs of sluggishness from an 18-day layoff. The Mountaineers built a 35–3 halftime lead, getting a pair of touchdowns following turnovers. The defense limited UConn to 12 rushing yards and 129 overall, the fewest allowed by West Virginia in three seasons. UConn had one of Division I-A's top defenses statistically, but four of its opponents have a combined record of 3–29. The nation's ninth-best rushing attack used a rotation of backs to compile 228 yards against the Huskies. White frustrated UConn with his legs and his arm. He ran for 63 yards on 12 carries.

White hit Brandon Myles with a 20-yard TD pass early in the second quarter. On the first play of the ensuing drive, West Virginia's Warren Young recovered a fumble at the UConn 20.

White then leveled two UConn players on a block that saved teammate Steve Slaton from a big loss. Two plays later, White eluded three defenders on a bootleg run to the right and scored from 14 yards out for a 28–3 lead.

=== At Cincinnati ===
Team	1	2	3	4	Total
• #14 West Virginia	7	14	17	0	38
Cincinnati	0	0	0	0	0

- Date: November 9
- Location: Nippert Stadium
  Cincinnati, OH
- Game start: 7:30 p.m. EDT
- Game attendance: 25,893
- Game weather: 61, Overcast, Wind W @ 9 mph
- TV announcers (ESPN2): Dave Barnett, Craig James, Holly Rowe

Pat White ran for 111 yards, taking off on quarterback draws that set up Steve Slaton's four touchdowns and a 38–0 victory over Cincinnati. White, Slaton and one of the nation's toughest defenses led the Mountaineers to their most lopsided victory of the season and their first shutout since 2002. White spent the night tormenting the nation's youngest defense. He ran straight up the middle on draws, turned upfield on option fakes, and took off on passing plays. The Mountaineers forced four turnovers and prevented Cincinnati from getting closer than the West Virginia 37-yard line until the final play of the game.

=== Pittsburgh ===
Team	1	2	3	4	Total
Pittsburgh	7	6	0	0	13
• #11 West Virginia	14	7	3	21	45

- Date: November 24
- Location: Milan Puskar Stadium
  Morgantown, WV
- Game start: 8:00 p.m. EDT
- Game attendance: 52,997
- Game weather: 18, Cloudy, Wind NW @ 9 mph
- TV announcers (ESPN): Mike Tirico, Kirk Herbstreit, Erin Andrews

Pat White ran for 220 yards on 23 carries to break the Big East rushing record for a quarterback, leading the No. 11 Mountaineers to a 45–13 victory over Pittsburgh. White ran for two touchdowns and passed for another. The day began with massive snowfall that forced the game to be played on a frozen field with swirling snow flurries and a 7-degree wind chill. West Virginia clinched at least a tie for the Big East title and avenged a 16–13 loss to Pitt the year before in the Backyard Brawl. White broke the conference quarterback rushing record of 210 yards, set by Michael Vick against Boston College in 2000. White also threw for 41 yards. Steve Slaton rushed for 179 yards on 34 carries to help the Mountaineers finish with 451 total yards on the ground. Slaton ran for two TDs and caught a scoring pass.

=== At South Florida ===
Team	1	2	3	4	Total
• #11 West Virginia	7	7	7	7	28
South Florida	0	3	3	7	13

- Date: December 3
- Location: Raymond James Stadium
  Tampa, FL
- Game start: 7:30 p.m. EDT
- Game attendance: 45,274
- Game weather: 63, Clear, Wind NNW @ 1 mph

Pat White ran for 177 yards and two touchdowns, leading West Virginia to a 28–13 victory over South Florida in the 11th-ranked Mountaineers' final tuneup for a Bowl Championship Series appearance. Nine days after running for 220 yards against Pittsburgh to break the Big East rushing record for a quarterback, White was just as impressive in helping the conference champions finish unbeaten in league play for the first time since 1993. The redshirt freshman scored on second-half runs of 65 and 76 yards and finished with his fourth game with at least 100 yards rushing. He also completed 5 of 10 passes for 89 yards and a touchdown as the Mountaineers amassed 394 yards of total offense—305 of that on the ground.

The victory was the sixth straight for West Virginia (10–1, 7–0) and gave the Mountaineers at least 10 wins in a season for the first time since 1993 and just the fifth time in school history.

The dominating performance dispelled any notion that the Mountaineers lacked motivation to win their regular-season finale after wrapping up the Big East title and the league's automatic BCS berth when USF (6–5, 4–3) lost at Connecticut the week before.

Steve Slaton rushed for 89 yards and one touchdown for the Mountaineers, and West Virginia's defense limited Big East rushing leader Andre Hall to 75 yards on 20 carries for South Florida.

=== vs. Georgia (Sugar Bowl) ===
Team	1	2	3	4	Total
• #11 West Virginia	21	10	0	7	38
#7 Georgia	0	21	7	7	35

- Date: January 2, 2006
- Location: Georgia Dome
  Atlanta, GA
- Game start: 8:30 pm EST
- Game attendance: 74,458
- Game weather: Indoors
- Referee: Jay Stricherz
- TV announcers (ABC): Brad Nessler, Bob Griese, Lynn Swann

Scoring summary
Q1	12:12	WVU	Steve Slaton 52 yard run (Pat McAfee kick)	WVU 7–0
Q1	6:27	WVU	Darius Reynaud 3 yard pass from Pat White (Pat McAfee kick)	WVU 14–0
Q1	4:27	WVU	Darius Reynaud 13 yard run (Pat McAfee kick)	WVU 21–0
Q2	14:10	WVU	Steve Slaton 18 yard run (Pat McAfee kick)	WVU 28–0
Q2	12:58	UGA	Kregg Lumpkin 34 yard run (Brandon Coutu kick)	WVU 28–7
Q2	8:52	UGA	Thomas Brown 52 yard run (Brandon Coutu kick)	WVU 28–14
Q2	5:37	WVU	Pat McAfee 27 yard field goal	WVU 31–14
Q2	0:58	UGA	Leonard Pope 4 yard pass from D.J. Shockley (Brandon Coutu kick)	WVU 31–21
Q3	1:44	UGA	A.J. Bryant 34 yard pass from D.J. Shockley (Brandon Coutu kick)	WVU 31–28
Q4	8:32	WVU	Steve Slaton 52 yard run (Pat McAfee kick)	WVU 38–28
Q4	5:13	UGA	Bryan McClendon 43 yard pass from D.J. Shockley (Brandon Coutu kick)	WVU 38–35

The Sugar Bowl, the second BCS bowl, and the final game of six played on January 2, 2006, was contested at the Georgia Dome in Atlanta, having been, like the New Orleans Bowl, displaced from the Louisiana Superdome by Hurricane Katrina. West Virginia, representing the Big East as conference champion, upset Georgia, the winner of the SEC championship game, 38–35. Georgia was looking for its third straight win in Atlanta in as many appearances, having won its last regular season game (against rival Georgia Tech on the Tech campus) and the SEC championship game (over LSU) at the Georgia Dome, located near the Bulldogs' Athens, Georgia campus, but West Virginia took a 28–0 lead in the game's first 16 minutes and withstood a furious Georgia comeback before scoring late in the fourth quarter to secure the win. Mountaineers freshman running back Steve Slaton began a career day early, running for a 52-yard score just 2:48 into the game en route to accumulating 204 yards on 26 carries against a Bulldogs defense that entered the game having allowed only 3.5 yards per carry. On the subsequent West Virginia possession, freshman quarterback Pat White accounted 56 yards of a 64-yard scoring drive, connecting with wide receiver Darius Reynaud for a three-yard touchdown pass; Reynaud caught six passes for 50 yards on the day. Just two plays into the next Bulldogs drive, running back Danny Ware lost the first of what would be three Georgia fumbles on the day, and West Virginia took just five plays to go 26 yards, scoring a touchdown on a 13-yard Reynaud run. The Mountaineers defense stymied an additional Georgia drive and forced a fumble by Georgia quarterback D.J. Shockley, setting up a 50-yard drive that culminated in Slaton's second touchdown scamper, an 18-yarder that gave West Virginia a 28-point lead just 15:50 into the game. Shockley began to have success against the Mountaineers defense in the second quarter, completing three straight passes for a total of 46 yards before running back Kregg Lumpkin, who finished the day with 67 yards on nine carries, scored from 34 yards to put Georgia on the board. After their defense forced a West Virginia punt, the Bulldogs went 91 yards in just six plays, with Thomas Brown's scoring on a 52-yard run; Brown has held largely in check the remainder of the game, totaling only 78 yards on nine carries. A long run by West Virginia fullback Owen Schmitt, who finished the day having run for 80 yards on nine carries, set up a 27-yard Pat McAfee field goal, but Shockley, who finished the day having completed 20 of 33 passes for 278 yards and having gained 62 yards on eight carries, drove his team 80 yards in under five minutes and hit wide receiver Leonard Pope, who caught six passes for 52 yards on the day, from four yards to cut the West Virginia halftime lead to 10 points. After combining to give up more than 600 yards in total offense in the first half, both defenses tightened in the second half and although Brown lost a fumble to the Mountaineers, neither team managed a score until 1:44 remained in the third quarter when Shockley hit A.J. Bryant for a 34-yard touchdown to bring the Bulldogs to within three points. White continued to play well through air and on the ground in the fourth quarter, though, and led his team on an 80-yard drive that ended when Slaton ran for a 52-yard touchdown and once more extended the West Virginia lead to ten. For the game, White completed 11 of 14 passes for 124 yards—completing four passes for 64 yards to senior Brandon Myles, his leading receiver—but also added 79 yards on 24 carries in contributing to his team's 386-yard rushing performance. Shockley drove his team once more, connecting with Mohamed Massaquoi, whom he four times for 43 yards on the day, to convert a crucial third down and then finding Bryan McClendon, who caught three balls for 72 yards, on a 43-yard scoring drive. The Bulldogs defense held but West Virginia punter Phil Brady successfully carried out a fake punt and ran for a first down, allowing the Mountaineers, behind Slaton and White, to run out the clock, run their season to 11–1, and prevent the Big East from going winless in four bowls; South Florida, Rutgers, and Louisville had all lost earlier. The game was the final of three games hosted by the Georgia Dome in four days; the Chick-fil-A Peach Bowl was held on December 30, and an NFL contest between the Carolina Panthers and Atlanta Falcons was played on January 1, which the Panthers won 44–11. The game returned to New Orleans in 2007.

Statistics

Statistics	West Virginia	Georgia
First downs	27	27
Total yards	502	501
Passing yards	120	277
Rushing yards	382	224
Penalties	9-73	4-50
Turnovers	0	3
Time of possession	35:59	24:01

Team	Category	Player	Statistics
West Virginia	Passing	Pat White	11–14, 120 yards, 1 TD
West Virginia	Rushing	Steve Slaton	26 carries, 204 yards, 3 TDs
West Virginia	Receiving	Brandon Myles	4 receptions, 64 yards
Georgia	Passing	D.J. Shockley	20–33, 277 yards, 3 TDs
Georgia	Rushing	Thomas Brown	9 carries, 78 yards, 1 TD
Georgia	Receiving	Bryan McClendon	3 receptions, 72 yards, 1 TD

== Roster ==
Position key

Back	B	Center	C	Cornerback	CB	Defensive back	DB
Defensive end	DE	Defensive lineman	DL	Defensive tackle	DT	End	E
Fullback	FB	Guard	G	Halfback	HB	Kicker	K
Kickoff returner	KR	Offensive tackle	OT	Offensive lineman	OL	Linebacker	LB
Long snapper	LS	Punter	P	Punt returner	PR	Quarterback	QB
Running back	RB	Safety	S	Tight end	TE	Wide receiver	WR

2005 West Virginia Mountaineers football team roster
Players
Coaches
Offense

Pos.	#	Name	Class
WR	2	Darius Reynaud	So
QB	2	Nate Sowers	Fr
QB	3	Markell Harrison	Fr
QB	5	Pat White	Fr
WR	7	Brandon Myles	Sr
QB	9	Dwayne Thompson	So
RB	10	Steve Slaton	Fr
QB	11	Adam Bednarik	So
QB	12	J.R. House	Fr
RB	14	Jason Gwaltney	Fr
QB	15	T.J. Mitchell	Fr
QB	16	Jarrett Brown	Fr
WR	20	Brandon Tate	So
WR	21	Dorrell Jalloh	Fr

Defense

Pos.	#	Name	Class
LB	1	John Holmes	Fr
DB	3	Larry Williams	So
DB	4	Jahmile Addae (C)	Sr
DB	6	Antonio Lewis	So
DB	8	Thandi Smith	Sr
DB	13	Aaron Meckstroth	So
DB	15	Dee McCann	Sr
DB	17	George Shehl	Sr
DB	18	Abraham Jones	Jr
DB	19	Vaughn Rivers	So

Special teams

Pos.	#	Name	Class
P	7	Kash Kiefer	Fr
P	16	Scott Kozlowski	Fr
K	18	Colby James	So
K	29	Kyle Chilton	Fr
P	37	Scott Kozlowski	Fr
P	38	Phil Brady	Sr
K	40	Pat McAfee	Fr
LS	46	Adam Hughes	Fr
LS	77	Tim Lindsey	Jr

Head coach

- Rich Rodriguez

Coordinators/assistant coaches

- Jeff Casteel - Defensive Coordinator, Linebackers
- Tony Gibson - Defensive Backs
- Herb Hand – Recruiting Coordinator, Tight Ends
- Butch Jones – Wide Receivers
- Bill Kirelawich – Defensive Line
- Calvin Magee - Offensive Coordinator, Running Backs
- Bill Stewart - Quarterbacks, Special Teams Coordinator
- Bruce Tall - Safeties
- Rick Trickett - Assistant Head Coach, Offensive Line
- Travis Trickett - Student Assistant Coach

Legend

- (C) Team captain
- (S) Suspended
- (I) Ineligible
- Injured
- Redshirt

Roster

== Statistics ==
=== Team ===
Team Statistics
	West Virginia	Opponents
Points	385	214
First Downs	225	212
Rushing	150	91
Passing	64	110
Penalty	9	11
Rushing Yards	3269	1316
Rushing Attempts	625	452
Average Per Rush	5.2	2.9
Long	76	
Rushing TDs	34	14
Passing Yards	1398	2413
Comp–Att	122-193	221-370
Comp %	63.2	59.7
Average Per Game	116.5	201.8
Average per Attempt	7.2	6.5
Passing TDs	12	12
INTs	7	17
Rating	137.3	116.0
Touchdowns	50	26
Passing	12	12
Rushing	34	14
Defensive	2	0
Interceptions	17	7
Yards	151	76
Long	40	
Total Offense	4667	3729
Total Plays	818	822
Average Per Yards/Game	388.9	310.8
Kick Returns: # – Yards	32-738	44-847
TDs	0	0
Long	41	
Punts	56	67
Yards	2184	2642
Average	39.0	39.4
Punt Returns: # – Yards	23-358	21-162
TDs	2	0
Long	76	
Fumbles – Fumbles Lost	19-10	35-14
Opposing TDs	0	0
Penalties – Yards	82-697	62-495
3rd–Down Conversion %	42.5	36.9
4th–Down Conversion %	64.3	45.5
Takeaways	31	17
Field Goals	11	12
Extra Point	48	22
Sacks	29	18
Yards	144	95

=== Offense ===
Passing
#	Player	Pos	Cmp	Att	Pct	Yds	Y/A	TD	Int	Rate
5	Pat White	QB	65	114	57.0	828	7.3	8	5	132.4
11	Adam Bednarik	QB	55	75	73.3	532	7.1	4	2	145.2
12	J.R. House	QB	2	4	50.0	123	9.5	0	0	129.8
	Totals		122	193	63.2	1398	7.2	12	7	137.3

Rushing
#	Player	Pos	Att	Yds	Y/A	Long	TD
10	Steve Slaton	RB	205	1128	5.5	52	17
5	Pat White	QB	131	952	7.3	76	7
35	Owen Schmitt	FB	48	380	7.9	54	2
30	Pernell Williams	RB	67	197	2.9	19	2
14	Jason Gwaltney	RB	45	186	4.1	24	3
11	Adam Bednarik	QB	56	170	3.0	27	1
24	Jason Colson	RB	43	120	2.8	11	1
2	Darius Reynaud	WR	9	86	9.6	27	1
34	Arlen Dorsey	RB	7	29	4.1	10	0
12	J.R. House	QB	2	16	8.0	13	0
38	Phil Brady	P	1	10	10.0	10	0
28	Jeremy Bruce	WR	1	9	9.0	9	0
19	Vaughn Rivers	CB	2	8	4.0	4	0
	Totals		625	3269	5.2	76	34
