= Pat White =

American football player and coach (born 1986)

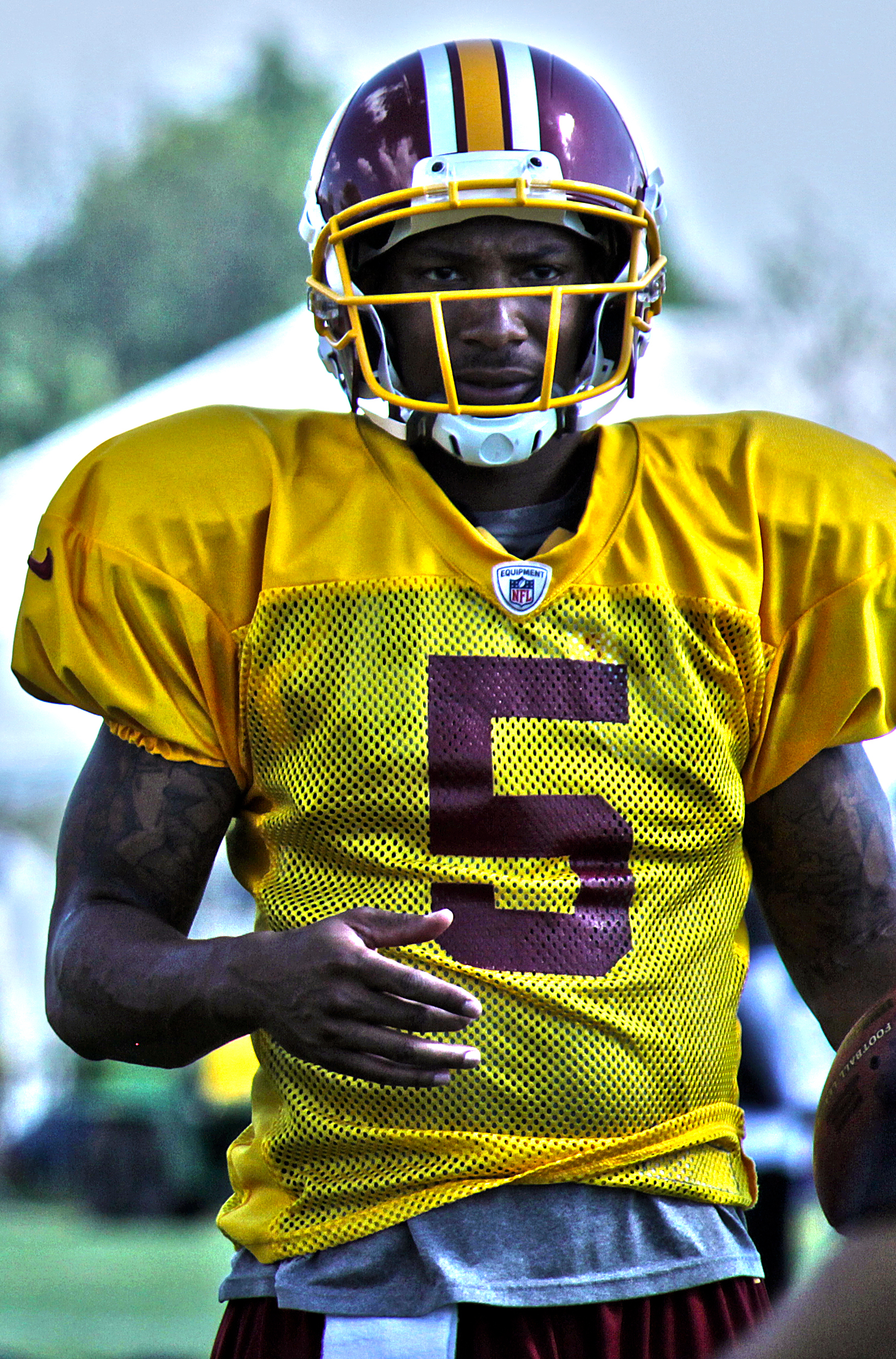
- White with the Washington Redskins in 2013

West Virginia Mountaineers
- Title: Assistant quarterbacks coach & assistant to the head coach

Personal information
- Born: February 25, 1986 (age 40); Daphne, Alabama, U.S.
- Listed height: 6 ft 0 in (1.83 m)
- Listed weight: 205 lb (93 kg)

Career information
- Position: Quarterback (No. 6, 5)
- High school: Daphne
- College: West Virginia (2004–2008)
- NFL draft: 2009: 2nd round, 44th overall pick

Career history

Playing
- Miami Dolphins (2009); Virginia Destroyers (2011)*; Washington Redskins (2013); Edmonton Eskimos (2014)
- * Offseason or practice squad member only

Coaching
- Alcorn State (2018–2019) Quarterbacks coach; South Florida (2020) Running backs coach; Alabama State (2021) Quarterbacks coach; Los Angeles Chargers (2022–2023) Offensive assistant; West Virginia (2025–present) Assistant quarterbacks coach & assistant to the head coach

Awards and highlights
- 2× Big East Offensive Player of the Year (2006, 2007); 3× First-team All-Big East (2006–2008); West Virginia Mountaineers No. 5 retired

Career NFL statistics
- Pass attempts: 5
- Pass completions: 0
- Rushing yards: 81
- Stats at Pro Football Reference

Career CFL statistics
- Pass attempts: 9
- Pass completions: 5
- TD–INT: 1–0
- Passing yards: 54
- Rushing yards: 159
- Rushing touchdowns: 4

Patrick Christian White (born February 25, 1986) is an American former professional football player who was a quarterback in the National Football League (NFL) and Canadian Football League (CFL). He played college football for the West Virginia Mountaineers, and set the FBS record for career rushing yards by a quarterback. He was selected by the Miami Dolphins in the second round of the 2009 NFL draft. White was a backup for the Dolphins in 2009, and for the Washington Redskins in 2013. He finished his playing career as a backup for the CFL's Edmonton Eskimos in 2014. He is currently an assistant coach for the West Virginia Mountaineers.

== Early life ==
White was voted 3rd in the Mr. Football for Alabama his senior high school season. His senior season he rushed for 1,905 yards and 31 touchdowns at Daphne High. He also passed for 1,488 yards and 15 touchdowns. He became a class 6-A All-State first team for football, but played pitcher and outfield in baseball as well, winning two state championships.

White was being pursued by West Virginia, Auburn, Kentucky, LSU, Mississippi State, and Vanderbilt. However, West Virginia University promised White a chance to play quarterback in college. He originally had committed to LSU as a wide receiver but changed his mind and signed his letter of intent to WVU.

== College career ==
=== 2005 ===
White passed up a career in affiliated baseball and a six-figure contract with the Anaheim Angels to play college football. He began the season as a co-starter along with Adam Bednarik. He started his season out against Syracuse, with 63 yards passing and 20 yards rushing. In the 35–7 victory over Wofford, White passed for 82 yards on six passes out of 10, and rushed for 107 yards and a score. In the 31–19 victory over Maryland, White rushed for 62 yards on nine carries. In the 20–15 victory over ECU, White scored his first ever passing touchdown of his collegiate career and added 64 yards passing. In the 34–17 loss to Virginia Tech, White came into the game in the second half. He totaled 9 passes out of 11 attempts for 85 yards for two touchdowns and 44 yards on the ground.

White's shared time with Bednarik continued until the seventh game of the season against Louisville. With WVU down 24–7, White came in to replace an injured Bednarik and led the Mountaineers to a 46–44, triple overtime victory. He teamed-up with freshman running back Steve Slaton to lead the Mountaineers with his 118 total yards on the game, while Slaton scored a Big East record 6 touchdowns. The game marked the first major game in the duo's memorable career together. The next game, the 45–13 victory over Connecticut, White totaled 106 passing yards and a touchdown, along with 63 rushing yards and two touchdowns for a total of 169 yards and three scores. In the 38–0 victory over Cincinnati, White passed for 100 yards and a score and rushed for 111 yards on only eight carries for 211 total yards. It marked the first 200-yard game of his career. One of White's best games in the tenure before the bowl game was against Pittsburgh in the Backyard Brawl rivalry game. He threw for 41 yards and a touchdown, and ran for 220 yards and 2 touchdowns in the 45–13 win. It was only White's second career 200-yard game and it had come consecutively to his previous 200-yard game against Cincinnati. Against USF, White led the Mountaineers to their first undefeated Big East season since 1993 with a 177-yard, two touchdown rushing performance. He had the longest rush of his career to date, a 76-yard run, and also totaled 89 yards and score through the air for his third consecutive 200-yard game of his freshman season.

With White now the starting quarterback, the Mountaineers won the rest of their games to win the Big East Conference title and earn a bid to the 2006 Sugar Bowl against the Georgia Bulldogs. In what was essentially a home game for the Bulldogs as the Sugar Bowl was moved to the Georgia Dome due to Hurricane Katrina, White had what many described as his "coming-out party", rushing for 77 yards and throwing for 120 yards and a touchdown in WVU's 38–35 win against the Bulldogs. That season, he passed for 828 yards and 8 touchdowns. He also rushed for 952 yards and 7 touchdowns, which was then a new Big East and WVU record for quarterback rushing yards in a season. He also had three consecutive 200-yard games, which ended when he came short with 197 yards in the Sugar Bowl.

White and Steve Slaton ended the season with 2,995 total yards and 24 touchdowns between the two players.

=== 2006 ===
White, running back Steve Slaton, and fullback Owen Schmitt were featured on one of the six regional covers of the August 21, 2006, issue of Sports Illustrated, as part of their "Big Men On Campus" article and their 2006–2007 college football season preview. Slaton was named West Virginia's "Big Man On Campus" in the same issue. White was named as one of 35 players to watch for the Walter Camp Football Foundation Player of the Year award.

White followed up a tremendous freshman season with a great sophomore season, in which he passed for 1,655 yards and 13 TDs and rushed for 1,219 yards and 18 touchdowns on his way to being named the Big East Offensive Player of the Year and was named to the first-team all-Big East squad. He was considered the leader of the team and his three best performances of the year came in the Gator Bowl, in the loss to Louisville when White continued to try to come back late in the game, and against Pittsburgh in the annual rivalry game, a 45–27 win, when he threw for 204 yards and two touchdowns, and ran for 220 yards and two touchdowns. His 200+ rushing and passing yards makes him one of only eight players in NCAA history to do so in a game. He was also caught on camera mocking the Pitt Panther growl by a national ESPN audience in that game. Pittsburgh linebacker H. B. Blades, who was an all-Big East selection that season, said, "Pat White is the best quarterback in college football," after the loss. In the Gator Bowl against Georgia Tech, White battled ankle, neck, and wrist injuries and a 35–17 third-quarter deficit to bring the Mountaineers back to win 38–35 without the help of back Steve Slaton, who was out with injuries as well. White took the ball on 10 of the last 12 plays, gaining 54 yards and four first downs, to run out the clock for the Mountaineers. Georgia Tech linebacker Philip Wheeler said when asked the three players he liked to watch in college football, "Three? Forget it. How about one? Pat White. Dude is unbelievable. I mean, he can do it all. He's fast, he stronger than he looks and he can throw it. Yeah, I love watching him – as long as he's not doing it to us." Also against Syracuse, White rushed for a career-high 247 yards and scored four touchdowns.

White earned the Alabama Athlete of the Year award on May 8, 2007, for his sophomore season. He was also granted the key to his hometown of Daphne. White's all-purpose offense total of 2,878 yards is ranked third on the most total offense yards in a season in West Virginia school history, while his 1,219 rushing yards is the most ever in a season by a West Virginia quarterback, breaking his 2005 record. His 18 rushing touchdowns is tied for a school record in a season with running backs Ira Errett Rodgers and Amos Zereoué.

White and running back Steve Slaton combined for 2,963 yards and 31 touchdowns rushing in the season. They totaled 4,978 total yards and 49 touchdowns together on the season, the second-best output between the two in their three-year career together.

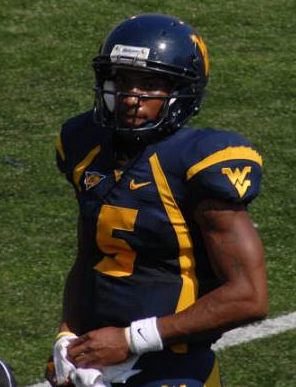
White in 2007

=== 2007 ===
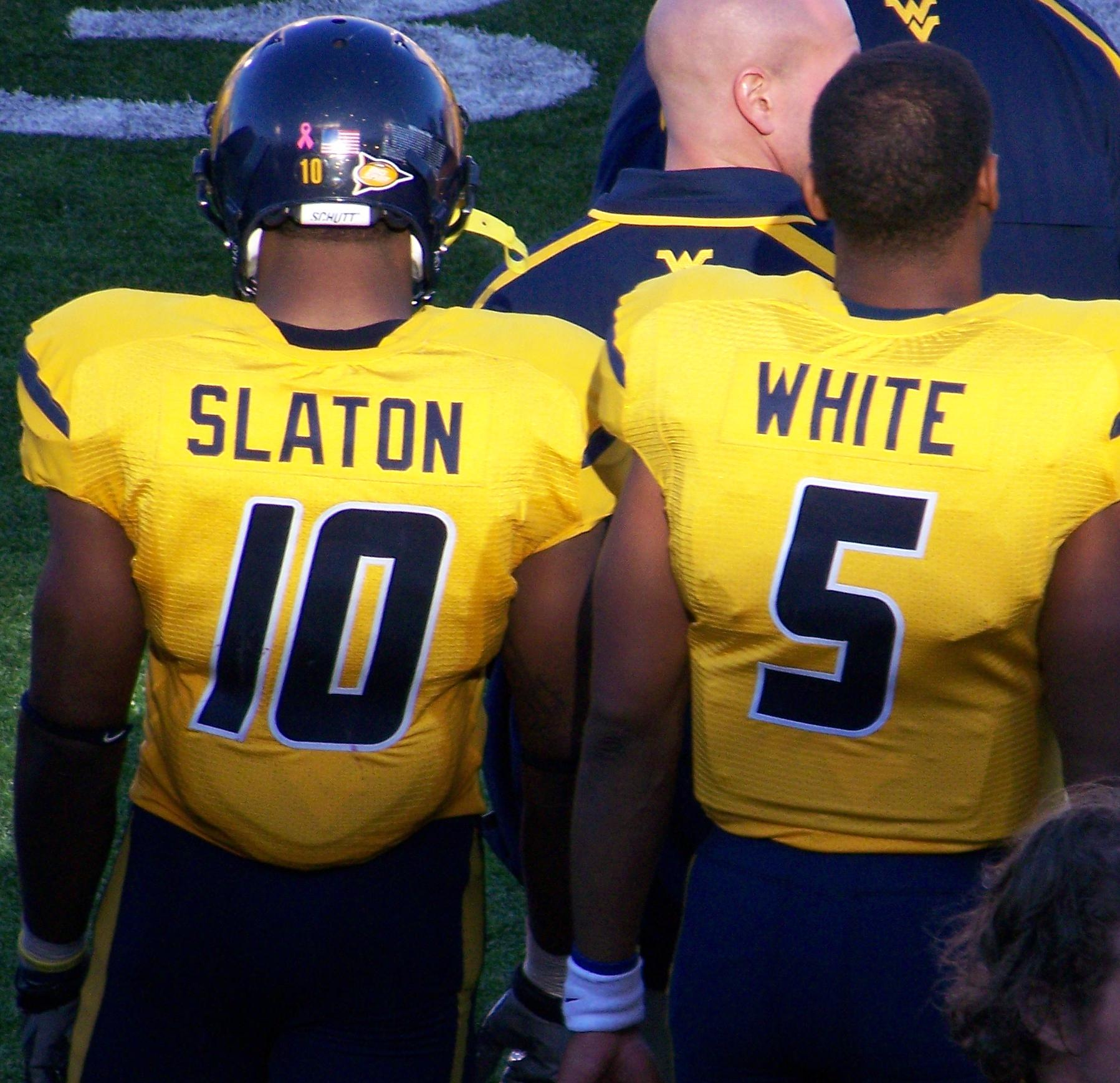
Steve Slaton (left) and White on the sideline of the Mississippi State game.

In the season opener against Western Michigan, White ended the day going 10-of-18 with 192 yards and two touchdowns through the air, also rushing for 98 yards and two touchdowns as the Mountaineers won 62–24. White's first rushing touchdown was a 38-yard scramble. In the next week against Marshall, the Mountaineers pulled away in the second half with 42 points to win the game 48–23. White led West Virginia to the win with 149 passing yards and two touchdowns and 125 rushing yards and a touchdown – WVU's first score of the game coming off of White's 46-yard pass to Darius Reynaud. In the third game of the season against Maryland, White was eight of thirteen passing with 92 yards and eleven rushes for 22 yards and a touchdown in the 31–14 win. In the following contest against ECU, White went 18-of-20 with 186 yards and two touchdown passes and nine rushes for 44 yards and two touchdowns. White's 90% passing accuracy tied a school record set in 1970, and he completed passes to eight different receivers.

The Mountaineers' lost against USF 21–13 at South Florida the following game. White was injured in the game, but went 12–18 for 100 yards, although throwing his first interception on the season. The next game against Syracuse in a 55–14 win, White went 12–15 with 148 yards for a touchdown before injuring his shoulder. He also had 89 yards and a touchdown on 14 carries while being named Big East Player of the Week. At homecoming against Mississippi State, White only played the first half of the 38–13 blowout of the Bulldogs – totaling 8-of-12 passing with 61 yards and a touchdown and had five rushes for 89 yards, including a 64-yard run on the first play of the game for a touchdown. In New Jersey against #25 Rutgers, White threw for 144 yards while going 10-of-16, also rushing for 156 yards on 22 carries for a touchdown – accounting for 300 total yards of offense in the 31–3 win. Against Louisville, White led the Mountaineers to a 38–31 dramatic win. With the game tied 31–31 with less than two minutes less, White ran 50 yards for the game-winning touchdown – finishing the game by going 16-of-25 for 181 yards and two touchdowns while rushing for 147 yards on 24 carries and a touchdown (328 total yards), while also being awarded the Player of the Game honor from ESPN and named Big East Offensive Player of the Week.

In the 28–23 win on the road against #22 Cincinnati, White led the Mountaineers to the victory by going 13-of-19 for 140 passing yards with an interception and rushing 27 times for 155 yards and two touchdowns, a total of 295 total offensive yards. His 155 rushing yards put him over Vince Young on the career NCAA quarterback rushing list as he moved to over 3,000 career rushing yards, the first Big East quarterback ever to do so. White and the Mountaineers wrapped up the 2007 Big East Championship with their 66–21 win over #20 Connecticut. White ended the game by going 9 of 13 for 107 yards for a touchdown, but throwing a late interception, and running 16 times for 186 yards and 2 touchdowns. He ended the game with a total of 293 yards and three total touchdowns. White also passed former Mountaineer quarterback Rasheed Marshall to become the school leader for the most total touchdowns.

WVU entered the game against Pittsburgh as 28 point favorites to win the 100th Backyard Brawl and earn a berth in the BCS championship game. The Mountaineers, however, could never get their high-powered offense going against the Panthers and were hurt by fumbles, missed field goals, a run game they could not stop, and a thumb injury to the non-throwing hand of White. Trailing by one possession late in the fourth quarter (Pat White's backup had scored the only touchdown for West Virginia), West Virginia twice had the ball in Pitt territory. White had just returned but both times failed to convert on fourth down plays. The final Pitt possession saw the underdogs run the ball out of the back of the end zone for a safety as the clock expired. West Virginia kicker Pat McAfee missed two field goals in the game and Pitt's kicker missed one. The loss cost his team a place in the national championship game.

In the 48–28 Fiesta Bowl victory over Oklahoma under interim head coach Bill Stewart, White earned the MVP award after passing for 176 yards and two touchdowns and rushing for 150 yards – his sixth career 300-yard game effort. White was named to the ESPN All-Bowl Team following the bowl season, being the only quarterback on the list. ESPN ranked White's performance in the Fiesta Bowl as the #9 best in BCS bowl game history.

=== 2008 ===
White was named to the Preseason All-American team. To open up the 2008 football season under head coach Bill Stewart, West Virginia defeated the Villanova Wildcats 48–21. White finished the day by completing 25 of 33 passes for 208 yards and a career-best and stadium-record five touchdowns, while also rushing for 63 yards. White's five passing touchdowns before a sell-out crowd is second-best in school history only to Marc Bulger's six in 1998, and his completions and attempts were also career-highs. In the following game against ECU, White was 11-of-18 for 72 yards and rushed 20 times for 97 yards in the 24–3 loss, for a total of only 169 yards of offense. West Virginia followed-up their loss to ECU with a 17–14 loss in overtime to Colorado, in which White rushed for 149 yards and two touchdowns and passed for 43 yards on 10-of-14 passing. White's 149 yards rushing led the team and his two touchdowns were the only scores of the game for WVU. Following the Colorado game, White completed 17 out of 21 passes for 130 yards and two touchdowns and also rushed 11 times for 61 yards against Marshall.

West Virginia began Big East play with a 24–17 victory over Rutgers, in which White was 12-of-17 for 137 yards and two touchdowns passing and rushed 11 times for 59 yards before being taken out in the 3rd quarter after being injured. However, White sat out for the Syracuse game with a head injury, but the Mountaineers won 17–6 – snapping White's consecutive starting streak of 19 games. White started the following game against Auburn, in which the Mountaineers won 34–17. White had two interceptions early in the game, but finished the victory with 174 yards and three touchdowns on 13-of-21 passing. West Virginia then defeated #25 Connecticut 35–13, picking up the team's first road victory of the season. In the win, White completed 11 of 18 passes for 121 yards and a touchdown and rushed 21 times for 109 yards and two touchdowns. White finished the game with 230 total yards and three touchdowns – earning him Big East Offensive Player of the Week honors. However, the Mountaineers then lost the following Big East matchup against the Cincinnati Bearcats, 26–23 in overtime after a late comeback. White finished the game 20 of 38 passing for 219 yards with two touchdowns and an interception, and also rushed 20 times for 41 yards – totaling 260 total yards in the loss. White's 38 passing attempts was a career-high.

White and the Mountaineers followed their loss with a 35–21 victory over Louisville in their annual series. White finished the game with 122 yards on 6-of-11 passing for two touchdowns and a season-high 200 yards on 21 carries for three touchdowns, including a 66-yard touchdown run. White's 200 rushing yards broke the NCAA record for most rushing yards in a career by a quarterback, passing Brad Smith for first place with his then-total of 4,292 yards. White's 5 total touchdowns (all of West Virginia's scores in the game), also made him become the most prolific scorer in Big East history, passing Donovan McNabb's 10-year record of 96 total touchdowns responsible for. Following White's record-setting performance against Louisville, the Mountaineers were defeated by Pittsburgh in the Backyard Brawl to the score of 19–15. White finished the loss by going 15 of 28 passing for 143 yards with two interceptions and 12 rushes for 93 yards and a touchdown – a 54-yard scramble. White's 54-yard run was the seventh longest of his career and second longest of 2008, but his two picks allowed Pitt back to finish the comeback win.

For White's final regular season game as a Mountaineer, at home against South Florida, West Virginia promoted a "White-Out" to honor his career. In his Senior Night performance, a 13–7 victory over South Florida, White passed for 141 yards and a touchdown and rushed for 40 yards on a snow-covered field to finish his career at West Virginia in front of 48,000 white-clad fans. The Mountaineers' lone touchdown in the win, White's pass, was his 100th career touchdown and credited him with the milestone of 10,000 career total yards. Prior to the game, WVU managers scraped out the number 5 in the middle of the field in snow and formed a "5" in the student section with T-shirts before it opened for fans.

White finished his collegiate career in the Meineke Car Care Bowl against North Carolina. White passed for a career-high 332 yards and three touchdowns on 26-of-32 attempts, also rushing 21 times for 55 yards, as the Mountaineers defeated the Tar Heels 31–30. In the victory, White became the first player in college football history to win four bowl games as a starting quarterback and was named the game MVP for the third consecutive bowl game.

White ended his senior season with career-highs of 1,844 yards and 21 touchdowns on 180-of-274 passing with seven interceptions through the air and 974 yards rushing on 180 attempts for 8 touchdowns – totaling 2,818 yards and 29 touchdowns on offense. White finished his career with 6,051 yards and 56 touchdowns passing and 4,480 yards and 47 touchdowns rushing – a total of 10,531 yards and 103 touchdowns over his career. White also finished his career sixth in the NCAA among the most career victories as a starting quarterback with 34 overall. In spite of all his accomplishments, White was never an NCAA All-American so he is not eligible for the College Football Hall of Fame.

=== Awards and honors ===
2005

- ESPN.com all-Big East
- Freshman All-American
- Two-time Big East Player of the Week
- WVU Coaches Contribution Award

2006

- Walter Camp Award watchlist
- Two-time Big East Player of the Week
- first-team All-Big East
- first-team All-ECAC
- Big East Offensive Player of the Year
- West Virginia University MVP
- Gator Bowl MVP
- Davey O'Brien Award semifinalist
- Alabama Athlete of the Year
- West Virginia Amateur Athlete of the Year

2007

- Three-time Big East Player of the Week
- Four-time WVU Offensive Player of the Week
- first-team All-Big East
- Big East Offensive Player of the Year
- West Virginia University MVP
- Davey O'Brien Award semifinalist
- Walter Camp Award semifinalist
- Heisman Trophy 6th Place
- Hardman Award
- ESPN All-Bowl Team
- Archie Griffin Award
- 2008 Fiesta Bowl MVP
- West Virginia Amateur Athlete of the Year

2008

- Hardman Award
- Johnny Unitas Golden Arm Award finalist
- West Virginia University MVP
- First-team All-Big East
- Heisman Trophy 7th place
- Meineke Car Care Bowl MVP
- 2009 Senior Bowl MVP
- West Virginia Amateur Athlete of the Year

2026

- Pat White's No. 5 jersey was retired by WVU.

=== Records ===
- Has started a total of 40 games during his 4-year career.
- Starting record of 35–8 is unmatched by any quarterback in WVU history and sixth in the NCAA in most career victories as a starting quarterback.
- First quarterback to have started and won 4 consecutive bowl games.
- His 4,480 career yards rushing are the third most among any quarterback in FBS history.
- He has accounted for 100+ touchdowns, which is a Big East record for any position.

==== Game ====
- One of only nine players in NCAA history to rush for 200 yards and pass for 200 yards in a game (Pitt 2006, 220 rushing and 204 passing)
- Highest single-game rushing total by a quarterback in Big East history – 247 yards against Syracuse on October 14, 2006
- Tied for most yards of total offense in a single-game in WVU history – 424 yards against Pittsburgh in 2006
- Fourth highest single game rushing total in WVU history – 247 Rushing Yards against Syracuse on October 14, 2006
- Has three of the top seven highest rushing games in WVU history – #4: 247 yards against Syracuse on October 14, 2006, (tied) #7: 220 yards against Pitt on November 24, 2005, #7: 220 yards at Pitt on November 16, 2006.

==== Season ====
- First in rushing yards in a season by a WVU quarterback (2007) – 1,335 yards
- Second in rushing yards in a season by a WVU quarterback (2006) – 1,219 yards
- Third in rushing yards in a season by a WVU quarterback (2005) – 952 yards
- First (tied) in rushing touchdowns in WVU history (2006) – 18 touchdowns
- Second most rushing yards in a season by a freshman in West Virginia school history (2005) – 952 yards
- Second in Season Total Yards Gained in WVU history (2007) – 3,059 yards
- Fourth in Season Total Yards Gained in WVU history (2006) – 2,874 yards
- Fourth in Season Total Passing Touchdowns in WVU history (2008) – 18 touchdowns
- Sixth in NCAA single-season quarterback rushing list in yardage (2007) – 1,335 yards
- Sixth in Season Rushing yards in WVU history (2007) – 1,335 yards
- Second best passing efficiency in a season at WVU (2006) – 159.73 rating
- Fifth best passing efficiency in a season at WVU (2007) – 151.40 rating

==== Career passing stats ====
- Second in passing efficiency at WVU with a career quarterback rating of 147.62
- Second in completion percentage in WVU history by completing 64.6% of his passes
- Second most in WVU history in passing touchdowns – 52 touchdowns
- Second all-time in WVU pass completions – 467 completions
- Fourth all-time in WVU passing yards – 5,576 yards
- Fifth all-time in WVU pass attempts – 728 attempts

==== Career rushing stats ====
- First in NCAA career quarterback rushing list in yardage – 4,480 yards
- First in Big East and WVU career rushing yardage record for a quarterback – 4,480 yards
- First in most 200-yard rushing game in a career in WVU history – 4 games
- Second in total rushing yards in WVU history – 4,480 yards
- Second in total career rushing touchdowns in WVU history – 47 touchdowns
- Fourth in total rushing attempts in WVU history – 648 attempts
- Fourth in WVU career 100 yard rushing games – 18
- Fourth in WVU career all-purpose rushing yardage – 4,480 yards
- First in 200 yard rushing games at WVU with 4 total
- Third duo (along with Steve Slaton) in FBS history to rush for 1,000 yards in consecutive seasons

==== Career passing/rushing combined ====
- First in total offensive yards in a career in WVU history – 10,529 yards
- First in total touchdowns responsible for in WVU and Big East history – 103 touchdowns
- Fourth player in NCAA history with 40+ rushing and 40+ passing touchdowns in a career
- Second player in NCAA history with 4,000+ rushing yards and 5,000+ passing yards.
- One of five players in NCAA history to rush for 1,000 yards and pass for 1,000 yards in a season. (Accomplished twice, 2006 and 2007)

==== Versus ranked opponents ====
- Has a W/L record of 7–2 against top 25 ranked opponents.
- Has a W/L record of 2–1 against top 10 ranked opponents.
- Has a W/L record of 1–0 against top 5 ranked opponents.

==== Bowl games ====
- White is 4–0 as a starter in bowl games, 2–0 in BCS Bowl Games, becoming the first starting quarterback in college football history to do so.
- Joins Georgia's David Greene, Tennessee's Peyton Manning and Nebraska's David Humm to win three New Year's Day bowl games.
- Led WVU to an upset victory over the #9 ranked SEC Champion Georgia Bulldogs in the 2006 BCS Nokia Sugar Bowl.
- Led WVU to an 18-point come-from-behind victory over ACC runner-up Georgia Tech in the 2007 Gator Bowl.
- Led WVU to a stunning 20 point upset over #4 ranked Big 12 Champion Oklahoma Sooners in the 2008 BCS Tostitos Fiesta Bowl.
- Was named 2007 Gator Bowl MVP.
- Was named 2008 Fiesta Bowl MVP.
- 79-yard touchdown pass in 2008 Fiesta Bowl is longest pass play in WVU Bowl history.
- Ran for a team-high 150 yards in Fiesta Bowl victory over Oklahoma.
- Was named 2009 Meineke Car Care Bowl player of the game.
- Set career highs with 26 completions and 332 yards passing in final game (Meineike Bowl)
- 387 total yards against North Carolina was fifth-best single-game total in WVU history

=== Statistics ===
Regular and post season

WVU		Passing								Rushing
Season	Games	Comp-Att	Yds	YPA	YPC	Comp %	TD	INT	Long	Rush	Yds	Avg	Lg	TD
2005	12	65–114	828	7.26	12.74	57.0%	8	5	50	131	952	7.3	76	7
2006	12	129–179	1,655	9.25	14.03	69.9%	13	7	67	165	1,219	7.4	69	18
2007	13	144–216	1,734	7.98	11.97	66.7%	14	4	79	197	1,335	6.8	64	14
2008	12	180–274	1,842	6.72	10.23	65.7%	21	7	52	191	974	5.1	66	8
Total	49	507–783	6,049	8.31	11.93	64.8 %	56	23	79	684	4,480	6.5	76	47

Bowl games

WVU						Passing							Rushing
Year	Record	Game	Win/Loss	Opponent	Score	Comp-Att	Yds	Avg	Comp %	TD	INT	Long	Rush	Yds	Avg	Lg	TD
Jan. 2006	11–1	Sugar Bowl	WIN	Georgia	38–35	11–14	120	8.6	78.6%	1	0	30	24	77	3.2	13	0
Jan. 2007	11–2	Gator Bowl	WIN	Georgia Tech	38–35	9–15	131	8.7	60.0%	2	0	58	22	145	6.6	27	1
Jan. 2008	11–2	Fiesta Bowl	WIN	Oklahoma	48–28	10–19	176	9.3	52.6%	2	0	79	20	150	7.5	42	0
Dec. 2008	9–4	Meineke Bowl	WIN	N. Carolina	31–30	26–32	332	10.4	81.3%	3	1	44	21	55	2.6	16	0
Total	42–9	----	4–0	----	----	56–80	759	8.9	70.0%	8	1	79	87	427	4.9	42	1

== Professional football career ==
=== Pre-draft ===
Following the end of the regular season in his senior season of 2008, White was offered and accepted a bid to the Senior Bowl, where he worked out for scouts at quarterback. NFL Network's Mike Mayock predicted White to be the Senior Bowl MVP and be a 2nd round selection, while Mel Kiper, Jr. selected White as his #5 quarterback prospect in the class. White finished the Senior Bowl going 4 of 9 passing for 95 yards with a touchdown and 31 yards rushing on three rushes – totaling 126 yards with a touchdown. He led two scoring drives, including a 39-yard touchdown pass, en route to being named the 2009 Senior Bowl MVP.

White officially received an invitation to the 2009 NFL Combine. Prior to Combine workouts, he told reporters that he was willing to play other positions besides quarterback in the NFL – although White was praised for his workouts at quarterback. On top of other praise, White as the co-winner of the General Motors Top Combine Performer. On March 3, 2009, White joined the NFL Total Access cast on NFL Network. On March 12, White worked out at his Pro Day exclusively at quarterback, contrary to reports that he would run routes as a receiver and return punts. Soon after, White appeared in a spread for ESPN The Magazine's April 20 feature.

Pre-draft measurables
Height	Weight	Arm length	Hand span	40-yard dash	10-yard split	20-yard split	20-yard shuttle	Three-cone drill	Vertical jump	Broad jump
6 ft 0 1/4 in (1.84 m)	197 lb (89 kg)	33 1/2 in (0.85 m)	9 1/4 in (0.23 m)	4.55 s	1.67 s	2.70 s	4.42 s	7.06 s	35 in (0.89 m)	9 ft 9 in (2.97 m)
All values from NFL Combine

=== Miami Dolphins ===
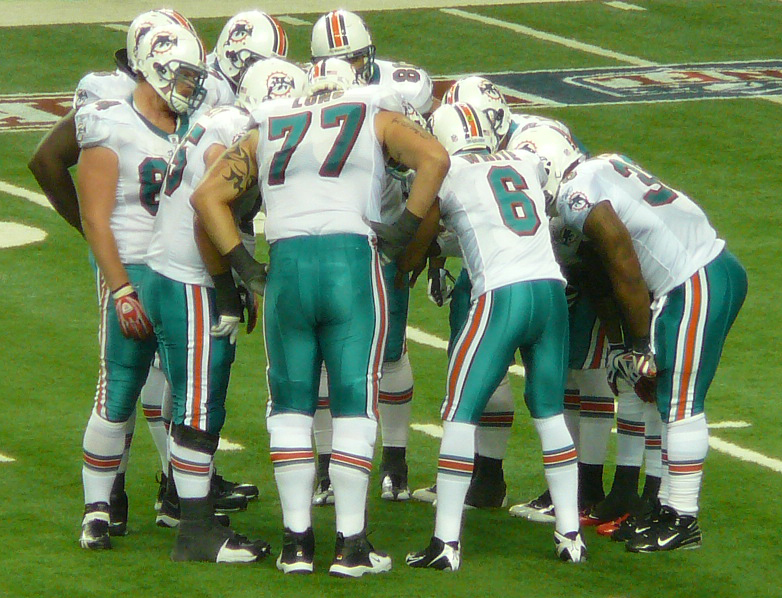
White (#6) with the Dolphins in 2009

White was selected by the Miami Dolphins with the 44th overall pick of the 2009 NFL draft, through a pick acquired from the Washington Redskins in a trade that sent Jason Taylor to Washington. After being drafted, Dolphins' general manager Jeff Ireland stated that White would be in competition for the starting quarterback job with Chad Pennington and Chad Henne, while also being used in the Wildcat formation (effectively making it a spread), and as a receiver. On August 1, 2009, the Dolphins agreed to terms with White on a four-year deal worth around $4.5 million. The deal included $2.4 million in guaranteed money.

In the opening preseason game against the Jaguars, White was 2-of-7 passing for 14 yards and one interception (after it was tipped by the receiver). He also had six rushing attempts for 20 yards.

White's first big play was set up in shotgun formation in Week 9 against the New England Patriots. The play was an option but White kept it himself and rushed for 33 yards before being stopped.

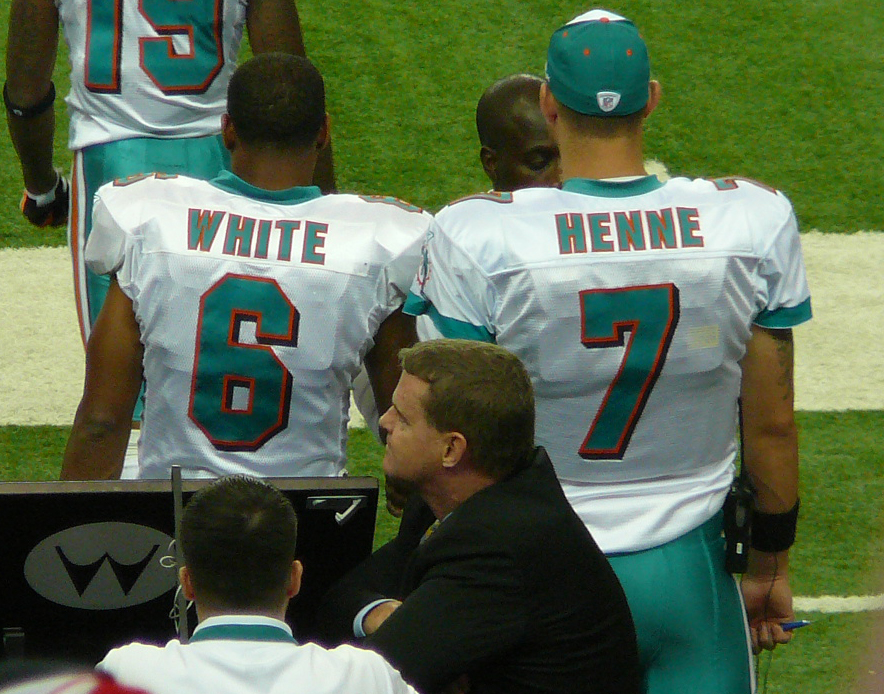
White (left) with fellow Dolphins quarterback Chad Henne in 2009

In a game against the Pittsburgh Steelers on January 3, 2010, White suffered a helmet-to-helmet collision when, after being tripped, Ike Taylor hit him in the head and left him unconscious where he was carted off the field.

White was released from the hospital the next day and drove himself to the Dolphins Training facility in Davie, Florida where he participated in team meetings just prior to the team breaking for the 2010 off-season. In July 2010, Ricky Williams said that White was the most improved player on the team.

White would make two preseason appearances in 2010 prior to being waived on September 4.

=== Virginia Destroyers ===
White was signed by the Virginia Destroyers of the United Football League on June 28, 2011. He was cut on September 1, 2011.

=== Washington Redskins ===
After not playing professional football for two years, White agreed to sign with the Washington Redskins on April 2, 2013. He made four preseason appearances, including one start. For the regular season opener, White was on the Redskins' inactive list as the fourth-string quarterback behind third-stringer Rex Grossman, backup Kirk Cousins, and starter Robert Griffin III. White was then waived on September 14, 2013.

=== Edmonton Eskimos ===
White signed with the Edmonton Eskimos of the Canadian Football League (CFL) on March 27, 2014. In his first and only season in the CFL, White completed 5-of-9 passes for 54 yards with a touchdown. He also carried the ball for 159 yards on 35 carries (4.54-yard average) with 4 touchdowns.

On March 20, 2015, while still under contract to the Eskimos, White announced his retirement from professional football.

== Professional baseball career ==
White was selected by the Los Angeles Angels in the 4th round of the 2004 Major League Baseball draft. He was offered a six-figure signing bonus, but declined in order to attend West Virginia. He was drafted again in 2007 (Angels), 2008 (Cincinnati Reds), and 2009 (New York Yankees), but did not sign with any of those teams.

After he was waived by the Dolphins, White signed a minor league contract with the Kansas City Royals on September 10, 2010. He participated in the Fall instructional league. On January 25, 2013, White was signed by the Miami Marlins to a minor league contract.

== Coaching career ==
On April 18, 2018, White was hired to be the quarterbacks coach at Alcorn State. He joined his former WVU teammate Ryan Stanchek, who was at the time Alcorn's offensive coordinator.

On January 2, 2020, after spending the past two seasons at Alcorn State, White was hired to coach the running backs group at South Florida. Reports came out that White was no longer a member of the USF coaching staff after the 2020 season. White would be hired as quarterbacks coach at Alabama State, serving there in the 2021 season, and after that season taking the same position at another FCS school, Campbell.

On July 25, 2022, White was hired as an offensive assistant for the Los Angeles Chargers.

On February, 16, 2025, Pat White was hired as an assistant quarterbacks coach and assistant to the head coach by West Virginia coach Rich Rodriguez.

== Personal life ==
White's first child, Daphne Ruth White, was born on May 21, 2014.

His second daughter, Clara, was born in March 2018. He married Cristina Chavarria in June 2020. He has since had two more children, Patrick White Jr and Dubois White.

White is a distant cousin of former NFL running back T. J. Yeldon.
