= 2008 Meineke Car Care Bowl =

North Carolina Tar Heels	West Virginia Mountaineers
(8–4)	(8–4)
ACC	Big East
30	31
Head coach: Butch Davis	Head coach: Bill Stewart
	1	2	3	4	Total
North Carolina	14	9	7	0	30
West Virginia	21	0	3	7	31
- Date: December 27, 2008
- Season: 2008
- Stadium: Bank of America Stadium
- Location: Charlotte, North Carolina
- MVP: QB Pat White (West Virginia)
- Referee: Marc Curles (SEC)
- Attendance: 73,712
- Payout: US$1,000,000 per team

United States TV coverage
- Network: ESPN
- Announcers: Sean McDonough (Play by Play); Chris Spielman (Analyst); Rob Stone (Sideline)
- Nielsen ratings: 3.9

The 2008 Meineke Car Care Bowl was the seventh edition of the college football bowl game, and was played at Bank of America Stadium in Charlotte, North Carolina. The game started at 1:00 p.m. US EST on Saturday, December 27, 2008. The game, telecast on ESPN, pitted the North Carolina Tar Heels against the West Virginia Mountaineers, with the Mountaineers winning over the Heels 31–30. The crowd of 73,712 was the largest in the bowl's seven-year history and the largest ever to see a college football game in the state of North Carolina. It was also the fourth-largest crowd of the 2008 bowl season, and the second-largest for a non-BCS bowl.

== Scoring summary ==
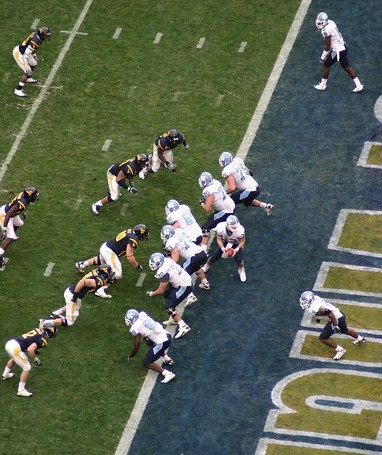
The 2008 Meineke Car Care Bowl between North Carolina and West Virginia

Scoring Play	Score
1st Quarter
WVU - Noel Devine 18-yard TD run (Pat McAfee kick), 8:56	WVU 7–0
UNC - Hakeem Nicks 73-yard TD pass from T. J. Yates (Casey Barth kick), 7:22	Tie 7–7
WVU - Alric Arnett 44-yard TD pass from Pat White (McAfee kick), 5:11	WVU 14–7
UNC - Nicks 66-yard TD pass from Cooter Arnold (Barth kick), 4:57	Tie 14–14
WVU - Bradley Starks 35-yard TD pass from White (McAfee kick), 2:35	WVU 21–14
2nd Quarter
UNC - Safety, Devine tackled in end zone, 13:23	WVU 21–16
UNC - Nicks 25-yard TD pass from Yates (Barth kick), 10:37	UNC 23–21
3rd Quarter
WVU - McAfee 25-yard FG, 9:00	WVU 24–23
UNC - Yates 5-yard TD run (Barth kick), 4:29	UNC 30–24
4th Quarter
WVU - Arnett 20-yard TD pass from White (McAfee kick), 7:14	WVU 31–30
