= Darius Reynaud =

American football player (born 1984)

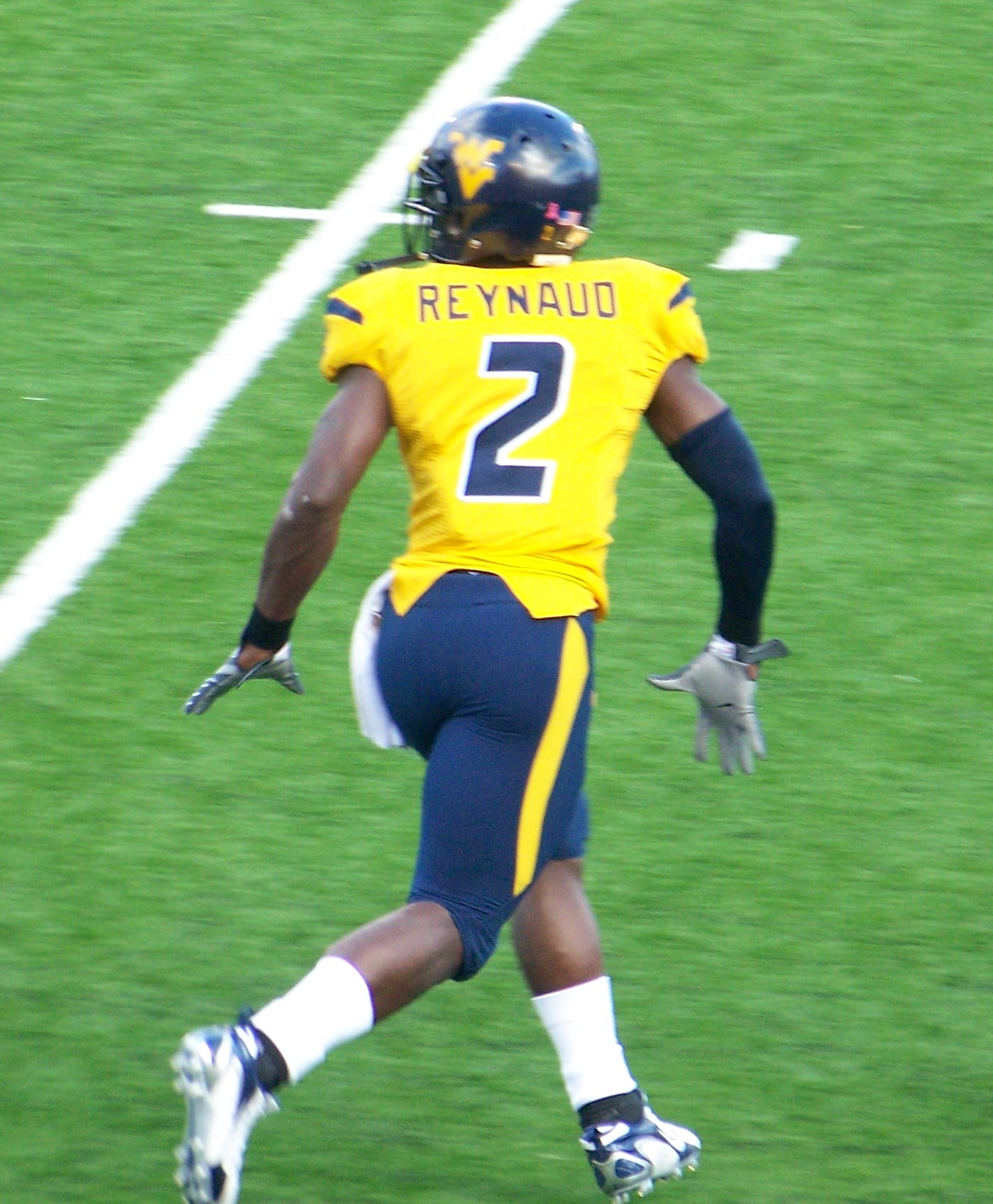
- Reynaud warming up before the 2007 Mississippi State game

No. 82, 15, 25, 24
- Position: Running back

Personal information
- Born: December 29, 1984 (age 41); Luling, Louisiana, U.S.
- Listed height: 5 ft 9 in (1.75 m)
- Listed weight: 208 lb (94 kg)

Career information
- High school: Hahnville (Boutte, Louisiana)
- College: West Virginia
- NFL draft: 2008: undrafted

Career history
- Minnesota Vikings (2008–2009); New York Giants (2010); Tennessee Titans (2012–2013); New York Jets (2013); Chicago Bears (2014)*
- * Offseason or practice squad member only

Awards and highlights
- 2× Second-team All-Big East (2006, 2007); NFL record: Most punt return touchdowns in a game: 2 (tied)

Career NFL statistics
- Receptions: 6
- Receiving yards: 39
- Receiving average: 6.5
- Return yards: 3,332
- Return touchdowns: 3
- Stats at Pro Football Reference

Darius Reynaud (born December 29, 1984) is an American former professional football player who was a running back and return specialist in the National Football League (NFL). He played college football for the West Virginia Mountaineers and was signed by the Minnesota Vikings as an undrafted free agent in 2008.

He was also a member of the New York Giants, Tennessee Titans, New York Jets, and Chicago Bears.

== Early life ==
Reynaud from Luling, Louisiana, was born to Katrina and Michael Reynaud. Reynaud was awarded the St. Charles parish offensive MVP award in high school after leading Hahnville High School to an undefeated record and the state championship as a senior. He recorded 236 carries for 1,889 yards and 37 touchdowns as a Running back his senior season, with nine 100-yard rushing games. His stats earned him First-team All-State, All-District, All-6-5A and All-River Parish honors. He also was the Louisiana state long jump champion with a 24.5' jump.

Although he was an offensive and long jump star in high school, Reynaud only received scholarship offers from Indiana and West Virginia. He eventually signed as one of the last recruits with the Mountaineers.

== College career ==
Reynaud enrolled at West Virginia University in 2004. Reynaud did not participate in any games his true freshman year due to grades, but was not red shirted.

During the 2005 season, Reynaud was accompanied with freshman-stars Pat White and Steve Slaton, and sophomore fullback Owen Schmitt. Reynaud was backup to red shirt-junior receiver Brandon Myles, but still recorded 297 yards on 30 catches. He had a career-first touchdown in the win against Wofford, a 27-yard catch from Adam Bednarik. In the Sugar Bowl win against the Georgia Bulldogs, Reynaud scored in the first quarter with a three-yard reception and a 13-yard reverse-run, and totaled 48 yards receiving.

During the 2006 season, Reynaud's junior season, he started opposite Brandon Myles. Reynaud recorded a career-high 520 yards and a career-low two touchdowns off of 39 receptions. When Slaton was injured against Louisville, Reynaud filled in for him at running back, contributing to Reynaud's 221 yards rushing on 14 carries for the season. He had a career-best 110 yards on five catches with a touchdown against ECU, when the run offense wasn't productive. He was also effective on special teams, when he recorded 813 yards on kick returns and a touchdown. The touchdown came against Maryland, when he bobbled the ball upon catching it. He then picked it up and ran 96 yards for the score, which was the ESPN Play of the Week. He was named to the second-team all-Big East squad at the season's end, along with tackle Ryan Stanchek and punt returner Vaughn Rivers, who were both named to the second-team squad. Reynaud had 1,554 all-purpose yards on the season, which is the sixth most in a season by a Mountaineer in school history.

In the 2007 season, Reynaud was the main receiver for quarterback Pat White. Reynaud earned second-team all-Big East honors after the regular season ended and earned the team's Coaches Contribution Award. In the team's 48–28 victory over Oklahoma in the Fiesta Bowl, he recorded five receptions for 42 yards and two touchdowns and also had a 30-yard run for a touchdown. His touchdowns tied him with Chris Henry for most in a single-season in school history and moved him to third all-time in school history while his 64 receptions on the season was fourth most in school history.

Reynaud finished his career 12th in the all-time school career receiving yardage list, fifth most receptions and third most receiving touchdowns.

== Professional career ==
=== Pre-draft ===
On January 10, 2008, Reynaud announced he would forgo his senior year (regained due to being a prop player) and enter the 2008 NFL draft.

Reynaud was invited to the NFL Scouting Combine. Reynaud's 34.5 vertical jump was the 11th best by a receiver, while his 3-cone drill time of 6.88 was the 9th best, his 20 bench reps were third, and his broad jump was also third best for a receiver.

Reynaud reported that he met with the New England Patriots at the NFL Combine. At West Virginia's Pro Day, Reynaud ran a 4.48 40-yard dash, with a 37" vertical jump. He also improved his broad jump from 10'7" to 10'10". Reynaud also ran a 1.47 10-yard dash time, which was one of the best for any Draft prospect at their respective Pro Days.

Pre-draft measurables
Height	Weight	40-yard dash	10-yard split	20-yard split	20-yard shuttle	Three-cone drill	Vertical jump	Broad jump	Bench press
5 ft 9 in (1.75 m)	201 lb (91 kg)	4.48 s	1.47 s	2.56 s	4.32 s	6.88 s	37 in (0.94 m)	10 ft 10 in (3.30 m)	20 reps
All values from NFL Combine

=== Minnesota Vikings ===
Reynaud went undrafted in the 2008 NFL draft and was signed by the Minnesota Vikings. He was released by the team during final cuts, but re-signed to the team's practice squad. The Vikings then promoted Reynaud to the active roster late in November 2008. Reynaud made his NFL debut during Week 12 against the Jacksonville Jaguars. During the game, he returned two kicks for 36 yards, with a long of 18 yards. He also recorded one tackle. In the Vikings 34–14 victory over the Chicago Bears, he returned two kicks for 62 yards, including a 49-yard return. He also recorded two tackles. Reynaud ended the season with eight kick returns for 201 yards, including a season-long 49-yard return. On September 5, 2009, Reynaud was made part of the 53 man active roster for the Vikings. After the 2009–2010 season, the Vikings converted Reynaud to the Running back position. As a result, Reynaud has changed his jersey number from 82 to 27.

=== New York Giants ===
On September 3, 2010, Reynaud was traded with QB Sage Rosenfels to the New York Giants. On September 3, 2011, Reynaud was cut by the Giants.

=== Tennessee Titans ===
Darius Reynaud was signed on January 7, 2012, to the Tennessee Titans only months after being cut by the Giants. In his first preseason game, Reynaud had a 21-yard run for a touchdown and returned a kick 85-yards for a second touchdown late in the 3rd quarter. Later in week three against the Detroit Lions, Reynaud set a franchise record by returning a 105-yard touchdown on a kickoff in the 4th quarter. During the same game on a punt return, Reynaud threw a lateral pass to cornerback Tommie Campbell which resulted in a touchdown. This play was reminiscent of the infamous "Music City Miracle" and has been dubbed by some fans "Music City Miracle 2". On December 30, 2012, against the Jacksonville Jaguars, Reynaud became the 13th player in NFL history to return two punts for touchdowns. Reynaud holds the dubious distinction of scoring the fastest in an NFL game, albeit for the opposing team. In Week 1 of the 2013 season against the Steelers, Reynaud caught the opening kickoff in the end zone, momentarily entered the field of play, and hesitatingly re-entered the end zone as he thought a touchback would be the best return option. Originally ruled a touch back, head coach Mike Tomlin challenged that, although Reynaud's movements were minimal, the ball clearly exited and re-entered the end zone. The call was overturned and the Steelers were awarded a safety. The official time stamp of the safety is 14:57 in the first quarter, which is the fastest score in NFL history.

On October 21, 2013, after muffing a punt that resulted in a San Francisco 49ers touchdown and negated a potential Titans comeback in the fourth quarter, Reynaud was released from the team.

=== New York Jets ===
Reynaud was signed by the New York Jets on December 3, 2013, after return specialist Josh Cribbs was placed on the injured reserve list.

=== Chicago Bears ===
Reynaud was signed by the Chicago Bears on August 18, 2014. The Bears released Reynaud on August 24, 2014.
