= 2005 LSU Tigers football team =

American college football season

2005 LSU Tigers football

SEC Western Division co-champion Peach Bowl champion

SEC Championship Game, L 14–34 vs. Georgia

Peach Bowl, W 40–3 vs. Miami (FL)
- Conference: Southeastern Conference
- Western Division

Ranking
- Coaches: No. 5
- AP: No. 6
- Record: 11–2 (7–1 SEC)
- Head coach: Les Miles (1st season)
- Offensive coordinator: Jimbo Fisher (6th season)
- Offensive scheme: Pro-style
- Defensive coordinator: Bo Pelini (1st season)
- Base defense: 4–3
- Home stadium: Tiger Stadium

2005 Southeastern Conference football standings
	Conf.			Overall
Team	W		L	W		L
Eastern Division
No. 10 Georgia x$	6	–	2	10	–	3
South Carolina	5	–	3	7	–	5
No. 12 Florida	5	–	3	9	–	3
Vanderbilt	3	–	5	5	–	6
Tennessee	3	–	5	5	–	6
Kentucky	2	–	6	3	–	8
Western Division
No. 5 LSU xy	7	–	1	11	–	2
No. 14 Auburn x	7	–	1	9	–	3
No. 8 Alabama	6	–	2	10	–	2
Arkansas	2	–	6	4	–	7
Mississippi State	1	–	7	3	–	8
Ole Miss	1	–	7	3	–	8
Championship: Georgia 34, LSU 14
$ – BCS representative as conference champion; x – Division champion/co-champions; y – Championship game participant; Alabama had all victories vacated by the NCAA in 2010. As such, the official record for Alabama is 0–2 (0–2).; Rankings from AP Poll

The 2005 LSU Tigers football team represented Louisiana State University in the 2005 NCAA Division I-A football season. Coached by Les Miles in his first season at LSU, the Tigers played their home games at Tiger Stadium in Baton Rouge, Louisiana. Despite all of the distractions from Hurricane Katrina, LSU finished its season with an 11–2 record capped off by a 40–3 victory over No. 9 Miami in the 2005 Peach Bowl without starting quarterback JaMarcus Russell.

== Schedule ==
Date	Time	Opponent	Rank	Site	TV	Result	Attendance
September 10	8:15 p.m.	at No. 15 Arizona State*	No. 5	Sun Devil Stadium; Tempe, AZ	ESPN	W 35–31	63,210
September 26	6:30 p.m.	No. 10 Tennessee	No. 4	Tiger Stadium; Baton Rouge, LA	ESPN2	L 27–30 ^{OT}	91,986
October 1	1:30 p.m.	at Mississippi State	No. 4	Davis Wade Stadium; Starkville, MS (rivalry)	PPV	W 37–7	48,344
October 8	6:00 p.m.	at Vanderbilt	No. 11	Vanderbilt Stadium; Nashville, TN	ESPN2	W 34–6	37,309
October 15	2:30 p.m.	No. 11 Florida	No. 10	Tiger Stadium; Baton Rouge, LA (rivalry)	CBS	W 21–17	92,402
October 22	6:45 p.m.	No. 16 Auburn	No. 7	Tiger Stadium; Baton Rouge, LA (Tiger Bowl)	ESPN	W 20–17 ^{OT}	92,664
October 29	7:00 p.m.	North Texas*	No. 7	Tiger Stadium; Baton Rouge, LA	PPV	W 56–3	92,143
November 5	7:00 p.m.	No. 7 (I-AA) Appalachian State*^{†}	No. 6	Tiger Stadium; Baton Rouge, LA		W 24–0	91,414
November 12	2:30 p.m.	at No. 4 Alabama	No. 5	Bryant–Denny Stadium; Tuscaloosa, AL (rivalry) (College GameDay)	CBS	W 16–13 ^{OT}	81,018
November 19	6:45 p.m.	at Ole Miss	No. 4	Vaught–Hemingway Stadium; Oxford, MS (Magnolia Bowl)	ESPN2	W 40–7	59,543
November 25	1:30 p.m.	Arkansas	No. 3	Tiger Stadium; Baton Rouge, LA (Battle for the Golden Boot)	CBS	W 19–17	91,606
December 3	5:00 p.m.	vs. No. 13 Georgia	No. 3	Georgia Dome; Atlanta, GA (SEC Championship Game)	CBS	L 14–34	73,717
December 30	6:30 p.m.	vs. No. 9 Miami (FL)*	No. 10	Georgia Dome; Atlanta, GA (Peach Bowl)	ESPN	W 40–3	65,620
*Non-conference game; ^{†}Homecoming; Rankings from AP Poll released prior to the game; All times are in Central time

== Rankings ==
Ranking movements Legend: ██ Increase in ranking ██ Decrease in ranking
	Week															
Poll	Pre	1	2	3	4	5	6	7	8	9	10	11	12	13	14	Final
AP	5	5	3	3	4	11	10	7	7	6	5	4	3	3	10	6
Coaches	6	5	3	3	4	11	8	7	7	6	5	4	3	3	10	5
Harris	Not released				5	12	10	7	8	7	5	4	3	4	10	Not released
BCS	Not released							6	8	8	7	5	4	4	12	Not released

== Game summaries ==
=== Florida ===
#11 Florida at #10 LSU

Team	1	2	3	4	Total
Florida	0	7	10	0	17
• LSU	14	0	0	7	21

- Date: Saturday, October 15
- Location: Tiger Stadium, Baton Rouge, Louisiana
- Game start: 3:30 p.m. EST
- Game weather: Sunny
- TV announcers (CBS): Verne Lundquist & Todd Blackledge
- Source: ESPN

Scoring summary
1	11:42	LSU	Bennie Brazell 43-yard pass from JaMarcus Russell (Colt David kick)	LSU 7-0
1	1:10	LSU	Dwayne Bowe 27-yard pass from JaMarcus Russell (Colt David kick)	LSU 14-0
2	8:44	FLA	Kestahn Moore 32-yard run (Chris Hetland kick)	LSU 14-7
3	11:31	FLA	Chris Hetland 22-yard field goal	LSU 14-10
3	4:02	FLA	DeShawn Wynn 1-yard run (Chris Hetland kick)	FLA 17-14
4	12:35	LSU	Joseph Addai 3-yard run (Colt David kick)	LSU 21-17

== Roster ==
2005 LSU Tigers football team roster
Players
Coaches
Offense

Pos.	#	Name	Class
RB	10	Joseph Addai	Sr
WR	80	Dwayne Bowe	Jr
RB	22	Alley Broussard	Jr
QB	15	Matt Flynn	So
WR	5	Skyler Green	Sr
QB	4	JaMarcus Russell	Jr
OT	76	Andrew Whitworth	Sr

Defense

Pos.	#	Name	Class

Special teams

Pos.	#	Name	Class

Head coach

- Les Miles

Coordinators/assistant coaches

- Jimbo Fisher - Offensive Coordinator & Quarterbacks
- Bo Pelini - Defensive Coordinator
- Bradley Dale Peveto - Special Teams & Linebackers
- Todd Monken - Passing Game Coordinator & Wide Receivers
- Doug Mallory - Defensive backs
- Josh Henson - Tight Ends coach
- Mike Ekeler - Graduate Assistant
- Tracy Smith – Offensive graduate assistant
- Jason Woodman - Graduate Assistant

Legend

- (C) Team captain
- (S) Suspended
- (I) Ineligible
- Injured
- Redshirt

Roster

== LSU Tigers in the 2006 NFL draft ==
Player	Position	Round	Pick	Overall	NFL team
Joseph Addai	Running back	1	30	30	Indianapolis Colts
Andrew Whitworth	Offensive tackle	2	23	55	Cincinnati Bengals
Claude Wroten	Defensive tackle	3	4	68	St. Louis Rams
Skyler Green	Wide receiver	4	28	125	Dallas Cowboys
Kyle Williams	Defensive tackle	5	1	134	Buffalo Bills
Melvin Oliver	Defensive end	6	28	197	San Francisco 49ers
Bennie Brazell	Wide receiver	7	23	231	Cincinnati Bengals

== LSU Tigers in the 2006 CFL draft ==
Player	Position	Round	Pick	Overall	CFL team
Peter Dyakowski	Offensive Tackle	2	3	11	Hamilton Tiger-Cats
