= 2005 Georgia Bulldogs football team =

American college football season

2005 Georgia Bulldogs football

SEC champion SEC Eastern Division champion

SEC Championship Game, W 34–14 vs. LSU

Sugar Bowl, L 35–38 vs. West Virginia
- Conference: Southeastern Conference
- Eastern Division

Ranking
- Coaches: No. 10
- AP: No. 10
- Record: 10–3 (6–2 SEC)
- Head coach: Mark Richt (5th season)
- Offensive coordinator: Neil Callaway (5th season)
- Offensive scheme: Pro-style
- Defensive coordinator: Willie Martinez (1st season)
- Base defense: 4–3
- Home stadium: Sanford Stadium

2005 Southeastern Conference football standings
	Conf.			Overall
Team	W		L	W		L
Eastern Division
No. 10 Georgia x$	6	–	2	10	–	3
South Carolina	5	–	3	7	–	5
No. 12 Florida	5	–	3	9	–	3
Vanderbilt	3	–	5	5	–	6
Tennessee	3	–	5	5	–	6
Kentucky	2	–	6	3	–	8
Western Division
No. 5 LSU xy	7	–	1	11	–	2
No. 14 Auburn x	7	–	1	9	–	3
No. 8 Alabama	6	–	2	10	–	2
Arkansas	2	–	6	4	–	7
Mississippi State	1	–	7	3	–	8
Ole Miss	1	–	7	3	–	8
Championship: Georgia 34, LSU 14
$ – BCS representative as conference champion; x – Division champion/co-champions; y – Championship game participant; Alabama had all victories vacated by the NCAA in 2010. As such, the official record for Alabama is 0–2 (0–2).; Rankings from AP Poll

The 2005 Georgia Bulldogs football team represented the University of Georgia as a member of the Southeastern Conference (SEC) during the 2005 NCAA Division I-A football season. Led by fifth-year head coach Mark Richt, the Bulldogs compiled an overall record of 10–3 with a mark of 6–2 in conference play, winning the SEC's Eastern Division. Georgia advanced to the SEC Championship Game, where the Bulldogs defeated LSU. The Bulldogs finished the season with a loss in the Sugar Bowl to West Virginia. The team played home games at Sanford Stadium in Athens, Georgia.

== Schedule ==
The South Carolina–Georgia game on September 10, 2005

Date	Time	Opponent	Rank	Site	TV	Result	Attendance
September 3	5:30 p.m.	No. 18 Boise State*	No. 13	Sanford Stadium; Athens, GA	ESPN	W 48–13	92,746
September 10	5:30 p.m.	South Carolina	No. 9	Sanford Stadium; Athens, GA (rivalry)	ESPN	W 17–15	92,746
September 17	1:00 p.m.	Louisiana–Monroe*	No. 7	Sanford Stadium; Athens, GA	CSS	W 44–7	92,746
September 24	7:45 p.m.	at Mississippi State	No. 7	Davis Wade Stadium; Starkville, MS	ESPN	W 23–10	49,903
October 8	3:30 p.m.	at No. 8 Tennessee	No. 5	Neyland Stadium; Knoxville, TN (rivalry)	CBS	W 27–14	108,470
October 15	7:15 p.m.	at Vanderbilt	No. 5	Vanderbilt Stadium; Nashville, TN (rivalry)	ESPN2	W 34–17	38,822
October 22	12:30 p.m.	Arkansas^{†}	No. 4	Sanford Stadium; Athens, GA	JPS	W 23–20	92,746
October 29	3:30 p.m.	vs. No. 16 Florida	No. 4	Alltel Stadium; Jacksonville, FL (rivalry, College GameDay)	CBS	L 10–14	84,501
November 12	7:45 p.m.	No. 15 Auburn	No. 9	Sanford Stadium; Athens, GA (Deep South's Oldest Rivalry)	ESPN	L 30–31	92,746
November 19	12:30 p.m.	Kentucky	No. 14	Sanford Stadium; Athens, GA	JPS	W 45–13	92,746
November 26	8:00 p.m.	at No. 20 Georgia Tech*	No. 13	Bobby Dodd Stadium; Atlanta, GA (Clean, Old-Fashioned Hate)	ABC	W 14–7	56,412
December 3	6:00 p.m.	vs. No. 3 LSU	No. 13	Georgia Dome; Atlanta, GA (SEC Championship Game)	CBS	W 34–14	73,717
January 2, 2006	8:30 p.m.	vs. No. 11 West Virginia*	No. 8	Georgia Dome; Atlanta, GA (Sugar Bowl)	ABC	L 35–38	74,459
*Non-conference game; ^{†}Homecoming; Rankings from AP Poll released prior to the game; All times are in Eastern time

== Rankings ==
Ranking movements Legend: ██ Increase in ranking ██ Decrease in ranking
	Week															
Poll	Pre	1	2	3	4	5	6	7	8	9	10	11	12	13	14	Final
AP	13	9	7	7	7	5	5	4	4	11	9	14	13	13	8	10
Coaches	13	9	6	6	6	4	4	4	4	10	9	14	13	13	8	10
Harris	Not released				7	5	4	4	4	11	9	13	12	12	8	Not released
BCS	Not released							4	4	11	9	16	15	13	7	Not released

== Preseason ==
Coming off a strong 2004 season in which the Bulldogs were ranked No. 6 in the final Coaches Poll, Georgia was ranked No. 13 in the preseason Coaches Poll. D.J. Shockley was selected as the overall team captain and represented the offense. Max Jean-Gilles was the other offensive captain, Kedric Golston and Greg Blue were the defensive captains and Mike Gilliam was captain of the special teams.

== Roster ==
Pos	Name	Class	Number
QB	D. J. Shockley	Sr.(RS)	3
QB	Joe Tereshinski	Jr.(RS)	13
QB	Joe Cox	Fr.	14
QB	Blake Barnes	Fr.(RS)	15
RB	Thomas Brown	So.	20
RB	Chris Burgett	Sr.(RS)	24
RB	Danny Ware	So.(RS)	28
RB	Kregg Lumpkin	So.(RS)	6
RB	Tyson Browning	Sr.(RS)	31
FB	Brannan Southerland	Fr.(RS)	36
FB	Tony Milton	Sr.(RS)	9
FB	Des Williams	So.(RS)	35
WR	Bryan McClendon	Sr.	16
WR	Mohamed Massaquoi	Fr.	1
WR	AJ Bryant	So.	18
WR	Kenneth Harris	Fr.	80
WR	Mario Raley	Jr.(RS)	80
WR	Mikey Henderson	So.(RS)	27
TE	Leonard Pope	Jr.	81
TE	Martrez Milner	Jr.(RS)	87
TE	Tripp Chandler	Fr.	86
DE	Quentin Moses	Jr.	94
DE	Charles Johnson	So.	99
DE	Marcus Howard	So.(RS)	38
DE	Roderick Battle	Fr.	41
DL	Kedric Goulston	Sr.	97
DL	Jeff Owens	Fr.	95
LB	Tony Taylor	Jr.(RS)	43
LB	Danny Verdun-Wheeler	Jr.(RS)	42
LB	Jarvis Jackson	Jr.	45
LB	Dannell Ellerbe	Fr.(RS)	33
LB	Brandon Miller	So.	12
CB	Demario Minter	Sr.	2
CB	Paul Oliver	So.(RS)	8
CB	Thomas Flowers	So.(RS)	29
CB	Bryan Evans	Fr.	3
S	Greg Blue	Sr.(RS)	17
S	Tra Battle	Jr.(RS)	25
K	Brandon Coutu	So.(RS)	96
P	Gordon Ely-Kelso	Jr.(RS)	95

== Statistics ==
=== Team ===
Statistic	UGA	Opponent
Scoring	384	213
Points per game	29.5	16.4
First downs	258	229
Rushing	106	114
Passing	132	101
Penalty	20	14
Total offense	5,085	4,075
Avg per play	6.2	4.8
Avg per game	391.2	313.5
Fumbles–lost	21–11	27–13
Penalties–yards	77–697	104–756
Avg per game	53.6	58.2

Statistic	UGA	Opponent
Punts-Yards	57-2,443	80-3,140
Avg per punt	37.9	41.0
Time of possession per game	28:36	31:24
3rd down conversions	60 / 163 (37%)	70 / 188 (37%)
4th down conversions	7 / 12 (58%)	9 / 16 (56%)
Touchdowns scored	45	27
Field goals–attempts–long	23–30–58	9–12–45
PAT–attempts	45–45 (100%)	24–25 (96%)
Attendance	556,206	253,607
Games / avg per game	6 / 92,701	4 / 63,402

=== Scores by quarter ===
	1	2	3	4	Total
Opponents	55	47	44	67	213
Georgia	80	115	101	88	384
