= Owen Schmitt =

American football player (born 1985)

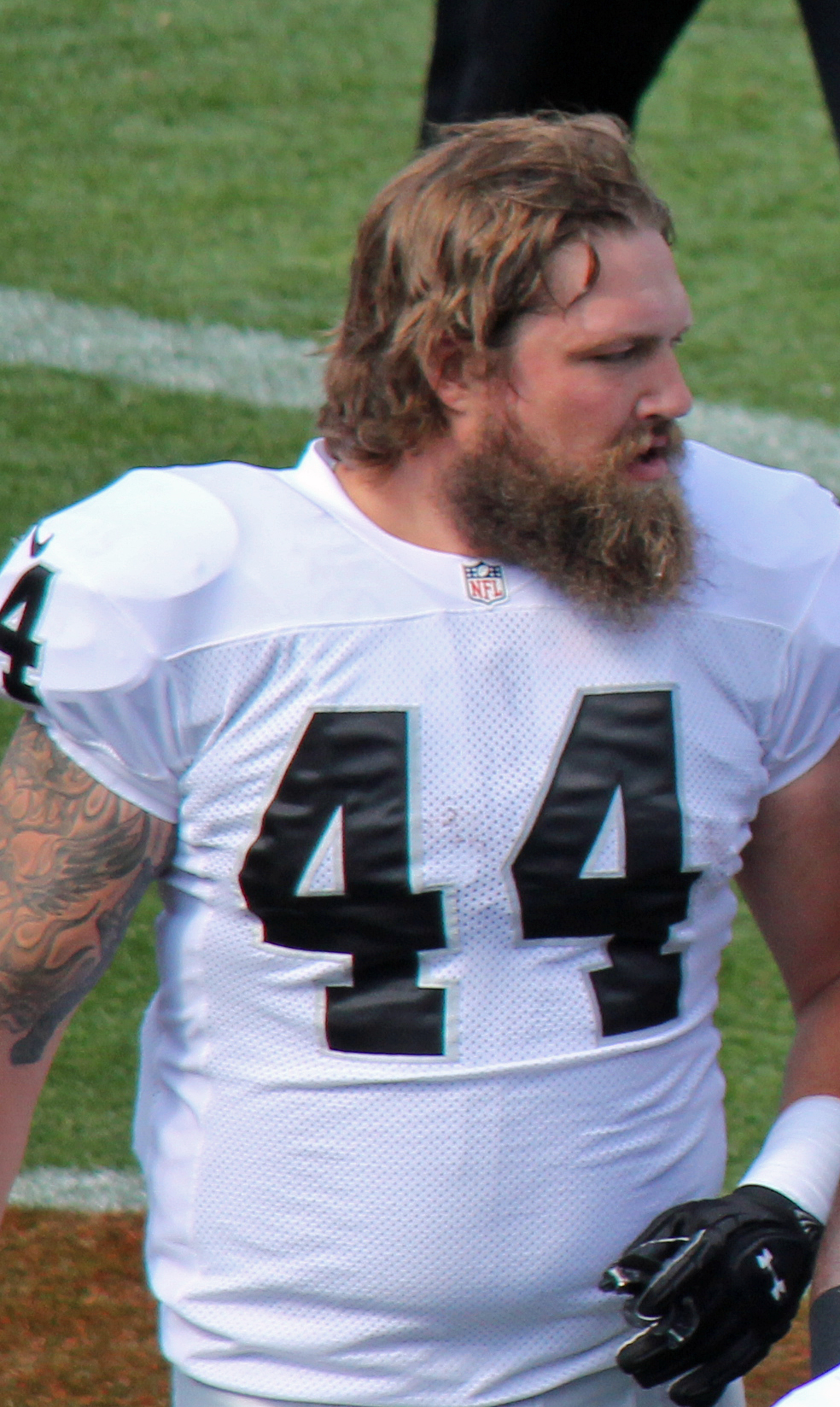
- Schmitt with the Oakland Raiders in 2012

No. 35, 32, 44
- Position: Fullback

Personal information
- Born: February 13, 1985 (age 41); Gilman, Wisconsin, U.S.
- Listed height: 6 ft 2 in (1.88 m)
- Listed weight: 251 lb (114 kg)

Career information
- High school: Fairfax (Fairfax, Virginia)
- College: West Virginia
- NFL draft: 2008: 5th round, 163rd overall pick

Career history
- Seattle Seahawks (2008–2009); Philadelphia Eagles (2010–2011); Oakland Raiders (2012)

Awards and highlights
- Division III All-Conference (2004); Ira Errett Rodgers Award (2007); Captain Award (2007)

Career NFL statistics
- Rushing attempts: 11
- Rushing yards: 28
- Receptions: 34
- Receiving yards: 218
- Total touchdowns: 2
- Stats at Pro Football Reference

Owen Schmitt (born February 13, 1985) is an American former professional football player who was a fullback in the National Football League (NFL). He was selected by the Seattle Seahawks in the fifth round of the 2008 NFL draft. He played college football for the West Virginia Mountaineers. Before transferring to the Mountaineers he played for the Wisconsin–River Falls Falcons.

Schmitt also played for the Philadelphia Eagles and the Oakland Raiders.

== Early life ==
Schmitt was born with a cleft lip and palate and underwent several surgeries to correct it as a child, including one when he was in fourth grade in which doctors inserted a piece of hip bone into his jaw. As a result, he has a scar running from under his nose to his upper lip.

Schmitt played fullback, defensive end, and linebacker first at Paul VI Catholic High School and then Fairfax High School in Virginia.

== College career ==
=== Wisconsin–River Falls ===
After graduation from high school, he enrolled at Wisconsin–River Falls. At River Falls, he posted a 1,063 yards and five touchdown performance his freshman year, which earned him WIAC all-conference honors in only nine starting games.

=== West Virginia ===
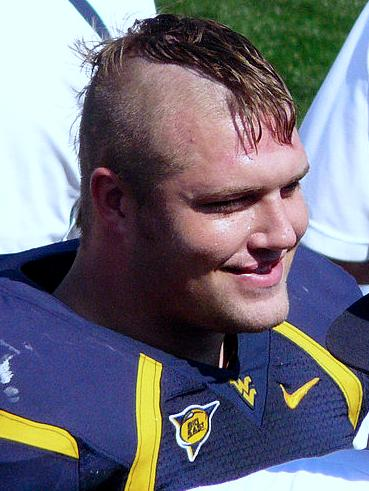
Schmitt at West Virginia

Schmitt attended spring practice the next year at West Virginia University. A walk-on to the Mountaineers' squad, Schmitt became the starter that fall as a sophomore for the 2005 season and it was a breakout year. He was active as both a rusher and as a primary blocker. At the midpoint of the season, freshman Steve Slaton earned the starting spot at halfback, and with quarterback Pat White at the helm, Schmitt and Slaton teamed up to make one of the best rushing tandems in the NCAA. Schmitt totaled 380 yards and two touchdowns himself, while Slaton was a huge beneficiary of his blocking, recording 1,128 yards and seventeen touchdowns.

In 2006, Slaton, White, and Schmitt were featured on the cover of Sports Illustrated's regional "Big Man On Campus" article. With high expectations, the Mountaineers finished with an 11-2 record. Schmitt rushed for 351 yards and seven touchdowns on the season, and also caught one touchdown pass. His blocking helped Slaton to another phenomenal year—1,744 yards. Schmitt's biggest game was the come-from-behind Gator Bowl win against Georgia Tech, where he filled in for the injured Slaton and rushed for 109 yards and two touchdowns.

Schmitt earned National Strength and Conditioning Association Strength All-American honors at the end of the season, as he bulked up from 245 pounds to 260. After the season, he was named "College football's top workout freak" by ESPN.com.

In 2007, his senior year, Schmitt was arguably one of the best fullbacks in the nation. He also took many snaps at tight end in spring practice, where head coach Rich Rodriguez lined him up occasionally. Schmitt's first big game of the season came against Maryland when he carried the ball four times for 46 yards, including a 44-yard run early in the 31-14 win. According to ESPN during the game, Schmitt had broken eight face masks in his career to that point. In the next game against East Carolina, Schmitt rushed for 32 yards on four carries with two receptions for nine yards. Against Syracuse at the Carrier Dome, he earned MVP honors with two touchdowns on eight carries for 39 yards; in that game he also had a 31-yard reception (where he hurdled one defender and ran over another) and a 27-yard punt that was downed inside the Syracuse 10-yard line on a trick play. In a subsequent game, a 28-23 victory over #22 Cincinnati, he rushed for 19 yards on six carries, including the first score of the game, a four-yard touchdown run. After wins over Louisville and Cincinnati, he had reportedly recorded 10 broken facemasks. WVU's impressive run to the national title game was sidetracked on the last game of the season with a loss in the Backyard Brawl to Pitt. This knocked them out of the National Championship game and matched them up instead with #4 Oklahoma in the Fiesta Bowl.

Schmitt's 57-yard touchdown run in the 48-28 Fiesta Bowl victory over Oklahoma came in an emotional game, his dash through the line of scrimmage and down the sideline broke open what had been a tight 6-3 scoreline. That run was also a personal career-best as well as a WVU school bowl record (until Noel Devine broke the record in the fourth quarter of that same game). It also marked the third consecutive bowl in which Schmitt had a 50+ yard run. Schmitt finished the Fiesta Bowl with three rushes for 64 yards and a touchdown.

Schmitt was awarded the Ira Errett Rodgers Award and Fred Schaus Captain's Award at the end of the regular season by head coach Rich Rodriguez.

As a rush blocker, Schmitt finished the 2007 season with 106 knockdown blocks and 17 touchdown-resulting blocks. He also finished the season with two of his three "pooch" punts downed inside the 20-yard line, for an average of 20.3 yards-per-punt.

In Schmitt's career, he earned 21 career starts, four of which were at tight end. Through his 353 career carries (at WVU and Wisconsin–River Falls), he was only tackled for a loss four times. He carried the ball for 1,003 yards, a 6.3 yard average, during his Mountaineer career. In his four collegiate seasons, Schmitt totaled 122 points and 2,398 all-purpose yards.

== Professional career ==
=== Pre-draft ===
Schmitt accepted an invitation to play in the 2008 Senior Bowl in Mobile, Alabama following the season. He was then invited to the 2008 NFL Scouting Combine. Schmitt's 26 bench reps were tied for the fourth best by a back in the Combine.

At West Virginia's Pro Day on March 13, Schmitt ran a 4.72 40, a 4.11 short shuttle, a 6.85 three-cone, and an 11.85 long shuttle. He measured in at 6'2" and 249 lb (113 kg). He performed running back, fullback, and tight end drills without dropping a pass the entire day. He also recorded a 9'9" broad jump and a 31.5" vertical jump. After the Pro Day, Schmitt worked out at the campus before traveling to interview with the Cleveland Browns, Washington Redskins, and San Diego Chargers. He also worked out with the Browns' running backs coach, Anthony Lynn.

Pre-draft measurables
Height	Weight	Arm length	Hand span	40-yard dash	10-yard split	20-yard split	20-yard shuttle	Three-cone drill	Vertical jump	Broad jump	Bench press	Wonderlic
6 ft 2 in (1.88 m)	247 lb (112 kg)	32 in (0.81 m)	9 3/8 in (0.24 m)	4.72 s	1.66 s	2.69 s	4.18 s	6.96 s	31.5 in (0.80 m)	9 ft 9 in (2.97 m)	26 reps	24
All values from NFL Combine/West Virginia's Pro Day

=== Seattle Seahawks ===
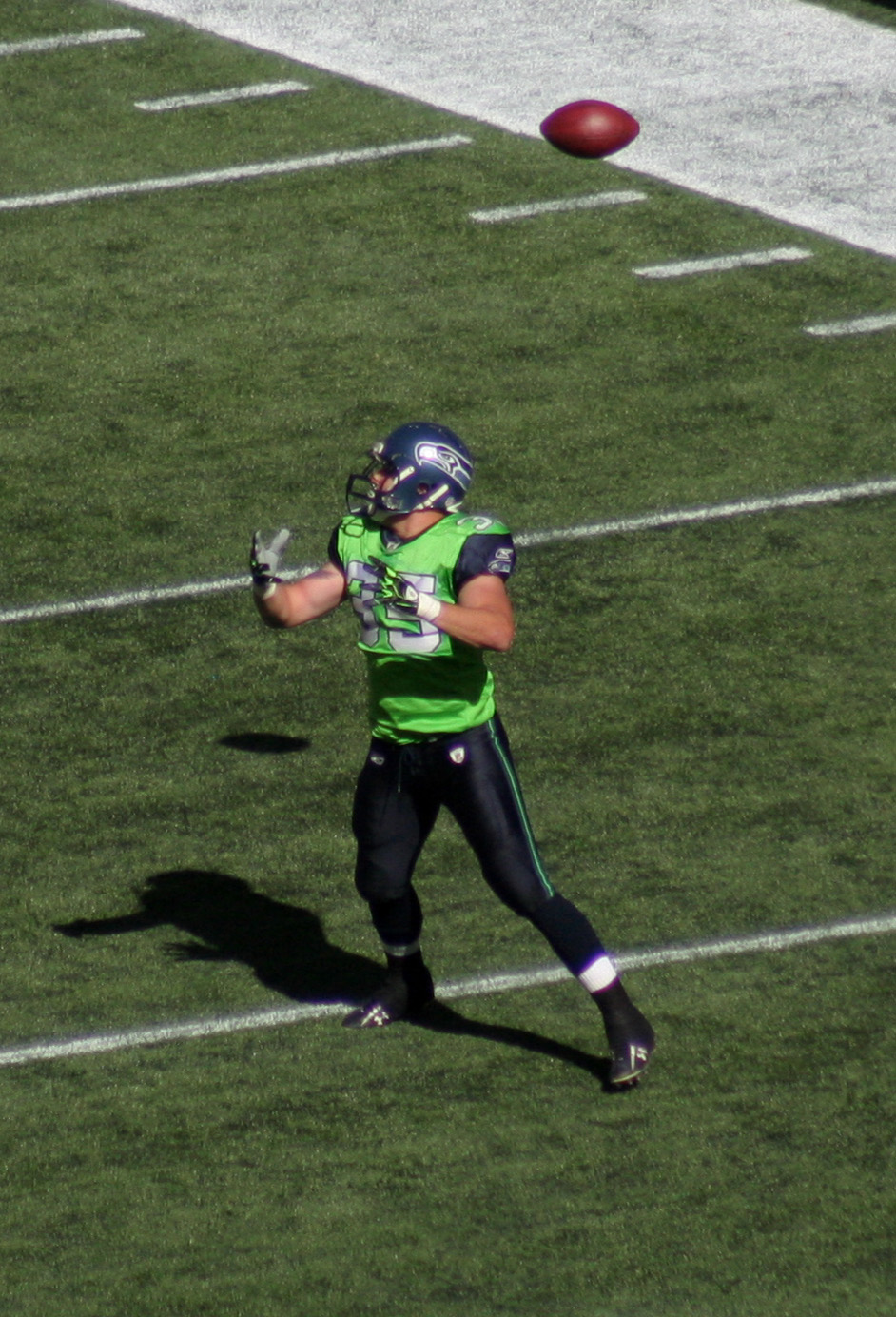
Schmitt with the Seattle Seahawks in September 2009

Schmitt was selected in the fifth round (163rd overall) in the 2008 NFL draft by the Seattle Seahawks. He was the second Mountaineer selected in the draft, behind Steve Slaton in the third round (89th overall) to the Houston Texans. Schmitt signed a four-year $1.87 million contract that included a $158,000 signing bonus. In his first preseason game as a Seahawk, he rushed one time for two yards, caught two passes for 35 yards and also had two tackles on special teams against the Minnesota Vikings. The following week, against the Chicago Bears, he recorded one reception for 15 yards.

Schmitt did not play in the season opener against the Buffalo Bills, but he recorded one reception for six yards in the second game against the San Francisco 49ers. In the 27-3 victory over the St. Louis Rams, he recorded his first professional carry, for two yards. He earned his first career start against the Philadelphia Eagles later in the season, in which he had a block in the backfield on a 90-yard touchdown pass early in the game, a franchise record for longest pass play in team history. He finished the game with two receptions for eight yards. In the following game, he carried the ball three times for 19 yards, including a 14-yard run, and recorded one reception for six yards against the Miami Dolphins. In the next loss to the Arizona Cardinals, he recorded a seven-yard reception. Schmitt finished his rookie season by totaling five carries for 21 yards and six receptions for 29 yards, playing in every game on the season except for the season-opening loss against Buffalo.

Following the March 2009 free agency departure of starting fullback Leonard Weaver to the Philadelphia Eagles, Schmitt was expected to compete with Justin Griffith for the starting Fullback role for the 2009 season.

Schmitt attracted media and YouTube attention in the aftermath of a game against the Jacksonville Jaguars during the 2009 NFL season during which he smashed his helmet against his head until he opened up a large gash.

On September 6, 2010, the Seahawks released Schmitt, citing the lack of need for a true fullback in the Seattle offense.

=== Philadelphia Eagles ===
Schmitt was signed by the Philadelphia Eagles on September 13, 2010 following a season-ending injury to Leonard Weaver. On December 2 against the Houston Texans in week 13, Schmitt caught a five-yard touchdown pass from quarterback Michael Vick, marking Schmitt's first career touchdown with the Eagles.

=== Oakland Raiders ===
On May 15, 2012, he signed with the Oakland Raiders.

On December 10, 2012, the Raiders released Schmitt and promoted cornerback Chimdi Chekwa from the practice squad. Schmitt played in 13 games, with four starts when Marcel Reece shifted to tailback following injuries to Darren McFadden and Mike Goodson.

== Personal life ==
Growing up, John Riggins of the Washington Redskins was Schmitt's favorite football player.

Schmitt likes to play guitar in his spare time and can often be found following the Davisson Brothers Band on tour. The band based out of Clarksburg, West Virginia allows him to play on stage as a part of the band whenever he is able.

In 2013, Schmitt partnered with the Davisson Brothers Band and opened "Schmitt's Saloon and Davisson Brothers Band Music Hall" in Morgantown, West Virginia to be the band's music hub at home. Later that year the music video for the un-released single "Country Just Like Me", by the Davisson Brothers Band, was shot by Nashville director Steve Condon, which included cameos by Owen Schmitt, famed bluegrass musician Del McCoury and other Nashville musicians and friends. Schmitt continued to run the establishment, which hosted other national country acts, until he closed it in June 2018, telling Morgantown's newspaper, The Dominion Post, "It was a great place, but I’m just worn out. I was cooking, cleaning and bartending and I didn’t get to run my business because it was running me all the time." The establishment's landlord also indicated that business declined after a major fight in the parking lot resulted in at least one serious injury. The former Schmitt's Saloon was also a barbecue restaurant, with Schmitt serving as the main barbecue chef; he had expanded that portion of the Saloon into a catering business. When he closed the Saloon, he planned to make the catering business a full-time profession.

In 2015, Owen also appeared in a new music video for the nationally released single "Jesse James", by the Davisson Brothers Band. The video was directed by Steve Condon and premiered on Sirius XM's the Highway. The video was later released and aired on CMT, Great American Country and Vevo. The video also included cameos from the iconic American Wall of Death riders.

In 2021, Owen took position as assistant coach at Greenbrier West High School in Charmco, West Virginia.

=== Media ===
Schmitt is featured on the cover of the PSP version of NCAA Football 09. He also shared a Sports Illustrated regional cover for the 2006 college football preview with teammates Steve Slaton and Pat White.
