= D. J. Shockley =

American football player (born 1983)

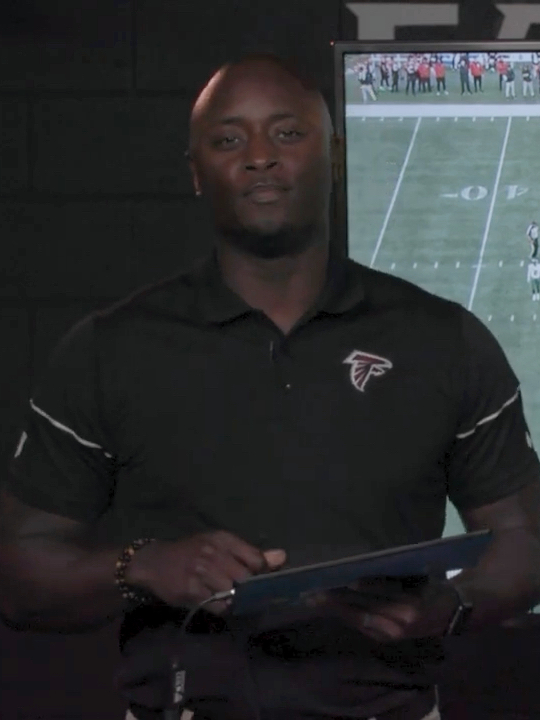
- Shockley in 2021

No. 3
- Position: Quarterback

Personal information
- Born: March 23, 1983 (age 43); College Park, Georgia, U.S.
- Listed height: 6 ft 1 in (1.85 m)
- Listed weight: 222 lb (101 kg)

Career information
- High school: North Clayton (College Park)
- College: Georgia (2001–2005)
- NFL draft: 2006: 7th round, 223rd overall pick

Career history
- Atlanta Falcons (2006–2009); Omaha Nighthawks (2010); Sacramento Mountain Lions (2011)*; Omaha Nighthawks (2011)
- * Offseason or practice squad member only

Awards and highlights
- First-team All-SEC (2005)

Donald Eugene "D. J." Shockley (born March 23, 1983) is an American sports anchor and former professional football player. He was selected by the Atlanta Falcons in the seventh round of the 2006 NFL draft and served as a backup quarterback for four and a half years, but never played in a regular season or postseason game. He played college football for the Georgia Bulldogs.

After his playing career, Shockley worked as a color commentator and studio analyst for college football broadcasts on the ESPN network. He became a sports anchor for WAGA-TV (Fox 5 Atlanta) in 2021.

== Early life ==
D.J. Shockley played football, basketball and ran track at North Clayton High School. His father, Donald Shockley Sr, was his team's head coach. As a senior, he threw for 1,861 yards and 11 touchdowns, as well as rushing for 864 yards and eight more touchdowns. Shockley became the starting quarterback by his sophomore season at North Clayton High School. He threw 28 touchdowns and for more than 3,200 yards his final two seasons while rushing for nearly 1,600 yards. The native of College Park, Georgia was a highly recruited QB earning various national accolades: 2000 USA Today All-USA Second-team, Max Emfinger's Top 125 players (#1 Athletic quarterback), 2000 Parade Magazine All-America Team, SUPERPREP Elite 50 (SuperPrep's No. 1 ranked QB), The Atlanta Journal-Constitution Super Southern 100, Top 50 in Georgia, Marvelous Metro Eleven, Class AAAA All-State Quarterback, and 2000 Georgia Sports Writers Association Class AAAA All-State Quarterback. In track and field, Shockley ran the 100 meters in 11.39 seconds, and cleared 6.73 meters in long jump.

== College career ==
UGA's new incoming head coach in 2001, Mark Richt, made Shockley a priority recruit, and he is generally regarded as Richt's first official recruit at Georgia.

Richt ultimately chose redshirt freshman David Greene to be the starting quarterback for the Bulldogs in 2001, while Shockley was redshirted. Greene went on to set the NCAA record for wins as a starting quarterback in a career, but over the course of those four years, Shockley did see some playing time in a modified dual-quarterback system.

In 2002 as a redshirt freshman, playing in parts of 10 games, Shockley completed 32-of-52 passes (61.5%) for 415 yards with five touchdowns and a pass efficiency rating of 152.62. He rushed for 111 yards and two more touchdowns. He also threw a 37-yard TD pass in the Nokia Sugar Bowl win over Florida State University as the Bulldogs wrapped up their first SEC Championship season in 20 years.

One of Shockley's finest moments as a redshirt freshman came on October 26 of that year as he and Greene combined to throw for a school-record six touchdown passes in Georgia's comeback win over Kentucky, 52–24. The Wildcats, playing in their own stadium, had led 24–21 at the half. Shockley went 10-of-14 passing for 102 yards and two touchdowns as coach Richt rotated him into the game every third series during the contest.

In 2003, Shockley injured his knee midway through the season and finished with 9-of-21 pass attempts for 88 yards and one touchdown. He added another 101 yards on the ground and a rushing touchdown in six games.

In 2004, Shockley completed 26-of-60 (43.3%) passes for 464 yards with four touchdowns and one interception. He had 24 rushes for 113 yards in 10 games. Shockley earned an SEC Academic Honor Roll award in 2004 as a Speech Communications major. He is a member of the Phi Beta Sigma fraternity.

Following the Bulldogs' opening win against Boise State, Shockley was named Cingular All-America Player of the Week for his 374-yard, six touchdown effort (289 yards, 5 TDs passing; 85 yards, 1 TD rushing) against the Broncos. He was also named Sporting News Player of the Week and SEC Player of the Week, and nominated for USATODAY.com Player of the Week after the Boise State game. He was one of 11 Division I-A football players named to AFCA's National Good Works Team, which recognizes "players who have devoted themselves to exemplary community service". He was also chosen as a semi-finalist for the 2005 Draddy Trophy.

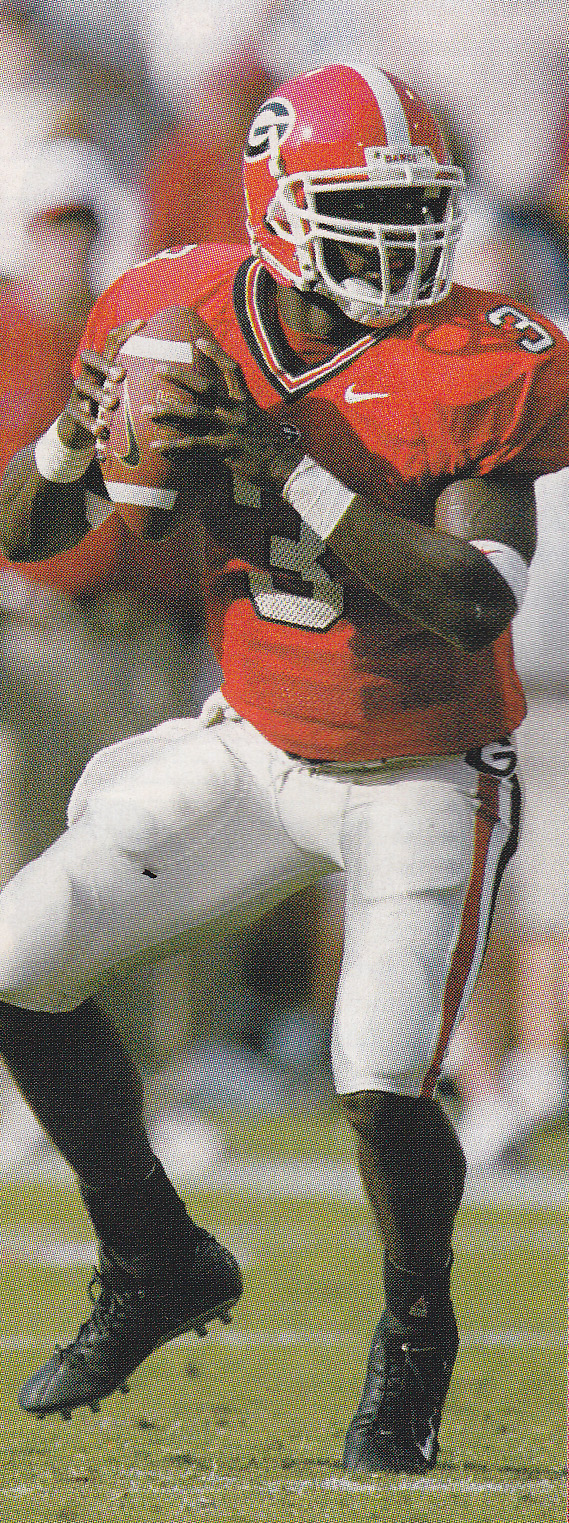
Shockley with Georgia in 2005

In 2005, Shockley played in 12 of Georgia's 13 games, completing 173-of-310 (55.8%) passes for 2,588 yards and 24 touchdowns with five interceptions. He also gained 322 yards rushing in 78 attempts with four touchdowns. Shockley had a longest run of 40 yards and completed a 56-yard touchdown pass to tight end Martrez Milner for his longest pass play of the season—as both of these highlights occurred in the same game on September 3, 2005, against Boise State.

In Georgia's seventh game of the season against Arkansas, Shockley had to leave early in the second quarter with a sprained medial collateral ligament in his left knee. Because of his injury, he had to sit out Georgia's eighth game of the season against one of the school's most hated rivals, the University of Florida Gators, in the Florida vs. Georgia Football Classic. Redshirt junior Joe Tereshinski III was named the starter, and he finished the game completing 8-of-21 passes for 100 yards and an interception. Georgia lost the game, 14–10.

Shockley returned for the ninth game of the season on November 12 against the Auburn Tigers, but despite playing very well, completing 20-of-36 passes for 304 yards and two touchdowns and running eight times for another 40 yards, Georgia lost the game 31–30 on a last-second field goal to fall to 7–2 on the season. After beating the Georgia Tech Yellow Jackets 14–7, Georgia went on to play the LSU Tigers in the SEC Championship game. Shockley threw for two touchdowns and ran for another as Georgia won the game, 34–14, to claim the 2005 SEC Championship title. Shockley was named the MVP of the SEC Championship game.

The University of Georgia's football season and Shockley's collegiate career ended with a 38–35 loss to the West Virginia Mountaineers in the Nokia Sugar Bowl on January 2, 2006. Despite the loss, Shockley had an excellent performance throwing for 277 yards (on 20 completions in 33 attempts) and three touchdowns while running for 71 yards on eight carries.

Shockley won the FCA Bobby Bowden Football Player of the Year Award, finished third in the voting for the Associated Press Player of the Year, and led Georgia to a 10–3 record and the No. 10 ranking nationally by the AP College Football Poll during his senior year.

== Professional career ==
Pre-draft measurables
Height	Weight	Arm length	Hand span	40-yard dash	10-yard split	20-yard split	20-yard shuttle	Three-cone drill	Vertical jump	Broad jump	Wonderlic
6 ft 1 1/8 in (1.86 m)	214 lb (97 kg)	32 1/8 in (0.82 m)	9 in (0.23 m)	4.57 s	1.58 s	2.67 s	4.17 s	7.07 s	37.5 in (0.95 m)	10 ft 1 in (3.07 m)	19
All values from NFL Combine

=== Atlanta Falcons ===
Shockley was selected by the Atlanta Falcons in the seventh round of the 2006 NFL draft with the 223rd overall pick. He was the first University of Georgia player selected by the Falcons since 1994.

On August 27, 2006, then Falcons head coach Jim Mora announced that Shockley had made the team as the third-string quarterback (over Bryan Randall) and would lead the scout team.

Shockley missed the entire 2007 season after suffering a torn anterior cruciate ligament and damage to the medial collateral ligament in his left knee during a preseason game against the Buffalo Bills.

After the Atlanta Falcons picked Matt Ryan with their third overall pick in the 2008 draft, first year coach Mike Smith made every position open for competition. In a tough battle, hometown favorite Shockley secured the third string job over Joey Harrington. Subsequently, Harrington was released by the Falcons shortly after.

On September 5, 2009, Shockley was cut by the Falcons, but was signed to the practice squad on September 6. He was released from the practice squad October 21 to make room on the roster for running back Antone Smith. He was re-signed to the practice squad on December 1. After his contract expired following the season, Shockley was re-signed to a future contract on January 4, 2010. He was waived again on July 9.

=== Omaha Nighthawks (first stint) ===
Shockley did not allow much time for downtime as a professional football player following his release from the Falcons. He agreed to attend a minicamp with the Omaha Nighthawks of the United Football League (UFL) on July 19, 2010. Shockley signed with the team on August 23 and became a backup quarterback playing behind former Philadelphia Eagle Jeff Garcia. Omaha finished the season at 3–5, and Shockley completed 2-of-5 passes for 30 yards in limited playing time.

During the next season, Omaha re-signed Shockley to the team on July 15, 2011. The Nighthawks later released him during training camp on September 2.

=== Sacramento Mountain Lions ===
Shockley signed with the Sacramento Mountain Lions of the UFL on September 6, 2011. He was released on September 9, 2011.

=== Omaha Nighthawks (second stint) ===
On September 27, 2011, Shockley was re-signed by the Nighthawks due to their starter, Eric Crouch, being placed on injured reserve.

Shockley's Nighthawks finished the season at 1–4; their only win was on October 1 against Sacramento, 33–30.

== Career statistics ==
Legend
**Bold**	Career high

=== College ===
Year	Team	Passing							Rushing			
Year	Team	Cmp	Att	Pct	Yds	TD	Int	Rtg	Att	Yds	Avg	TD
2002	Georgia	32	52	**61.5**	415	5	2	**152.6**	36	107	3.0	2
2003	Georgia	9	21	42.9	88	1	1	84.2	16	101	**6.3**	1
2004	Georgia	26	60	43.3	464	4	1	127.0	24	113	4.7	0
2005	Georgia	**173**	**310**	55.8	**2,588**	**24**	**5**	148.3	**78**	**322**	4.1	**4**
Totals		240	443	54.2	3,555	34	9	142.8	154	643	4.2	7

=== UFL ===
Year	Team	Passing							Rushing			
Year	Team	Cmp	Att	Pct	Yds	Y/A	TD	Int	Att	Yds	Avg	TD
2010	Omaha	2	5	40.0	30	6.0	0	1	1	3	3.0	0
Career		2	5	40.0	30	6.0	0	1	1	3	3.0	0
