= List of Kentucky Wildcats starting quarterbacks =

This is a year-by-year list of every Kentucky Wildcats football team quarterback and the years they participated on the Kentucky Wildcats football team.

== Starting quarterbacks ==
=== 1933 to present ===
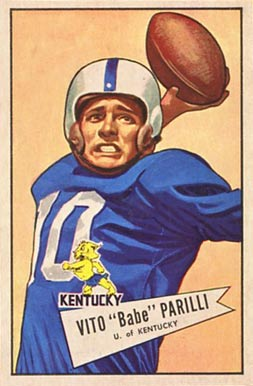
Babe Parilli

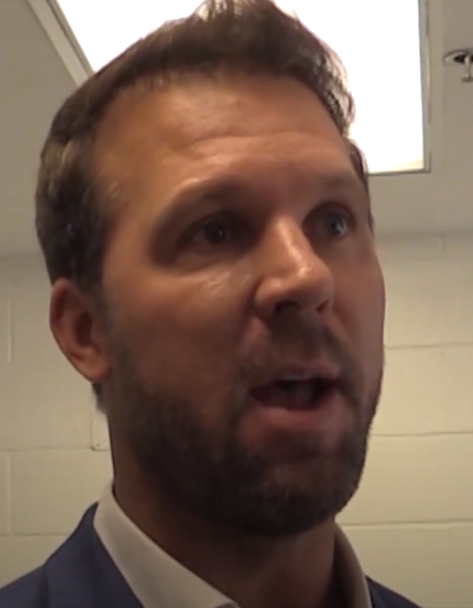
Tim Couch

The following players were the predominant quarterbacks for the Wildcats each season after the establishment of the Southeastern Conference.

==== Key ====
^{*}	Selected to the All-SEC team (First, Second, or Third team)
^{†}	Selected to an All-America team (First, Second, or Third team)
^{‡}	Won a postseason game (Bowl game)

Year	Player	Class	Games	Yards	TDs	INTs	Notes
2025	Cutter Boley	r-Fr.	10	2,160	15	12	–
2025	Zach Calzada	Gr.	2	238	0	2	–
2024	Brock Vandagriff	Sr.	11	1,593	10	8	–
2024	Cutter Boley	Fr.	1	338	2	4	–
2023	Devin Leary						
2022	Destin Wade						
2022	Kaiya Sherron						
2021–2022	Will Levis						
2019	Lynn Bowden						
2019	Sawyer Smith						
2018–2020	Terry Wilson						
2016–2017	Stephen Johnson						
2016	Luke Wright						
2015–2016	Drew Barker						
2014	Patrick Towles	r-So.	12	2,718	14	9	–
2013	Jalen Whitlow	So.	8	1,033	5	5	–
2013	Max Smith	r-So.	4	1,276	9	1	–
2012	Jalen Whitlow	So.	7	801	3	2	–
2012	Max Smith	So.	4	975	8	4	–
2012	Morgan Newton	Sr.	1	73	1	3	–
2011	Morgan Newton	Jr.	8	793	8	7	–
2011	Max Smith	Fr.	4	819	4	4	–
2011	Matt Roark	Sr.	1	15	0	0	Normally a wide receiver, Roark started the season's final game at quarterback against Tennessee after both of the Wildcats' quarterbacks were out injured.
2010	Mike Hartline	Sr.	12	3,178	23	9	–
2010	Morgan Newton	So.	1	265	0	0	–
2009	Morgan Newton	Fr.	8	706	6	3	–
2009	Mike Hartline	Jr.	5	806	6	7	–
2008	Mike Hartline^{‡}	So.	9	1,666	9	8	Won 2009 Liberty Bowl
2008	Randall Cobb	Fr.	4	542	2	5	–
2004–2007	Andre' Woodson*^{‡}	Sr.	13	3,709	40	11	Won 2007 Music City Bowl; 2007 Second Team All-SEC
2001–2004	Shane Boyd			2,484			
2000–2003	Jared Lorenzen			10,354	78	41	
1999	Dusty Bonner						
1996–1998	Tim Couch	Jr.	16	6,772	76	37	1999 NFL draft 1st Round, #1 Pick
1995–1996	Billy Jack Haskins						
1994–1995	Jeff Speedy						
1993–1994	Antonio O'Ferral						
1991–1993	Pookie Jones						
1990–1991	Brad Smith						
1989–1990	Freddie Maggard						
1988–1989	Glenn Fohr						
1985–1987	Kevin Dooley						
1984–1986	Bill Ransdell						
1982	Doug Martin						
1980–1983	Randy Jenkins						
1979	Terry Henry						
1978, 1980	Larry McCrimmon						Played in USFL
1976–1977	Derrick Ramsey						
1974–1975	Cliff Hite						
1973–1974	Mike Fanuzzi						
1969–1971	Bernie Scruggs						
1967–1968	Dave Bair						
1966	Terry Beadles						
1963–1965	Rick Norton						Played for NFL's Miami Dolphins.
1960–1962	Jerry Woolum						
1960	Jerry Eisaman						
1957–1959	Lowell Hughes						
1956	Delmar Hughes						
1953–1955	Bob Hardy						
1952	Steve Meilinger						
1949–1951	Babe Parilli						
1946–1948	George Blanda						Blanda played 26 seasons of professional football, the most in the sport's history, and had scored more points than anyone in history at the time of his retirement.
1941–1942; 1946	Phil Cutchin						
1940	Charles Jones Jr.						
1938–1939	Joe Shepherd						
1936–1937	Vincent Robinson						
1934–1935	Norris McMillin						
1933	Jack Jean						

=== 1922 to 1932 ===
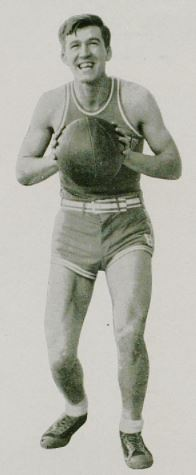
Carey Spicer on the basketball team.

The following players were the predominant quarterbacks for the Wildcats each season after the establishment of the Southern Conference until the establishment of the Southeastern Conference.

Name	Years Started	Notability	References
Ralph Kercheval	1932	All-Southern. He was chosen as the placekicker for an Associated Press Southeast Area All-Time football team 1920–1969 era.	
Carey Spicer	1929–1931	Spicer and Gilb were brothers-in-law. Spicer was a two-time All-American basketball player.	
Elmer Gilb	1928		
Gayle Mohney	1925–1927	Mohney also played basketball.	
Turner Gregg	1922–1924	Upset the Alabama team which had just beaten Penn in 1922. Beat Tennessee in 1924.	

=== 1896 to 1921 (incomplete) ===
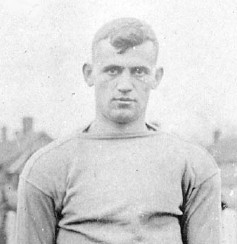
Doc Rodes

The following players were the predominant quarterbacks for the Wildcats each season after the establishment of the Southern Intercollegiate Athletic Association until the establishment of the Southern Conference.

Name	Years Started	Notability	References
Bobby Lavin	1919–1921	Also a guard on the 1921 SIAA champion basketball team, playing with Basil Hayden.	
Craig Riddle	1917		
Doc Rodes	1915–1916	All-Southern. Vanderbilt coach Dan McGugin stated "If you would give me Doc Rodes, I would say he was a greater player than Curry." Rodes was a cousin of earlier Kentucky football player William "Red Doc" Rodes, often called William while Black Doc is called Doc. "Doc" also had two brothers play football at Kentucky: J. W. "Boots" Rodes and Pete Rodes.	
Paul Hite	1914		
Parks	1911–1914		
Abe Roth	1912		
Les Guyn	1911		
Jake Gaiser	1910		
W.T. Johnson	1909		
Shelby Post	1908–1909	He also played basketball. He was a great-great-grandson of Isaac Shelby.	
Neville Stone	1906–1907		
Presley Atkins	1904–1905		
W. H. Grady	1903		
N. T. Hughes	1902		
Herman Scholtz	1901	Also a member of the "immortals". He once cross-dressed to attend a women's basketball game (women only in those days).	
Cronley Elliott	1900	He was a dentist and basketball official.	
Reese	1899		
Roscoe Severs	1897–1898	Captain of the 1898 "Immortals". He weighed 128 pounds.	
Walter Duncan	1896	Captain.	

=== 1891 to 1895 (incomplete) ===
The following players were the predominant quarters for the Wildcats each season the team was a non-conference independent team, following the birth of University of Kentucky football.

Name	Years Started	Notability	References
Smith Alford	1893, 1895	Captain of the 1895 team.	
George B. Carey	1893–1894	Father of Burgess Carey, the second UK basketball player named All-America.	
Dick Johnson	1892		
?	1891		
