= 2008 Kentucky Wildcats football team =

American college football season

2008 Kentucky Wildcats football

Liberty Bowl champion

Liberty Bowl, W 25–19 vs. East Carolina
- Conference: Southeastern Conference
- Eastern Division
- Record: 7–6 (2–6 SEC)
- Head coach: Rich Brooks (6th season)
- Offensive coordinator: Joker Phillips (4th season)
- Offensive scheme: Pro-style
- Defensive coordinator: Steve Brown (2nd season)
- Base defense: 4–3
- Home stadium: Commonwealth Stadium

2008 Southeastern Conference football standings
| | Conf. | | | Overall |
| Team | W | | L | W | | L |
|---|---|---|---|---|---|---|
Eastern Division
| No. 1 Florida x$# | 7 | – | 1 | 13 | – | 1 |
| No. 13 Georgia | 6 | – | 2 | 10 | – | 3 |
| Vanderbilt | 4 | – | 4 | 7 | – | 6 |
| South Carolina | 4 | – | 4 | 7 | – | 6 |
| Tennessee | 3 | – | 5 | 5 | – | 7 |
| Kentucky | 2 | – | 6 | 7 | – | 6 |
Western Division
| No. 6 Alabama x% | 8 | – | 0 | 12 | – | 2 |
| No. 14 Ole Miss | 5 | – | 3 | 9 | – | 4 |
| LSU | 3 | – | 5 | 8 | – | 5 |
| Arkansas | 2 | – | 6 | 5 | – | 7 |
| Auburn | 2 | – | 6 | 5 | – | 7 |
| Mississippi State | 2 | – | 6 | 4 | – | 8 |
Championship: Florida 31, Alabama 20
# – BCS National Champion; $ – BCS representative as conference champion; % – BCS at-large representative; x – Division champion/co-champions; Rankings from AP Poll

The 2008 Kentucky Wildcats football team represented the University of Kentucky in the college football season of 2008–2009. The team's head coach was Rich Brooks, who served his sixth year in the position. The Wildcats played their home games at Commonwealth Stadium in Lexington, Kentucky.

== Schedule ==
| Date | Time | Opponent | Site | TV | Result | Attendance | Source |
|---|---|---|---|---|---|---|---|
| August 31 | 3:30 pm | at Louisville* | Papa John's Cardinal Stadium; Louisville, KY (Governor's Cup) | ESPN | W 27–2 | 42,696 | |
| September 6 | 6:00 pm | Norfolk State* | Commonwealth Stadium; Lexington, KY | BBSN | W 38–3 | 69,118 | |
| September 13 | 7:00 pm | Middle Tennessee* | Commonwealth Stadium; Lexington, KY | BBSN | W 20–14 | 68,612 | |
| September 27 | 7:00 pm | Western Kentucky* | Commonwealth Stadium; Lexington, KY | BBSN | W 41–3 | 70,731 | |
| October 4 | 3:30 pm | at No. 2 Alabama | Bryant–Denny Stadium; Tuscaloosa, AL | CBS | L 14–17 | 92,138 | |
| October 11 | 12:30 pm | South Carolina | Commonwealth Stadium; Lexington, KY | Raycom | L 17–24 | 70,822 | |
| October 18 | 7:00 pm | Arkansas^{†} | Commonwealth Stadium; Lexington, KY | ESPNU | W 21–20 | 70,534 | |
| October 25 | 12:30 pm | at No. 5 Florida | Ben Hill Griffin Stadium; Gainesville, FL (rivalry) | Raycom | L 5–63 | 90,589 | |
| November 1 | 2:30 pm | at Mississippi State | Davis Wade Stadium; Starkville, MS | | W 14–13 | 40,168 | |
| November 8 | 12:30 pm | No. 14 Georgia | Commonwealth Stadium; Lexington, KY | Raycom | L 38–42 | 70,626 | |
| November 15 | 8:00 pm | Vanderbilt | Commonwealth Stadium; Lexington, KY (rivalry) | ESPN2 | L 24–31 | 65,595 | |
| November 29 | 6:45 pm | at Tennessee | Neyland Stadium; Knoxville, TN (rivalry) | ESPN2 | L 10–28 | 102,388 | |
| January 2 | 5:00 pm | vs. East Carolina* | Liberty Bowl Memorial Stadium; Memphis, TN (Liberty Bowl) | ESPN | W 25–19 | 56,125 | |
*Non-conference game; ^{†}Homecoming; Rankings from AP Poll released prior to the game; All times are in Eastern time

== Game summaries ==
=== Louisville ===
| | 1 | 2 | 3 | 4 | Total |
|---|---|---|---|---|---|
| **Wildcats** | 0 | 10 | 0 | 17 | **27** |
| Cardinals | 0 | 0 | 0 | 2 | **2** |

Starters

| Position | Number | Name | Height | Weight | Class | Hometown | Games↑ |
|---|---|---|---|---|---|---|---|
| **QB** | 5 | Mike Hartline | 6'6" | 205 | RS-So. | Canton, Ohio | 1 |
| TB | 28 | Tony Dixon | 5'9" | 203 | Sr. | Parrish, Alabama | 1 |
| **FB** | **38** | **John Conner** | **5'11"** | **230** | **Jr.** | **West Chester, Ohio** | **1** |
| **WR** | **12** | **Dicky Lyons** | **5'11"** | **190** | **Sr.** | **New Orleans, Louisiana** | **1** |
| WR | 17 | EJ Adams | 6'0" | 197 | Jr. | Stone Mountain, Georgia | 1 |
| TE | 40 | Maurice Grinter | 6'3" | 253 | Jr. | Louisville, Kentucky | 1 |
| **LT** | **79** | **Garry Williams** | **6-3** | **300** | **Sr.** | **Louisville, Kentucky** | **1** |
| **LG** | **72** | **Zipp Duncan** | **6'5"** | **295** | **Jr.** | **Magnolia, Kentucky** | **1** |
| C | 61 | Jorge González | 6'3" | 303 | Jr. | Tampa Bay, Florida | 1 |
| RG | 73 | Jess Beets | 6'2" | 293 | Sr. | Dove Canyon, California | 1 |
| **RT** | **76** | **Justin Jeffries** | **6'6"** | **310** | **Jr.** | **Louisville, Kentucky** | **1** |

- **bold** - Denotes returning starter
- ↑ - Denotes number of games started by the player at the listed position during the 2008 season.

| Position | Number | Name | Height | Weight | Class | Hometown | Games↑ |
|---|---|---|---|---|---|---|---|
| LE | **99** | **Jeremy Jarmon** | **6'3"** | **277 lb.** | **Jr.** | **Collierville, Tennessee** | **1** |
| LT | **98** | **Myron Pryor** | **6'1"** | **310 lb.** | **Sr.** | **Louisville, Kentucky** | **1** |
| RT | **91** | **Corey Peters** | **6'3"** | **290 lb.** | **Jr.** | **Louisville, Kentucky** | **1** |
| RE | **95** | **Ventrell Jenkins** | **6'2"** | **285 lb.** | **Sr.** | **Columbia, South Carolina** | **1** |
| OLB | **56** | **Braxton Kelley** | **6'0"** | **230 lb.** | **Sr.** | **LaGrange, Georgia** | **1** |
| MLB | 4 | Micah Johnson | 6'2" | 250 lb. | Jr. | Fort Campbell, Kentucky | 1 |
| SLB | **51** | **Johnny Williams** | **6'3"** | **244 lb.** | **Sr.** | **Jacksonville, Florida** | **1** |
| RCB | **32** | **Trevard Lindley** | **6'0"** | **175 lb.** | **Jr.** | **Hiram, Georgia** | **1** |
| LCB | 7 | David Jones | 5'10" | 180 lb. | Sr. | Red Jacket, West Virginia | 1 |
| FS | 27 | Ashton Cobb | 6'0" | 208 lb. | Jr. | Aliquippa, Pennsylvania | 1 |
| SS | **2** | **Marcus McClinton** | **6'1"** | **210 lb.** | **Sr.** | **Fort Campbell, Kentucky** | **1** |

- **bold** - Denotes returning starter
- ↑ - Denotes number of games started by the player at the listed position during the 2008 season.

Week 1 SEC Defensive Player of the Week
Myron Pryor
Defensive tackle
Kentucky
6-1 • 310 • Senior
Louisville, Ky. (Eastern HS)

=== Norfolk State ===
| | 1 | 2 | 3 | 4 | Total |
|---|---|---|---|---|---|
| Spartans | 0 | 0 | 3 | 0 | **3** |
| **Wildcats** | 7 | 14 | 3 | 14 | **38** |

Starters

| Position | Number | Name | Height | Weight | Class | Hometown | Games↑ |
|---|---|---|---|---|---|---|---|
| **QB** | **5** | **Mike Hartline** | **6'6"** | **205** | **RS-So.** | **Canton, Ohio** | **1** |
| **TB** | **28** | **Tony Dixon** | **5'9"** | **203** | **Sr.** | **Parrish, Alabama** | **1** |
| **FB** | **38** | **John Conner** | **5'11"** | **230** | **Jr.** | **West Chester, Ohio** | **1** |
| **WR** | **12** | **Dicky Lyons** | **5'11"** | **190** | **Sr.** | **New Orleans, Louisiana** | **1** |
| **WR** | 18 | Randall Cobb | 5'11" | 197 | Fr. | Alcoa, Tennessee | 0 |
| **TE** | **40** | **Maurice Grinter** | **6'3"** | **253** | **Jr.** | **Louisville, Kentucky** | **1** |
| **LT** | 52 | Billy Joe Murphy | 6'6" | 292 | Rs.-Fr. | Gamaliel, Kentucky | 0 |
| **LG** | **72** | **Zipp Duncan** | **6'5"** | **295** | **Jr.** | **Magnolia, Kentucky** | **1** |
| C | **61** | **Jorge González** | **6'3"** | **303** | **Jr.** | **Tampa Bay, Florida** | **1** |
| RG | **73** | **Jess Beets** | **6'2"** | **293** | **Sr.** | **Dove Canyon, California** | **1** |
| **RT** | **76** | **Justin Jeffries** | **6'6"** | **310** | **Jr.** | **Louisville, Kentucky** | **1** |

- **bold** - Denotes started previous game
- ↑ - Denotes number of games started by the player at the listed position during the 2008 season.

| Position | Number | Name | Height | Weight | Class | Hometown | Games↑ |
|---|---|---|---|---|---|---|---|
| LE | 99 | Jeremy Jarmon | 6'3" | 277 lb. | Jr. | Collierville, Tennessee | 1 |
| LT | 98 | Myron Pryor | 6'1" | 310 lb. | Sr. | Louisville, Kentucky | 1 |
| RT | 91 | Corey Peters | 6'3" | 290 lb. | Jr. | Louisville, Kentucky | 1 |
| RE | 95 | Ventrell Jenkins | 6'2" | 285 lb. | Sr. | Columbia, South Carolina | 1 |
| OLB | 56 | Braxton Kelley | 6'0" | 230 lb. | Sr. | LaGrange, Georgia | 1 |
| MLB | 4 | Micah Johnson | 6'2" | 250 lb. | Jr. | Fort Campbell, Kentucky | 1 |
| SLB | 51 | Johnny Williams | 6'3" | 244 lb. | Sr. | Jacksonville, Florida | 1 |
| RCB | 32 | Trevard Lindley | 6'0" | 175 lb. | Jr. | Hiram, Georgia | 1 |
| LCB | 7 | David Jones | 5'10" | 180 lb. | Sr. | Red Jacket, West Virginia | 1 |
| FS | 27 | Ashton Cobb | 6'0" | 208 lb. | Jr. | Aliquippa, Pennsylvania | 1 |
| SS | 2 | Marcus McClinton | 6'1" | 210 lb. | Sr. | Fort Campbell, Kentucky | 1 |

- **bold** - Denotes started previous game
- ↑ - Denotes number of games started by the player at the listed position during the 2008 season.

=== Middle Tennessee ===
| | 1 | 2 | 3 | 4 | Total |
|---|---|---|---|---|---|
| Blue Raiders | 7 | 0 | 7 | 0 | **14** |
| **Wildcats** | 7 | 3 | 0 | 10 | **20** |

| Position | Number | Name | Height | Weight | Class | Hometown | Games↑ |
|---|---|---|---|---|---|---|---|
| QB | 5 | Mike Hartline | 6'6" | 205 | RS-So. | Canton, Ohio | 3 |
| TB | 28 | Tony Dixon | 5'9" | 203 | Sr. | Parrish, Alabama | 3 |
| FB | 38 | John Conner | 5'11" | 230 | Jr. | West Chester, Ohio | 3 |
| WR | 12 | Dicky Lyons | 5'11" | 190 | Sr. | New Orleans, Louisiana | 3 |
| WR | 81 | Kyrus Lanxter | 6'3" | 193 | So. | Alcoa, Tennessee | 1 |
| TE | 80 | T.C. Drake | 6'6" | 242 | Jr. | Bardstown, Kentucky | 1 |
| LT | 52 | Billy Joe Murphy | 6'6" | 292 | Rs-Fr. | Gamaliel, Kentucky | 2 |
| LG | 72 | Zipp Duncan | 6'5" | 295 | Jr. | Magnolia, Kentucky | 3 |
| C | 61 | Jorge González | 6'3" | 303 | Jr. | Tampa Bay, Florida | 3 |
| RG | 73 | Jess Beets | 6'2" | 293 | Sr. | Dove Canyon, California | 3 |
| RT | 76 | Justin Jeffries | 6'6" | 310 | Jr. | Louisville, Kentucky | 3 |

| Position | Number | Name | Height | Weight | Class | Hometown | Games↑ |
|---|---|---|---|---|---|---|---|
| LE | 99 | Jeremy Jarmon | 6'3" | 277 lb. | Jr. | Collierville, Tennessee | 3 |
| LT | 98 | Myron Pryor | 6'1" | 310 lb. | Sr. | Louisville, Kentucky | 3 |
| RT | 91 | Corey Peters | 6'3" | 290 lb. | Jr. | Louisville, Kentucky | 3 |
| RE | 95 | Ventrell Jenkins | 6'2" | 285 lb. | Sr. | Columbia, South Carolina | 3 |
| OLB | 56 | Braxton Kelley | 6'0" | 230 lb. | Sr. | LaGrange, Georgia | 3 |
| MLB | 4 | Micah Johnson | 6'2" | 250 lb. | Jr. | Fort Campbell, Kentucky | 3 |
| SLB | 51 | Johnny Williams | 6'3" | 244 lb. | Sr. | Jacksonville, Florida | 3 |
| RCB | 32 | Trevard Lindley | 6'0" | 175 lb. | Jr. | Hiram, Georgia | 3 |
| LCB | 7 | David Jones | 5'10" | 180 lb. | Sr. | Red Jacket, West Virginia | 3 |
| FS | 27 | Ashton Cobb | 6'0" | 208 lb. | Jr. | Aliquippa, Pennsylvania | 2 |
| SS | 2 | Marcus McClinton | 6'1" | 210 lb. | Sr. | Fort Campbell, Kentucky | 2 |

SEC Offensive Player of the Week
Mike Hartline
Quarterback
Kentucky
6-6 • 204 • Sophomore
Canton, Ohio (GlenOak HS)

=== Western Kentucky ===
| | 1 | 2 | 3 | 4 | Total |
|---|---|---|---|---|---|
| Hilltoppers | 0 | 3 | 0 | 0 | **3** |
| **Wildcats** | 3 | 14 | 14 | 10 | **41** |

| Position | Number | Name | Height | Weight | Class | Hometown | Games↑ |
|---|---|---|---|---|---|---|---|
| QB | **5** | **Mike Hartline** | **6'6"** | **205** | **RS-So.** | **Canton, Ohio** | **4** |
| TB | **28** | **Tony Dixon** | **5'9"** | **203** | **Sr.** | **Parrish, Alabama** | **4** |
| FB | **38** | **John Conner** | **5'11"** | **230** | **Jr.** | **West Chester, Ohio** | **4** |
| WR | **12** | **Dicky Lyons** | **5'11"** | **190** | **Sr.** | **New Orleans, Louisiana** | **4** |
| WR | 17 | EJ Adams | 6'0" | 175 | Jr. | Stone Mountain, Georgia | 2 |
| TE | **80** | **T.C. Drake** | **6'6"** | **242** | **Jr.** | **Bardstown, Kentucky** | **2** |
| LT | 79 | Garry Williams | 6'3" | 303 | Sr. | Louisville, Kentucky | 2 |
| LG | **72** | **Zipp Duncan** | **6'5"** | **295** | **Jr.** | **Magnolia, Kentucky** | **4** |
| C | **61** | **Jorge González** | **6'3"** | **303** | **Jr.** | **Tampa Bay, Florida** | **4** |
| RG | **73** | **Jess Beets** | **6'2"** | **293** | **Sr.** | **Dove Canyon, California** | **4** |
| RT | **76** | **Justin Jeffries** | **6'6"** | **310** | **Jr.** | **Louisville, Kentucky** | **4** |

| Position | Number | Name | Height | Weight | Class | Hometown | Games↑ |
|---|---|---|---|---|---|---|---|
| LE | **99** | **Jeremy Jarmon** | **6'3"** | **277 lb.** | **Jr.** | **Collierville, Tennessee** | **4** |
| LT | **98** | **Myron Pryor** | **6'1"** | **310 lb.** | **Sr.** | **Louisville, Kentucky** | **4** |
| RT | **91** | **Corey Peters** | **6'3"** | **290 lb.** | **Jr.** | **Louisville, Kentucky** | **4** |
| RE | **95** | **Ventrell Jenkins** | **6'2"** | **285 lb.** | **Sr.** | **Columbia, South Carolina** | **4** |
| OLB | 21 | Michael Schwindel | 6'2" | 220 lb. | Jr. | **Hawesville, Kentucky** | 0 |
| MLB | **56** | **Braxton Kelley** | **6'0"** | **230 lb.** | **Sr.** | **LaGrange, Georgia** | **4** |
| SLB | **51** | **Johnny Williams** | **6'3"** | **244 lb.** | **Sr.** | **Jacksonville, Florida** | **4** |
| RCB | **32** | **Trevard Lindley** | **6'0"** | **175 lb.** | **Jr.** | **Hiram, Georgia** | **4** |
| LCB | **7** | **David Jones** | **5'10"** | **180 lb.** | **Sr.** | **Red Jacket, West Virginia** | **4** |
| FS | 10 | Matt Lentz | 6'3" | 209 lb. | Fr. | Simpsonville, South Carolina | 0 |
| SS | **2** | **Marcus McClinton** | **6'1"** | **210 lb.** | **Sr.** | **Fort Campbell, Kentucky** | **4** |

SEC Offensive Lineman of the Week
Garry Williams
Tackle
Kentucky
6-3 • 300 • Senior
Louisville, Ky. (Seneca HS)

=== Alabama ===
| | 1 | 2 | 3 | 4 | Total |
|---|---|---|---|---|---|
| Wildcats | 0 | 0 | 7 | 7 | **14** |
| **Crimson Tide** | 14 | 0 | 0 | 3 | **17** |

| Position | Number | Name | Height | Weight | Class | Hometown | Games↑ |
|---|---|---|---|---|---|---|---|
| **QB** | **5** | **Mike Hartline** | **6'6"** | '205 | **So.** | **Canton, Ohio** | **5** |
| **TB** | **28** | **Tony Dixon** | '5'9" | **203** | **Sr.** | **Parrish, Alabama** | **5** |
| **FB** | **38** | **John Conner** | **5'11"** | **230** | **Jr.** | **West Chester, Ohio** | **5** |
| **WR** | **12** | **Dicky Lyons** | **5'11"** | **190** | **Sr.** | **New Orleans, Louisiana** | **5** |
| WR | 17 | EJ Adams | 6'0" | 197 | Jr. | Stone Mountain, Georgia | 3 |
| **TE** | **80** | **T.C. Drake** | 6'6"' | **242** | **Jr.** | **Bardstown, Kentucky** | **4** |
| **LT** | **79** | **Garry Williams** | **6'3"** | **300** | **Sr.** | **Louisville, Kentucky** | **3** |
| **LG** | **72** | **Zipp Duncan** | **6'5"** | **295** | **Jr.** | **Magnolia, Kentucky** | **5** |
| C | **61** | **Jorge González** | **6'3"** | **303** | **Jr.** | **Tampa Bay, Florida** | **5** |
| RG | **73** | **Jess Beets** | **6'2"** | **293** | **Sr.** | **Dove Canyon, California** | **5** |
| **RT** | 72 | Brad Durham | 6'4" | 310 | So. | Mount Vernon, Kentucky | 1 |

| Position | Number | Name | Height | Weight | Class | Hometown | Games↑ |
|---|---|---|---|---|---|---|---|
| LE | **99** | **Jeremy Jarmon** | **6'3"** | **277 lb.** | **Jr.** | **Collierville, Tennessee** | **5** |
| LT | **98** | **Myron Pryor** | **6'1"** | **310 lb.** | **Sr.** | **Louisville, Kentucky** | **5** |
| RT | **91** | **Corey Peters** | **6'3"** | **290 lb.** | **Jr.** | **Louisville, Kentucky** | **5** |
| RE | **95** | **Ventrell Jenkins** | **6'2"** | **285 lb.** | **Sr.** | **Columbia, South Carolina** | **5** |
| OLB | **21** | **Michael Schwindel** | **6'1"** | **220 lb.** | **Jr.** | **Hawesville, Kentucky** | **2** |
| MLB | **56** | **Braxton Kelley** | **6'0"** | **230 lb.** | **Sr.** | **LaGrange, Georgia** | **5** |
| SLB | **51** | **Johnny Williams** | **6'3"** | **244 lb.** | **Sr.** | **Jacksonville, Florida** | **5** |
| RCB | **32** | **Trevard Lindley** | **6'0"** | **175 lb.** | **Jr.** | **Hiram, Georgia** | **5** |
| LCB | **7** | **David Jones** | **5'10"** | **180 lb.** | **Sr.** | **Red Jacket, West Virginia** | **5** |
| FS | 33 | Calvin Harrison | 6'1" | 197 lb. | Jr. | Columbia, South Carolina | 1 |
| SS | **2** | **Marcus McClinton** | **6'1"** | **210 lb.** | **Sr.** | **Fort Campbell, Kentucky** | **5** |

=== South Carolina ===
| | 1 | 2 | 3 | 4 | Total |
|---|---|---|---|---|---|
| **Gamecocks** | 7 | 7 | 0 | 10 | **24** |
| Wildcats | 7 | 10 | 0 | 0 | **17** |

| Position | Number | Name | Height | Weight | Class | Hometown | Games↑ |
|---|---|---|---|---|---|---|---|
| **QB** | **5** | **Mike Hartline** | **6'6"** | **205** | **So.** | **Canton, Ohio** | **6** |
| TB | 20 | Derrick Locke | 5'10" | 190 | So. | Hugo, Oklahoma | 1 |
| **FB** | **38** | **John Conner** | **5'11"** | **230** | **Jr.** | **West Chester, Ohio** | **6** |
| **WR** | **12** | **Dicky Lyons** | **5'11"** | **190** | **Sr.** | **New Orleans, Louisiana** | **6** |
| **WR** | **17** | **EJ Adams** | **6'0"** | **197** | **Jr.** | **Stone Mountain, Georgia** | **4** |
| **TE** | **80** | **T.C. Drake** | **6'6"** | **242** | **Jr.** | **Bardstown, Kentucky** | **5** |
| **LT** | **79** | **Garry Williams** | **6'3"** | **300** | **Sr.** | **Louisville, Kentucky** | **4** |
| **LG** | **72** | **Zipp Duncan** | **6'5"** | **295** | **Jr.** | **Magnolia, Kentucky** | **6** |
| **C** | **61** | **Jorge González** | **6'3"** | **303** | **Jr.** | **Tampa Bay, Florida** | **6** |
| **RG** | **73** | **Jess Beets** | **6'2"** | **293** | **Sr.** | **Dove Canyon, California** | **6** |
| **RT** | 72 | Brad Durham | 6'4" | 310 | So. | Mount Vernon, Kentucky | 1 |

| Position | Number | Name | Height | Weight | Class | Hometown | Games↑ |
|---|---|---|---|---|---|---|---|
| LE | **99** | **Jeremy Jarmon** | **6'3"** | **277 lb.** | **Jr.** | **Collierville, Tennessee** | **6** |
| LT | **98** | **Myron Pryor** | **6'1"** | **310 lb.** | **Sr.** | **Louisville, Kentucky** | **6** |
| RT | **91** | **Corey Peters** | **6'3"** | **290 lb.** | **Jr.** | **Louisville, Kentucky** | **6** |
| RE | **95** | **Ventrell Jenkins** | **6'2"** | **285 lb.** | **Sr.** | **Columbia, South Carolina** | **6** |
| OLB | **56** | **Braxton Kelley** | **6'0"** | **230 lb.** | **Sr.** | **LaGrange, Georgia** | **6** |
| MLB | 4 | Micah Johnson | 6'2" | 250 lb. | Jr. | Fort Campbell, Kentucky | 4 |
| SLB | **51** | **Johnny Williams** | **6'3"** | **244 lb.** | **Sr.** | **Jacksonville, Florida** | **6** |
| RCB | **32** | **Trevard Lindley** | **6'0"** | **175 lb.** | **Jr.** | **Hiram, Georgia** | **6** |
| LCB | **7** | **David Jones** | **5'10"** | **180 lb.** | **Sr.** | **Red Jacket, West Virginia** | **6** |
| FS | 10 | Matt Lentz | 6'3" | 203 lb. | Rs-Fr. | Simpsonville, South Carolina | 2 |
| SS | **2** | **Marcus McClinton** | **6'1"** | **210 lb.** | **Sr.** | **Fort Campbell, Kentucky** | **6** |

=== Arkansas ===
| | 1 | 2 | 3 | 4 | Total |
|---|---|---|---|---|---|
| Razorbacks | 7 | 7 | 3 | 3 | **20** |
| **Wildcats** | 0 | 0 | 7 | 14 | **21** |

| Position | Number | Name | Height | Weight | Class | Hometown | Games↑ |
|---|---|---|---|---|---|---|---|
| QB | **5** | **Mike Hartline** | **6'6"** | **205** | **So.** | **Canton, Ohio** | **6** |
| TB | **20** | **Derrick Locke** | **5'10"** | **190** | **So.** | **Hugo, Oklahoma** | **1** |
| FB | **38** | **John Conner** | **5'11"** | **230** | **Jr.** | **West Chester, Ohio** | **6** |
| WR | **12** | **Randall Cobb** | **5'11"** | **185** | **Fr.** | **Alcoa, Tennessee** | **4** |
| WR | 22 | Aaron Boyd | 6'3" | 210 | Fr. | Lexington, Kentucky | 0 |
| TE | **80** | **T.C. Drake** | **6'6"** | **242** | **Jr.** | **Bardstown, Kentucky** | **5** |
| LT | **79** | **Garry Williams** | **6'3"** | **300** | **Sr.** | **Louisville, Kentucky** | **4** |
| LG | **72** | **Zipp Duncan** | **6'5"** | **295** | **Jr.** | **Magnolia, Kentucky** | **6** |
| C | **61** | **Jorge González** | **6'3"** | **303** | **Jr.** | **Tampa Bay, Florida** | **6** |
| RG | **73** | **Jess Beets** | **6'2"** | **293** | **Sr.** | **Dove Canyon, California** | **6** |
| RT | **72** | **Brad Durham** | **6'4"** | **310** | **So.** | **Mount Vernon, Kentucky** | **1** |

| Position | Number | Name | Height | Weight | Class | Hometown | Games↑ |
|---|---|---|---|---|---|---|---|
| LE | 99 | Jeremy Jarmon | 6'3" | 277 lb. | Jr. | Collierville, Tennessee | 6 |
| LT | 98 | Myron Pryor | 6'1" | 310 lb. | Sr. | Louisville, Kentucky | 6 |
| RT | 91 | Corey Peters | 6'3" | 290 lb. | Jr. | Louisville, Kentucky | 6 |
| RE | 95 | Ventrell Jenkins | 6'2" | 285 lb. | Sr. | Columbia, South Carolina | 6 |
| OLB | 56 | Braxton Kelley | 6'0" | 230 lb. | Sr. | LaGrange, Georgia | 6 |
| MLB | 4 | Micah Johnson | 6'2" | 250 lb. | Jr. | Fort Campbell, Kentucky | 4 |
| SLB | 51 | Johnny Williams | 6'3" | 244 lb. | Sr. | Jacksonville, Florida | 6 |
| RCB | 32 | Trevard Lindley | 6'0" | 175 lb. | Jr. | Hiram, Georgia | 6 |
| LCB | 7 | David Jones | 5'10" | 180 lb. | Sr. | Red Jacket, West Virginia | 6 |
| FS | 10 | Matt Lentz | 6'3" | 203 lb. | Rs-Fr. | Simpsonville, South Carolina | 2 |
| SS | 2 | Marcus McClinton | 6'1" | 210 lb. | Sr. | Fort Campbell, Kentucky | 6 |

=== Florida ===
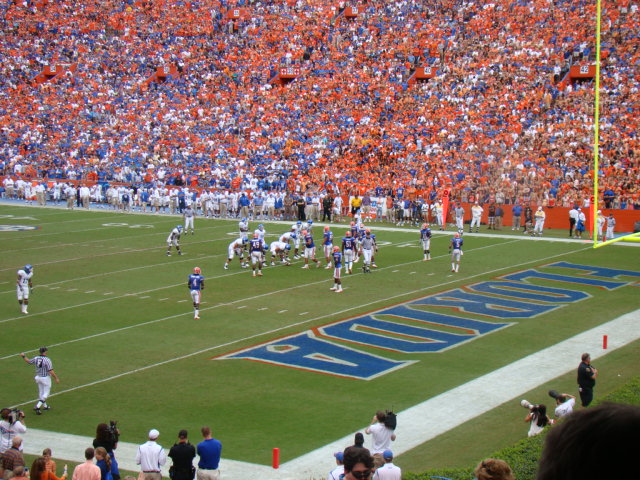
End zone at Florida Gators (October 25, 2008)

| | 1 | 2 | 3 | 4 | Total |
|---|---|---|---|---|---|
| Wildcats | 0 | 3 | 0 | 2 | **5** |
| **Gators** | 28 | 14 | 14 | 7 | **63** |

=== Mississippi State ===
| | 1 | 2 | 3 | 4 | Total |
|---|---|---|---|---|---|
| **Wildcats** | 0 | 0 | 14 | 0 | **14** |
| Bulldogs | 7 | 0 | 6 | 0 | **13** |

Prior to 2023, this was the last season in which the Wildcats have won a game in Starkville, Mississippi.

=== Georgia ===
| | 1 | 2 | 3 | 4 | Total |
|---|---|---|---|---|---|
| **Bulldogs** | 14 | 7 | 7 | 14 | **42** |
| Wildcats | 7 | 7 | 10 | 14 | **38** |

=== Vanderbilt ===
| | 1 | 2 | 3 | 4 | Total |
|---|---|---|---|---|---|
| **Commodores** | 7 | 14 | 7 | 0 | **28** |
| Wildcats | 0 | 7 | 14 | 0 | **21** |

=== Tennessee ===
| | 1 | 2 | 3 | 4 | Total |
|---|---|---|---|---|---|
| Wildcats | 3 | 0 | 0 | 7 | **10** |
| Volunteers | 0 | 7 | 7 | 14 | **28** |

=== East Carolina ===
| | 1 | 2 | 3 | 4 | Total |
|---|---|---|---|---|---|
| Pirates | 3 | 13 | 3 | 0 | **19** |
| Wildcats | 0 | 3 | 13 | 9 | **25** |

== Rankings ==
Ranking movements Legend: ██ Increase in ranking ██ Decrease in ranking — = Not ranked
| | Week | | | | | | | | | | | | | | | |
| Poll | Pre | 1 | 2 | 3 | 4 | 5 | 6 | 7 | 8 | 9 | 10 | 11 | 12 | 13 | 14 | Final |
|---|---|---|---|---|---|---|---|---|---|---|---|---|---|---|---|---|
| AP | — | 38 | 35 | 37 | 36 | 28 | 33 | — | — | — | — | — | — | — | — | — |
| Coaches | 42 | 34 | 29 | 30 | 32 | 28 | 32 | — | — | — | — | — | — | — | — | — |
| Harris | Not released | | | | | 30 | 34 | — | — | — | — | — | — | — | — | Not released |
| BCS | Not released | | | | | | | — | — | — | — | — | — | — | — | Not released |

== Statistics ==
=== Team ===
| | UK | Opp |
|---|---|---|
| Scoring | 294 | 279 |
| Points per Game | 22.6 | 21.5 |
| First Downs | 212 | 209 |
| Rushing | 96 | 96 |
| Passing | 98 | 94 |
| Penalty | 18 | 15 |
| Total Offense | 3891 | 4321 |
| Avg per Play | 4.5 | 5.2 |
| Avg per Game | 299.3 | 332.4 |
| Fumbles-Lost | 19-8 | 27-14 |
| Penalties-Yards | 69-562 | 74-685 |
| Avg per Game | 43.2 | 52.7 |

| | UK | Opp |
|---|---|---|
| Punts-Yards | 77-3213 | 75-3065 |
| Net Avg per Punt | 41.7 | 40.9 |
| Time of Possession/Game | 29:27 | 30:33 |
| 3rd Down Conversions | 61/194 | 62/187 |
| 4th Down Conversions | 10/19 | 8/17 |
| Touchdowns Scored | 36 | 36 |
| Field Goals-Attempts | 14-25 | 9-23 |
| PAT-Attempts | 34-36 | 34-36 |
| Attendance | 486038 | 367979 |
| Games/Avg per Game | 7/69434 | 5/73596 |

==== Scores by quarter ====
| | 1 | 2 | 3 | 4 | Total |
|---|---|---|---|---|---|
| Kentucky | 34 | 71 | 78 | 111 | 294 |
| Opponents | 101 | 71 | 41 | 66 | 279 |

=== Offense ===
==== Rushing ====
| Name | GP-GS | Att | Gain | Loss | Net | Avg | TD | Long | Avg/G |
|---|---|---|---|---|---|---|---|---|---|
| Derrick Locke | 7-0 | 63 | 319 | 16 | 303 | 4.8 | 1 | 68 | 43.3 |
| Moncell Allen | 12-0 | 38 | 206 | 4 | 202 | 5.3 | 1 | 38 | 16.8 |
| Randall Cobb | 11-0 | 79 | 401 | 85 | 316 | 4.0 | 7 | 18 | 28.7 |
| Alfonso Smith | 13-0 | 74 | 342 | 29 | 313 | 4.2 | 2 | 38 | 24.1 |
| Tony Dixon | 13-0 | 132 | 472 | 42 | 430 | 3.3 | 7 | 15 | 33.1 |
| Trey Bowland | 2-0 | 7 | 18 | 1 | 17 | 2.4 | 0 | 8 | 8.5 |
| John Conner (American football) | 13-0 | 15 | 48 | 1 | 47 | 3.1 | 0 | 9 | 3.6 |
| Mike Hartline | 11-0 | 24 | 54 | 63 | -9 | -0.4 | 0 | 9 | -0.8 |

==== Passing ====
| Name | GP-GS | Effic | Att-Cmp-Int | Pct | Yds | TD | Lng | Avg/G |
|---|---|---|---|---|---|---|---|---|
| Mike Hartline | 11-9 | 104.7 | 172-311-8 | 55.3 | 1666 | 9 | 71 | 151.5 |
| Randall Cobb | 11-4 | 95.1 | 52-99-5 | 52.5 | 542 | 2 | 37 | 47.9 |
| Will Fidler | 3-0 | 129.6 | 3-4-0 | 75.0 | 26 | 0 | 16 | 8.7 |

==== Receiving ====
| Name | GP-GS | No. | Yds | Avg | TD | Long | Avg/G |
|---|---|---|---|---|---|---|---|
| Joe Smith | | | | | | | |
| Total | | | | | | | |
| Opponents | | | | | | | |

=== Defense ===
| Name | GP | Tackles | | | | Sacks | Pass Defense | | Interceptions | | | | Fumbles | | Blkd Kick |
| Name | GP | Solo | Ast | Total | TFL-Yds | No-Yds | BrUp | QBH | No.-Yds | Avg | TD | Long | Rcv-Yds | FF | Blkd Kick |
|---|---|---|---|---|---|---|---|---|---|---|---|---|---|---|---|
| Total | | | | | | | | | | | | | | | |

=== Special teams ===
| Name | Punting | | | | | | | | Kickoffs | | | | |
| Name | No. | Yds | Avg | Long | TB | FC | I20 | Blkd | No. | Yds | Avg | TB | OB |
|---|---|---|---|---|---|---|---|---|---|---|---|---|---|
| Total | | | | | | | | | | | | | |

| Name | Punt returns | | | | | Kick returns | | | | |
| Name | No. | Yds | Avg | TD | Long | No. | Yds | Avg | TD | Long |
|---|---|---|---|---|---|---|---|---|---|---|
| Total | | | | | | | | | | |

== Roster ==
2008 Kentucky Wildcats football team roster
Players
Coaches
Offense

| Pos. | # | Name | Class |
|---|---|---|---|
| QB | 1 | Will Fidler | So |
| WR | 3 | Matt Roark | Fr |
| QB | 5 | Mike Hartline | So |
| WR | 7 | David Jones | Sr |
| WR | 8 | DeMoreo Ford | Sr |
| QB | 10 | Matt Lentz | So |
| WR | 12 | Dicky Lyons Jr. | Sr |
| WR | 13 | Eric Adeyemi | Fr |
| QB | 16 | Deaunte Mason | Fr |
| QB | 17 | Tyler Sargent | So |
| QB/WR | 18 | Randall Cobb | Fr |
| RB | 20 | Derrick Locke | So |
| WR | 22 | Aaron Boyd | Fr |
| RB | 28 | Tony Dixon | Sr |
| RB | 29 | Alfonso Smith | Jr |
| RB | 30 | Moncell Allen | So |
| RB | 33 | Antoine Brown | Jr |
| RB | 37 | Trey Bowland | So |
| FB | 38 | John Conner | Jr |
| FB | 40 | Maurice Grinter | Jr |
| FB | 43 | Stephen Ball | So |
| FB | 47 | Matt Ramsey | So |
| WR | 49 | Antonio Thomas | So |
| OT | 52 | Billy Joe Murphy | So |
| G | 59 | Dave Ulinski | Fr |
| G | 60 | Dustin Luck | Jr |
| C | 61 | Jorge Gonzalez | Jr |
| G | 63 | Jake Lanefski | So |
| G | 64 | Osaze Idumwonyi | Fr |
| OT | 66 | Chandler Burden | Fr |
| G | 68 | Michael Williams | Jr |
| OT | 70 | Stuart Hines | So |
| G | 72 | Zipp Duncan | Jr |
| G | 73 | Jess Beets | Sr |
| OT | 74 | Trevino Woods | Fr |
| OT | 75 | Brad Durham | So |
| OT | 76 | Justin Jeffries | Jr |
| G | 77 | Marcus Davis | So |
| G | 78 | Christian Johnson | Sr |
| OT | 79 | Garry Williams | Sr |
| TE | 80 | T.C. Drake | Jr |
| WR | 81 | Kyrus Lanxter | So |
| TE | 82 | Tyler Sexton | Jr |
| WR | 83 | E.J. Fields | Fr |
| WR | 85 | Gene McCaskill | Fr |
| TE | 86 | Ross Bogue | Jr |
| TE | 88 | Chris Goode | So |
| TE | 89 | Sean Stackhouse | Fr |

Defense

| Pos. | # | Name | Class |
|---|---|---|---|
| DB | 6 | Taiedo Smith | So |
| DB | 14 | Anthony Mosley | So |
| DE | 45 | Antwane Glenn | So |
| DT | 53 | Ricky Lumpkin | So |
| DT | 60 | Shane McCord | So |
| DE | 62 | Greg Meisner | So |
| DT | 90 | Matt Smith | Fr |
| DT | 91 | Corey Peters | Jr |
| DT | 93 | Austin Moss | Jr |
| DT | 95 | Ventrell Jenkins | Sr |
| DT | 98 | Myron Pryor | Sr |

Special teams

| Pos. | # | Name | Class |

Head coach

- Rich Brooks

Coordinators/assistant coaches

- Joker Phillips
  Offensive coordinator/wide receivers
- Randy Sanders
  Quarterbacks Coach
- Larry Brown
  Running backs
- Steve Ortameyer
  Tight ends
- Jimmy Heggins
  Offensive line
- Steve Brown
  Defensive coordinator
- Rick Petri
  Defensive line
- Chuck Smith
  Linebackers
- Chris Thurmond
  Defensive backs

Legend

- (C) Team captain
- (S) Suspended
- (I) Ineligible
- Injured
- Redshirt

Roster
Last update: August 1, 2017

| Quarterbacks: 1 Will Fidler QB - So; 3 Matt Roark QB - Fr; 5 Mike Hartline QB - So; 10 Matt Lentz QB - So; 16 Deaunte Mason QB - Fr; 17 Tyler Sargent QB - So; 18 Randall Cobb QB - Fr; Wide receivers: 6 Taiedo Smith WR/DB - So; 7 David Jones WR - Sr; 8 DeMoreo Ford WR - Sr; 12 Dicky Lyons Jr. WR - Jr; 13 Eric Adeyemi WR -Fr; 14 Anthony Mosley WR - So; 22 Aaron Boyd WR -Fr; 26 Terrence Jones WR - So; 48 Jayce Long WR - So; 49 Antonio Thomas WR/DB - So; 81 Kyrus Lanxter WR - So; 83 Anthony Stewart WR - Sr; 83 Courtney Gholson WR - So; 83 EJ Fields DB - Fr; 84 Chris Wraley WR - Jr; 85 Gene McCaskill WR - Fr; 87 Andre Henderson WR - So; Offensive linemen: 52 Billy Joe Murphy OL - So; 59 Dave Ulinski OL - Fr; 60 Dustin Luck OL - Jr; 61 Jorge Gonzalez C - Jr; 63 Jake Lanefski OL - So; 64 Osaze Idumwonyi OL - Fr; 66 Chandler Burden OL -Fr; 68 Michael Williams OL - Jr; 70 Stuart Hines OL - So; 72 Zipp Duncan OT - Jr; 73 Jess Beets OG - Sr; 74 Trevino Woods OL - Fr; 74 Joe Fischer OT - Sr; 75 Brad Durham OL - So; 76 Justin Jeffries OT - Jr; 77 Marcus Davis OL - So; 78 Christian Johnson OL - Sr; 79 Garry Williams OT - Sr; Tight ends: 80 T.C. Drake TE - Jr; 82 Tyler Sexton TE - Jr; 86 Ross Bogue TE - Jr; 88 Chris Goode TE - So; 89 Sean Stackhouse TE - Fr | Running backs: 20 Derrick Locke RB - So; 28 Tony Dixon RB - Sr; 29 Alfonso Smith RB - Jr; 30 Moncell Allen RB - So; 33 Antoine Brown RB - Jr; 37 Trey Bowland RB - So; Fullbacks: 38 John Conner FB - Jr; 40 Maurice Grinter FB - Jr; 43 Stephen Ball FB - So; 47 Matt Ramsey FB - So; Defensive tackles: 53 Ricky Lumpkin DT - So; 90 Matthew Smith DT - Fr; 91 Corey Peters DT - Jr; 93 Austin Moss DT - Jr; 95 Ventrell Jenkins DT - Sr; 98 Myron Pryor DT - Sr; Defensive linemen: 60 Shane McCord DL - So; 67 Joe Scott DL - So; Defensive ends: 39 Courtney Coffey DE - So; 45 Antwane Glenn DE - So; 62 Greg Meisner DE - So; 67 Charles Mustafaa DE - So; 69 B.J. Wiedemann DE - So; 90 Jamil Paris DE - Jr; 92 Josh Minton DE - So; 96 Collins Ukwu DE - Fr; 97 Nii Adjei Oninku DE - Sr; 99 Jeremy Jarmon DE - Jr | Linebackers: 4 Micah Johnson LB - Jr; 39 William Johnson DB - Fr; 41 Danny Trevathan LB - Fr; 41 Ben Bates LB - Jr; 42 Chris Cessna LB - So; 43 Mikhail Mabry LB - Jr; 46 Ronnie Sneed LB - So; 47 A.J. Nance LB - Jr; 50 Sam Maxwell LB - Jr; 51 Johnny Williams LB - Sr; 54 Brandon Thurmond LB - So; 56 Braxton Kelley LB - Sr; 57 Jacob Dufrene LB - So; 94 Taylor Wyndham LB - Fr; Defensive backs: 2 Marcus McClinton DB - Sr; 11 Greg Wilson DB - So; 15 Chris Drayton DB - So; 19 Winston Guy DB - Fr; 21 Michael Schwindel DB - Jr; 23 Shomari Moore DB - Sr; 24 Randall Burden DB - So; 25 Ahmad Grigsby Jr DB - So; 27 Ashton Cobb DB - Jr; 31 Jordan Nevels DB - Jr; 32 Trevard Lindley DB - So; 33 Calvin Harrison DB - Jr; 34 Paul Warford DB - Jr; 35 Cartier Rice DB - Fr; 36 Robbie McAtee DB - Sr; 40 Daryl Faulkner DB - So; 71 James Alexander DB - Jr; Long snappers: 58 Greg Curtin LS - Sr; 62 Clay Pear LS - So; 65 J.J. Helton LS - So; 74 Brad Hart LS - So; Punters: 9 Ryan Tydlacka K/P - So; 44 Tim Masthay P/K - Sr; Place kickers: 36 Lones Seiber K - Jr; 97 J.J. Housley K - Sr |

== Postseason awards ==
=== All-American ===
| Team | Player | Position |
|---|---|---|
| First Team | Tim Masthay | Punter |

=== All-SEC ===
| Team | Player | Position |
|---|---|---|
| First Team | Micah Johnson | Linebacker |
| First Team | Trevard Lindley | Defensive Back |
| First Team | Tim Masthay | Punter |
| Second Team | Garry Williams | Tackle |
| Second Team | Myron Pryor | Defensive tackle |
| Third Team | Jeremy Jarmon | Defensive end |

=== All-Freshman SEC ===
| Team | Player | Position |
|---|---|---|
| First Team | Randall Cobb | Quarterback/Wide Receiver/Punt Returner |

== Preseason awards ==
=== All-SEC ===
| Team | Player | Position |
|---|---|---|
| First Team | Trevard Lindley | Defensive Back |
| Second Team | Jeremy Jarmon | Defensive end |
| Second Team | Micah Johnson | Linebacker |
| Third Team | Dicky Lyons Jr. | Wide Receiver |
| Third Team | Garry Williams | Tackle |

== Class of 2009 commitments/signees ==
College recruiting
| Name | Hometown | School | Height | Weight | Commit date |
|---|---|---|---|---|---|
| Brian Adams; QB | Cumming, Georgia | South Forsyth | 6 ft 4 in (1.93 m) | 210 lb (95 kg) | Jun 22, 2008 |
| Brian Adams; QB | Recruit ratings: Scout: Rivals: (76) | | | | |
| Justin Aumiller; TE | Danville, Kentucky | Boyle County | 6 ft 4 in (1.93 m) | 199 lb (90 kg) | Jun 20, 2008 |
| Justin Aumiller; TE | Recruit ratings: Scout: Rivals: (40) | | | | |
| Justin Bean; WR | Tupelo, Mississippi | Tupelo | 6 ft 2 in (1.88 m) | 170 lb (77 kg) | Jul 1, 2008 |
| Justin Bean; WR | Recruit ratings: Scout: Rivals: (40) | | | | |
| Mister Cobble; DT | Louisville, Kentucky | Central | 6 ft 0 in (1.83 m) | 270 lb (120 kg) | Jun 22, 2008 |
| Mister Cobble; DT | Recruit ratings: Scout: Rivals: (69) | | | | |
| Mark Crawford; DT | Indianapolis, IN | Coffeyville CC | 6 ft 1 in (1.85 m) | 310 lb (140 kg) | Dec 27, 2008 |
| Mark Crawford; DT | Recruit ratings: Scout: Rivals: | | | | |
| DeQuin Evans; DE | Wilmington, CA | Harbor CC | 6 ft 2 in (1.88 m) | 275 lb (125 kg) | Feb 4, 2009 |
| DeQuin Evans; DE | Recruit ratings: Scout: Rivals: | | | | |
| Qua Huzzie; LB | LaGrange, Georgia | LaGrange | 5 ft 11 in (1.80 m) | 200 lb (91 kg) | Jul 21, 2008 |
| Qua Huzzie; LB | Recruit ratings: Scout: Rivals: (75) | | | | |
| Tristian Johnson; DE | LaGrange, Georgia | LaGrange | 6 ft 3 in (1.91 m) | 222 lb (101 kg) | Aug 4, 2008 |
| Tristian Johnson; DE | Recruit ratings: Scout: Rivals: (73) | | | | |
| Anthony Kendrick; TE | Katy, Texas | Seven Lakes | 6 ft 4 in (1.93 m) | 220 lb (100 kg) | Jul 3, 2008 |
| Anthony Kendrick; TE | Recruit ratings: Scout: Rivals: (77) | | | | |
| LaRod King; WR | Radcliff, Kentucky | North Hardin | 6 ft 6 in (1.98 m) | 190 lb (86 kg) | Apr 5, 2008 |
| LaRod King; WR | Recruit ratings: Scout: Rivals: (75) | | | | |
| Patrick Ligon; DE | Memphis, TN | Christian Brothers | 6 ft 5 in (1.96 m) | 255 lb (116 kg) | Jan 26, 2009 |
| Patrick Ligon; DE | Recruit ratings: Scout: Rivals: (40) | | | | |
| Chris Matthews; WR | Wilmington, CA | Harbor CC | 6 ft 5 in (1.96 m) | 210 lb (95 kg) | Dec 15, 2008 |
| Chris Matthews; WR | Recruit ratings: Scout: Rivals: | | | | |
| Demetri Merritt; OLB | LaGrange, Georgia | LaGrange | 6 ft 3 in (1.91 m) | 200 lb (91 kg) | Oct 28, 2008 |
| Demetri Merritt; OLB | Recruit ratings: Scout: Rivals: (74) | | | | |
| Kevin Mitchell; OT | Douglasville, Georgia | Alexander | 6 ft 7 in (2.01 m) | 270 lb (120 kg) | Jun 25, 2008 |
| Kevin Mitchell; OT | Recruit ratings: Scout: Rivals: (40) | | | | |
| Terrell Mitchell; TE | Powder Springs, Georgia | McEachern | 6 ft 6 in (1.98 m) | 220 lb (100 kg) | Jan 8, 2009 |
| Terrell Mitchell; TE | Recruit ratings: Scout: Rivals: (77) | | | | |
| Ryan Mosby; LB | Rockwall, Texas | Rockwall-Heath | 6 ft 0 in (1.83 m) | 200 lb (91 kg) | Jan 19, 2009 |
| Ryan Mosby; LB | Recruit ratings: Scout: Rivals: (73) | | | | |
| Ryan Mossakowski; QB | Frisco, Texas | Centennial | 6 ft 4 in (1.93 m) | 201 lb (91 kg) | Aug 8, 2008 |
| Ryan Mossakowski; QB | Recruit ratings: Scout: Rivals: (79) | | | | |
| Martavius Neloms; DB | Memphis, TN | Fairley | 6 ft 2 in (1.88 m) | 175 lb (79 kg) | Jan 25, 2009 |
| Martavius Neloms; DB | Recruit ratings: Scout: Rivals: (40) | | | | |
| Morgan Newton; QB | Carmel, Indiana | Carmel | 6 ft 4 in (1.93 m) | 205 lb (93 kg) | Aug 21, 2008 |
| Morgan Newton; QB | Recruit ratings: Scout: Rivals: (81) | | | | |
| Donte Rumph; DE | St. Matthews, South Carolina | Calhoun County | 5 ft 11 in (1.80 m) | 264 lb (120 kg) | Aug 25, 2008 |
| Donte Rumph; DE | Recruit ratings: Scout: Rivals: (78) | | | | |
| Donald Russell; RB | Palm Beach Gardens, Florida | Dwyer | 5 ft 11 in (1.80 m) | 205 lb (93 kg) | Jan 22, 2009 |
| Donald Russell; RB | Recruit ratings: Scout: Rivals: (78) | | | | |
| Sam Simpson; C | Lexington, Kentucky | Henry Clay | 6 ft 4 in (1.93 m) | 295 lb (134 kg) | Aug 12, 2008 |
| Sam Simpson; C | Recruit ratings: Scout: Rivals: (76) | | | | |
| Dakotah Tyler; RB | Indianapolis, Indiana | Pike | 6 ft 0 in (1.83 m) | 200 lb (91 kg) | Dec 11, 2008 |
| Dakotah Tyler; RB | Recruit ratings: Scout: Rivals: (77) | | | | |
| Jarvis Walker; S | Metairie, Louisiana | Rummel | 6 ft 2 in (1.88 m) | 202 lb (92 kg) | Jun 25, 2008 |
| Jarvis Walker; S | Recruit ratings: Scout: Rivals: (78) | | | | |
| Myron Walker; DT | Metairie, Louisiana | Rummel | 6 ft 0 in (1.83 m) | 275 lb (125 kg) | Jun 25, 2008 |
| Myron Walker; DT | Recruit ratings: Scout: Rivals: (79) | | | | |
| Larry Warford; OG | Richmond, Kentucky | Madison Central | 6 ft 4 in (1.93 m) | 279 lb (127 kg) | Mar 24, 2008 |
| Larry Warford; OG | Recruit ratings: Scout: Rivals: (77) | | | | |
| Ridge Wilson; LB | Louisville, Kentucky | Central | 6 ft 3 in (1.91 m) | 207 lb (94 kg) | Sep 1, 2008 |
| Ridge Wilson; LB | Recruit ratings: Scout: Rivals: (40) | | | | |
Overall recruit ranking: Scout: 26 Rivals: 42
Note: In many cases, Scout, Rivals, 247Sports, On3, and ESPN may conflict in their listings of height and weight.; In these cases, the average was taken. ESPN grades are on a 100-point scale.; Sources: "Kentucky 2009 Football Commitments". Rivals.; "2009 Kentucky Football Commits". Scout.; "ESPN". ESPN.; "Scout.com Team Recruiting Rankings". Scout.; "2009 Team Ranking". Rivals.com.
