= List of killings by law enforcement officers in the United States, December 2012 =

This is a list of people reported killed by non-military law enforcement officers in the United States in December 2012, whether in the line of duty or not, and regardless of reason or method. The listing documents the occurrence of a death, making no implications regarding wrongdoing or justification on the part of the person killed or officer involved. Killings are arranged by date of the incident that caused death. Different death dates, if known, are noted in the description. The table below lists 48 people.

== December 2012 ==
Date	Name (Age) of Deceased	State (City)	Description
2012-12-31	Gregory Shafer (55)	Oregon (Hermiston)	Officers responded to a report that the suspect of an armed bank robbery had entered a store near the bank. When the suspect pointed what looked like a handgun at the officers, they opened fire, killing the suspect.
2012-12-30	Dusty Clark (28)	New York (Altona)	
2012-12-30	Tederalle Satchell (28)	Texas (Hearne)	Officers responded to a report of a large group of people in an apartment complex parking lot and shots being fired from a white vehicle carrying three people. Police found a vehicle matching the description. Details have not been released of what led to a subsequent officer-involved fatal shooting.
2012-12-30	Yemal Yazar (43)	Texas (Houston)	Yazar's wife called paramedics because he was acting irrationally. The paramedics called the sheriff's department when Yazar confronted them violently. Officers used a Taser on Yazar, then fatally shot him. One officer was treated for a concussion, cuts and a bite.
2012-12-29	Detandel Devon Pickets (25)	Louisiana (Monroe)	
2012-12-29	Todd Shultz	Pennsylvania (Springettsbury Township)	A man with a table knife and pair scissors in his hand was shot 17 times by multiple officers when he tried to enter a Kmart store. The shooting was ruled justified by the DA. The family of Shultz filed a lawsuit against the department in 2015.
2012-12-28	Tiffany Lee Overholser (45)	West Virginia (Martinsburg)	Dispatch informed police a woman was holding another woman at gunpoint. When officers arrived, Overholser exited the home and brandished a handgun at them. When she took steps toward police, she was shot and killed. Officers later determined Overholser was suicidal and had made the false police report.
2012-12-28	Lamon Khiry Haslip (18)	California (Moreno Valley)	
2012-12-28	Eddie Jones III (39)	New Jersey (Gloucester Township)	
2012-12-27	Anthony Banta, Jr (22)	California (Walnut Creek)	Police responded to a call during which a woman could be heard screaming. Officers report they were forced to shoot an armed man who was pronounced dead at the scene.
2012-12-27	unnamed man	Tennessee (Memphis)	Officers responded to a report of armed burglary in progress at a restaurant. When officers arrived at least two suspects fled into nearby woods. One suspect was arrested, the other was fatally shot.
2012-12-25	unnamed man	Colorado (Pueblo)	Officers responded to a report of a domestic disturbance. As the officers arrived, the suspect fired at police with a handgun, then fled through the rear of the house. Officers in the alley confronted the suspect and fatally shot him.
2012-12-23	Rodney Moore (35)	Texas (Tahoka)	An officer responded to a call from Moore's wife that Moore was hearing voices and afraid someone was going to hurt him. The first officer to arrive called for backup to use a Taser on Moore so he would drop the knife he was holding. When the second officer arrived, Moore turned toward that officer and was shot twice in the chest. The officer claims Moore advanced towards him. Moore's wife claims Moore held the knife pointing down and merely turned toward the officer.
2012-12-21	Sammie Junebug Davis (49)	Georgia (Macon)	Macon police officer Clayton Sutton responded to a supermarket shopping center in reference to a subject that was refusing to leave. Upon arrival Sutton met with Sammie "Junebug" Davis, and shortly thereafter Davis began to struggle with Sutton. Davis allegedly attempted to cut Sutton with an unknown object, which he threw when Sutton fatally shot him in self-defense.
2012-12-21	Nicholas Titus (21)	Colorado (Security-Widefield)	Officers began following a suspect with multiple felony warrants. The officers called for backup and attempted to contain the suspect when he parked at a store. The suspect then rammed police vehicles and was subsequently fatally shot.
2012-12-20	Anthony A Hammond (41)	Maryland (Elkton)	An officer spotted Hammond, who was wanted on multiple warrants, in a vehicle. The officer followed him until he parked and fled on foot. As the officer gave chase Hammond kicked in the door to a home then attempted to disarm the officer who fatally shot him.
2012-12-19	John Austgen (47)	Florida (Fort Pierce)	
2012-12-19	unnamed man	Virginia (Dumfries)	Officers investigating an armed burglary from two hours earlier found a vehicle involved in the burglary. The driver was arrested but the passenger fled on foot. He was found nearby in a wooded area. The suspect advanced on officers while armed with a handgun. He was fatally shot after ignoring the officers' commands.
2012-12-18	Alan Alvarez, Jr. (30)	California (Fresno)	Fresno Police officers shot and killed Alan Alvarez, Jr. on Tuesday, December 18, about 3:30 PM, near Cedar and Dakota. Alvarez had been wanted in connection with a November 10 shooting. Officers said he attempted to pull a gun and shoot them. Four officers fired their weapons. Alvarez died at the scene.
2012-12-17	unnamed man	Ohio (Columbus)	Officers responded to a report of a man holding a gun to the caller's face. Officers observed that situation through a window, entered the home and fatally shot the gunman when he refused to drop his weapon.
2012-12-17	Derek Mack (18)	New Jersey (Atlantic City)	Mack was shot by Atlantic City Police Officer John L. Smith after he turned toward the officer while armed with a handgun.
2012-12-16	Jesus Manuel Garcia (19)	Texas (San Antonio)	Garcia fired shots in China Garden restaurant, then shot a windshield of a police patrol car, then entered a nearby theater. Off-duty sergeant from Bexar County Sherriff's office was working security. She spotted Garcia leaving theater restroom with his gun drawn. Sgt. Castellano shot Garcia multiple times, killing him.
2012-12-16	Danny Meredith	Florida (Clearwater)	
2012-12-15	Jason Letts (38)	Alabama (Birmingham)	Officers responded to a report of an armed man inside a hospital. When the officers encountered the man, he shot at them. They returned fire, killing him.
2012-12-15	Jamaal Moore (23)	Illinois (Chicago)	Officers pursued a vehicle believed to be occupied by persons involved in a recent armed robbery. When the vehicle crashed, Moore and other suspects fled on foot. Moore was struck by a pursuing squad car. Moore was fatally shot by one officer after twice throwing another officer to the ground.
2012-12-15	Romero Roberto Moya (33)	Alabama (Coldwater)	Officers were pursuing Moya as the prime suspect for three murders in a home. Moya fled in a vehicle, which crashed. He shot one officer with an assault rifle then commandeered another car and fled. When that vehicle crashed, officers fatally shot Moya as he exited the vehicle and reached for the rifle.
2012-12-15	Troy Gordon (31)	Florida (Palm Coast)	
2012-12-15	Thomas Kollman (48)	Florida (Fort Myers)	
2012-12-14	unnamed man (30)	Texas (Fort Hood)	Officers responded to a report of a suspicious vehicle parked at a lake. As they approached at least one gunshot was fired from inside the vehicle. The officers returned fire, fatally wounding the occupant who was a soldier at Fort Hood.
2012-12-13	Devni Jolicoeur (17)	Florida (West Palm Beach)	
2012-12-11	Leslie Cowan	Florida (Jacksonville)	Cowan pointed a handgun in the parking lot of an Academy Sports following an incident where he and friends went in and wouldn't put down loaded weapons. Officer Bradley Hudson then shot Cowan, killing him.
2012-12-11	Darnesha Harris (17)	Louisiana (Breaux Bridge)	Officers responded to a disturbance Landry street when a 2005 Toyota Corolla driven by Harris struck the front of a police car. She backed up and hit a parked car on the road before driving forward through a ditch, striking a bystander and a different car. A Breaux Bridge police officer subsequently shot and killed Harris.
2012-12-10	Daniel Christopher Scott (56)	Texas (Corpus Christi)	Officers responded to a call by Scott, saying he had armed and barricaded himself in his home because he felt threatened by his neighbors. A 5-hour standoff ensued as negotiators attempted to persuade Scott to disarm. When he shot at officers, they returned fire, killing him. Police and neighbors described Scott as mentally ill.
2012-12-08	Bartholomew Williams (38)	California (San Bernardino)	Officers responded to a report from dorm staff that a dorm tenant was acting irrationally. The officers determined that Williams was a threat to himself and others and attempted to arrest him. Williams resisted, using the officers' pepper spray on them, taking a baton from one and wrestled one to the ground and began kicking him in the head and torso. Two other officers then fatally shot Williams.
2012-12-07	unnamed man	Kentucky (Magnolia)	An officer attempted to stop a vehicle for reckless driving. The driver fled in the vehicle, spun out of control and came to a stop. As an officer approached the vehicle, the driver accelerated towards the officer who fired several shots into the car. The driver died at a local hospital.
2012-12-06	Jalen Ricks (19)	Georgia (Jonesboro)	Officers responded to a report of a man with a gun. When the officers arrived at the scene, Ricks opened fire, wounding one officer. Officers returned fire, killing Ricks.
2012-12-06	Robert Williams (37)	Texas (Dallas)	Officers responded to reports of man walking down street with shotgun in hand. When officers commanded Williams to drop the weapon he walked toward them and raised the gun. The officers shot Williams, who died at a local hospital.
2012-12-06	Shelly Frey (27)	Texas (Houston)	A policeman shot and killed Frey, whom he suspected of shoplifting from a Walmart store, where he was working part-time as a security guard. The deceased along with her accomplices, two adults and two children, refused to stop when ordered, one adult hit the police officer with her purse to facilitate escape in their automobile. The policeman shot at the vehicle, hitting Frey in the neck, Frey who was a passenger in the automobile, died before she could be attended by medical personnel.
2012-12-06	unnamed man	California (Hollywood)	Officers responding to a report of domestic violence came into contact with a man and fatally shot him.
2012-12-04	Desirae Daniel	Iowa (Cedar Rapids)	Officers followed a car down several streets after it failed to stop. As the officers approached the vehicle, Daniel displayed a handgun. The officers fatally shot her.
2012-12-04	Lindal M Johnson (55)	Indiana (Evansville)	Officers arrived at Johnson's home to investigate a criminal mischief report. During the visit, officers attempted to subdue Johnson with a stun gun. After Johnson threw a hatchet at the officers, they opened fire, killing him.
2012-12-04	Jose Antonio Hernandez-Gonzalez (20)	Georgia (Buford)	Officers responded to a report of drug use in an apartment complex parking lot. One of the suspects pulled a handgun and held it to his own head. When he refused to drop the weapon, a stun gun was used on him. He removed the probes and pointed the gun at the officers. Three officers fired on the suspect, killing him.
2012-12-04	unnamed man	West Virginia (Elkins)	Officers responded to a report of a shooting. The victim was taken to a hospital and a standoff ensued between the shooting suspect and police. The suspect came out of the house with a weapon. Officers report the suspect posed a threat and was fatally shot.
2012-12-04	Mary Loflin (62)	Florida (Youngstown)	
2012-12-03	unnamed man	Oklahoma (Midwest City)	Officers responded to reports of an explosion in a woman's detached garage and a man in her yard who was an acquaintance of her husband. Officers arrived to find a shirtless man holding a machete and a rifle who "acted crazy." When the man pointed the rifle at officers, they fatally shot him.
2012-12-03	Eric Dilworth (38)	Idaho (Meridian)	Dilworth's brother called police when he believed his brother to be suicidal. When officers arrived, Dilworth allegedly ran out the back door with a knife. Four officers fired multiple shots at Dilworth, killing him, after he allegedly refused to drop the knife and continued towards them.
2012-12-02	unnamed man	Arizona (Sasabe)	A Border Patrol agent encountered a group of people who had illegally crossed the border. A physical altercation occurred and the agent fatally shot one of the group.
2012-12-01	unnamed man (39)	Ohio (Brunswick)	Officers responded to a report that a man was going to a home to hurt his ex-girlfriend. Police and SWAT surrounded the home and a 30-hour standoff ensued. A coroner reported that the man died from multiple gunshot wounds after being shot by police.

== See also ==
- Death in custody § United States
- Henry A. Wallace Police Crime Public Database
- List of cases of police brutality
- List of countries with annual rates and counts for killings by law enforcement officers
- List of law enforcement officers killed in the line of duty in the United States
- List of law enforcement officers convicted for an on-duty killing in the United States
- List of shootings by US immigration agents
- List of police reforms related to the George Floyd protests
- List of unarmed African Americans killed by law enforcement officers in the United States
- Lists of killings by law enforcement officers
- Police brutality in the United States
- Police misconduct § United States
- Police riot § United States
- Police use of deadly force in the United States
