= 2009 Liberty Bowl =

2009 AutoZone Liberty Bowl
- 50th Liberty Bowl
- Liberty Bowl 50th Anniversary logo.
Kentucky Wildcats	East Carolina Pirates
(6–6)	(9–4)
SEC	C-USA
25	19
Head coach: Rich Brooks	Head coach: Skip Holtz
	1	2	3	4	Total
Kentucky	0	3	13	9	25
East Carolina	3	13	3	0	19
- Date: January 2, 2009
- Season: 2008
- Stadium: Liberty Bowl Memorial Stadium
- Location: Memphis, Tennessee
- MVP: DT Ventrell Jenkins, Kentucky
- Referee: Bill LeMonnier (Big Ten Conference)
- Attendance: 56,125
- Payout: US$1.8 million per team

United States TV coverage
- Network: ESPN
- Announcers: Mark Jones, Bob Davie
- Nielsen ratings: 2.3

The 2009 Liberty Bowl was a college football postseason bowl game played at Liberty Bowl Memorial Stadium in Memphis, Tennessee, on January 2, 2009. The 50th edition of the Liberty Bowl, it was the first edition ever played in January. With sponsorship from AutoZone, the game was officially the AutoZone Liberty Bowl. The game featured the East Carolina Pirates of Conference USA (C-USA) and the Kentucky Wildcats of the Southeastern Conference (SEC). Kentucky overcame a 13-point halftime deficit to win, 25–19.

== Background ==
East Carolina accepted an invitation to the bowl after their victory over the Tulsa Golden Hurricane in the 2008 C-USA Championship Game. East Carolina entered the game with a record of 9-4 and had been ranked as high as No. 15 in the AP Poll during the season. Kentucky was 6–6 and unranked.

== Game summary ==
East Carolina led through much of the game. However, late in the fourth quarter, Kentucky defensive tackle Ventrell Jenkins picked up a fumble and returned it 56 yards for the game-winning touchdown. Jenkins was named the MVP of the game. The fumble recovery and return, marked by a vicious stiff arm Jenkins put on the opposing quarterback, received generous replay during bowl game broadcasts.

=== Scoring summary ===
Scoring Play	Score
1st Quarter
ECU - Ben Hartman 22-yard FG, 5:25	ECU 3-0
2nd Quarter
ECU - Brandon Simmons 28-yard TD run (Hartman kick), 14:14	ECU 10-0
UK - Lones Seiber 21-yard FG, 8:59	ECU 10-3
ECU - Darryl Freeney 80-yard TD pass from Patrick Pinkney (kick blocked), 8:47	ECU 16-3
3rd Quarter
UK - David Jones 99-yard kickoff return (kick blocked), 14:48	ECU 16-9
UK - Kyrus Lanxster 19-yard TD pass from Mike Hartline (Seiber kick), 8:13	Tie 16-16
ECU - Hartman 43-yard FG, :06	ECU 19-16
4th Quarter
UK - Seiber 34-yard FG, 14:07	Tie 19-19
UK - Ventrell Jenkins 56-yard fumble return (kick blocked), 3:02	UK 25-19
