= Doc Edwards =

American baseball player, coach, and manager (1936–2018)

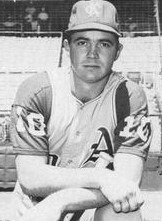
- Catcher / Coach / Manager
- Born: December 10, 1936; Red Jacket, West Virginia, U.S.
- Died: August 20, 2018 (aged 81); San Angelo, Texas, U.S.
- Batted: Right Threw: Right

MLB debut
- April 21, 1962, for the Cleveland Indians

Last MLB appearance
- August 29, 1970, for the Philadelphia Phillies

MLB statistics
- Batting average: .238
- Home runs: 15
- Runs batted in: 87
- Managerial record: 173–207
- Winning %: .455
- Stats at Baseball Reference

Teams
- As player: Cleveland Indians (1962–1963); Kansas City Athletics (1963–1965); New York Yankees (1965); Philadelphia Phillies (1970); As manager: Cleveland Indians (1987–1989); As coach: Philadelphia Phillies (1970–1972); Cleveland Indians (1985–1987); New York Mets (1990–1991)

Howard Rodney "Doc" Edwards (December 10, 1936 – August 20, 2018) was an American professional baseball catcher, manager, coach, and scout who played in Major League Baseball (MLB) with the Cleveland Indians, Kansas City Athletics, New York Yankees, and Philadelphia Phillies, over parts of five seasons, spanning nine years. Edwards also managed the Indians, for parts of three seasons (1987 to 1989). He played in Minor League Baseball (MiLB) and was an MiLB and independent league manager for over 30 years. Edwards was named Manager of the Year in at least six different leagues. Edwards was the Rochester Red Wings manager in 1981 when they played in the longest game in professional baseball history in the United States and Canada. Overall, he spent 57 years in professional baseball.

== Early life ==
Edwards was born on December 10, 1936, in Red Jacket, West Virginia, a coal mining town near the Kentucky border. His father worked in coal mines. He was raised in Varney and/or Pigeon Creek, West Virginia. He played high school baseball in West Virginia, as a catcher. The Pittsburgh Pirates scouted Edwards, but he was 5 ft 10 in (1.78 m) 155 lb (70.3 kg) in high school, and the Pirates decided he was too small to recruit.

After high school, Edwards entered the United States Navy for two years, where he served as a medic/Navy Corpsman in the U. S. Navy Medical Corps. Edwards received the nickname “Doc” during his service. He was stationed at Camp Pendleton, with the 5th U.S. Marines in California. Edwards stated that Marines refer to their medics as "Doc" rather than medic, when calling for aid. Edwards played football for the Camp Pendleton base team. He was discharged in 1957. The 19-year old Edwards came out of the Navy at 6 ft 2 in (1.88 m) 245 lb (111.1 kg)

After his discharge, Edwards resided in Carlsbad, California. He received a football scholarship to MiraCosta Junior College (now MiraCosta College). He played "town baseball", and played winter league baseball for Ryan Aeronautics. He is reported to have played baseball at MiraCosta in 1959 under coach John Seeley, even though he originally came to the school to play football. Coach Seeley saw that Edwards played excellent defense, though slow as a runner; and was a student of baseball, with great charisma.

== Playing career ==
In 1958, Edwards had a tryout with the San Diego Padres of the Pacific Coast League, the Triple-A affiliate of the MLB Cleveland Indians. It is also reported that Edwards was given a tryout with the Padres in 1959, on the recommendation of an umpire who saw Edwards play at MiraCosta and asked Edwards if he would be interested in playing professional baseball. Future Baseball Hall of Famer Ralph Kiner was the Padres' general manager. Kiner signed Edwards to a $500 minor league contract with the Cleveland organization. Kiner required that Edwards lose substantial weight, and after six months of reducing his diet and running five miles a day on the beach, Edwards was down to 200 lb (90.7 kg).

=== Minor league playing career (1958 to 1961) ===
Edwards played his first four professional seasons solely in MiLB, as a catcher. In 1958, the Indians assigned him to their short season Class D affiliate in Nebraska, where he batted .359 in 42 games, and helped lead the North Platte Indians to the Nebraska State League pennant. Over the next three seasons, Edwards continued to produce as a hitter, progressing up the Indians farm system, batting .337, .279, and .331 for the Selma Cloverleafs (Class D/Alabama-Florida League), Alamance Indians (Class B/Carolina League), and the Salt Lake City Bees (Triple-A/Pacific Coast League) respectively, before earning his call up to the major league club in 1962. He had a .990 fielding percentage as a catcher for the Bees, and his .331 batting average was second in the Pacific Coast League in 1961.

=== Major league playing career (1962 to 1965) ===
Edwards' first MLB game came on April 12, 1962, against the New York Yankees and their future Hall of Fame pitcher Whitey Ford. In his first at bat, Edwards had a base on balls against Ford. Edwards started 34 games at catcher that season, appearing in 53 games. He hit .273 in 143 at bats, with three home runs and nine runs batted in (RBIs), and had a .992 fielding percentage. In late-May 1963, the Indians traded Edwards, along with a substantial sum of money (reported as $100,000), to the Kansas City Athletics for Dick Howser and catcher Joe Azcue. He had started 10 games, and batted .258 in 31 at bats without a home run or RBI before being traded. In 1963 with the A's, he started 58 games (the most of any catcher on the team), batting .250, with six home runs and 35 RBIs in 240 at bats.

He spent the full 1964 season with Kansas City, starting 78 games; again more than any catcher on the team. He hit .224, with five home runs, and 28 RBIs in 294 at bats. In early May 1965, the A's traded Edwards to the Yankees for pitcher Rollie Sheldon and catcher John Blanchard (who cried at his locker on learning of the trade). The Yankees' twelve-time All-Star catcher Elston Howard had hurt his elbow in early April that season. Howard eventually needed surgery to address a bone chip in his elbow a month later and was going to be out for at least two months. The Yankees believed they needed a new catcher until Howard's return. This was the 19th trade between the Yankees and A's since 1955.

Before the May 1965 trade, Edwards started six games and was hitting .150 in 20 at bats for the A's. He started 32 of the 43 games in which he appeared for the Yankees, catching 284 innings. Jake Gibbs and Bob Schmidt also started 26 games between them at catcher that season for the Yankees. After his return, Howard started the majority of the Yankees' 1965 season, and made the All-Star team again. Edwards hit only .190 for the Yankees, in 100 at bats with one home run and nine RBIs.

=== Minor leagues (1965 to 1969) ===
In early August 1965, the Yankees assigned Edwards to their Triple-A affiliate, the Toledo Mud Hens of the International League. He started 14 games with Toledo, batting .317 in 63 at bats. In January 1966, the Yankees traded Edwards to Cleveland for Lou Clinton. Going into Cleveland's 1966 training camp, Edwards was listed on the Portland Beavers' roster, Cleveland's Triple-A affiliate in the Pacific Coach League.

Cuban born Joe Azcue (for whom Edwards had been traded in 1963) was considered Cleveland's No. 1 catcher going into the 1966 season. Before the season, Cleveland had acquired 36-year old veteran catcher Del Crandall from the Pittsburgh Pirates to serve as Azcue's backup. Entering his 16th (and final) MLB season, Crandall had been an All-Star in eight different seasons and started in two World Series. In training camp, Edwards was competing for third string catcher with Duke Sims, whom Cleveland manager Birdie Tebbetts (himself a former MLB catcher) considered the most improved player in training camp. Sims' power hitting was superior to Edwards, and gave him an advantage over Edwards.

Edwards played the entire 1966 season with Portland. When Crandall was injured in June, Cleveland called up Beavers' catcher Buddy Booker, rather than Edwards. Edwards played over 100 games at catcher for the Beavers, batting .261, with four home runs and 38 RBIs in 376 at bats. In January 1967, he was involved in a five-player trade in which Cleveland sent Jim Landis, Edwards, and Jim Weaver to the Houston Astros for Lee Maye and Ken Retzer. Edwards played the entire season with the Astros' affiliate in the Pacific Coast League, the Oklahoma City 89ers. He had a .218 batting average in 95 games.

In late November 1967, the Philadelphia Phillies selected Edwards from the 89ers in the Triple-A draft. He played two more seasons in the Pacific Coast League with Phillies' Triple-A affiliates, the San Diego Padres (1968) and the Eugene Emeralds (1969). He hit .259 in 83 games at San Diego and .266 in 73 games with Eugene. These were his final years in MiLB as a player. Edwards realized he was not going to be playing in the major leagues again when no team selected him in the 1968 expansion draft.

=== Philadelphia Phillies (1970) ===
The Phillies named the 33-year old Edwards as their bullpen coach for the 1970 season, serving as part of manager Frank Lucchesi's coaching staff; Edward's playing career apparently over. On May 2, 1970, in a game against the San Francisco Giants, Phillies' catchers Tim McCarver and then Mike Ryan suffered broken hands in the same inning. The Phillies called up catcher Mike Compton from Eugene, but then he suffered a back injury a month later; and another Eugene call-up, Del Bates, suffered a hand injury, and eventually was sent back to Eugene.

The Phillies activated Edwards from coach to player on June 6, to fill in as a catcher during this injury crisis. In his first game back, on June 6 against the Astros, Edwards had three hits in five at bats, with one run scored and one RBI. In his third game, on June 9 against the Atlanta Braves, he had two hits in three at bats, and caught a Jim Bunning–Dick Selma two-hitter. Edwards's two RBIs in the second inning were decisive in the Phillies 2–1 victory; and he picked off Braves' runner Sonny Jackson at first base in the ninth inning in helping to secure the victory. In Edward's unlikely return for his final MLB season, he played catcher in 34 games, starting 23, and batted .269.

== Coaching, managing and scouting career ==
Edwards returned as the Phillies bullpen coach in 1971 and 1972. Danny Ozark replaced Lucchesi as Phillies' manager after the 1972 season ended, and Ozark replaced Edwards with Carroll Berringer in November 1972.

Overall during his managerial career, Edwards had a 173–207 record as a manager with the Cleveland Indians (1987 to 1989), won over 1,000 games as an MiLB manager, and had an over .500 winning percentage as an independent league manager for 15 seasons. During his early years as a minor league manager, he was ejected from 13 games, including three consecutive games at one point; but after three years as a manager, Edwards realized he needed to control this behavior to be a proper manager.

=== Minor league manager (1973 to 1985) ===
In 1973, the 36-year-old Edwards was named manager of the West Haven Yankees, the New York Yankees' affiliate in the Double-A Eastern League, beginning a 40-year journey that would see Edwards manage over 3,800 games in 33 seasons for 12 teams. West Haven had a 72–66 record in 1973, finishing in second place. Edwards was named the Eastern League's Manager of the Year. He managed West Haven the following season (1974).

Edwards was next hired in 1975 by the Chicago Cubs, who assigned him to manage their Double-A affiliate in Midland, Texas in the Texas League. Under Edwards, the Midland Cubs won the Texas League pennant in 1975, and Edwards was selected Manager of the Year. The Cubs promoted Edwards to manage the Triple-A Wichita Aeros of the American Association in 1976. Witchita was 56–70 that season under Edwards.

In 1977, he coached winter baseball in Venezuela. Later that year, Edwards was hired to manage the Montreal Expos’ Double-A affiliate in the Eastern League, the Quebec Metros, who had a 65–70 record under Edwards. He was managing Caguas of the Puerto Rican Winter League in November 1977, when he was hired by the Triple-A Denver Bears of the American Association to manage the team in the 1978 season. From 1979 to 1981 he managed the Rochester Red Wings, the Baltimore Orioles' affiliate in the Triple-A International League. The Red Wings were 53–86 in 1979, but improved to 74–65 in 1980. In 1980, the team reached the playoffs for the first time in four years. The 1981 Red Wings went 69–70.

In April 1981, Edwards managed in one of the most memorable games in baseball history, which among other things has been the subject of an ESPN 30 for 30 documentary. Beginning on the evening of April 18, 1981 at 8:02 p.m., the Red Wings and Pawtucket Red Sox played in a 33-inning marathon, which remains the longest game in professional baseball history. The game took over eight hours to play in total. Play was suspended the following morning (Easter Day) a little after 4:00 a.m., after 32 innings, with the score tied, 2–2. The game was continued on June 23, with the Red Sox winning in the 33rd inning. The teams' third basemen were future Hall of Fame players Wade Boggs (Pawtucket) and Cal Ripken Jr. (Rochester).

At the end of the 1981 season, Carl Steinfeldt, general manager of the Charleston (West Virginia) Charlies of the International League sought permission from Orioles' farm system director Tom Giordano to discuss hiring Edwards as the Charlies' manager in 1982; and within days Edwards became the Charlies new manager. He replaced interim manager Frank Lucchesi. The Charlies were the International League affiliate of the Cleveland Indians. The team was located in the state capital of Charleston, West Virginia, only two hours from his mother's home in Matewan, West Virginia, which was a factor in Edwards' deciding to join the Charlies. He managed the Charlies in 1982, to a 59–81 record, and in 1983, to a 74–66 record. He was the International League's Manager of the Year in 1983.

The Charlies were in financial difficulty when Edwards joined the team in 1981. The franchise moved to Maine after the 1983 season, becoming the Maine Guides. Edwards continued to manage the team in Maine, for two more years. The Guides were Cleveland's affiliate in the International League. The team was 77–59 in 1984, swept their semifinal playoff series, and lost the Governor's Cup finals, three games to two. The Guides were 76–63 the following season (1985), finishing in second place.

=== Cleveland Indians (1986 to 1989) ===
In 1986, Edwards was promoted to bullpen coach of the Cleveland Indians. Cleveland finished 84–78 under manager Pat Corrales. It was only the team's sixth winning season over the preceding 30 years, and their best record in 18 years. In 1987, Cleveland was 31–56 on July 16 when Corrales was fired. Edwards was promoted from bullpen coach to manager, and had a 30–45 record over the remainder of the season. Despite Cleveland's having the American League's worst record (61–101, .377) and Edward's 30–45 record (.400), Edwards still received a third-place vote for the American League Manager of the Year Award. In his only full season managing in Cleveland (1988), the team had a 17-game improvement over the previous season, finishing the season 78–84. They were sixth in the American League East Division, with all five teams ahead of them having records over .500.

Edwards began the 1989 season as Cleveland's manager. On August 4, the team was in second place with a 54–54 record, 1 1/2 games out of first place. By September 10 they were 65–78, in sixth place and 14 1/2 games out of first place, after losing 24 of their next 35 games. Edwards was relieved of his duties on September 12, with 19 games remaining in the 1989 season. He was replaced by special assignment scout John Hart as interim manager; who had managed nearly 800 minor league games earlier in his career. Edwards was considered an even-keeled "players manager" who did not berate his players or give motivational speeches, and was generally well-liked and respected; but team president Hank Peters believed the team had become too complacent about losing.

=== New York Mets and Arizona Diamondbacks ===
Edwards was associated with two more MLB teams over the remainder of his career. He worked as a bench coach for the New York Mets (1990 to 1991), after being offered the position by Mets' manager Davey Johnson. He was retained under subsequent Mets' manager Bud Harrelson, but with some issues arising among the players, Edwards, and Harrelson as to the degree of control Edwards had over players. In March 1996, Edwards was hired as a scout for the expansion Arizona Diamondbacks, working on the 1997 draft. He was part of a Diamondbacks core group including, among others, manager Buck Showalter, general manager Joe Garagiola Jr., and fellow scouts Ron Hassey, Ted Uhlaender, Ed Durkin, and Sandy Johnson, who played important roles in assembling the original Diamonbacks' team for its inaugural season in 1998. In 2001, the Diamonbacks won the World Series in only their fourth year of existence, the fastest expansion team to win a World Series.

=== Minor league and independent league manager (1992 to 2012) ===
The Pittsburgh Pirates originally hired Edwards as a hitting instructor for the Buffalo Bisons in 1992, and later named him manager. The Bisons were the Pirates' Triple-A affiliate in the American Association. In December 1992, Edwards suffered a heart attack and had quadruple bypass surgery. He was still able to manage the Bison in 1993, and had a 71–73 record. In 1994, he managed the Bisons to a 55–89 record. He was fired after the end of the season. Edwards later considered the time in Buffalo as manager wasted because he was focused on regaining his health, and lacked the energy to give the team what it needed from a manager.

Edwards' final 15 (or 16) seasons as a manager were spent in independent leagues. In 1995, Edwards managed the Albany-Colonie Diamond Dogs of the new independent Northeast League; with a record of 52–18. The new league was a blend of rookie league and Class A level players, and the teams were not affiliated with MLB franchises. Edwards was selected Manager of the Year. In February 1996, he was hired by the Evansville Otters of the independent Frontier League. He reportedly had a record of 34–40 managing the team in 1996. It was contemporaneously reported, however, that while Edwards was hired to manage the Otters, he left the team in March 1996 to serve as a scout for the expansion Arizona Diamondbacks (as permitted under his contract with the Otters), and it was Fernando Arroyo who managed the Otters to a 34–40 record in 1996.

In 1998, Edwards managed the independent Atlantic City Surf to a 60–40 regular season record and playoff championship during the inaugural season of the Atlantic League of Professional Baseball in 1998. The Surf were 61–58 the following season (1999) under Edwards. Edwards managed the Sioux Falls Canaries in the independent Northern League Central from 2000 to 2004; winning the South Division title in 2001 and reaching the playoffs for the first time in team history. He was named Manager of the Year in 2001. He was the manager for the San Angelo Colts, a team in the independent United League Baseball and later North American Baseball League, from 2006 through 2012, and was Manager of the Year in 2009.

=== Major league managerial record ===
Team	Year	Regular season					Postseason			
Team	Year	Games	Won	Lost	Win %	Finish	Won	Lost	Win %	Result
CLE	1987	75	30	45	.400	Interim	–	–	–	
CLE	1988	162	78	84	.481	6th in AL East	–	–	–	
CLE	1989	143	65	78	.455	Fired	–	–	–	
Total		370	173	207	.455		0	0	–	

== Legacy and honors ==
Edwards spent 57 years in professional baseball. He was a Manager of the Year numerous times: Eastern League (1973), Texas League (1975), International League (1983), Northeast League (1995), Northern League Central, and United League Baseball (September 2, 2009).

At the 2006 National Baseball Hall of Fame induction ceremony, new inductee Bruce Sutter thanked Edwards for his help in developing Sutter's signature split-finger fastball while managing Sutter with the Midland Cubs of the Texas League in 1975.

Edwards said the most difficult aspect of being a minor league manager was telling players who had always been successful, and hoped to play in the major leagues, that they would not be moving up. He stated "It's such a difficult time. Some players find out for the first time in their lives that they aren't good enough. After being the best since they were playing in kid leagues, they suddenly aren't good enough. There's not much worse than seeing a player who wants to make it so badly fall short because of the limitations of his talent". He also observed the same could be true of managers who want to go from the minor to the major leagues.

== Personal life and death ==
After his discharge from the Navy in 1957, Edwards lived in Carlsbad, California for the next 14 years. During his baseball playing career, Edwards began attending college in California, as a pre-medical student. In addition to playing baseball, he was married with three children and realized it was impractical to pursue medicine as a career; and switched his major to recreation, while attending San Diego State University.

Edwards died on August 20, 2018, in San Angelo, Texas, at the age of 81.
