= 2008 East Carolina Pirates football team =

American college football season

2008 East Carolina Pirates football

C-USA champion C-USA East Division champion

C-USA Championship Game, W 27–24 vs. Tulsa

Liberty Bowl, L 19–25 vs. Kentucky
- Conference: Conference USA
- East
- Record: 9–5 (6–2 C-USA)
- Head coach: Skip Holtz (4th season)
- Co-offensive coordinators: Steve Shankweiler (4th season); Todd Fitch (2nd season)
- Offensive scheme: Multiple
- Defensive coordinator: Greg Hudson (4th season)
- Base defense: 4–3
- Home stadium: Dowdy–Ficklen Stadium

2008 Conference USA football standings
	Conf.			Overall
Team	W		L	W		L
East Division
East Carolina x$	6	–	2	9	–	5
Memphis	4	–	4	6	–	7
Southern Miss	4	–	4	7	–	6
UAB	3	–	5	4	–	8
UCF	3	–	5	4	–	8
Marshall	3	–	5	4	–	8
West Division
Tulsa xy	7	–	1	11	–	3
Rice x	7	–	1	10	–	3
Houston	6	–	2	8	–	5
UTEP	4	–	4	5	–	7
Tulane	1	–	7	2	–	10
SMU	0	–	8	1	–	11
Championship: East Carolina 27, Tulsa 24
$ – Conference champion; x – Division champion/co-champions; y – Championship game participant; Rankings from AP Poll

The 2008 East Carolina Pirates football team represented East Carolina University in the 2008 NCAA Division I FBS football season. and plays their home games in Dowdy–Ficklen Stadium. The team was coached by Skip Holtz, who was in his fifth year with the program.

The Pirates have a local television contract with WITN-TV, an NBC affiliate located in Washington, North Carolina who elects to pick up games that are not picked up by national or regional networks, and all games are broadcast over the radio on the Pirate-ISP Sports Network. The flagship radio stations of the Pirates are Pirate Radio 1250 and 930 AM and Oldies 107.9 WNCT, both located in Greenville, North Carolina. The games are called by the "Voice of the Pirates", Jeff Charles.

== Before the season ==
The annual Purple-Gold Spring Game was held on April 12, 2008 during the Pigskin Pigout weekend activities in downtown Greenville, North Carolina. The "Pirates" team defeated the "East Carolina" team 13-3 as the game was called off due to inclement weather.

=== Recruiting ===
College recruiting (2008)
Name	Hometown	School	Height	Weight	40^{‡}	Commit date
Dayon Arrington; WR	Chatham, Virginia	Hargrave Military Academy	6 ft 3 in (1.91 m)	205 lb (93 kg)	4.5	Feb 6, 2008
Dayon Arrington; WR	Recruit ratings: Scout: Rivals: (67)					
C.J. Brown; OT	Wilmington, North Carolina	New Hanover HS	6 ft 4 in (1.93 m)	315 lb (143 kg)	-	Feb 6, 2008
C.J. Brown; OT	Recruit ratings: Scout: Rivals: (40)					
Marquan Brown; RB	Hope Mills, North Carolina	Gray's Creek HS	5 ft 9 in (1.75 m)	160 lb (73 kg)	4.35	May 22, 2007
Marquan Brown; RB	Recruit ratings: Scout: Rivals: (40)					
Mike Brown; TE	Reidsville, North Carolina	Reidsville HS	6 ft 4 in (1.93 m)	240 lb (110 kg)	4.7	Feb 6, 2008
Mike Brown; TE	Recruit ratings: Scout: Rivals: (40)					
Joshua Clark; OG	Dallas, North Carolina	North Gaston HS	6 ft 5 in (1.96 m)	265 lb (120 kg)	5.1	Feb 6, 2008
Joshua Clark; OG	Recruit ratings: Scout: Rivals: (40)					
Allen Crowder; DE	Mebane, North Carolina	Eastern Alamance HS	6 ft 3 in (1.91 m)	260 lb (120 kg)	4.8	Feb 6, 2008
Allen Crowder; DE	Recruit ratings: Scout: Rivals: (40)					
Dalton Faulds; OG	St. Augustine, Florida	Nease HS	6 ft 2.5 in (1.89 m)	258 lb (117 kg)	5.29	Dec 10, 2007
Dalton Faulds; OG	Recruit ratings: Scout: Rivals: (77)					
Anthony Garner; DT	Siler City, North Carolina	Jordan Matthews HS	6 ft 2 in (1.88 m)	295 lb (134 kg)	5	Oct 17, 2007
Anthony Garner; DT	Recruit ratings: Scout: Rivals: (75)					
Grant Harner; OG	Jacksonville, Florida	Bartram Trail HS	6 ft 6 in (1.98 m)	300 lb (140 kg)	-	Feb 6, 2008
Grant Harner; OG	Recruit ratings: Scout: Rivals: (40)					
T.J. Harper; OG	Poplarville, Mississippi	Pearl River	6 ft 2 in (1.88 m)	335 lb (152 kg)	-	Dec 17, 2007
T.J. Harper; OG	Recruit ratings: Scout: Rivals: (40)					
Jacobi Jenkins; WR/DB	Rocky Mount, North Carolina	Rocky Mount HS	6 ft 1 in (1.85 m)	170 lb (77 kg)	-	Sep 7, 2007
Jacobi Jenkins; WR/DB	Recruit ratings: Scout: Rivals: (40)					
Adrian Jones; WR/ATH	Laurinburg, North Carolina	Scotland HS	5 ft 11 in (1.80 m)	180 lb (82 kg)	4.40	Nov 27, 2007
Adrian Jones; WR/ATH	Recruit ratings: Scout: Rivals: (80)					
Robert Jones; DE	Tucker, Georgia	Tucker HS	6 ft 4 in (1.93 m)	260 lb (120 kg)	4.67	Feb 6, 2008
Robert Jones; DE	Recruit ratings: Scout: Rivals: (40)					
Josh Jordan; QB	Saint Amant, Louisiana	St. Amant HS	6 ft 4.5 in (1.94 m)	202 lb (92 kg)	4.61	Jan 20, 2008
Josh Jordan; QB	Recruit ratings: Scout: Rivals: (76)					
Max Joyner; S	Greenville, North Carolina	Junius H Rose HS	6 ft 2 in (1.88 m)	180 lb (82 kg)	4.5	Jun 26, 2007
Max Joyner; S	Recruit ratings: Scout: Rivals: (40)					
Logan Kudlinski; OT	Orange Park, Florida	Orange Park HS	6 ft 5 in (1.96 m)	265 lb (120 kg)	-	Feb 6, 2008
Logan Kudlinski; OT	Recruit ratings: Scout: Rivals: (40)					
Rahkeem Morgan; S/DB	Asheville, North Carolina	Asheville HS	6 ft 1 in (1.85 m)	180 lb (82 kg)	4.55	Feb 6, 2008
Rahkeem Morgan; S/DB	Recruit ratings: Scout: Rivals: (40)					
Leonard Paulk; CB	Columbia, South Carolina	Richland Northeast HS	5 ft 11 in (1.80 m)	180 lb (82 kg)	4.5	Oct 9, 2007
Leonard Paulk; CB	Recruit ratings: Scout: Rivals: (73)					
Justin Venable; S	Greensboro, North Carolina	Southeast Guilford HS	6 ft 2 in (1.88 m)	183 lb (83 kg)	-	Jul 20, 2007
Justin Venable; S	Recruit ratings: Scout: Rivals: (74)					
Joe Womack; WR/ATH	Jacksonville, North Carolina	Northside HS	6 ft 2 in (1.88 m)	195 lb (88 kg)	4.45	May 8, 2007
Joe Womack; WR/ATH	Recruit ratings: Scout: Rivals: (40)					
Overall recruit ranking: Scout: 93 Rivals: 81
‡ Refers to 40-yard dash; Note: In many cases, Scout, Rivals, 247Sports, On3, and ESPN may conflict in their listings of height, weight and 40 time.; In these cases, the average was taken. ESPN grades are on a 100-point scale.; Sources: "East Carolina 2008 Football Commitments". Rivals.; "Football Recruiting Commits". Scout.; "2008 Player commits". ESPN.; "Scout.com Team Recruiting Rankings". Scout.; "2008 Team Ranking". Rivals.com.

== Schedule ==
Date	Time	Opponent	Rank	Site	TV	Result	Attendance
August 30	12:00 pm	vs. No. 17 Virginia Tech*		Bank of America Stadium; Charlotte, North Carolina	ESPN	W 27–22	72,169
September 6	4:30 pm	No. 8 West Virginia*		Dowdy–Ficklen Stadium; Greenville, North Carolina	ESPN	W 24–3	43,610
September 13	3:00 pm	at Tulane	No. 14	Louisiana Superdome; New Orleans	WITN-TV	W 28–24	27,189
September 20	12:00 pm	at NC State*	No. 15	Carter–Finley Stadium; Raleigh, North Carolina (rivalry)	ESPN	L 24–30 ^{OT}	57,583
September 27	3:30 pm	Houston	No. 23	Dowdy–Ficklen Stadium; Greenville, North Carolina	CBSCS	L 24–41	43,641
October 11	12:00 pm	at Virginia*		Scott Stadium; Charlottesville, Virginia	LFS	L 20–35	52,398
October 18	12:00 pm	Memphis		Dowdy–Ficklen Stadium; Greenville, North Carolina	WITN-TV/CSS	W 30–10	41,216
November 2	8:00 pm	at UCF		Bright House Networks Stadium; Orlando, Florida	ESPN	W 13–10 ^{OT}	40,202
November 8	3:30 pm	Marshall^{†}		Dowdy–Ficklen Stadium; Greenville, North Carolina	CBSCS	W 19–16 ^{OT}	43,515
November 15	3:00 pm	at Southern Miss		M. M. Roberts Stadium; Hattiesburg, Mississippi	WITN-TV	L 3–21	30,658
November 22	4:00 pm	at UAB		Legion Field; Birmingham, Alabama	WITN-TV/CSS	W 17–13	11,453
November 29	1:00 pm	UTEP		Dowdy–Ficklen Stadium; Greenville, North Carolina	CBSCS	W 53–21	38,098
December 6	12:00 pm	at Tulsa		Chapman Stadium; Tulsa, Oklahoma (C–USA Championship)	ESPN2	W 27–24	22,740
January 2	4:00 pm	vs. Kentucky*		Liberty Bowl Memorial Stadium; Memphis, Tennessee (Liberty Bowl)	ESPN	L 19–25	56,125
*Non-conference game; ^{†}Homecoming; Rankings from AP Poll released prior to the game; All times are in Eastern time

== Coaching staff ==
Position	Name	Year at ECU	Alma Mater
Head Coach:	Skip Holtz	4th	Notre Dame '86
Offensive coordinator/ Quarterbacks Coach:	Todd Fitch	2nd	Ohio Wesleyan '86
Defensive coordinator Linebacker Coach:	Greg Hudson	3rd	Notre Dame '90
Offensive coordinator Offensive linemen coach:	Steve Shankweiler	4th(14th overall)	Davidson '74
Assistant head coach/ Defensive backs coach	Rick Smith	4th	Florida State '71
Director of strength & conditioning	Michael Golden	3rd	Central Connecticut State '92
Defensive end coach/ Special teams	Vernon Hargreaves	2nd	Connecticut '86
Wide receiver coach/ Recruiting coordinator	Donnie Kirkpatrick	4th	Lenoir-Rhyne '82
Tight ends coach:	Phil Petty	4th	South Carolina '01
Director of HS football relations	Harold Robinson	4th	East Carolina '72
Defensive tackle coach	Thomas Roggeman	4th	Notre Dame '85
Running backs coach	Junior Smith	4th	East Carolina '97
Director of operations	Clifford Snow	3rd	Central Connecticut State '83
Staff Assistant/ Defense Coach	Tim Carter	3rd	Tulane '01
Administrative Assistant to Coach Holtz	Courtney Bishop	-	-
Administrative Assistant	Ann Coyle	-	East Carolina '06
Administrative Assistant	Ryan Ormond	-	North Carolina '02

== Rankings ==
Ranking movements Legend: ██ Increase in ranking ██ Decrease in ranking — = Not ranked RV = Received votes
	Week															
Poll	Pre	1	2	3	4	5	6	7	8	9	10	11	12	13	14	Final
AP	—	RV 27	14	15	23	—	—	—	—	—	—	—	—	—	RV 29	—
Coaches	—	RV 28	20	17	RV 26	—	—	RV 42	—	—	—	—	—	—	RV 29	—
Harris	Not released					—	—	—	—	—	—	—	—	—	—	Not released
BCS	Not released							—	—	—	—	—	—	—	—	Not released

== Game summaries ==
=== Virginia Tech ===
	1	2	3	4	Total
#17 Virginia Tech	0	14	2	6	22
East Carolina	0	7	6	14	27

The meeting on August 30 was the 14th meeting between these two teams. These two teams met last year for the first time since 2000. Virginia Tech won that meeting and lead the head-to-head record 9-4. After a blocked field goal placed the Hokies up 16-13 over the Pirates, T.J. Lee would return the favor by blocking a Hokie punt and running it back for the game-winning touchdown, leading the Pirates to their first victory over Virginia Tech since 1992. This was the first time since 2002 that a Conference USA team had defeated a ranked BCS-conference team, and also made the Pirates the first C-USA team ever to defeat ranked teams in consecutive games (counting ECU's win over Boise State in last season's Hawaiʻi Bowl).

=== West Virginia ===
	1	2	3	4	Total
#8 West Virginia	0	3	0	0	3
East Carolina	7	10	7	0	24

The Mountaineers visited Greenville for the seventh time in school history, while the Pirates were looking for their first win against WVU in Greenville since September 30, 1995. Going into the game, West Virginia led in the overall matchup, 17-2.

ECU did not need any last-minute heroics to pull off their second straight upset over a ranked BCS-conference school. Quarterback Patrick Pinkney had an almost mistake-free game, going 22-for-28 through the air with a touchdown and no interceptions, while the Pirates defense kept WVU's normally high-powered offense out of the end zone (the first time since 2001 any WVU opponent had done so). The Pirates scored their first win over a top-10 team since beating Miami in 1999.

=== Tulane ===
	1	2	3	4	Total
#14 East Carolina	0	7	14	7	28
Tulane	0	7	14	3	24

#14 East Carolina visited New Orleans for the first time since the 2003 football season. Before the game, the Pirates led the series against this conference foe, 7-2, with both losses occurring in the Louisiana Superdome.

For the first time in a long time, the Pirates went into a game with a national ranking, but suffered a sluggish start against the Green Wave, who the week prior had held Alabama to a single offensive touchdown. After a perfect game against the Mountaineers, the Pirates suffered four turnovers on offense as the defense struggled after losing senior Defensive Linebacker Quentin Cotton to a severe knee injury. With the Green Wave up 24-21 in the 4th, the offensive line rallied back. Patrick Pinkney completed a pass to Jamar Bryant for the touchdown and brought the Pirates up 28-24 with 1:28 remaining. Pierre Bell's interception on the next Tulane drive would end it as the Pirates managed to sail past the Green Wave with the final score 28-24.

=== NC State ===
	1	2	3	4	OT	Total
#15 East Carolina	7	7	7	3	0	24
NC State	0	7	10	7	6	30

After barely escaping past Tulane, #15 ECU visited their intra-state rival in the state capital for the 21st time in the 26 game history. NCSU won the previous years' game 34-20 in Greenville and lead the all-time record 15-10.

Injuries were a major factor in the outcome of this game, but despite only dressing 45 of its players for the game, the Wolfpack managed to come on top over the Pirates, who fell to 3-1 overall. The key loss of Defensive Linebacker Quentin Cotton, and the two missed touchdown opportunities in the red zone for the Pirates would lead to an Overtime showdown as the score was tied at the last second, 24-24.

The Pirates came up with nothing after the first offensive series in Overtime, as Quarterback Patrick Pinkney was sacked and fumbled the ball, setting up a Wolfpack touchdown that gave the Pirates their first loss of the 2008 season, the final score: 30-24. The next time the two schools meet was pushed back to the 2010 season, to accommodate the completion of East Carolina's upcoming stadium expansion.

=== Houston ===
	1	2	3	4	Total
Houston	14	7	3	17	41
#23 East Carolina	7	3	7	7	24

#23 East Carolina hosted Houston for their conference home opener at Dowdy–Ficklen Stadium. ECU won in a shootout last fall, 37-35. The Pirates led this Conference USA West opponent overall, five games to three, but disaster would strike for a second week in a row.

The Pirate defense was unable to stop Case Keenum's 399 yard passing attack and could not muster enough offense to match it. The high-scoring Houston offense never trailed as the Pirates went down for a second straight week, losing 41-24 and was knocked out of the Top 25.

=== Virginia ===
	1	2	3	4	Total
East Carolina	6	0	7	7	20
Virginia	7	21	0	7	35

Coming off of their first bye week, East Carolina traveled to Charlottesville for the second time in this three game history. ECU beat this ACC member in Greenville in 2006, 31-21, and led the overall series 2-0.

After going up on the board early 6-0, Virginia would rally back to make the score 28-6 at halftime. A Pirate rally in the second half would be cut short as a fumble and botched punt were recovered by the Cavaliers. The Pirates would go on to lose to Virginia for the first time in this series' history, 35-20.

=== Memphis ===
	1	2	3	4	Total
Memphis	7	3	0	0	10
East Carolina	0	7	13	10	30

For ECU's second home conference game, they played the Tigers of Memphis. East Carolina won last fall's game 56-40 at the Liberty Bowl, in Memphis. In the 16 previous games played between these teams, the Pirates led the Tigers 10-6.

=== UCF ===
	1	2	3	4	OT	Total
East Carolina	0	0	3	7	3	13
UCF	3	7	0	0	0	10

East Carolina traveled to the Bright House Networks Stadium in Orlando for the third time in this series. The Pirates led the series six games to one.

=== Marshall ===
	1	2	3	4	OT	Total
Marshall	0	3	6	7	0	16
East Carolina	3	10	3	0	3	19

The Thundering Herd traveled to North Carolina for the fifth time in this storied series. After the 1970 contest, Marshall's plane crashed while traveling back to Huntington. The 2001 GMAC Bowl is the highest-scoring bowl game in Division I-A (now Division I FBS) history. Marshall won 64-61 in two overtimes. The Pirates led the series 6-3.

=== Southern Miss ===
	1	2	3	4	Total
East Carolina	0	3	0	0	3
Southern Miss	0	7	0	14	21

Southern Miss hosted East Carolina in the 34th meeting of these two teams. Of the 33 games in the history of the series, the Pirates have won only eight times.

=== UAB ===
	1	2	3	4	Total
East Carolina	7	0	3	7	17
UAB	7	0	3	3	13

The Pirates traveled to Birmingham for the fourth time to face the Blazers. Before this game, East Carolina had never won a road contest at UAB's home field. UAB led the overall series 4-3.

=== UTEP ===
	1	2	3	4	Total
UTEP	0	7	7	7	21
East Carolina	14	16	10	13	53

The Pirates welcome the Miners to Greenville for the first time ever. East Carolina and this Conference USA West opponent are meeting for the second time. The first meeting occurred last fall in El Paso, Texas. ECU won in overtime, 45-42 in the Sun Bowl.

=== 2008 Conference USA Championship ===
	1	2	3	4	Total
East Carolina	14	3	7	3	27
Tulsa	10	7	0	7	24

The Pirates, after clenching their division in a 17-13 win over the UAB Blazers, will be representing Conference USA East in a battle against the champion of the West division, the Tulsa Golden Hurricanes. Tulsa clenched the division title with a win over Marshall and a Houston loss to Rice. Tulsa leads the all-time series against the Pirates, 5-2.

=== 2009 Liberty Bowl ===
	1	2	3	4	Total
Kentucky	0	3	13	9	25
East Carolina	3	13	3	0	19

After defeating Tulsa in the 2008 Conference USA Football Championship and winning their first Conference Championship in more than thirty years, the Pirates immediately accepted an invitation to play in the Liberty Bowl, which the team had not done in thirteen years. The last time East Carolina went to the Liberty Bowl was in 1995, where they defeated Stanford 19-13.

The Pirates faced Kentucky from the SEC and lost 17-20 after they went into overtime and lost by a field goal.

== Postseason ==
=== NFL draft picks ===
- Davon Drew – Round 5: 13th (149th overall) – Baltimore Ravens

=== Awards ===
- Sporting News Coach-of-the-Year – Skip Holtz
- Sporting News Defensive MVP – C. J. Wilson – Jr. DL
- Pontiac Game Changing Performance Winner Week 1: – T.J. Lee – Sr. WR

=== Honors ===
1st Team All C-USA
- C. J. Wilson – Jr. DL
- Van Eskridge – Jr. DB

2nd Team All C-USA
- Sean Allen – Jr. OL
- Pierre Bell – Sr. LB

C-USA Team Honorable Mentions
- Davon Drew – Sr. TE
- Linval Joseph – So. DL
- Jay Ross – Jr. DL
- Zack Slate – Sr. DL
- Nick Johnson – Jr. LB
- Wilson Raynor – Sr. LS

C-USA All Freshman Team
- Emanuel Davis – DB

== Statistics ==
=== Team ===
	Team	Opp
Scoring	328	295
Points per game	23.4	21.1
First downs	241	232
Rushing	104	88
Passing	126	125
Penalty	11	19
Total offense	4765	4662
Avg. per play	5.1	4.9
Avg. per game	340.4	333.0
Fumbles-Lost	27-19	26-11
Penalties–yards	82-742	62-484
Avg. per game	53.0	34.6

	Team	Opp
Punts–yards	73-3207	75-3037
Avg per punt	43.9	40.5
Time of possession/Game	30:38	29:22
3rd down conversions	76/206	75/212
4th down conversions	9/16	10/21
Touchdowns scored	38	38
Field goals–attempts-Long	22-35	13-25
PAT–attempts	34-37	32-36
Attendance	210080	242223
Games/Avg. per game	5/42016	7/34603
Neutral Site Avg	2/64147	

==== Scores by quarter ====
	1	2	3	4	OT	Total
East Carolina	68	86	90	78	6	328
Opponents	48	96	58	87	6	295

=== Offense ===
==== Rushing ====
Name	GP	Att	Gain	Loss	Net	Avg	Td	Long	Avg/g
Whitley, Norman	14	142	722	24	698	4.9	4	69	49.9
Simmons, Brandon	14	134	484	10	474	3.5	7	28	33.9
Williams, Jonathan	7	75	409	29	380	5.1	5	68	54.3
Rogers, J.R.	10	33	150	16	134	4.1	0	25	13.4
Harris, Dwayne	10	19	82	6	76	4.0	0	15	7.6
Pinkney, Patrick	14	90	222	172	50	0.6	1	14	3.6
Bowman, Michael	5	1	3	0	3	3.0	0	3	0.6
Gidrey, Kevin	14	1	2	0	2	2.0	0	2	0.1
Simmons, Jason	13	2	0	0	0	0.0	0	0	0.0
Ballard, Darnell	1	1	0	2	-2	-2.0	0	0	-2.0
Kass, Rob	7	9	36	38	-2	-0.2	0	20	-0.3
Sloan, Joe	14	1	0	6	-6	-6.0	0	0	-0.4
Freeney, Darryl	14	1	0	10	-10	-10.0	0	0	-0.7
Team	6	9	0	28	-28	-3.1	0	0	-4.7
Total	14	518	2110	341	1769	3.4	17	69	126.4

==== Passing ====
Name	GP	Effic	Att-cmp-int	Pct	Yds	Td	Lng	Avg/g
Pinkney, Patrick	14	131.3	223-363-7	61.4	2675	13	80	191.1
Kass, Rob	7	101.0	25-54-2	46.3	321	2	42	45.9
Drew, Davon	14	0.0	0-1-0	0.0	0	0	0	0.0
Harris, Dwayne	10	0.0	0-0-0	0.0	0	0	0	0.0
Total	14	127.1	248-418-9	59.3	2996	15	80	214.0

==== Receiving ====
Name	GP	No.	Yds	Avg	TD	Long	Avg/G
Harris, Dwayne	10	58	654	11.3	1	52	65.4
Drew, Davon	14	43	695	16.2	3	42	49.6
Simmons, Brandon	14	27	172	6.4	3	42	12.3
Taylor, Alex	14	23	310	13.5	1	47	22.1
Freeney, Darryl	14	22	352	16.0	2	80	25.1
Bryant, Jamar	5	19	216	11.4	3	35	43.2
Womack, Joe	9	17	230	13.5	0	41	25.6
Lee, T.J.	7	9	136	15.1	0	41	19.4
Whitley, Norman	14	7	83	11.9	1	51	5.9
Rogers, J.R.	10	6	16	2.7	0	9	1.6
Williams, Jonathan	7	5	19	3.8	0	10	2.7
Gidrey, Kevin	14	4	26	6.5	1	13	1.9
Willis, Reyn	12	3	44	14.7	0	24	3.7
Bowman, Michael	5	2	20	10.0	0	15	4.0
Kraemer, J.R.	14	1	3	3.0	0	3	0.2
Terrell, T.J.	5	1	3	3.0	0	3	0.6
Total	14	247	2979	12.1	15	80	212.8

=== Defense ===
Name	GP	Tackles				Sacks	Pass defense				Fumbles		Blkd Kick	Safety
Name	GP	Solo	Ast	Total	TFL-Yds	No-Yds	Int-Yds	BrUp	PD	QBH	Rcv-Yds	FF	Blkd Kick	Safety
Johnson, Nick	14	55	47	102	10.0-32	1.0-17	2-25	3	5	3	1-5	1	.	.
Bell, Pierre	13	57	43	100	9.5-32	1.0-12	2-0	5	7	2	2-0	1	.	.
Eskridge, Van	14	59	38	97	1.0-2	.	4-89	3	7	.	1-4	2	.	.
Wilson, C.J.	14	35	35	70	18.5-84	10.5-61	.	1	1	5	.	1	1	.
Chambliss, Jeremy	14	22	38	60	6.0-20	1.0-7	.	2	2	1	.	.	.	.
Ross, Jay	14	18	30	48	9.5-43	5.0-34	.	.	.	4	2-5	.	1	.
Slate, Zack	13	25	23	48	9.0-64	5.0-38	.	1	1	5	.	3	.	.
Milbrook, J.J.	13	22	25	47	2.0-6	.	2-4	7	9	.	1-26	1	.	.
Davis, Emanuel	14	27	18	45	2.5-8	.	4-58	8	12	1	1-0	1	.	.
Joseph, Linval	14	22	21	43	8.0-34	2.5-23	.	1	1	1	.	1	2	.
Best, Leon	13	21	21	42	.	.	1-5	1	2	.	.	2	.	.
Marshall, Dekota	14	26	15	41	1.5-2	.	1-0	6	7	1	.	.	.	.
Simmons, Travis	14	17	13	30	.	.	2-72	2	4	.	1-40	.	.	.
Mattocks, Chris	14	11	18	29	0.5-1	.	.	1	1	.	.	1	.	.
Smith, Josh	11	8	10	18	2.0-3	1.0-2	.	.	.	1	.	.	.	.
Lineback, Dustin	14	13	5	18	.	.	.	.	.	.	1-0	.	.	.
Robinson, Scotty	10	10	7	17	1.5-6	1.0-6	.	1	1	.	.	.	.	.
Perryman, Cliff	9	5	11	16	1.5-5	.	.	.	.	.	.	.	.	.
Mitchell, Khalif	7	6	10	16	3.0-9	1.0-6	.	.	.	1	.	.	.	.
Reynolds, Darryl	10	12	3	15	.	.	.	.	.	.	.	.	.	.
Cotton, Quentin	3	6	9	15	1.5-8	1.5-8	2-20	3	5	.	.	.	.	.
Hewett, Jerek	6	9	4	13	1.0-1	.	1-5	2	3	.	.	1	.	.
Hands, Marcus	6	3	7	10	0.5-1	.	.	.	.	1	1-0	.	.	.
Blacknall, Derek	13	3	5	8	.	.	.	.	.	.	.	.	.	.
Wallace, Devon	8	4	3	7	.	.	.	.	.	.	.	.	.	.
Mack, Dalvon	7	3	3	6	.	.	.	.	.	.	.	.	.	.
Thompson, Matt	9	1	4	5	.	.	.	.	.	.	.	.	.	.
Patterson, Mel	7	1	4	5	.	.	.	.	.	.	.	.	.	.
Carter, Julian	11	3	2	5	.	.	.	.	.	.	.	.	.	.
Spence, Steve	14	3	1	4	.	.	.	.	.	.	.	.	.	.
Jones, Robert	9	2	2	4	2.0-8	0.5-4	.	.	.	1	.	.	.	.
Willis, Reyn	12	1	3	4	.	.	.	.	.	.	.	.	.	.
Kraemer, J.R.	14	3	1	4	.	.	.	.	.	.	.	.	.	.
Von Bargen, Kurtis	8	2	2	4	.	.	.	.	.	.	.	.	.	.
Pick, Matt	2	.	3	3	.	.	.	.	.	.	.	.	.	.
Haynes, Austin	5	2	1	3	.	.	.	1	1	.	.	.	.	.
Lee, T.J.	7	2	.	2	.	.	.	.	.	.	.	.	1	.
Allison, Antonio	8	1	1	2	.	.	.	.	.	1	.	.	.	.
Mercer, Maurice	5	2	.	2	.	.	.	.	.	.	.	.	.	.
Raynor, Wilson	14	1	1	2	.	.	.	.	.	.	.	.	.	.
Dodge, Matt	14	2	.	2	.	.	.	.	.	.	.	.	.	.
Scott, D.J.	13	.	1	1	.	.	.	.	.	.	.	.	.	.
Palmer, Doug	14	1	.	1	.	.	.	.	.	.	.	.	.	.
Simmons, Jason	13	.	1	1	.	.	.	.	.	.	.	.	.	.
McFadden, D.J.	6	.	1	1	.	.	.	.	.	.	.	.	.	.
Rogers, J.R.	10	1	.	1	.	.	.	.	.	.	.	.	.	.
Bryant, Jamar	5	.	1	1	.	.	.	.	.	.	.	.	.	.
Taylor, Alex	14	1	.	1	.	.	.	.	.	.	.	.	.	.
Freeney, Darryl	14	1	.	1	.	.	.	.	.	.	.	.	.	.
Simmons, Brandon	14	1	.	1	.	.	.	.	.	.	.	.	.	.
Drew, Davon	14	.	1	1	.	.	.	.	.	.	.	.	.	.
Harris, Dwayne	10	1	.	1	.	.	.	.	.	.	.	.	.	.
Hampton, Spencer	2	.	.	.	.	.	1-0	.	1	.	.	.	.	.
Total	14	531	492	1023	91-369	31-217	22-278	48	70	28	11-80	15	5	.

=== Special teams ===
Name	Punting									Kickoffs				
Name	No.	Yds	Avg	Long	TB	FC	I20	50+	Blkd	No.	Yds	Avg	TB	OB
Dodge, Matt	73	3207	43.9	73	13	8	20	25	0	71	4231	59.6	4	5
Hartman, Ben										1	54	54.0	0	0
Total	73	3207	43.9	73	13	8	20	25	0	72	4285	59.5	4	5

Field goals
Name	Made-Att	Pct	01-19	20-29	30-39	40-49	50-99	Long	Blkd
Ryan, Ben	1-3	33.3	0-0	0-0	0-1	1-2	0-0	42	0
Dodge, Matt	0-1	0.0	0-0	0-0	0-0	0-1	0-0	0	0
Hartman, Ben	21-31	67.7	0-0	8-8	8-11	4-10	1-2	51	0

Name	Punt returns					Kick returns				
Name	No.	Yds	Avg	TD	Long	No.	Yds	Avg	TD	Long
Simmons, Travis	13	147	11.3	0	28					
Freeney, Darryl	13	95	7.3	0	25					
Milbrook, J.J.	2	-11	-5.5	0	2					
Lee, T.J.	1	37	37.0	1	27	3	52	17.3	0	25
Harris, Dwayne						19	446	23.5	0	59
Bowman, Michael						10	235	23.5	0	61
Williams, Jonathan						7	129	18.4	0	37
Lineback, Dustin						2	25	12.5	0	14
Gidrey, Kevin						1	10	10.0	0	10
Hewett, Jerek						1	6	6.0	0	6
Kraemer, J.R.						1	5	5.0	0	5
Taylor, Alex						1	40	40.0	1	40
Mack, Dalvon						1	-2	-2.0	0	0
Rogers, J.R.						1	36	36.0	0	36
Total	34	258	7.6	0	46	62	1506	24.3	1	96
