= Morgan Newton =

American football player (born c.1991)

No. 47
- Position: Quarterback

Personal information
- Born: c. 1991 (age 34–35); Indianapolis, Indiana, U.S.
- Listed height: 6 ft 4 in (1.93 m)
- Listed weight: 235 lb (107 kg)

Career information
- High school: Carmel (Carmel, Indiana)
- College: Kentucky
- NFL draft: 2013: undrafted

Career history
- New York Giants (2013)*
- * Offseason or practice squad member only

Awards and highlights
- SEC All-Freshman Team by SEC coaches (2009)

Morgan Newton (born c. 1991) is an American former football quarterback. Newton played college football for the Kentucky Wildcats.

== Early life ==
Newton attended Carmel High School in Carmel, Indiana. During his sophomore year at Carmel High School, he won the IHSAA Football State Championship in 2007. The Greyhounds finished as state runner-up in the 2006 and 2008 seasons. As a senior in 2008, Newton won the Indiana Mr. Football Award.

== College career ==
Newton committed to play football for the University of Kentucky Wildcats on August 21, 2008, and was reportedly advised by Indianapolis Colts quarterback Peyton Manning during the decision-making process. Newton missed the first five games of his true freshman season and was intended to redshirt behind starter Mike Hartline but Hartline suffered a season-ending injury in the fifth game of the year, a loss at South Carolina that left Kentucky 2–3 on the season. Newton then became the starter and led Kentucky to a 5–2 record in its final seven regular season games, which enabled Kentucky to play in the 2009 Music City Bowl. In only a half season of play, Newton completed his true freshman season completing 75 of 135 passes (55.6%) for 706 yards and 6 touchdowns and 3 interceptions, good for a 109.71 quarterback rating. Newton also rushed for 130 yards and 2 touchdowns.

Entering 2010, Newton faced competition from Ryan Mossakowski and former starter Mike Hartline for Kentucky's starting quarterback slot.

Hartline won the starting position and didn't give Newton much playing time in 2010 while he watched Hartline have a highlight reel season. Much of Newton's playing time came in the game against Eastern Kentucky University, and in the Birmingham Bowl against Pittsburgh (Hartline was out due to suspension).

== Professional career ==
On May 17, 2013, he was signed by the New York Giants and it was announced he would play tight end. Newton was waived on May 30, 2013.
