= Red Jacket, West Virginia =

- Census-designated place (CDP)
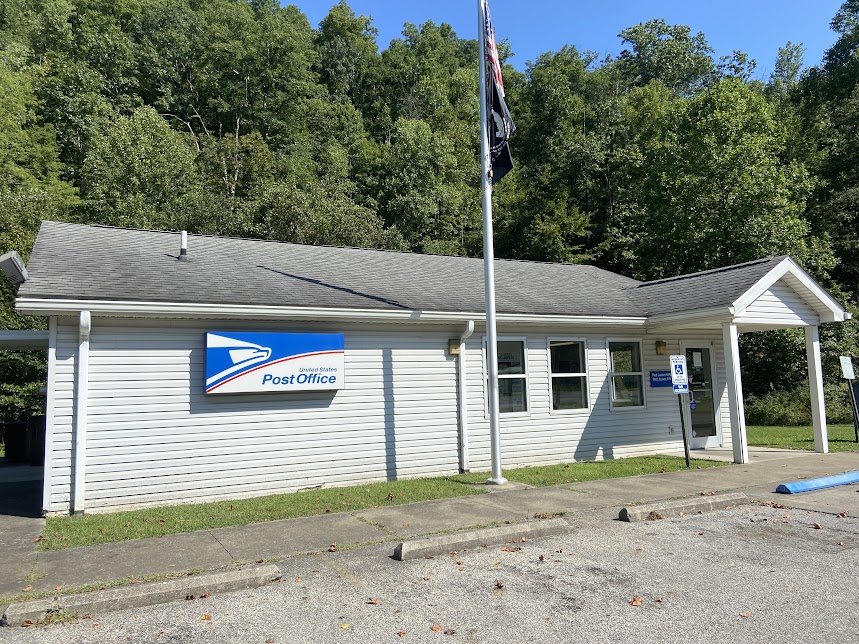
- Red Jacket post office

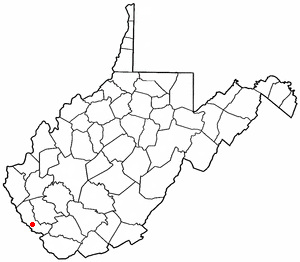
- Location of Red Jacket, West Virginia
- Coordinates: 37°38′50″N 82°8′16″W
- Country: United States
- State: West Virginia
- County: Mingo

Area
  - Total: 5.3 sq mi (13.6 km^{2})
  - Land: 5.3 sq mi (13.6 km^{2})
  - Water: 0 sq mi (0.0 km^{2})
- Elevation: 794 ft (242 m)

Population (2020)
  - Total: 525
  - Density: 100/sq mi (38.6/km^{2})
- Time zone: UTC-5 (Eastern (EST))
  - Summer (DST): UTC-4 (EDT)
- ZIP code: 25692
- Area code: 304
- FIPS code: 54-67396
- GNIS feature ID: 1545454

Red Jacket is a census-designated place (CDP) in Mingo County, West Virginia, United States. The population was 525 at the 2020 census (down from 581 at the 2010 census). The community was named for Red Jacket, a Seneca chief.

== Geography ==
According to the United States Census Bureau, the CDP has a total area of 5.3 square miles (14 km^{2}), all land.

== Demographics ==
As of the census of 2000, there were 728 people, 275 households, and 210 families residing in the CDP. The population density was 139.8 people per square mile (54.0 people/km^{2}). There were 313 housing units at an average density of 60.1 units per square mile (23.2 units/km^{2}). The racial makeup of the CDP was 92.03% White, 7.28% African American, and 0.69% from two or more races. Hispanic or Latino of any race were 0.14% of the population.

There were 275 households, out of which 40.4% had children under the age of 18 living with them, 54.5% were married couples living together, 18.2% had a female householder with no husband present, and 23.3% were non-families. 20.4% of all households were made up of individuals, and 9.8% had someone living alone who was 65 years of age or older. The average household size was 2.65 and the average family size was 3.08.

In the CDP, the population was spread out, with 29.0% under the age of 18, 8.0% from 18 to 24, 30.9% from 25 to 44, 21.3% from 45 to 64, and 10.9% who were 65 years of age or older. The median age was 34 years. For every 100 females, there were 85.2 males. For every 100 females age 18 and over, there were 80.8 males.

The median income for a household in the CDP was $21,364, and the median income for a family was $35,227. Males had a median income of $31,406 versus $11,042 for females. The per capita income for the CDP was $12,809. About 29.0% of families and 37.2% of the population were below the poverty line, including 59.2% of those under age 18 and 8.8% of those age 65 or over.

== Notable person ==
- Doc Edwards, former Major League Baseball player and manager
