= Magnolia, Kentucky =

Unincorporated community in Kentucky, United States

Magnolia
- Census-designated place (CDP)
- Location within Kentucky
- Coordinates: 37°26′38″N 85°44′37″W
- Country: United States
- State: Kentucky
- County: LaRue

Area
  - Total: 2.05 sq mi (5.30 km^{2})
  - Land: 2.04 sq mi (5.28 km^{2})
  - Water: 0.0077 sq mi (0.02 km^{2})
- Elevation: 860 ft (260 m)

Population (2020)
  - Total: 535
  - Density: 262.3/sq mi (101.29/km^{2})
- Time zone: UTC-5 (Eastern (EST))
  - Summer (DST): UTC-4 (EDT)
- Area code: 270
- GNIS feature ID: 497453

Magnolia is a census-designated place and unincorporated community in LaRue County, Kentucky, United States. As of the 2020 census, Magnolia had a population of 535. The Magnolia area was settled in the 1780s primarily by Virginians seeking land following the American Revolution.

== History ==
According to LaRue county's website, Magnolia was first used as a stage coach stop around the year 1850. A post office was built in April, 1851, and it was named after the postmasters' wife. Later, the post office was moved to the present site in a place that was called Centerpoint, but soon changed its name to Magnolia.

== Demographics ==
As of the 2020 census, there were 535 people, 249 housing units, and 259 families in the CDP. The racial makeup of the CDP was 94.6% White, 1.1% African American, 0.3% Native American, 0.7% from some other race, and 3.1% from two or more races. Those of Hispanic or Latino origin made up 2.2% of the population.

The ancestry of the CDP was 15.6% American, 8.0% German, 7.4% English, 6.8% Irish, and 4.6% Scottish.

The median age was 41.7 years old. 12.8% of the population were 65 or older, with 2.1% between the ages of 65 and 74, and 10.7% between the ages of 75 and 84. 13.9% of the population were under 18, with 7.9% under 5, 4.7% between the ages of 5 and 14, and 1.3% between 15 and 17.

The median household income was $40,114, with families having $48,409, married couples having $62,781, and non-families having $17,788. 31.1% of the population were in poverty, with 39.8% of people under 18, 33.3% of people between the ages of 18 and 64, and 8.6% of people 65 or older were in poverty.

Historical population
Census	Pop.	Note	%±
2010	524		—
2020	535		2.1%
U.S. Decennial Census

== Education ==
All of Larue County is in the Larue County School District.
