= Mike Hartline =

American football player and coach (born 1988)

South Florida Bulls
- Title: Quarterbacks coach

Personal information
- Born: June 13, 1988 (age 38); Canton, Ohio, U.S.
- Listed height: 6 ft 6 in (1.98 m)
- Listed weight: 210 lb (95 kg)

Career information
- High school: Canton (OH) GlenOak
- College: Kentucky
- NFL draft: 2011: undrafted

Career history

Playing
- Indianapolis Colts (2011)*; New England Patriots (2012)*
- * Offseason or practice squad member only

Coaching
- Ohio State (2015–2016) Intern; Cincinnati (2017–2018) Offensive quality control & assistant quarterbacks; Ohio Dominican (2019–2021) Offensive coordinator & quarterbacks coach; Auburn (2022) Offensive analyst & quarterbacks coach; Charlotte (2023) Pass game coordinator & wide receivers coach; Coastal Carolina (2024) Offensive analyst; Kentucky (2025) Offensive quality control; South Florida (2026–present) Quarterbacks coach
- Stats at Pro Football Reference

Mike Hartline (born June 13, 1988) is an American football coach and former quarterback who is currently the quarterbacks coach at the University of South Florida. He spent the 2024 season at Coastal Carolina as an offensive analyst and the 2023 season at Charlotte as their wide receivers coach. He was the offensive coordinator at Ohio Dominican University from 2019 to 2021 and the quarterbacks coach at Auburn during the 2022 season. He has also spent time on the coaching staffs at the University of Cincinnati and Ohio State University. He was signed by the Indianapolis Colts as an undrafted free agent in 2011. He was signed by the New England Patriots in January 2012, but released in May 2012. He played college football at the University of Kentucky.

== Early life ==
Hartline was born in suburban Canton, Ohio. Both he and his older brother Brian, who is a former NFL wide receiver and current head coach at South Florida, played football at GlenOak High School in Canton.

While a sophomore at GlenOak High School, Hartline became the starting quarterback for the team when his brother Brian moved from quarterback to wide receiver. He started at quarterback his last two years in high school, attracting the attention of college scouts. In addition to Kentucky, he also expressed an interest in Ohio State (where his brother played) and Wisconsin.

== College career ==
Hartline signed with the Wildcats and redshirted in 2006. He saw limited action in 2007, backing up starting quarterback André Woodson. Hartline won the starting quarterback job in 2008 following Woodson's graduation, although later in the season he shared quarterback duties with freshman Randall Cobb. He stands 6 feet 6 inches tall and weighs 206 pounds.

On September 15, 2008, Hartline was chosen as the SEC Offensive Player of the Week. In Kentucky's game against Middle Tennessee State University on September 13, Hartline completed 28 of 47 passes for 254 yards with two touchdowns and no interceptions. On January 2, 2009, Hartline led the Wildcats to a victory over East Carolina in the Liberty Bowl, taking all snaps at quarterback due to an injury to Cobb, retaining his starting quarterback role for the Wildcats.

In the 2008 season, Hartline completed 172 of 311 passes for 1,666 yards. He threw nine touchdown passes versus eight interceptions, completed 55.3% of his pass attempts and had a quarterback rating of 104.7.

He completed 32-of-42 passes for 4 touchdowns and 349 yards during a win against the University of South Carolina in October 2010, rallying the team from a 28–10 halftime deficit. He was named the National Performer of the Week and National Quarterback of the Week for his efforts.

The 2010 season was Hartline's best statistical season, throwing for 3,178 yards with 268 completions on 405 attempts. He finished the season with 23 touchdowns and 9 interceptions. Despite leading the Wildcats to the BBVA Compass Bowl (now known as the Birmingham Bowl), Hartline would be unable to play in the final game of his collegiate career due to suspension.

== Professional career ==
Pre-draft measurables
Height	Weight	40-yard dash	10-yard split	20-yard split	20-yard shuttle	Three-cone drill	Vertical jump	Broad jump
6 ft 5 in (1.96 m)	219 lb (99 kg)	4.93 s	1.68 s	2.85 s	4.41 s	6.92 s	27.5 in (0.70 m)	9 ft 8 in (2.95 m)
All values from Pro Day

=== Indianapolis Colts ===
Hartline was signed by the Indianapolis Colts as an undrafted free agent following the 2011 NFL draft on July 26, 2011. He was waived on August 28.

=== New England Patriots ===
On January 12, 2012, the Patriots signed Hartline for the 2012 season. He was released on May 15, 2012.

== Post-playing career ==
After his playing career ended, Hartline worked as an account executive for the Miami Dolphins before being hired by Ohio State in 2015 as a quarterback coach intern. He was added to the coaching staff at Cincinnati as a quality control and assistant quarterbacks coach. He was named the offensive coordinator at Ohio Dominican in 2019.

In 2022, Hartline was hired as an offensive analyst by Auburn. Following Bryan Harsin's dismissal as head coach, interim head coach Cadillac Williams elevated Hartline to quarterbacks coach for the rest of the season.

Hartline was hired by new Charlotte 49ers head coach Biff Poggi as the pass game coordinator and wide receivers coach for the upcoming 2023 season.

Hartline was hired by the Coastal Carolina Chanticleers football team as an offensive analyst for the 2024 season.
