= Florida Gators football statistical leaders =

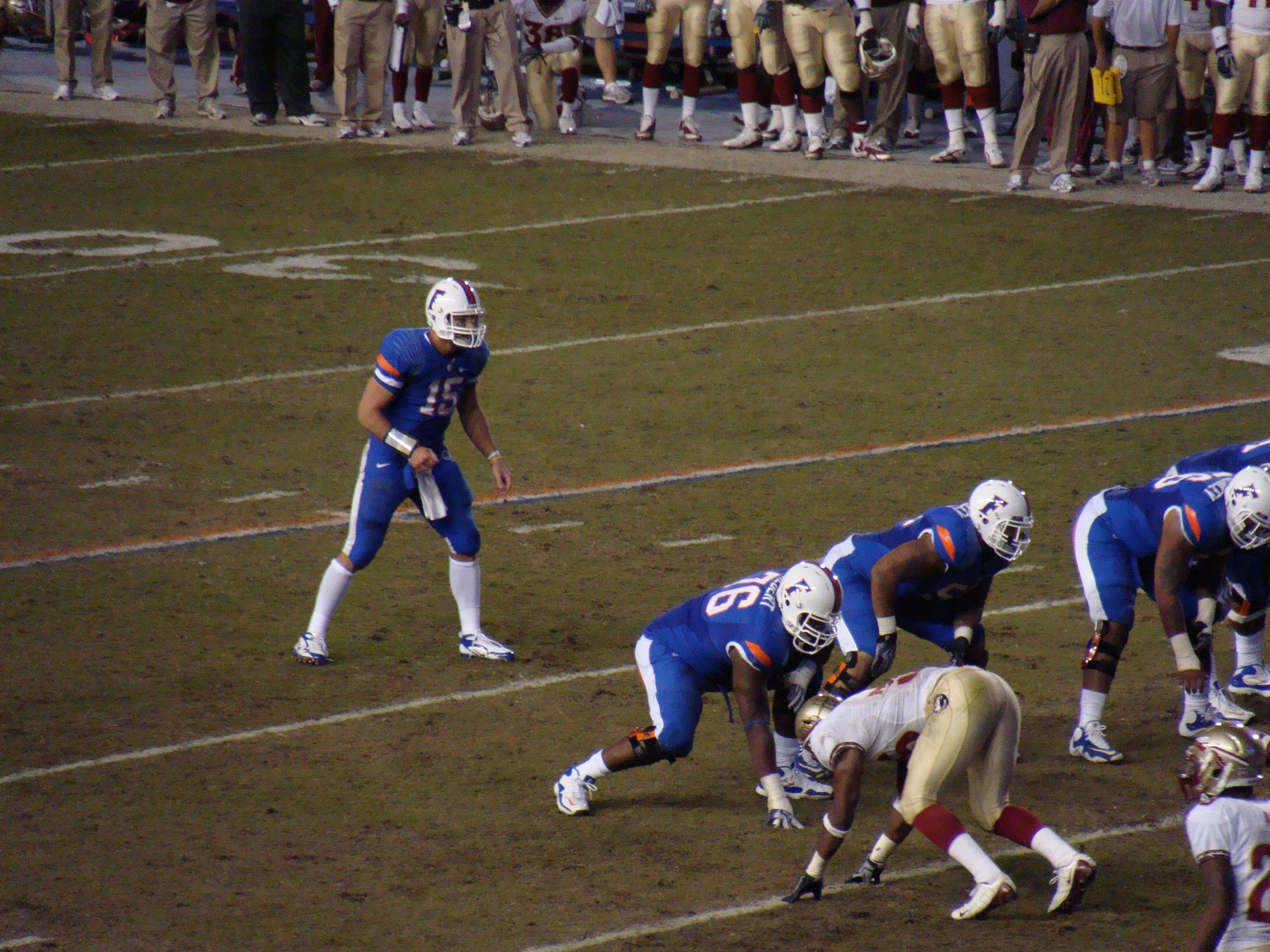
Tim Tebow holds Florida career, single-season, and single-game records in total offense and total touchdowns.

The Florida Gators football statistical leaders are individual statistical leaders of the Florida Gators football program in various categories, including passing, rushing, receiving, total offense, defensive stats, and kicking. Within those areas, the lists identify single-game, Single season and career leaders. The Gators represent the University of Florida in the NCAA's Southeastern Conference.

Although Florida began competing in intercollegiate football in 1906, the school's official record book considers the "modern era" to have begun in 1950. Records from before this year are often incomplete and inconsistent, and they are generally not included in these lists.

These lists are dominated by more recent players for several reasons:

- Since 1950, seasons have increased from 10 games to 11 and then 12 games in length.
- Freshmen were barred from varsity football due to conference rules since 1922, and the NCAA didn't allow freshmen to play varsity football until 1972 (with the exception of the World War II years), allowing players to have four-year careers.
- Bowl games only began counting toward single-season and career statistics in 2002. The Gators have played in 15 bowl games since then, giving recent players an extra game to accumulate statistics.
- Similarly, the Gators have played in the SEC Championship Game 12 times since it began in 1992, so players in those seasons had 12 games to rack up stats.
- Due to COVID-19 issues, the NCAA ruled that the 2020 season would not count against the athletic eligibility of any football player, giving everyone who played in that season the opportunity for five years of eligibility instead of the normal four.
- All of the top 10 Gator seasons when ranked by total offensive yards have come under recent coaches Steve Spurrier (1990–2001) and Urban Meyer (2005–2010). Indeed, the offensive lists are dominated by players who played under one of these coaches.

These lists are updated through Week 12 of the 2026 season. Active players are listed in bold.

== Passing ==
=== Passing yards ===
Career
Rank	Player	Yards	Years
1	Chris Leak	11,213	2003 2004 2005 2006
2	Danny Wuerffel	10,875	1993 1994 1995 1996
3	Shane Matthews	9,287	1989 1990 1991 1992
4	Tim Tebow	9,285	2006 2007 2008 2009
5	Rex Grossman	9,164	2000 2001 2002
6	Kerwin Bell	7,585	1984 1985 1986 1987
7	John Reaves	7,549	1969 1970 1971
8	Kyle Trask	7,386	2018 2019 2020
9	Wayne Peace	7,206	1980 1981 1982 1983
10	Doug Johnson	7,114	1996 1997 1998 1999

Single season
Rank	Player	Yards	Year
1	Kyle Trask	4,283	2020
2	Rex Grossman	3,896	2001
3	Danny Wuerffel	3,625	1996
4	Rex Grossman	3,402	2002
5	Tim Tebow	3,286	2007
6	Danny Wuerffel	3,266	1995
7	Shane Matthews	3,205	1992
8	Chris Leak	3,197	2004
9	Shane Matthews	3,130	1991
10	Shane Matthews	2,952	1990

Single game
Rank	Player	Yards	Year	Opponent
1	Tim Tebow	482	2009	Cincinnati (Sugar Bowl)
2	Kyle Trask	474	2020	Georgia
	Kyle Trask	474	2020	LSU
4	Rex Grossman	464	2001	LSU
	Emory Jones	464	2021	Samford
6	Danny Wuerffel	462	1996	Arkansas
7	Doug Johnson	460	1998	Vanderbilt
8	Eric Kresser	458	1995	Northern Illinois
9	DJ Lagway	456	2024	Samford
10	Anthony Richardson	453	2022	Tennessee

=== Passing touchdowns ===
Career
Rank	Player	TDs	Years
1	Danny Wuerffel	114	1993 1994 1995 1996
2	Chris Leak	88	2003 2004 2005 2006
	Tim Tebow	88	2006 2007 2008 2009
4	Rex Grossman	77	2000 2001 2002
5	Shane Matthews	74	1989 1990 1991 1992
6	Kyle Trask	69	2018 2019 2020
7	Doug Johnson	62	1996 1997 1998 1999
8	Kerwin Bell	56	1984 1985 1986 1987
9	John Reaves	54	1969 1970 1971
10	Terry Dean	39	1991 1992 1993 1994

Single season
Rank	Player	TDs	Year
1	Kyle Trask	43	2020
2	Danny Wuerffel	39	1996
3	Danny Wuerffel	35	1995
4	Rex Grossman	34	2001
5	Tim Tebow	32	2007
6	Tim Tebow	30	2008
7	Chris Leak	29	2004
8	Shane Matthews	28	1991
9	Kyle Trask	25	2019
10	John Reaves	24	1969
	Feleipe Franks	24	2018

Single game
Rank	Player	TDs	Year	Opponent
1	Terry Dean	7	1994	New Mexico State
	Doug Johnson	7	1997	Central Michigan
3	Terry Dean	6	1993	SW Louisiana
	Danny Wuerffel	6	1995	Tennessee
	Eric Kresser	6	1995	Northern Illinois
	Danny Wuerffel	6	1996	Alabama
	Chris Leak	6	2004	South Carolina
	Kyle Trask	6	2020	Ole Miss, Arkansas
	Emory Jones	6	2021	Samford

=== Completion percentage ===
Career (min. 250 pass attempts)
Rank	Player	Comp%	Years
1	Graham Mertz	73.7	2023 2024
2	Kyle Trask	67.9	2018 2019 2020
3	Tim Tebow	66.4	2006 2007 2008 2009
4	Emory Jones	64.6	2018 2019 2020 2021
5	DJ Lagway	62.0	2024 2025
6	John Brantley	61.7	2008 2009 2010 2011
7	Wayne Peace	61.6	1980 1981 1982 1983
8	Chris Leak	61.4	2003 2004 2005 2006
9	Rex Grossman	61.0	2000 2001 2002
10	Danny Wuerffel	60.5	1993 1994 1995 1996

== Rushing ==
=== Rushing yards ===
Career
Rank	Player	Yards	Years
1	Errict Rhett	4,163	1990 1991 1992 1993
2	Emmitt Smith	3,928	1987 1988 1989
3	Neal Anderson	3,234	1982 1983 1984 1985
4	Fred Taylor	3,075	1994 1995 1996 1997
5	Earnest Graham	3,065	1999 2000 2001 2002
6	Tim Tebow	2,947	2006 2007 2008 2009
7	**Jadan Baugh**	2,824	2024 2025 2026
8	Tony Green	2,590	1974 1975 1976 1977
9	La'Mical Perine	2,485	2016 2017 2018 2019
10	Jeff Demps	2,470	2008 2009 2010 2011

Single season
Rank	Player	Yards	Year
1	Emmitt Smith	1,599	1989
2	Emmitt Smith	1,341	1987
3	Jimmy DuBose	1,307	1975
4	Fred Taylor	1,292	1997
5	Errict Rhett	1,289	1993
6	Ciatrick Fason	1,267	2004
7	Jadan Baugh	1,170	2025
8	Mike Gillislee	1,152	2012
9	Errict Rhett	1,109	1991
10	Earnest Graham	1,085	2002

Single game
Rank	Player	Yards	Year	Opponent
1	Emmitt Smith	316	1989	New Mexico
2	Jadan Baugh	266	2025	Florida State
3	Emmitt Smith	224	1987	Alabama
4	Red Bethea	218	1930	Chicago
5	Ciatrick Fason	210	2004	Kentucky
6	Jimmy DuBose	204	1975	Florida State
7	Emmitt Smith	202	1989	Vanderbilt
8	Chuck Hunsinger	199	1949	Furman
9	Neal Anderson	197	1982	Kentucky
	Kelvin Taylor	197	2014	Georgia

=== Rushing touchdowns ===
Career
Rank	Player	TDs	Years
1	Tim Tebow	57	2006 2007 2008 2009
2	Emmitt Smith	36	1987 1988 1989
3	Errict Rhett	34	1990 1991 1992 1993
4	Earnest Graham	33	1999 2000 2001 2002
5	Fred Taylor	31	1994 1995 1996 1997
	**Jadan Baugh**	31	2024 2025 2026
7	Neal Anderson	30	1982 1983 1984 1985
8	DeShawn Wynn	25	2003 2004 2005 2006
9	Buford Long	25	1950 1951 1952
10	Larry Smith	24	1966 1967 1968

Single season
Rank	Player	TDs	Year
1	Tim Tebow	23	2007
2	**Jadan Baugh**	16	2026
3	Buford Long	14	1952
	Emmitt Smith	14	1989
	Tim Tebow	14	2009
6	Emmitt Smith	13	1987
	Fred Taylor	13	1997
	Kelvin Taylor	13	2015
	Dameon Pierce	13	2021
10	Tommy Durrance	12	1969
	Tim Tebow	12	2008

Single game
Rank	Player	TDs	Year	Opponent
1	Tim Tebow	5	2007	South Carolina
	Trey Burton	5	2010	Kentucky
	Jadan Baugh	5	2024	Kentucky
4	Rammy Ramsdell	4	1915	Mercer
	Tommy Owens	4	1928	Mercer
	Fred Taylor	4	1997	Florida St.
	Jesse Palmer	4	2000	Kentucky

== Receiving ==
=== Receptions ===
Career
Rank	Player	Rec	Years
1	Andre Caldwell	185	2003 2004 2005 2006 2007
2	Carlos Alvarez	172	1969 1970 1971
3	Willie Jackson	162	1990 1991 1992 1993
4	Errict Rhett	153	1990 1991 1992 1993
5	Dallas Baker	151	2003 2004 2005 2006
6	Chris Doering	149	1992 1993 1994 1995
7	Ted Alston	142	1980 1981
8	Reche Caldwell	141	1999 2000 2001
9	Jabar Gaffney	138	2000 2001
10	Taylor Jacobs	133	1999 2000 2001 2002

Single season
Rank	Player	Rec	Year
1	Carlos Alvarez	88	1969
	Chad Jackson	88	2005
3	Reidel Anthony	72	1996
4	Jabar Gaffney	71	2000
	Taylor Jacobs	71	2002
6	Chris Doering	70	1995
	Travis McGriff	70	1998
	Kadarius Toney	70	2020
9	Aaron Hernandez	68	2009
10	Darrell Jackson	67	1999
	Jabar Gaffney	67	2001

Single game
Rank	Player	Rec	Year	Opponent
1	Carlos Alvarez	15	1969	Miami (FL)
	Demarcus Robinson	15	2014	Kentucky
3	Travis McGriff	13	1998	South Carolina
	Andre Caldwell	13	2007	Florida Atlantic
	Percy Harvin	13	2008	Ole Miss

=== Receiving yards ===
Career
Rank	Player	Yards	Years
1	Carlos Alvarez	2,563	1969 1970 1971
2	Jabar Gaffney	2,375	2000 2001
3	Andre Caldwell	2,349	2003 2004 2005 2006 2007
4	Reidel Anthony	2,274	1994 1995 1996
5	Jack Jackson	2,266	1992 1993 1994
6	Dallas Baker	2,236	2003 2004 2005 2006
7	Ike Hilliard	2,214	1994 1995 1996
8	Jacquez Green	2,181	1995 1996 1997
9	Willie Jackson	2,172	1990 1991 1992 1993
10	Chris Doering	2,107	1992 1993 1994 1995

Single season
Rank	Player	Yards	Year
1	Travis McGriff	1,357	1998
2	Carlos Alvarez	1,329	1969
3	Reidel Anthony	1,293	1996
4	Jabar Gaffney	1,191	2001
5	Jabar Gaffney	1,184	2000
6	Darrell Jackson	1,156	1999
7	Taylor Jacobs	1,088	2002
8	Reche Caldwell	1,059	2001
9	Chris Doering	1,045	1995
10	Jacquez Green	1,024	1997

Single game
Rank	Player	Yards	Year	Opponent
1	Taylor Jacobs	246	2002	UAB
2	Carlos Alvarez	237	1969	Miami (FL)
3	Travis McGriff	222	1998	South Carolina
4	Demarcus Robinson	216	2014	Kentucky
5	Travis McGriff	213	1998	Alabama
6	Chris Doering	199	1993	Mississippi State
7	Reidel Anthony	193	1996	Florida State
8	Ike Hilliard	192	1995	Florida State
9	Reidel Anthony	189	1996	Arkansas
10	Wes Chandler	187	1976	North Carolina

=== Receiving touchdowns ===
Career
Rank	Player	TDs	Years
1	Chris Doering	31	1992 1993 1994 1995
2	Ike Hilliard	29	1994 1995 1996
3	Jack Jackson	29	1992 1993 1994
4	Jabar Gaffney	27	2000 2001
5	Reidel Anthony	26	1994 1995 1996
6	Willie Jackson	24	1990 1991 1992 1993
7	Jacquez Green	23	1995 1996 1997
8	Wes Chandler	22	1974 1975 1976 1977
9	Dallas Baker	21	2003 2004 2005 2006
10	Carlos Alvarez	19	1969 1970 1971

Single season
Rank	Player	TDs	Year
1	Reidel Anthony	18	1996
2	Chris Doering	17	1995
3	Jack Jackson	15	1994
4	Ike Hilliard	15	1995
5	Jabar Gaffney	14	2000
6	Jabar Gaffney	13	2001
7	Carlos Alvarez	12	1969
	Kyle Pitts	12	2020
9	Jack Jackson	11	1993

Single game
Rank	Player	TDs	Year	Opponent
1	Jack Jackson	4	1994	New Mexico State
	Ike Hilliard	4	1995	Tennessee
	Kyle Pitts	4	2020	Ole Miss

== Total offense ==
Total offense is the sum of passing and rushing statistics. It does not include receiving or returns.

=== Total offense yards ===
Career
Rank	Player	Yards	Years
1	Tim Tebow	12,232	2006 2007 2008 2009
2	Chris Leak	11,350	2003 2004 2005 2006
3	Danny Wuerffel	10,500	1993 1994 1995 1996
4	Shane Matthews	9,241	1989 1990 1991 1992
5	Rex Grossman	9,031	2000 2001 2002
6	Kyle Trask	7,440	2018 2019 2020
7	John Reaves	7,283	1969 1970 1971
8	Kerwin Bell	7,032	1984 1985 1986 1987
9	Wayne Peace	6,946	1980 1981 1982 1983
10	Doug Johnson	6,765	1996 1997 1998 1999

Single season
Rank	Player	Yards	Year
1	Kyle Trask	4,333	2020
2	Tim Tebow	4,181	2007
3	Rex Grossman	3,904	2001
4	Tim Tebow	3,805	2009
5	Danny Wuerffel	3,525	1996
6	Tim Tebow	3,805	2008
7	Emory Jones	3,493	2021
8	Rex Grossman	3,337	2002
9	Chris Leak	3,276	2004
10	Anthony Richardson	3,203	2022

Single game
Rank	Player	Yards	Year	Opponent
1	Emory Jones	550	2021	Samford
2	Tim Tebow	533	2009	Cincinnati (Sugar Bowl)
3	Anthony Richardson	515	2022	Tennessee
4	DJ Lagway	472	2024	Samford
5	Kyle Trask	469	2020	Georgia
6	Danny Wuerffel	466	1996	Arkansas
7	Rex Grossman	463	2001	LSU
8	Eric Kresser	460	1995	Northern Illinois
9	Kyle Trask	446	2020	LSU
10	Doug Johnson	442	1998	Vanderbilt

=== Touchdowns responsible for ===
"Touchdowns responsible for" is the official NCAA term for combined passing and rushing touchdowns.

Career
Rank	Player	TDs	Years
1	Tim Tebow	145	2006 2007 2008 2009
2	Danny Wuerffel	122	1993 1994 1995 1996
3	Chris Leak	101	2003 2004 2005 2006
4	Rex Grossman	83	2000 2001 2002
5	Shane Matthews	81	1989 1990 1991 1992
6	Kyle Trask	77	2018 2019 2020
7	Doug Johnson	64	1996 1997 1998 1999
8	Kerwin Bell	60	1984 1985 1986 1987
9	John Reaves	59	1969 1970 1971
10	Feleipe Franks	46	2017 2018 2019

Single season
Rank	Player	TDs	Year
1	Tim Tebow	55	2007
2	Kyle Trask	46	2020
3	Tim Tebow	42	2008
4	Danny Wuerffel	41	1996
5	Rex Grossman	39	2001
6	Danny Wuerffel	37	1995
7	Tim Tebow	35	2009
8	Chris Leak	31	2004
	Feleipe Franks	31	2018
10	Shane Matthews	29	1991
	Kyle Trask	29	2019

Single game
Rank	Player	TDs	Year	Opponent
1	Terry Dean	7	1994	New Mexico State
	Danny Wuerffel	7	1995	Tennessee
	Doug Johnson	7	1997	Central Michigan
	Tim Tebow	7	2007	South Carolina
	Emory Jones	7	2021	Samford
6	Terry Dean	6	1993	Southwestern Louisiana
	Eric Kresser	6	1995	Northern Illinois
	Danny Wuerffel	6	1996	Alabama
	Chris Leak	6	2004	South Carolina
	Trey Burton	6	2010	Kentucky
	Kyle Trask	6	2020	Ole Miss, Arkansas

== Defense ==
=== Interceptions ===
Career
Rank	Player	Ints	Years
1	Fred Weary	15	1994 1995 1996 1997
2	Teako Brown	14	1995 1996 1997 1998
3	Will White	14	1989 1990 1991 1992
4	Ahmad Black	13	2007 2008 2009 2010
5	Bruce Bennett	13	1963 1964 1965
6	Keiwan Ratliff	12	2000 2001 2002 2003
7	Louis Oliver	11	1985 1986 1987 1988
8	Wayne Fields	11	1972 1973 1974
9	Steve Tannen	11	1967 1968 1969
10	Walter Mayberry	11	1935 1936 1937

Single season
Rank	Player	Ints	Year
1	Keiwan Ratliff	9	2003
2	Ryan Smith	8	2006
3	John Clifford	7	1970
4	Randy Talbot	7	1974
5	Will White	7	1990
6	Ahmad Black	7	2008

Single game
Rank	Player	Ints	Year	Opponent
1	Joe Brodsky	3	1956	Mississippi State
	Bruce Bennett	3	1963	Georgia
	John Clifford	3	1970	North Carolina State
	Will White	3	1990	Alabama
	Keiwan Ratliff	3	2003	Arkansas

=== Tackles ===
Career
Rank	Player	Tackles	Years
1	David Little	475	1977 1978 1979 1980
2	Scot Brantley	467	1976 1977 1978 1979
3	Sammy Green	457	1972 1973 1974 1975
4	Charlie Williams	409	1974 1975 1976 1977
5	Ed Robinson	363	1990 1991 1992 1993
6	Ralph Ortega	357	1972 1973 1974
7	Fernando Jackson	353	1979 1980 1981 1982
8	Robin Fisher	348	1978 1979 1980 1981
9	Wilber Marshall	343	1980 1981 1982 1983
10	Alonzo Johnson	335	1981 1982 1983 1984 1985

Single season
Rank	Player	Tackles	Year
1	Sammy Green	202	1976
2	Scot Brantley	193	1978
3	Glenn Cameron	185	1974
4	Bam Hardmon	168	2002
5	David Little	161	1980
6	Charlie Williams	153	1977
7	Scot Brantley	145	1976
8	Carlton Miles	142	1992

=== Sacks ===
Career
Rank	Player	Sacks	Years
1	Alex Brown	33.0	1998 1999 2000 2001
2	Alonzo Johnson	27.0	1981 1982 1983 1984 1985
3	Huey Richardson	26.5	1987 1988 1989 1990
4	Clifford Charlton	25.0	1984 1985 1986 1987
5	Wilber Marshall	23.0	1980 1981 1982 1983
6	Kevin Carter	21.5	1991 1992 1993 1994
7	David Galloway	21.0	1977 1978 1979 1980 1981
8	Robin Fisher	21.0	1978 1979 1980 1981
9	Derrick Harvey	20.5	2005 2006 2007
10	Carlos Dunlap	19.5	2007 2008 2009

Single season
Rank	Player	Sacks	Year
1	Alex Brown	13.0	1999
2	Huey Richardson	12.5	1989
3	Alonzo Johnson	12.0	1985
4	Kevin Carter	11.5	1994
5	Wilber Marshall	11.0	1981
	Alonzo Johnson	11.0	1984
	Clifford Charlton	11.0	1986
	Derrick Harvey	11.0	2006
	Jachai Polite	11.0	2018
10	Alex Brown	10.5	2001

== Kicking ==
=== Field goals made ===
Career
Rank	Player	FGs	Years
1	Caleb Sturgis	70	2008 2009 2010 2011 2012
2	Jeff Chandler	67	1997 1998 1999 2000 2001
3	Trey Smack	53	2023 2024 2025
4	Evan McPherson	51	2018 2019 2020
5	Brian Clark	43	1979 1980 1981
	Bobby Raymond	43	1983 1984
	Matt Leach	43	2001 2002 2003 2004
8	Eddy Piñeiro	38	2016 2017
9	David Posey	33	1973 1974 1975 1976
	Arden Czyzewski	33	1988 1989 1990 1991

Single season
Rank	Player	FGs	Year
1	Caleb Sturgis	24	2012
2	Bobby Raymond	23	1984
3	Caleb Sturgis	22	2009
	Caleb Sturgis	22	2011
5	Jeff Chandler	21	1999
	Matt Leach	21	2003
	Eddy Piñeiro	21	2016
8	Bobby Raymond	20	1983
9	Jeff Chandler	19	2001
10	Brian Clark	18	1981
	Trey Smack	18	2024
	Trey Smack	18	2025

Single game
Rank	Player	FGs	Year	Opponent
1	Bobby Raymond	6	1983	Florida State
	Bobby Raymond	6	1984	Kentucky
3	Brian Clark	5	1980	Ole Miss
	Eddy Piñeiro	5	2017	UAB
	Trey Smack	5	2023	Charlotte

=== Field goal percentage ===
Career
Rank	Player	FG%	Years
1	Eddy Piñeiro	88.4%	2016 2017
2	Bobby Raymond	87.8%	1983 1984
3	Evan McPherson	85.0%	2018 2019 2020
4	Jeff Chandler	83.8%	1997 1998 1999 2000 2001
5	Berj Yepremian	82.9%	1976 1977 1978
6	Trey Smack	82.8%	2023 2024 2025
7	Judd Davis	82.1%	1992 1993 1994
8	Francisco Velez	81.8%	2013 2014
9	Caleb Sturgis	79.5%	2008 2009 2010 2011 2012
10	Jeff Dawson	78.9%	1985 1986

Single season
Rank	Player	FG%	Year
1	Eddy Piñeiro	94.4%	2017
2	Jonathan Phillips	92.3%	2008
3	Evan McPherson	89.5%	2018
	Evan McPherson	89.5%	2019
5	Bobby Raymond	88.5%	1984
6	Jeff Chandler	87.5%	1999
7	Bobby Raymond	87.0%	1983
8	Jeff Chandler	86.4%	2001
9	Caleb Sturgis	85.7%	2012
	Francisco Velez	85.7%	2014
	Trey Smack	85.7%	2024
