= 2006 Outback Bowl =

- 20th Outback Bowl
Iowa Hawkeyes	Florida Gators
(7–4)	(8–3)
Big Ten	SEC
24	31
Head coach: Kirk Ferentz	Head coach: Urban Meyer
AP / Coaches / BCS; 25 / 25 / NR	AP / Coaches / BCS; 16 / 18 / 17
	1	2	3	4	Total
Iowa	0	7	0	17	24
Florida	7	17	7	0	31
- Date: January 2, 2006
- Season: 2005
- Stadium: Raymond James Stadium
- Location: Tampa, Florida
- Referee: Barry Anderson (C–USA)
- Attendance: 65,881

United States TV coverage
- Network: ESPN
- Announcers: Mark Jones, Chris Spielman, Rob Stone

The 2006 Outback Bowl was an American college football bowl game played January 2, 2006, at Raymond James Stadium in Tampa, Florida. It was the 20th edition of the Outback Bowl and featured the Iowa Hawkeyes of the Big Ten Conference, and the Florida Gators from the Southeastern Conference (SEC). Florida came into the game under first-year head coach Urban Meyer with an 8–3 record. The Hawkeyes, led by 7th year head coach Kirk Ferentz, came into the game with a 7–4 record.

== Teams ==
The 2006 Outback Bowl was the third all-time meeting between the two programs. Florida won the 1983 Gator Bowl 14-6 over the Hawkeyes, and Iowa defeated the Gators 37-17 in the 2004 Outback Bowl.

== Game summary ==
Florida got on the board first, only 2 minutes into the game, when Tremaine McCollum blocked an Iowa punt, and returned it 6 yards for a touchdown. That was the only scoring of the first quarter. In the second quarter, Iowa stopped Florida inside its own five yard line, but Florida got a field goal from kicker Chris Hetland, to go up 10-0. With 1:57 left in the half, and Iowa driving, Iowa quarterback Drew Tate was intercepted by cornerback Vernell Brown, who returned it 60 yards for a touchdown, and a 17-0 lead.

Iowa came right back though, as quarterback Drew Tate found wide receiver Clinton Solomon for a 20 yard touchdown pass, to trim the lead to 17-7 with 1:10 to go in the half. It was enough time for Florida however, as Florida scored its first offensive touchdown of the game. Quarterback Chris Leak found wide receiver Dallas Baker for a 24 yard touchdown pass with 1 second left in the half, as Florida took a 24-7 lead into the locker room.

With 5:23 left in the third quarter, Florida seemingly put the game away, with a 38 yard touchdown pass from Leak to Baker, to put Florida up 31-7, but Iowa would come back. Early in the fourth quarter, Drew Tate found wide receiver Ed Hinkel for a 4 yard touchdown pass to trim the margin to 31-14. With less than 7 minutes to play, Tate again found Hinkel, this time for a 14 yard touchdown pass, as Iowa drew within 31-21. Iowa stopped Florida once again, and got the ball back.

With 1:24 left in the game, Kirk Ferentz decided to kick a field goal, since they were down 2 possessions anyway. Kyle Schlicher kicked a 45 yard field goal, to make it a one possession game. His onside kick attempt was recovered by Iowa, but Iowa was controversially flagged for being offside, and Florida regained possession on the subsequent attempt. The game was noted for its extremely controversial calls leading to allegations that Florida bribed the officials.

=== Scoring summary ===
Scoring summary

Quarter	Time	Drive			Team	Scoring information	Score	
Quarter	Time	Plays	Yards	TOP	Team	Scoring information	IOWA	UF
1	13:25				UF	Blocked punt returned 6 yards for touchdown by Tremaine McCollum, Chris Hetland kick good	0	7
2	9:31	15	53	7:23	UF	21-yard field goal by Chris Hetland	0	10
2	1:57				UF	Interception returned 41 yards for touchdown by Vernell Brown, Chris Hetland kick good	0	17
2	1:10	5	39	0:37	IOWA	Clinton Solomon 20-yard touchdown reception from Drew Tate, Kyle Schlicher kick good	7	17
2	0:01	8	80	1:09	UF	Dallas Baker 26-yard touchdown reception from Chris Leak, Chris Hetland kick good	7	24
3	5:23	7	80	2:49	UF	Dallas Baker 38-yard touchdown reception from Chris Leak, Chris Hetland kick good	7	31
4	13:51	3	5	0:54	IOWA	Ed Hinkel 4-yard touchdown reception from Drew Tate, Kyle Schlicher kick good	14	31
4	6:59	9	73	1:46	IOWA	Ed Hinkel 13-yard touchdown reception from Drew Tate, Kyle Schlicher kick good	21	31
4	1:24	9	41	1:11	IOWA	45-yard field goal by Kyle Schlicher	24	31
"TOP" = time of possession. For other American football terms, see Glossary of American football.							24	31

=== Team statistics ===
Statistics	IOWA	UF
1st downs	23	26
Total yards	410	447
Passing yards	346	278
Rushing yards	64	169
Penalties	8-60	0
3rd down conversions	9-18	9-18
4th down conversions	0-0	1-3
Turnovers	1	1
Time of Possession	24:35	35:25
