= Chris Leak =

American gridiron football player and coach (born 1985)

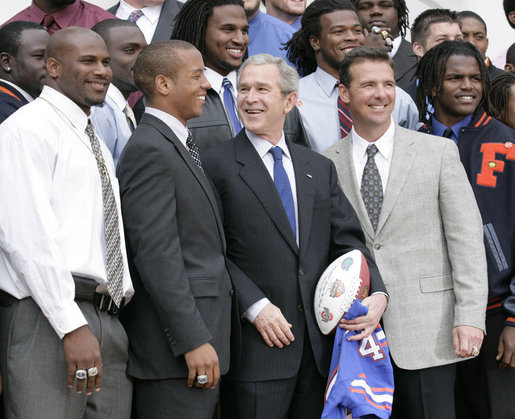
- Leak (second from left) and teammates visit President George W. Bush at the White House in 2007

No. 12
- Position: Quarterback

Personal information
- Born: May 3, 1985 (age 41); Charlotte, North Carolina, U.S.
- Listed height: 6 ft 0 in (1.83 m)
- Listed weight: 215 lb (98 kg)

Career information
- High school: Independence (Charlotte)
- College: Florida (2003–2006)
- NFL draft: 2007: undrafted

Career history

Playing
- Chicago Bears (2007)*; Hamilton Tiger-Cats (2008); Montreal Alouettes (2008–2010); Saskatchewan Roughriders (2011); Jacksonville Sharks (2012); Orlando Predators (2012)
- * Offseason or practice squad member only

Coaching
- Florida (2013) Graduate assistant; Florida (2014) Wide receivers coach; Edgewater HS (FL) (2016) Head coach

Awards and highlights
- As a player: 2× Grey Cup champion (2009, 2010); BCS national champion (2006); 3× Second-team All-SEC (2004–2006); SEC Freshman of the Year (2003)

Career AFL statistics
- Passing attempts: 405
- Passing completions: 266
- Completion percentage: 65.7%
- TD–INT: 60–15
- Passing yards: 2,989
- Stats at ArenaFan.com

Christopher Patrick Leak (born May 3, 1985) is an American former professional football quarterback who played in the National Football League (NFL) for a season with the Chicago Bears. He played college football for the University of Florida, and led the Florida Gators to victory in the 2007 BCS National Championship Game. Leak also played professionally for the Hamilton Tiger-Cats and Montreal Alouettes of the Canadian Football League (CFL) and the Jacksonville Sharks and Orlando Predators of the Arena Football League (AFL).

== Early life ==
Leak was born in Charlotte, North Carolina, in 1985. Leak received national attention as an 8th grader in 1998 when Wake Forest coach Jim Caldwell, who had just signed his older brother, C. J., offered him a college football scholarship. He attended Independence High School in Charlotte, where he played for the Independence Patriots high school football team. In four years as the Patriots' starting quarterback, Leak led his team to three consecutive North Carolina state championships, winning two in 4A and one in 4AA. He set North Carolina state records for passing yards in a career (15,593) and completions in a career (1,013), as well as the national record for touchdown passes in a career (185). He is considered by some to be the greatest high school quarterback of all time. He was recognized as a Parade magazine All-American as well as Parade's Player of the Year in 2003. The Scout.com recruiting service ranked Leak as a five-star prospect and the third-best quarterback in the 2003 recruiting class.

== College career ==
Leak accepted an athletic scholarship to attend the University of Florida in Gainesville, Florida, where he played for coach Ron Zook and coach Urban Meyer's Florida Gators football teams from 2003 to 2006. Leak was known for his quiet leadership as a quarterback, and was elected a team captain by his teammates two of his four years as a Gator.

Leak began his career at Florida as a freshman, seeing playing time in the first few games, and taking over as the starter in the game against the Kentucky Wildcats. Leak finished his freshman year with a Southeastern Conference (SEC) record for a freshman, posting a 6–3 record as a starter, including wins over the eventual national champion LSU Tigers and the rival Georgia Bulldogs. Leak was named to the SEC All-Freshman Team and Rivals.com's Freshman All-America Team.

During his sophomore season in 2004, Leak's quarterback skills progressed, transforming him into one of the notable quarterbacks in college football. He started all of Florida's games, including a memorable school record-tying six-touchdown performance against the South Carolina Gamecocks. However, following a disappointing loss to the unranked Mississippi State Bulldogs and an on-campus confrontation with fraternity members, head coach Ron Zook was fired. After Zook was fired, Leak was rumored to be considering a transfer.

In December 2004, Urban Meyer replaced Ron Zook as Florida's head coach and introduced Meyer's spread offense to the Gators. Dan Mullen was introduced as the new offensive coordinator—Leak's third offensive coordinator in three years. Heading into his 2005 junior season, Leak had to learn his third offensive scheme in as many years, but was touted as a possible Heisman Trophy candidate. Leak won his first five games, including a big win over the SEC East rival Tennessee Volunteers, but struggled in the option portion of Meyer's offense. Since Leak was a drop-back passer and not the ideal choice to run Meyer's spread option offense, Meyer tweaked the offense to tailor it to Leak's abilities after the Gators struggled midway through its schedule. The result was successful with the team winning its last two games against ranked competition. Leak received second-team All-SEC honors.

Before the beginning of his 2006 senior season, there was speculation that Leak might not be the Gators' starting quarterback due to the emergence of talented freshman Tim Tebow. Instead, Meyer publicly endorsed Leak as the starting quarterback and confirmed Tim Tebow would be the back-up. Preseason analysis projected that Florida would have the hardest schedule in the country, including back-to-back games against Tennessee, Kentucky, Alabama, LSU, Auburn and Georgia. The 2006 season proved to be a redemption year for Leak: leading the Gators to their first SEC Championship since 2000, and a spot in the 2007 BCS National Championship Game against the Ohio State Buckeyes (the Gators' first championship game appearance since 1996). Leak also broke many Gators' passing records set by Heisman Trophy-winner Danny Wuerffel, including Wuerffel's record for career passing yards set during the 2006 SEC championship game. Leak again received second-team All-SEC honors.

Leak led the Florida Gators to their second consensus national championship with a 41–14 victory over the Ohio State Buckeyes on January 8, 2007, taking home the offensive Most Valuable Player (MVP) award for the game. His performance was solid throughout the BCS championship game, completing his first nine passes at the start of the game, and finishing with twenty-five completions in thirty-six attempts for 213 yards and one touchdown.

Leak was listed on the SEC Academic Honor Roll each year he attended Florida, and was a finalist for the Draddy Trophy, also known as the "Academic Heisman" for college football players. He graduated from the University of Florida with a bachelor's degree in sociology, with honors, in December 2006, and was a keynote speaker during the graduation ceremony.

Leak is remembered for volunteering with children in the Goodwill Gators Program, encouraging them to put school first and avoid drug use. At home in Charlotte, North Carolina, he also worked with the Boys and Girls Club and the Steele Creek Youth Athletic Association, served as an inspirational speaker with the Fellowship of Christian Athletes, and spoke at area middle schools encouraging students to stay focused on their goals.

=== College statistics ===
Year	Team	Passing								Rushing			
Year	Team	Cmp	Att	Pct	Yds	Y/A	TD	Int	Rtg	Att	Yds	Avg	TD
2003	Florida	190	320	59.4	2,435	7.6	16	11	132.9	68	–53	–0.8	2
2004	Florida	238	399	59.6	3,197	8.0	29	12	144.9	61	79	1.3	2
2005	Florida	235	374	62.8	2,639	7.1	20	6	136.5	105	81	0.8	6
2006	Florida	232	365	63.6	2,942	8.1	23	13	144.9	77	30	0.4	3
Career		895	1,458	61.4	11,213	7.7	88	42	140.1	311	137	0.4	13

== Professional career ==
Pre-draft measurables
Height	Weight	Arm length	Hand span	40-yard dash	10-yard split	20-yard split	20-yard shuttle	Three-cone drill	Vertical jump	Broad jump
5 ft 11 7/8 in (1.83 m)	209 lb (95 kg)	31 3/4 in (0.81 m)	9 1/2 in (0.24 m)	4.79 s	1.66 s	2.71 s	4.41 s	7.03 s	32.5 in (0.83 m)	9 ft 5 in (2.87 m)
All values from NFL Combine

=== NFL ===
Leak was not selected during the 2007 NFL draft. The Chicago Bears signed him immediately after the draft. He spent the summer of 2007 working with the team, and training under former Gator quarterback Rex Grossman. However, Leak only saw playtime during the final game of the preseason, where he completed eleven of sixteen passes for 88 yards, an interception and a touchdown. He was eventually cut from the Bears' roster on September 16, 2007.

For the 2008 season, Leak tried out with the Kansas City Chiefs.

=== AAFL ===
In November 2007, Leak announced his intentions to play for Team Florida in the All American Football League. He was later drafted in the 6th round by Team Florida. Lacking start-up capital and with low ticket sales, the AAFL's first season was postponed until 2009 (and later canceled). Leak, like all AAFL players, was released from his contract.

=== CFL ===
On June 3, 2008, Leak signed with the Hamilton Tiger-Cats of the Canadian Football League. He was claimed by the Montreal Alouettes on June 9 after being released a day earlier. With backup quarterback Adrian McPherson injured, Leak was on the active roster for the August 21, 2009, match against the Saskatchewan Roughriders, in which he threw his first CFL touchdown pass on his first play. The Montreal Alouettes went on to win the Grey Cup in 2009.

On August 19, 2010, in a game against the Winnipeg Blue Bombers, Montreal starting quarterback, Anthony Calvillo, got taken out with an injury which gave way to Leak to finish off the game. Leak would lead the Alouettes to a 39–17 win over the Bombers. Leak made his first CFL start at quarterback on September 3, 2010, against the BC Lions. However, he was on the short end of a 38–17 score, going 15-for-27 for 135 yards with two interceptions and a fumble. Leak suffered an apparent injury early in the fourth quarter and did not return. The Montreal Alouettes went on to win the Grey Cup in 2010.

On May 5, 2011, Leak signed with the Saskatchewan Roughriders as a free agent. On June 25, 2011, Leak was cut from the Roughriders.

=== AFL ===
On September 26, 2011, Leak signed with the ArenaBowl XXIV champion Jacksonville Sharks, replacing star quarterback Aaron Garcia, who joined the San Antonio Talons for the 2012 Arena Football League season. In his only game with the Sharks, Leak completed 21-of-31 passes for 196 yards and five touchdowns in a 52–28 victory over the Kansas City Command. After it was announced that Garcia's former backup, Omar Jacobs, would start the next game, Leak was suspended after skipping the following team practice. On April 10, 2012, he was placed on the left squad list, effectively ending his time with the Sharks. On April 23, 2012, Leak signed with the Orlando Predators, where he was their starting quarterback for reminder of the 2012 season. While with Orlando in 2012, Leak threw for 2,793 yards, 55 touchdowns and 14 interceptions. He also had two rushing touchdowns.

== Post-playing career ==
Leak worked as a host on SiriusXM College Sports Coast-to-Coast multiple nights each week during the 2012 college football season, along with co-host Chris Childers.

Florida Gators head coach Will Muschamp added Leak as a quality control coach in May 2013. Leak became a graduate assistant, helping coach the team's offense. Leak was promoted to the position of wide receivers coach in May 2014.

Leak worked in football development and youth outreach for the Tampa Bay Buccaneers in 2015. He was hired as the head coach of the football team at Edgewater High School in Orlando, Florida, in February 2016. Following an 0–5 start, Leak resigned on October 4, 2016. The next day, it was reported that Leak was under investigation by the Orlando Police Department for possible sexual assault of a minor. The police later confirmed their investigation and provided their report to Deadspin. Later that same month, the 16-year-old victim declined to press charges and the investigation was closed.

In 2017, Leak founded Air Strike Passing Academy, a quarterback development program. He currently lives in Orlando, Florida.

== See also ==
- List of Chicago Bears players
- List of University of Florida alumni
