= 2005 Florida Gators football team =

American college football season

2005 Florida Gators football

Outback Bowl champion

Outback Bowl, W 31–24 vs. Iowa
- Conference: Southeastern Conference
- Eastern Division

Ranking
- Coaches: No. 16
- AP: No. 12
- Record: 9–3 (5–3 SEC)
- Head coach: Urban Meyer (1st season)
- Offensive coordinator: Dan Mullen (1st season)
- Offensive scheme: Spread
- Co-defensive coordinators: Greg Mattison (1st season); Charlie Strong (3rd season)
- Base defense: 4–3
- Captains: Vernell Brown; Mike Degory; Jarvis Herring; Chris Leak; Jeremy Mincey
- Home stadium: Ben Hill Griffin Stadium

2005 Southeastern Conference football standings
	Conf.			Overall
Team	W		L	W		L
Eastern Division
No. 10 Georgia x$	6	–	2	10	–	3
South Carolina	5	–	3	7	–	5
No. 12 Florida	5	–	3	9	–	3
Vanderbilt	3	–	5	5	–	6
Tennessee	3	–	5	5	–	6
Kentucky	2	–	6	3	–	8
Western Division
No. 5 LSU xy	7	–	1	11	–	2
No. 14 Auburn x	7	–	1	9	–	3
No. 8 Alabama	6	–	2	10	–	2
Arkansas	2	–	6	4	–	7
Mississippi State	1	–	7	3	–	8
Ole Miss	1	–	7	3	–	8
Championship: Georgia 34, LSU 14
$ – BCS representative as conference champion; x – Division champion/co-champions; y – Championship game participant; Alabama had all victories vacated by the NCAA in 2010. As such, the official record for Alabama is 0–2 (0–2).; Rankings from AP Poll

The 2005 Florida Gators football team represented the University of Florida as a member of the Eastern Division in the Southeastern Conference (SEC) during the 2005 NCAA Division I-A football season. Led by first-year head Urban Meyer, the Gators compiled an overall record of 9–3 with mark of 5–3 in conference play, tying for second place in the SEC's Eastern Division. Florida was invited to the Outback Bowl, where the Gators defeated Iowa. The team played home games at Ben Hill Griffin Stadium on the university's Gainesville, Florida campus.

== Schedule ==
Date	Opponent	Rank	Site	TV	Result	Attendance
September 3	Wyoming*	No. 10	Ben Hill Griffin Stadium; Gainesville, FL	PPV	W 32–14	90,707
September 10	Louisiana Tech*	No. 10	Ben Hill Griffin Stadium; Gainesville, FL	PPV	W 41–3	90,099
September 17	No. 5 Tennessee	No. 6	Ben Hill Griffin Stadium; Gainesville, FL (rivalry)	CBS	W 16–7	90,716
September 24	at Kentucky	No. 5	Commonwealth Stadium; Lexington, KY (rivalry)	CBS	W 49–28	66,820
October 1	at No. 15 Alabama	No. 5	Bryant–Denny Stadium; Tuscaloosa, AL (rivalry)	CBS	L 3–31	81,018
October 8	Mississippi State	No. 13	Ben Hill Griffin Stadium; Gainesville, FL	JPS	W 35–9	90,104
October 15	at No. 10 LSU	No. 11	Tiger Stadium; Baton Rouge, LA (rivalry)	CBS	L 17–21	92,402
October 29	vs. No. 4 Georgia	No. 16	Alltel Stadium; Jacksonville, FL (rivalry, College GameDay)	CBS	W 14–10	84,501
November 5	Vanderbilt^{†}	No. 13	Ben Hill Griffin Stadium; Gainesville, FL	ESPN2	W 49–42 ^{2OT}	90,140
November 12	at South Carolina	No. 12	Williams–Brice Stadium; Columbia, SC	JPS	L 22–30	83,421
November 26	No. 23 Florida State*	No. 19	Ben Hill Griffin Stadium; Gainesville, FL (rivalry)	CBS	W 34–7	90,669
January 2, 2006	vs. No. 25 Iowa*	No. 16	Raymond James Stadium; Tampa, FL (Outback Bowl)	ESPN	W 31–24	65,881
*Non-conference game; ^{†}Homecoming; Rankings from AP Poll released prior to the game

== Rankings ==
Ranking movements Legend: ██ Increase in ranking ██ Decrease in ranking т = Tied with team above or below
	Week															
Poll	Pre	1	2	3	4	5	6	7	8	9	10	11	12	13	14	Final
AP	10	10	6	5	5	13	11	18	16	13	12	20	19	17	16	12
Coaches	11	10	7	5	5	15	13	19	18	15	12	20	19	18	18	16
Harris	Not released				4	14	12	19	17	15	13	20	19	18	17т	Not released
BCS	Not released							20	19	16	13	22	23	17	17	Not released

== Game summaries ==
=== Wyoming ===
	1	2	3	4	Total
Cowboys	0	0	7	7	14
Gators	7	10	9	6	32

=== Louisiana Tech ===
	1	2	3	4	Total
Bulldogs	0	3	0	0	3
Gators	7	14	13	7	41

=== Tennessee ===
	1	2	3	4	Total
Volunteers	0	7	0	0	7
Gators	7	0	6	3	16

=== Kentucky ===
	1	2	3	4	Total
Gators	14	35	0	0	49
Wildcats	7	0	7	14	28

=== Alabama ===
	1	2	3	4	Total
Gators	0	3	0	0	3
Crimson Tide	17	7	7	0	31

=== Mississippi State ===
	1	2	3	4	Total
Bulldogs	3	0	6	0	9
Gators	3	9	9	14	35

=== LSU ===
	1	2	3	4	Total
Gators	0	7	10	0	17
Tigers	14	0	0	7	21

=== Georgia ===
	1	2	3	4	Total
Bulldogs	0	3	7	0	10
Gators	14	0	0	0	14

=== Vanderbilt ===
	1	2	3	4	OT	2OT	Total
Commodores	7	7	0	21	7	0	42
Gators	7	7	14	7	7	7	49

=== South Carolina ===
	1	2	3	4	Total
Gators	3	9	7	3	22
Gamecocks	7	13	7	3	30

=== Florida State ===
	1	2	3	4	Total
Seminoles	0	0	0	7	7
Gators	0	14	3	17	34

=== Iowa ===
Outback Bowl

	1	2	3	4	Total
Hawks	0	7	0	17	24
Gators	7	17	7	0	31

== Coaching staff ==
- Urban Meyer – Head coach – first year at UF
- Steve Addazio – Tackles/tight ends – first year
- Stan Drayton – Running backs – first year
- Billy Gonzales – Wide receivers – first year
- Chuck Heater – Recruiting coordinator/cornerbacks – first year
- John Hevesy – Centers/guards – 0 years
- John "Doc" Holliday – Associate head coach/safeties – first year
- Greg Mattison – Co-defensive coordinator/defensive line – first year
- Dan Mullen – Offensive coordinator/quarterbacks – first year
- Charlie Strong – Assistant head coach/co-defensive coordinator/linebackers – sixth year

== Players drafted into the NFL ==
Round	Pick	Player	Position	NFL club
2	36	Chad Jackson	WR	New England Patriots
6	191	Jeremy Mincey	DE	New England Patriots
7	236	Dee Webb	CB	Jacksonville Jaguars

== Bibliography ==
- 2009 Southeastern Conference Football Media Guide, Florida Year-by-Year Records, Southeastern Conference, Birmingham, Alabama, p. 60 (2009).
- Carlson, Norm, University of Florida Football Vault: The History of the Florida Gators, Whitman Publishing, LLC, Atlanta, Georgia (2007). ISBN 0-7948-2298-3.
