= Doug Johnson (American football) =

American football player (born 1977)

No. 11, 12
- Position: Quarterback

Personal information
- Born: October 27, 1977 (age 49); Gainesville, Florida, U.S.
- Listed height: 6 ft 2 in (1.88 m)
- Listed weight: 218 lb (99 kg)

Career information
- High school: Buchholz (Gainesville)
- College: Florida
- NFL draft: 2000: undrafted

Career history
- Atlanta Falcons (2000–2003); Jacksonville Jaguars (2004)*; Tennessee Titans (2004); Cleveland Browns (2005)*; Cincinnati Bengals (2006)
- * Offseason or practice squad member only

Awards and highlights
- PFWA All-Rookie Team (2000); Bowl Alliance national champion (1996); Florida–Georgia Hall of Fame

Career NFL statistics
- Passing attempts: 384
- Passing completions: 218
- Completion percentage: 56.8%
- TD–INT: 13–18
- Passing yards: 2,600
- Passer rating: 69.4
- Stats at Pro Football Reference

Doug Johnson Jr. (born October 27, 1977) is an American former professional football player who was a quarterback for five seasons in the National Football League (NFL) during the early 2000s. Johnson played college football for the Florida Gators, and thereafter, he played professionally for the Atlanta Falcons, the Jacksonville Jaguars, the Cincinnati Bengals, the Cleveland Browns, and the Tennessee Titans of the NFL. He is in the Florida Georgia Hall of Fame, and played in minor league baseball for the Tampa Bay Rays organization.

== Early life ==
Johnson was born in Gainesville, Florida in 1977. He attended in Buchholz High School in Gainesville, where he was a stand-out high school football and baseball player for the Buchholz Bobcats.

== College career ==
Johnson accepted an athletic scholarship to attend the University of Florida in Gainesville, where he was a quarterback for coach Steve Spurrier's Gators teams from 1996 to 1999. Memorably, Johnson threw for 460 yards and seven touchdowns against the Central Michigan Chippewas in 1997, setting a Southeastern Conference (SEC) record for most touchdown passes in a game, and an NCAA Division I record for most touchdown passes in a half. In three seasons as the Gators' principal starter, he threw for 7,114 yards, sixty-two touchdowns and thirty-six interceptions, completing 504 of 907 attempts, and was selected as a team captain as a senior.

=== College statistics ===
Year	Team	Passing					
Year	Team	Cmp	Att	Pct	Yds	TD	Int
1997	Florida	148	269	55.0	2,023	21	12
1998	Florida	154	274	56.2	2,346	19	8
1999	Florida	190	337	56.4	2,574	20	13
Career		492	880	55.9	6,943	60	33

== Professional career ==
Pre-draft measurables
Height	Weight	Arm length	Hand span	40-yard dash	Vertical jump	Wonderlic
6 ft 2 3/8 in (1.89 m)	226 lb (103 kg)	30 1/2 in (0.77 m)	9 1/2 in (0.24 m)	4.95 s	29.5 in (0.75 m)	28
All values from NFL Combine

After graduating from Florida, Johnson was not selected in the 2000 NFL draft, but signed with the Atlanta Falcons as a free agent. As an Atlanta Falcon in 2002, Johnson led the team to a 17–10 victory in a start against the New York Giants. In the game, Johnson completed 19 of 25 passes for 257 yards and one passing and one rushing touchdown. In four seasons with the Falcons, he started eleven games and passed for 2,600 yards. He has since played three additional seasons, mostly as a back-up or practice squad quarterback for three different teams. On September 1, 2007, he was released by the Cincinnati Bengals after playing the preseason as a backup to Carson Palmer.

Johnson was also a second-round draft pick in 1996 for the Tampa Bay Devil Rays, playing as a third baseman in their minor league system in 1996 and 1997 before suffering a rotator cuff injury and leaving to concentrate on football full-time.

Football Outsiders uses the term called "the Doug Johnson Effect," referring to "part-time players who had a very good performance the previous season in only one or two games," as a caution against overvaluing NFL players for the next season.

== See also ==
- Florida Gators football, 1990–99
- History of the Atlanta Falcons
- List of University of Florida alumni
