= Urban Meyer =

American football coach (born 1964)

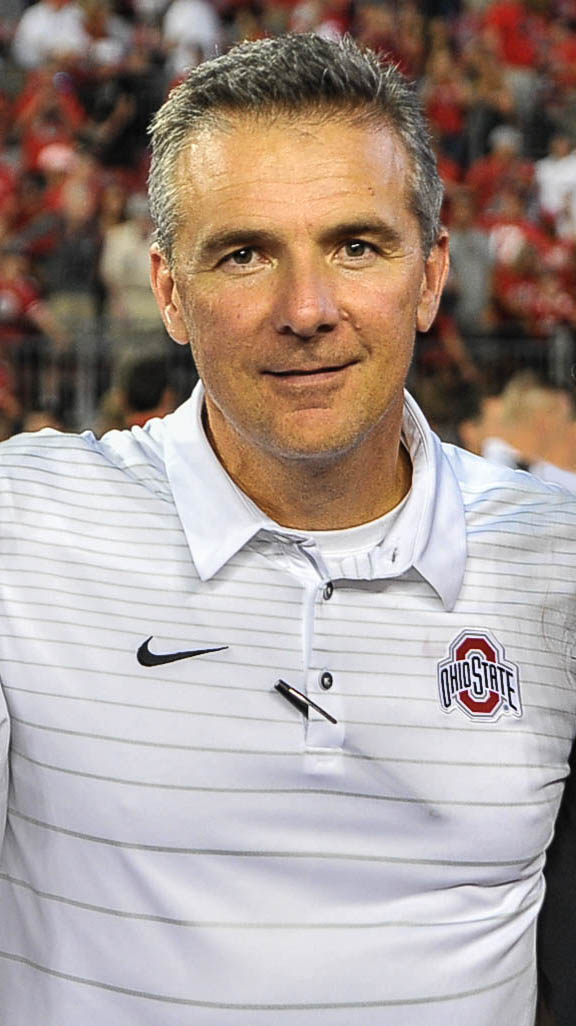
- Meyer in 2017

Biographical details
- Born: July 10, 1964 (age 62); Toledo, Ohio, U.S.
- Education: University of Cincinnati; Ohio State University

Playing career
- 1983–1984: Cincinnati
- Position: Defensive back

Coaching career (HC unless noted)
- 1985: St. Xavier (OH) (DB)
- 1986–1987: Ohio State (GA)
- 1988: Illinois State (OLB)
- 1989: Illinois State (QB/WR)
- 1990–1995: Colorado State (WR)
- 1996–2000: Notre Dame (WR)
- 2001–2002: Bowling Green
- 2003–2004: Utah
- 2005–2010: Florida
- 2012–2018: Ohio State
- 2021: Jacksonville Jaguars

Head coaching record
- Overall: NCAA: 187–32; NFL: 2–11
- Bowls: 12–3

Accomplishments and honors

Championships
- 3 National (2006, 2008, 2014); 2 MW (2003, 2004); 2 SEC (2006, 2008); 3 Big Ten (2014, 2017, 2018); 3 SEC East Division (2006, 2008, 2009); 2 Big Ten Leaders Division (2012, 2013); 3 Big Ten East Division (2014, 2017, 2018)

Awards
- 2× Woody Hayes Trophy (2004, 2012); Eddie Robinson Coach of the Year (2004); George Munger Award (2004); Home Depot Coach of the Year (2004); PFW National Coach of the Year (2004); Victor Award (2004); TSN National Coach of the Year (2003); SI Coach of the Decade (2009); TSN Coach of the Decade (2009); 2× MW Coach of the Year (2003, 2004); MAC Coach of the Year (2001)
- College Football Hall of Fame; Inducted in 2025 (profile)

Urban Frank Meyer III (born July 10, 1964) is an American sportscaster and former football coach. He spent most of his coaching career at the collegiate level, having served as the head coach of the Bowling Green Falcons from 2001 to 2002, the Utah Utes from 2003 to 2004, the Florida Gators from 2005 to 2010, and the Ohio State Buckeyes from 2012 to 2018. He retired from coaching in 2019 at the end of the Rose Bowl, and stayed at Ohio State as an assistant athletic director and was also an analyst for Fox Sports, appearing weekly on their Big Noon Kickoff pregame show. In 2021, Meyer came out of retirement to take his first National Football League (NFL) job as head coach of the Jacksonville Jaguars, but was fired 13 games into his first and only season, after going 2–11 and being involved in both on- and off-field controversies. He then went back to Fox Sports to resume his broadcasting career.

Meyer was born in Toledo, Ohio; grew up in Ashtabula, Ohio; and attended the University of Cincinnati, where he played football as a defensive back. While at the University of Florida, he coached the Gators to two BCS National Championship Game victories, during the 2006 and 2008 seasons. Meyer's winning percentage through the conclusion of the 2009 season (.842) was the highest among active coaches with a minimum of five full seasons at a Football Bowl Subdivision (FBS) program.

Following his temporary retirement in 2011, he worked as a college football analyst for the television sports network ESPN before joining Ohio State to become their head coach. In 2014, he led the Buckeyes to their first Big Ten Conference title under his tenure as well as the program's eighth national championship. Meyer is one of four coaches, along with Pop Warner, Howard Jones, and Nick Saban, to win a major college football national championship at two universities. Meyer was inducted into the College Football Hall of Fame in 2025.

== Early life ==
Meyer was born on July 10, 1964, in Toledo, Ohio, and was raised in Ashtabula, Ohio. He graduated from Ashtabula's Saint John High School in 1982.

Weeks after graduating high school, Meyer was selected in the 13th round of the 1982 Major League Baseball draft by the Atlanta Braves as a shortstop. He spent the '82 and '83 seasons playing in 44 minor league games in the Braves organization, before an arm injury ended his baseball career. He walked on as a defensive back at the University of Cincinnati in the autumn of 1983, lettering in 1984, before earning his bachelor's degree in psychology in 1986. During his undergraduate studies, Meyer was a member of Sigma Chi fraternity (Zeta Psi chapter).

Meyer earned his master's degree in sports administration in 1988 from Ohio State University.

== Coaching career ==
In 2004, Meyer was recognized as the college football coach of the year by both sportswriters (Eddie Robinson Coach of the Year) and television commentators (Home Depot Coach of the Year Award). He then had twenty years of college coaching experience, including nine as a head coach. His overall record as a head coach through the end of the 2009 season was 96–18, and he was 49–14 in conference play. His winning percentage (.842) through the end of the 2009 season ranked first nationally among active college football head coaches. By winning the 2009 BCS Championship game on January 8, 2009, Meyer moved past Oklahoma head coach Bob Stoops into second place on the list of active Division I coaches ranked by winning percentage.

Meyer is Catholic, and on several occasions has referred to the head coaching position at the University of Notre Dame as his "dream job", leading to speculation that he would someday wish to coach there. However, according to a July 2009 newspaper report, Meyer insisted he would never leave Florida for Notre Dame. And when the employment status of Irish coach Charlie Weis came into question in November 2009, Meyer held a press conference to dispel rumors linking him to the possible opening, stating that he would remain at Florida for "as long as they'll have me". The University of Cincinnati's Brian Kelly was eventually hired for the job.

On December 26, 2009, Meyer announced he would resign following the team's bowl game against Cincinnati, citing health concerns. However, the following day Meyer announced that he would instead take an indefinite leave of absence, and he resumed his coaching duties in time for the beginning of the Gators' spring practice on March 17, 2010.

Florida athletic director Jeremy Foley announced Meyer's resignation on December 8, 2010, but stated that Meyer would remain as the head coach through the Gators' appearance in the Outback Bowl on January 1, 2011.

On November 28, 2011, Meyer accepted the head coach position at Ohio State University.

=== Early coaching career ===
After playing as a defensive back and placeholder for the University of Cincinnati, Meyer spent one season interning as a defensive back coach at Saint Xavier High School in Cincinnati, Ohio in 1985, under the mentorship of legendary St. Xavier head coach Steve Rasso, where he met members of the Ohio State coaching staff. His first collegiate coaching position was a two-year stint as a graduate assistant coaching tight ends at Ohio State under head coach Earle Bruce. He spent the next thirteen years as an assistant—two at Illinois State, six at Colorado State, and five at Notre Dame.

One of the talents he coached at Colorado State was wide receiver Greg Primus (3,096 yards and 17 touchdowns in three years). He put up over 1,000 yards receiving from 1990 to 1992 under Meyer's tutelage. At Notre Dame, he coached wide receiver Bobby Brown who would finish his career with 1,521 yards and 12 receiving touchdowns. At Notre Dame in 2000, he coached wide receiver David Givens who would later be drafted by the New England Patriots.

In 1990, while still the linebacker coach at Illinois State, he called Toledo head coach Nick Saban's home and spoke to Saban's wife to inquire if a position was available. Saban, however, never returned the call. Saban later said "I was so kind of caught up and busy with what I was doing, I never really followed up on that. Obviously, that was a huge mistake on my part because the guy's a fantastic coach."

=== Bowling Green ===
In 2001, Meyer took his first head coaching job at Bowling Green. In his first season there, he engineered one of the greatest turnarounds in the NCAA football history, going 8–3 and capping off the season with a 56–21 victory over Bowling Green's rival, the University of Toledo Rockets. He also earned Mid-American Conference coach of the year honors. The next year, Bowling Green finished with a 9–3 record. After a 17–6 overall record, Meyer left for the University of Utah.

He helped turn around a team that had gone 2–9 in 2000 in large part due to quarterback Josh Harris, a player tailor-made for Meyer's scheme. In a part-time play in 2001, Harris passed for 1,022 yards with nine touchdowns and ran for 600 yards and eight touchdowns. The next year, he passed for 2,425 yards with 19 touchdowns and ran for 737 yards with 20 touchdowns. Meyer would later use such quarterbacks as Alex Smith and Tim Tebow in a fashion similar to the way Meyer used Harris.

=== Utah ===
After two seasons at Bowling Green, he took the job at Utah in 2003. In his first year there, Meyer was named the Mountain West Conference's Coach of the Year with a 10–2 record, the best ever for a coach's first season at Utah. He also earned honors as The Sporting News National Coach of the Year, the first Utes coach to do so. They also won the program's first outright conference championship since the 1957 team won the Skyline Conference title.

Meyer's success can be attributed to his unique offensive system, which is an offshoot of Bill Walsh's West Coast Offense, relying on short pass routes. Meyer's base offense spreads three receivers and puts the quarterback in shotgun formation. Then, he introduces motion in the backfield and turns it into an option attack, adding elements of the traditional run-oriented option offense.

In 2004, Meyer led the undefeated Utes to a Bowl Championship Series bid, something that had not been done by a team from a non-automatically qualifying BCS conference since the formation of the BCS in 1998. He remained at Utah long enough to coach the team to a Fiesta Bowl win over Pittsburgh, capping off the Utes' first perfect season (12–0) since 1930.

In 2003, Utes quarterback Alex Smith threw for 2,247 yards and 15 touchdowns and ran for 452 yards with five touchdowns. In 2004, he threw for 2,952 yards with 32 touchdowns and ran for 631 yards and 10 touchdowns. His production in Meyer's offensive scheme was a large reason why Smith was considered a first-round pick entering the 2005 NFL draft.

=== Florida ===
In the wake of his accomplishments at Utah, both the University of Florida and the University of Notre Dame vied for his services. Meyer chose to become Florida's head coach for the 2005 season, signing a seven-year contract worth $14 million. He later signed a six-year contract extension with the Gators on June 7, 2007; the extended contract paid an average of $3.25 million per year. On August 3, 2009, Meyer received another contract extension that made him the SEC's highest-paid coach during the 2009 season; his 2009 extension was worth $24 million over six years. At the time of the latest contract extension, Meyer was the third highest-paid college football coach, behind only Pete Carroll and Charlie Weis.

Meyer has been criticized by some commentators because 31 of his players were arrested during his six years as the Gators' coach. The seriousness of the charges varied widely, from minor offenses such as possession of alcohol by a minor to the charges of possession of a concealed weapon, "aggravated stalking, domestic violence by strangulation, aggravated assault, burglary, larceny and fraudulent use of credit cards". Many of the charges were ultimately dismissed.

In September 2010, after Gator receiver Chris Rainey was arrested for sending a threatening text message to a former girlfriend, Meyer stated that he was "real upset about that. After a while, enough's enough. If there's something that we can improve on, we're certainly looking into that. It's like if our graduation rate stinks then we gotta improve that. If there are other issues in a program, that's our job to get it better. It's people making stupid mistakes, that's something we gotta correct."

==== 2005 season ====
In 2005, his first season at Florida, Meyer's Gators team finished the season 9–3 (5–3 in the Southeastern Conference). The season included an undefeated record at home and a 31–24 victory against Iowa in the Outback Bowl in Tampa, Florida. The Gators would have faced LSU in the SEC Championship Game, but they lost to South Carolina and former Florida head coach Steve Spurrier in the SEC regular-season finale.

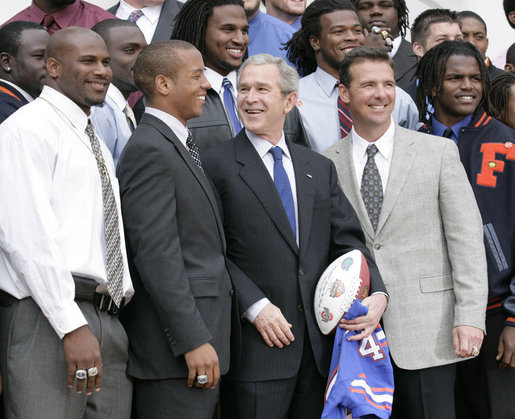
Meyer at the White House in 2007.

==== 2006 season ====
In 2006, Meyer coached the Gators to a 13–1 (8–1 in the SEC) record, with the one loss coming to the Auburn Tigers. After clinching the SEC East, the Gators won the SEC Championship Game on December 2 over Arkansas by a score of 38–28. The Gators defeated the Ohio State Buckeyes, 41–14, in the 2007 BCS National Championship Game to win the national championship. It was the first BCS bowl berth for the Gators since the Orange Bowl that capped off the 2001 campaign, and Florida's first national championship appearance and victory since winning the 1997 Sugar Bowl.

Meyer has been known for winning big games. In addition to his 5–1 record in bowl games at Florida, Meyer compiled a 16–2 record against three of the Gators' biggest opponents—Tennessee, Georgia, and Florida State.

==== 2007 season ====
The Gators managed a 9–3 regular season record in 2007, including blowout wins over rivals Tennessee and FSU but once again losing to Auburn. During his tenure at the University of Florida, Coach Meyer never defeated Auburn. Quarterback Tim Tebow also became Coach Meyer's first Heisman Trophy winner. The team led the conference in scoring, but struggles on defense made it difficult for the Gators to reach a BCS bowl game. The Gators lost the Capital One Bowl to Michigan 41–35 on January 1, 2008. Meyer served as a pre-game and halftime analyst for the 2008 BCS National Championship Game.

==== 2008 season ====
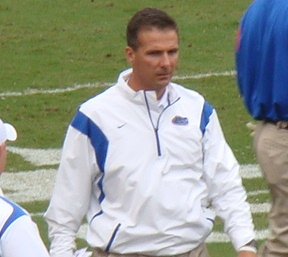
Meyer with the Florida Gators in 2008

In 2008, Meyer led the Gators to a 13–1 overall record and the BCS National Championship over Oklahoma, including wins over six ranked teams. The team's lone defeat came at the hands of Ole Miss on September 27, 2008, a game in which Florida led in time of possession and passing yards, but had three turnovers. Eleven of the Gators' twelve wins in the 2008 regular season were by 20 points or more. On December 6, 2008, Meyer led the Gators to a 31–20 victory over then top-ranked Alabama in the SEC title game. Leading in time of possession, rushing yards, and passing yards, the Gators rallied from behind after a third-quarter deficit to score two touchdowns and hold Alabama scoreless in the fourth quarter. The victory would vault Florida to No. 1 in the Associated Press Poll, No. 2 in the USA Today Coaches' Poll, and No. 2 in the BCS rankings, setting up a showdown against Oklahoma in the BCS Championship Game on January 8, 2009, at Dolphin Stadium in Miami, Florida. The Gators won 24–14, securing their second national championship under Meyer.

==== 2009 season ====
In 2009, Meyer's Gators began the season ranked No. 1 by the largest margin in the history of the AP preseason poll. Though the team struggled on offense at times, and quarterback Tim Tebow suffered a frightening concussion in a September victory over Kentucky, Florida finished the regular season 12–0 and still ranked No. 1. The winning streak ended in the SEC Championship Game, when they lost 32–13 to Alabama.

Florida was selected to play the undefeated Cincinnati Bearcats in the 2010 Sugar Bowl. The Gators won 51–24 to finish the season with a 13–1 record for the second consecutive year.

==== Leave of absence ====
In the early morning of December 6, 2009, soon after returning home following his team's loss in the 2009 SEC Championship Game, Meyer was quietly admitted into a Gainesville hospital suffering from chest pains and dehydration. He was released later in the day, and the incident was not announced to the public at the time.

On December 26, after discussions with his family, Meyer revealed his medical scare and announced that he would resign as Florida's head coach due to health and family concerns following his team's New Year's Day Sugar Bowl appearance. Meyer stated: "I have ignored my health for years, but recent developments have forced me to re-evaluate my priorities of faith and family." He also said: "I'm proud to be a part of the Gainesville community and the Gator Nation and I plan to remain in Gainesville and involved with the University of Florida." Meyer admitted that he had suffered frequent chest pains, later discovered to be caused by gastroesophageal reflux disease (GERD), and occasional severe headaches due to an arachnoid cyst for years, and that they were related to stress.

On December 27, Meyer announced that he would take an indefinite leave of absence instead of resigning. He was unsure if he would return for the 2010 season but stated that "I do in my gut believe that will happen." Offensive coordinator Steve Addazio would serve as the interim coach in Meyer's absence.

On January 1, 2010, Meyer coached the Gators in their 51–24 Sugar Bowl victory over the Cincinnati Bearcats. In a post-game interview, Meyer again suggested that he would return to coach the Gators at some point by saying: "I plan on being the coach of the Gators."

Meyer took significant time off from his coaching duties after the bowl game in an attempt to improve his personal health. While he did stay in touch with potential new players during the busy recruiting season, Meyer did much less traveling to visit recruits than usual. Nevertheless, the Gators still signed the consensus No. 1 recruiting class in the nation in February.

On March 17, 2010, Meyer returned full-time to his position for the start of the Gators' spring practice and continued in that role into the 2010 season.

==== 2010 season ====
With his victory over Kentucky on September 25, 2010, Meyer achieved his 100th career win as a coach. With that win, his record was at 100–18 over the course of 10 seasons. He became the sixth fastest NCAA coach to reach that record, following Gil Dobie (108 games), George Woodruff (109 games), Bud Wilkinson (111 games), Fielding Yost (114 games), and Knute Rockne (117 games). He was also the second-fastest to reach 100 wins since Wilkinson in 1945.

Despite reaching this milestone, the season was a difficult one for the Gators, and their 7–5 regular-season record was the worst in Meyer's tenure at Florida. On December 8, 2010, Meyer again announced his retirement from coaching for much the same reasons he mentioned in December 2009: his family and his health.

Meyer's last game as Florida's coach was a 37–24 win in the 2011 Outback Bowl on January 1, 2011.

==== Aftermath ====
After a three-month investigation, the Sporting News published an exposé titled "How Urban Meyer broke Florida football", suggesting that Meyer had created a toxic culture in the locker room at Florida and departed just before implosion. The article quoted several Florida players who declared that Meyer developed a "Circle of Trust" that included only star players, and that those players received favorable treatment, including not having to complete workouts, lenient punishment, and hiding the player's positive drug tests from the public. Although Meyer stated: "I've never heard of Circle of Trust before in my life", former players contend it was the foundation of Florida's culture under Meyer.

=== ESPN career ===
After resigning as the head football coach of the Florida Gators, Meyer worked as a college football commentator and analyst for the American television sports network ESPN.

=== Ohio State ===
On November 17, 2011, Eleven Warriors reported that Meyer would become the head coach of the Ohio State Buckeyes. Meyer denied the report publicly, then asked ESPN to be taken off assignment during the weekend of the Ohio State–Michigan game, adding more to the speculations that he might be named the next head coach of Ohio State. On November 28, WBNS Columbus confirmed that Meyer had accepted the job as Ohio State's head football coach, and was introduced as head coach later that night. The school said Meyer would receive a six-year contract that paid $4 million annually, plus another $2.4 million total in "retention payments". It was reported by CBS Sports on April 13, 2015, that Meyer signed a contract extension with the Buckeyes through 2020.

==== 2012 season ====
In Meyer's first year of coaching at Ohio State, he helped lead the Buckeyes to an undefeated 12–0 record and a No. 3 AP Poll ranking. The season was highlighted with ranked victories over Michigan State, Nebraska, and Michigan. The team was ineligible for all other rankings, as well as postseason play, due to NCAA sanctions. He was surrounded by first-year coaches such as offensive coordinator Tom Herman, co-offensive coordinator Ed Warriner, and co-defensive coordinator Everett Withers.

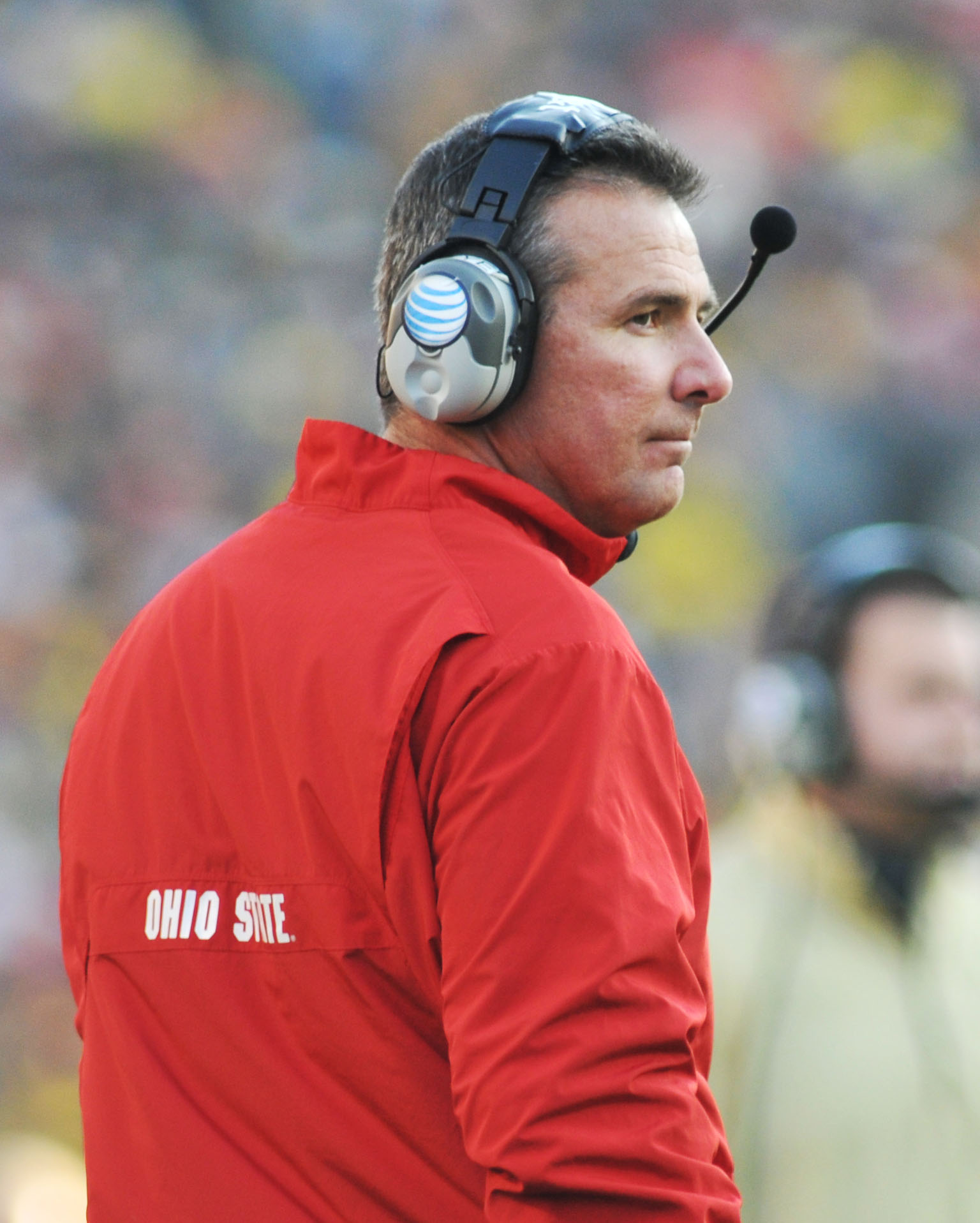
Meyer in 2013

==== 2013 season ====
In the 2013 regular season, Meyer helped lead Ohio State to ranked wins over Wisconsin and Northwestern. The regular season was capped with a 42–41 road win over Michigan. Ohio State qualified for the Big Ten Championship, which they lost 34–24 to Michigan State. Ohio State lost 40–35 to Clemson in the Orange Bowl. Ohio State finished #12 in the BCS rankings and a 12–2 record. Meyer lost talent at the end of the year to the 2014 NFL Draft, including linebacker Ryan Shazier, cornerback Bradley Roby, and running back Carlos Hyde. Roby and Shazier went in the first round, and Hyde went in the second round.

==== 2014 season ====
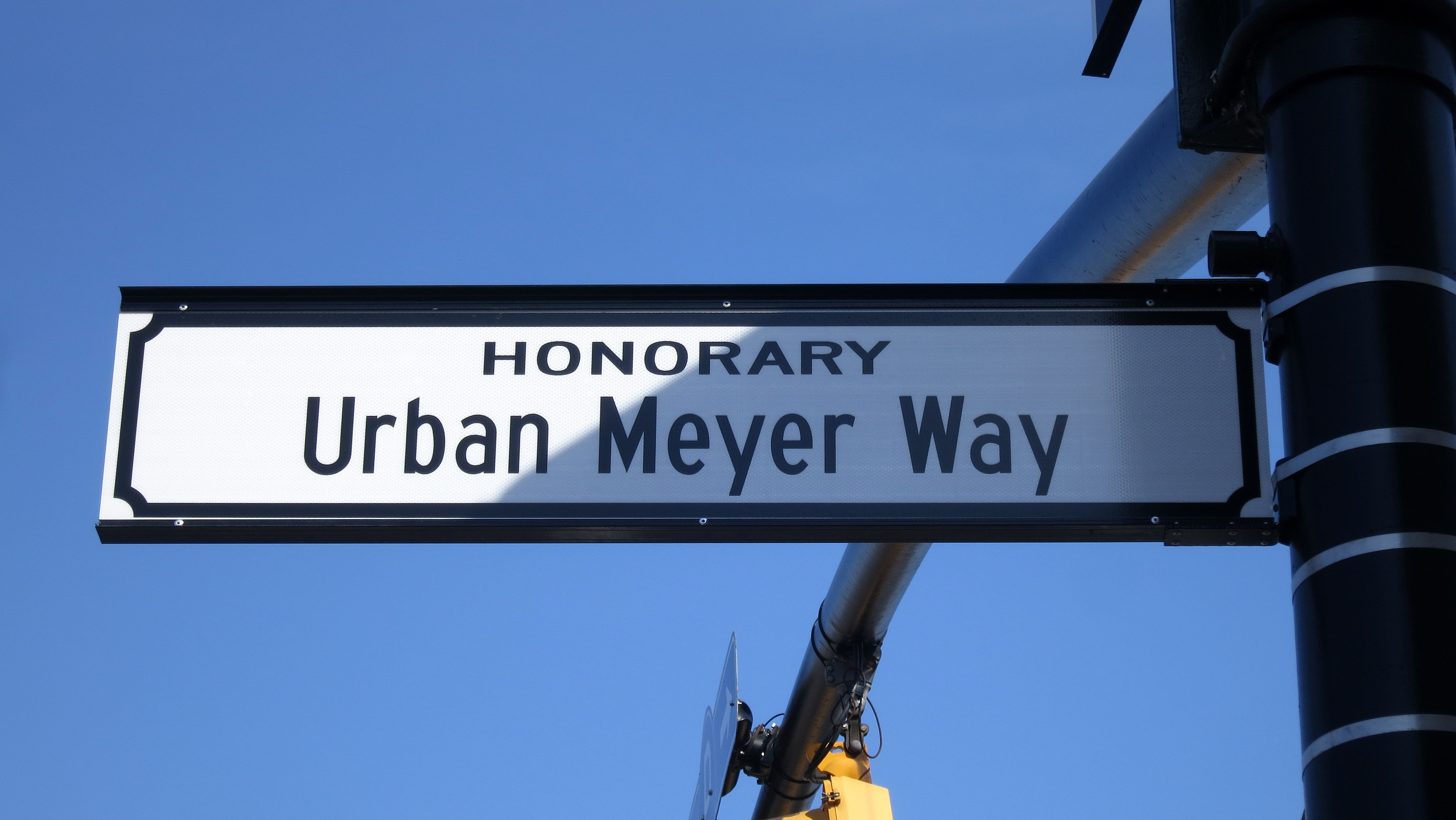
Dublin, Ohio, the city in which Urban Meyer resides, renamed West Bridge Street in his honor for his accomplishments during the 2014 season.

Before the start of the season, Ohio State lost its star quarterback, Braxton Miller, when he sustained a right shoulder injury during practice. Redshirt freshman quarterback J. T. Barrett stepped in as his replacement and led Ohio State to an 11–1 record through the first 12 games of the season. However, in the final game of the regular season, he sustained a broken ankle and was lost for the remainder of the year. Cardale Jones replaced Barrett at quarterback and guided Ohio State to a 59–0 blowout win over Wisconsin in the Big Ten Football Championship Game. With the conference championship and the convincing win over Wisconsin, Ohio State moved up to #4 in the College Football Playoff rankings, jumping the two Big 12 teams in playoff contention, Baylor and TCU, qualifying for the inaugural four-team postseason tournament. They played #1 Alabama in the semifinal Sugar Bowl. Despite being nine-point underdogs and trailing by as much as 15 points in the first half, Ohio State came back to win, 42–35. The Buckeyes then faced Heisman Trophy winner Marcus Mariota and the Oregon Ducks in the College Football Playoff National Championship. The Buckeyes were again underdogs as the #2-ranked Ducks were favored by seven points. Despite giving up four turnovers, Ohio State beat Oregon, 42–20, with MVP performances from running back Ezekiel Elliott and safety Tyvis Powell. The victory marked the eighth national championship in Ohio State's history and gave Meyer his third career national title, following his two with Florida.

==== 2015 season ====
Meyer and the Buckeyes started off their title defense as the preseason unanimous #1 in the AP Poll. The Buckeyes started the season with a 10–0 record to extend their winning streak to 23 games, a new school record. On November 21, against #9 Michigan State, the Buckeyes fell 17–14 to end the winning streak. Ohio State ended the season with a 42–13 win over #12 Michigan. Ohio State did not return to the College Football Playoff. The Buckeyes ended their season with a 44–28 win over Notre Dame in the Fiesta Bowl.

==== 2016 season ====
Meyer and the Buckeyes started off the 2016 season as #6 in the AP Poll. The Buckeyes had a 6–0 start with ranked wins over Oklahoma and Wisconsin and rose to #2 in the country. They were upset by Penn State on October 22. The Buckeyes rallied to win their next five games, including a 62–3 win over #9 Nebraska and a 30–27 2OT win over Michigan. Ohio State made the College Football Playoff. In the Semifinals at the Fiesta Bowl, they were defeated 31–0 by Clemson.

==== 2017 season ====
Meyer and the Buckeyes started off the 2017 season as #2 in the AP Poll. After a season-opening win over Indiana, Ohio State dropped the game against #5 Oklahoma 31–16. The Buckeyes went on a six-game winning streak, which included a 39–38 win over #2 Penn State. In the following game, on the road against Iowa, Ohio State suffered a 55–24 defeat. Ohio State closed out the regular season on a three-game winning streak to get to the Big Ten Championship, a 27–21 win over #3 Wisconsin. Ohio State defeated #8 USC 24–7 in the Cotton Bowl to finish 12–2.

==== 2018 season ====
On August 1, 2018, Meyer was placed on paid administrative leave by Ohio State after reports surfaced that Meyer knew about spousal abuse allegations against assistant coach Zach Smith prior to Smith's firing the week prior.

After an independent investigative panel reviewed the evidence, the Ohio State Board of Trustees found that Meyer and Ohio State University Athletic Director Gene Smith did not uphold the values of the university. On August 22, the board voted to suspend Meyer for the opening three games of the season for the Buckeyes. He missed the team's games against Oregon State, Rutgers, and TCU.

Ohio State finished the year with a 12–1 record, including winning the Big Ten conference, but was not selected for the College Football Playoff, instead receiving a spot in the 2019 Rose Bowl.

On December 4, 2018, Meyer announced that he would retire from coaching following the team's Rose Bowl game for health reasons. It was announced that Ryan Day would take over the head coaching position immediately after the Rose Bowl.

=== Jacksonville Jaguars ===
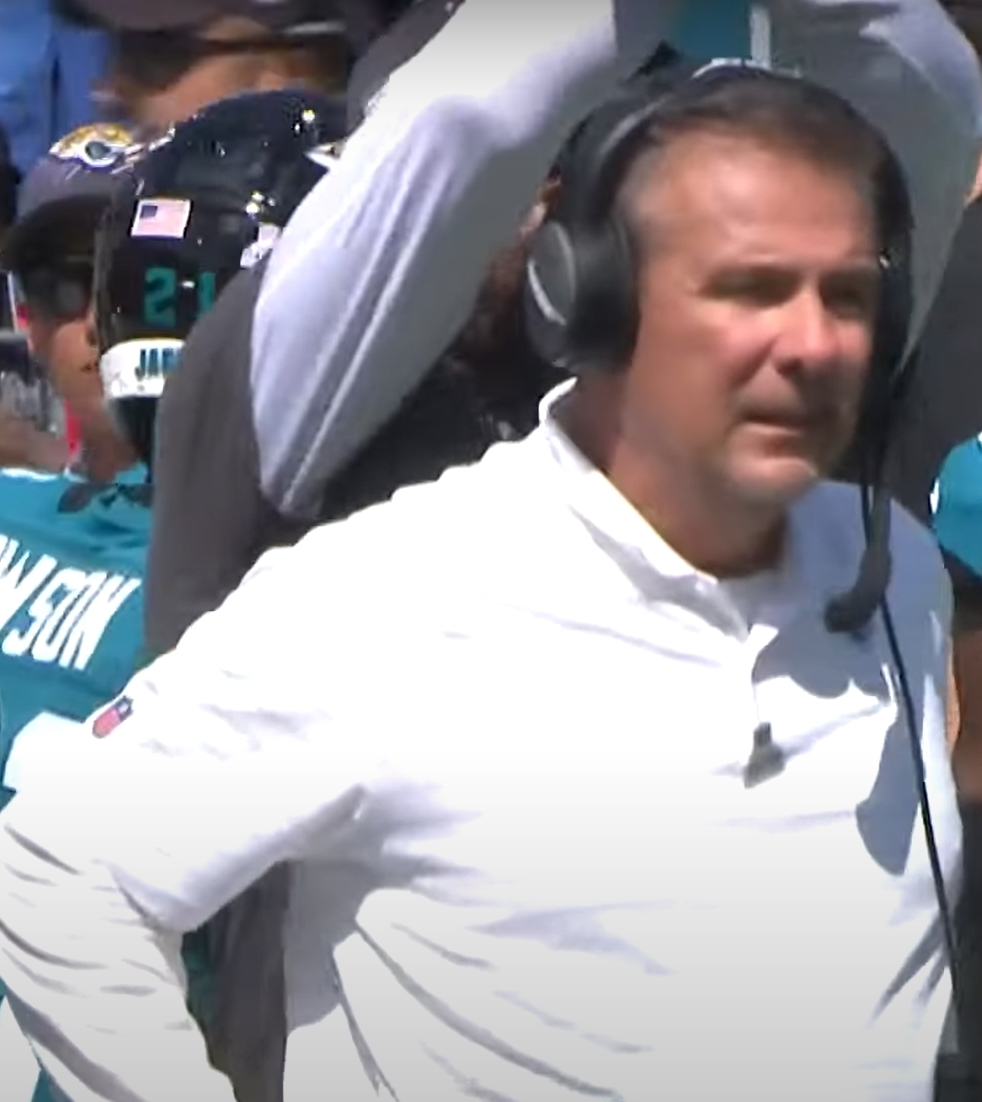
Meyer with the Jaguars in 2021

On January 14, 2021, Meyer was hired to become the head coach of the Jacksonville Jaguars. On July 1, 2021, the NFL fined Meyer $100,000 for violating practice rules during organized team activities.

In early October, a video appeared to show Meyer inappropriately touching a woman who was not his wife while he was at his Columbus-area restaurant, Urban Meyer's Pint House. Meyer apologized to the team and personnel. Jaguars owner Shahid Khan said that Meyer's behavior had been "inexcusable" and that Meyer "must regain our trust and respect".

The Jaguars won their first regular season game on October 17 against the Miami Dolphins by a score of 23–20. The Jaguars won their second regular season game when they defeated the heavily favored Buffalo Bills by a score of 9–6 on November 7.

Toward the end of the 2021 season, Jaguars players and coaches were critical of Meyer's treatment of them, to which the team officially responded with assertions of Meyer's job security.

On December 15, former Jaguars kicker Josh Lambo publicly accused Meyer of physical abuse, saying that Meyer repeatedly kicked Lambo's leg during warmups prior to the team's final preseason game. Lambo said it was inexcusable for any boss at any workplace to strike an employee. After Lambo told Meyer never to kick him again, Lambo said Meyer responded, "I'm the head ball coach. I'll kick you whenever the fuck I want." Later that day, Lambo reported the incident to his agent, who then reported it to the Jaguars team. Within hours of these new revelations from Lambo, Jaguars owner Shahid Khan made the decision to fire Meyer from his position and informed him of this in the early hours of December 16, 2021.

Meyer recorded a 2–11 (.154) record during his brief tenure. His thirteen-game tenure is tied with Lou Holtz and Bobby Petrino for fourth-shortest coaching tenures in NFL history. Holtz and Petrino also were making their NFL head coaching debuts after previously being a head coach in college. His .154 winning percentage is the worst of any non-interim head coach since Cam Cameron's .063 winning percentage with the Miami Dolphins in 2007.

On January 26, 2022, Meyer spoke publicly for the first time about his tenure with the Jaguars on Dan Dakich's podcast Don't @ Me, calling it "the worst experience I've had in my professional lifetime", citing the five-game losing streak and the differences in practice time compared to college football. Meyer added that he experienced "depression", and said, "I'd stare at the ceilings and [think] 'are we doing everything possible' because I really believed we had a roster that was good enough to win games. I just don't think we did a great job."

== Spread offense ==
When Meyer landed his first head coaching position at Bowling Green University, he traveled to visit John L. Smith and Scott Linehan at University of Louisville, Randy Walker and Kevin Wilson at Northwestern University, Bill Snyder at Kansas State University, Joe Tiller and Jim Chaney at Purdue University, and Rich Rodriguez at West Virginia University, all of whom ran some version of the spread offense.

Meyer's teams at Bowling Green, Utah, Florida, and Ohio State all ran the spread, chiefly utilizing a run-first variation most similar to Rodriguez's at West Virginia, but with tweaks to fit the offensive personnel. For example, Meyer's first two years at Florida skewed toward a drop-back passing attack led by Chris Leak, while Tim Tebow led an option run-based spread (as did Alex Smith at Utah). Using this offense, he won two BCS titles, won the inaugural College Football Playoff National Championship, became the first coach to lead a BCS non-automatically qualified conference team (Utah) to a BCS bowl, coached a Heisman Trophy winner (Tim Tebow), and graduated a player who became a number one overall pick in the NFL draft (Alex Smith).

== Coaching tree ==
Assistant coaches under Meyer who became NCAA or NFL head coaches:

- Steve Addazio: Temple (2011–2012), Boston College (2013–2019), Colorado State (2020–2021)
- Gary Andersen: Utah State (2009–2012; 2019–2020), Wisconsin (2013–2014), Oregon State (2015–2017)
- Chris Ash: Rutgers (2016–2019)
- Tim Beck: Coastal Carolina (2023–2025)
- Tim Beckman: Toledo (2009–2011), Illinois (2012–2014)
- Gregg Brandon: Bowling Green (2003–2008), Colorado Mines (2015–2021)
- Ryan Day: Ohio State (2018–present)
- Stan Drayton: Temple (2022–2024)
- D. J. Durkin: Maryland (2016–2018)
- Luke Fickell: Cincinnati (2017–2022), Wisconsin (2023–present)
- Brian Hartline: South Florida (2026–present)
- Cody Hawkins: Idaho State (2023–present)
- Tom Herman: Houston (2015–2016), Texas (2017–2020), Florida Atlantic (2023–2024)
- Jay Hill: Weber State (2014–2022)
- Doc Holliday: Marshall (2010–2020)
- Scot Loeffler: Bowling Green (2019–2024)
- Tosh Lupoi: Cal (2026–present)
- Dan McCarney: North Texas (2011–2015)
- Dan Mullen: Mississippi State (2009–2017), Florida (2018–2021), UNLV (2025–present)
- Mike Sanford Sr.: UNLV (2005–2009), Indiana State (2013–2016)
- Greg Schiano: Rutgers (2020–present)
- Brian Schottenheimer: Dallas Cowboys (2025–present)
- Charlie Strong: Louisville (2010–2013), Texas (2014–2016), South Florida (2017–2019)
- Mike Vrabel: Tennessee Titans (2018–2023), New England Patriots (2025–present)
- Kyle Whittingham: Utah (2005–2025), Michigan (2026–present)
- Kevin Wilson: Tulsa (2023–2024)
- Everett Withers: James Madison (2014–2015), Texas State (2016–2018)

Players under Meyer who became NCAA or NFL head coaches:

- Morgan Scalley: Utah (2026–present)

== Head coaching record ==
=== College ===
Year	Team	Overall	Conference	Standing	Bowl/playoffs	Coaches^{#}	AP^{°}
Bowling Green Falcons (Mid-American Conference) (2001–2002)
2001	Bowling Green	8–3	5–3	T–3rd (East)			
2002	Bowling Green	9–3	6–2	3rd (East)			
Bowling Green:		17–6	11–5				
Utah Utes (Mountain West Conference) (2003–2004)
2003	Utah	10–2	6–1	1st	W Liberty	21	21
2004	Utah	12–0	7–0	1st	W Fiesta^{†}	5	4
Utah:		22–2	13–1				
Florida Gators (Southeastern Conference) (2005–2010)
2005	Florida	9–3	5–3	T–2nd (Eastern)	W Outback	16	12
2006	Florida	13–1	7–1	1st (Eastern)	W BCS NCG^{†}	1	1
2007	Florida	9–4	5–3	3rd (Eastern)	L Capital One	16	13
2008	Florida	13–1	7–1	1st (Eastern)	W BCS NCG^{†}	1	1
2009	Florida	13–1	8–0	1st (Eastern)	W Sugar^{†}	3	3
2010	Florida	8–5	4–4	2nd (Eastern)	W Outback		
Florida:		65–15	36–12				
Ohio State Buckeyes (Big Ten Conference) (2012–2018)
2012	Ohio State	12–0	8–0	1st (Leaders)	(Note: In 2012, Ohio State was ineligible for the Big Ten Conference title, postseason play, and the Coaches Poll.)		3
2013	Ohio State	12–2	8–0	1st (Leaders)	L Orange^{†}	10	12
2014	Ohio State	14–1	8–0	1st (East)	W Sugar^{†}, W CFP NCG^{†}	1	1
2015	Ohio State	12–1	7–1	T–1st (East)	W Fiesta^{†}	4	4
2016	Ohio State	11–2	8–1	T–1st (East)	L Fiesta^{†}	6	6
2017	Ohio State	12–2	8–1	1st (East)	W Cotton^{†}	5	5
2018	Ohio State	10–1 (Note: Meyer was placed on administrative leave for the first three games of the 2018 season. Offensive coordinator Ryan Day served as acting head coach in his absence, and Ohio State credits the first three games to Day and the final 11 games to Meyer. Under Day, the Buckeyes won all three contests, one of which was a conference game. Ohio State finished with a record of 13–1 and conference mark of 8–1.)	7–1	T–1st (East)	W Rose^{†}	3	3
Ohio State:		83–9	54–4				
Total:		187–32					
National championship Conference title Conference division title or championship game berth
^{†}Indicates BCS or CFP / New Years' Six bowl.; ^{#}Rankings from final Coaches Poll.; ^{°}Rankings from final AP Poll.

=== NFL ===
Team	Year	Regular season					Postseason			
Team	Year	Won	Lost	Ties	Win %	Finish	Won	Lost	Win %	Result
JAX	2021	2	11	0	.154	Fired	—	—	—	—
Total		2	11	0	.154		0	0	.000	

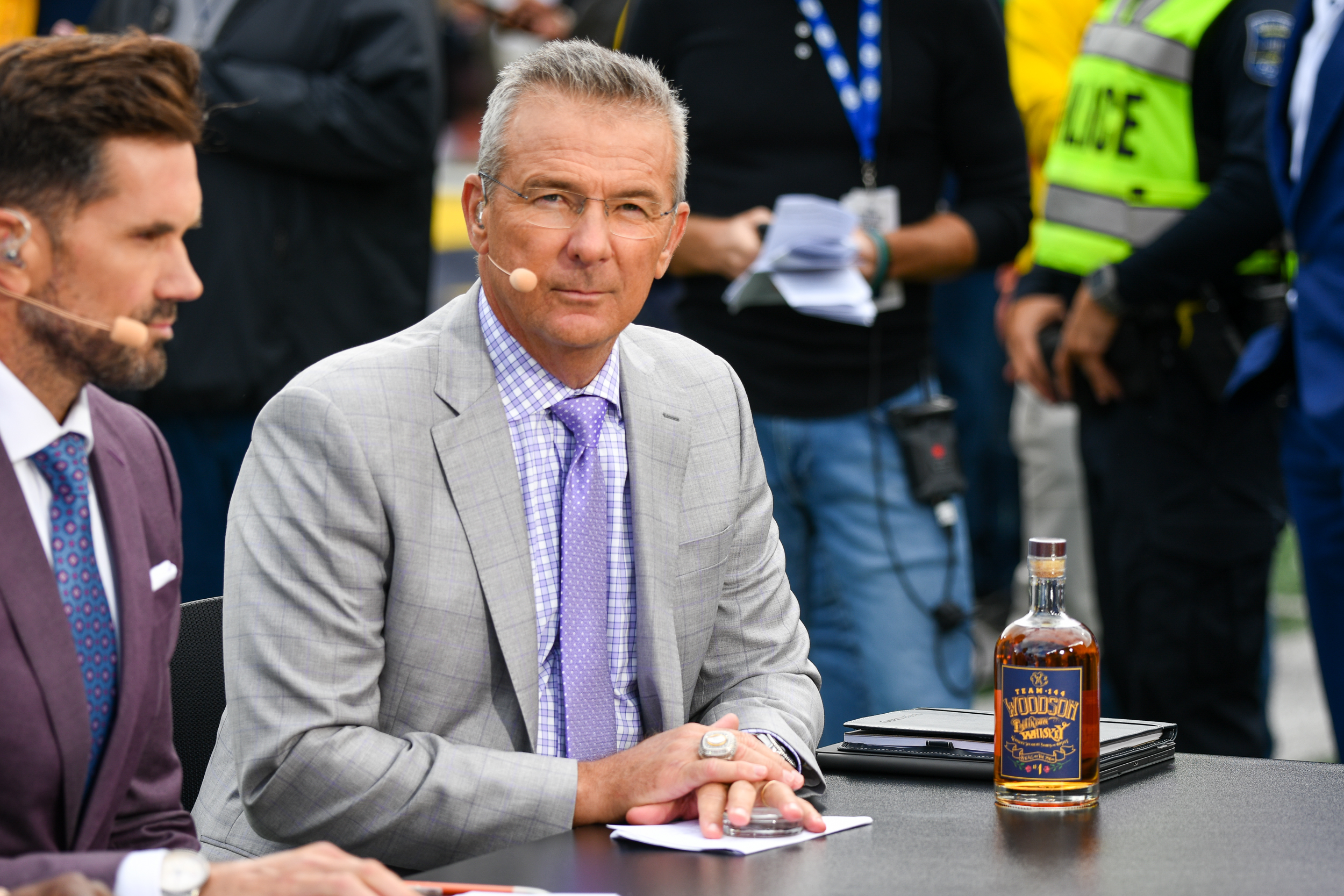
Meyer on the set of Big Noon Kickoff in 2024

== Personal life ==
While studying at University of Cincinnati, Meyer met Shelley Mather, a freshman nursing student, at Sigma Chi's Derby Days philanthropy event. They married in 1986. The Meyers have three children: Nicole ("Nicki"), Gisela ("Gigi") and Nathan ("Nate"). His daughters played Division I volleyball: Nicki played for Georgia Tech, and Gigi played for Florida Gulf Coast. He is a practicing Catholic.

== See also ==
- List of Ohio State University people
- List of Sigma Chi members
- List of University of Cincinnati people

== Bibliography ==
- 2012 Florida Football Media Guide, University Athletic Association, Gainesville, Florida (2012).
- Carlson, Norm, University of Florida Football Vault: The History of the Florida Gators, Whitman Publishing, LLC, Atlanta, Georgia (2007). ISBN 0-7948-2298-3.
- BGSU Football History, 2006 Bowling Green Football Media Guide.
- Ute Record Book, 2006 Utah Football Media Guide.
- Head Football Coach Urban Meyer, 2006 Gator Football Media Guide.
- Thompson, Wright (August 20, 2012). "Urban Meyer will be home for dinner". ESPN The Magazine. Bristol, Connecticut: ESPN.
