= Travis McGriff =

American football player (born 1976)

No. 83, 80, 3
- Position: Wide receiver

Personal information
- Born: June 24, 1976 (age 50); Gainesville, Florida, U.S.
- Listed height: 5 ft 8 in (1.73 m)
- Listed weight: 185 lb (84 kg)

Career information
- High school: P.K. Yonge (Gainesville)
- College: Florida
- NFL draft: 1999: 3rd round, 93rd overall pick

Career history
- Denver Broncos (1999–2001); Atlanta Falcons (2002)*; Orlando Predators (2003–2005); Nashville Kats (2005)
- * Offseason or practice squad member only

Awards and highlights
- Bowl Alliance national champion (1996); Third-team All-American (1998); First-team All-SEC (1998); AFL Rookie of the Year (2003)

Career NFL statistics
- Games played: 34
- Receptions: 5
- Receiving yards: 88
- Receiving touchdowns: 1
- Stats at Pro Football Reference

Career AFL statistics
- Receptions: 158
- Receiving yards: 2,290
- Receiving touchdowns: 45
- Stats at ArenaFan.com

William Travis McGriff (born June 24, 1976) is an American former professional football player who was a wide receiver in two different professional football leagues. McGriff played college football for the University of Florida, where he was a member of a national championship team. Thereafter, he played professionally for the Denver Broncos of the National Football League (NFL), and the Orlando Predators and Nashville Kats of the Arena Football League (AFL).

== Early life and family ==
McGriff was born in Gainesville, Florida in 1976. He attended P.K. Yonge High School in Gainesville, where he was a standout high school football player for the P.K. Yonge Blue Wave.

McGriff was born into a family of prominent University of Florida alumni. His father, Lee McGriff, was a walk-on for the Florida Gators football team who became a first-team All-Southeastern Conference (SEC) wide receiver, and later, an assistant coach for the Gators. His grandfather, Jack McGriff, was a member of the Florida Gators track and field team, and became the principal of the university's laboratory school, P. K. Yonge Developmental Research School. His father's cousin, Perry McGriff, was a split end for the Gators in 1958 and 1959, and later became a state representative. Perry's son, Mark McGriff, was a tight end for the Gators from 1984 to 1988.

== College career ==
McGriff accepted an athletic scholarship to attend the University of Florida in Gainesville, where he was a wide receiver for coach Steve Spurrier's Florida Gators football team from 1995 to 1998. He was a letterman on the Gators' SEC championship teams in 1995 and 1996. He was also a member of the Gators' first national championship team in 1996, which defeated the Florida State Seminoles 52–20 in the Sugar Bowl to win the Bowl Alliance national championship.

McGriff had seventy receptions as a senior in 1998, including thirteen catches in a 222-yard performance versus the South Carolina Gamecocks. He finished his final college season with ten touchdowns and an SEC single-season record of 1,357 yards receiving, and was a first-team All-SEC selection and a third-team All-American.

McGriff graduated from the University of Florida with a bachelor's degree in exercise and sport sciences in 2004.

== Professional career ==
McGriff was chosen in the third round (ninety-third pick overall) of the 1999 NFL draft by the Denver Broncos. He played for the Broncos for three seasons from 1999 to 2001. After three years with the Broncos, he was released in October 2001. He also had a short stint with the Atlanta Falcons.

He also played in the Arena Football League, including three seasons with the Orlando Predators from 2003 to 2005, where he won AFL Rookie of the Year honors in 2003, and part of one season for the Nashville Kats in 2005. He compiled 158 receptions for 2,290 yards and forty-five touchdowns in Arena Football League play.

== See also ==
- Florida Gators football, 1990–99
- History of the Denver Broncos
- List of Florida Gators football All-Americans
- List of Florida Gators in the NFL draft
- List of University of Florida alumni
