= Brian Clark (placekicker) =

American football player (born 1958)

No. 5
- Position: Kicker

Personal information
- Born: June 28, 1958 (age 68); Canton, Ohio, U.S.
- Listed height: 6 ft 2 in (1.88 m)
- Listed weight: 190 lb (86 kg)

Career information
- High school: Sarasota (Sarasota, Florida)
- College: Florida (1978–1981)
- NFL draft: 1982: 10th round, 253rd overall pick

Career history
- New England Patriots (1982)*; Tampa Bay Buccaneers (1982); Tampa Bay Bandits (1983)*; Atlanta Falcons (1983)*; New York Jets (1984)*
- * Offseason or practice squad member only

Awards and highlights
- First-team All-SEC (1981)

Career NFL statistics
- Games played: 1
- Stats at Pro Football Reference

Brian Matthew Clark (born June 28, 1958) is an American former professional football player who was a placekicker for the Tampa Bay Buccaneers of the National Football League (NFL). He played college football for the Florida Gators.

== Early life ==
Clark was born on June 28, 1958, in Canton, Ohio. He attended Sarasota High School in Sarasota, Florida.

== College career ==
Clark played college football for the Florida Gators from 1978 to 1981. He redshirted his first year and was a three-year letterman from 1979 to 1981. In three seasons as the starting kicker, Clark was perfect on extra points with 62 total in his career. He converted 43 of 63 field goal attempts and scored 191 points. Clark earned first-team All-SEC honors in 1981.

== Professional career ==
=== New England Patriots ===
Clark was selected in the tenth round, with the 253rd overall selection, by the New England Patriots in the 1982 NFL draft. On July 7, he signed his rookie contract. On August 31, Clark was placed on the injured reserve with a strained right leg. On November 24, he was waived by the team.

=== Tampa Bay Buccaneers ===
On December 23, 1982, Clark was signed by the Tampa Bay Buccaneers to handle kickoff duties. He performed two kickoffs before he was waived on December 27.

=== Tampa Bay Bandits ===
On January 1, 1983, Clark signed with the Tampa Bay Bandits of the United States Football League (USFL). On February 2, he was released.

=== Atlanta Falcons ===
On May 11, 1983, Clark was signed by the Atlanta Falcons. On October 15, he was waived by the team.

=== New York Jets ===
On May 30, 1984, Clark was signed by the New York Jets. On July 27, he was released.
