= 2000 NFL draft =

2000 American football draft

General information
- Date: April 15–16, 2000
- Time: 12:00 p.m. EDT (April 15); 11:00 a.m. EDT (April 16)
- Location: Theatre at MSG in New York City, New York
- Network: ESPN

Overview
- 254 total selections in 7 rounds
- League: NFL
- First selection: Courtney Brown, DE; Cleveland Browns
- Mr. Irrelevant: Mike Green, S Chicago Bears
- Most selections (13): Cleveland Browns; Green Bay Packers
- Fewest selections (5): Dallas Cowboys; Tampa Bay Buccaneers
- Hall of Famers: 1: LB Brian Urlacher

The 2000 NFL draft was the procedure by which National Football League teams selected amateur U.S. college football players. It is officially known as the NFL Annual Player Selection Meeting. The draft was held April 15–16, 2000, at the Theater at Madison Square Garden in New York City, New York. No teams chose to claim any players in the supplemental draft that year.

The draft started with Penn State teammates Courtney Brown and LaVar Arrington being selected consecutively, making them the only Penn State players to go number one and two in the same draft. The New York Jets had four first-round draft picks, the most by any team in the history of the draft (17 teams have had three picks but no other has had four).

The draft was notable for the selection of Michigan quarterback Tom Brady at the 199th pick in the sixth round by the New England Patriots. In his 23 seasons in the NFL, Brady won a record seven Super Bowl titles (six with the Patriots, one with the Tampa Bay Buccaneers), three NFL MVP awards and a record five Super Bowl MVPs. As a result of his late selection and subsequent success, Brady is considered to be the biggest steal in the history of the NFL draft. It was also the first year since 1966 that a pure placekicker was drafted in the first round, with the Oakland Raiders selecting Florida State's Sebastian Janikowski 17th overall. The University of Tennessee led all colleges with nine selections in the 2000 draft.

== Player selections ==
*	Compensatory selection
^	Supplemental compensatory selection
†	Pro Bowler (Note: Players are identified as a Pro Bowler if they were selected for the Pro Bowl at any time in their career.)
‡	Hall of Famer

Positions key
Offense	Defense	Special teams
QB — Quarterback; RB — Running back; FB — Fullback; WR — Wide receiver; TE — Tight end; OL — Offensive lineman; T — Tackle; G — Guard; C — Center	DL — Defensive lineman; DT — Defensive tackle (Note: Includes nose tackle (NT)); DE — Defensive end; EDGE — Edge rusher; LB — Linebacker (Note: Includes middle linebacker (MLB/MIKE), weakside linebacker (WILL), strongside linebacker (SAM), off-ball linebacker, and outside linebacker (OLB)); DB — Defensive back; CB — Cornerback; S — Safety (Note: Includes free safety (FS) and strong safety (SS))	K — Kicker (Note: Also known as a placekicker (PK)); P — Punter; LS — Long snapper; RS — Return specialist (Note: Includes kickoff and punt returners)

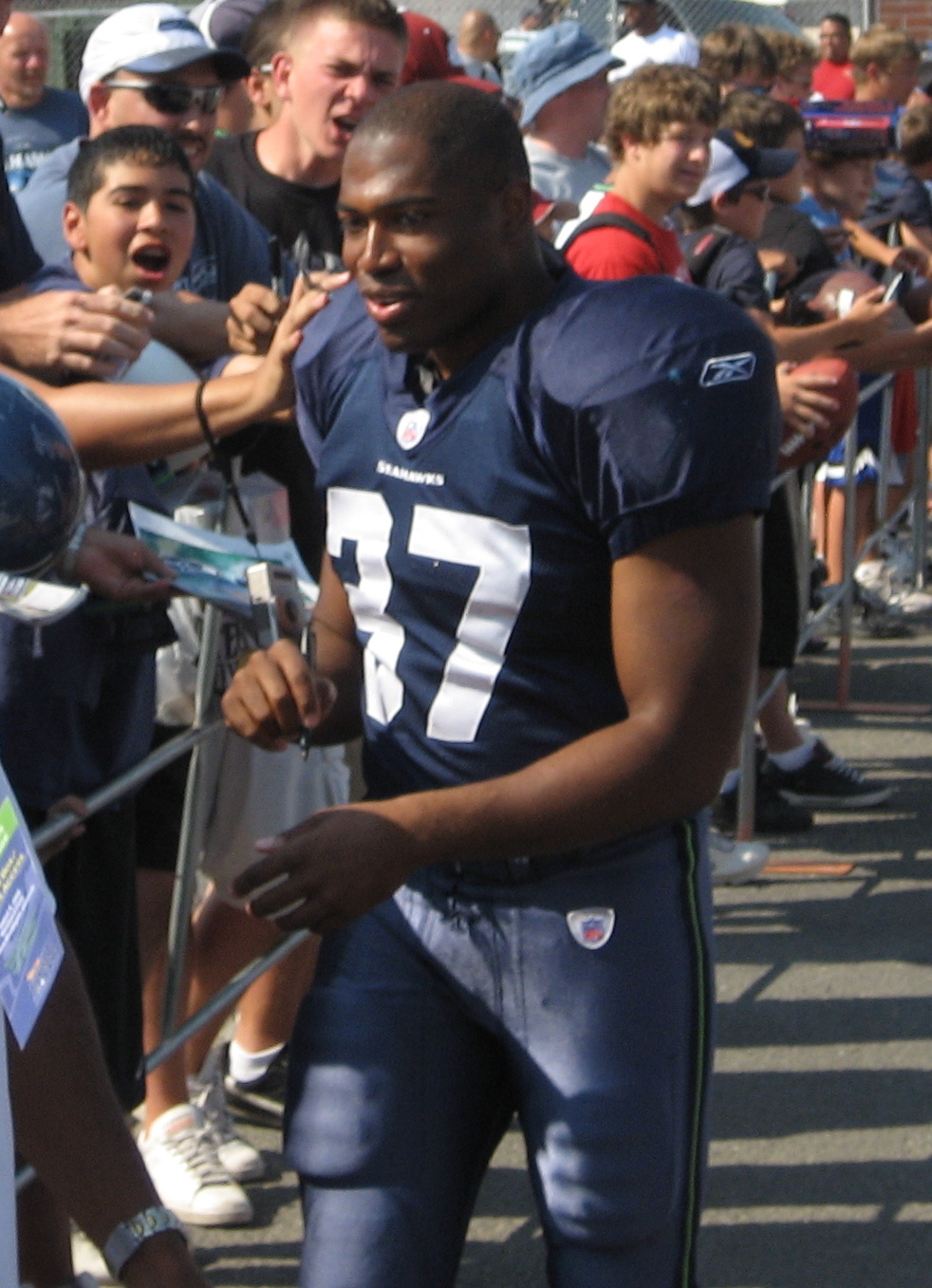
Running back Shaun Alexander

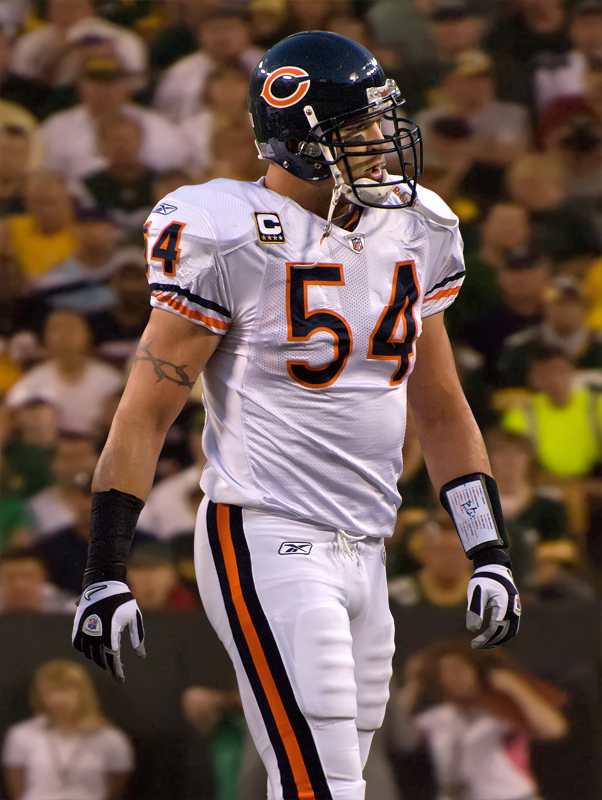
Linebacker Brian Urlacher

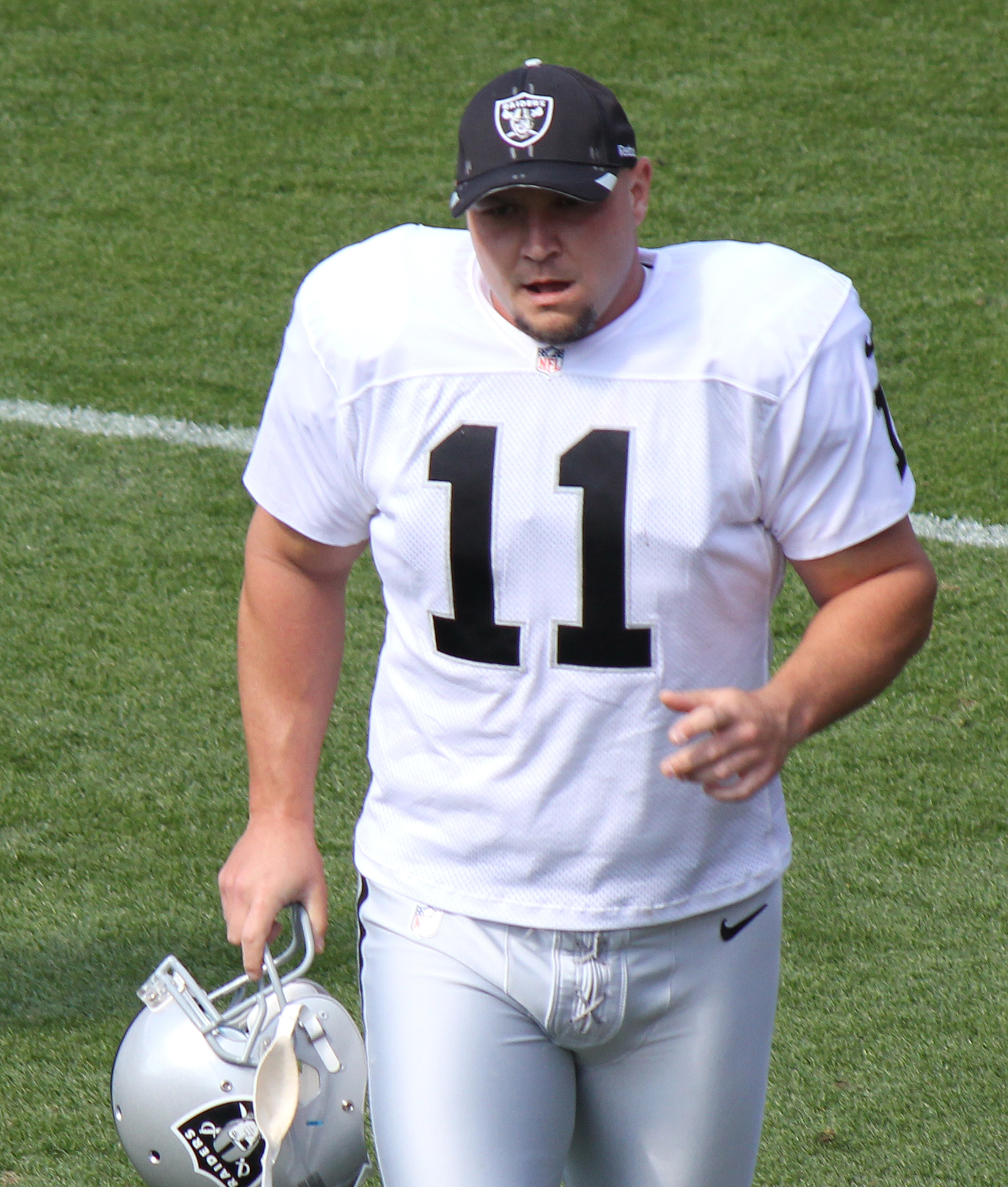
Sebastian Janikowski, the first kicker selected in the first round of the draft since 1966

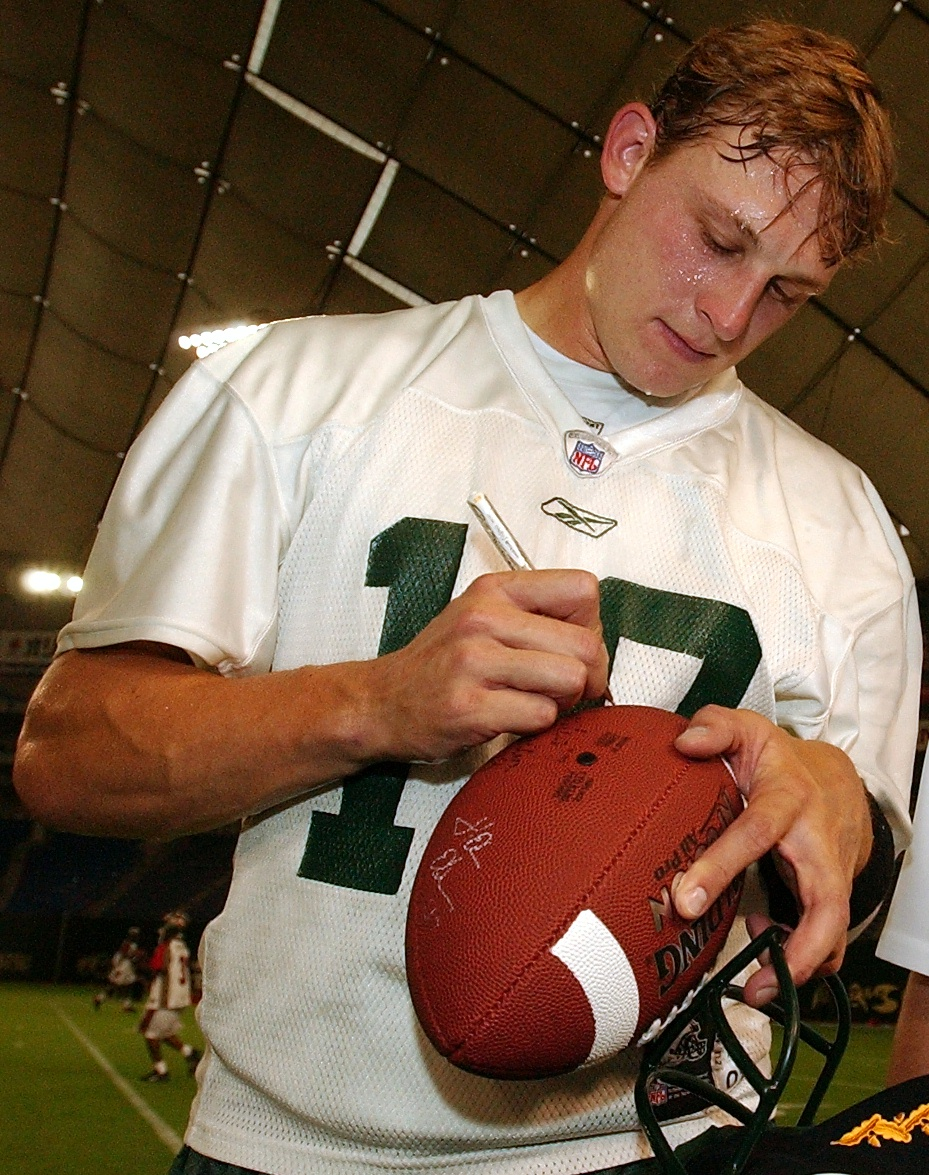
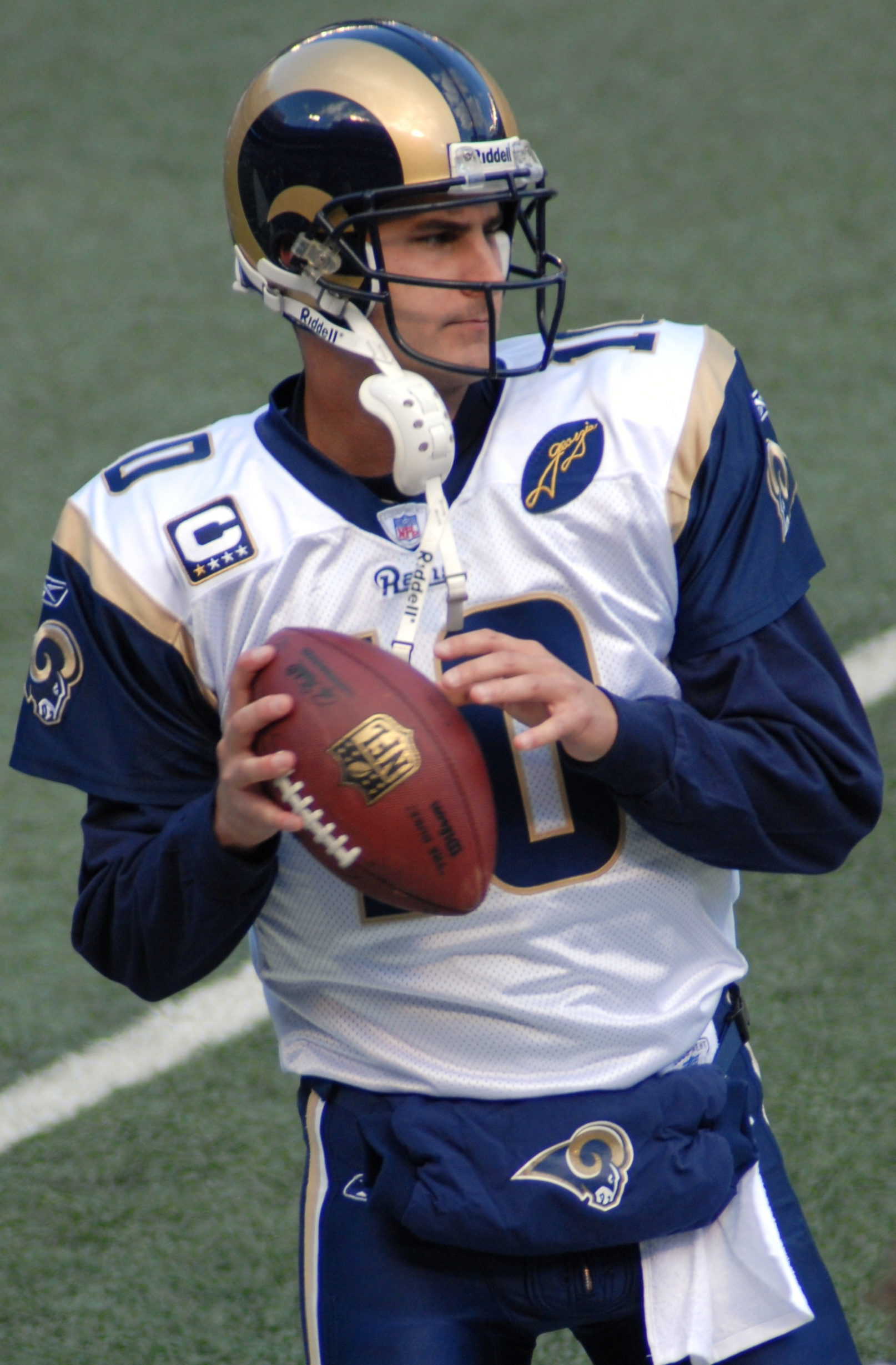
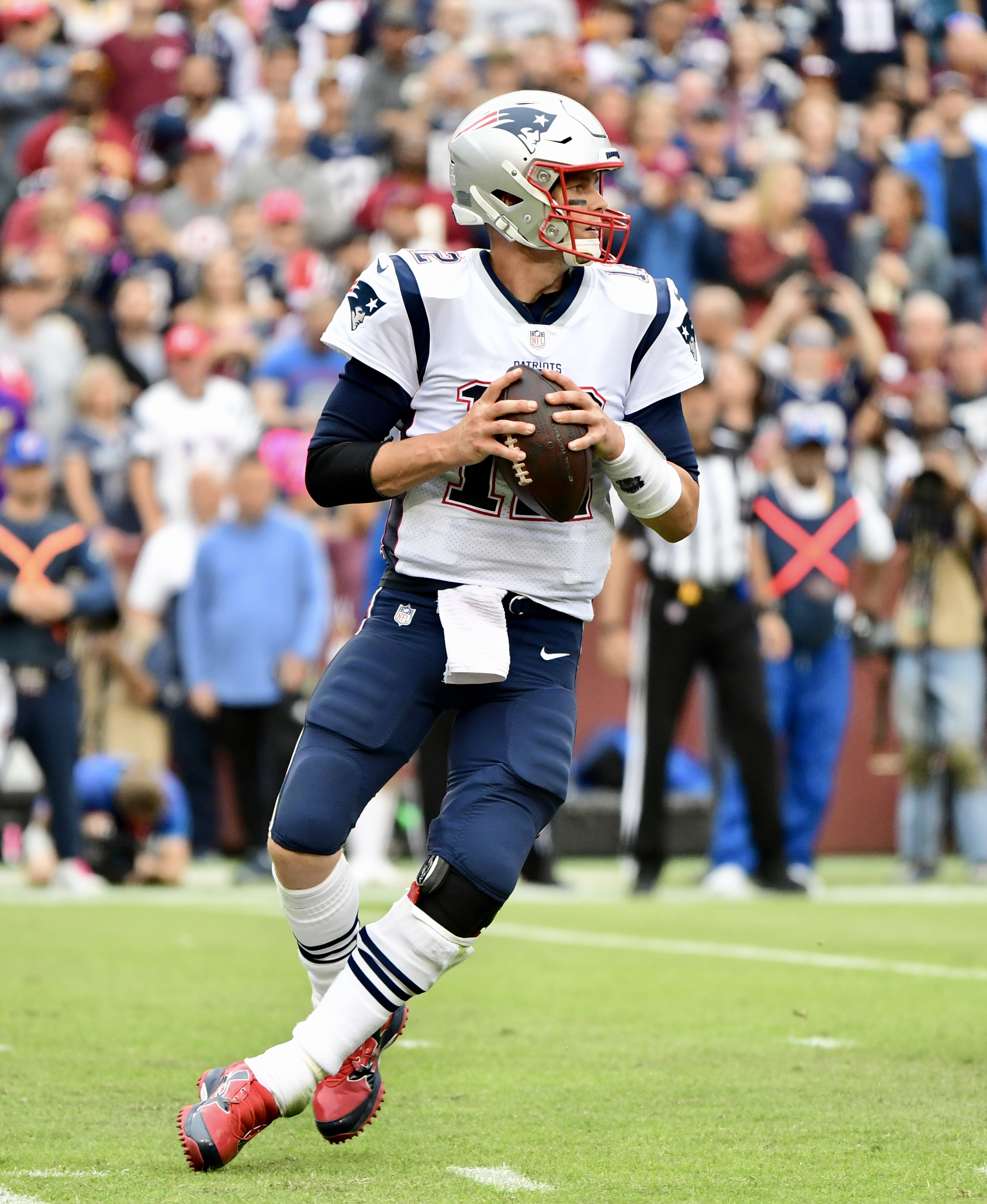
Chad Pennington (top) and Marc Bulger (middle) are two of the six quarterbacks taken before Tom Brady (bottom)

Rnd.	Pick	Team	Player	Pos.	College	Notes
1	1	Cleveland Browns	Courtney Brown	DE	Penn State	
1	2	Washington Redskins	LaVar Arrington ^{†}	LB	Penn State	from New Orleans (Note: No. 2: New Orleans → Washington (PD). New Orleans traded first- and third-round selections (2nd and 64th overall), and 1999 first-, third-, fourth-, fifth-, sixth- and seventh-round selections to Washington in exchange for a 1999 first-round selection.)
1	3	Washington Redskins	Chris Samuels ^{†}	T	Alabama	from San Francisco (Note: No. 3: San Francisco → Washington (PD). San Francisco traded a first-round selection (3rd overall) to Washington in exchange for two first-round selections, a fourth-round selection and a fifth-round selection (12th, 24th, 119th and 154th overall).)
1	4	Cincinnati Bengals	Peter Warrick	WR	Florida State	
1	5	Baltimore Ravens	Jamal Lewis ^{†}	RB	Tennessee	from Atlanta (Note: No. 5: Atlanta → Baltimore (PD). Atlanta traded a first-round selection (5th overall) to Baltimore in exchange for a 1999 second-round selection.)
1	6	Philadelphia Eagles	Corey Simon ^{†}	DT	Florida State	
1	7	Arizona Cardinals	Thomas Jones ^{†}	RB	Virginia	
1	8	Pittsburgh Steelers	Plaxico Burress	WR	Michigan State	
1	9	Chicago Bears	Brian Urlacher^{‡}^{†}	LB	New Mexico	
1	10	Baltimore Ravens	Travis Taylor	WR	Florida	from Denver (Note: No. 10: Denver → Baltimore (PD). Denver traded a first-round selection (10th overall) to Baltimore in exchange for first- and second-round selections (15th and 45th overall).)
1	11	New York Giants	Ron Dayne	RB	Wisconsin	1999 Heisman Trophy winner
1	12	New York Jets	Shaun Ellis ^{†}	DE	Tennessee	from Carolina via Washington and San Francisco (Note: No. 12: Carolina → Washington → San Francisco → NY Jets. Multiple trades: San Francisco → NY Jets (PD). San Francisco traded a first-round selection (12th overall) to the NY Jets in exchange for first- and second-round selections (16th and 48th overall). Washington → San Francisco (PD). See Round 1: San Francisco → Washington. Carolina → Washington (PD). Carolina sent a first-round selection (12th overall) and a 1999 first-round selection to Washington as compensation for signing non-exclusive franchise-tagged free agent DT Sean Gilbert.)
1	13	New York Jets	John Abraham ^{†}	DE	South Carolina	from San Diego via Tampa Bay (Note: No. 13: San Diego → Tampa Bay → NY Jets. Multiple trades: Tampa Bay → NY Jets (PD). Tampa Bay traded two first-round picks (13th and 27th overall) to the NY Jets in exchange for WR Keyshawn Johnson. San Diego → Tampa Bay (PD). San Diego traded a first-round selection (13th overall) to Tampa Bay in exchange for a 1998 second-round selection.)
1	14	Green Bay Packers	Bubba Franks ^{†}	TE	Miami (FL)	
1	15	Denver Broncos	Deltha O'Neal ^{†}	CB	California	from Baltimore (Note: No. 15: Baltimore → Denver (PD). See Round 1: Baltimore → Denver.)
1	16	San Francisco 49ers	Julian Peterson ^{†}	LB	Michigan State	from New England via NY Jets (Note: No. 16: New England → NY Jets → San Francisco. Multiple trades: New England → NY Jets (PD). New England traded a first-round selection (16th overall) and 2001 fourth- and seventh-round selections to the NY Jets in exchange for a 2001 fifth-round selection and a 2002 seventh-round selection as compensation for signing head coach Bill Belichick. NY Jets → San Francisco (D). See Round 1: San Francisco → NY Jets.)
1	17	Oakland Raiders	Sebastian Janikowski ^{†}	K	Florida State	
1	18	New York Jets	Chad Pennington	QB	Marshall	
1	19	Seattle Seahawks	Shaun Alexander ^{†}	RB	Alabama	from Dallas (Note: No. 19: Dallas → Seattle (PD). Dallas traded a first-round selection (19th overall) and a 2001 first-round selection to Seattle in exchange for WR Joey Galloway.)
1	20	Detroit Lions	Stockar McDougle	T	Oklahoma	
1	21	Kansas City Chiefs	Sylvester Morris	WR	Jackson State	
1	22	Seattle Seahawks	Chris McIntosh	T	Wisconsin	
1	23	Carolina Panthers	Rashard Anderson	CB	Jackson State	from Miami (Note: No. 23: Miami → Carolina (PD). Miami traded a first-round selection (23rd overall) to Carolina in exchange for a 1998 second-round selection.)
1	24	San Francisco 49ers	Ahmed Plummer	CB	Ohio State	from Washington (Note: No. 24: Washington → San Francisco (D). See Round 1: San Francisco → Washington.)
1	25	Minnesota Vikings	Chris Hovan	DT	Boston College	
1	26	Buffalo Bills	Erik Flowers	DE	Arizona State	
1	27	New York Jets	Anthony Becht	TE	West Virginia	from Tampa Bay (Note: No. 27: Tampa Bay → NY Jets (PD). See Round 1: Tampa Bay → NY Jets.)
1	28	Indianapolis Colts	Rob Morris	LB	BYU	
1	29	Jacksonville Jaguars	R. Jay Soward	WR	USC	
1	30	Tennessee Titans	Keith Bulluck ^{†}	LB	Syracuse	
1	31	St. Louis Rams	Trung Canidate	RB	Arizona	
2	32	Cleveland Browns	Dennis Northcutt	WR	Arizona	
2	33	New Orleans Saints	Darren Howard	DE	Kansas State	
2	34	Cincinnati Bengals	Mark Roman	S	LSU	
2	35	San Francisco 49ers	John Engelberger	DE	Virginia Tech	
2	36	Philadelphia Eagles	Todd Pinkston	WR	Southern Miss	
2	37	Atlanta Falcons	Travis Claridge	G	USC	
2	38	Pittsburgh Steelers	Marvel Smith ^{†}	T	Arizona State	
2	39	Chicago Bears	Mike Brown ^{†}	S	Nebraska	
2	40	Denver Broncos	Ian Gold ^{†}	LB	Michigan	
2	41	Arizona Cardinals	Raynoch Thompson	LB	Tennessee	
2	42	New York Giants	Cornelius Griffin	DT	Alabama	
2	43	San Diego Chargers	Rogers Beckett	S	Marshall	
2	44	Green Bay Packers	Chad Clifton ^{†}	T	Tennessee	
2	45	Denver Broncos	Kenoy Kennedy	S	Arkansas	from Baltimore (Note: No. 45: Baltimore → Denver (D). See Round 1: Denver → Baltimore.)
2	46	New England Patriots	Adrian Klemm	T	Hawaii	
2	47	Oakland Raiders	Jerry Porter	WR	West Virginia	
2	48	San Francisco 49ers	Jason Webster	CB	Texas A&M	from NY Jets (Note: No. 48: NY Jets → San Francisco (D). See Round 1: San Francisco → NY Jets.)
2	49	Dallas Cowboys	Dwayne Goodrich	CB	Tennessee	
2	50	Detroit Lions	Barrett Green	LB	West Virginia	
2	51	Tampa Bay Buccaneers	Cosey Coleman	G	Tennessee	from Carolina (Note: No. 51: Carolina → Tampa Bay (D). Carolina traded a second-round selection (51st overall) to Tampa Bay in exchange for second- and fourth-round selections (57th and 120th overall).)
2	52	Seattle Seahawks	Ike Charlton	CB	Virginia Tech	
2	53	Miami Dolphins	Todd Wade	T	Ole Miss	
2	54	Kansas City Chiefs	William Bartee	CB	Oklahoma	
2	55	Minnesota Vikings	Fred Robbins	DT	Wake Forest	
2	56	Minnesota Vikings	Michael Boireau	DE	Miami (FL)	from Washington (Note: No. 56: Washington → Minnesota (PD). Washington traded a second-round selection (56th overall), and 1999 first- and third-round selections to Minnesota in exchange for QB Brad Johnson.)
2	57	Carolina Panthers	Deon Grant	S	Tennessee	from Tampa Bay (Note: No. 57: Tampa Bay → Carolina (D). See Round 2: Carolina → Tampa Bay.)
2	58	Buffalo Bills	Travares Tillman	S	Georgia Tech	
2	59	Indianapolis Colts	Marcus Washington ^{†}	LB	Auburn	
2	60	Jacksonville Jaguars	Brad Meester	C	Northern Iowa	
2	61	Philadelphia Eagles	Bobbie Williams	G	Arkansas	from Tennessee (Note: No. 61: Tennessee → Philadelphia (D). Tennessee traded a second-round selection (61st overall) to Philadelphia in exchange for third- and fifth-round selections (68th and 135th overall).)
2	62	St. Louis Rams	Jacoby Shepherd	CB	Oklahoma State	
3	63	Cleveland Browns	Travis Prentice	RB	Miami (OH)	
3	64	Washington Redskins	Lloyd Harrison	CB	NC State	from New Orleans (Note: No. 64: New Orleans → Washington (PD). See Round 1: New Orleans → Washington.)
3	65	San Francisco 49ers	Giovanni Carmazzi	QB	Hofstra	
3	66	Cincinnati Bengals	Ron Dugans	WR	Florida State	
3	67	Atlanta Falcons	Mark Simoneau	LB	Kansas State	
3	68	Tennessee Titans	Erron Kinney	TE	Florida	from Philadelphia (Note: No. 68: Philadelphia → Tennessee (D). See Round 2: Tennessee → Philadelphia.)
3	69	Chicago Bears	Dez White	WR	Georgia Tech	
3	70	Denver Broncos	Chris Cole	WR	Texas A&M	
3	71	Arizona Cardinals	Darwin Walker	DT	Tennessee	
3	72	Pittsburgh Steelers	Kendrick Clancy	DT	Ole Miss	
3	73	New York Giants	Ron Dixon	WR	Lambuth	
3	74	Green Bay Packers	Steve Warren	DT	Nebraska	
3	75	Baltimore Ravens	Chris Redman	QB	Louisville	
3	76	New England Patriots	J. R. Redmond	RB	Arizona State	
3	77	Pittsburgh Steelers	Hank Poteat	CB	Pittsburgh	from Oakland (Note: No. 77: Oakland → Pittsburgh (PD). Oakland traded a third-round selection (77th overall) to Pittsburgh in exchange for two 1999 fifth-round selections (146th and 163rd overall).)
3	78	New York Jets	Laveranues Coles ^{†}	WR	Florida State	
3^	79	Cleveland Browns	JaJuan Dawson	WR	Tulane	
3	80	Seattle Seahawks	Darrell Jackson	WR	Florida	from Dallas (Note: No. 80: Dallas → Seattle (PD). Dallas traded a third-round selection (80th overall) to Seattle in exchange for WR James McKnight.)
3	81	Detroit Lions	Reuben Droughns	RB	Oregon	
3	82	Carolina Panthers	Leander Jordan	T	IUP	
3	83	San Diego Chargers	Damion McIntosh	T	Kansas State	
3	84	Miami Dolphins	Ben Kelly	CB	Colorado	
3	85	Kansas City Chiefs	Greg Wesley	S	Arkansas–Pine Bluff	
3	86	San Francisco 49ers	Jeff Ulbrich	LB	Hawaii	from Seattle (Note: No. 86: Seattle → San Francisco (D). Seattle traded a third-round selection (86th overall) to San Francisco in exchange for fourth- and fifth-round selections (119th and 154th overall).)
3	87	Chicago Bears	Dustin Lyman	TE	Wake Forest	from Washington (Note: No. 87: Washington → Chicago (PD). Washington traded a third-round selection (87th overall) and 1999 first-, third-, fourth- and fifth-round selections to Chicago in exchange for a 1999 first-round selection.)
3	88	Minnesota Vikings	Doug Chapman	RB	Marshall	
3	89	Buffalo Bills	Corey Moore	LB	Virginia Tech	
3	90	Tampa Bay Buccaneers	Nate Webster	LB	Miami (FL)	
3	91	Indianapolis Colts	David Macklin	CB	Penn State	
3	92	Jacksonville Jaguars	T.J. Slaughter	LB	Southern Miss	
3	93	Tennessee Titans	Byron Frisch	DE	BYU	
3	94	St. Louis Rams	John St. Clair	T	Virginia	
4	95	Cleveland Browns	Lewis Sanders	CB	Maryland	
4	96	New Orleans Saints	Terrelle Smith	FB	Arizona State	
4	97	Cincinnati Bengals	Curtis Keaton	RB	James Madison	
4	98	Green Bay Packers	Na'il Diggs	LB	Ohio State	from San Francisco (Note: No. 98: San Francisco → Green Bay (D). San Francisco traded a fourth-round selection (98th overall) to Green Bay in exchange for fourth- and fifth-round selections (108th and 132nd overall).)
4	99	Philadelphia Eagles	Gari Scott	WR	Michigan State	
4	100	Atlanta Falcons	Michael Thompson	T	Tennessee State	
4	101	Denver Broncos	Jerry Johnson	DT	Florida State	
4	102	Arizona Cardinals	David Barrett	CB	Arkansas	
4	103	Pittsburgh Steelers	Danny Farmer	WR	UCLA	
4	104	St. Louis Rams	Kaulana Noa	G	Hawaii	from Chicago (Note: No. 104: Chicago → St. Louis (D). Chicago traded a fourth-round selection (104th overall) to St. Louis in exchange for fourth-, fifth- and seventh-round selections (125th, 150th and 225th overall).)
4	105	New York Giants	Brandon Short	LB	Penn State	
4	106	Minnesota Vikings	Antonio Wilson	LB	Texas A&M–Commerce	from Baltimore (Note: No. 106: Baltimore → Minnesota (PD). Baltimore traded a fourth-round selection (106th overall) and a 1999 sixth-round selection to Minnesota in exchange for a sixth-round selection (191st overall) and G Everett Lindsay.)
4	–	New England Patriots	Selection forfeited during the 1999 supplemental draft. (Note: New England forfeited a fourth-round selection after selecting CB J'Juan Cherry in the 1999 supplemental draft.)			
4	107	Oakland Raiders	Junior Ioane	DE	Arizona State	
4	108	San Francisco 49ers	John Keith	S	Furman	from NY Jets via Green Bay (Note: No. 108: NY Jets → Green Bay → San Francisco. Multiple trades: NY Jets → Green Bay (PD). NY Jets traded a fourth-round selection (108th overall) to Green Bay in exchange for QB Rick Mirer. Green Bay → San Francisco (D). See Round 4: San Francisco → Green Bay.)
4	109	Dallas Cowboys	Kareem Larrimore	CB	West Texas A&M	
4^	110	Cleveland Browns	Aaron Shea	TE	Michigan	
4	111	San Diego Chargers	Trevor Gaylor	WR	Miami (OH)	from Detroit via Philadelphia (Note: No. 111: Detroit → Philadelphia → San Diego. Multiple trades: Detroit → Philadelphia (PD). Detroit traded a fourth-round selection (111th overall) to Philadelphia in exchange for a 1999 fifth-round selection. Philadelphia → San Diego (D). Philadelphia traded a fourth-round selection (111th overall) to San Diego in exchange for a 2001 third-round selection.)
4	112	Denver Broncos	Cooper Carlisle	G	Florida	from Carolina (Note: No. 112: Carolina → Denver (PD). Carolina traded a fourth-round selection (112th overall) and a 1999 third-round selection to Denver in exchange for QB Jeff Lewis.)
4	113	San Diego Chargers	Leonardo Carson	DT	Auburn	
4	114	Green Bay Packers	Anthony Lucas	WR	Arkansas	
4	115	Kansas City Chiefs	Frank Moreau	RB	Louisville	
4	116	Seattle Seahawks	Marcus Bell	LB	Arizona	
4	117	Miami Dolphins	Deon Dyer	FB	North Carolina	
4	118	Minnesota Vikings	Tyrone Carter	S	Minnesota	
4	119	Seattle Seahawks	Isaiah Kacyvenski	LB	Harvard	from Washington via San Francisco (Note: No. 119: Washington → San Francisco → Seattle. Multiple trades: Washington → San Francisco (D). See Round 1: San Francisco → Washington. San Francisco → Seattle (D). See Round 3: Seattle → San Francisco.)
4	120	Carolina Panthers	Alvin McKinley	DE	Mississippi State	from Tampa Bay (Note: No. 120: Tampa Bay → Carolina (D). See Round 2: Carolina → Tampa Bay.)
4	121	Buffalo Bills	Avion Black	WR	Tennessee State	
4	122	Indianapolis Colts	Josh Williams	DT	Michigan	
4	123	Jacksonville Jaguars	Joey Chustz	T	Louisiana Tech	
4	124	Tennessee Titans	Bobby Myers	S	Wisconsin	
4	125	Chicago Bears	Reggie Austin	CB	Wake Forest	from St. Louis (Note: No. 125: St. Louis → Chicago (D). See Round 4: Chicago → St. Louis.)
4*	126	Green Bay Packers	Gary Berry	S	Ohio State	
4*	127	New England Patriots	Greg Randall	T	Michigan State	
4*	128	Tennessee Titans	Peter Sirmon	LB	Oregon	
4*	129	Washington Redskins	Michael Moore	G	Troy State	
5	130	Cleveland Browns	Anthony Malbrough	CB	Texas Tech	
5	131	New Orleans Saints	Tutan Reyes	G	Ole Miss	
5	132	San Francisco 49ers	Paul Smith	RB	UTEP	from San Francisco via Green Bay (Note: No. 132: San Francisco → Green Bay → San Francisco. Multiple trades: San Francisco → Green Bay (PD). San Francisco traded a fifth-round selection (132nd overall) to Green Bay in exchange for CB Craig Newsome. Green Bay → San Francisco (D). See Round 4: San Francisco → Green Bay.)
5	133	Cincinnati Bengals	Robert Bean	CB	Mississippi State	
5	134	Atlanta Falcons	Anthony Midget	CB	Virginia Tech	
5	135	Tennessee Titans	Aric Morris	S	Michigan State	from Philadelphia (Note: No. 135: Philadelphia → Tennessee (D). See Round 2: Tennessee → Philadelphia.)
5	136	Arizona Cardinals	Mao Tosi	DT	Idaho	
5	137	Pittsburgh Steelers	Clark Haggans	LB	Colorado State	
5	138	Indianapolis Colts	Matt Johnson	C	BYU	from Chicago via New Orleans (Note: No. 138: Chicago → New Orleans → Indianapolis. Multiple trades: Chicago → New Orleans (PD). Chicago traded a fifth-round selection (138th overall) to New Orleans in exchange for WR Eddie Kennison. New Orleans → Indianapolis (D). New Orleans traded a fifth-round selection (138th overall) to Indianapolis in exchange for fifth- and sixth-round selections (158th and 195th overall).)
5	139	St. Louis Rams	Brian Young	DT	UTEP	from Denver (Note: No. 139: Denver → St. Louis (PD). Denver traded a fifth-round selection (139th overall) and a 2001 fifth-round selection to St. Louis in exchange for S Billy Jenkins.)
5	140	New York Giants	Ralph Brown	CB	Nebraska	
5	141	New England Patriots	Dave Stachelski	TE	Boise State	
5	142	Oakland Raiders	Shane Lechler ^{†}	P	Texas A&M	
5	143	New York Jets	Windrell Hayes	WR	USC	
5	144	Dallas Cowboys	Michael Wiley	RB	Ohio State	
5	145	Detroit Lions	Todd Franz	S	Tulsa	
5^	146	Cleveland Browns	Lamar Chapman	CB	Kansas State	
5	147	Carolina Panthers	Gillis Wilson	DE	Southern	
5	148	Baltimore Ravens	Richard Mercier	G	Miami (FL)	from San Diego (Note: No. 148: San Diego → Baltimore (PD). San Diego traded a fifth-round selection (148th overall) to Baltimore in exchange for QB Jim Harbaugh.)
5	149	Green Bay Packers	Kabeer Gbaja-Biamila ^{†}	DE	San Diego State	
5	150	San Francisco 49ers	John Milem	DE	Lenoir–Rhyne	from Baltimore via Detroit, St. Louis and Chicago (Note: No. 150: Baltimore → Detroit → St. Louis → Chicago → San Francisco. Multiple trades: Baltimore → Detroit (PD). Baltimore traded a fifth-round selection (150th overall) and a 1999 third-round selection to Detroit in exchange for QB Scott Mitchell. Detroit → St. Louis (PD). Detroit traded fifth- and seventh-round selections (150th and 220th) to St. Louis in exchange for RB Greg Hill. St. Louis → Chicago (D). See Round 4: Chicago → St. Louis. Chicago → San Francisco (D). Chicago traded a fifth-round selection (150th overall) to San Francisco in exchange for sixth- and seventh-round selections (170th and 209th overall).)
5	151	Green Bay Packers	Joey Jamison	WR	Texas Southern	from Seattle (Note: No. 151: Seattle → Green Bay (PD). Seattle traded a fifth-round selection (151st overall) and RB Ahman Green to Green Bay in exchange for a sixth-round selection (185th overall) and CB Fred Vinson.)
5	152	Miami Dolphins	Arturo Freeman	S	South Carolina	
5	153	Kansas City Chiefs	Dante Hall ^{†}	WR	Texas A&M	
5	154	Denver Broncos	Muneer Moore	WR	Richmond	from Washington via San Francisco and Seattle (Note: No. 154: Washington → San Francisco → Seattle → Denver. Multiple trades: Washington → San Francisco (D). See Round 1: San Francisco → Washington. San Francisco → Seattle (D). See Round 3: Seattle → San Francisco. Seattle → Denver (D). Seattle traded a fifth-round selection (154th overall) to Denver in exchange for sixth- and seventh-round selections (175th and 231st overall).)
5	155	Washington Redskins	Quincy Sanders	S	UNLV	from Minnesota (Note: No. 155: Minnesota → Washington (PD). Minnesota sent a fifth-round selection (155th overall) to Washington as compensation for signing restricted free agent OL Brad Badger.)
5	156	Buffalo Bills	Sammy Morris	FB	Texas Tech	
5	157	Tampa Bay Buccaneers	James Whalen	TE	Kentucky	
5	158	New Orleans Saints	Austin Wheatley	TE	Iowa	from Indianapolis (Note: No. 158: Indianapolis → New Orleans (D). See Round 5: New Orleans → Indianapolis.)
5	159	Jacksonville Jaguars	Kiwaukee Thomas	CB	Georgia Southern	
5	160	Tennessee Titans	Frank Chamberlin	LB	Boston College	
5	161	New England Patriots	Jeff Marriott	G	Missouri	from St. Louis (Note: No. 161: St. Louis → New England (PD). St. Louis traded a fifth-round selection (161st overall) to New England in exchange for DE Mike Jones.)
5*	162	Kansas City Chiefs	Pat Dennis	CB	Louisiana–Monroe	
5*	163	Pittsburgh Steelers	Tee Martin	QB	Tennessee	
5*	164	Arizona Cardinals	Jay Tant	TE	Northwestern	
5*	165	Minnesota Vikings	Troy Walters	WR	Stanford	
5*	166	New Orleans Saints	Chad Morton	RB	USC	
6	167	Miami Dolphins	Ernest Grant	DT	Arkansas–Pine Bluff	from Cleveland (Note: No. 167: Cleveland → Miami (PD). Cleveland traded a sixth-round selection (167th overall) and a conditional 2001 fifth-round selection to Miami in exchange for RB Karim Abdul-Jabbar.)
6	168	New Orleans Saints	Marc Bulger ^{†}	QB	West Virginia	
6	169	Cincinnati Bengals	Neil Rackers ^{†}	K	Illinois	
6	170	Chicago Bears	Frank Murphy	WR	Kansas State	from San Francisco (Note: No. 170: San Francisco → Chicago (D). See Round 5: Chicago → San Francisco.)
6	171	Philadelphia Eagles	Thomas Hamner	RB	Minnesota	
6	172	Atlanta Falcons	Mareno Philyaw	WR	Troy State	
6	173	Pittsburgh Steelers	Chris Combs	DE	Duke	
6	174	Chicago Bears	Paul Edinger	K	Michigan State	
6	175	Seattle Seahawks	James Williams	WR	Marshall	from Denver (Note: No. 175: Denver → Seattle (D). See Round 5: Seattle → Denver.)
6	176	Arizona Cardinals	Jabari Issa	DE	Washington	
6	177	New York Giants	Dhani Jones	LB	Michigan	
6	178	Philadelphia Eagles	John Frank	DE	Utah	from Oakland (Note: No. 178: Oakland → Philadelphia (PD). Oakland traded a sixth-round selection (178th overall) to Philadelphia in exchange for QB Bobby Hoying.)
6	179	New York Jets	Tony Scott	CB	NC State	
6	180	Dallas Cowboys	Mario Edwards	CB	Florida State	
6	181	Detroit Lions	Quinton Reese	DE	Auburn	
6	182	Carolina Panthers	Jeno James	G	Auburn	
6^	183	Cleveland Browns	Spergon Wynn	QB	Southwest Texas State	
6	184	San Diego Chargers	Shannon Taylor	LB	Virginia	
6	185	Seattle Seahawks	Tim Watson	DT	Rowan	from Green Bay (Note: No. 185: Green Bay → Seattle (PD). See Round 5: Seattle → Green Bay.)
6	186	Baltimore Ravens	Adalius Thomas ^{†}	LB	Southern Miss	
6	187	New England Patriots	Antwan Harris	S	Virginia	
6	188	Kansas City Chiefs	Darnell Alford	G	Boston College	from Miami (Note: No. 188: Miami → Kansas City (PD). Miami traded a sixth-round selection (188th overall) and 1999 second- and third-round selections to Kansas City in exchange for a 1999 second-round selection.)
6	189	Denver Broncos	Mike Anderson	RB	Utah	from Kansas City via St. Louis (Note: No. 189: Kansas City → St. Louis → Denver. Multiple trades: Kansas City → St. Louis (PD). Kansas City traded a sixth-round selection (189th overall) to St. Louis in exchange for TE Mitch Jacoby. St. Louis → Denver (D). St. Louis traded a sixth-round selection (189th overall) to Denver in exchange for RB Derek Loville.)
6	190	Seattle Seahawks	John Hilliard	DT	Mississippi State	
6	191	Baltimore Ravens	Cedric Woodard	DT	Texas	from Minnesota (Note: No. 191: Minnesota → Baltimore (PD). See Round 4: Baltimore → Minnesota.)
6	192	Philadelphia Eagles	John Romero	C	California	from Washington (Note: No. 192: Washington → Philadelphia (PD). Washington traded a sixth-round selection (188th overall) to Philadelphia in exchange for QB Rodney Peete.)
6	193	Tampa Bay Buccaneers	David Gibson	S	USC	
6	194	Buffalo Bills	Leif Olve Dolonen Larsen	DE	UTEP	
6	195	New Orleans Saints	Michael Hawthorne	S	Purdue	from Indianapolis (Note: No. 195: Indianapolis → New Orleans (D). See Round 5: New Orleans → Indianapolis.)
6	196	Jacksonville Jaguars	Emanuel Smith	WR	Arkansas	
6	197	Tennessee Titans	Robaire Smith	DT	Michigan State	
6	198	St. Louis Rams	Matt Bowen	S	Iowa	
6*	199	New England Patriots	Tom Brady ^{†}	QB	Michigan	
6*	200	New Orleans Saints	Sherrod Gideon	WR	Southern Miss	
6*	201	New England Patriots	David Nugent	DE	Purdue	
6*	202	Washington Redskins	Todd Husak	QB	Stanford	
6*	203	San Diego Chargers	Damen Wheeler	CB	Colorado	
6*	204	Pittsburgh Steelers	Jason Gavadza	TE	Kent State	
6*	205	San Diego Chargers	Ja'Juan Seider	QB	Florida A&M	
6*	206	Cleveland Browns	Brad Bedell	T	Colorado	
7	207	Cleveland Browns	Manuia Savea	G	Arizona	
7	208	Kansas City Chiefs	Desmond Kitchings	WR	Furman	from New Orleans (Note: No. 208: New Orleans → Kansas City (PD). New Orleans traded a seventh-round selection (208th overall) to Kansas City in exchange for a seventh-round selection (228th overall) as compensation for hiring defensive backs coach Ron Zook as defensive coordinator.)
7	209	Cleveland Browns	Eric Chandler	DE	Jackson State	from San Francisco via Chicago (Note: No. 209: San Francisco → Chicago → Cleveland. Multiple trades: San Francisco → Chicago (D). See Round 5: Chicago → San Francisco. Chicago → Cleveland (D). Chicago traded two seventh-round selections (209th and 225th overall) to Cleveland in exchange for three seventh-round selections (223rd, 232nd and 254th overall).)
7	210	Cincinnati Bengals	Brad St. Louis	LS	Southwest Missouri State	
7	211	Atlanta Falcons	Darrick Vaughn	CB	Southwest Texas State	
7	212	San Francisco 49ers	Tim Rattay	QB	Louisiana Tech	from Philadelphia via New England (Note: No. 212: Philadelphia → New England → San Francisco. Multiple trades: Philadelphia → New England (PD). Philadelphia traded a seventh-round selection (212th overall) to New England in exchange for WR Dietrich Jells. New England → San Francisco (D). New England traded a seventh-round selection (212th overall) to San Francisco in exchange for a 2001 sixth-round selection.)
7	213	Tennessee Titans	Mike Green	FB	Houston	from Chicago (Note: No. 213: Chicago → Tennessee (PD). Chicago traded a seventh-round selection (213th overall) to Tennessee in exchange for LB Lemanski Hall.)
7	214	Denver Broncos	Jarious Jackson	QB	Notre Dame	
7	215	Arizona Cardinals	Sekou Sanyika	LB	California	
7	216	Washington Redskins	Delbert Cowsette	DT	Maryland	from Pittsburgh (Note: No. 216: Pittsburgh → Washington (PD). Pittsburgh traded a seventh-round selection (216th overall) to Washington in exchange for OT Shar Pourdanesh.)
7	217	New York Giants	Jeremiah Parker	DE	California	
7	218	New York Jets	Richard Seals	DT	Utah	
7	219	Dallas Cowboys	Orantes Grant	LB	Georgia	
7	220	St. Louis Rams	Andrew Kline	G	San Diego State	from Detroit (Note: No. 220: Detroit → St. Louis (PD). See Round 5: Detroit → St. Louis.)
7	221	Carolina Panthers	Lester Towns	LB	Washington	
7	222	San Diego Chargers	Jason Thomas	G	Hampton	
7^	223	Chicago Bears	James Cotton	DE	Ohio State	from Cleveland (Note: No. 223: Cleveland → Chicago (D). See Round 7: Chicago → Cleveland.)
7	224	Green Bay Packers	Mark Tauscher	T	Wisconsin	
7	225	Cleveland Browns	Rashidi Barnes	S	Colorado	from Baltimore via St. Louis and Chicago (Note: No. 225: Baltimore → St. Louis → Chicago. Multiple trades: Baltimore → St. Louis (PD). Baltimore traded a seventh-round selection (225th overall) and a 1999 fifth-round selection to St. Louis in exchange for QB Tony Banks. St. Louis → Chicago (D). See Round 4: Chicago → St. Louis. Chicago → Cleveland (D). No. 209: Chicago → Cleveland.)
7	226	New England Patriots	Casey Tisdale	DE	New Mexico	
7	227	Oakland Raiders	Mondriel Fulcher	TE	Miami (FL)	
7	228	New Orleans Saints	Kevin Houser	LS	Ohio State	from Kansas City (Note: No. 228: Kansas City → New Orleans (PD). See Round 7: New Orleans → Kansas City.)
7	229	Green Bay Packers	Ron Moore	DT	Northwestern Oklahoma State	from Seattle (Note: No. 229: Seattle → Green Bay (PD). Seattle traded a seventh-round selection (229th overall) to Green Bay in exchange for WR Derrick Mayes.)
7	230	San Francisco 49ers	Brian Jennings ^{†}	LS	Arizona State	from Miami (Note: No. 230: Miami → San Francisco (PD). Miami traded a seventh-round selection (230th overall) to San Francisco in exchange for QB Jim Druckenmiller.)
7	231	Oakland Raiders	Cliffton Black	S	Southwest Texas State	from Washington via Denver and Seattle (Note: No. 231: Washington → Denver → Seattle → Oakland. Multiple trades: Washington → Denver (PD). Washington traded a seventh-round selection (231st overall) and a 2001 seventh-round selection to Denver in exchange for CB Tito Paul. Denver → Seattle (D). See Round 5: Seattle → Denver. Seattle → Oakland (D). Seattle traded a seventh-round selection (231st overall) to Oakland in exchange for a 2001 sixth-round selection.)
7	232	Miami Dolphins	Jeff Harris	CB	Georgia	from Minnesota via Cleveland and Chicago (Note: No. 232: Minnesota → Cleveland → Chicago → Miami. Multiple trades: Minnesota → Cleveland (PD). Minnesota traded a seventh-round selection (232nd overall) and DT Stalin Colinet to Cleveland in exchange for DT Jerry Ball. Cleveland → Chicago (D). See Round 7: Chicago → Cleveland. Chicago → Miami (D). Chicago traded a seventh-round selection (232nd overall) and a 2001 seventh-round selection to Miami in exchange for P Brent Bartholomew.)
7	233	Buffalo Bills	Drew Haddad	WR	Buffalo	
7	234	Tampa Bay Buccaneers	Joe Hamilton	QB	Georgia Tech	
7	235	Indianapolis Colts	Rob Renes	DT	Michigan	
7	236	Jacksonville Jaguars	Erik Olson	S	Colorado State	
7	237	Tennessee Titans	Wes Shivers	G	Mississippi State	
7	238	Indianapolis Colts	Rodregis Brooks	CB	UAB	from St. Louis via Oakland (Note: No. 238: St. Louis → Oakland → Indianapolis. Multiple trades: St. Louis → Oakland (PD). St. Louis traded a seventh-round selection (238th overall) to Oakland in exchange for QB Paul Justin. Oakland → Indianapolis (D). Oakland traded a seventh-round selection (238th overall) to Indianapolis in exchange for a 2001 sixth-round selection.)
7*	239	New England Patriots	Patrick Pass	FB	Georgia	
7*	240	Minnesota Vikings	Mike Malano	C	San Diego State	
7*	241	Jacksonville Jaguars	Rob Meier	DT	Washington State	
7*	242	Green Bay Packers	Charles Lee	WR	UCF	
7*	243	Jacksonville Jaguars	Shyrone Stith	RB	Virginia Tech	
7*	244	Minnesota Vikings	Giles Cole	TE	Texas A&M–Kingsville	
7*	245	Jacksonville Jaguars	Danny Clark	LB	Illinois	
7*	246	Denver Broncos	Leroy Fields	WR	Jackson State	
7*	247	Jacksonville Jaguars	Mark Baniewicz	T	Syracuse	
7*	248	Minnesota Vikings	Lewis Kelly	G	South Carolina State	
7*	249	Green Bay Packers	Eugene McCaslin	LB	Florida	
7*	250	Washington Redskins	Ethan Howell	WR	Oklahoma State	
7*	251	Buffalo Bills	DaShon Polk	LB	Arizona	
7*	252	Green Bay Packers	Rondell Mealey	RB	LSU	
7*	253	Detroit Lions	Alfonso Boone	DT	Mt. San Antonio	
7^	254	Chicago Bears	Mike Green	S	Northwestern State	from Cleveland (Note: No. 254: Cleveland → Chicago (D). See Round 7: Chicago → Cleveland.)

== Trades ==
In the explanations below, (D) denotes trades that took place during the 2000 Draft, while (PD) indicates trades completed pre-draft.

Round 1

Round 2

Round 3

Round 4

Round 5

Round 6

Round 7

== Notable undrafted players ==
†	Pro Bowler

Original NFL team	Player	Pos.	College	Notes
Arizona Cardinals	Deke Cooper	S	Notre Dame	
Arizona Cardinals	Bryan Gilmore	WR	Midwestern State	
Arizona Cardinals	Jason Starkey	C	Marshall	
Atlanta Falcons	Jake Arians	K	UAB	
Atlanta Falcons	Doug Johnson	QB	Florida	
Atlanta Falcons	Derek Rackley	LS	Minnesota	
Atlanta Falcons	Maurice Smith	RB	North Carolina A&T	
Baltimore Ravens	Jason Brookins	RB	Lane	
Baltimore Ravens	John James	TE	IUP	
Buffalo Bills	Jon Carman	T	Georgia Tech	
Buffalo Bills	Dustin Cohen	LB	Miami (OH)	
Buffalo Bills	Fred Jones	LB	Colorado	
Buffalo Bills	Kenyatta Wright	LB	Oklahoma State	
Carolina Panthers	Casey Crawford	TE	Virginia	
Carolina Panthers	Ray Green	CB	South Carolina	
Carolina Panthers	Michael Hawkes	LB	Virginia Tech	
Carolina Panthers	Brad Hoover	FB	Western Carolina	
Carolina Panthers	Paris Lenon	S	Richmond	
Carolina Panthers	Al Lucas	DT	Troy State	
Carolina Panthers	Giradie Mercer	DT	Marshall	
Chicago Bears	Marlion Jackson	RB	Saginaw Valley State	
Chicago Bears	Ahmad Merritt	WR	Wisconsin	
Cincinnati Bengals	LaVell Boyd	WR	Louisville	
Cincinnati Bengals	Armegis Spearman	LB	Ole Miss	
Cleveland Browns	Noel LaMontagne	T	Virginia	
Cleveland Browns	Shaun O'Hara ^{†}	C	Rutgers	
Cleveland Browns	Kevin Thompson	QB	Penn State	
Dallas Cowboys	Aaron Fields	DE	Troy State	
Dallas Cowboys	Troy Hambrick	RB	Savannah State	
Dallas Cowboys	Jon Hilbert	K	Louisville	
Dallas Cowboys	Damon Hodge	WR	Alabama State	
Dallas Cowboys	Alcender Jackson	G	LSU	
Dallas Cowboys	Micah Knorr	P	Utah State	
Dallas Cowboys	Rian Lindell	K	Washington State	
Dallas Cowboys	Chad Slaughter	T	Alcorn State	
Dallas Cowboys	Clint Stoerner	QB	Arkansas	
Denver Broncos	KaRon Coleman	RB	Stephen F. Austin	
Denver Broncos	Bashir Yamini	WR	Iowa	
Detroit Lions	Larry Foster	WR	LSU	
Detroit Lions	James Hall	DE	Michigan	
Detroit Lions	Jimmy Wyrick	CB	Minnesota	
Green Bay Packers	Bobby Brown	TE	Notre Dame	
Green Bay Packers	Herbert Goodman	RB	Graceland	
Indianapolis Colts	John Baker	P	North Texas	
Indianapolis Colts	Joe Dean Davenport	TE	Arkansas	
Indianapolis Colts	Mike Furrey	WR	Northern Iowa	
Indianapolis Colts	Steve Gleason	S	Washington State	
Indianapolis Colts	Trevor Insley	WR	Nevada	
Indianapolis Colts	Kevin McDougal	RB	Colorado State	
Indianapolis Colts	Justin Snow	LS	Baylor	
Indianapolis Colts	Jamel White	RB	South Dakota	
Jacksonville Jaguars	John Waerig	TE	Maryland	
Kansas City Chiefs	Chris Horn	WR	Rocky Mountain	
Kansas City Chiefs	Jonathan Jackson	LB	Oregon State	
Kansas City Chiefs	Norris McCleary	DT	East Carolina	
Kansas City Chiefs	Kirk McMullen	TE	Pittsburgh	
Kansas City Chiefs	Andre O'Neal	LB	Marshall	
Miami Dolphins	Trent Gamble	S	Wyoming	
Miami Dolphins	Tommy Hendricks	LB	Michigan	
Miami Dolphins	Steve Herndon	G	Georgia	
Miami Dolphins	Adewale Ogunleye ^{†}	DE	Indiana	
Miami Dolphins	Jay Taylor	K	West Virginia	
Minnesota Vikings	Brody Liddiard	LS	Colorado	
New England Patriots	Shockmain Davis	WR	Angelo State	
New England Patriots	Chris Eitzmann	TE	Harvard	
New England Patriots	Lonie Paxton	LS	Sacramento State	
New England Patriots	Maugaula Tuitele	LB	Colorado State	
New Orleans Saints	Jamal Brooks	LB	Hampton	
New Orleans Saints	Shayne Graham ^{†}	K	Virginia Tech	
New Orleans Saints	Michael Lewis	WR	N/A	
New Orleans Saints	Blaine Saipaia	T	Colorado State	
New York Giants	Chris Bober	C	Nebraska–Omaha	
New York Giants	Darnell Dinkins	TE	Pittsburgh	
New York Giants	Jack Golden	LB	Oklahoma State	
New York Giants	Kevin Lewis	LB	Duke	
New York Giants	Chris Ziemann	T	Michigan	
New York Jets	Jake Moreland	FB/TE	Western Michigan	
New York Jets	Kelvin Moses	LB	Wake Forest	
Oakland Raiders	Brandon Jennings	CB	Texas A&M	
Oakland Raiders	Marcus Knight	WR/KR	Michigan	
Philadelphia Eagles	Travis Brown	QB	Northern Arizona	
Philadelphia Eagles	Clinton Hart	S	UCF	
Pittsburgh Steelers	Ainsley Battles	S	Vanderbilt	
Pittsburgh Steelers	Joey Goodspeed	FB	Notre Dame	
Pittsburgh Steelers	Hank Fraley	C	Robert Morris	
Pittsburgh Steelers	Dan Kreider	FB	New Hampshire	
Pittsburgh Steelers	Donnel Thompson	LB	Wisconsin	
San Diego Chargers	Ronney Jenkins	RB	Northern Arizona	
San Diego Chargers	Rod Smart	RB	Western Kentucky	
San Diego Chargers	Leonard Stephens	TE	Howard	
San Francisco 49ers	Ronnie Heard	S	Ole Miss	
San Francisco 49ers	Cedric Killings	DT	Carson–Newman	
San Francisco 49ers	Jason Lamar	LB	Toledo	
San Francisco 49ers	Jonas Lewis	RB	San Diego State	
San Francisco 49ers	James Tuthill	K	Cal Poly	
Seattle Seahawks	Kris Heppner	K	Montana	
St. Louis Rams	Bennie Anderson	G	Tennessee State	
St. Louis Rams	Dane Looker	WR	Washington	
Tampa Bay Buccaneers	Sean McDermott	LS/TE	Kansas	
Tampa Bay Buccaneers	Earthwind Moreland	CB	Georgia Southern	
Tampa Bay Buccaneers	Todd Yoder	TE	Vanderbilt	
Tennessee Titans	Mike Leach	LS	William & Mary	
Tennessee Titans	Billy Volek	QB	Fresno State	
Washington Redskins	Jerry DeLoach	DE	California	
Washington Redskins	Zeron Flemister	TE	Iowa	
Washington Redskins	Bryan Johnson	FB	Boise State	
Washington Redskins	Josh Symonette	S	Tennessee Tech	

== Hall of Famers ==
- Brian Urlacher, linebacker from New Mexico, taken 1st round 9th overall by the Chicago Bears.

Inducted: Professional Football Hall of Fame Class of 2018.

== References and notes ==
Notes

Trade references

General references
