= Buddy Green =

Bud(dy) Green(e) may refer to:

- Bud Green (1897–1981), Austrian-born songwriter
- Buddy Green (American football), American football coach
- Buddy Greene, American musician
