= Dan Robinson (quarterback) =

Former American football quarterback

Profile
- Position: Quarterback

Personal information
- Listed height: 6 ft 4 in (1.93 m)
- Listed weight: 205 lb (93 kg)

Career information
- College: Ricks College (1996); Hawaii (1997–1999)

Dan Robinson (born c 1978) is a former American football quarterback. He played for Hawaii, ranking second in the country in 1999 with 3,853 passing yards.

Robinson grew up on a farm near American Fork, Utah and won a reputation as "Mr. Clean", a player who had never smoked or tasted alcohol. He began his college career at Ricks College in Idaho. He then played college football for the Hawaii Rainbow Warriors from 1997 to 1999.

After a winless 0–12 season in 1998, Robinson led the 1999 Hawaii Rainbow Warriors football team to a 9–4 record, a conference championship, and a victory over Oregon State in the 1999 Oahu Bowl. On November 20, 1999, he set 11 school records, including 530 passing yards in a game, in a 48-41 victory over Navy. He ranked among the leading quarterbacks in major-college football in 1999 with 3,853 passing yards (2nd), 556 pass attempts (1st), 616 total plays (1st), 321.1 yards gained per game played (4th), 18 passing interceptions (3rd), and 28 passing touchdowns (8th).
