= 1999 VMI Keydets football team =

American college football season

1999 VMI Keydets football
- Conference: Southern Conference
- Record: 1–10 (0–8 SoCon)
- Head coach: Cal McCombs (1st season)
- Offensive coordinator: Bob Gatling (1st season)
- Home stadium: Alumni Memorial Field

1999 Southern Conference football standings
	Conf.			Overall
Team	W		L	W		L
No. 1 Georgia Southern $^	7	–	1	13	–	2
No. 9 Appalachian State ^	7	–	1	9	–	3
No. 12 Furman ^	7	–	1	9	–	3
Wofford	5	–	3	6	–	5
East Tennessee State	4	–	4	6	–	5
Chattanooga	3	–	5	5	–	6
Western Carolina	2	–	6	3	–	8
The Citadel	1	–	7	2	–	9
VMI	0	–	8	1	–	10
$ – Conference champion; ^ – NCAA Division I-AA playoff participant; Rankings from The Sports Network I-AA Poll

The 1999 VMI Keydets football team represented the Virginia Military Institute during the 1999 NCAA Division I-AA football season. It was the Keydets' 109th year of football and first season under head coach Cal McCombs, who replaced Ted Cain following the conclusion of the 1998 season.

VMI went 1–10 on the year, beating only Division II-Concord University, a 15–14 win. The Keydet offense was shut out three times and managed only 77 points all season, averaging 7.0 points per game.

== Schedule ==
Date	Time	Opponent	Site	Result	Attendance	Source
September 4	7:00 pm	at Richmond*	University of Richmond Stadium; Richmond, VA (rivalry)	L 6–42	13,682	
September 11	1:00 pm	Concord*	Alumni Memorial Field; Lexington, VA	W 15–14	5,682	
September 18	1:00 pm	No. 25 East Tennessee State	Alumni Memorial Field; Lexington, VA	L 17–26	7,149	
September 25	7:00 pm	at No. 12 Furman	Paladin Stadium; Greenville, SC	L 0–58	11,212	
October 2	1:00 pm	No. 1 Georgia Southern	Alumni Memorial Field; Lexington, VA	L 0–62	5,967	
October 9	1:30 pm	at Wofford	Gibbs Stadium; Spartanburg, SC	L 10–55	7,341	
October 16	1:00 pm	Chattanooga	Alumni Memorial Field; Lexington, VA	L 0–27	5,327	
October 23	1:00 pm	William & Mary*	Alumni Memorial Field; Lexington, VA (rivalry)	L 14–35	5,273	
October 30	2:00 pm	at Western Carolina	E. J. Whitmire Stadium; Cullowhee, NC	L 2–40	8,978	
November 6	1:00 pm	No. 9 Appalachian State	Alumni Memorial Field; Lexington, VA	L 7–34	4,710	
November 13	1:00 pm	at The Citadel	Johnson Hagood Stadium; Charleston, SC (Military Classic of the South)	L 6–7	16,663	
*Non-conference game; Rankings from The Sports Network Poll released prior to the game; All times are in Eastern time
