= Jacoby Shepherd =

American gridiron football player (born 1979)

No. 22, 38, 32, 11
- Position: Cornerback

Personal information
- Born: August 31, 1979 (age 47); Lufkin, Texas, U.S.
- Listed height: 6 ft 1 in (1.85 m)
- Listed weight: 192 lb (87 kg)

Career information
- High school: Lufkin
- College: Oklahoma State
- NFL draft: 2000: 2nd round, 62nd overall pick

Career history
- St. Louis Rams (2000–2001); Houston Texans (2002)*; Green Bay Packers (2002); New York Jets (2003); Detroit Lions (2003); Oakland Raiders (2004)*; Edmonton Eskimos (2005)*; Calgary Stampeders (2005); Dallas Desperados (2006–2007); Utah Blaze (2007); Georgia Force (2008)
- * Offseason or practice squad member only

Career NFL statistics
- Tackles: 7
- Interceptions: 1
- Stats at Pro Football Reference

Career AFL statistics
- Tackles: 56
- Interceptions: 3
- Pass deflections: 2
- Forced fumbles: 1
- Stats at ArenaFan.com

Jacoby Lamar Shepherd (born August 31, 1979) is an American former professional gridiron football player who was a cornerback in the National Football League (NFL) and Canadian Football League (CFL). He played college football for the Oklahoma State Cowboys and was selected in the second round of the 2000 NFL draft by the St. Louis Rams.

Shepherd was also a member of the Houston Texans, Green Bay Packers, New York Jets, Detroit Lions, Oakland Raiders, Edmonton Eskimos, Calgary Stampeders, Dallas Desperados, Utah Blaze and Georgia Force.

== Early life ==
Shepherd was born on August 31, 1979, in Lufkin, Texas. He played high school football at Lufkin High School in Texas, where he was a star football player, track athlete and basketball player. He played at both wide receiver and cornerback in high school.

== College career ==
=== Tyler Junior College ===
In 1996, Shepherd recorded 40 tackles, one sack and four interceptions as a freshman at Tyler. After the season, he was named Co-Defensive player of the year. As a sophomore in 1997 he was named All-Southwest Junior College.

=== Oklahoma State ===
After 1997, Shepherd transferred to Oklahoma State University. During his junior year in 1998, he started two games and had 22 tackles, six pass deflections and two interceptions.

== Professional career ==
=== Pre-draft ===
Pre-draft measurables
Height	Weight	40-yard dash	10-yard split	20-yard split	Vertical jump	Broad jump	Bench press
6 ft 1 1/2 in (1.87 m)	195 lb (88 kg)	4.53 s	1.56 s	2.61 s	35 in (0.89 m)	10 ft 0 in (3.05 m)	5 reps
All from NFL Combine.

=== National Football League ===
Shepherd was drafted by the St. Louis Rams in the second round of the 2000 NFL draft. As a rookie, he played in 15 games and recorded one interception. During the 2001 off season, he was hampered by a hamstring injury. On October 3, 2001, Shepherd was fined by the NFL, along with eight other Rams players for uniform violations. In a practice on October 25, Shepherd and teammate Yo Murphy got into a heated fight, which included punches being thrown and facemask grabbing. kicking the other players sook For the rest of the season, he suffered from a quadriceps injury. He recorded three tackles during the 2001 season. When the Houston Texans were to become the 32nd team in the NFL, each team was required to put five players onto an "expansion list", Shepherd was one of the five Rams on the list.

On March 28, 2002, the Houston Texans traded a conditional draft pick in the 2003 NFL draft to the Rams in return for Shepherd. Shepherd was waived by the Texans on September 2, 2002. Shepherd signed with the Green Bay Packers on January 1, 2003. He was waived on August 26, 2003.

The New York Jets signed Shepherd on August 30, 2003. In four games with the Jets, Shepherd had two tackles. After being tried at dimeback, Shepherd was waived on October 1, 2003. Shepherd signed with the Detroit Lions on October 29, 2003. He was waived on November 25. With the Lions, Shepherd played in four games and had two tackles. On April 14, 2004, Shepherd signed with the Oakland Raiders. He was released on August 13.

=== Canadian Football League ===
Shepherd spent time with the Edmonton Eskimos during their 2005 training camp.

The Calgary Stampeders signed Shepherd on June 16, 2005. He was cut on June 18.

=== Arena Football League ===
After being released by Calgary, Shepherd joined the Dallas Desperados. In his first year with Dallas, he had 10.5 tackles, one interception and one forced fumble.

On May 3, 2007, at the Arena Football League's trade deadline, Shepherd was traded to the Utah Blaze. With the Blaze he recorded 44.5 tackles and two pass breakups.

== Personal life ==
Shepherd resides in St George,
