= 1999 Appalachian State Mountaineers football team =

American college football season

1999 Appalachian State Mountaineers football

SoCon co-champion

NCAA Division I-AA First Round, L 29–44 vs. Florida A&M
- Conference: Southern Conference

Ranking
- Sports Network: No. 9
- Record: 9–3 (7–1 SoCon)
- Head coach: Jerry Moore (11th season)
- Home stadium: Kidd Brewer Stadium

1999 Southern Conference football standings
	Conf.			Overall
Team	W		L	W		L
No. 1 Georgia Southern +^	7	–	1	13	–	2
No. 9 Appalachian State +^	7	–	1	9	–	3
No. 12 Furman +^	7	–	1	9	–	3
Wofford	5	–	3	6	–	5
East Tennessee State	4	–	4	6	–	5
Chattanooga	3	–	5	5	–	6
Western Carolina	2	–	6	3	–	8
The Citadel	1	–	7	2	–	9
VMI	0	–	8	1	–	10
+ – Conference co-champions; ^ – NCAA Division I-AA playoff participant; Rankings from The Sports Network poll

The 1999 Appalachian State Mountaineers football team was an American football team that represented Appalachian State University as a member of the Southern Conference (SoCon) during the 1999 NCAA Division I-AA football season. In their 11th year under head coach Jerry Moore, the Mountaineers compiled an overall record of 9–3, with a conference mark of 7–1, and finished as SoCon co-champion. Appalachian State advanced to the NCAA Division I-AA Football Championship playoffs, where they were upset by Florida A&M in the first round.

== Schedule ==
Date	Opponent	Rank	Site	Result	Attendance	Source
September 4	at Auburn*	No. 4	Jordan–Hare Stadium; Auburn, AL	L 15–22	78,128	
September 11	No. 23 Eastern Kentucky*	No. 4	Kidd Brewer Stadium; Boone, NC	W 34–20	14,861	
September 25	at The Citadel	No. 3	Johnson Hagood Stadium; Charleston, SC	W 51–0	12,539	
October 2	No. 13 East Tennessee State	No. 3	Kidd Brewer Stadium; Boone, NC	W 23–19	24,343	
October 9	at No. 25 Furman	No. 3	Paladin Stadium; Greenville, SC	L 21–35	13,052	
October 16	No. 1 Georgia Southern	No. 11	Kidd Brewer Stadium; Boone, NC (rivalry)	W 17–16	19,891	
October 23	at Wofford	No. 6	Gibbs Stadium; Spartanburg, SC	W 21–20	8,249	
October 30	Chattanooga	No. 6	Kidd Brewer Stadium; Boone, NC	W 62–14	13,711	
November 6	at VMI	No. 6	Alumni Memorial Field; Lexington, VA	W 34–7	4,710	
November 13	Western Carolina	No. 5	Kidd Brewer Stadium; Boone, NC (rivalry)	W 34–10	18,971	
November 20	at Liberty*	No. 3	Williams Stadium; Lynchburg, VA	W 28–12	7,313	
November 27	No. 13 Florida A&M*	No. 4	Kidd Brewer Stadium; Boone, NC (NCAA Division I-AA First Round)	L 29–44	6,837	
*Non-conference game; Rankings from The Sports Network Poll released prior to the game
