= 1999 Louisiana–Lafayette Ragin' Cajuns football team =

American college football season

1999 Louisiana–Lafayette Ragin' Cajuns football
- Conference: Independent
- Record: 2–9
- Head coach: Jerry Baldwin (1st season)
- Offensive coordinator: Larry Edmondson (1st season)
- Defensive coordinator: Tony Tademy (1st season)
- Home stadium: Cajun Field

1999 NCAA Division I-A independents football records
	Conf.			Overall
Team	W		L	W		L
Louisiana Tech		–		8	–	3
Louisiana–Monroe		–		5	–	6
Notre Dame		–		5	–	7
Navy		–		5	–	7
UCF		–		4	–	7
Middle Tennessee		–		3	–	8
Louisiana–Lafayette		–		2	–	9
Rankings from AP Poll

The 1999 Louisiana–Lafayette Ragin' Cajuns football team represented the University of Louisiana at Lafayette as an independent during the 1999 NCAA Division I-A football season. Led by first-year head coach Jerry Baldwin, the Ragin' Cajuns compiled a record of 2–9. The team and played home games at Cajun Field in Lafayette, Louisiana.

== Schedule ==
Date	Opponent	Site	Result	Attendance	Source
September 4	at Oklahoma State	Lewis Field; Stillwater, OK	L 7–24	36,028	
September 11	Texas Tech	Cajun Field; Lafayette, LA	L 17–38	18,182	
September 18	at Houston	Robertson Stadium; Houston, TX	L 0–45	15,686	
September 25	Middle Tennessee	Cajun Field; Lafayette, LA	W 45–31	14,621	
October 2	Louisiana Tech	Cajun Field; Lafayette, LA (rivalry)	L 31–41	19,724	
October 9	at Washington State	Martin Stadium; Pullman, WA	L 0–44	23,276	
October 16	at Tulane	Louisiana Superdome; New Orleans, LA	L 32–48	24,407	
October 23	Louisiana–Monroe	Malone Stadium; Monroe, LA (Battle on the Bayou)	L 7–31	17,034	
October 30	at Arkansas State	Indian Stadium; Jonesboro, AR	L 27–31	10,029	
November 13	at No. 21 Southern Miss	M. M. Roberts Stadium; Hattiesburg, MS	L 0–48	24,133	
November 20	Wofford	Cajun Field; Lafayette, LA	W 37–34 ^{OT}		
Rankings from AP Poll released prior to the game
