= 1999 East Tennessee State Buccaneers football team =

American college football season

1999 East Tennessee State Buccaneers football
- Conference: Southern Conference
- Record: 6–5 (4–4 SoCon)
- Head coach: Paul Hamilton (3rd season)
- Home stadium: Memorial Center

1999 Southern Conference football standings
	Conf.			Overall
Team	W		L	W		L
No. 1 Georgia Southern $^	7	–	1	13	–	2
No. 9 Appalachian State ^	7	–	1	9	–	3
No. 12 Furman ^	7	–	1	9	–	3
Wofford	5	–	3	6	–	5
East Tennessee State	4	–	4	6	–	5
Chattanooga	3	–	5	5	–	6
Western Carolina	2	–	6	3	–	8
The Citadel	1	–	7	2	–	9
VMI	0	–	8	1	–	10
$ – Conference champion; ^ – NCAA Division I-AA playoff participant; Rankings from The Sports Network I-AA Poll

The 1999 East Tennessee State Buccaneers football team was an American football team that represented East Tennessee State University as a member of the Southern Conference (SoCon) during the 1999 NCAA Division I-AA football season. Led by third-year head coach Paul Hamilton, the Buccaneers compiled and overall record of 6–5, with a mark of 4–4 in conference play, and finished fifth in the SoCon.

== Schedule ==
Date	Time	Opponent	Rank	Site	Result	Attendance	Source
September 2		The Citadel		Memorial Center; Johnson City, TN	W 28–10	7,049	
September 11		West Virginia Tech*		Memorial Center; Johnson City, TN	W 61–0		
September 18	1:00 p.m.	at VMI	No. 25	Alumni Memorial Field; Lexington, VA	W 26–17	7,149	
September 25		Western Carolina	No. 20	Memorial Center; Johnson City, TN	W 38–10	5,448	
October 2		at No. 3 Appalachian State	No. 13	Kidd Brewer Stadium; Boone, NC	L 19–23	24,343	
October 16		Liberty*	No. 13	Memorial Center; Johnson City, TN	W 24–12	8,467	
October 23		at No. 14 Furman	No. 13	Paladin Stadium; Greenville, SC	L 48–21	12,572	
October 30		No. 4 Georgia Southern	No. 19	Memorial Center; Johnson City, TN	L 6–55	5,953	
November 6	1:30 p.m.	at Wofford		Gibbs Stadium; Spartanburg, SC	L 14–38	6,816	
November 13	2:00 p.m.	Chattanooga		Memorial Center; Johnson City, TN	W 28–14	5,019	
November 20		at Middle Tennessee*		Johnny "Red" Floyd Stadium; Murfreesboro, TN	L 7–24	9,231	
*Non-conference game; Rankings from The Sports Network Poll released prior to the game; All times are in Eastern time
