= 1999 The Citadel Bulldogs football team =

American college football season

1999 The Citadel Bulldogs football
- Conference: Southern Conference
- Record: 2–9 (1–7 SoCon)
- Head coach: Don Powers (4th season)
- Offensive scheme: Option
- Home stadium: Johnson Hagood Stadium

1999 Southern Conference football standings
	Conf.			Overall
Team	W		L	W		L
No. 1 Georgia Southern +^	7	–	1	13	–	2
No. 9 Appalachian State +^	7	–	1	9	–	3
No. 12 Furman +^	7	–	1	9	–	3
Wofford	5	–	3	6	–	5
East Tennessee State	4	–	4	6	–	5
Chattanooga	3	–	5	5	–	6
Western Carolina	2	–	6	3	–	8
The Citadel	1	–	7	2	–	9
VMI	0	–	8	1	–	10
+ – Conference co-champions; ^ – NCAA Division I-AA playoff participant; Rankings from The Sports Network poll

The 1999 The Citadel Bulldogs football team represented The Citadel, The Military College of South Carolina in the 1999 NCAA Division I-AA football season. Don Powers served as head coach for the fourth season. The Bulldogs played as members of the Southern Conference and played home games at Johnson Hagood Stadium.

== Schedule ==
Date	Opponent	Site	Result	Attendance	Source
September 2	at East Tennessee State	Memorial Center; Johnson City, TN	L 10–28	7,049	
September 11	No. 11 Delaware*	Johnson Hagood Stadium; Charleston, SC	L 16–26	14,759	
September 25	No. 3 Appalachian State	Johnson Hagood Stadium; Charleston, SC	L 0–51	12,539	
October 2	South Carolina State*	Johnson Hagood Stadium; Charleston, SC	W 20–14	17,239	
October 9	at Vanderbilt*	Vanderbilt Stadium; Nashville, TN	L 0–58	17,844	
October 16	No. 18 Furman	Johnson Hagood Stadium; Charleston, SC (rivalry)	L 17–31	14,629	
October 23	at No. 5 Georgia Southern	Paulson Stadium; Statesboro, GA	L 17–34	18,536	
October 30	Wofford	Johnson Hagood Stadium; Charleston, SC (rivalry)	L 16–47	11,429	
November 6	at Chattanooga	Finley Stadium; Chattanooga, TN	L 27–30 ^{OT}	6,449	
November 13	VMI^{†}	Johnson Hagood Stadium; Charleston, SC (Military Classic of the South)	W 7–6	16,663	
November 20	at Western Carolina	E. J. Whitmire Stadium; Cullowhee, NC	L 17–24	5,622	
*Non-conference game; ^{†}Homecoming; Rankings from The Sports Network Poll released prior to the game
