= 1999 Notre Dame Fighting Irish football team =

American college football season

1999 Notre Dame Fighting Irish football
- Conference: Independent
- Record: 5–7
- Head coach: Bob Davie (3rd season)
- Offensive coordinator: Kevin Rogers (1st season)
- Offensive scheme: Option
- Defensive coordinator: Greg Mattison (3rd season)
- Base defense: 4–3
- Captain: Jarious Jackson
- Home stadium: Notre Dame Stadium

1999 NCAA Division I-A independents football records
	Conf.			Overall
Team	W		L	W		L
Louisiana Tech		–		8	–	3
Louisiana–Monroe		–		5	–	6
Notre Dame		–		5	–	7
Navy		–		5	–	7
UCF		–		4	–	7
Middle Tennessee		–		3	–	8
Louisiana–Lafayette		–		2	–	9
Rankings from AP Poll

The 1999 Notre Dame Fighting Irish football team was an American football team that represented the University of Notre Dame as an independent during the 1999 NCAA Division I-A football season. In their third year under head coach Bob Davie, the Irish compiled a 5–7 record and outscored opponents by a total of 348 to 331. In games against ranked opponents, they defeated No. 23 Oklahoma, but lost to No. 7 Michigan, No. 20 Purdue, No. 3 Tennessee, and No. 25 Boston College.

The team's statistical leaders included quarterback Jarious Jackson (2,753 passing yards, 42 points scored), Tony Fisher (783 rushing yards, 42 points scored), and wide receiver Bobby Brown (36 receptions for 608 yards).

The team played its home games at Notre Dame Stadium in Notre Dame, Indiana.

== Schedule ==
Date	Time	Opponent	Rank	Site	TV	Result	Attendance	Source
August 28	3:30 p.m.	Kansas	No. 18	Notre Dame Stadium; Notre Dame, IN (Eddie Robinson Classic)	NBC	W 48–13	80,012	
September 4	3:30 p.m.	at No. 7 Michigan	No. 16	Michigan Stadium; Ann Arbor, MI (rivalry)	ABC	L 22–26	111,523	
September 11	3:30 p.m.	at No. 20 Purdue	No. 16	Ross–Ade Stadium; West Lafayette, IN (rivalry)	ABC	L 23–28	69,843	
September 18	2:30 p.m.	Michigan State	No. 24	Notre Dame Stadium; Notre Dame, IN (rivalry)	NBC	L 13–23	80,012	
October 2	2:30 p.m.	No. 23 Oklahoma		Notre Dame Stadium; Notre Dame, IN	NBC	W 34–30	80,012	
October 9	2:30 p.m.	Arizona State		Notre Dame Stadium; Notre Dame, IN	NBC	W 48–17	80,012	
October 16	2:30 p.m.	USC		Notre Dame Stadium; Notre Dame, IN (rivalry)	NBC	W 25–24	80,012	
October 30	2:30 p.m.	Navy		Notre Dame Stadium; Notre Dame, IN (rivalry)	NBC	W 28–24	80,012	
November 6	7:30 p.m.	at No. 4 Tennessee	No. 24	Neyland Stadium; Knoxville, TN	ESPN	L 14–38	107,619	
November 13	3:30 p.m.	at Pittsburgh		Pitt Stadium; Pittsburgh, PA (rivalry)	CBS	L 27–37	60,190	
November 20	1:30 p.m.	No. 25 Boston College		Notre Dame Stadium; Notre Dame, IN (Holy War)	NBC	L 29–31	80,012	
November 27	8:00 p.m.	at Stanford		Stanford Stadium; Stanford, CA (rivalry)	ABC	L 37–40	57,980	
Rankings from AP Poll released prior to the game; All times are in Eastern time

== Rankings ==
Ranking movements Legend: ██ Increase in ranking ██ Decrease in ranking — = Not ranked
	Week																
Poll	Pre	1	2	3	4	5	6	7	8	9	10	11	12	13	14	15	Final
AP	18	16	16	24	—	—	—	—	—	—	24	—	—	—	—	—	—
Coaches Poll	18	18*	21	—	—	—	—	—	—	—	—	—	—	—	—	—	—
BCS	Not released									—	—	—	—	—	—	—	Not released

== Season summary ==
The 1999 season began on a positive note for Davie, who, after signing 21 recruits, was given a contract extension to coach until 2003. Though there were high hopes that the Irish could finally get another national championship, there were also many questions facing the team, top among those would be whether Jackson could lead a young Irish team. With some controversy surrounding a verbal agreement between Notre Dame and Michigan to not schedule a game before their September 4 matchup, the Irish instead opened the season in the Eddie Robinson Classic against Kansas. Though Jackson did not answer all the questions in the game (throwing three interceptions), the Irish still dominated the Jayhawks in the 48–13 win. With the Irish ranked 16th they went next to face the seventh-ranked Wolverines. Watched by a crowd of 111,523 (then an NCAA record), the Wolverines took the lead late in the game on an Anthony Thomas touchdown run. With under two minutes remaining, Jackson led the Irish down the field with three quick passes. However, the time ran out as he completed his fourth pass of the drive. Though the Irish lost, 26–22, they would remain at 16th in the national polls until stumbling against Purdue the next week. With Davie blaming poor communication on the loss, the Irish dropped from the rankings for the first time in two years.

With a 10-game home winning streak, the Irish hoped to get back on track with a win against Michigan State. With the game tied 7–7 starting the fourth quarter, it looked to be headed for another last-minute decision. However, with five minutes left in the game and the score tied again at 13–13, Spartans quarterback Bill Burke threw a quick pass to Gari Scott who ran for an 80-yard touchdown. Though the Irish had a chance and drove to the 50-yard line, Davie elected to punt the ball on fourth down with three minutes left in the game. The Spartans added a field goal to put them up 23–13 and win the game. After a week off, the Irish faced the 23rd-ranked Oklahoma Sooners. Down 30–14 mid-way through the third quarter, Jackson led the Irish on two scoring drives to bring them within two points. With the ball at their own 2-yard line, Jackson led a 98-yard drive that gave the Irish the winning touchdown. The Irish continued at home, blowing out Arizona State, coming from behind by 21 points to defeat USC, and scoring a last minute touchdown to beat Navy, to move back into the rankings.

For the first time since September, the Irish would go on the road. Facing the fourth-ranked Tennessee Volunteers, the Irish knew they were in for a tough test as Tennessee, the reigning winners of the inaugural BCS National Championship, had not lost a non-conference home game since the 1990 Irish team won there. Against the tough Volunteer defense, the Irish were only able to score 14 in the 24 point loss, and once again dropped from the rankings. With a loss to Pittsburgh in the final game at Pitt Stadium, and a last second loss on a failed two-point conversion against Boston College, the Irish lost all chances to go to a bowl game with a 5–6 record. Hoping to avoid their first losing season since 1986, they traveled to Stanford to face the Cardinal. With Jackson splitting time with Arnaz Battle, the Irish come-from-behind bid failed on a last second field goal by Stanford.

Considering the preseason polls, the season was a disappointment. Although Jackson, a fifth-year senior, ended his career with the Irish on a high note. Named the team's Most Valuable Player, he set the single-season records in passing yards, total yards, pass attempts, and completions. He also left with the fourth-most passing yards in Irish history. Jackson was drafted in the seventh round of the 2000 NFL draft, and, although he was the only player from the team drafted, nine others signed free agent contracts with NFL teams. The year ended on a bad note for the Irish program, as the NCAA placed the program on probation for two years after a number of major secondary violations by the university and others involved in athletics. Then-university president Rev. Edward Malloy disbanded all varsity booster clubs, the first time any university took such actions, and put into place other safeguards against violations, pledging his administration would give a greater effort to stop any future violations.

== Game summaries ==
=== Oklahoma ===
Team	1	2	3	4	Total
Oklahoma	7	16	7	0	30
• Notre Dame	7	7	14	6	34

- Date: October 2
- Location: Notre Dame Stadium, South Bend, IN
- Game start: 1:37 p.m. local
- Elapsed time: 3:38
- Game attendance: 80,012
- Game weather: Light Rain, 50 F, N 7
- Referee: Tom Ahlers
- Television network: NBC

Scoring summary
1	13:17	ND	Jarious Jackson 10-yard run (Jim Sanson kick)	ND 7–0
1	13:00	OU	Brandon Daniels 89-yard kickoff return (Tim Duncan kick)	Tied 7–7
2	12:07	OU	Safety, punt fumbled out of end zone	OU 9–7
2	8:59	OU	Jarrail Jackson 4-yard pass from Josh Heupel (Tim Duncan kick)	OU 16–7
2	5:20	ND	Joey Getherall 58-yard pass from Jarious Jackson (Jim Sanson kick)	OU 16–14
2	4:55	OU	Trent Smith 26-yard pass from Josh Heupel (Tim Duncan kick)	OU 23–14
3	10:01	OU	Brandon Daniels 15-yard pass from Josh Heupel (Tim Duncan kick)	OU 30–14
3	7:20	ND	Jabari Holloway 15-yard pass from Jarious Jackson (Jim Sanson kick)	OU 30–21
3	2:37	ND	Tony Driver 1-yard run (Jim Sanson kick)	OU 30–28
4	9:19	ND	Tony Driver 1-yard run (pass failed)	ND 34–30

== Roster ==
1999 Notre Dame Fighting Irish football team roster
Players
Coaches
Offense

Pos.	#	Name	Class
QB	3	Arnaz Battle	So
WR	4	Jamaar Taylor	Fr
QB	7	Jarious Jackson	Sr
QB	8	Eric Chappell	Sr
SE	9	Raki Nelson	Sr
FL	11	Jay Johnson	Sr
RB	12	Tony Fisher	So
WR	12	Mark Rule	Sr
SE	14	David Givens	So
TE	16	John Shingler	Sr
FB	17	Jeremy Juarez	Jr
SE	18	Joey Getherall	Jr
FL	21	Javin Hunter	So
RB	22	Julius Jones	Fr
RB	23	Chris Yura	Fr
RB	25	Tony Driver	Jr
RB	31	Darcey Levy	Jr
RB	32	Terrance Howard	So
RB	33	Courtney Watson	Fr
FB	34	Jascint Vukelich	Jr
RB	35	Tim O'Neill	So
FB	36	Tom Lopienski	So
FB	40	Jason Murray	Jr
FB	45	Joey Goodspeed	Sr
TE	46	Andrew Dempsey	Jr
FB	47	Mike McNair	So
SE	48	Johnathan Hebert	Sr
OL	52	Jeff Faine	Fr
G	55	Jim Jones	Sr
G	58	Brendan O'Connor	Sr
FB	61	Mike Zelenka	Jr
OT	62	Casey Robin	Jr
OL	63	Brennan Curtin	Fr
C	64	John Merandi	Sr
OL	65	Sean Milligan	Fr
C	66	JW Jordan	Jr
OL	67	Ryan Gillis	Fr
OT	68	Matt Brennan	Sr
G	69	Mike Gandy	Sr
OL	71	Neal Ambron	Fr
OT	72	Ryan Scarola	So
G	73	Jeff Roehl	So
G	75	Kurt Vollers	Jr
OT	76	John Teasdale	Jr
OT	78	Jordan Black	So
TE	80	Gary Godsey	Fr
WR	83	Patrick Reynolds	So
TE	84	Gerald Morgan	So
TE	86	Dan O'Leary	Sr
TE	87	Jabari Holloway	Jr
FL	88	Bobby Brown	Sr
TE	89	John Owens	So
TE	92	Joe Recendez	Sr
C	93	B.J. Scott	Sr

Defense

Pos.	#	Name	Class
FS	1	Deke Cooper	Sr
MLB	2	Carlos Pierre-Antoine	So
SS	5	A'Jani Sanders	Sr
OLB	8	Anthony Brannan	Sr
DB	9	Dwayne Francis	So
CB	10	Deveron Harper	Sr
CB	15	Clifford Jefferson	So
DB	16	Glenn Earl	Fr
DB	20	Gerome Sapp	Fr
DB	24	Albert Poree	Fr
SS	26	Lee Lafayette	Sr
DB	27	Jason Beckstrom	Fr
CB	28	Donald Dykes	So
FS	28	Mike Grady	Sr
DB	29	Brian Oleniczak	Jr
CB	29	Justin Smith	Jr
OLB	30	Rocky Boiman	So
MLB	34	Ronnie Nicks	Sr
FS	37	Ron Israel	Jr
CB	38	Brock Williams	Jr
MLB	39	Anthony Denman	Jr
SS	39	Chris Leck	Sr
MLB	40	Brendan Farrell	Sr
OLB	41	Joe Ferrer	Sr
CB	42	Shane Walton	So
MLB	43	Hugh Holmes	Jr
DE	44	Grant Irons	Jr
CB	45	Matt Sarb	So
DL	50	Cedric Hilliard	Fr
MLB	51	Tyreo Harrison	So
OLB	52	Mark Mitchell	Jr
DE	53	Lamont Bryant	Sr
LB	56	Pat Ryan	Fr
LB	57	Luigi Rao	Jr
LB	57	Justin Thomas	Fr
LB	59	Brian Dierckman	Jr
DL	60	Darrell Campbell	Fr
MLB	63	Mike Tribe	Sr
DL	70	Jim Molinaro	Fr
DT	77	Brad Williams	Sr
DT	85	Antwon Jones	Sr
DT	90	Lance Legree	Sr
DE	91	Noah VanHook-Drucker	Sr
DT	94	Andy Wisne	Jr
DE	95	Ryan Roberts	So
DT	96	Sean Mahan	So
DT	98	Eric Glass	Sr
DE	98	Anthony Weaver	So
DE	99	Jason Ching	Sr

Special teams

Pos.	#	Name	Class
K	13	Nick Setta	Fr
P	14	James Caputo	Sr
P	17	Joey Hildbold	Fr
K	19	Jim Sanson	Sr
K	35	David Miller	So
LS	56	John Crowther	So
K	92	Adam Tibble	So

Head coach

- Bob Davie

Coordinators/assistant coaches

- Kirk Doll – Assistant Head Coach, Inside Linebackers
- Greg Mattison – Defensive Line
- Urban Meyer – Quarterback Coach
- Desmond Robinson – Running Backs
- Dave Borbely – Offensive Line
- Bob Chmiel – Coordinator of Football Operations
- Dan Mullen – Graduate Assistant
- Taver Johnson – Graduate Assistant
- Kevin Rogers – offensive coordinator and receivers
- Lou West – secondary
- Jerry Rosburg – outside linebackers, special teams
- Steve Addazio – tight ends and special teams

Legend

- (C) Team captain
- (S) Suspended
- (I) Ineligible
- Injured
- Redshirt

Roster
