= Eddie Robinson Classic =

The Eddie Robinson Classic was a college football "kickoff" game played in late August from 1997 through 2002 at various sites. The game was named after legendary Grambling coach Eddie Robinson. Until 2002, the NCAA only allowed for teams to play a 12-game regular season schedule if the first game were a licensed Classic such as the Eddie Robinson Classic, the Pigskin Classic, or the Kickoff Classic. In 2002 the NCAA ended the allowance of an extra 12th game, thus effectively ending the Classics. Kickoff games would later see a revival in 2008, when the Chick-fil-A Kickoff Game was organized as a neutral-site game held in Atlanta, Georgia, followed by the Cowboys Classic in Arlington, Texas in 2009.

== Game results ==
Season	Date	Winning team		Losing team		Site
1997	August 28	9 Ohio State	24	Wyoming	10	Ohio Stadium • Columbus, OH
1998	August 29	4 Nebraska	56	Louisiana Tech	27	Memorial Stadium • Lincoln, NE
1999	August 28	18 Notre Dame	48	Kansas	13	Notre Dame Stadium • South Bend, IN
2000	August 26	8 Kansas State	27	Iowa	7	Arrowhead Stadium • Kansas City, MO
2001	August 25	22 Wisconsin	26	Virginia	17	Camp Randall Stadium • Madison, WI
2002	August 24	3 Florida State	38	Iowa State	31	Arrowhead Stadium • Kansas City, MO

Rankings from AP Poll prior to game.
