= 1999 Wofford Terriers football team =

American college football season

1999 Wofford Terriers football
- Conference: Southern Conference
- Record: 6–5 (5–3 SoCon)
- Head coach: Mike Ayers (12th season)
- Home stadium: Gibbs Stadium

1999 Southern Conference football standings
	Conf.			Overall
Team	W		L	W		L
No. 1 Georgia Southern +^	7	–	1	13	–	2
No. 9 Appalachian State +^	7	–	1	9	–	3
No. 12 Furman +^	7	–	1	9	–	3
Wofford	5	–	3	6	–	5
East Tennessee State	4	–	4	6	–	5
Chattanooga	3	–	5	5	–	6
Western Carolina	2	–	6	3	–	8
The Citadel	1	–	7	2	–	9
VMI	0	–	8	1	–	10
+ – Conference co-champions; ^ – NCAA Division I-AA playoff participant; Rankings from The Sports Network poll

The 1999 Wofford Terriers football team was an American football team that represented Wofford College as a member of the Southern Conference (SoCon) during the 1999 NCAA Division I-AA football season. Led by 12th-year head coach Mike Ayers, the Terriers compiled an overall record of 6–5, with a mark of 5–3 in conference play, and finished fourth in the SoCon.

== Schedule ==
Date	Time	Opponent	Site	Result	Attendance	Source
September 11	7:00 p.m.	No. 1 Georgia Southern	Gibbs Stadium; Spartanburg, SC	L 15–55	8,048	
September 18	5:00 p.m.	at Middle Tennessee*	Johnny "Red" Floyd Stadium; Murfreesboro, TN	L 42–52	15,103	
September 25	1:30 p.m.	Charleston Southern*	Gibbs Stadium; Spartanburg, SC	W 25–13	5,248	
October 2	7:00 p.m.	at Chattanooga	Finley Stadium; Chattanooga, TN	W 41–34	7,029	
October 9	1:30 p.m.	VMI	Gibbs Stadium; Spartanburg, SC	W 55–10	7,341	
October 16	6:00 p.m.	at Western Carolina	E. J. Whitmire Stadium; Cullowhee, NC	W 35–21	9,214	
October 23	1:30 p.m.	No. 6 Appalachian State	Gibbs Stadium; Spartanburg, SC	L 20–21	8,249	
October 30	12:30 p.m.	at The Citadel	Johnson Hagood Stadium; Charleston, SC (rivalry)	W 47–16	11,429	
November 6	1:30 p.m.	East Tennessee State	Gibbs Stadium; Spartanburg, SC	W 38–14	6,816	
November 13	2:00 p.m.	at No. 9 Furman	Paladin Stadium; Greenville, SC (rivalry)	L 30–3	14,177	
November 20	5:00 p.m.	at Louisiana–Lafayette*	Cajun Field; Lafayette, LA	L 34–37 ^{OT}		
*Non-conference game; Rankings from The Sports Network Poll released prior to the game; All times are in Eastern time
