= 1999 Middle Tennessee Blue Raiders football team =

American college football season

1999 Middle Tennessee Blue Raiders football
- Conference: Independent
- Record: 3–8
- Head coach: Andy McCollum (1st season)
- Offensive coordinator: Larry Fedora (1st season)
- Defensive coordinator: Miles Aldridge (1st season)
- Home stadium: Johnny "Red" Floyd Stadium

1999 NCAA Division I-A independents football records
| | Conf. | | | Overall |
| Team | W | | L | W | | L |
|---|---|---|---|---|---|---|
| Louisiana Tech | | – | | 8 | – | 3 |
| Louisiana–Monroe | | – | | 5 | – | 6 |
| Notre Dame | | – | | 5 | – | 7 |
| Navy | | – | | 5 | – | 7 |
| UCF | | – | | 4 | – | 7 |
| Middle Tennessee | | – | | 3 | – | 8 |
| Louisiana–Lafayette | | – | | 2 | – | 9 |
Rankings from AP Poll

The 1999 Middle Tennessee Blue Raiders football team represented Middle Tennessee State University in the 1999 NCAA Division I-A football season.

== Schedule ==
| Date | Opponent | Site | Result | Attendance | Source |
|---|---|---|---|---|---|
| September 4 | at Mississippi State | Scott Field; Starkville, MS | L 7–40 | 35,230 | |
| September 11 | at Arizona | Arizona Stadium; Tucson, AZ | L 19–34 | 48,573 | |
| September 18 | Wofford | Johnny "Red" Floyd Stadium; Murfreesboro, TN | W 52–42 | 15,103 | |
| September 25 | at Louisiana–Lafayette | Cajun Field; Lafayette, LA | L 31–45 | 14,621 | |
| October 2 | No. 4 Troy State | Johnny "Red" Floyd Stadium; Murfreesboro, TN | L 31–48 | 17,137 | |
| October 9 | at Arkansas | Razorback Stadium; Fayetteville, AR | L 6–58 | 51,896 | |
| October 16 | at Louisiana Tech | Joe Aillet Stadium; Ruston, LA | L 18–42 | 12,000 | |
| October 30 | at Louisiana–Monroe | Malone Stadium; Monroe, LA | L 0–10 | 12,326 | |
| November 6 | Tennessee–Martin | Johnny "Red" Floyd Stadium; Murfreesboro, TN | W 70–14 | 10,137 | |
| November 13 | UCF | Johnny "Red" Floyd Stadium; Murfreesboro, TN | L 14–39 | 10,751 | |
| November 20 | East Tennessee State | Johnny "Red" Floyd Stadium; Murfreesboro, TN | W 24–7 | 9,231 | |
Rankings from The Sports Network Poll released prior to the game
