= 1999 Chattanooga Mocs football team =

American college football season

1999 Chattanooga Mocs football
- Conference: Southern Conference
- Record: 5–6 (3–5 SoCon)
- Head coach: Buddy Green (6th season)
- Offensive coordinator: Donnie Kirkpatrick (2nd season)
- Captains: Damon Floyd; Stefpon Hawkins; Jimmy Lindsey; Ioelu Tafiti
- Home stadium: Finley Stadium

1999 Southern Conference football standings
| | Conf. | | | Overall |
| Team | W | | L | W | | L |
|---|---|---|---|---|---|---|
| No. 1 Georgia Southern $^ | 7 | – | 1 | 13 | – | 2 |
| No. 9 Appalachian State ^ | 7 | – | 1 | 9 | – | 3 |
| No. 12 Furman ^ | 7 | – | 1 | 9 | – | 3 |
| Wofford | 5 | – | 3 | 6 | – | 5 |
| East Tennessee State | 4 | – | 4 | 6 | – | 5 |
| Chattanooga | 3 | – | 5 | 5 | – | 6 |
| Western Carolina | 2 | – | 6 | 3 | – | 8 |
| The Citadel | 1 | – | 7 | 2 | – | 9 |
| VMI | 0 | – | 8 | 1 | – | 10 |
$ – Conference champion; ^ – NCAA Division I-AA playoff participant; Rankings from The Sports Network I-AA Poll

The 1999 Chattanooga Mocs football team represented the University of Tennessee at Chattanooga as a member of the Southern Conference (SoCon) in the 1999 NCAA Division I-AA football season. The Mocs were led by sixth-year head coach Buddy Green and played their home games at Finley Stadium. They finished the season 5–6 overall and 3–5 in play to place sixth .

== Schedule ==
| Date | Time | Opponent | Site | Result | Attendance | Source |
|---|---|---|---|---|---|---|
| September 2 | 7:00 pm | at Samford* | Seibert Stadium; Homewood, AL | W 29–27 | 6,340 | |
| September 11 | 7:00 pm | at Louisville* | Papa John's Cardinal Stadium; Louisville, KY | L 30–58 | 38,147 | |
| September 18 | 3:30 pm | Savannah State* | Finley Stadium; Chattanooga, TN | W 49–0 | 9,499 | |
| September 25 | 1:00 pm | at No. 1 Georgia Southern | Paulson Stadium; Statesboro, GA | L 10–49 | 14,746 | |
| October 2 | 7:00 pm | Wofford | Finley Stadium; Chattanooga, TN | L 34–41 | 7,029 | |
| October 16 | 1:00 pm | at VMI | Alumni Memorial Field; Lexington, VA | W 27–0 | 5,327 | |
| October 23 | 7:00 pm | Western Carolina | Finley Stadium; Chattanooga, TN | W 56–28 | 5,719 | |
| October 30 | 2:00 pm | at No. 6 Appalachian State | Kidd Brewer Stadium; Boone, NC | L 14–62 | 13,711 | |
| November 6 | 7:00 pm | The Citadel^{†} | Finley Stadium; Chattanooga, TN | W 30–27 ^{OT} | 6,449 | |
| November 13 | 2:00 pm | at East Tennessee State | Memorial Center; Johnson City, TN | L 14–28 | 5,019 | |
| November 20 | 12:00 pm | No. 9 Furman | Finley Stadium; Chattanooga, TN | L 35–40 | 6,676 | |
*Non-conference game; ^{†}Homecoming; Rankings from The Sports Network Poll released prior to the game; All times are in Eastern time
