= 1999 Furman Paladins football team =

American college football season

1999 Furman Paladins football

SoCon co-champion

NCAA Division I-AA First Round, L 23–30 ^{OT} vs. UMass
- Conference: Southern Conference
- Record: 9–3 (7–1 SoCon)
- Head coach: Bobby Johnson (6th season)
- Captains: Walter Booth; Ben Hall; John Keith; Stuart Rentz
- Home stadium: Paladin Stadium

1999 Southern Conference football standings
	Conf.			Overall
Team	W		L	W		L
No. 1 Georgia Southern +^	7	–	1	13	–	2
No. 9 Appalachian State +^	7	–	1	9	–	3
No. 12 Furman +^	7	–	1	9	–	3
Wofford	5	–	3	6	–	5
East Tennessee State	4	–	4	6	–	5
Chattanooga	3	–	5	5	–	6
Western Carolina	2	–	6	3	–	8
The Citadel	1	–	7	2	–	9
VMI	0	–	8	1	–	10
+ – Conference co-champions; ^ – NCAA Division I-AA playoff participant; Rankings from The Sports Network poll

The 1999 Furman Paladins football team was an American football team that represented Furman University as a member of the Southern Conference (SoCon) during the 1999 NCAA Division I-AA football season. In their sixth year under head coach Bobby Johnson, the Paladins compiled an overall record of 9–3 with a conference mark of 7–1, sharing the SoCon title with Appalachian State and Georgia Southern. Furman advanced to the NCAA Division I-AA Football Championship playoffs, where they were upset by UMass in the first round.

== Schedule ==
Date	Opponent	Rank	Site	Result	Attendance	Source
September 4	Elon*		Paladin Stadium; Greenville, SC	L 22–24	7,152	
September 18	at William & Mary*		Zable Stadium; Williamsburg, VA	W 52–6	6,390	
September 25	VMI		Paladin Stadium; Greenville, SC	W 58–0	11,212	
October 2	at Western Carolina		Bob Waters Field at E. J. Whitmire Stadium; Cullowhee, NC	W 27–19	11,818	
October 9	No. 3 Appalachian State		Paladin Stadium; Greenville, SC	W 35–21	13,052	
October 16	at The Citadel	No. 18	Johnson Hagood Stadium; Charleston, SC (rivalry)	W 31–17	14,629	
October 23	No. 13 East Tennessee State	No. 14	Paladin Stadium; Greenville, SC	W 48–21	12,572	
October 30	at North Carolina*	No. 12	Kenan Memorial Stadium; Chapel Hill, NC	W 28–3	33,000	
November 6	at No. 4 Georgia Southern	No. 7	Paulson Stadium; Statesboro, GA	L 38–41	18,636	
November 13	Wofford	No. 9	Paladin Stadium; Greenville, SC (rivalry)	W 30–3	14,177	
November 20	at Chattanooga	No. 9	Finley Stadium; Chattanooga, TN	W 40–35	6,676	
November 27	No. 10 UMass*	No. 7	Paladin Stadium; Greenville, SC (NCAA Division I-AA First Round)	L 23–30 ^{OT}	7,215	
*Non-conference game; Rankings from The Sports Network Poll released prior to the game
