= 1999 Navy Midshipmen football team =

American college football season

1999 Navy Midshipmen football
- Conference: Independent
- Record: 5–7
- Head coach: Charlie Weatherbie (5th season)
- Offensive coordinator: Mike Vaught (1st season)
- Offensive scheme: Triple option
- Defensive coordinator: Tim DeRuyter (1st season)
- Base defense: 3–4
- MVP: Chris Lepore
- Home stadium: Navy–Marine Corps Memorial Stadium

1999 NCAA Division I-A independents football records
	Conf.			Overall
Team	W		L	W		L
Louisiana Tech		–		8	–	3
Louisiana–Monroe		–		5	–	6
Notre Dame		–		5	–	7
Navy		–		5	–	7
UCF		–		4	–	7
Middle Tennessee		–		3	–	8
Louisiana–Lafayette		–		2	–	9
Rankings from AP Poll

The 1999 Navy Midshipmen football team represented the United States Naval Academy (USNA) as an independent during the 1999 NCAA Division I-A football season. The team was led by fifth-year head coach Charlie Weatherbie.

== Schedule ==
Date	Time	Opponent	Site	TV	Result	Attendance
September 4	12:00 p.m.	Georgia Tech	Navy–Marine Corps Memorial Stadium; Annapolis, MD	FSN	L 14–49	30,311
September 11		at Kent State	Dix Stadium; Kent, OH		W 48–28	12,872
September 18	12:00 p.m.	Boston College	Navy–Marine Corps Memorial Stadium; Annapolis, MD		L 10–14	34,052
September 25	8:00 p.m.	at Rice	Rice Stadium; Houston, TX		L 17–20	44,217
October 2	12:00 p.m.	at West Virginia	Mountaineer Field; Morgantown, WV		W 31–28	52,875
October 9		vs. Air Force	FedExField; Landover, MD (Commander-in-Chief's Trophy)		L 14–19	46,450
October 23		Akron^{†}	Navy–Marine Corps Memorial Stadium; Annapolis, MD		L 29–35	30,780
October 30	2:30 p.m.	at Notre Dame	Notre Dame Stadium; South Bend, IN (rivalry)	NBC	L 24–28	80,012
November 6	2:00 p.m.	at Rutgers	Rutgers Stadium; Piscataway, NJ		W 34–7	20,339
November 13	12:00 p.m.	Tulane	Navy–Marine Corps Memorial Stadium; Annapolis, MD		W 45–21	32,840
November 20		at Hawaii	Aloha Stadium; Honolulu, HI		L 41–48	41,895
December 4		vs. Army	Veterans Stadium; Philadelphia, PA (Army–Navy Game)	CBS	W 19–9	70,049
^{†}Homecoming; All times are in Eastern time

== Game summaries ==
=== vs Army ===
Army Black Knights (3–7) vs. Navy Midshipmen (4–7)

Quarter	1	2	3	4	Total
Navy	7	6	3	3	19
Army	0	3	0	6	9

at Veterans Stadium, Philadelphia, Pennsylvania

- Date: December 4, 1999
- Game attendance: 70,049
- TV announcers (CBS): Sean McDonough, Todd Blackledge, Michele Tafoya, and Ed Cunningham
- Box Score

Game information

First quarter

- NAVY – Brian Madden 2-yard run (Tim Shubzda kick). Navy 7–0.

Second quarter

- NAVY – Tim Shubzda 35-yard field goal. Navy 10–0.
- ARMY – Matt Parker 44-yard field goal. Navy 10–3.
- NAVY – Tim Shubzda 34-yard field goal. Navy 13–3.

Third quarter

- NAVY – Tim Shubzda 37-yard field goal. Navy 16–3.

Fourth quarter

- NAVY – Tim Shubzda 38-yard field goal. Navy 19–3.
- ARMY – Shaun Castillo 2-yard pass from Joe Gerena (two-point conversion failed). Navy 19–9.

Top passers

- NAVY – Brian Madden – 3/4, 27 yards
- ARMY – Joe Gerena – 7/19, 95 yards, TD, INT

Top rushers

- NAVY – Brian Madden – 41 rushes, 177 yards, TD
- ARMY – Michael Wallace – 25 rushes, 76 yards

Top receivers

- NAVY – Matt O'Donnell – 2 receptions, 19 yards
- ARMY – Grady Jett – 2 receptions, 26 yards

100th meeting (75th in Philadelphia)

- Navy wore early 1960s uniforms
- Roger Staubach, Joe Bellino, and Pete Dawkins appeared for the ceremonial coin toss
- Navy dedicated the win to two fallen teammates, Chris Wilson (died Tuesday), and Jason McCray (who died two years ago). The Midshipmen wore a patch in memory of Wilson, who died during a physical test at the academy.

External videos
- Full game

== Roster ==
1999 Navy Midshipmen football team roster
Players
Coaches
Offense

Pos.	#	Name	Class
C	62	Terrence Anderson	Sr
G	69	Eric Bowman	So
RB		Dre Brittingham
QB	14	Brian Broadwater	Jr
QB	17	Robert Burns	So
RB	22	Terence Coleman	So
RB		Michael Darnell
G	71	Jarrett Davies	Sr
RB		Soso Dede
RB		John Fay
RB		Donnie Fricks
RB		Pat Haines
OT	60	Kostas Hatzidakis	Sr
RB	5	Steve Holley	Sr
OT	72	Doug Howard	Sr
G	64	John Jeffery	So
WR	23	Scott Jones	Sr
RB		Rasheem Lambert
QB		Brian Madden
QB	10	Ed Malinowski	So
TE	80	Rion Martin	So
G	67	Kevin McCormick	So
WR	83	Matt O'Donnell	Sr
OT	77	Nate Olish	So
OT	78	Pete Peemoeller	Jr
WR	82	Brandon Rampani	So
WR		Dave Rautenbach
RB		Eric Reed
RB		Gene Reese
C	68	Pat Singleton	Sr
OT	79	Hoot Stahl	Jr
G	70	Scott Swantner	Jr
RB		Marlon Terrell
RB	4	John Vereen	Sr
WR	11	Travis Williams	Sr
OT	73	Ron Winchester	Jr
G	63	Philip Yeh	Jr

Defense

Pos.	#	Name	Class
DB		Davede Alexander
LB	44	David Bader	Jr
LB	51	David Burden	Jr
DL	93	Scott Burton	Sr
LB		John Chavous
DB		DeJuan Cromer
LB	47	Matt Daigneault	Sr
DB		Jamie Doffermyre
LB	49	Earl Fountain	Sr
DE	92	Ivan Garvin	Sr
LB	41	Roger Grant	Sr
DE	99	Brian Gray	Sr
LB		Geno Hamilton
LB		Ryan Hamilton
LB	55	Daryl Hill	Jr
LB		Rashad Jones
LB	59	Justin Jordan	Jr
DB		Chris Lepore
LB	53	David Kunda	So
NG	98	Gino Marchetti	Sr
LB	52	Shaka Martin	So
LB	48	Mike McGee	Jr
LB	54	Jamie Mcllvain	Sr
DE	91	Alex Murray	Sr
DE	95	Bwerani Nettles	So
S	46	Isaac Roland	Jr
NG	96	David Ryno	Sr
DE	50	Bill Shipley	So
DE	97	Dan Venuto	So
DE	90	Michael Wagoner	So
DB		Bas Williams
DE	94	Brad Wimsatt	Jr
DL		Andy Zetts

Special teams

Pos.	#	Name	Class
P		Tray Callisch
K		Tim Shubzda
P	81	Brian Williams	Jr

Head coach

- Charlie Weatherbie

Coordinators/assistant coaches

Legend

- (C) Team captain
- (S) Suspended
- (I) Ineligible
- Injured
- Redshirt

Roster
Last update: 2000-01-18
