= 1999 Western Carolina Catamounts football team =

American college football season

1999 Western Carolina Catamounts football
- Conference: Southern Conference
- Record: 3–8 (2–6 SoCon)
- Head coach: Bill Bleil (3rd season)
- Home stadium: E. J. Whitmire Stadium

1999 Southern Conference football standings
	Conf.			Overall
Team	W		L	W		L
No. 1 Georgia Southern $^	7	–	1	13	–	2
No. 9 Appalachian State ^	7	–	1	9	–	3
No. 12 Furman ^	7	–	1	9	–	3
Wofford	5	–	3	6	–	5
East Tennessee State	4	–	4	6	–	5
Chattanooga	3	–	5	5	–	6
Western Carolina	2	–	6	3	–	8
The Citadel	1	–	7	2	–	9
VMI	0	–	8	1	–	10
$ – Conference champion; ^ – NCAA Division I-AA playoff participant; Rankings from The Sports Network I-AA Poll

The 1999 Western Carolina Catamounts team was an American football team that represented Western Carolina University as a member of the Southern Conference (SoCon) during the 1999 NCAA Division I-AA football season. In their third year under head coach Bill Bleil, the team compiled an overall record of 3–8, with a mark of 2–6 in conference play, and finished seventh in the SoCon.

== Schedule ==
Date	Time	Opponent	Site	Result	Attendance	Source
September 2		Mars Hill*	E. J. Whitmire Stadium; Cullowhee, NC	W 59–0	10,067	
September 11		at Maryland*	Byrd Stadium; College Park, MD	L 10–51	36,376	
September 25		at No. 20 East Tennessee State	Memorial Center; Johnson City, TN	L 10–38	5,448	
October 2		Furman	E. J. Whitmire Stadium; Cullowhee, NC	L 19–27	11,818	
October 9		at No. 1 Georgia Southern	Paulson Stadium; Statesboro, GA	L 7–70	16,406	
October 16	6:00 p.m.	Wofford	E. J. Whitmire Stadium; Cullowhee, NC	L 21–35	9,214	
October 23	7:00 p.m.	at Chattanooga	Finley Stadium; Chattanooga, TN	L 28–56	5,719	
October 30	2:00 p.m.	VMI	E. J. Whitmire Stadium; Cullowhee, NC	W 40–2	8,978	
November 6		Samford*	E. J. Whitmire Stadium; Cullowhee, NC	L 32–35 ^{OT}		
November 13		at No. 5 Appalachian State	Kidd Brewer Stadium; Boone, NC (rivalry)	L 10–34	18,971	
November 20		The Citadel	E. J. Whitmire Stadium; Cullowhee, NC	W 24–17	5,622	
*Non-conference game; Rankings from The Sports Network Poll released prior to the game; All times are in Eastern time
