= 1999 Louisiana–Monroe Indians football team =

American college football season

1999 Louisiana–Monroe Indians football
- Conference: Independent
- Record: 5–6
- Head coach: Bobby Keasler (1st season)
- Offensive coordinator: Roger Carr (1st season)
- Defensive coordinator: Mike Collins (1st season)
- Home stadium: Malone Stadium

1999 NCAA Division I-A independents football records
	Conf.			Overall
Team	W		L	W		L
Louisiana Tech		–		8	–	3
Louisiana–Monroe		–		5	–	6
Notre Dame		–		5	–	7
Navy		–		5	–	7
UCF		–		4	–	7
Middle Tennessee		–		3	–	8
Louisiana–Lafayette		–		2	–	9
Rankings from AP Poll

The 1999 Louisiana–Monroe Indians football team represented the University of Louisiana at Monroe as an independent during the 1999 NCAA Division I-A football season. Led by first-year head coach Bobby Keasler, the Indians compiled a record of 5–6. Louisiana–Monroe's offense scored 186 points while the defense allowed 322 points. The team played home games at Malone Stadium in Monroe, Louisiana.

== Schedule ==
Date	Time	Opponent	Site	Result	Attendance	Source
September 4	7:00 pm	Nicholls State	Malone Stadium; Monroe, LA	W 27–10	12,722	
September 11	7:00 pm	at Minnesota	Hubert H. Humphrey Metrodome; Minneapolis, MN	L 0–35	38,137	
September 18	6:00 pm	at No. 15 Arkansas	War Memorial Stadium; Little Rock, AR	L 6–44	55,382	
September 25	6:00 pm	Northwestern State	Malone Stadium; Monroe, LA (rivalry)	W 38–7	14,516	
October 2	6:00 pm	at UAB	Legion Field; Birmingham, AL	L 0–47	18,762	
October 9	2:00 pm	at Utah	Rice–Eccles Stadium; Salt Lake City, UT	L 0–42	34,913	
October 16	7:00 pm	Wyoming	Malone Stadium; Monroe, LA	L 20–38	14,640	
October 23	4:00 pm	at Louisiana–Lafayette	Cajun Field; Lafayette, LA (rivalry)	W 31–7	17,034	
October 30	1:00 pm	Middle Tennessee	Malone Stadium; Monroe, LA	W 10–0	12,326	
November 6	6:00 pm	at Louisiana Tech	Joe Aillet Stadium; Ruston, LA (rivalry)	L 17–58	27,360	
November 13	2:00 pm	at Tulsa	Skelly Stadium; Tulsa, OK	W 37–34	15,037	
Rankings from AP Poll released prior to the game; All times are in Central time
