= 1999 Louisiana Tech Bulldogs football team =

American college football season

1999 Louisiana Tech Bulldogs football
- Conference: Independent
- Record: 8–3
- Head coach: Jack Bicknell Jr. (1st season)
- Offensive coordinator: Clint Conque (1st season)
- Defensive coordinator: Tom Masella (1st season)
- Captain: None
- Home stadium: Joe Aillet Stadium

1999 NCAA Division I-A independents football records
	Conf.			Overall
Team	W		L	W		L
Louisiana Tech		–		8	–	3
Louisiana–Monroe		–		5	–	6
Notre Dame		–		5	–	7
Navy		–		5	–	7
UCF		–		4	–	7
Middle Tennessee		–		3	–	8
Louisiana–Lafayette		–		2	–	9
Rankings from AP Poll

The 1999 Louisiana Tech Bulldogs football team was an American football team that represented Louisiana Tech University as an independent during the 1999 NCAA Division I-A football season. In their first year under head coach Jack Bicknell Jr., the team compiled an 8–3 record.

== Schedule ==
Date	Opponent	Rank	Site	Result	Attendance	Source
August 28	at No. 1 Florida State		Doak Campbell Stadium; Tallahassee, FL	L 7–41	72,702	
September 4	No. 6 Texas A&M		Independence Stadium; Shreveport, LA	L 17–37	40,328	
September 11	Sam Houston State		Joe Aillet Stadium; Ruston, LA	W 55–17	16,621	
September 18	at No. 18 Alabama		Legion Field; Birmingham, AL	W 29–28	80,312	
October 2	at Louisiana–Lafayette		Cajun Field; Lafayette, LA (rivalry)	W 41–31	19,724	
October 16	Middle Tennessee State		Joe Aillet Stadium; Ruston, LA	W 42–18	17,324	
October 23	at UCF		Florida Citrus Bowl; Orlando, FL	W 46–35	16,535	
October 30	at Toledo		Glass Bowl; Toledo, OH	W 34–17	17,904	
November 6	Louisiana–Monroe		Joe Aillet Stadium; Ruston, LA (rivalry)	W 58–17	27,360	
November 13	at UAB		Legion Field; Birmingham, AL	W 41–20	18,672	
November 26	at USC	No. 25	Los Angeles Memorial Coliseum; Los Angeles, CA	L 19–45	45,070	
Rankings from AP Poll released prior to the game
