= 1999 UCF Golden Knights football team =

American college football season

1999 UCF Golden Knights football
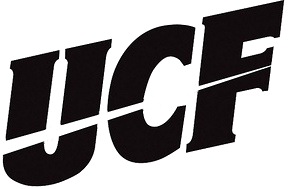
- Conference: Independent
- Record: 4–7
- Head coach: Mike Kruczek (2nd season)
- Offensive coordinator: Paul Lounsberry (2nd season)
- Defensive coordinator: Gene Chizik (2nd season)
- Home stadium: Florida Citrus Bowl

1999 NCAA Division I-A independents football records
	Conf.			Overall
Team	W		L	W		L
Louisiana Tech		–		8	–	3
Louisiana–Monroe		–		5	–	6
Notre Dame		–		5	–	7
Navy		–		5	–	7
UCF		–		4	–	7
Middle Tennessee		–		3	–	8
Louisiana–Lafayette		–		2	–	9
Rankings from AP Poll

The 1999 UCF Golden Knights football season was Mike Kruczek's second year as the head coach of the Golden Knights. Looking to build on the success of a nine-win season the year before, the Knights visited five high-profile opponents. Kruczek led UCF to an overall record of 4–7. With the departure of Daunte Culpepper to the NFL draft, the quarterback duties were taken over by college journeyman Vic Penn. On two occasions, the Golden Knights nearly upset a major SEC opponent on the road.

== Season summary ==
The Golden Knights opened the season at the Citrus Bowl, hosting their largest-profile opponent thus far since elevating to Division I-A. Purdue, led by quarterback Drew Brees, soundly defeated UCF 47–13. UCF got out to an early 6–0 lead, but the Boilermakers scored 47 unanswered points, as Brees threw for 273 yards and four touchdowns. As the game got out of hand, two players were later ejected, and twice fans were arrested for running out on the field. The loss snapped UCF's school record of 11 consecutive home game wins, dating back to November 1996.

After being routed by #4 Florida, and #10 Georgia Tech, the Golden Knights almost earned their first victory over an SEC team. UCF was defeated 24–23 by #11 Georgia in a game known as the "Burglary Between the Hedges." (see below). At the 20 yard line with 15 seconds left, quarterback Vic Penn lofted a pass to Kenny Clark in the endzone, but Clark was tackled out of bounds by Bulldogs defender Jeff Harris in what appeared to be blatant pass interference. The SEC officials, however, inexcusably called offensive pass interference on UCF. The Golden Knights were backed up 15 yards, and out of field goal range, and were robbed of a chance for victory.

After starting the season 0–4, the Golden Knights earned two victories against Division I-AA opponents (Eastern Illinois and Nicholls State). They finally got their first win of the season against a Division I-A team with a 31–6 win over Eastern Michigan on October 30.

On November 6, UCF was poised for another possible upset. After a near-miss against Auburn a year earlier, UCF once again took the Tigers down to the wire. Trailing 10–7 with three minutes left, the Tigers blasted for three touchdowns in the span of 97 seconds, dropping UCF by a final score of 28–10.

During the decade of the 1990s, UCF would compile an overall record of 67–46–0 (.593) during the decade.

== Schedule ==
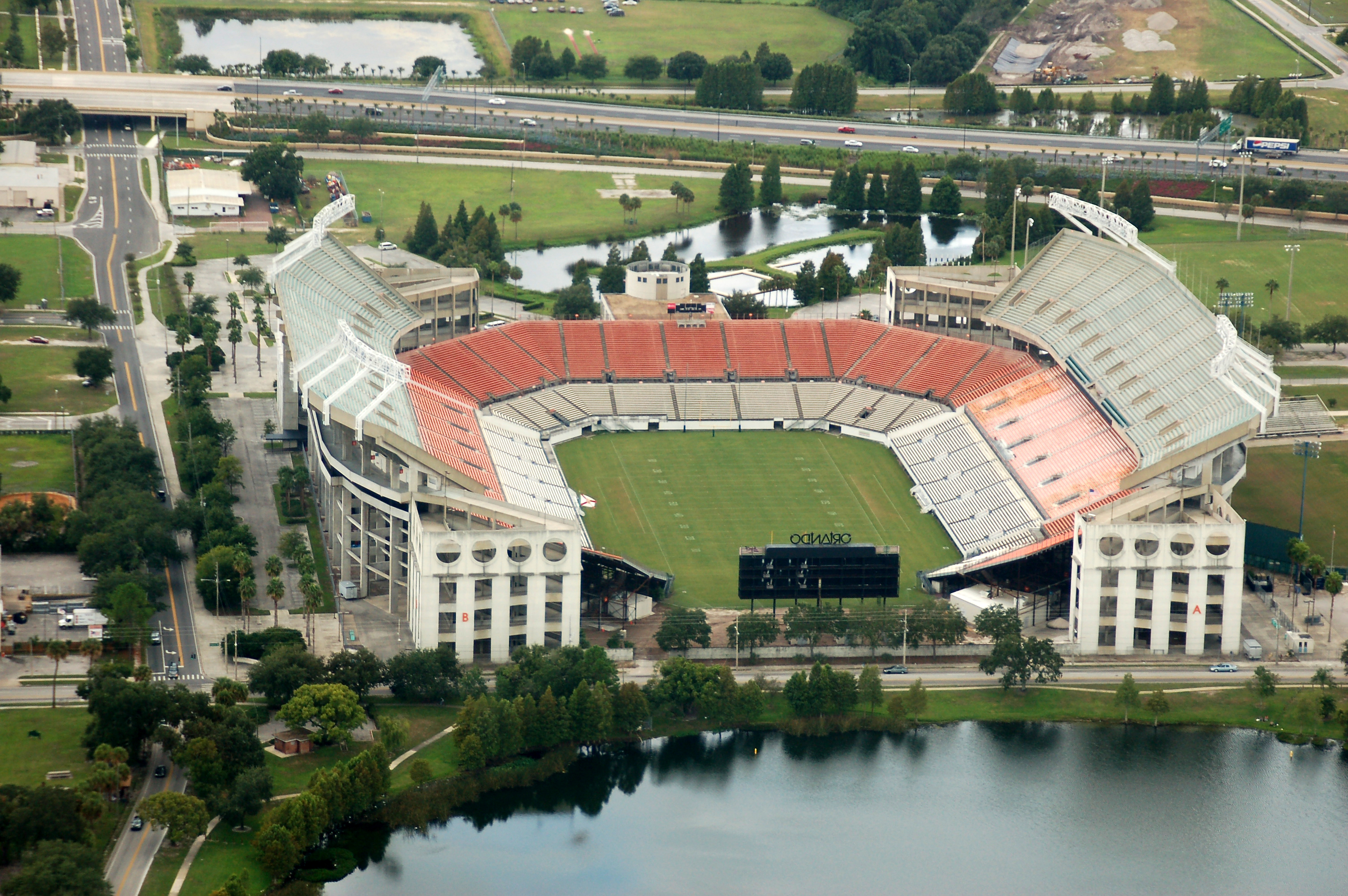
The Florida Citrus Bowl, the Knights' home field

Date	Time	Opponent	Site	TV	Result	Attendance	Source
September 4	6:00 pm	No. 22 Purdue	Florida Citrus Bowl; Orlando, FL	ESPN Plus	L 13–47	40,112	
September 11	6:00 pm	at No. 4 Florida	Ben Hill Griffin Stadium; Gainesville, FL	PPV	L 27–58	85,346	
September 18	7:00 pm	at No. 12 Georgia Tech	Bobby Dodd Stadium; Atlanta, GA		L 10–41	45,355	
September 25	1:00 pm	at No. 11 Georgia	Sanford Stadium; Athens, GA	SUN	L 23–24	86,117	
October 2	6:00 pm	Eastern Illinois	Florida Citrus Bowl; Orlando, FL		W 31–21	18,864	
October 16	6:00 pm	Nicholls State	Florida Citrus Bowl; Orlando, FL		W 28–0	13,875	
October 23	6:00 pm	Louisiana Tech	Florida Citrus Bowl; Orlando, FL		L 35–46	16,535	
October 30	4:00 pm	Eastern Michigan	Florida Citrus Bowl; Orlando, FL		W 31–6	27,845	
November 6	2:00 pm	at Auburn	Jordan–Hare Stadium; Auburn, AL	PPV	L 10–28	75,804	
November 13	7:00 pm	at Middle Tennessee State	Johnny "Red" Floyd Stadium; Murfreesboro, TN		W 39–14	10,751	
November 20	1:00 pm	Bowling Green	Florida Citrus Bowl; Orlando, FL		L 30–33 ^{OT}	14,299	
Rankings from AP Poll released prior to the game; All times are in Eastern time

== Game summaries ==
	1	2	3	4	Total
Golden Knights	7	7	7	6	27
Gators	21	27	10	0	58

=== September 11: at Florida ===
For the first time in program history, the Knights traveled to "The Swamp" to take on in-state foe No. 4 Florida Gators. The Gators would win the game decisively, outscoring the Knights 58-27.

In the first haft, Florida would score first, with a 9-yard touchdown pass from quarterback Jesse Palmer. UCF responded with their own touchdown, an 8-yard pass from quarterback Vic Penn. With the successful extra point, the score was tied 7–7. Florida then regained the lead with a 13-yard touchdown pass from Palmer, ending the first quarter with Florida ahead 14–7.

Florida continued its onslaught in the second haft. The Gators extended their lead, adding a touchdown and a field goal to a dominant 58-27 win.

=== September 25: at Georgia - "Burglary Between the Hedges" ===
Burglary Between the Hedges
- Non-conference game
UCF Golden Knights	Georgia Bulldogs
(0–3)	(3–0)
Independent	SEC
23	24
Head coach: Mike Kruczek	Head coach: Jim Donnan
AP / Coaches; — / —	AP / Coaches; 11 / 9
	1	2	3	4	Total
UCF	3	14	0	6	23
Georgia	14	3	7	0	24
- Date: September 25
- Season: 1999
- Stadium: Sanford Stadium
- Location: Athens, Georgia
- Favorite: Georgia by 28
- Attendance: 86,117

United States TV coverage
- Network: MediaOne PPV

The UCF Golden Knights traveled to Athens to take on No. 11 ranked Georgia at Sanford Stadium. The Golden Knights were defeated 24–23 in a game that became known as the "Burglary Between the Hedges." The young UCF program, in only its fourth season in Division I-A, was 0–7 against SEC teams, and in the closing seconds, appeared poised for a historic upset. However, a controversial offensive pass interference penalty thrown by officials in the endzone late in the game took away their chance for victory. The Bulldogs entered the game undefeated and as a 28-point favorite over the 0–3 injury-depleted Golden Knights.

In the first quarter, the Bulldogs jumped out to a 14–3 lead with a 20-yard touchdown pass from Quincy Carter to Terrence Evans, followed by an 8-yard touchdown run by Jasper Sanks. Javier Beorlegui kicked a 28-yard field goal for UCF's first points, but it came moments after Kenny Clark had dropped a touchdown pass in the endzone. Looking to go up by three scores, Georgia gambled on their next drive, going for it on a 4th down & 9 at the UCF 43-yard line. Receiver Michael Greer was tackled by UCF defensive back Davin Bush just inches short of the first down, and the Bulldogs turned the ball over on downs. That crucial stop would set up the Golden Knights first touchdown. It was the first of several miscues by the Bulldogs that kept the game close.

Early in the second quarter, UCF finished off an 11-play, 66-yard drive, that culminated in a 5-yard touchdown run by Page Sessoms. Aided by a 15-yard personal foul penalty against the Bulldogs, the Golden Knights had advanced to the Georgia 12. Facing 4th & Goal at the 6 yard line, RamPage Sessoms slipped by untouched for the score. The deficit was trimmed to 14–10. Georgia went a quick three-and-out on their next drive, setting up a Jonathan Kilgo punt deep in their own territory. Rioct Joseph blocked the punt, and it was recovered by Thad Ward, who returned the ball 6 yards for a UCF touchdown. The Golden Knights led 17–14 with 9:26 remaining in the second quarter. On the next drive, Georgia fumbled away the ball near midfield. With the momentum swinging to UCF, the Golden Knights drove to the 10 yard line. Beorlegui's 27-yard field goal attempt was blocked by Kendrell Bell, and the drive came up empty. In the final minute, the Bulldogs managed a 54-yard field goal by Hap Hines, and a 17–17 halftime tie.

On their first possession of the third quarter, Georgia drove 70 yards in 8 plays for a go-ahead touchdown. Jasper Sanks broke away for a 54-yard run, and a sure touchdown, but he was caught and tackled from behind by Travis Fisher. Moments later, the Bulldogs capped off the drive with a 5-yard touchdown pass from Carter to Michael Greer. At the end of the third quarter, Georgia led 24–17.

In the fourth quarter, UCF put together a superb touchdown drive. UCF drove 89 yards in 12 plays. They never faced a third down. Omari Howard broke away for a 21-yard run down to the Georgia 32, setting the Knights up deep in Bulldogs territory. Vic Penn threw a 5-yard touchdown pass to Page Sessoms, but Javier Beorlegui missed the extra point. The score was now 24–23 with 9:13 remaining in regulation.

With 1:41 left in regulation, trailing by only 1 point, Vic Penn began leading UCF on a hopeful game-winning drive. He swiftly drove the Golden Knights 61 yards to the Bulldogs 20 yard line, spiking the ball with 25 seconds left on the clock. Rather than taking a knee, running out the clock and attempting a 37-yard field goal as time expired, head coach Mike Kruczek decided to call another play. Kruczek admitted "I'm not overwhelmed with confidence in our field goal kicking", after Beorlegui's two earlier misses, and decided to take one last crack at the endzone instead. Penn threw a fade pattern to receiver Kenny Clark on the left front corner of the endzone, but the ball fell incomplete. Bulldogs cornerback Jeff Harris was all over Clark, but a flag was thrown for offensive pass interference. The Golden Knights were backed up 15 yards, and out of field goal range. A sack on the next play set up a desperation pass as time expired. Penn's pass was intercepted, sealing the game for Georgia, and snuffing out the upset bid.

The offensive pass interference penalty was instantly controversial. Observers on both sides of the field were shocked by the call, which was made by an SEC officiating crew. UCF head coach Mike Kruczek said he saw "face guarding, defensive pass interference, plain and simple, and 86,000 people saw the same thing." According to UCF radio announcer Marc Daniels, Harris was blanketing Clark along the sidelines, and "basically tackled Kenny Clark out of bounds." Even Georgia head coach Jim Donnan appeared surprised, conjecturing it was a payback for the 102 yards of penalties Georgia had been assessed, saying "I thought it was a good call, even if it was a bad call - very apropos." He went on to say "We might not be as good as everybody wants us to be." Bulldogs radio announcer Larry Munson believed that UCF "got a really bad break on that call."

Harris claimed he "just tried to put my body between [Clark] and the ball, and he grabbed me." Clark said afterwards "I'm not going to call it a bad call, but I thought it was defensive pass interference. I don't know how they could have made that call." He went on to say UCF "let it slip away, and they [Georgia] know it". Quarterback Vic Penn, who at the time thought the pass attempt was a safe play call, reflected upon the incident saying "no doubt about it, we were robbed." Later in the season, Georgia Tech coach George O'Leary (coincidentally the future UCF coach) was studying game film for his upcoming rivalry game against Georgia. When he came across the play in question he said "Whoaaa, there's those SEC officials again. It was a terrible call."

The Golden Knights had racked up 441 yards of offense with 30 first downs, controlling the clock for nearly 36 minutes. The Bulldogs had 13 penalties for 102 yards and committed the game's only turnover except for Penn's interception on the final play. Though Georgia escaped with the win, they were highly criticized for poor play, particularly on defense. UCF kicker Javier Beorlegui was singled out by many, having missed a field goal, an extra point, and having another field goal attempt blocked - all three of which could have changed the outcome. The game would go down as one of the most devastating losses in school history. The two teams would not play again until the 2010 Liberty Bowl.

=== November 6: at Auburn ===
	1	2	3	4	Total
Golden Knights	0	7	3	0	10
Tigers	7	0	0	21	28

The UCF Golden Knights traveled to Jordan–Hare Stadium to face the Auburn Tigers for the third straight year. Going into the game the Golden Knights were 0–8 against SEC teams, and 0–14 against major Division I-A opponents. The previous season, the Golden Knights had suffered a heartbreaking 10–6 loss at Auburn, and were looking to finally notch a win against a major opponent after a bevy near-misses. With a bowl berth out of the picture for 1999, and with the Tigers in the midst of a five-game losing streak, UCF instead shifted their focus on securing a signature victory to help further their program.

In the first quarter, Auburn quarterback Jeff Klein threw a 20-yard touchdown pass to Tavares Robinson and an early 7–0 Tigers lead. The 73-yard opening drive included a 24-yard run by Heath Evans. However, Auburn's offense would suffer more frustration than success over the next two quarters of play. Pinned back at their own 2 yard line, UCF quarterback Vic Penn threw a crucial 13-yard pass completion to Kenny Clark from his own endzone. On the next play, Penn connected with Charles Lee for an 83-yard touchdown. The Golden Knights tied the game 7–7, despite Lee entering the game suffering from a stomach flu.

At the start of the third quarter, Penn led the Golden Knights on a 9-play, 53-yard drive. Javier Beorlegui kicked a 39-yard field goal to give UCF a 10–7 lead. Later, Golden Knights safety Tommy Shavers intercepted Jeff Klein in the red zone, snuffing out a Tigers scoring opportunity. Auburn kicker Damon Duval missed two field goals wide left, and the Golden Knights clung to the same 10–7 lead at the end of the third quarter.

Vic Penn drove the Golden Knights into Auburn territory early in the fourth quarter. Facing a third down at the Auburn 24 yard line with just over ten minutes left in regulation, Penn barely missed too high an open Charles Lee in the endzone. UCF had to settle for a 43-yard field goal attempt. Beorlegui's kick hit the crossbar, and fell no good. Subsequently, the Tigers drove 70 yards in 16 plays, including five third down conversions, for a go-ahead 16-yard touchdown catch by Reggie Worthy with only 3:41 left in regulation. Trailing 14–10, the Golden Knights were pinned back deep in their own territory. Facing a 4th & 15, Penn was sacked at his own 8 yard line for a turnover on downs. One play later, the Tigers were back in the endzone with an 8-yard touchdown run by Heath Evans. The Golden Knights had one last meaningful possession, but Penn was intercepted by Alex Lincoln who returned the ball 20 yards for a touchdown, and a 28–10 final score.

After trailing much of the game, the Tigers scored three touchdowns in the span of 97 seconds to rally for the victory. The two schools would not play one another again until the 2018 Peach Bowl.
