= Buddy Green (American football) =

American football coach

Playing career

Football
- 1972: NC State

Baseball
- 1972–1974: NC State
- Position: Cornerback (football)

Coaching career (HC unless noted)

Football
- 1977: Mt. Holly JHS (NC)
- 1978: Cherryville HS (NC) (DC)
- 1979: NC State (GA)
- 1980: LSU (assistant)
- 1981: Southern (DC/DB)
- 1982: Northern Nash HS (NC)
- 1983–1984: VMI (DB)
- 1985: Auburn (assistant)
- 1986–1989: NC State (DB)
- 1990–1993: NC State (DC/DB)
- 1994–1999: Chattanooga
- 2000–2001: NC State (DC)
- 2002–2014: Navy (DC/DB)
- 2015: Navy (def. consultant)

Administrative career (AD unless noted)
- 1982–1983: Northern Nash HS (NC)

Head coaching record
- Overall: 27–39 (college)

James "Buddy" Green is an American former football coach. He served as head football coach at the University of Tennessee at Chattanooga from 1994 to 1999, compiling a record of 27–39. Green had two stints as the defensive coordinator at his alma mater, North Carolina State University, from 1990 to 1993 and 2000 to 2001, and a 13-year run as the defensive coordinator at the United States Naval Academy, from 2002 to 2014.

Green played football and baseball at NC State before graduating in 1976.

== Head coaching record ==
=== College ===
Year	Team	Overall	Conference	Standing	Bowl/playoffs
Chattanooga Moccasins/Mocs (Southern Conference) (1994–1999)
1994	Chattanooga	3–8	2–6	T–7th	
1995	Chattanooga	4–7	2–6	T–7th	
1996	Chattanooga	3–8	2–6	T–6th	
1997	Chattanooga	7–4	4–4	T–5th	
1998	Chattanooga	5–6	4–4	T–4th	
1999	Chattanooga	5–6	3–5	6th	
Chattanooga:		27–39	17–31		
Total:		27–39			
