= 1999 Georgia Southern Eagles football team =

American college football season

1999 Georgia Southern Eagles football

NCAA Division I-AA champion SoCon champion

NCAA Division I-AA Championship Game, W 59–24 vs. Youngstown State
- Conference: Southern Conference

Ranking
- Sports Network: No. 1
- Record: 13–2 (7–1 SoCon)
- Head coach: Paul Johnson (3rd season)
- Offensive coordinator: Mike Sewak (3rd season)
- Offensive scheme: Triple option
- Defensive coordinator: Rusty Russell (3rd season)
- Base defense: 4–3
- Home stadium: Paulson Stadium

1999 Southern Conference football standings
	Conf.			Overall
Team	W		L	W		L
No. 1 Georgia Southern +^	7	–	1	13	–	2
No. 9 Appalachian State +^	7	–	1	9	–	3
No. 12 Furman +^	7	–	1	9	–	3
Wofford	5	–	3	6	–	5
East Tennessee State	4	–	4	6	–	5
Chattanooga	3	–	5	5	–	6
Western Carolina	2	–	6	3	–	8
The Citadel	1	–	7	2	–	9
VMI	0	–	8	1	–	10
+ – Conference co-champions; ^ – NCAA Division I-AA playoff participant; Rankings from The Sports Network poll

The 1999 Georgia Southern Eagles football team represented Georgia Southern University as a member of the Southern Conference (SoCon) during the 1999 NCAA Division I-AA football season. Led by third-year head coach Paul Johnson, the Eagles compiled an overall record of 13–2 with a conference mark of 7–1, winning the SoCon title. Georgia Southern defeated Youngstown State in the 1999 NCAA Division I-AA Football Championship Game to win the program's fifth NCAA Division I-AA title. The Eagles played their home games at Paulson Stadium in Statesboro, Georgia.

== Schedule ==
Date	Time	Opponent	Rank	Site	Result	Attendance	Source
September 4		Fayetteville State*	No. 1	Paulson Stadium; Statesboro, GA	W 76–0	15,876	
September 11	7:00 p.m.	at Wofford	No. 1	Gibbs Stadium; Spartanburg, SC	W 55–14	8,048	
September 18	6:30 pm	at Oregon State*	No. 1	Reser Stadium; Corvallis, OR	L 41–48	27,031	
September 25		Chattanooga	No. 1	Paulson Stadium; Statesboro, GA	W 49–10	14,746	
October 2	1:00 pm	at VMI	No. 1	Alumni Memorial Field; Lexington, VA	W 50–14	5,967	
October 9		Western Carolina	No. 1	Paulson Stadium; Statesboro, GA	W 70–7	16,406	
October 16		at No. 11 Appalachian State	No. 1	Kidd Brewer Stadium; Boone, NC	L 16–17	19,891	
October 23		The Citadel	No. 5	Paulson Stadium; Statesboro, GA	W 34–17	18,536	
October 30		at No. 19 East Tennessee State	No. 4	Memorial Center; Johnson City, TN	W 55–6	5,953	
November 6		No. 7 Furman	No. 4	Paulson Stadium; Statesboro, GA	W 41–38	18,636	
November 13		at Jacksonville State*	No. 3	Paul Snow Stadium; Jacksonville, AL	W 51–14	8,639	
November 27		No. 17 Northern Arizona*	No. 2	Paulson Stadium; Statesboro, GA (NCAA Division I-AA First Round)	W 72–29	7,140	
December 4	1:00 pm	No. 10 UMass*	No. 2	Paulson Stadium; Statesboro, GA (NCAA Division I-AA Quarterfinal)	W 38–21	13,121	
December 11		No. 5 Illinois State*	No. 2	Paulson Stadium; Statesboro, GA (NCAA Division I-AA Semifinal)	W 28–17	12,299	
December 18		vs. No. 9 Youngstown State*	No. 2	Finley Stadium; Chattanooga, TN (NCAA Division I-AA Championship Game)	W 59–24	20,052	
*Non-conference game; Rankings from The Sports Network Poll released prior to the game; All times are in Eastern time
