= Toronto Tigers =

American football team

- Established: 1962
- Folded: 1965
- Based in: Toronto, Ohio
- Home stadium: Toronto Junior/Senior High School
- League: Midwest Football League (1964)

The Toronto Tigers were a semi-professional American football team that played from 1962 to 1964. The team was based in Toronto, Ohio, and played in the Midwest Football League in 1964. They were coached by Clarke Hinkle in 1962 and Jack Stutz from 1963 to 1964.

== History ==
=== 1962 season ===
The Toronto Tigers were founded in August 1962, with former Green Bay Packers player Clarke Hinkle as the head coach and Joseph Hollister as general manager. A semi-professional team, it was considered part of the Weirton–Steubenville metropolitan area. Their first game was against the Washington Merchants of the Steel Bowl Conference on September 23, 1962, (losing 21–6), and they were scheduled to play against the Pittsburgh Colts the following week. The Tigers lost a rematch to the Merchants on October 13, by a score of 12–6. The mayor of Toronto declared October 20, 1962, as "Toronto Tigers Day" in honor of the team's game against the Ambridge A's that day; they lost 19–12. They played against the Stark Pros on October 27 and the Ambridge A's again on November 3. In the loss against the Pros, the Tigers' starting quarterback Jim Hays suffered a season-ending injury. They had a rematch with the Pros, which were renamed the Canton Bulldogs in between matchups, on November 10, in which the Tigers won their first game of the season, 26–6. The Tigers played against the Verona Raiders on November 17.

=== 1963 season ===
The Tigers were expected to join the Ohio–Pennsylvania Football League for the 1963 season. Training camp for the 1963 season began on August 1, 1963, with an exhibition game against the Canton Bulldogs scheduled for August 31, 1963. Hinkle resigned as head coach at the start of the season in a dispute over player compensation and debts. He remained vice president of the club, and Jack Stutz was subsequently named head coach. The first game of the season was a win against the Bulldogs of the Ohio–Pennsylvania Football League on September 14, 1963. They played against the Macomb County Arrows of the Midwest Football League the following two weeks, losing both games. On October 12, they beat the Millvale Indians by a score of 62–12. They won against the Hazelwood Steelers on October 19, and the Niagara Falls All Stars, on October 26. The Tigers won against the farm team for the Hamilton Tiger-Cats of the Canadian Football League, 52–2, on November 2. On November 9, Toronto played against the Pittsburgh Collegiates. The Tigers had an 8–2 record in 1963.

=== 1964 season ===
Toronto was announced as a new team in the Midwest Football League in March 1964. Stutz was re-elected as head coach of the Tigers in August 1964, with Hinkle staying on as vice president. They played their games in 1964 at Toronto Junior/Senior High School. The Tigers played exhibition games against the Wheeling Ironmen of the United Football League on August 18, 1964, and against the McKeesport Ironmen of the Atlantic Coast Football League on August 29. Their regular season opening game was against the Dayton Colts on September 12, and their second game was against the Lansing All Stars on September 19.

The team did not show up to a game against the Lansing All Stars, and were subsequently removed from the league in the middle of the season. They finished with a record of 1–9 for the season. Following the season, the Tigers folded.

== Season-by-season results ==
Year	League	W	L	T	Finish	Coach
1962	Independent	Unknown			N/A	Clarke Hinkle
1963	Independent	8	2	0	Unknown	Jack Stutz
1964	Midwest Football League	1	9	0	6th	Jack Stutz
