= Midwest Football League (1962–1978) =

American football league (1962–78)

- Sport: American football
- Founded: 1962
- Folded: 1979
- Claim to fame: The last league to feature NFL farm teams
- No. of teams: varied (from 4 to 8)
- Most titles: Macomb County / Pontiac / Michigan Arrows (6)

The Midwest Football League (MFL) was a low-level professional American football minor league that played games from 1962 to 1978. The league was based mainly in Michigan, until the collapse of the Continental Football League in 1969, when it became more of a regional league.

During its lifetime, the MFL had a working relationship with the National Football League (NFL), as the NFL had the right to sign any player at any time from the league for $1000, while the Cincinnati Bengals and Cleveland Browns had agreements with the Columbus Bucks and Youngstown Hardhats (respectively), and the Detroit Lions had agreements with both the Indy Caps and Lansing All Stars, to act as farm teams.

== History ==
=== Formation ===
By April 1961, six cities had been approved for franchises in the Midwest Football League: Cleveland, Columbus, and Toledo, Ohio; Grand Rapids, Michigan; Indianapolis; and Louisville, Kentucky. Players were to be paid $50 salaries per game played, with 30 players on each team's roster. The league played its games on Saturday nights. George Gareff from Columbus was initially league commissioner, with Homer VanHablenbeck from Detroit gaining the title by 1962.

A group of Des Moines, Iowa, investors applied for a franchise in the league in April 1961. New teams were to pay a $2,000 fee to join the league and send a $5,000 security deposit to ensure the full season would be played. The Lakeview Athletic Club Bears joined the league on January 28, 1962.

The six initial teams in the league were announced on January 31, 1962, as the Battle Creek Bears, Dearborn Vikings, Detroit Rockets, Lansing All Stars, Macomb County Arrows (also called the Mt. Clemens Arrows), and Toledo Thunderbirds. The Lansing All Stars were an independent team in the 1961 season. An application for a franchise from Dayton, Ohio, was approved on March 11, 1962. The Battle Creek, Dayton, and Toledo franchises did not play in the 1962 season.

=== 1962 season ===
The 1962 season began on September 8, 1962, with four teams participating. The Mt. Clemens/Macomb County Arrows were declared league champions for the 1962 season, after beating the Dearborn Vikings 34–20 in the title game.

1962 Midwest Football League standings
Team	W	L	T	PCT
Mt. Clemens/Macomb County Arrows†	5	1	0	.833
Dearborn Vikings	4	2	0	.666
Detroit Rockets	2	4	0	.333
Lansing All Stars	1	5	0	.167

† Midwest Football League champions.

=== 1963 season ===
The Spartan Athletic Club received approval to join the league in April 1963, and they initially chose a team name of Dayton Spartans. They were later called the Cedarville Spartans. The Dayton franchise had previously played in the American Football Conference as the Dayton Triangles from 1959 to 1961. The Battle Creek Bears (also known as the Cereal City Bears) joined for the 1963 season, after initially being accepted into the league in 1962. Six teams participated in the 1963 season.

The Arrows won the league championship for a second year in a row after posting a record of 13–1, including a 9–1 record in league play. The Spartans, who finished second in the league in 1963 after going 6–3–1, played against the Hudson Bar in a game called the Semi-Pro Bowl on December 14, 1963. The All Stars placed third for the season with a record of 5–4–1.

1963 Midwest Football League standings
Team	W	L	T	PCT
Macomb County Arrows†	9	1	0	.900
Cedarville Spartans (Note: The Dayton Daily News reported the Cedarville Spartans' record for 1963 as 6–3–1, while Outsiders II stated they had a 5–2–2 record with a note about missing information.)	6	3	1	.650
Lansing All Stars (Note: The Lansing State Journal reported the Lansing All Stars' record for 1963 as 5–4–1, while Outsiders II stated they had a 6–3–1 record.)	5	4	1	.550
Detroit Rockets	4	5	1	.450
Petersburg/Dearborn Vikings	2	8	0	.200
Cereal City Bears	1	9	0	.100

† Midwest Football League champions.

=== 1964 season ===
Ed McCracken from Dayton was elected league commissioner in March 1964. The league also added teams in Toronto, Ohio, and Van Wert, Ohio. The Van Wert team was named the Van Wert Tigers, but they did not participate in the 1964 season. (Note: According to 1964 league standings.) The Toronto team was the Toronto Tigers. The Cedarville Spartans became the Dayton Colts in 1964, and the Cereal City Bears did not return after the 1963 season.

The Association of Minor Football Leagues was formed in April 1964, with the Midwest Football League joining with five of the other seven minor league football teams in the country. The other leagues to join were the Atlantic Coast Football League, Central States Football League, New England Football Conference, Southern Football League, and United Football League. McCracken was named secretary of the association.

1964 Midwest Football League standings
Team	W	L	T	PCT
Lansing All Stars†	8	2	0	.800
Dearborn Vikings	7	3	0	.700
Dayton Colts	6	4	0	.600
Macomb County Arrows	6	4	0	.600
Detroit Rockets	2	8	0	.200
Toronto Tigers	1	9	0	.100

† Midwest Football League champions.

The Lansing All-Stars played against the Central States Football League champion Racine Raiders in an exhibition game after the season on November 28, 1964.

The Toronto team did not show up to a game against Lansing, and were subsequently removed from the league in the middle of the season. The Detroit Rockets were removed from the league after the season after they did not adhere to financial protocols.

=== 1965 season ===
In searching for two new teams to join the league for the 1965 season, following the expulsion of the Detroit and Toronto franchises, commissioner Ed McCracken asked for a $300 new team fee with a security deposit of $200. The Macomb County Arrows became the Pontiac Arrows and the Dearborn Vikings became the Milan Vikings for the 1965 season. A Flint, Michigan, team called the Flint Blue Devils joined the league. A team from Sturgis, Michigan, played some games against league members in the hopes of joining the league for the 1966 season.

Dayton was purchased by a new ownership group in 1965.

1965 Midwest Football League standings
Team	W	L	T	PCT
Pontiac Arrows†	6	2	0	.750
Dayton Colts	5	2	1	.688
Lansing All Stars	3	4	1	.438
Flint Blue Devils	2	4	2	.375
Milan Vikings	2	6	0	.250

† Midwest Football League champions.

The Dayton Colts had to cancel and forfeit a game against Milan due to bad weather. Dayton scheduled the game to be played at a local high school football field, but the school would not allow the game to be played, citing a long-standing policy about wet fields. Dayton was placed a one-year probation by the league as punishment.

The Pontiac Arrows were named league champions, and they went against players from the other four teams in an all-star game on November 13, 1965.

=== 1966 season ===
John Abel from Pontiac was named commissioner of the league in January 1966, replacing McCracken, who resigned to be the head coach for the Dayton Colts.

The Milan franchise was moved to Ypsilanti, Michigan, to become the Ypsilanti Vikings. The Detroit Rockets franchise rejoined the league in River Rouge, Michigan, as the River Rouge Steelers. The Dayton Colts played an exhibition game of basketball with the National Football League's Cleveland Browns in March 1966 as a fundraiser.

1966 Midwest Football League standings
Team	W	L	T	PCT
Pontiac Arrows†	9	0	1	.950
Ypsilanti Vikings	7	3	0	.700
Dayton Colts (Note: The Lansing State Journal reported the Dayton Colts' final record as 5–4–1, which would be the third tie in the standings. It is impossible for an odd-number of total ties to have occurred, and Outsiders II shows the Colts' record for 1966 as 6–4–0.)	6	4	0	.600
Flint Blue Devils	5	4	1	.550
Lansing All Stars	2	8	0	.200
River Rouge Steelers	0	10	0	.000

† Midwest Football League champions.

The Pontiac Arrows were named league champions for the second straight season, and they went against players from the other five teams in an all-star game on November 12, 1966.

=== 1967 season ===
The River Rouge Steelers became the Detroit Steelers, the Flint Blue Devils became the Flint Wildcats, and the Pontiac Arrows moved back to Mt. Clemens to become the Michigan Arrows for the 1967 season. The Pontiac Firebirds joined the league as a new franchise. Former NFL star Tom Tracy was named head coach. The one-time Detroit Lions fullback led the team to a 10–2 record and second-place finish in the regular season.

The Lansing All Stars signed their players to $1 per year contracts in 1967 due to financial constraints. In October 1967, the NFL agreed to pay MFL teams $1,000 to sign a player off of their rosters.

1967 Midwest Football League standings
Team	W	L	T	PCT
Michigan Arrows†	11	1	0	.917
Pontiac Firebirds	10	2	0	.818
Ypsilanti Vikings	8	4	0	.727
Dayton Colts	7	5	0	.583
Flint Wildcats	2	9	1	.208
Lansing All Stars*	2	9	0	.182
Detroit Steelers*	0	10	1	.045

† Midwest Football League champions.
* Record before final game of season.

=== 1968 season ===
A franchise from Lackawanna, New York, joined the league in April 1968, as the Lackawanna Lancers. The Detroit Steelers moved to Hamtramck, Michigan, to become the Hamtramck Chargers for the 1968 season. The Lansing All Stars team folded before the 1968 due to financial reasons. The Dayton Colts were sold to Recreation Projects, Inc. in April 1968. The Michigan Arrows were purchased by a group from Fort Wayne, Indiana, and subsequently relocated to the city to become the Fort Wayne Tigers. The Flint franchise was part owned by Minnesota Vikings player Paul Krause.

1968 Midwest Football League standings
Team	W	L	T	PCT
Dayton Colts†	12	0	0	1.000
Lackawanna Lancers*	6	2	0	.750
Flint Wildcats	7	5	0	.583
Pontiac Firebirds*	5	4	0	.556
Hamtramck Chargers*	3	6	0	.333
Ypsilanti Vikings*	2	7	0	.222
Fort Wayne Tigers*	0	8	0	.000

† Midwest Football League champions.
* Record after eighth or ninth game of season.

In the all-star game on November 16, 1968, the Dayton Colts beat the team of league all-stars, 43–0. They were the first team in league history to go undefeated in a season after posting a 12–0 record.

=== 1969 season ===
The Lansing All Stars rejoined the league for the 1969 season. The Southwestern Michigan Hawks were accepted into the league in April 1969. The Fort Wayne Tigers became the Grand Rapids Chiefs, and Grand Rapids paid $1,000 as an entry fee. The Hamtramck Chargers became the Detroit Cowboys for the 1969 season. The Ypsilanti Vikings left the league before the season.

A two-division structure of the league began in the 1969 season, with Dayton, Lackawanna, Grand Rapids, and Southwestern Michigan making up the Lakes division, and Detroit, Flint, Lansing, and Pontiac being in the Central division. Detroit was removed from the league in the middle of the season.

1969 Midwest Football League standings
Central Division
Team	W	L	T	PCT
Lansing All Stars†	12	1	1	.893
Pontiac Firebirds	10	3	1	.750
Flint Wildcats	2	12	0	.143
Detroit Cowboys	0	14	0	.000
Lakes Division
Team	W	L	T	PCT
Lackawanna Lancers‡	11	3	0	.786
Dayton Colts	10	4	0	.714
Southwestern Michigan Hawks	5	9	0	.357
Grand Rapids Chiefs	5	9	0	.357

† Midwest Football League champions.
‡ Won division.

The Lansing All Stars won the Central Division with a record of 12–1–1 and the Lackawanna Lancers won the Lakes Division after going 11–3. Lansing defeated Lackawanna, 20–8, in the first MFL Championship Game on November 8, 1969. The All Stars received a championship bonus of $500 after the game.

=== 1970 season ===
John Abel, the commissioner for the league, died in March 1970. Keith Bacon became the new commissioner by July 1970. The Dayton Colts were suspended for the season due to financial conditions, but fielded an independent team and played games against members of the league. The Flint Wildcats did not return for the 1970 season. The Grand Rapids Chiefs became the Wyoming Chiefs, and the Southwest Michigan Hawks were renamed the Michiana Hawks. The Hawks played their home games in Buchanan, Michigan.

A four-team playoff system was enacted for the season, with the regular season first-place team playing the third-place team and second place playing fourth place in the first round, and the winners of those games playing in a championship game.

1970 Midwest Football League standings
Team	W	L	T	PCT
Lansing All Stars†	10	0	0	1.000
Pontiac Firebirds‡	8	2	0	.800
Michiana Hawks‡*	5	5	0	.500
Lackawanna Lancers‡*	5	5	0	.500
Wyoming Chiefs	1	9	0	.100
Detroit Cowboys	1	9	0	.100

† Midwest Football League champions.
‡ Playoff team.
* Tie in standings between Michiana and Lackawanna broken by a coin toss to determine playoff opponents. Michiana won and chose to face Pontiac in the first round of the playoffs.

==== 1970 playoffs ====
The Lansing All Stars defeated the Lackawanna Lancers, 60–0, and the Pontiac Firebirds beat the Michiana Hawks, 35–14, in the first round of the playoffs on October 24, 1970. Lansing won over Pontiac in the championship game, 28–6, on October 31, 1970, for their second straight championship win.

Semi-finals
1	All Stars	60
3	Lancers	0
2	Firebirds	35
4	Hawks	14

Championship game
1	All Stars	28
2	Firebirds	6

Lansing later scheduled two games against the champions of the Midwest Professional Football League, the Joliet Chargers, one on each team's field, following their MWL championship win. The first game was called the "Champions Bowl". Lansing won the first matchup on November 14, 1970, with a score of 33–7. Joliet won the second game on November 21, 1970, going up 21–3.

=== 1971 season ===
The Lackawanna Lancers moved to Niagara Falls, New York, as the Niagara Falls Lancers, and the Detroit Cowboys moved back to Hamtramck to become the Hamtramck Chargers again. The Flint Wildcats returned for the 1971 season. The Wyoming Chiefs became the Wyoming Cowboys in 1971. The Dayton Colts returned to the league in 1971, moved to Columbus, Ohio, in April, and became the Columbus Bucks.

The teams were divided into two divisions again for the season. The Central Division comprised Flint, Hamtramck, Lansing, and Wyoming, while the Lakes Division was made from Columbus, Michiana, Niagara Falls, and Pontiac. A divisional round of the playoffs was reinstated for the 1971 season. The league prevented players being paid salaries for 1971 after financial struggles the previous season. Bill Byrne, president of the Bucks, was elected vice president of the league in September 1971.

1971 Midwest Football League standings
Central Division
Team	W	L	T	PCT
Lansing All Stars‡	12	1	1	.893
Flint Wildcats‡	8	6	0	.571
Hamtramck Chargers (Note: Outsiders II shows the Chargers' record for 1971 as 2–12–0.)	3	11	0	.214
Wyoming Cowboys	1	12	1	.107
Lakes Division
Team	W	L	T	PCT
Columbus Bucks†	13	0	1	.964
Niagara Falls Lancers‡	9	5	0	.643
Pontiac Firebirds	7	7	0	.500
Michiana Hawks	1	12	1	.107

† Midwest Football League champions.
‡ Playoff team.

==== 1971 playoffs ====
The Lansing All Stars won the Central Division and the Columbus Bucks won the Lakes Division. The Bucks were scheduled to play the second-place team in the Central Division, the Flint Wildcats, in the first round of the playoffs, but the opponent was replaced by the Michigan Barons due to eligibility concerns with Flint's roster. The Barons were made up of players from the Flint and Pontiac rosters. In the divisional round of the playoffs, Lansing defeated the Niagara Falls Lancers, 17–0, while Columbus beat the Barons, 34–0, on November 6, 1971. On November 13, 1971, Columbus won the league championship with a win over Lansing, by a score of 20–17.

Semi-finals
C1	All Stars	17
L2	Lancers	0
L1	Bucks	34
C2	Barons	0

Championship game
C1	All Stars	17
L1	Bucks	20

After the championship game, Lansing and Columbus played against the Pennsylvania Bruins of the Interstate League. The Columbus–Pennsylvania game was called the "Ohio Mini Super Bowl", with Columbus winning 44–13 in the November 20 game. Lansing won the November 26 game, 32–14.

=== 1972 season ===
In September 1971, the league announced franchises in Indianapolis; Harrisburg, Pennsylvania; Dayton, Ohio; and Massillon, Ohio. The Indianapolis franchise was called the Indiana Caps, which competed in the Atlantic Coast Football League in 1970 as the Indianapolis Capitols. A team from Joliet, Illinois, was expected to join the league in 1972. Franchises in Youngstown, Ohio; Indianapolis; and Warren, Michigan, were accepted into the league in December 1971. The Youngstown franchise was called the Youngstown Hardhats. Dayton and Louisville were prospective cities for new franchises in January 1972. The Michiana Hawks took a leave of absence from the league for the 1972 season due to financial problems. The Wyoming Cowboys and Pontiac Firebirds left the league, and the Hamtrmack Chargers moved back to Detroit before the season to become the Detroit Warriors. The Niagara Falls Lancers also left the league before the season. The Flint Wildcats became the Flint Sabres.

Youngstown had an agreement with the Cleveland Browns to act as their farm team for the 1972 season. In March 1972, the MFL joined the Independent Professional Football Leagues of America, which included the Midwest Professional Football League, Central States Football League, Southwestern Football League, Seaboard Football League, and Texas League.

The 1972 season began on July 8, 1972. Players earned between $50 and $200 per game in 1972. On September 1, 1972, the Lansing All Stars were purchased by Ed Dubaj, Joe Cox, and three other buyers, from Gene Howard for a sale price of $18,500. League commissioner Keith Bacon resigned on November 12, 1972.

1972 Midwest Football League standings
Team	W	L	T	PCT
Indiana Caps†	8	2	0	.800
Youngstown Hardhats‡	8	2	0	.800
Columbus Bucks	7	3	0	.700
Lansing All Stars	5	5	0	.500
Flint Sabres	2	8	0	.200
Detroit Warriors	0	10	0	.000

† Midwest Football League champions.
‡ Playoff team.

The Indiana Caps and Youngstown Hardhats each finished with 8–2 records during the regular season, and played each other in a playoff for the championship on October 14, 1972. Indiana won, 26–14.

=== 1973 season ===
Ted Plascik was named new league commissioner by January 1973. The league filed a lawsuit against its former commissioner Keith Bacon in May 1973 for $15,000 for financial fraud during his time as head of the league.

The West Virginia Hillbillies were granted a franchise in the league for the 1973 season in May 1972, but backed out of the league in August 1972. A team from Fort Wayne, Indiana, was going to join the league. The Michiana Hawks rejoined the league for the 1973 season. The Columbus Bucks became the Columbus Brewers before the season, and then later the Columbus Barons. The Indiana Caps became the Hoosier Caps in April 1973, but were renamed again in June as the Indy Caps. The Detroit Warriors became the Detroit Giants and left the league.

Three teams had agreements with National Football League (NFL) teams to act as farm teams: Columbus with the Cincinnati Bengals, Hoosier with the Detroit Lions, and Youngstown with the Cleveland Browns. Lansing negotiated with the Lions to have a similar deal in February 1973, and agreed to a player exchange deal with the Toronto Argonauts of the Canadian Football League (CFL) in May 1973. By August 1973, the NFL had sent $11,000 to MFL teams during the season in exchange for being able to sign 11 of their players.

1973 Midwest Football League standings
Team	W	L	T	PCT
Indy Caps†	8	2	0	.800
Youngstown Hardhats	8	2	0	.800
Flint Sabres	7	2	1	.750
Columbus Barons	3	7	0	.300
Lansing All Stars	2	7	1	.250
Michiana Hawks	1	9	0	.100

† Midwest Football League champions.

The Indy Caps and Youngstown Hardhats finished the regular season with the same record and were going to face each other in a playoff for the championship. Instead, Indy was named champion after a coin toss, and they played against the Fort Wayne Champions the following week and won, 41–0.

=== 1974 season ===
The Pontiac Arrows and the Detroit Warriors franchises returned to the league in 1974. (Note: The Indianapolis Star reported in May 1974 that the Pontiac Firebirds and Detroit were members of the league for the 1974 season. Pontiac later changed its name to the Pontiac Arrows and the Detroit franchise was the returning Detroit Warriors team that had an independent schedule in 1973. It is not known whether the Pontiac Arrows are the franchise known as the Pontiac Firebirds from 1967 to 1971, the Arrows franchise that was in the league under various names from 1962 to 1971, or a new club.) The Columbus Barons left the league before the start of the regular season, and the Michiana Hawks did not return. (Note: The team was not listed as a member of the league for the 1974 season.) The league was divided into two divisions for the 1974 season: Division A was Indy, Lansing, and Pontiac; Division B was Detroit, Flint, and Youngstown. Division A later became the Capitol Division and Division B turned into the Lakes Division. The MFL made an agreement with the World Football League (WFL) that the WFL would send MFL teams $500 for each player it signed away.

1974 Midwest Football League standings
Capitol Division
Team	W	L	T	PCT
Indy Caps‡	9	1	0	.900
Pontiac Arrows	4	6	0	.400
Lansing All Stars	2	8	0	.200
Lakes Division
Team	W	L	T	PCT
Flint Sabres†	9	1	0	.900
Youngstown Hardhats*	5	4	0	.600
Detroit Warriors*	0	9	0	.000

† Midwest Football League champions.
‡ Won division.
* The final game of the season between Detroit and Youngstown was canceled.

The championship game was called the "1974 Midwest Mini-Super Bowl" between the leaders of each division, the Indy Caps and Flint Sabres. Flint won the game on September 28, 1974, by a score of 15–2.

=== 1975 season ===
The Lansing All Stars were renamed as the Lansing Professional Football Club under new ownership immediately following the 1974 season, then to the Lansing Capitals in June 1975. The Youngstown Hardhats folded after the 1974 season, the Indy Caps withdrew from the league, and the Detroit Warriors left the league. The Dayton Colts were brought back to the league for the 1975 season. The Pontiac Arrows became the Oakland Arrows for the 1975 season, and the Michigan Indians and Cleveland Academes joined the league, with the Academes serving as a farm team for the Cleveland Browns.

Turf Kauffman was elected league commissioner following the ouster of Ted Piascik by June 1975.

1975 Midwest Football League standings
Central Division
Team	W	L	T	PCT
Flint Sabres†	9	1	0	.900
Dayton Colts	5	5	0	.500
Lansing Capitals	4	6	0	.400
Lakes Division
Team	W	L	T	PCT
Oakland Arrows‡	8	2	0	.800
Cleveland Academes	4	6	0	.400
Michigan Indians	0	10	0	.000

† Midwest Football League champions.
‡ Playoff team.

The Flint Sabres and Oakland Arrows won their divisions and played each other in a championship game on November 1, 1975. Flint won its second straight championship in the 35–13 victory.

=== 1976 season ===
In December 1975, a potential merger between the MFL and Central States Football League was discussed, but no agreement was made. Turf Kauffman resigned as league commissioner in April 1976 to become head coach for the Pontiac Arrows, with Steve Graves named acting commissioner.

The Oakland Arrows became the Pontiac Arrows again, and the Youngstown Hardhats returned for the 1976 season. The Dayton Colts folded before the 1976 season. The Flint Sabres, after winning their opening game, dropped out of the league due to financial issues and forfeited the rest of their games.

1976 Midwest Football League standings
Central Division
Team	W	L	T	PCT
Lansing Capitals‡	6	4	0	.600
Michigan Indians	2	8	0	.200
Flint Sabres	1	9	0	.100
Lakes Division
Team	W	L	T	PCT
Pontiac Arrows†	10	0	0	1.000
Youngstown Hardhats	8	2	0	.800
Cleveland Academes	3	7	0	.300

† Midwest Football League champions.
‡ Won division.

No championship game was played after the 1976 regular season due to Flint's withdrawal in the middle of the season, and Pontiac was named the champion.

=== 1977 season ===
The Lansing Capitals and Michigan Indians returned for the 1977 season. The Columbus Stingers and Indy Superstars joined the league in 1977. The Cleveland Academes and Pontiac Arrows left the league after the 1976 season, and the Youngstown Hardhats moved to the Mid-Atlantic Football League.

1977 Midwest Football League standings
Team	W	L	T	PCT
Columbus Stingers†	6	0	0	1.000
Lansing Capitals	4	2	0	.667
Indy Superstars	2	4	0	.333
Michigan Indians	0	6	0	.000

† Midwest Football League champions.

=== 1978 season ===
The Wyoming Cobras and Kalamazoo All-Stars were new franchises in 1978, while the Columbus Metros replaced the Stingers on May 9, 1978. The Indy Superstars became the Indy Kaps for the 1978 season. The Northern Division was made up of the Lansing Capitals, Michigan Indians, and Wyoming Cobras; the Southern Division comprised Columbus Metros, Indy Kaps, and Kalamazoo All-Stars. A four-team playoff was established for the postseason. The Metros had a budget of $100,000 for the season.

The Indians forfeited a game against the Metros on August 12 for not having a playing field, and the team folded during the 1978 season.

1978 Midwest Football League standings
Northern Division
Team	W	L	T	PCT
Lansing Capitals‡	4	6	0	.400
Michigan Indians	Unknown			
Wyoming Cobras	Unknown			
Southern Division
Team	W	L	T	PCT
Kalamazoo All-Stars‡	9	1	0	.900
Columbus Metros†	6	1	0	.857
Indy Kaps‡	6	4	0	.600

† Midwest Football League champions.
‡ Playoff team.

==== 1978 playoffs ====
In the first round of the playoffs, the Columbus Metros beat the short-handed Lansing Capitals 50–7; after the game it was discovered that Lansing came to the game with less than 15 players, which was below the league minimum of 25, and, to make up the difference, several trainers and players from Columbus were enlisted as Capitals players. In the other semifinal game, the Kalamazoo All-Stars won over the Indy Kaps, 38–28. Columbus defeated Kalamazoo, 38–6, in the championship game.

Semi-finals
1	All-Stars	38
4	Kaps	28
2	Capitals	7
3	Metros	50

Championship game
1	All-Stars	6
3	Metros	38

After the season, the Metros played four more exhibition games in an attempt to be named "National Semi-Professional Champions" by Pro Football Weekly. Despite winning all four, including a win against the then-No. 1-ranked team Delavan Red Devils from the Northern States Football League, Columbus finished the season at second place in the rankings.

=== Post-league ===
The Indy Kaps moved to the Northern States Football League (NSFL) after the 1978 season to become the Indianapolis Caps again. The Kalamazoo All-Stars and Wyoming Cobras also joined the NSFL by 1980. The Lansing Capitals withdrew from the league in 1979, and opted to join the Michigan Charity Football League in 1980. The Columbus Metros joined the Mid-Atlantic Football League in 1979.

== Notable players ==
- Mel Anthony, Ypsilanti Vikings
- Tom Beard, Lansing All Stars
- Dave Behrman, Lansing All Stars / Flint Sabres / Lansing Capitals
- Dick Biddle, Youngstown Hardhats
- Jim Brandstatter, Lansing All Stars / Capitals
- Tom Cecchini, Ypsilanti Vikings
- Dana Coin, Flint Sabres
- King Corcoran, Flint Sabres
- Bob Ferguson, Dayton Colts
- Dave Fisher, Ypsilanti Vikings
- Cornelius Greene, Columbus Stingers / Metros
- Ron Goovert, Lansing All Stars / Flint Sabres
- Jim Hayes, Columbus Bucks / Barons
- Chuck Heater, Pontiac Arrows
- Terry Hoeppner, Indiana Caps
- Steve Juday, Ypsilanti Vikings
- Jim Kearney, Ypsilanti Vikings
- Dan LaRose, Pontiac Firebirds
- Art Laster, Indiana Caps
- Quentin Lowry, Youngstown Hardhats
- Frank Wayne Marsh, Ypsilanti Vikings
- Buster Mathis, Grand Rapids Chiefs
- Pete Mikolajewski, Dayton Colts
- Pete Mills, Lackawanna Lancers
- Tom Myers, Pontiac Arrows
- Bob Olson, Flint Sabres
- Lou Piccone, Youngstown Hardhats
- Dave Porter, Lansing All Stars
- Nick Roman, Columbus Bucks
- Tom Slade, Flint Sabres
- Willie Spencer, Indiana Caps
- Karl Sweetan, Pontiac Arrows
- Pete Tillotson, Michigan Arrows
- Tom Tracy, Pontiac Firebirds
- John Walton, Columbus Barons
- Allan Watson, Youngstown Hardhats
- Charlie Wedemeyer, Lansing All Stars
- Cal Withrow, Dayton Colts

== Bibliography ==
- Gill, Bob; Maher, Tod; Brainerd, Steve (2010). Outsiders II: Minor League and Independent Football 1951–1985. St. Johann Press. ISBN 9781878282651.
