= Jim Hayes (American football) =

American football player and coach (1940–2001)

No. 62
- Position: Defensive lineman

Personal information
- Born: November 26, 1940 (Note: Hayes said in November 1971 that he was 42 years old, despite the Columbus Bucks' team program listing him at 29 years old. This would make his birth date c.1928 or 1929.); Meridian, Mississippi
- Died: April 19, 2001 (aged 60); Meridian, Mississippi
- Listed height: 6 ft 4 in (1.93 m)
- Listed weight: 263 lb (119 kg)

Career information
- College: Jackson State

Career history

Playing
- Minnesota Vikings (1963)*; Charleston Rockets (1964); Houston Oilers (1965–1966); Indianapolis Capitols (1968–1970); Columbus Bucks / Barons (1971–1973)
- * Offseason or practice squad member only

Coaching
- Columbus Bucks / Barons (1971–1973) Defensive line coach

Awards and highlights
- Continental Football League champion (1969); Midwest Football League champion (1971); Second-team CFL All-Star (1968); CFL All-Central (1968)
- Stats at Pro Football Reference

James William Hayes (November 26, 1940 – April 19, 2001) was an American football defensive lineman who played for two seasons in the American Football League (AFL) for the Houston Oilers. After playing college football for Jackson State, he signed with the Minnesota Vikings of the National Football League (NFL) in 1963. He also played for the Charleston Rockets of the United Football League, Indianapolis Capitols of the Continental Football League and Atlantic Coast Football League, and Columbus Bucks / Barons of the Midwest Football League.

== Early life ==
Hayes had nine siblings. He played quarterback and fullback at T. J. Harris High School in Meridian, Mississippi.

== College career ==
Hayes played college football for Jackson State. He was named to the Little All-America teams for his junior and senior seasons.

== Professional career ==
Hayes signed with the Minnesota Vikings of the National Football League (NFL) on January 9, 1963. He spent the season on the team's taxi squad. He played with the Charleston Rockets of the United Football League in 1964. He played with the Houston Oilers of the American Football League in 1965. He re-signed with the Oilers on July 9, 1966. The Oilers released him on August 7, 1967, and he did not play football in 1967 due to an infection. He signed with the Indianapolis Capitols of the Continental Football League (CFL) in June 1968, and was named to the CFL All-Central Division team and CFL All-Star second-team after the season. Hayes re-signed with the Capitols for the 1969 season on May 6, 1969. The Capitols won the CFL championship in 1969. The Capitols moved to the Atlantic Coast Football League for the 1970 season, and Hayes re-signed with the team again in June 1970. Hayes joined the Columbus Bucks of the Midwest Football League (MFL) in 1971, and won the championship with the team that season. He was also the defensive line coach for the Bucks. He stayed on with the team in 1972. The Bucks became the Columbus Barons for the 1973 season and Hayes was again a member of the team.
