= Youngstown Hardhats =

- Established: 1972
- Folded: 1981
- Based in: Youngstown, Ohio
- Home stadium: Struthers High School; South High School
- League: Midwest Football League (1972–1974, 1976); Mid-Atlantic Football League (1977–1981)

The Youngstown Hardhats were a semi-professional football team that played from 1972 to 1974 and 1976 to 1981. The team was based in Youngstown, Ohio, and competed in the Midwest Football League from 1972 to 1974 and 1976, and Mid-Atlantic Football League from 1977 to 1981.

== History ==
=== Midwest Football League ===
In January 1972, owner R. James Erskine announced George Rodak as the head coach for the Hardhats, a new franchise competing in the Midwest Football League. Darrell Dess was named an assistant coach in February 1972. Erskine said it would cost around $100,000 for the Hardhats to play their first season. They played their home games at Struthers High School in 1972, with renovations to the locker rooms and training facilities costing the team between $8,000 and $10,000 to perform. By April 1972, the Hardhats signed an agreement with the Cleveland Browns of the National Football League that the Browns would have first priority over other NFL teams in signing Hardhats players to contracts. The team held open tryouts in June 1972, with former Duke linebacker Dick Biddle in attendance. They played against the Washington Bears in an exhibition game on July 1, 1972, and against the Madison Mustangs of the Central States Football League on July 22. The Cleveland Browns of the National Football League sent six contracted players to the Hardhats for their August 5 game against the Lansing All Stars. After posting an 8–2 regular season record in 1972, the Hardhats were defeated in the league championship game by the Indiana Caps. The Hardhats lost $20,000 over the course of their inaugural season, and Rodak was fired as head coach in November 1972.

They went 8–2 again in 1973 under head coach Bill Shunkwiler. Al Boggia was named head coach of the Hardhats in May 1974. The team went 5–4 in 1974, finishing second in the Lakes Division.

The Hardhats posted a 38–6 record over three seasons. Despite this record, the Hardhats' owners announced in March 1975 that they would not field a team for the upcoming season, because of declining attendance and reports that a team from the World Football League would locate in Akron, Ohio. The Hardhats returned for the 1976 season, and posted another 8–2 record.

=== Mid-Atlantic Football League ===
Youngstown joined the Mid-Atlantic Football League in 1977, and, after, posting a 9–2 record in the regular season, lost in the championship game. They were considered the ninth-best semi-pro team in the country in 1977. They remained in the league for the 1978 season, competing in the South High School stadium in Youngstown and coached again by Boggia. During the 1979 season, the Hardhats were considered ninth in the country for minor league football teams. They played in the Mid-Atlantic Football League again in 1980 and 1981. The team folded during the 1981 season.

=== Season-by-season ===
Year	League	W	L	T	Finish	Coach
1972	Midwest Football League	8	2	0	2nd	George Rodak
1973	Midwest Football League	8	2	0	2nd	Bill Shunkwiler
1974	Midwest Football League	5	4	0	2nd (Lakes)	Al Boggia
No team in 1975
1976	Midwest Football League	8	2	0	2nd (Lakes)	Unknown
1977	Mid-Atlantic Football League	9	2	0	1st (Southern)	Unknown
1978	Mid-Atlantic Football League	Unknown				Al Boggia
1979	Mid-Atlantic Football League	Unknown				
1980	Mid-Atlantic Football League	Unknown				
1981	Mid-Atlantic Football League	Unknown				

== Notable players ==
- Dick Biddle
- Quentin Lowry
- Lou Piccone
- Allan Watson
