= Art Laster =

American football player (1948–1990)

No. 75, 63
- Position: Offensive tackle

Personal information
- Born: March 2, 1948; Gary, Indiana, U.S.
- Died: January 22, 1990 (aged 41); Hennepin County, Minnesota, U.S.
- Listed height: 6 ft 5 in (1.96 m)
- Listed weight: 280 lb (127 kg)

Career information
- High school: Tolletson (Gary, Indiana)
- College: Maryland State (1966–1969)
- NFL draft: 1970: 5th round, 128th overall pick

Career history
- Oakland Raiders (1970)*; Buffalo Bills (1970); Washington Redskins (1972)*; Indianapolis Capitols (1972); Ottawa Rough Riders (1972); Hartford Knights (1973); Toronto Northmen/Memphis Southmen (1974)*
- * Offseason or practice squad member only

Awards and highlights
- First-team ACFL (1973)
- Stats at Pro Football Reference

Arthur L. Laster (March 2, 1948 – January 22, 1990) was an American professional football offensive tackle who played one season with the Buffalo Bills of the National Football League (NFL). He played college football at Maryland State College and was selected by the Oakland Raiders in the fifth round of the 1970 NFL draft. He was also a member of the Washington Redskins of the NFL, the Indianapolis Capitols of the Midwest Football League, the Ottawa Rough Riders of the Canadian Football League (CFL), the Hartford Knights of the Atlantic Coast Football League (ACFL), and the Toronto Northmen/Memphis Southmen of the World Football League (WFL).

== Early life ==
Arthur L. Laster was born on March 2, 1948, in Gary, Indiana. He attended Tolletson High School in Gary. He participated in football, basketball, and track in high school. His discus throw of 60’8 ½” in 1966 set a regional track record. He was also runner-up in the state shot put title his senior year. He was named to the Chicago Tribune Northwestern Indiana High School Conference Football All Star Team in football his senior season.

== College career ==
Laster played college football at Maryland State College from 1966 to 1969 and was a four-year letterman. He was a starter at offensive guard during his freshman year in 1966, earning honorable mention All-Maryland Small College All Star honors. He earned the same honors the following season. He was moved to offensive tackle his junior year and garnered first-team Maryland College Division All-Star recognition during both his junior and senior years. Last also earned All-Central Intercollegiate Athletic Association and Pittsburgh Courier All-American honors while in college. He lettered in track and basketball (as a forward) at Maryland State as well. He did not play basketball his senior year. Laster was inducted into the Maryland Eastern Shore University Athletics Hall of Fame in 1984.

== Professional career ==
Laster was selected by the Oakland Raiders in the fifth round, with the 128th overall pick, of the 1970 NFL draft. He signed with the team in 1970 but was later waived on September 15, 1970.

Laster was claimed off waivers by the Buffalo Bills on September 16, 1970. He played in all 14 games, starting five, for the Bills during the 1970 season and returned two squib kicks for eight yards. He was released on August 31, 1971.

Laster signed with the Washington Redskins in 1972. He left the team during training camp. A week after leaving the Redskins, he signed with the Indianapolis Capitols of the Midwest Football League.

Laster was signed by the Ottawa Rough Riders of the Canadian Football League on October 20, 1972, and played in two games (both starts) for the team during the 1972 CFL season. He was waived on July 20, 1973.

He signed with the Hartford Knights of the Atlantic Coast Football League (ACFL) in early September 1973 and was a starter at tackle for the team during the 1973 season. He was named a first-team ACFL All-Star. The Knights and the ACFL both folded after the 1973 season.

Laster was signed by the Toronto Northmen of the World Football League in 1974. He was later waived after training camp.

== Personal life ==
Laster died on January 22, 1990, in Hennepin County, Minnesota due to a heart attack at the age of 41.
