= Clarke Hinkle =

American football player (1909–1988)

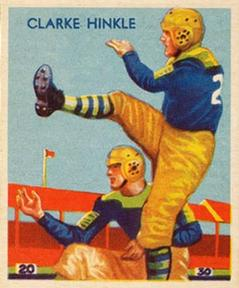
- 1935 trading card featuring Hinkle

No. 33, 30, 48, 41
- Positions: Fullback, linebacker

Personal information
- Born: April 10, 1909; Toronto, Ohio, U.S.
- Died: November 9, 1988 (aged 79); Steubenville, Ohio, U.S.
- Listed height: 5 ft 11 in (1.80 m)
- Listed weight: 202 lb (92 kg)

Career information
- High school: Toronto
- College: Bucknell (1929–1931)

Career history
- Green Bay Packers (1932–1941)

Awards and highlights
- 2× NFL champion (1936, 1939); 7× First-team All-Pro (1932, 1935–1938, 1940, 1941); 3× NFL All-Star (1938–1940); NFL rushing touchdowns co-leader (1937); NFL scoring leader (1938); NFL 1930s All-Decade Team; NFL 75th Anniversary All-Time Team; Green Bay Packers Hall of Fame; 2× Second-team All-American (1930, 1931); First-team All-Eastern (1931)

Career statistics
- Games played: 113
- Games started: 82
- Rushing yards: 3,860
- Rushing touchdowns: 35
- Receiving yards: 537
- Receiving touchdowns: 9
- Stats at Pro Football Reference
- Pro Football Hall of Fame
- College Football Hall of Fame

William Clarke Hinkle (April 10, 1909 – November 9, 1988) was an American professional football fullback and linebacker for the Green Bay Packers of the National Football League (NFL), also playing occasionally as a placekicker and punter. He was elected to the Pro Football Hall of Fame as part of its second class of inductees in 1964.

Known as one of the toughest players in the era of iron man football, Hinkle played for the Packers from 1932 to 1941 and held the all-time NFL records for rushing yardage and carries when his playing career ended. He led the NFL in touchdowns (seven) in 1937, in points scored (58) in 1938, and in field goals made and field goal percentage in both 1940 and 1941. He was selected as a first- or second-team All-Pro in each of his 10 NFL seasons and helped lead the Packers to three NFL championship games and NFL championships in 1936 and 1939. His playing career was cut short in 1942 by military service.

A native of Toronto, Ohio, Hinkle played college football for the Bucknell Bison from 1929 to 1931. He scored 50 points in a single game as a sophomore and led Bucknell to an undefeated season in 1931. He was inducted into the College Football Hall of Fame in 1971.

== Early life ==
William Clarke Hinkle was born in Toronto, Ohio, located on the Ohio River approximately 40 miles west of Pittsburgh, in 1909. He was the son of Charles Hinkle and Lillian Ault Clark, both Ohio natives. His father was an engineer and later a forger at a steel mill. Hinkle attended Toronto High School.

== College career ==
Hinkle played college football for Bucknell University, where he set several records for the Bucknell Bison football team as a fullback playing offense and defense. He scored eight touchdowns and scored 50 points in a game against Dickinson on Thanksgiving Day 1929. He finished the 1929 season with 21 touchdowns and 128 points scored. He had 37 touchdowns over his career at Bucknell from 1929 to 1931. In 1929, he led the East in scoring with 128 points. In 1931, he led the team to a 6–0–3 win–loss record. Hinkle's coach at Bucknell, Carl Snavely, called him: "Without a doubt, the greatest defensive back I have ever seen or coached."

Hinkle played for the East team in the East-West Shrine Game in San Francisco on New Year's Day 1932. He was the leading ground gainer in the game, and a United Press correspondent wrote: "If there was a single star in the long drawn battle of line plunges and punting it was Clark [sic] Hinkle of Bucknell whose stabs through tackle were a revelation in driving power."

While at Bucknell University he became a member of the Sigma Alpha Epsilon fraternity.

== Professional career ==
In January 1932, after watching Hinkle play in the Shrine Game, Curly Lambeau signed Hinkle to play professional football for the Green Bay Packers. At the time, the Packers were the best team in the NFL, having won three consecutive NFL championships from 1929 to 1931. Hinkle played for the Packers for his entire ten-year NFL career, was selected as a first- or second-team All-Pro every year, and helped lead the Packers to NFL championships in 1936 and 1939.

Hinkle was featured on the cover of the first NFL record manual in 1941.

As a rookie in 1932, Hinkle appeared in 13 games and led the Packers with 331 rushing yards on 95 carries. He quickly developed a reputation not only for his two-way play on both offense and defense, but also as the best punter in the NFL. The 1932 Packers finished second in the NFL with a 10–3–1 record, and Hinkle was selected as a first-team All-Pro in 1932 by Collyer's Eye magazine and as the second-team fullback (behind Bronko Nagurski) on the United Press (UP) and NFL All-Pro teams. He was hailed by Curly Lambeau at the end of the 1932 season as a second Jim Thorpe, and by some critics as "the greatest football player in the world today."

After spending the off-season working for a steel construction firm in his home town of Toronto, Ohio, Hinkle returned to Green Bay in September 1933. In his second NFL season, Hinkle again led the team with 413 rushing yards, but the Packers' record fell to 5–7–1, the only losing season suffered by the Packers in their first 25 years in the NFL. Despite the team's poor showing, Hinkle was selected as a second-team All-Pro by the UP, Chicago Daily News, and Green Bay Press-Gazette.

Hinkle presented a rare combination of power, speed, and accurate kicking. In 1937, he led the NFL with seven touchdowns and ranked second with 552 rushing yards. In 1938, he led the NFL in scoring with 58 points scored on seven touchdowns, seven extra points, and three field goals. He led the NFL in field goals and field goal percentage in both 1940 and 1941. He also continued to excel as a punter, ranking second in the NFL in punting yards in 1939 and averaging 44.5 yards per punt in 1941.

Hinkle's playing career was cut short after the 1941 season by wartime military service. He began his NFL career in 1932 at a salary of $5,000 and had his salary cut during the Great Depression, then restored to $5,000 in the late 1930s. He held out for and received $10,000 in his final season. He finished his career with 3,860 rushing yards, 537 receiving yards, 316 passing yards, and 379 points scored on 44 touchdowns, 28 field goals, and 31 extra points.

== Reputation for toughness ==
Hinkle loved the intense physicality of football. According to one account, "Clark Hinkle loved contact. It didn't matter which side of the ball he was coming from, Hinkle loved delivering blows." Ken Strong, another Hall of Fame back of the era, remembered the force of Hinkle's tackles: "When he hit you, you knew you were hit. Bells rang and you felt it all the way to your toes." Another back, Johnny Sisk, said: "No one in the whole league ever bruised me more than Hinkle did. . . . Hinkle had a lot of leg action. I broke my shoulder twice tackling Mr. Hinkle."

Hinkle's competition with Chicago Bears fullback Bronko Nagurski was especially memorable. Hinkle was the only player to knock Nagurski out of a game, and according to the Pro Football Hall of Fame, Hinkle's "creed was 'get to the Bronk before he gets to me.'" Hinkle cited a 1934 collision with Nagurski as his greatest day in football. He recalled: "I was carrying the ball and Nagurski charged in to make the tackle. WHAM! We banged into each other. Nagurski had to be removed from the game with a broken nose and two closed eyes. Strangely enough, I suffered no ill effects and was able to continue playing." Nagurski later called Hinkle the "toughest man I ever played against." In the book, "Pain Gang: Pro Football's Fifty Toughest Players", Neil Reynolds included both Hinkle and Nagurski on his list of the toughest players in the history of the game.

Hinkle's toughness remained to the end. On November 2, 1941, in his final game against the Chicago Bears, Hinkle had his leg torn open by an opponent's spike but returned late in the game to kick a game-winning field goal from the 44-yard line.

== Honors and records ==
When Hinkle's playing career ended, he held NFL career records with 3,860 rushing yards and 1,171 carries. He surpassed the old record of 3,511 rushing yards held by Cliff Battles. Hinkle's rushing yardage record stood until 1949 when it was broken by Steve Van Buren.

Hinkle received multiple honors and awards arising out of his accomplishments as a football player, including the following:

- In 1950, he was one of the 25 inaugural inductees into the Helms Athletic Foundation's professional football hall of fame.
- In 1957, he was selected as the fullback on the All-Time Packer Team.
- In 1964, he was elected to the Pro Football Hall of Fame as part of its second induction class.
- In 1969, he was named to the NFL 1930s All-Decade Team.
- In 1971, he was inducted into the College Football Hall of Fame.
- In 1972, he was inducted into the Green Bay Packers Hall of Fame.
- In 1979, he was inducted into the Bucknell Hall of Fame.
- In 1985, Toronto High School named its "Clarke Hinkle Stadium" in his honor.
- In 1994, he was named to the NFL's 75th Anniversary All-Time Two Way Team.
- In 1997, the Packers' west practice field across Oneida Street from Lambeau Field was dedicated as "Clarke Hinkle Field".
- In 2013, a bronze tribute statue to Clarke Hinkle was unveiled on the Packers Heritage Trail in Green Bay. Sculptor Gary Tillery created the work.

== Family, military service, and later years ==
Hinkle's older brother Gordie Hinkle played minor league baseball as a catcher from 1930 to 1941 and for the Boston Red Sox in 1934.

In December 1936, Hinkle was married in New York to Emilie Cobden. His marriage ended immediately after World War II owing to difficulty readjusting to civilian life, causing Hinkle to, in his own words "get off the beam a little bit" and go "a little haywire." After his divorce, Hinkle married again, but the union lasted only 33 days.

In May 1942, following the United States entry into World War II, Hinkle enlisted in the United States Coast Guard and received the rank of lieutenant. In the fall of 1942, he served as an assistant football coach at the United States Coast Guard Academy in New London, Connecticut. He also played five games for New London's professional Electric Boat Diesel football team. He later served on convoy duty in the North African Campaign and as an air-sea rescuer off Newfoundland.

Hinkle was discharged from the Coast Guard in 1946 and began working for Kimberly-Clark in Neenah, Wisconsin. He later lived in Steubenville, Ohio, working as a sales representative for an industrial supply company. He also worked in the late 1960s as a sports desk anchor for an Ohio television station. He was the head coach for the Toronto Tigers, a semi-professional football team, in 1962. He died in Steubenville in 1988 at age 79 following a long illness. He was buried at Toronto Union Cemetery in Toronto, Ohio.
