= Pete Mikolajewski =

American football player (born 1943)

No. 10, 15
- Position: Quarterback

Personal information
- Born: June 26, 1943 (age 83); Portsmouth, Virginia, U.S.
- Listed height: 6 ft 1 in (1.85 m)
- Listed weight: 210 lb (95 kg)

Career information
- High school: Catholic (Piqua, Ohio)
- College: Kent State

Career history
- Dayton Colts (1966); Detroit Lions (1966); Akron Vulcans (1967); Dayton Colts (1967–1968); San Diego Chargers (1969)

Awards and highlights
- MFL MVP (1966)
- Stats at Pro Football Reference

Peter James Mikolajewski (born February 26, 1943) is an American former professional football quarterback who played one season with the San Diego Chargers of the American Football League (AFL). He played college football at Kent State University.

== Early life and college ==
Peter James Mikolajewski was born on February 26, 1943, in Portsmouth, Virginia. He attended Piqua Catholic School in Piqua, Ohio.

Mikolajewski played college football for the Kent State Golden Flashes of Kent State University.

== Professional career ==
Mikolajewski played for the Dayton Colts of the Midwest Football League (MFL) in 1966 and was named MFL MVP after setting league records with 123 completions, 1,842 yards, and 23 touchdowns.

In November 1966, Mikolajewski signed with the Detroit Lions of the National Football League after an injury to Milt Plum. In 1967, he played in one game for the Lions' farm team, the Akron Vulcans of the Continental Football League (COFL).

Mikolajewski returned to the Colts in 1967 and was the league's leading passer that year. He also played for the Colts in 1968. As of October 11, 1968, it was reported that he had completed 98 of 183 passes for 1,707 yards and 19 touchdowns that season.

Mikolajewski was signed by the San Diego Chargers of the American Football League in 1969. He appeared in one game for the Chargers during the 1969 season but did not record any statistics other than being sacked once for ten yards and fumbling. He was released in 1970.
