= Bob Ferguson (fullback) =

American football player (1939–2014)

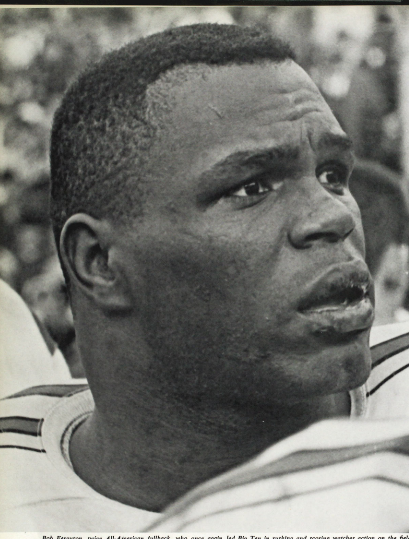
- Ferguson in 1961

No. 46, 35
- Position: Fullback

Personal information
- Born: August 29, 1939; Troy, Ohio, U.S.
- Died: December 30, 2004 (aged 65); Columbus, Ohio, U.S.
- Listed height: 5 ft 11 in (1.80 m)
- Listed weight: 220 lb (100 kg)

Career information
- High school: Troy
- College: Ohio State (1959–1961)
- NFL draft: 1961: 1st round, 5th overall pick
- AFL draft: 1961: 1st round, 8th overall pick

Career history
- Pittsburgh Steelers (1962–1963); Minnesota Vikings (1963); Dayton Colts (1965)

Awards and highlights
- National champion (1961); Maxwell Award (1961); UPI Player of the Year (1961); SN Player of the Year (1961); 2× Unanimous All-American (1960, 1961); 2× First-team All-Big Ten (1960, 1961)

Career NFL statistics
- Rushing yards: 209
- Rushing average: 3.2
- Rushing touchdowns: 1
- Receptions: 4
- Receiving yards: 13
- Stats at Pro Football Reference
- College Football Hall of Fame

Robert Eugene Ferguson (August 29, 1939 – December 30, 2004) was an American professional football fullback who played in the National Football League (NFL) with the Pittsburgh Steelers and Minnesota Vikings. He played college football for the Ohio State Buckeyes, where he won the Maxwell Award in 1961. He was inducted into the College Football Hall of Fame in 1996.

== Playing career ==
Ferguson attended Troy High School in Troy, Ohio. Ferguson's first year of eligibility at Ohio State University was 1959. The starting fullback at the beginning of the season was the senior, and Heisman Trophy candidate, Bob White. Through the course of the season, however, Ferguson supplanted White as the starter and led the team in rushing that season, averaging 6.1 yards per carry.

Over the next two seasons, Ferguson continued to lead the Ohio State offensive attack. In both 1960 and 1961 Ferguson was a unanimous All-American selection. In 1961, he won the UPI College Football Player of the Year, the Maxwell Award, and was the runner-up to Ernie Davis for the Heisman Trophy. The 1961 Heisman vote was the second-closest in the history of the award, with Davis edging Ferguson by 53 points.

Ferguson shared the Ohio State backfield in 1961 with halfbacks Paul Warfield and Matt Snell. Ferguson was a power runner and Warfield was supplied speed. The common description of the time said, "Warfield is the lightning, Ferguson is the thunder." The Buckeyes won the Big Ten Conference that year and were voted national champions by the Football Writers Association of America (FWAA).

Ferguson finished his career at Ohio State with 2,162 rushing yards. This rushing total was at the time second in team history behind Howard Cassady. Ferguson owns the distinction of never having been thrown for a loss during his college football career. Ferguson was inducted into the College Football Hall of Fame in 1996, and into Ohio State's own Varsity O Hall of Fame in 1987. He was selected to the Ohio State Football All-Century Team in 2000.

Ferguson was a first-round draft pick by both the Pittsburgh Steelers of the National Football League and the San Diego Chargers of the American Football League. Ferguson accepted the offer from the Steelers, but a head injury hampered his football career. After two seasons, playing both for the Steelers and the Minnesota Vikings, he joined the Dayton Colts of the Midwest Football League in 1965.

== Later life ==
Ferguson returned to Ohio State University and earned a master's degree in sociology. He worked as a youth counselor in Columbus, Ohio until he was forced to retire in 1990 due to health problems. Ferguson died in 2004 of complications due to diabetes.
