= 1999 Holy Cross Crusaders football team =

American college football season

1999 Holy Cross Crusaders football
- Conference: Patriot League
- Record: 3–8 (2–4 Patriot)
- Head coach: Dan Allen (4th season)
- Captains: John Aloisi; David Puloka; Joe Saunders
- Home stadium: Fitton Field

1999 Patriot League football standings
	Conf.			Overall
Team	W		L	W		L
No. 14 Lehigh +^	5	–	1	10	–	2
No. 18 Colgate +^	5	–	1	10	–	2
Towson	4	–	2	7	–	4
Bucknell	3	–	3	7	–	4
Lafayette	2	–	4	4	–	7
Holy Cross	2	–	4	3	–	8
Fordham	0	–	6	0	–	11
+ – Conference co-champions; ^ – NCAA Division I-AA playoff participant; Rankings from The Sports Network poll

The 1999 Holy Cross Crusaders football team was an American football team that represented the College of the Holy Cross during the 1999 NCAA Division I-AA football season. Holy Cross tied for second-to-last in the Patriot League.

In their fourth year under head coach Dan Allen, the Crusaders compiled a 3–8 record. John Aloisi, David Puloka and Joe Saunders were the team captains.

The Crusaders were outscored 323 to 219. Holy Cross' 2–4 conference record tied for fifth in the seven-team Patriot League standings.

Holy Cross played its home games at Fitton Field on the college campus in Worcester, Massachusetts.

== Schedule ==
Date	Opponent	Site	Result	Attendance	Source
September 11	Georgetown*	Fitton Field; Worcester, MA	L 16–34	5,170	
September 18	Lafayette	Fitton Field; Worcester, MA	W 30–12	4,170	
September 25	Harvard^{†}^*	Fitton Field; Worcester, MA	L 17–25	11,248	
October 2	at Towson	Minnegan Stadium; Towson, MD	L 0–14	3,802	
October 9	Yale*	Fitton Field; Worcester, MA	L 14–34	4,276	
October 16	Fairfield*	Fitton Field; Worcester, MA	W 24–23	3,711	
October 23	at No. 8 Lehigh	Goodman Stadium; Bethlehem, PA	L 8–62	13,181	
October 30	at Saint Mary's (CA)*	Saint Mary's Stadium; Moraga, CA	L 26–28	2,742	
November 6	at Bucknell	Christy Mathewson–Memorial Stadium; Lewisburg, PA	L 21–32	1,137	
November 13	at Fordham	Coffey Field; Bronx, NY (rivalry)	W 37–14	2,947	
November 20	Colgate	Fitton Field; Worcester, MA	L 26–45	5,341	
*Non-conference game; ^{†}Homecoming; ^ Family Weekend; Rankings from The Sports Network Poll released prior to the game

== Roster ==
1999 Holy Cross Crusaders football team roster
Players			Coaches
Offense: Pos. / # / Name / Class	Defense: Pos. / # / Name / Class; LB / 57 / Ben Berger / Sr	Special teams: Pos. / # / Name / Class	Head coach: Dan Allen; Coordinators/assistant coaches Legend: (C) Team captain; (S) Suspended; (I) Ineligible; Injured; Redshirt
