= Toronto City School District =

School district in Ohio, United States

Address
- 1307 Dennis Way Toronto, Ohio, 43821; United States
- Coordinates: 40°27′44″N 80°36′16″W

District information
- Type: Public
- Grades: PreK–12
- Superintendent: Maureen R. Taggart
- School board: Toronto City Schools Board of Education
- Schools: 3
- NCES District ID: 3904491

Students and staff
- Enrollment: 838 (2024–2025)
- Teachers: 53.55 (on an FTE basis) (2024–2026)
- Staff: 84.00 (on an FTE basis) (2024–2025)
- Student–teacher ratio: 15.65 (2024–2025)

Other information
- Website: www.torontocsd.org

The Toronto City School District is a public school district based in Toronto, Ohio, United States.

== Schools ==
Current School Name	Original Name (if changed)	Year built	Current Grades Housed	Additional Info (Additions made, Architect, Current Status, Etc.)
Toronto Junior/Senior High School		2013	K-12	Elementary students have been moved here, effective 2020. The elementary side is separated from the main building, close to the Library.
Karaffa Elementary	J.T. Karaffa Middle School (1985-2011) Toronto Middle School (1982-1985)	1982	PreK	School building has been sold meaning K-5th grades have been moved to Toronto High School.

== See also ==
- List of school districts in Ohio
