= 1999 Columbia Lions football team =

American college football season

1999 Columbia Lions football
- Conference: Ivy League
- Record: 3–7 (1–6 Ivy)
- Head coach: Ray Tellier (11th season)
- Captains: Jason Bivens; Justin Meadlin; Matt Radley; Jon Sproul
- Home stadium: Wien Stadium

1999 Ivy League football standings
	Conf.			Overall
Team	W		L	W		L
No. 25 Brown +	6	–	1	9	–	1
Yale +	6	–	1	9	–	1
Cornell	5	–	2	7	–	3
Penn	4	–	3	5	–	5
Harvard	3	–	4	5	–	5
Dartmouth	2	–	5	2	–	8
Columbia	1	–	6	3	–	7
Princeton	1	–	6	3	–	7
+ – Conference co-champions; Rankings from The Sports Network poll

The 1999 Columbia Lions football team was an American football team that represented Columbia University during the 1999 NCAA Division I-AA football season. Columbia tied for last in the Ivy League.

In their 11th season under head coach Ray Tellier, the Lions compiled a 3–7 record and were outscored 301 to 175. Jason Bivens, Justin Meadlin, Matt Radley and Jon Sproul were the team captains.

The Lions' 1–6 conference record tied for seventh in the Ivy League standings. Columbia was outscored 141 to 95 by Ivy opponents.

Columbia played its homes games at Lawrence A. Wien Stadium in Upper Manhattan, in New York City.

== Schedule ==
Date	Opponent	Site	Result	Attendance	Source
September 18	at Harvard	Harvard Stadium; Boston, MA	L 7–24	7,912	
September 25	Towson*	Wien Stadium; New York, NY	W 28–13	2,325	
October 2	at No. 12 Lehigh*	Goodman Stadium; Bethlehem, PA	L 13–63	10,829	
October 9	Bucknell*	Wien Stadium; New York, NY	W 10–7	2,883	
October 16	Penn^{†}	Wien Stadium; New York, NY	L 17–41	7,702	
October 23	Yale	Wien Stadium; New York, NY	L 29–41	2,750	
October 30	at Princeton	Princeton Stadium; Princeton, NJ	L 15–44	13,164	
November 6	Dartmouth	Wien Stadium; New York, NY	W 21–14	4,310	
November 13	at Cornell	Schoellkopf Field; Ithaca, NY (rivalry)	L 29–31	5,870	
November 20	at Brown	Brown Stadium; Providence, RI	L 6–23	12,076	
*Non-conference game; ^{†}Homecoming; Rankings from The Sports Network Poll released prior to the game
