= 1999 Cornell Big Red football team =

American college football season

1999 Cornell Big Red football
- Conference: Ivy League
- Record: 7–3 (5–2 Ivy)
- Head coach: Pete Mangurian (2nd season)
- Defensive coordinator: Greg Gigantino (2nd season)
- Captains: Nate Fischer; Deon Harris
- Home stadium: Schoellkopf Field

1999 Ivy League football standings
	Conf.			Overall
Team	W		L	W		L
No. 25 Brown +	6	–	1	9	–	1
Yale +	6	–	1	9	–	1
Cornell	5	–	2	7	–	3
Penn	4	–	3	5	–	5
Harvard	3	–	4	5	–	5
Dartmouth	2	–	5	2	–	8
Columbia	1	–	6	3	–	7
Princeton	1	–	6	3	–	7
+ – Conference co-champions; Rankings from The Sports Network poll

The 1999 Cornell Big Red football team was an American football team that represented Cornell University during the 1999 NCAA Division I-AA football season. Cornell finished third in the Ivy League.

In its second season under head coach Pete Mangurian, the team compiled a 7–3 record and outscored opponents 254 to 235. Nate Fischer and Deon Harris were the team captains.

The Big Red's 5–2 conference record placed third in the Ivy League standings. Cornell outscored Ivy opponents, 165 to 152.

Cornell played its home games at Schoellkopf Field in Ithaca, New York.

== Schedule ==
Date	Opponent	Site	Result	Attendance	Source
September 18	at Princeton	Princeton Stadium; Princeton, NJ	W 20–3	15,288	
September 25	Fordham*	Schoellkopf Field; Ithaca, NY	W 42–14	11,697	
October 2	at Brown	Brown Stadium; Providence, RI	W 33–28	13,260	
October 9	Harvard	Schoellkopf Field; Ithaca, NY	W 24–23	9,218	
October 16	at Colgate*	Andy Kerr Stadium; Hamilton, NY (rivalry)	L 16–55	8,155	
October 23	at Dartmouth	Memorial Field; Hanover, NH (rivalry)	L 17–20	8,023	
October 30	Wagner*	Schoellkopf Field; Ithaca, NY	W 31–14	8,124	
November 6	Yale	Schoellkopf Field; Ithaca, NY	L 20–37	16,071	
November 13	Columbia	Schoellkopf Field; Ithaca, NY (rivalry)	W 31–29	5,870	
November 20	at Penn	Franklin Field; Philadelphia, PA (rivalry)	W 20–12	6,928	
*Non-conference game
