= Dick Biddle =

American football player and coach (born 1947)

Biographical details
- Born: November 26, 1947; Parkersburg, West Virginia, U.S.
- Died: August 11, 2023 (aged 75); Cary, North Carolina, U.S.
- Education: Duke University

Playing career
- 1967–1970: Duke
- 1972: Youngstown Hardhats
- Position: Linebacker

Coaching career (HC unless noted)
- 1971: West Virginia (GA)
- 1973–1976: Allegheny (assistant)
- 1977–1982: Colgate (assistant)
- 1983–1984: Virginia Tech (assistant)
- 1985–1989: Minnesota (assistant)
- 1990–1991: Navy (assistant)
- 1992–1995: Colgate (assistant)
- 1996–2013: Colgate

Head coaching record
- Overall: 137–73
- Tournaments: 3–7 (NCAA D-I-AA/FCS playoffs)

Accomplishments and honors

Championships
- 7 Patriot League (1997, 1999, 2002, 2003, 2005, 2008, 2012)

Awards
- AFCA NCAA Division I-AA COY (2003); 4× Patriot League Coach of the Year (1996, 2003, 2005, 2008); 2× First-team All-ACC (1968, 1970)

Richard L. Biddle (November 26, 1947 – August 11, 2023) was an American football player and coach. He served as head football coach at Colgate University from 1996 through 2013, compiling a record of 137–73. This ranks him first at Colgate in terms of total wins and he has achieved the best winning percentage of any Colgate coach with seven or more years at the helm of the Raiders.

== Playing career ==
Biddle played high school football at Parkersburg High School in Parkersburg, West Virginia.

Biddle was an all-Atlantic Coast Conference linebacker for two seasons at Duke. The former Blue Devil co-captain received third team Associated Press All-America honors in his senior year and was a participant in the Blue-Gray and Hula Bowl games. Biddle was a three-time winner of Duke's Hatchet Award, given to the most valuable player on defense. In his senior year he also received the Blue Devil Club Award as the senior who contributed the most to the team. He is a member of the All-Century Team at Duke.

After going undrafted in the 1971 NFL draft, Biddle signed with the Montreal Alouettes of the Canadian Football League (CFL) on May 3, 1971. He was released before the start of the regular season on June 23, 1971. Biddle signed with the Youngstown Hardhats of the Midwest Football League in 1972. He broke his leg in the eleventh game of the season, and missed the rest of the year.

== Coaching career ==
Biddle worked as a graduate assistant for West Virginia in 1971 after his release from the Alouettes.

Biddle is the first Colgate coach to ever record nine straight seasons with seven or more victories. In 2012, he led the Raiders to the Patriot League title and the NCAA FCS Playoffs (first round loss to Wagner). Overall, he led Colgate to seven Patriot League Championships (1997, 1999, 2002, 2003, 2005, 2008, and 2012).

Biddle retired after the 2013 season and was succeeded by Dan Hunt.

== Head coaching record ==
Year	Team	Overall	Conference	Standing	Bowl/playoffs	TSN^{#}	Coaches^{°}
Colgate Red Raiders / Raiders (Patriot League) (1996–2013)
1996	Colgate	6–5	3–2	T–2nd			
1997	Colgate	7–5	6–0	1st	L NCAA Division I-AA First Round	25	21
1998	Colgate	8–4	5–1	2nd	L NCAA Division I-AA First Round		21
1999	Colgate	10–2	5–1	T–1st	L NCAA Division I-AA First Round	18	18
2000	Colgate	7–4	4–2	T–2nd			
2001	Colgate	7–3	5–1	2nd			
2002	Colgate	9–3	6–1	T–1st		25	25
2003	Colgate	15–1	7–0	1st	L NCAA Division I-AA Championship	2	2
2004	Colgate	7–4	4–2	T–3rd			
2005	Colgate	8–4	5–1	T–1st	L NCAA Division I-AA First Round	23	22
2006	Colgate	4–7	3–3	T–4th			
2007	Colgate	7–4	4–2	T–2nd			
2008	Colgate	9–3	5–0	1st	L NCAA Division I First Round	16	
2009	Colgate	9–2	4–2	T–2nd		20	
2010	Colgate	7–4	3–2	T–2nd			
2011	Colgate	5–6	1–4	T–5th			
2012	Colgate	8–4	5–0	1st	L NCAA Division I First Round	25	
2013	Colgate	4–8	3–2	T–2nd			
Colgate:		137–73	78–26				
Total:		137–73					
National championship Conference title Conference division title or championship game berth
