= 1999 Harvard Crimson football team =

American college football season

1999 Harvard Crimson football
- Conference: Ivy League
- Record: 5–5 (3–4 Ivy)
- Head coach: Tim Murphy (6th season)
- Co-offensive coordinators: Jay Mills (4th season); Bob Stitt (1st season)
- Offensive scheme: West Coast
- Home stadium: Harvard Stadium

1999 Ivy League football standings
	Conf.			Overall
Team	W		L	W		L
No. 25 Brown +	6	–	1	9	–	1
Yale +	6	–	1	9	–	1
Cornell	5	–	2	7	–	3
Penn	4	–	3	5	–	5
Harvard	3	–	4	5	–	5
Dartmouth	2	–	5	2	–	8
Columbia	1	–	6	3	–	7
Princeton	1	–	6	3	–	7
+ – Conference co-champions; Rankings from The Sports Network poll

The 1999 Harvard Crimson football team represented Harvard University in the 1999 NCAA Division I-AA football season. Harvard compiled a 5–5 record (3–4 conference record) and finished fifth in the Ivy League.

== Schedule ==
Date	Opponent	Site	Result	Attendance	Source
September 18	Columbia	Harvard Stadium; Boston, MA	W 24–7	7,912	
September 25	at Holy Cross*	Fitton Field; Worcester, MA	W 25–17	11,248	
October 2	Colgate*	Harvard Stadium; Boston, MA	L 21–24	7,468	
October 9	at Cornell	Schoellkopf Field; Ithaca, NY	L 23–24	9,218	
October 16	at Fordham*	Coffey Field; Bronx, NY	W 37–30	4,172	
October 23	Princeton	Harvard Stadium; Boston, MA (rivalry)	W 13–6	8,174	
October 30	Dartmouth	Harvard Stadium; Boston, MA (rivalry)	W 63–21	13,706	
November 6	at Brown	Brown Stadium; Providence, RI	L 10–17	13,371	
November 13	Penn	Harvard Stadium; Boston, MA (rivalry)	L 17–21	6,990	
November 20	at Yale	Yale Bowl; New Haven, CT (The Game)	L 21–24	52,484	
*Non-conference game
