= 1999 Lehigh Mountain Hawks football team =

American college football season

1999 Lehigh Mountain Hawks football

Patriot League co-champion

NCAA Division I-AA First Round, L 12–27 at Hofstra
- Conference: Patriot League

Ranking
- Sports Network: No. 14
- Record: 10–2 (5–1 Patriot)
- Head coach: Kevin Higgins (6th season)
- Offensive coordinator: Andy Coen (4th season)
- Defensive coordinator: Joe Bottiglieri (2nd season)
- Captains: Ian Eason; Kevin Joseph; Brett Snyder; Phil Stambaugh
- Home stadium: Goodman Stadium

1999 Patriot League football standings
	Conf.			Overall
Team	W		L	W		L
No. 14 Lehigh +^	5	–	1	10	–	2
No. 18 Colgate +^	5	–	1	10	–	2
Towson	4	–	2	7	–	4
Bucknell	3	–	3	7	–	4
Lafayette	2	–	4	4	–	7
Holy Cross	2	–	4	3	–	8
Fordham	0	–	6	0	–	11
+ – Conference co-champions; ^ – NCAA Division I-AA playoff participant; Rankings from The Sports Network poll

The 1999 Lehigh Mountain Hawks football team was an American football team that represented Lehigh University during the 1999 NCAA Division I-AA football season. Lehigh was co-champion of the Patriot League, but lost in the first round of the Division I-AA national playoffs.

In their sixth year under head coach Kevin Higgins, the Mountain Hawks compiled a 10–2 record. Ian Eason, Kevin Joseph, Brett Snyder and Phil Stambaugh were the team captains.

The Mountain Hawks outscored opponents 478 to 220. Lehigh's 5–1 conference record tied for best in the seven-team Patriot League standings. The co-championship represented Lehigh's first back-to-back Patriot title, and its fourth first-place finish of the 1990s.

The Mountain Hawks were ranked No. 19 in the preseason Division I-AA national poll, and remained ranked throughout the year, rising as high as No. 7 and finishing the year at No. 14. Though co-champion Colgate was given the Patriot League's automatic berth in the Division I-AA playoffs, Lehigh earned an at-large berth. Both Patriot League playoff teams lost in the first round.

Lehigh played its home games at Goodman Stadium on the university's Goodman Campus in Bethlehem, Pennsylvania.

== Schedule ==
Date	Opponent	Rank	Site	Result	Attendance	Source
September 11	at Fordham*	No. 20	Coffey Field; Bronx, NY	W 49–7	4,177	
September 18	Monmouth*	No. 17	Goodman Stadium; Bethlehem, PA	W 56–10	10,477	
September 25	at Princeton*	No. 15	Princeton Stadium; Princeton, NJ	W 31–0	20,941	
October 2	Columbia*	No. 12	Goodman Stadium; Bethlehem, PA	W 63–13	10,829	
October 9	at Dartmouth*	No. 10	Memorial Field; Hanover, NH	W 30–14	6,109	
October 16	at No. 11 Delaware*	No. 9	Delaware Stadium; Newark, DE (rivalry)	W 42–35	22,032	
October 23	Holy Cross	No. 8	Goodman Stadium; Bethlehem, PA	W 62–8	13,181	
October 30	Towson	No. 7	Goodman Stadium; Bethlehem, PA	W 44–39	10,789	
November 6	at Colgate	No. 9	Andy Kerr Stadium; Hamilton, NY	L 24–28	6,228	
November 13	at Bucknell	No. 16	Christy Mathewson–Memorial Stadium; Lewisburg, PA	W 48–27	3,849	
November 20	Lafayette	No. 14	Goodman Stadium; Bethlehem, PA (The Rivalry)	W 14–12	16,000	
November 27	at No. 5 Hofstra*	No. 14	Hofstra Stadium; Hempstead, NY (NCAA Division I-AA First Round)	L 12–27	6,770	
*Non-conference game; Rankings from The Sports Network Poll released prior to the game
