= 1999 Towson Tigers football team =

American college football season

1999 Towson Tigers football
- Conference: Patriot League
- Record: 7–4 (4–2 Patriot)
- Head coach: Gordy Combs (8th season)
- Home stadium: Minnegan Stadium

1999 Patriot League football standings
	Conf.			Overall
Team	W		L	W		L
No. 14 Lehigh +^	5	–	1	10	–	2
No. 18 Colgate +^	5	–	1	10	–	2
Towson	4	–	2	7	–	4
Bucknell	3	–	3	7	–	4
Lafayette	2	–	4	4	–	7
Holy Cross	2	–	4	3	–	8
Fordham	0	–	6	0	–	11
+ – Conference co-champions; ^ – NCAA Division I-AA playoff participant; Rankings from The Sports Network poll

The 1999 Towson Tigers football team was an American football team that represented Towson University during the 1999 NCAA Division I-AA football season. Towson finished third in the Patriot League.

In their eighth year under head coach Gordy Combs, the Tigers compiled a 7–4 record.

The Tigers outscored opponents 302 to 255. Their 4–2 conference record placed third in the seven-team Patriot League standings.

Towson played its home games at Minnegan Stadium on the university campus in Towson, Maryland.

== Schedule ==
Date	Opponent	Site	Result	Attendance	Source
September 4	Monmouth*	Minnegan Stadium; Towson, MD	W 34–7	2,359	
September 11	Lafayette	Minnegan Stadium; Towson, MD	W 35–7	2,481	
September 18	at Bucknell	Christy Mathewson–Memorial Stadium; Lewisburg, PA	W 27–20	2,921	
September 25	at Columbia*	Wien Stadium; New York, NY	L 13–28	2,325	
October 2	Holy Cross	Minnegan Stadium; Towson, MD	W 14–0	3,802	
October 9	vs. Morgan State*	Homewood Field; Baltimore, MD (rivalry)	L 22–28		
October 16	at Howard*	William H. Greene Stadium; Washington, DC	W 49–33	1,835	
October 23	Fordham	Minnegan Stadium; Towson, MD	W 25–23	4,031	
October 30	at No. 7 Lehigh	Goodman Stadium; Bethlehem, PA	L 39–44	10,789	
November 6	Dayton*	Minnegan Stadium; Towson, MD	W 30–27	3,038	
November 13	at Colgate	Andy Kerr Stadium; Hamilton, NY	L 14–38	4,224	
*Non-conference game; Rankings from The Sports Network Poll released prior to the game
