= 1999 Brown Bears football team =

American college football season

1999 Brown Bears football

Ivy League co-champion
- Conference: Ivy League

Ranking
- Sports Network: No. 25
- Record: 9–1 (6–1 Ivy)
- Head coach: Phil Estes (2nd season)
- Offensive scheme: Pro-style
- Defensive coordinator: David Duggan (2nd season)
- Base defense: 4–3
- Captains: James Perry; A. Smith; Jason Wargin
- Home stadium: Brown Stadium

1999 Ivy League football standings
	Conf.			Overall
Team	W		L	W		L
No. 25 Brown +	6	–	1	9	–	1
Yale +	6	–	1	9	–	1
Cornell	5	–	2	7	–	3
Penn	4	–	3	5	–	5
Harvard	3	–	4	5	–	5
Dartmouth	2	–	5	2	–	8
Columbia	1	–	6	3	–	7
Princeton	1	–	6	3	–	7
+ – Conference co-champions; Rankings from The Sports Network poll

The 1999 Brown Bears football team was an American football team that represented Brown University during the 1999 NCAA Division I-AA football season. Brown was co-champion of the Ivy League.

In their second season under head coach Phil Estes, the Bears compiled a 9–1 record and outscored opponents 324 to 239. James Perry, Jason Wargin and A. Smith were the team captains.

The Bears' 6–1 conference record tied for first place in the Ivy League standings. They outscored Ivy opponents 225 to 168. Brown's wins included a defeat of 1999's Ivy co-champion, Yale. It was Brown's first share of an Ivy title since 1976.

Unranked throughout the year, Brown was finally recognized in the national Division I-AA poll after its final game of the season, ranked at No. 25.

Brown played its home games at Brown Stadium in Providence, Rhode Island.

== Schedule ==
Date	Opponent	Site	Result	Attendance	Source
September 18	at Yale	Yale Bowl; New Haven, CT	W 25–24	17,398	
September 25	Lafayette*	Brown Stadium; Providence, RI	W 35–28	5,448	
October 2	Cornell	Brown Stadium; Providence, RI	L 28–33	13,260	
October 9	Princeton	Brown Stadium; Providence, RI	W 53–30	5,122	
October 16	Rhode Island*	Brown Stadium; Providence, RI (rivalry)	W 27–25	7,032	
October 23	at Penn	Franklin Field; Philadelphia, PA	W 44–37	13,116	
October 30	at Fordham*	Coffey Field; Bronx, NY	W 37–18		
November 6	Harvard	Brown Stadium; Providence, RI	W 17–10	13,371	
November 13	at Dartmouth	Memorial Field; Hanover, NH	W 35–28	6,113	
November 20	Columbia	Brown Stadium; Providence, RI	W 23–6	12,076	
*Non-conference game
