= 1999 Princeton Tigers football team =

American college football season

1999 Princeton Tigers football
- Conference: Ivy League
- Record: 3–7 (1–6 Ivy)
- Head coach: Steve Tosches (13th season)
- Captains: Hamin Abdullah; David Ferrara; Chuck Hastings
- Home stadium: Princeton Stadium

1999 Ivy League football standings
| | Conf. | | | Overall |
| Team | W | | L | W | | L |
|---|---|---|---|---|---|---|
| No. 25 Brown + | 6 | – | 1 | 9 | – | 1 |
| Yale + | 6 | – | 1 | 9 | – | 1 |
| Cornell | 5 | – | 2 | 7 | – | 3 |
| Penn | 4 | – | 3 | 5 | – | 5 |
| Harvard | 3 | – | 4 | 5 | – | 5 |
| Dartmouth | 2 | – | 5 | 2 | – | 8 |
| Columbia | 1 | – | 6 | 3 | – | 7 |
| Princeton | 1 | – | 6 | 3 | – | 7 |
+ – Conference co-champions; Rankings from The Sports Network poll

The 1999 Princeton Tigers football team was an American football team that represented Princeton University during the 1999 NCAA Division I-AA football season. Princeton tied for last in the Ivy League.

In their 13th and final year under head coach Steve Tosches, the Tigers compiled a 3–7 record and were outscored 225 to 184. Hamin Abdullah, David Ferrara and Chuck Hastings were the team captains.

Princeton's 1–6 conference record tied for seventh (and worst) in the Ivy League standings. The Tigers were outscored 184 to 135 by Ivy opponents.

The Tigers played their home games at Princeton Stadium, on the university campus in Princeton, New Jersey.

== Schedule ==
| Date | Opponent | Site | Result | Attendance | Source |
|---|---|---|---|---|---|
| September 18 | Cornell | Princeton Stadium; Princeton, NJ | L 3–20 | 15,288 | |
| September 25 | No. 15 Lehigh* | Princeton Stadium; Princeton, NJ | L 0–31 | 20,941 | |
| October 2 | Fordham* | Princeton Stadium; Princeton, NJ | W 27–0 | 11,705 | |
| October 9 | at Brown | Brown Stadium; Providence, RI | L 30–53 | 5,122 | |
| October 16 | at Lafayette* | Princeton Stadium; Princeton, NJ | W 22–10 | 14,805 | |
| October 23 | at Harvard | Harvard Stadium; Boston, MA (rivalry) | L 6–13 | 8,174 | |
| October 30 | Columbia | Princeton Stadium; Princeton, NJ | W 44–15 | 13,164 | |
| November 6 | at Penn | Franklin Field; Philadelphia, PA (rivalry) | L 13–41 | 18,305 | |
| November 13 | Yale | Princeton Stadium; Princeton, NJ (rivalry) | L 21–23 | 21,602 | |
| November 20 | at Dartmouth | Memorial Field; Hanover, NH | L 18–19 | 5,920 | |
*Non-conference game; Rankings from The Sports Network Poll released prior to the game
