= 1999 Yale Bulldogs football team =

American college football season

1999 Yale Bulldogs football

Ivy League co-champion
- Conference: Ivy League
- Record: 9–1 (6–1 Ivy)
- Head coach: Jack Siedlecki (3rd season)
- Home stadium: Yale Bowl

1999 Ivy League football standings
	Conf.			Overall
Team	W		L	W		L
No. 25 Brown +	6	–	1	9	–	1
Yale +	6	–	1	9	–	1
Cornell	5	–	2	7	–	3
Penn	4	–	3	5	–	5
Harvard	3	–	4	5	–	5
Dartmouth	2	–	5	2	–	8
Columbia	1	–	6	3	–	7
Princeton	1	–	6	3	–	7
+ – Conference co-champions; Rankings from The Sports Network poll

The 1999 Yale Bulldogs football team represented Yale University in the 1999 NCAA Division I-AA football season. The Bulldogs were led by third-year head coach Jack Siedlecki, played their home games at the Yale Bowl and finished tied for first place in the Ivy League with a 6–1 record, 9–1 overall.

== Schedule ==
Date	Opponent	Site	Result	Attendance	Source
September 18	Brown	Yale Bowl; New Haven, CT	L 24–25	17,398	
September 25	Valparaiso*	Yale Bowl; New Haven, CT	W 48–2	16,153	
October 2	at San Diego*	Torero Stadium; San Diego, CA	W 17–6	4,000	
October 9	Holy Cross*	Fitton Field; Worcester, MA	W 34–14	4,276	
October 16	Dartmouth	Yale Bowl; New Haven, CT	W 44–3	28,795	
October 23	at Columbia	Wien Stadium; New York, NY	W 49–29	2,750	
October 30	Penn	Yale Bowl; New Haven, CT	W 23–19	20,762	
November 6	at Cornell	Schoellkopf Field; Ithaca, NY	W 37–20	16,071	
November 13	at Princeton	Palmer Stadium; Princeton, NJ (rivalry)	W 23–21	21,602	
November 20	Harvard	Yale Bowl; New Haven, CT (The Game)	W 24–21	52,484	
*Non-conference game

== Roster ==
1999 Yale Bulldogs football team roster
Players
Coaches
Offense

Pos.	#	Name	Class
WR	21	Eric Johnson	Jr
TE	87	Jeffrey Ditman	So

Defense

Pos.	#	Name	Class

Special teams

Pos.	#	Name	Class

Head coach

- Jack Siedlecki

Coordinators/assistant coaches

Legend

- (C) Team captain
- (S) Suspended
- (I) Ineligible
- Injured
- Redshirt
