= Basilio Marchi =

American football player (1908–1997)

No. 24, 55
- Position: Guard

Personal information
- Born: July 14, 1908; Middleport, Ohio, U.S.
- Died: October 20, 1997 (aged 89)
- Listed height: 6 ft 2 in (1.88 m)
- Listed weight: 220 lb (100 kg)

Career information
- College: NYU

Career history
- Pittsburgh Pirates (1934); Philadelphia Eagles (1942)
- Stats at Pro Football Reference

Basilio John Marchi (July 14, 1908 – October 20, 1997) was an American professional football guard who played in the National Football League (NFL) with the Pittsburgh Pirates and Philadelphia Eagles. He played college football for the NYU Violets.

== Early life ==
Basilio John Marchi was born on July 14, 1908, in Middleport, Ohio. He attended Parkersburg High School in Parkersburg, West Virginia, and Bellefonte Academy in Bellefonte, Pennsylvania.

== College career ==
Marchi enrolled at New York University to play college football for the Violets. He was a three-year letterman from 1931 to 1933.

== Professional career ==
Marchi signed with the Pittsburgh Pirates of the National Football League (NFL) on March 10, 1934. He played in the first five games of the 1934 season, starting four, for the Pirates as a reserve guard before hurting his shoulder in the fifth game. He was then released on October 11, 1934. Marchi and Alex Rado later filed workers' compensation claims in Pennsylvania against the Steelers, asserting that they should receive salaries despite their injuries during the 1934 season. A judge ruled in their favor in January 1936.

Prior to the 1942 NFL season, many NFL players departed for service in World War II. Marchi returned to the NFL on August 10, 1942, signing with the Philadelphia Eagles. He appeared in seven games, starting one, for Philadelphia during the 1942 season.

== Personal life ==
Marchi later served in the United States Navy during World War II as a naval officer. He died on October 20, 1997.
