= 1999 Lafayette Leopards football team =

American college football season

1999 Lafayette Leopards football
- Conference: Patriot League
- Record: 4–7 (2–4 Patriot)
- Head coach: Bill Russo (19th season)
- Captains: John Fistner; Jim Goff; Chad Williamson
- Home stadium: Fisher Field

1999 Patriot League football standings
	Conf.			Overall
Team	W		L	W		L
No. 14 Lehigh +^	5	–	1	10	–	2
No. 18 Colgate +^	5	–	1	10	–	2
Towson	4	–	2	7	–	4
Bucknell	3	–	3	7	–	4
Lafayette	2	–	4	4	–	7
Holy Cross	2	–	4	3	–	8
Fordham	0	–	6	0	–	11
+ – Conference co-champions; ^ – NCAA Division I-AA playoff participant; Rankings from The Sports Network poll

The 1999 Lafayette Leopards football team was an American football team that represented Lafayette College during the 1999 NCAA Division I-AA football season. Lafayette tied for second-to-last in the Patriot League.

In their 19th and final year under head coach Bill Russo, the Leopards compiled a 4–7 record. John Fistner, Jim Goff and Chad Williamson were the team captains.

The Leopards were outscored 271 to 207. Lafayette's 2–4 conference tied for fifth place in the seven-team Patriot League standings.

Lafayette played its home games at Fisher Field on College Hill in Easton, Pennsylvania.

== Schedule ==
Date	Opponent	Site	Result	Attendance	Source
September 11	at Towson	Minnegan Stadium; Towson, MD	L 7–35	2,481	
September 18	at Holy Cross	Fitton Field; Worcester, MA	L 12–30	4,170	
September 25	at Brown*	Brown Stadium; Providence, RI	L 28–35	5,448	
October 2	Dartmouth*	Fisher Field; Easton, PA	W 20–10	7,821	
October 9	Colgate	Fisher Field; Easton, PA	L 14–56	2,931	
October 16	at Princeton*	Princeton Stadium; Princeton, NJ	L 10–22	14,805	
October 23	Bucknell	Fisher Field; Easton, PA	W 22–21	5,123	
October 30	Marist*	Fisher Field; Easton, PA	W 38–13	2,325	
November 6	Fordham	Fisher Field; Easton, PA	W 27–7	2,893	
November 13	Duquesne*	Fisher Field; Easton, PA	L 17–28	2,207	
November 20	at No. 14 Lehigh	Goodman Stadium; Bethlehem, PA (The Rivalry)	L 12–14	16,000	
*Non-conference game; Rankings from The Sports Network Poll released prior to the game
