= Dan Allen (American football) =

American football player and coach (1955–2004)

Biographical details
- Born: December 7, 1955; Cincinnati, Ohio, U.S.
- Died: May 16, 2004 (aged 48); Westboro, Massachusetts, U.S.

Playing career
- 1974–1977: Hanover
- Position: Linebacker

Coaching career (HC unless noted)
- 1978: Dayton (assistant)
- 1982–1989: Holy Cross (assistant)
- 1990–1995: Boston University
- 1996–2003: Holy Cross

Head coaching record
- Overall: 63–95
- Tournaments: 1–2 (NCAA D-I-AA playoffs)

Accomplishments and honors

Championships
- 1 Yankee Conference (1993); 1 Lambert Cup (1993)

Awards
- AFCA Coach of the Year (1993); Eddie Robinson Award (1993 ) Yankee Conference Coach of the Year (1993); Greater Boston Coach of the Year (1993); 2× New England Coach of the Year (1993, 2000)

Daniel L. Allen (December 7, 1955 – May 16, 2004) was an American college football player and coach. He served as the head football coach at Boston University from 1990 to 1995 and at the College of the Holy Cross from 1996 to 2003. Allen began his coaching career at the University of Dayton as a graduate assistant, where he earned a master's degree in 1979. He then served as an assistant coach at Holy Cross from 1982 to 1989 before moving on to his first head coaching job at Boston University. After a six-year stint for the Terriers, Allen finished his coaching career back at Holy Cross, where he led the Crusaders for eight seasons before being fired following a 1–11 campaign.

== Boston University's 1993 Cinderella season ==
Allen's most successful season as a coach came in 1993 with Boston University. Between 1990 and 1992, the Terriers football team had combined to win 12 total games against 21 losses. Heading into the 1993 season they had been picked to finish near the bottom of the Yankee Conference standings. What happened instead turned out to be one of the single biggest turnarounds in NCAA Division I-AA football history.

The Terriers began their season with a 45–0 win over Maine; this sparked the momentum that would carry through the rest of the regular season as Boston finished with an unblemished 11–0 record (8–0 Yankee). It is the school's only undefeated season and it had set a new high mark for wins as well. The Terriers earned their first Division I-AA playoffs berth in many years. In the first-round game, the Terriers defeated the Kurt Warner-led Northern Iowa Panthers, 27–21, in double overtime. The season would end one week later in the quarterfinals against Idaho when they lost 21–14. Both the 1993 Boston team and Allen himself garnered national recognition, awards and accolades for their Cinderella season.

In 1994, the Terriers once again performed well and finished with a 9–3 record, making the 1993 and 1994 seasons' combined overall record 21–4, which is the best two-year span in Boston University history.

== Family and death ==
Allen was married to his wife, Laura, and the couple had three children together: Mark, Taylor and Danielle. He died on May 16, 2004, at his home in Westboro, Massachusetts, after succumbing to complications of ALS.

Both of Dan's sons have continued his strong legacy of coaching football. Mark is the current head football coach at Algonquin Regional High School in Northborough, MA, and has been there for over 9 years in total, previously as the Defensive Coordinator. Taylor has also been involved in coaching, and was the head football coach at Algonquin from 2017 to 2019 after serving as an assistant coach for three years prior.

== Head coaching record ==
Year	Team	Overall	Conference	Standing	Bowl/playoffs	TSN^{#}
Boston University Terriers (Yankee Conference) (1990–1995)
1990	Boston University	5–6	4–4	6th		
1991	Boston University	4–7	3–5	T–4th		
1992	Boston University	3–8	2–6	8th		
1993	Boston University	12–1	8–0	1st (New England)	L NCAA Division I-AA Quarterfinal	6
1994	Boston University	9–3	6–2	2nd (New England)	L NCAA Division I-AA First Round	9
1995	Boston University	3–8	1–7	T–5th (New England)		
Boston University:		36–33	24–24			
Holy Cross Crusaders (Patriot League) (1996–2003)
1996	Holy Cross	2–9	1–4	6th		
1997	Holy Cross	4–7	2–4	4th		
1998	Holy Cross	2–9	1–5	7th		
1999	Holy Cross	3–8	2–4	5th		
2000	Holy Cross	7–4	4–2	2nd		
2001	Holy Cross	4–6	3–4	5th		
2002	Holy Cross	4–8	2–5	7th		
2003	Holy Cross	1–11	1–6	8th		
Holy Cross:		27–40	9–15			
Total:		63–95				
National championship Conference title Conference division title or championship game berth
^{#}Rankings from final The Sports Network poll.
