= 1999 Colgate Red Raiders football team =

American college football season

1999 Colgate Red Raiders football

Patriot League co-champion

NCAA Division I-AA First Round, L 13–56 at Illinois State
- Conference: Patriot League

Ranking
- Sports Network: No. 18
- Record: 10–2 (5–1 Patriot)
- Head coach: Dick Biddle (4th season)
- Captains: Tom McCarroll; Ryan Vena
- Home stadium: Andy Kerr Stadium

1999 Patriot League football standings
	Conf.			Overall
Team	W		L	W		L
No. 14 Lehigh +^	5	–	1	10	–	2
No. 18 Colgate +^	5	–	1	10	–	2
Towson	4	–	2	7	–	4
Bucknell	3	–	3	7	–	4
Lafayette	2	–	4	4	–	7
Holy Cross	2	–	4	3	–	8
Fordham	0	–	6	0	–	11
+ – Conference co-champions; ^ – NCAA Division I-AA playoff participant; Rankings from The Sports Network poll

The 1999 Colgate Red Raiders football team was an American football team that represented Colgate University during the 1999 NCAA Division I-AA football season. Colgate was the Patriot League co-champion, but lost in the first round of the national Division I-AA playoffs.

In its fourth season under head coach Dick Biddle, the team compiled a 10–2 record. Tom McCarroll and Ryan Vena were the team captains.

The Red Raiders outscored opponents 430 to 253. Colgate's 5–1 record earned a tie for the Patriot League championship.

Unranked in the preseason Division I-AA national poll, the Red Raiders briefly appeared at No. 24 early in the season, then returned to the top 25 in mid-November. Colgate ended the year ranked No. 18 and qualified for the Division I-AA playoffs by winning its conference, even though it was the lower-ranked of the two Patriot League co-champions; Lehigh also qualified, however, with an at-large berth. Both Patriot League playoff teams lost in the first round.

Colgate played its home games at Andy Kerr Stadium in Hamilton, New York.

== Schedule ==
Date	Opponent	Rank	Site	Result	Attendance	Source
September 4	Maine*		Andy Kerr Stadium; Hamilton, NY	W 28–21	6,006	
September 11	Bucknell	No. 24	Andy Kerr Stadium; Hamilton, NY	L 16–21	5,010	
September 18	at Fordham		Coffey Field; Bronx, NY	W 49–24	5,177	
September 25	at Dartmouth*		Memorial Field; Hanover, NH	W 35–3	7,525	
October 2	at Harvard*		Harvard Stadium; Boston, MA	W 24–21	7,468	
October 9	at Lafayette		Fisher Field; Easton, PA	W 56–14	2,931	
October 16	Cornell*		Andy Kerr Stadium; Hamilton, NY (rivalry)	W 55–16	8,155	
October 23	at Saint Mary's*		Saint Mary's Stadium; Moraga, CA	W 43–13	1,526	
November 6	No. 9 Lehigh		Andy Kerr Stadium; Hamilton, NY	W 28–24	6,228	
November 13	Towson	No. 22	Andy Kerr Stadium; Hamilton, NY	W 38–14	4,224	
November 20	at Holy Cross	No. 19	Fitton Field; Worcester, MA	W 45–26	5,341	
November 29	at No. 3 Illinois State*	No. 18	Hancock Stadium; Normal, IL (NCAA Division I-AA First Round)	L 13–56	7,133	
*Non-conference game; Rankings from The Sports Network Poll released prior to the game
