= 1999 Fordham Rams football team =

American college football season

1999 Fordham Rams football
- Conference: Patriot League
- Record: 0–11 (0–6 Patriot)
- Head coach: Dave Clawson (1st season)
- Offensive coordinator: Ed Foley (1st season)
- Defensive coordinator: Dave Cohen (1st season)
- Captains: Jon Piela; Jim Walls
- Home stadium: Coffey Field

1999 Patriot League football standings
	Conf.			Overall
Team	W		L	W		L
No. 14 Lehigh +^	5	–	1	10	–	2
No. 18 Colgate +^	5	–	1	10	–	2
Towson	4	–	2	7	–	4
Bucknell	3	–	3	7	–	4
Lafayette	2	–	4	4	–	7
Holy Cross	2	–	4	3	–	8
Fordham	0	–	6	0	–	11
+ – Conference co-champions; ^ – NCAA Division I-AA playoff participant; Rankings from The Sports Network poll

The 1999 Fordham Rams football team was an American football team that represented Fordham University during the 1999 NCAA Division I-AA football season. Fordham lost every game and finished last in the Patriot League.

In their first year under head coach Dave Clawson, the Rams compiled an 0–11 record. Jon Piela and Jim Walls were the team captains.

The Rams were outscored 410 to 170. Their winless (0–6) conference record placed last in the seven-team Patriot League standings.

Fordham played its home games at Jack Coffey Field on the university campus in The Bronx, in New York City.

== Schedule ==
Date	Opponent	Site	Result	Attendance	Source
September 11	No. 20 Lehigh	Coffey Field; Bronx, NY	L 7–49	4,177	
September 18	Colgate	Coffey Field; Bronx, NY	L 24–49	5,177	
September 25	at Cornell*	Schoellkopf Field; Ithaca, NY	L 14–42	11,697	
October 2	at Princeton*	Princeton Stadium; Princeton, NJ	L 0–27	11,705	
October 9	at Penn*	Franklin Field; Philadelphia, PA	L 18–35	6,810	
October 16	Harvard^{†}*	Coffey Field; Bronx, NY	L 30–37	4,172	
October 23	at Towson	Minnegan Stadium; Towson, MD	L 23–25	4,031	
October 30	Brown*	Coffey Field; Bronx, NY	L 18–37		
November 6	at Lafayette	Fisher Field; Easton, PA	L 7–27	2,893	
November 13	Holy Cross	Coffey Field; Bronx, NY (rivalry)	L 14–37	2,947	
November 20	Bucknell	Coffey Field; Bronx, NY	L 15–45	3,722	
*Non-conference game; ^{†}Homecoming; Rankings from The Sports Network Poll released prior to the game
