= 1999 Bucknell Bison football team =

American college football season

1999 Bucknell Bison football
- Conference: Patriot League
- Record: 7–4 (3–3 Patriot)
- Head coach: Tom Gadd (5th season)
- Captains: Corey Hurley; Dan Palko; John Papadakis
- Home stadium: Christy Mathewson–Memorial Stadium

1999 Patriot League football standings
	Conf.			Overall
Team	W		L	W		L
No. 14 Lehigh +^	5	–	1	10	–	2
No. 18 Colgate +^	5	–	1	10	–	2
Towson	4	–	2	7	–	4
Bucknell	3	–	3	7	–	4
Lafayette	2	–	4	4	–	7
Holy Cross	2	–	4	3	–	8
Fordham	0	–	6	0	–	11
+ – Conference co-champions; ^ – NCAA Division I-AA playoff participant; Rankings from The Sports Network poll

The 1999 Bucknell Bison football team was an American football team that represented Bucknell University during the 1999 NCAA Division I-AA football season. It finished fourth in the Patriot League.

Bucknell played its home games at Christy Mathewson–Memorial Stadium on the university campus in Lewisburg, Pennsylvania.

In its fifth year under head coach Tom Gadd, the Bison compiled a 7–4 record. Corey Hurley, Dan Palko and John Papadakis were the team captains.

The Bison outscored opponents 320 to 233. Bucknell's 3–3 conference record placed fourth in the seven-team Patriot League standings.

== Schedule ==
Date	Opponent	Site	Result	Attendance	Source
September 4	Morgan State*	Christy Mathewson–Memorial Stadium; Lewisburg, PA	W 37–10	2,194	
September 11	at No. 24 Colgate	Andy Kerr Stadium; Hamilton, NY	W 21–16	5,010	
September 18	Towson	Christy Mathewson–Memorial Stadium; Lewisburg, PA	L 20–27	2,921	
September 25	Delaware State^	Christy Mathewson–Memorial Stadium; Lewisburg, PA	W 38–28	4,865	
October 2	at Penn*	Franklin Field; Philadelphia, PA	W 23–16	5,286	
October 9	at Columbia*	Wien Stadium; New York, NY	L 7–10	2,883	
October 16	Duquesne^{†}*	Christy Mathewson–Memorial Stadium; Lewisburg, PA	W 49–20		
October 23	at Lafayette	Fisher Field; Easton, PA	L 21–22	5,123	
November 6	Holy Cross	Christy Mathewson–Memorial Stadium; Lewisburg, PA	W 32–21	1,137	
November 13	No. 16 Lehigh	Christy Mathewson–Memorial Stadium; Lewisburg, PA	L 27–48	3,849	
November 20	at Fordham	Coffey Field; Bronx, NY	W 45–15	3,722	
*Non-conference game; ^{†}Homecoming; ^ Parents Weekend; Rankings from The Sports Network Poll released prior to the game
