= 1999 Penn Quakers football team =

American college football season

1999 Penn Quakers football
- Conference: Ivy League
- Record: 5–5 (4–3 Ivy)
- Head coach: Al Bagnoli (8th season)
- Defensive coordinator: Ray Priore (2nd season)
- Home stadium: Franklin Field

1999 Ivy League football standings
	Conf.			Overall
Team	W		L	W		L
No. 25 Brown +	6	–	1	9	–	1
Yale +	6	–	1	9	–	1
Cornell	5	–	2	7	–	3
Penn	4	–	3	5	–	5
Harvard	3	–	4	5	–	5
Dartmouth	2	–	5	2	–	8
Columbia	1	–	6	3	–	7
Princeton	1	–	6	3	–	7
+ – Conference co-champions; Rankings from The Sports Network poll

The 1999 Penn Quakers football team represented the University of Pennsylvania in the 1999 NCAA Division I-AA football season. Penn compiled a 5–5 record (4–3 conference record) and placed fourth in the Ivy League.

== Schedule ==
Date	Opponent	Site	Result	Attendance	Source
September 18	Dartmouth	Franklin Field; Philadelphia, PA	W 17–6	9,377	
September 25	at Villanova*	Franklin Field; Philadelphia, PA	L 6–34	18,722	
October 2	Bucknell*	Franklin Field; Philadelphia, PA	L 16–23	5,286	
October 9	Fordham*	Franklin Field; Philadelphia, PA	W 35–18	6,810	
October 16	at Columbia	Wien Stadium; New York, NY	W 41–17	7,702	
October 23	Brown	Franklin Field; Philadelphia, PA	L 37–44	13,116	
October 30	at Yale	Yale Bowl; New Haven, CT	L 19–23	20,762	
November 6	Princeton	Franklin Field; Philadelphia, PA (rivalry)	W 41–13	18,305	
November 13	at Harvard	Harvard Stadium; Boston, MA (rivalry)	W 21–17	6,990	
November 20	Cornell	Schoellkopf Field; Ithaca, NY (rivalry)	L 12–20	6,928	
*Non-conference game
