= 1999 Dartmouth Big Green football team =

American college football season

1999 Dartmouth Big Green football
- Conference: Ivy League
- Record: 2–8 (2–5 Ivy)
- Head coach: John Lyons (8th season)
- Offensive coordinator: Roger Hughes (8th season)
- Defensive coordinator: Tom Gilmore (3rd season)
- Captains: Reggie Belhomme; Caleb Moore; Thomas Reusser; Kyle Schroeder
- Home stadium: Memorial Field

1999 Ivy League football standings
	Conf.			Overall
Team	W		L	W		L
No. 25 Brown +	6	–	1	9	–	1
Yale +	6	–	1	9	–	1
Cornell	5	–	2	7	–	3
Penn	4	–	3	5	–	5
Harvard	3	–	4	5	–	5
Dartmouth	2	–	5	2	–	8
Columbia	1	–	6	3	–	7
Princeton	1	–	6	3	–	7
+ – Conference co-champions; Rankings from The Sports Network poll

The 1999 Dartmouth Big Green football team represented Dartmouth College in the 1999 NCAA Division I-AA football season. The Big Green were led by eighth-year head coach John Lyons and played their home games at Memorial Field in Hanover, New Hampshire. The Big Green finished the season 2–8 overall and 2–5 in Ivy League play, to finish in sixth place. Team captains were Reggie Belhomme, Caleb Moore, Thomas Reusser and Kyle Schroeder.

== Schedule ==
Date	Time	Opponent	Site	Result	Attendance	Source
September 18	1:00 p.m.	at Penn	Franklin Field; Philadelphia, PA	L 6–17	9,377	
September 25		Colgate*	Memorial Field; Hanover, NH	L 3–35	7,525	
October 2	1:00 p.m.	at Lafayette*	Fisher Field; Easton, PA	L 10–20	7,821	
October 9	1:00 p.m.	Lehigh*	Memorial Field; Hanover, NH	L 14–30	6,109	
October 16	1:00 p.m.	at Yale	Yale Bowl; New Haven, CT	L 3–44	28,795	
October 23	1:00 p.m.	Cornell	Memorial Field; Hanover, NH	W 20–17	8,023	
October 30	1:00 p.m.	at Harvard	Harvard Stadium; Boston, MA	L 21–63	13,706	
November 6	1:00 p.m.	at Columbia	Wien Stadium; New York, NY	L 14–21	4,310	
November 13	1:00 p.m.	Brown	Memorial Field; Hanover, NH	L 28–35	6,113	
November 20	1:00 p.m.	Princeton	Memorial Field; Hanover, NH	W 19–18	5,920	
*Non-conference game

== Roster ==
1999 Dartmouth Big Green football team roster
Players
Coaches
Offense

Pos.	#	Name	Class
QB	5	Brian Mann	Fr
WR	6	Matt Norton	Jr
QB	10	Greg Smith	So
WR	13	Mike Poncy	Sr
WR	19	John Vogler	Jr
C	61	Ted Heyn	Sr

Defense

Pos.	#	Name	Class
CB	7	Clay Nelson	Fr
SS	49	Andy McElaney	Sr
DL	89	Peter Bjorklund	Fr
DE	90	Kyle Schroeder	Sr
DT	92	Mathew DeGutes	Fr
DE	92	Peter Fritz	Sr
DL	93	Ben Young	Fr
DE	94	Greg Dietrick	Sr
DE	95	Matthew Birdseye	Fr
LB	96	Joe Vinci	So
LB	97	Dan Piening	Sr
DT	98	Matt Walker	Jr
DE	99	Dan Hutchinson	Jr

Special teams

Pos.	#	Name	Class

Head coach

- John Lyons

Coordinators/assistant coaches

Legend

- (C) Team captain
- (S) Suspended
- (I) Ineligible
- Injured
- Redshirt

Roster

== Team leaders ==
=== Passing ===
Player	Att	Comp	Yds	TD	INT
Brian Mann	313	188	1,848	7	16
