= Lou Piccone =

American football player (born 1949)

No. 89
- Positions: Wide receiver, kick returner

Personal information
- Born: July 17, 1949 (age 77); Vineland, New Jersey, U.S.
- Listed height: 5 ft 9 in (1.75 m)
- Listed weight: 175 lb (79 kg)

Career information
- High school: Vineland
- College: West Liberty State
- NFL draft: 1972: undrafted

Career history
- Youngstown Hardhats (1972); Bridgeport Jets (1973); New York Jets (1974–1976); Buffalo Bills (1977–1982)

Awards and highlights
- NFL kickoff return yards leader (1974)

Career NFL statistics
- Receptions: 100
- Receiving yard: 1,380
- Receiving touchdowns: 6
- Stats at Pro Football Reference

Louis James Piccone (born July 17, 1949) is an American former professional football player who was a wide receiver and kick returner for nine seasons in the National Football League (NFL) with the New York Jets and Buffalo Bills. He played college football for the West Liberty State Hilltoppers.

Raised in Vineland, New Jersey, Piccone played prep football at Vineland High School; he was honored in 2022 with a street renaming and a key to the city of Vineland, recognizing him as the first athlete from the city to play in the NFL.

Piccone played with the Youngstown Hardhats of the Midwest Football League in 1972. He played with the Bridgeport Jets of the Atlantic Coast Football League in 1973.

Piccone caught 100 passes for 1,380 yards and six touchdowns in nine years in the NFL.

Piccone led the NFL with 39 kickoff returns and 961 kickoff return yards as a rookie with the Jets in 1974. He again led the NFL with 31 kickoff returns in 1976. He also finished 5th in the league that season with 699 kickoff return yards.
