= Alex Rado =

American football player and coach (1911–1995)

No. 12
- Position: Back

Personal information
- Born: July 19, 1911; Dayton, Ohio, U.S.
- Died: August 30, 1995 (aged 84); Dayton, Ohio, U.S.
- Listed height: 6 ft 1 in (1.85 m)
- Listed weight: 200 lb (91 kg)

Career information
- High school: Roosevelt (Dayton)
- College: New River State (1931–1933)

Career history

Playing
- Kiefer Drugs (1933); Pittsburgh Pirates (1934); Dayton Kesslers (1935); Los Angeles Bulldogs (1936); Dayton Rosies / Bombers (1936–1939); Dakota Streeters (1940–1942); Dayton Rockets / John Stanko Barons / Wiedemann Buds (1946–1949)

Coaching
- Dayton Bombers (1939) Assistant coach; Dakota Streeters (1940–1942) Head coach; Dayton Rockets / John Stanko Barons / Wiedemann Buds (1946–1949) Head coach
- Stats at Pro Football Reference

Alexander Rado (July 19, 1911 – August 30, 1995) was an American football player and coach. He played for the Pittsburgh Pirates of the National Football League (NFL) in 1934.

== Early life ==
Rado was born on July 19, 1911, in Dayton, Ohio, to Louis and Mary Rado. Rado graduated from Roosevelt High School in Dayton, Ohio, in 1929. He played with the Lakeside Maroons, a semi-professional football team, during high school. He played college football for New River State College from 1931 through 1933. He was named captain for the 1933 team. Rado was inducted into his college's hall of fame and the West Virginia Intercollegiate Athletic Conference named him to their "All Time Star" 50th anniversary team in 1974.

== Professional career ==
Rado joined the Kiefer Drugs, a semi-professional football team in Ohio, for the 1933 season. He also played for the Dakota Streeters, a sandlot football team. He signed a contract with the Pittsburgh Pirates of the National Football League on August 9, 1934. He played in eight games for the Pirates in 1934, rushing for 210 yards. His salary was $100 per game, and he missed one month of the season due to a broken collarbone suffered during a tackle of Bronko Nagurski. He was released before the start of the 1935 season on September 6, 1935. He and Basilio Marchi filed workers' compensation claims in Pennsylvania against the Steelers, asserting that they should receive salaries despite their injuries during the 1934 season. A judge ruled in their favor in January 1936.

Rado played for the semi-pro Dayton Kesslers for the 1935 season. He joined the Los Angeles Bulldogs in 1936, and signed with the Dayton Rosies of the Midwest Football League in December 1936. He stayed on with the Rosies through the 1937 and 1938 seasons. The team became the Dayton Bombers in 1939, with Rado shifting to a role as a player-coach. Rado was a player-coach for the Dakotas Athletic Club semi-professional football team in 1940. His team went undefeated on the season. Rado and the Dakotas joined the Ohio Professional Football League for the 1941 season. He was a player-coach again in 1942 for the Dakotas.

Rado founded the Dayton Rockets in 1946, with his role again as a player-coach. The team won the Dayton semi-pro city over the Dayton Bombers, 18–12, on December 1, 1946. He announced his retirement from playing after 1946, but returned as a player during the 1947 season. The team joined the Inter-State Semipro Football League in 1947, but left the league during the season. They won the city championship over the Bombers again by a score of 47–0.

The team became the John Stanko Barons for the 1948 season, with Rado playing quarterback. They went 7–1–1 in 1948 before playing in the city championship again opposite the Bombers, which they won for the third year in a row with a score of 30–6. Renamed the Wiedemann Buds, they played for the city championship against the Dayton Bombers again in 1949 and won their fourth title, 25–6.

== Post-football ==
Rado played in a Dayton softball league in 1963. He also officiated high school football games and played bowling. He worked for Delco Products as a tool process engineer after moving back to Dayton in 1936. Rado had two children with his wife Stella, and remarried to Marge after his first wife's death. He died on August 30, 1995.
