= Quentin Lowry =

American football player (born 1955)

No. 56, 64
- Position: Linebacker

Personal information
- Born: November 11, 1955 (age 70); Cleveland, Ohio, U.S.
- Listed height: 6 ft 2 in (1.88 m)
- Listed weight: 232 lb (105 kg)

Career information
- High school: Shaker Heights (OH)
- College: Youngstown State
- NFL draft: 1979: 12th round, 329th overall pick

Career history
- Dallas Cowboys (1979)*; Los Angeles Rams (1980)*; Youngstown Hardhats (1980); Hamilton Tiger-Cats (1981)*; Washington Redskins (1981–1983); Tampa Bay Buccaneers (1983)
- * Offseason or practice squad member only

Awards and highlights
- Super Bowl champion (XVII); Division II All-American (1978); Mid-Continent Conference Defensive Lineman of the Year (1978)
- Stats at Pro Football Reference

Quentin Ivory Lowry (born November 11, 1955) is an American former professional football player who was a linebacker in the National Football League (NFL) for the Washington Redskins and Tampa Bay Buccaneers. He played college football for the Youngstown State Penguins.

== Early life ==
Lowry attended Shaker Heights High School, where he received All-League and All-District honors. He accepted a scholarship from Division II Youngstown State University.

As a sophomore, he became a starter at defensive end, registering 105 tackles (11 for loss) and 3 fumble recoveries. The next year, he had 32 tackles (2 for loss) and one interception.

As a senior, he was a stand-up defensive end with pass coverage responsibilities. He posted 94 tackles (21 for loss) and 5 fumble recoveries, while helping his team reach the 1978 Mid-Continent Conference Championship and the quarterfinals of the NCAA Division II Playoffs. His teammate Greg Fitzpatrick was also drafted by the Dallas Cowboys.

He finished his career with 231 tackles (34 for loss), 8 fumble recoveries and one interception. In 1999, he was inducted into the Youngstown State University Athletics Hall of Fame.

== Professional career ==
=== Dallas Cowboys ===
Lowry was selected by the Dallas Cowboys in the twelfth round (329th overall) of the 1979 NFL draft, with the intention of playing him at outside linebacker. He was waived on August 6.

=== Los Angeles Rams ===
In 1980, he was signed by the Los Angeles Rams. He was released on August 19. He played for the Youngstown Hardhats thereafter.

=== Hamilton-Tiger Cats ===
In March 1981, he was signed by the Hamilton Tiger-Cats of the Canadian Football League. He was released before the start of the season.

=== Washington Redskins ===
In 1981, he was signed by the Washington Redskins. On August 24, he was placed on the injured reserve list with a thigh injury and returned to play in 9 games mainly on special teams.

He was released on September 5, 1982. He was recalled on September 7 and played in 9 games. He was a part of the Super Bowl XVII winning team.

Lowry was cut on August 28, 1983. On September 20, he was re-signed to replace Monte Coleman who was placed on the injured reserve list.

=== Tampa Bay Buccaneers ===
On November 3, he was signed as a free agent by the Tampa Bay Buccaneers. On December 15, he was placed on the injured reserve list with a knee injury.

== Personal life ==
His brother Orlando played in the National Football League for the Indianapolis Colts. Lowry currently lives in Maryland with his wife Tammy, and daughters Tai and Kelli.
