= American Football Conference (1959–1961) =

- Sport: American football
- Founded: 1959
- Folded: 1961
- Claim to fame: The first football league to operate teams in both the United States and Canada
- No. of teams: 8
- Country: United States; Canada
- Last champion: Sarnia Golden Bears
- Related competitions: Ontario Rugby Football Union, United Football League & Atlantic Coast Football League

The American Football Conference was a low-level American football minor league that operated between 1959 and 1961. The AFC was the first football league to operate teams in both the United States and Canada.

In 1961 the league held the longest title game in pro football history, when Sarnia Golden Bears beat Toledo Tornadoes 39-33 in three overtimes.

== History ==
The American Football Conference was formed in July 1959 with the assistance of National Football League commissioner Bert Bell. It was an association of American football clubs that operated from 1959 to 1961 that were mostly based in Ohio, but had some teams from Pennsylvania, New Jersey, Michigan, and Canada. During its existence the AFC operated between semi-professional and minor league level (varied per team). After playing as a semi-professional league for the 1959 and 1960 seasons, the AFC became a minor professional league for the 1961 season.

The Columbus Colts played in the AFC in 1960, then left to help form the United Football League in 1961. A new franchise called the Ohio Colts replaced Columbus in the AFC for 1961.

The three biggest teams in the circuit were Toledo Tornadoes and Duquesne Ironmen that would join the United Football League and the Atlantic Coast Football League (respectively) and the Sarnia Golden Bears that had survived the collapse of the Ontario Rugby Football Union. Sarnia won the AFC's last championship after beating Toledo in three overtimes, the longest title game in pro football history.

The formation of the UFL and ACFL diminished the level of play, and although the circuit did not immediately die out, after 1961 it was now a purely semi-professional circuit, and the league dissolved entirely before the 1962 season.

=== 1959 ===
Team	W	L	T	PF	PA
Duquesne Ironmen	8	0	0	195	29
Melvindale Redskins	6	2	0	133	74
Dayton Triangles	3	5	0	84	105
Toledo Tornadoes	2	6	0	65	132
Newark Rams	1	7	0	26	145

=== 1960 ===
Team	W	L	T	PF	PA
Columbus Colts	9	1	0	404	80
Massillon Tigertown Stars	8	2	0	269	139
Melvindale Redskins	5	5	0	299	242
Duquesne Ironmen	4	6	0	158	211
Dayton Triangles	4	6	0	85	255
Toledo Tornadoes	0	10	0	69	357

Larry Buckles (HB, Columbus) was the offensive MVP, Stan Jones (LB, Columbus) was the defensive MVP.

=== 1961 ===
Eastern Division
Team	W	L	T	PF	PA
Sarnia Golden Bears	10	0	0	323	66
Port Hurton Raiders	6	4	0	178	107
Ohio Colts	4	5	0	103	138
Dayton Triangles	3	7	0	86	235
Western Division
Team	W	L	T	PF	PA
Toledo Tornadoes	9	1	0	284	66
Detroit Redskins	4	5	0	117	195
Cincinnati Mohawk Indians	3	7	0	67	201
Massillon Tigertown Stars	0	10	0	6	147

Championship Game: Sarnia 39, Toledo 33 (3OT)
