= Toronto, Ohio =

- City
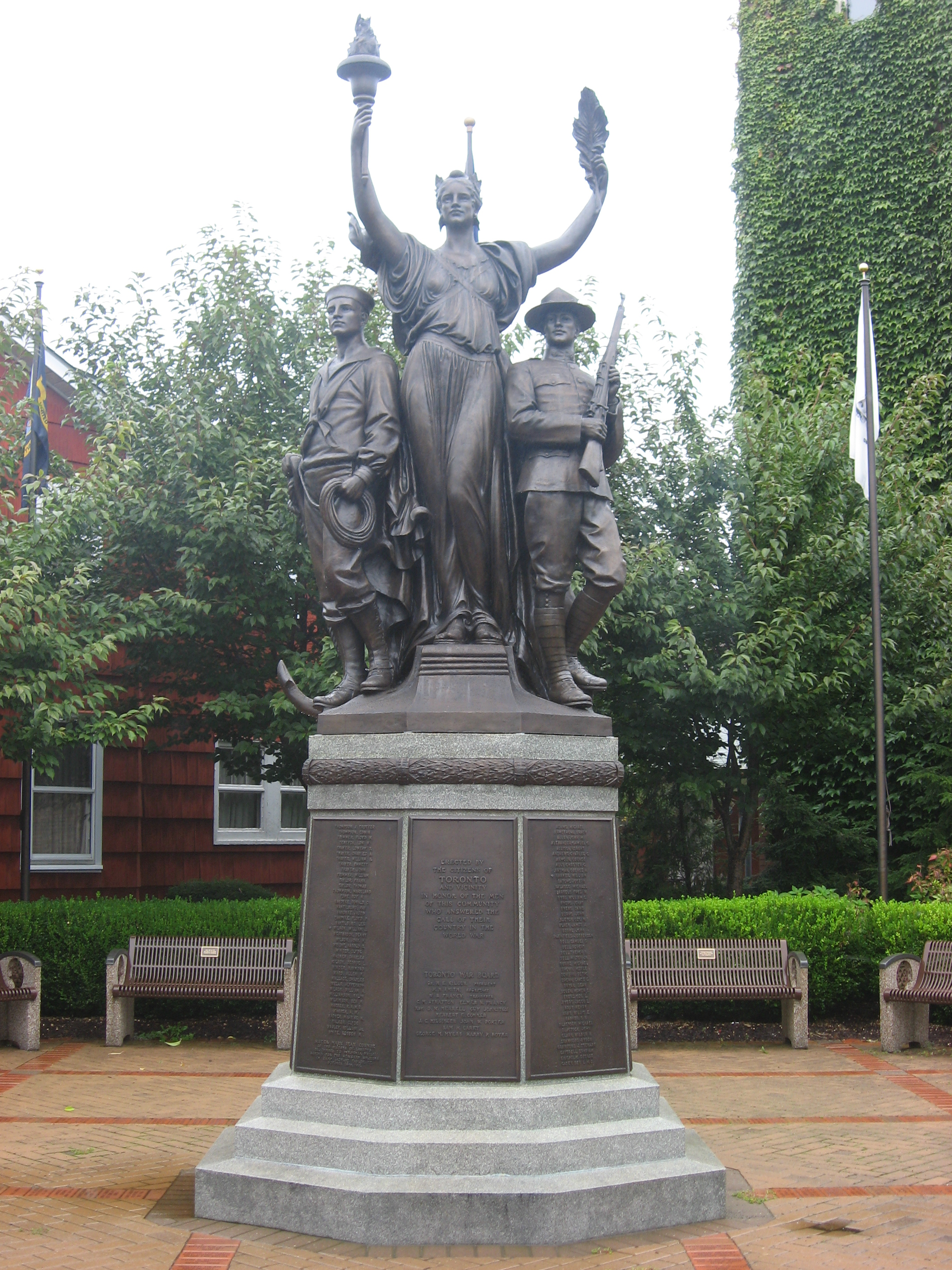
- World War I memorial
- Nicknames: The Gem City, T-Town
- Interactive map of Toronto, Ohio
- Location within Ohio Location within the United States
- Coordinates: 40°27′26″N 80°37′16″W
- Country: United States
- State: Ohio
- County: Jefferson
- Townships: Island Creek, Knox
- Named for: Toronto, Canada

Area
  - Total: 2.44 sq mi (6.33 km^{2})
  - Land: 2.08 sq mi (5.40 km^{2})
  - Water: 0.36 sq mi (0.93 km^{2})
- Elevation: 738 ft (225 m)

Population (2020)
  - Total: 5,303
  - Density: 2,542.3/sq mi (981.58/km^{2})
- Time zone: UTC−5 (Eastern (EST))
  - Summer (DST): UTC−4 (EDT)
- ZIP code: 43964
- Area code: 740
- FIPS code: 39-77112
- GNIS feature ID: 2397037
- Website: torontooh.gov

Toronto is a city in Jefferson County, Ohio, United States, on the Ohio River. The population was 5,303 at the 2020 census, making it the second-most populous city in Jefferson County. It is part of the Weirton–Steubenville metropolitan area.

== History ==
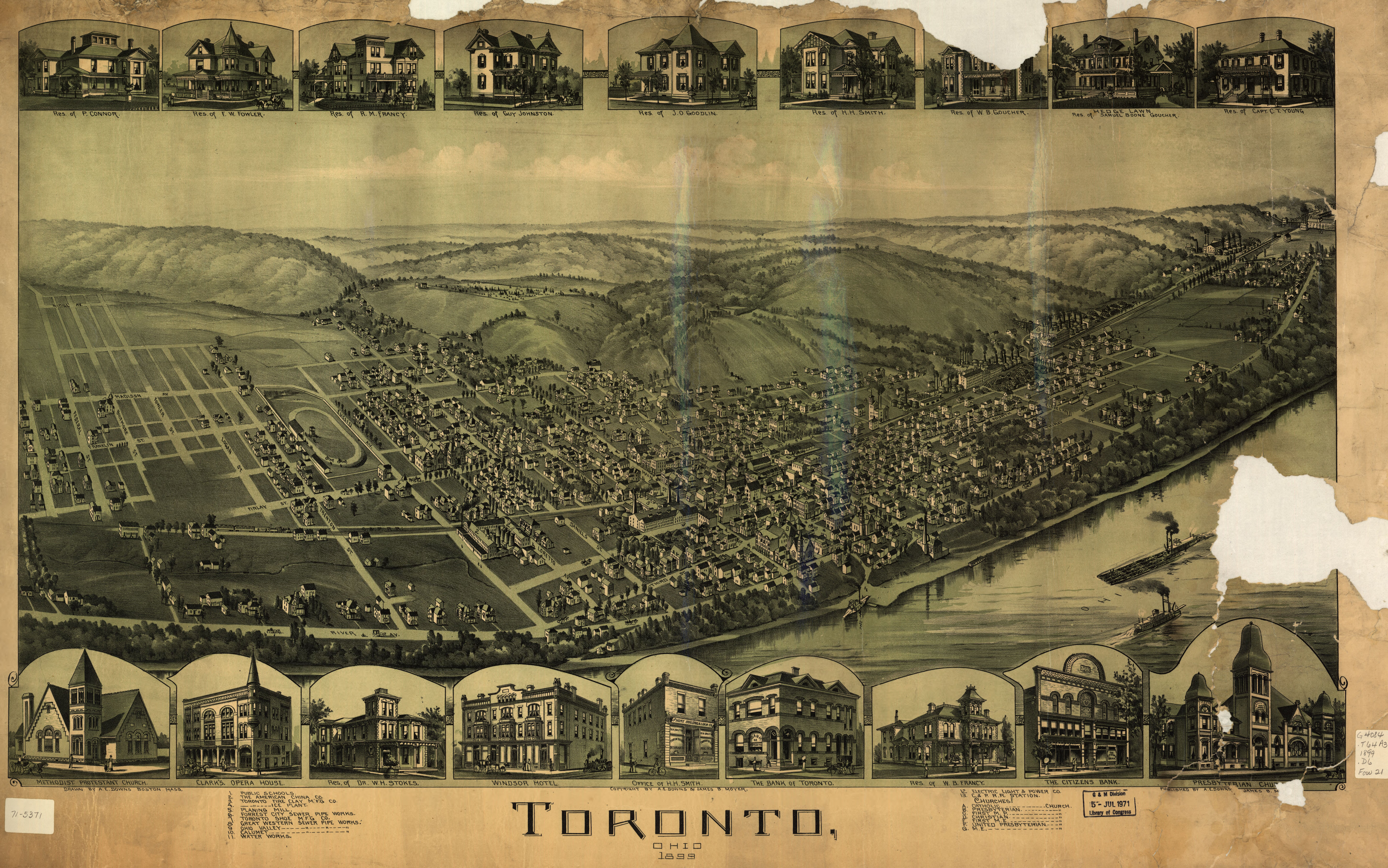
1899 bird's-eye view of Toronto

The area was first settled in the 19th century, when it was known as Newburg's Landing. When the railway was built, however, the area's name was changed to Sloanes Station. In 1881, following a vote, the town was incorporated under its present name, inspired by Toronto, Ontario. The name was suggested by pioneer manufacturer Thomas M. Daniels and his business associate, W. F. Dunsbaugh—a Toronto, Ontario native—who believed it was a place worth emulating. Along with its Canadian counterpart, it is one of only two incorporated cities in the world named Toronto.

In the 20th century, the town became a center of heavy industry with a number of large factories in and around the town. In the 1980s and 1990s the city, along with the rest of the region, declined sharply as manufacturing jobs left. Titanium Metals Corporation, the world's largest supplier of titanium metals, is the major employer in the city.

== Geography ==
Toronto is located at 40°27′44″N 80°36′16″W (40.462266, -80.604443), and is about 45 minutes from Pittsburgh. According to the United States Census Bureau, the city has a total area of 2.14 square miles (5.54 km^{2}), of which 1.86 square miles (4.82 km^{2}) is land and 0.28 square miles (0.73 km^{2}) is water. It is about 6 miles (9.7 km) north of Steubenville, Ohio, and included in the Weirton–Steubenville metropolitan area.

== Demographics ==
Historical population
Census	Pop.	Note	%±
1890	2,536		—
1900	3,526		39.0%
1910	4,271		21.1%
1920	4,684		9.7%
1930	7,044		50.4%
1940	7,426		5.4%
1950	7,253		−2.3%
1960	7,780		7.3%
1970	7,705		−1.0%
1980	6,934		−10.0%
1990	6,127		−11.6%
2000	5,676		−7.4%
2010	5,091		−10.3%
2020	5,303		4.2%

=== 2020 census ===
As of the 2020 census, Toronto had a population of 5,303. The median age was 43.7 years. 20.4% of residents were under the age of 18 and 21.6% of residents were 65 years of age or older. For every 100 females there were 90.5 males, and for every 100 females age 18 and over there were 84.9 males age 18 and over.

100.0% of residents lived in urban areas, while 0.0% lived in rural areas.

There were 2,354 households in Toronto, of which 25.2% had children under the age of 18 living in them. Of all households, 39.3% were married-couple households, 18.4% were households with a male householder and no spouse or partner present, and 33.6% were households with a female householder and no spouse or partner present. About 34.7% of all households were made up of individuals and 17.7% had someone living alone who was 65 years of age or older.

There were 2,591 housing units, of which 9.1% were vacant. The homeowner vacancy rate was 3.0% and the rental vacancy rate was 8.3%.

Racial composition as of the 2020 census
Race	Number	Percent
White	4,863	91.7%
Black or African American	85	1.6%
American Indian and Alaska Native	8	0.2%
Asian	32	0.6%
Native Hawaiian and Other Pacific Islander	7	0.1%
Some other race	13	0.2%
Two or more races	295	5.6%
Hispanic or Latino (of any race)	50	0.9%

=== 2010 census ===
As of the census of 2010, there were 5,091 people, 2,278 households, and 1,395 families living in the city. The population density was 2,737.1 inhabitants per square mile (1,056.8/km^{2}). There were 2,516 housing units at an average density of 1,352.7 per square mile (522.3/km^{2}). The racial makeup of the city was 97.1% White, 1.1% African American, 0.2% Native American, 0.2% Asian, 0.1% from other races, and 1.3% from two or more races. Hispanic or Latino of any race were 0.8% of the population.

There were 2,278 households, of which 26.2% had children under the age of 18 living with them, 42.5% were married couples living together, 14.0% had a female householder with no husband present, 4.7% had a male householder with no wife present, and 38.8% were non-families. 34.0% of all households were made up of individuals, and 15.8% had someone living alone who was 65 years of age or older. The average household size was 2.23 and the average family size was 2.84.

The median age in the city was 44 years. 20.7% of residents were under the age of 18; 7.5% were between the ages of 18 and 24; 23.1% were from 25 to 44; 30.5% were from 45 to 64; and 18.1% were 65 years of age or older. The gender makeup of the city was 46.9% male and 53.1% female.

=== 2000 census ===
As of the census of 2000, there were 5,676 people, 2,452 households, and 1,593 families living in the city. The population density was 3,014.6 inhabitants per square mile (1,163.9/km^{2}). There were 2,627 housing units at an average density of 1,395.2 per square mile (538.7/km^{2}). The racial makeup of the city was 97.60% White, 1.00% African American, 0.19% Native American, 0.21% Asian, 0.07% from other races, and 0.92% from two or more races. Hispanic or Latino of any race were 0.48% of the population.

There were 2,452 households, out of which 28.5% had children under the age of 18 living with them, 49.3% were married couples living together, 12.5% had a female householder with no husband present, and 35.0% were non-families. 31.3% of all households were made up of individuals, and 15.7% had someone living alone who was 65 years of age or older. The average household size was 2.31 and the average family size was 2.90.

In the city the age distribution of the population shows 22.8% under the age of 18, 8.0% from 18 to 24, 26.4% from 25 to 44, 24.9% from 45 to 64, and 17.9% who were 65 years of age or older. The median age was 41 years. For every 100 females, there were 85.0 males. For every 100 females age 18 and over, there were 80.9 males.

The median income for a household in the city was $30,905, and the median income for a family was $38,585. Males had a median income of $37,042 versus $19,405 for females. The per capita income for the city was $15,761. About 11.1% of families and 13.4% of the population were below the poverty line, including 22.2% of those under age 18 and 7.4% of those age 65 or over.

== Education ==
Public education in the city is provided by the Toronto City School District, which includes one elementary school and Toronto Junior/Senior High School. Toronto has a public library, a branch of the Public Library of Steubenville and Jefferson County.

== Notable people ==
- John Comer, football player for the Canton Bulldogs
- Clarke Hinkle, football player for the Green Bay Packers; Pro Football Hall of Fame inductee
- Gary A. Myers, member of the U.S. House of Representatives for Pennsylvania's 25th congressional district
- Bill Peterson, head football coach for Florida State Seminoles, Rice Owls, and the Houston Oilers
- Robert Urich, actor most known for the television shows Vega$ and Spenser: For Hire
- Bob Vogel, football player for the Baltimore Colts

== See also ==
- List of cities and towns along the Ohio River
