= Toronto Junior/Senior High School =

Location
- 1305 Dennis Way; Toronto, Ohio 43964; United States
- Coordinates: 40°28′24″N 80°35′57″W

Information
- Type: Public, Coeducational secondary school
- Motto: Respect the T!
- Established: 1888
- School district: Toronto City School District
- Superintendent: Maureen Taggert
- Grades: 6-12
- Enrollment: 388 (2022-23)
- Campus type: Small Suburb
- Colors: Red and white
- Fight song: Across the Field
- Athletics conference: Ohio Valley Athletic Conference
- Sports: Baseball, Basketball, Cheerleading, Football, Golf, Softball, Track and Field, Volleyball, and Wrestling.
- Nickname: Red Knights
- Rival: Catholic Central Crusaders
- Newspaper: The Mirror
- Yearbook: Torhisean
- Website: www.torontocsd.org/o/tjhs

Toronto Junior/Senior High School is a public secondary school in Toronto, Ohio, United States. It is the only secondary school in the Toronto City School District. Athletic teams compete as the Toronto Red Knights in the Ohio High School Athletic Association as a member of the Ohio Valley Athletic Conference.

== History ==
The first graduating class of Toronto High School was in 1889 with four students. In 1898 the first superintendent of schools, Mr. Abram Grove, organized what is known today as the Toronto Public School System. In 1905, Toronto High School was granted a charter as a First Grade High School and in 1918, the school was given membership in the North Central Association of Colleges and Secondary Schools. The current high school building was erected in 1926, and the latest addition, which provided for the library, cafeteria, the George J. Kunzler Memorial Gymnasium, and additional classrooms was dedicated in April 1940.

Presently, Toronto Junior/Senior High School holds grades K-12 with a new expansion opened in 2021 holding K-5.

== OHSAA State Championships ==
- Baseball – 1998
- Baseball – 2019
