= Indianapolis Capitols =

Defunct American football team

Logo

General information
- Founded: 1968
- Folded: 1979
- Stadium: Bush Stadium
- Headquartered: Indianapolis, Indiana

League / conference affiliations
- Continental Football League (1968–1969); Atlantic Coast Football League (1970); Midwest Football League (1972–1974, 1977–1978)

Championships
- League championships: 0; 3
- Division championships: 0 (1969, 1972, 1973)

The Indianapolis Capitols were a professional American football team based in Indianapolis, Indiana. They played in the Continental Football League from 1968 to 1969 and Midwest Football League from 1972 to 1974 and 1977 to 1978.

== History ==
The team was considered "an outgrowth" of the Indianapolis Warriors, which played in the United Football League from 1961 to 1964, moved to Fort Wayne, Indiana, to become the Fort Wayne Warriors in 1965 with the Continental Football League (CFL), and then moved again to Montreal to become the Montreal Beavers with the CFL from 1966 to 1967.

The Capitols started play in 1968 as members of the CFL and played their home games at Bush Stadium. The team won the COFL championship in 1969, the final season of the league. On April 4, 1970, with the future of the COFL uncertain, the Capitols moved to the rival Atlantic Coast Football League. The Capitols went 6–6 in 1970. After one season in the ACFL, Indianapolis announced that it was ceasing operations due to a lack of fan support and adequate playing facilities.

A reconstituted version of the Indianapolis Capitols started play in the Midwest Football League in 1972 as the Indiana Caps. The Caps won the MWL championship in 1972 after posting an 8–2 regular season record. The team changed its name to the Hoosier Caps in April 1973, then again in June to the Indy Caps. They had a farm team agreement with the Detroit Lions of the National Football League (NFL) for the 1973 season. They went 8–2 in 1973, and were named league champions after a coin toss to break a tie. Indy won the Capitol Division in 1974 with a record of 9–1, and lost in the championship game against the Flint Sabres, 15–2. The team withdrew from the MFL before the 1975 season.

Indianapolis returned to the MFL in 1977 as the Indy Superstars, coached by Percy Griffin. The team went 2–4 and finished in third place for the season. They changed their team name in 1978 to the Indy Kaps. They placed third in their division with a 6–4 record, and lost in the first round of the playoffs to the Kalamazoo All-Stars.

In 1979, the team joined the Northern States Football League.

== Season-by-season ==
Year	Team name	League	W	L	T	Finish	Coach
1968	Indianapolis Capitols	Continental Football League	8	4	0	1st	Bob Snyder
1969	Indianapolis Capitols	Continental Football League	8	4	0	1st	Ken Carpenter
1970	Indianapolis Capitols	Atlantic Coast Football League	6	6	0		Ken Carpenter
No team in 1971
1972	Indiana Caps	Midwest Football League	8	2	0	1st	Ken Carpenter
1973	Indy Caps	Midwest Football League	8	2	0	1st	Ken Carpenter
1974	Indy Caps	Midwest Football League	9	1	0	2nd	Ken Carpenter
No team from 1975 to 1976
1977	Indy Superstars	Midwest Football League	2	4	0	3rd	Percy Griffin
1978	Indy Kaps	Midwest Football League	6	4	0	3rd (Southern)	
