= Dayton Colts =

Former semi-professional American football team

- Established: 1946
- Folded: 1976
- Based in: Dayton, Ohio
- League: Inter-State Semipro Football League (1947); Tristate Semipro Football League (1953); American Football Conference (1959–1961); Midwest Football League (1963–1969, 1971–1973, 1975); Ohio–Pennsylvania Football League (1974)

Championships
- League titles (0): 3 (1968, 1971, 1974)
- Division titles (0): 1 (1971)

The Dayton Colts were a semi-professional American football team that played from 1946 to 1949 and 1953 to 1975. The team was based in Ohio. It competed in the Inter-State Semipro Football League in 1947 as the Dayton Rockets; Tristate Semipro Football League in 1953 and American Football Conference from 1959 to 1961 as the Dayton Triangles; Midwest Football League from 1963 to 1969, 1971 to 1973, and 1975 as the Cedarville Spartans, Dayton Colts, Columbus Bucks, and Columbus Barons; and Ohio–Pennsylvania Football League in 1974 as the Bellbrook Colts. It was also known as the John Stanko Barons and Wiedemann Buds in 1948 and 1949.

== History ==
=== Alex Rado iteration (1946–1949) ===
The Dayton Rockets fielded a team in 1946, coached by Alex Rado. They won the Dayton semi-pro city championship over the Dayton Bombers, 12–7. The team joined the Inter-State Semipro Football League in 1947. They won the city championship over the Bombers again by a score of 32–0. They were also known as Mickey's Rockets for the 1946 and 1947 seasons, due to a sponsorship with a local restaurant.

The team became the John Stanko Barons for the 1948 season, and played an independent schedule. Tony Furst joined the coaching staff as the line coach during the season. They went 7–1–1 in 1948 before playing in the city championship again opposite the Bombers, which they won for the third year in a row with a score of 30–6. Renamed the Wiedemann Buds, they played for the city championship against the Dayton Bombers again in 1949 and won their fourth title, 25–6.

=== Dayton Triangles (1953–1961) ===
The Dayton Rockets fielded a new team for the 1953 season under head coach Bob Puckett. The Rockets became the Dayton Triangle Rockets in October 1953 through an arrangement with a town bar called the Triangle Bar. The Triangles played in the Tristate Semipro Football League in 1953.

In 1954, the Dayton Triangles were coached by Bill Snyder, with Jack Lininger as an assistant coach. The team went 5–2 in 1955. John Pierce became head coach by 1956, and the team went 8–1 on the season.

The Triangles entered the Ohio Semi-Pro Football League for the 1957 season. Dayton was named league champion and the "mythical" Ohio semi-professional football champion in 1957 after defeating the Toledo All-Stars, 26–12. They also earned the mythical Midwest semi-professional football title after beating the St. Louis Raiders. They finished the season 12–0–1. Bill Lange was named line coach of the team in 1958, and they went 8–4 on the season.

Lange became head coach of the Triangles in June 1959. The Dayton Triangles played in the American Football Conference from 1959 to 1961. They joined the league in July 1959. The Triangles finished the season 3–5, placing third in the league standings. Don "Butch" Zimmerman became the head coach in August 1960, and they finished the season with an overall 7–7 record and 4–6 league record. Zimmerman was re-signed for the 1961 season, and the team finished last in the standings with a 3–7 record. The AFC dissolved before the 1962 season, and the Triangles played an independent schedule for the season. Ed McCracken became the head coach, with Zimmerman resigning to become the team's starting quarterback. They went 4–2–1 on the season.

=== Midwest Football League (1962–1975) ===
An application for a franchise from Dayton, Ohio, in the Midwest Football League was approved on March 11, 1962. The Spartan Athletic Club received approval to join the league in April 1963, and they initially chose a team name of Dayton Spartans. They were later called the Cedarville Spartans. The Spartans finished the 1963 season in second place with a 6–3–1 record, (Note: The Dayton Daily News reported the Cedarville Spartans' record for 1963 as 6–3–1, while Outsiders II stated they had a 5–2–2 record with a note about missing information.) and they won the Dayton city semi-professional football championship in a win over Hudson Bar, 7–6.

McCracken was elected league commissioner in March 1964. The Spartans became the Dayton Colts in 1964, and they had a $7,000 budget for the season. The team finished third in the league in 1964 with a 6–4–0 record. They defeated Hudson Bar after the season, 32–6, to win the Dayton semi-professional football championship for a second consecutive year.

Dayton was purchased by a new ownership group in 1965. The Colts had to cancel and forfeit a game against the Milan Vikings due to bad weather. Dayton scheduled the game to be played at a local high school football field, but the school would not allow the game to be played, citing a long-standing policy about wet fields. Dayton was placed a one-year probation by the league as punishment. Dayton went 5–2–1 in 1965, good for second in the league.

John Abel from Pontiac was named commissioner of the league in January 1966, replacing McCracken, who resigned to be the head coach for the Dayton Colts. The Dayton Colts played an exhibition game of basketball with the National Football League's Cleveland Browns in March 1966 as a fundraiser. Dayton went 6–4 in 1966 and placed third in the league. (Note: The Lansing State Journal reported the Dayton Colts' final record as 5–4–1, which would be the third tie in the standings. It is impossible for an odd-number of total ties to have occurred, and Outsiders II shows the Colts' record for 1966 as 6–4–0.)

In 1967, Dayton went 7–5 and placed fourth in the league.

The Dayton Colts were sold to Recreation Projects, Inc. in April 1968. The team went 12–0 during the season and were named league champions. McCracken resigned as head coach before the last game of the season, with defensive coach Danny Bilovecky taking over for the final game. In the all-star game on November 16, 1968, the Colts beat the team of league all-stars, 43–0. They were the first team in league history to go undefeated in a season after posting a 12–0 record.

Dayton went 10–4 in 1969, finishing second in the Lakes division.

The Dayton Colts were suspended for the season due to financial conditions, but fielded an independent team and played games against members of the league.

The Dayton Colts returned to the league in 1971, moved to Columbus, Ohio, in April, and became the Columbus Bucks. The league prevented players being paid salaries for 1971 after financial struggles the previous season. Bill Byrne, president of the Bucks, was elected vice president of the league in September 1971. The team was coached by Bobby Benjamin. The Bucks went 13–0–1 in the 1971 season and won the Lakes division. The Bucks were scheduled to play the second-place team in the Central Division, the Flint Wildcats, in the first round of the playoffs, but the opponent was replaced by the Michigan Barons due to eligibility concerns with Flint's roster. The Barons were made up of players from the Flint and Pontiac Firebirds rosters. In the divisional round of the playoffs, Columbus beat the Barons, 34–0, on November 6, 1971. On November 13, 1971, Columbus won the league championship with a win over Lansing, by a score of 20–17. After the championship game, Columbus played against the Pennsylvania Bruins of the Interstate League. The game was called the "Ohio Mini Super Bowl", with Columbus winning 44–13 in the November 20 game.

Benjamin returned as head coach in 1972, and the Bucks went 7–3 in 1972, finishing third in the league.

The Columbus Bucks became the Columbus Brewers before the 1973 season, and then later the Columbus Barons. Columbus had an agreement with the Cincinnati Bengals of the NFL to act as a farm team in 1973. By August 1973, the NFL had sent $11,000 to MFL teams during the season in exchange for being able to sign 11 of their players, including four from Columbus. Benjamin was coach again for 1973. The Barons went 3–7 in 1973, placing fourth. The team left the league before the start of the 1974 regular season, becoming the Bellbrook Colts and joining the Ohio–Pennsylvania Football League for 1974. They won the league championship after going 10–1 for the season.

The Dayton Colts were brought back to the league for the 1975 season. Dayton went 5–5 in 1975. The team folded before the 1976 season. Alumni of the Dayton Triangles and Colts held multiple reunions in the 1990s and 2000s.

=== Season-by-season ===
Year	Team name	League	W	L	T	Finish	Coach	Postseason results
1946	Dayton Rockets	Independent	No data available				Alex Rado	Dayton semipro city champions
1947	Dayton Rockets	Inter-State Semipro Football League	No data available				Alex Rado	Dayton semipro city champions
1948	John Stanko Barons	Independent	8	1	1	N/A	Alex Rado	Dayton semipro city champions
1949	Wiedemann Buds	Independent	No data available			N/A	Alex Rado	Dayton semipro city champions
No team from 1950 to 1952
1953	Dayton Triangles	Tristate Semipro Football League	No data available				Bob Puckett	
1954	Dayton Triangles	Independent	No data available				Bill Snyder	
1955	Dayton Triangles	Independent	5	2	0	N/A	No data available	
1956	Dayton Triangles	Independent	8	1	0	N/A	John Pierce	
1957	Dayton Triangles	Ohio Semi-Pro Football League	12	0	1	1st	John Pierce	League champions Ohio semi-pro champions Midwest semi-pro champions
1958	Dayton Triangles	Independent	8	4	0	N/A	John Pierce	
1959	Dayton Triangles	American Football Conference	3	5	0	3rd	Bill Lange	
1960	Dayton Triangles	American Football Conference	4	6	0	No data	Butch Zimmerman	
1961	Dayton Triangles	American Football Conference	3	7	0	T-6th	Butch Zimmerman	
1962	Dayton Triangles	Independent	4	2	1	N/A	Ed McCracken	
1963	Cedarville Spartans	Midwest Football League	6	3	1	2nd	Ed McCracken	Dayton semipro city champions
1964	Dayton Colts	Midwest Football League	6	4	0	3rd	Ed McCracken	Dayton semipro city champions
1965	Dayton Colts	Midwest Football League	5	2	1	2nd	Ed McCracken	
1966	Dayton Colts	Midwest Football League	6	4	0	3rd	Ed McCracken	
1967	Dayton Colts	Midwest Football League	7	5	0	4th	Ed McCracken	
1968	Dayton Colts	Midwest Football League	12	0	0	1st	Ed McCracken (resigned before final game); Danny Bilovecky (final game)	Midwest Football League champions
1969	Dayton Colts	Midwest Football League	10	4	0	2nd (Lakes)	Ed McCracken	
1970	Dayton Colts	Independent					Ed McCracken	
1971	Columbus Bucks	Midwest Football League	13	0	1	1st (Lakes)	Bobby Benjamin	
1972	Columbus Bucks	Midwest Football League	7	3	0	3rd	Bobby Benjamin	
1973	Columbus Barons	Midwest Football League	3	7	0	4th	Bobby Benjamin	
1974	Bellbrook Colts	Ohio–Pennsylvania Football League	10	1	0	1st	Ed McCracken	Ohio–Pennsylvania Football League champions
1975	Dayton Colts	Midwest Football League	5	5	0	2nd (Central)	Ed McCracken	

== Bibliography ==
- Gill, Bob; Maher, Tod; Brainerd, Steve (2010). Outsiders II: Minor League and Independent Football 1951–1985. St. Johann Press. ISBN 9781878282651.
