= 1999 Western Kentucky Hilltoppers football team =

American college football season

1999 Western Kentucky Hilltoppers football
- Conference: Ohio Valley Conference
- Record: 6–5 (4–3 OVC)
- Head coach: Jack Harbaugh (11th season)
- Home stadium: L. T. Smith Stadium

1999 Ohio Valley Conference football standings
	Conf.			Overall
Team	W		L	W		L
No. 11 Tennessee State $^	7	–	0	11	–	1
Murray State	5	–	2	7	–	4
Eastern Kentucky	4	–	3	7	–	4
Western Kentucky	4	–	3	6	–	5
Tennessee Tech	4	–	3	5	–	5
Southeast Missouri State	2	–	5	3	–	8
Eastern Illinois	2	–	5	2	–	10
Tennessee–Martin	0	–	7	1	–	10
$ – Conference champion; ^ – NCAA Division I-AA playoff participant; Rankings from The Sports Network poll

The 1999 Western Kentucky Hilltoppers football team represented Western Kentucky University in the 1999 NCAA Division I-AA football season and were led by head coach Jack Harbaugh. The Hilltoppers rejoined the Ohio Valley Conference as a football only member this year; the school left the OVC in 1982 and had been a football independent since. The team's roster included future NFL players Joseph Jefferson, Rod “He Hate Me” Smart, Sherrod Coates, Mel Mitchell, Bobby Sippio, and Ben Wittman, as well as future NFL coach Jason Michael. Patrick Goodman was named to the AP All American team. The All OVC Team included Goodman, Sippio, Smart, Melvin Wisham, Wittman and Mitchell.

== Schedule ==
Date	Opponent	Site	Result	Attendance	Source
September 2	at Tennessee–Martin	Graham Stadium; Martin, TN	W 34–10	5,632	
September 11	Cumberland (TN)*	L. T. Smith Stadium; Bowling Green, KY	W 55–7	7,350	
September 18	No. 21 South Florida*	L. T. Smith Stadium; Bowling Green, KY	L 6–21	7,500	
September 25	Southeast Missouri State	L. T. Smith Stadium; Bowling Green, KY	W 21–10	7,700	
October 2	Murray State	L. T. Smith Stadium; Bowling Green, KY (Battle for the Red Belt)	W 21–15	9,400	
October 9	at No. 16 Eastern Kentucky	Roy Kidd Stadium; Richmond, KY (Battle of the Bluegrass)	L 10–31	9,080	
October 16	at Tennessee Tech	Tucker Stadium; Cookeville, TN	L 10–23	4,024	
October 23	No. 2 Tennessee State^{†}	L. T. Smith Stadium; Bowling Green, KY	L 21–28	13,100	
October 30	at Eastern Illinois	O'Brien Field; Charleston, IL	W 38–15	1,082	
November 13	at Indiana State*	Memorial Stadium; Terre Haute, IN	W 40–34 ^{OT}	3,412	
November 20	at Southern Illinois*	McAndrew Stadium; Carbondale, IL	L 14–52	2,400	
*Non-conference game; ^{†}Homecoming; Rankings from The Sports Network Poll released prior to the game
