= 1999 Eastern Illinois Panthers football team =

American college football season

1999 Eastern Illinois Panthers football
- Conference: Ohio Valley Conference
- Record: 2–10 (2–5 OVC)
- Head coach: Bob Spoo (13th season)
- Offensive coordinator: Roy Wittke (10th season)
- Home stadium: O'Brien Field

1999 Ohio Valley Conference football standings
	Conf.			Overall
Team	W		L	W		L
No. 11 Tennessee State $^	7	–	0	11	–	1
Murray State	5	–	2	7	–	4
Eastern Kentucky	4	–	3	7	–	4
Western Kentucky	4	–	3	6	–	5
Tennessee Tech	4	–	3	5	–	5
Southeast Missouri State	2	–	5	3	–	8
Eastern Illinois	2	–	5	2	–	10
Tennessee–Martin	0	–	7	1	–	10
$ – Conference champion; ^ – NCAA Division I-AA playoff participant; Rankings from The Sports Network poll

The 1999 Eastern Illinois Panthers represented Eastern Illinois University as a member of the Ohio Valley Conference (OVC) during the 1999 NCAA Division I-AA football season. Led by 13th-year head coach Bob Spoo, the Panthers compiled an overall record of 2–10 and a mark of 2–5 in conference play, tying for sixth place in the OVC. The team played home game O'Brien Field in Charleston, Illinois.

== Schedule ==
Date	Opponent	Site	Result	Attendance	Source
September 2	at Central Michigan*	Kelly/Shorts Stadium; Mount Pleasant, MI	L 17–33	19,267	
September 11	at Hawaii*	Aloha Stadium; Halawa, HI	L 27–31	28,762	
September 18	Southern Illinois*	O'Brien Field; Charleston, IL	L 6–34	8,312	
September 25	Tennessee–Martin	O'Brien Field; Charleston, IL	W 42–21		
October 2	at UCF*	Florida Citrus Bowl; Orlando, FL	L 21–31	18,864	
October 9	at No. 5 Tennessee State	Adelphia Coliseum; Nashville, TN	L 25–43	4,184	
October 16	at Murray State	Roy Stewart Stadium; Murray, KY	L 32–37		
October 23	Tennessee Tech	O'Brien Field; Charleston, IL	L 7–14		
October 30	Western Kentucky	O'Brien Field; Charleston, IL	L 15–38	1,082	
November 6	at Southeast Missouri State	Houck Stadium; Cape Girardeau, MO	L 38–45		
November 13	No. 7 Illinois State*	O'Brien Field; Charleston, IL (rivalry)	L 17–24	3,033	
November 20	at Eastern Kentucky	Roy Kidd Stadium; Richmond, KY	W 20–14		
*Non-conference game; Rankings from The Sports Network Poll released prior to the game
