= 1999 La Salle Explorers football team =

American college football season

1999 La Salle Explorers football
- Conference: Metro Atlantic Athletic Conference
- Record: 4–6 (3–5 MAAC)
- Head coach: Bill Manlove (3rd season)
- Home stadium: McCarthy Stadium

1999 Metro Atlantic Athletic Conference football standings
| | Conf. | | | Overall |
| Team | W | | L | W | | L |
|---|---|---|---|---|---|---|
| Fairfield * | 7 | – | 1 | 9 | – | 2 |
| Georgetown | 7 | – | 1 | 9 | – | 2 |
| Duquesne $ | 6 | – | 2 | 8 | – | 3 |
| Marist | 5 | – | 3 | 6 | – | 5 |
| Iona | 4 | – | 4 | 5 | – | 5 |
| La Salle | 3 | – | 5 | 4 | – | 6 |
| Siena | 3 | – | 5 | 3 | – | 7 |
| Saint Peter's | 1 | – | 7 | 1 | – | 10 |
| Canisius | 0 | – | 8 | 1 | – | 10 |
+ – Conference co-champions; * – Fairfield was ineligible for conference title

The 1999 La Salle Explorers football team was an American football team that represented La Salle University as a member of the Metro Atlantic Athletic Conference (MAAC) during the 1999 NCAA Division I-AA football season. In their third year under head coach Bill Manlove, the Explorers compiled a 4–6 record.

== Schedule ==
| Date | Opponent | Site | Result | Attendance | Source |
|---|---|---|---|---|---|
| September 4 | Saint Francis (PA)* | McCarthy Stadium; Philadelphia, PA | W 44–7 | 2,500 | |
| September 11 | at Duquesne | Arthur J. Rooney Athletic Field; Pittsburgh, PA | L 3–32 | | |
| September 18 | Iona | McCarthy Stadium; Philadelphia, PA | L 23–31 | | |
| October 2 | at Siena | Heritage Park; Colonie, NY | W 17–7 | 850 | |
| October 9 | Canisius | McCarthy Stadium; Philadelphia, PA | W 19–6 | 4,719 | |
| October 16 | at Marist | Leonidoff Field; Poughkeepsie, NY | L 23–41 | 1,120 | |
| October 30 | St. John's* | McCarthy Stadium; Philadelphia, PA | L 10–21 | 1,875 | |
| November 6 | Saint Peter's | McCarthy Stadium; Philadelphia, PA | W 35–13 | | |
| November 13 | at Fairfield | Alumni Stadium; Fairfield, CT | L 0–42 | | |
| November 20 | at Georgetown | Kehoe Field; Washington, DC | L 7–52 | 2,189 | |
*Non-conference game
