= 1999 Delaware State Hornets football team =

American college football season

1999 Delaware State Hornets football
- Conference: Mid-Eastern Athletic Conference
- Record: 4–7 (4–4 MEAC)
- Head coach: John McKenzie (3rd season)
- Home stadium: Alumni Stadium

1999 Mid-Eastern Athletic Conference football standings
	Conf.			Overall
Team	W		L	W		L
No. 10 North Carolina A&T $^	8	–	0	11	–	2
No. 4 Florida A&M ^	7	–	1	11	–	4
Hampton	5	–	3	8	–	4
Bethune–Cookman	4	–	4	7	–	4
Howard	4	–	4	5	–	6
Delaware State	4	–	4	4	–	7
South Carolina State	2	–	5	4	–	6
Norfolk State	1	–	7	2	–	9
Morgan State	0	–	7	2	–	8
$ – Conference champion; ^ – NCAA Division I-AA playoff participant; Rankings from The Sports Network poll

The 1999 Delaware State Hornets football team represented Delaware State University as a member of the Mid-Eastern Athletic Conference (MEAC) during the 1999 NCAA Division I-AA football season. Led by third-year head coach John McKenzie, the Hornets compiled an overall record of 4–7, with a mark of 4–4 in conference play, and finished tied for fourth in the MEAC.

== Schedule ==
Date	Opponent	Site	Result	Attendance	Source
September 4	at No. 9 Hampton	Armstrong Stadium; Hampton, VA	L 0–21		
September 11	Elon*	Alumni Stadium; Dover, DE	L 28–51	1,324	
September 18	Norfolk State	Alumni Stadium; Dover, DE	W 26–6		
September 25	at Bucknell*	Christy Mathewson–Memorial Stadium; Lewisburg, PA	L 28–38	4,865	
October 2	Bethune–Cookman	Alumni Stadium; Dover, DE	W 43–29		
October 8	at No. 4 Hofstra*	Hofstra Stadium; Hempstead, NY	L 14–58		
October 23	Morgan State^{†}	Alumni Stadium; Dover, DE	W 34–20	4,321	
October 30	at No. 13 Florida A&M	Bragg Memorial Stadium; Tallahassee, FL	L 19–48	26,216	
November 6	at No. 24 North Carolina A&T	Aggie Stadium; Greensboro, NC	L 13–24	16,661	
November 13	at South Carolina State	Oliver C. Dawson Stadium; Orangeburg, SC	L 14–34	11,041	
November 20	Howard	Alumni Stadium; Dover, DE	W 42–25	4,187	
*Non-conference game; ^{†}Homecoming; Rankings from The Sports Network Poll released prior to the game
