= LaTraia Jones =

American football player and coach (born 1956)

Biographical details
- Born: February 11, 1956 (age 70); Houston, Texas, U.S.

Playing career
- 1975–1978: Wyoming
- Position: Running back

Coaching career (HC unless noted)
- 1999–2001: Mississippi Valley State
- 2003–2007: Alcorn State (DC)

Head coaching record
- Overall: 5–28

LaTraia Jones (born February 11, 1956) is an American former football player and coach. He was the 13th head football coach at Mississippi Valley State University located in Itta Bena, Mississippi and he held that position for three seasons, from 1999 until 2001. His coaching record at Mississippi Valley State was 5–28.

== Playing career and education ==
Jones was a four-year letterman as a running back at the University of Wyoming from 1975 to 1978 and was the Cowboys all-time rushing leader with 2,031 yards. He completed his bachelor's degree in 1986 at New Mexico State University in both Physical Education and Biology. He earned his master's degree in Educational Administration from NMSU in 1990.

== Coaching career ==
During a game against Jackson State University on September 22, 2001, a fight broke out on the field between players of both schools. Jones was reprimanded for the incident and both schools were fined. Jones finished the season at 0–11, a part of a fifteen-game losing streak and left the position after completing the season.

== Head coaching record ==
Year	Team	Overall	Conference	Standing	Bowl/playoffs
Mississippi Valley State Delta Devils (Southwestern Athletic Conference) (1999–2001)
1999	Mississippi Valley State	3–8	1–3	T–3rd (East)	
2000	Mississippi Valley State	2–9	1–6	4th (East)	
2001	Mississippi Valley State	0–11	0–7	5th (East)	
Mississippi Valley State:		5–28	2–16		
Total:		5–28			
