= 1999 Howard Bison football team =

American college football season

1999 Howard Bison football
- Conference: Mid-Eastern Athletic Conference
- Record: 5–6 (4–4 MEAC)
- Head coach: Steve Wilson (11th season)
- Home stadium: William H. Greene Stadium; RFK Stadium

1999 Mid-Eastern Athletic Conference football standings
| | Conf. | | | Overall |
| Team | W | | L | W | | L |
|---|---|---|---|---|---|---|
| No. 10 North Carolina A&T $^ | 8 | – | 0 | 11 | – | 2 |
| No. 4 Florida A&M ^ | 7 | – | 1 | 11 | – | 4 |
| Hampton | 5 | – | 3 | 8 | – | 4 |
| Bethune–Cookman | 4 | – | 4 | 7 | – | 4 |
| Howard | 4 | – | 4 | 5 | – | 6 |
| Delaware State | 4 | – | 4 | 4 | – | 7 |
| South Carolina State | 2 | – | 5 | 4 | – | 6 |
| Norfolk State | 1 | – | 7 | 2 | – | 9 |
| Morgan State | 0 | – | 7 | 2 | – | 8 |
$ – Conference champion; ^ – NCAA Division I-AA playoff participant; Rankings from The Sports Network poll

The 1999 Howard Bison football team represented Howard University as a member of the Mid-Eastern Athletic Conference (MEAC) during the 1999 NCAA Division I-AA football season. Led by 11th-year head coach Steve Wilson, the Bison compiled an overall record of 5–6, with a conference record of 4–4, and finished tied for fourth in the MEAC.

== Schedule ==
| Date | Opponent | Site | Result | Attendance | Source |
|---|---|---|---|---|---|
| September 4 | at No. 18 Jackson State* | Mississippi Veterans Memorial Stadium; Jackson, MS | L 21–35 | 11,000 | |
| September 11 | No. 7 Hampton | RFK Stadium; Washington, DC (rivalry) | L 27–28 | 26,300 | |
| September 18 | vs. Bethune–Cookman | Cinergy Field; Cincinnati, OH (River Front Classic & Jamboree) | W 31–27 | 21,812 | |
| September 25 | Texas Southern* | William H. Greene Stadium; Washington, DC | W 32–20 | 6,308 | |
| October 9 | No. 15 Florida A&M | William H. Greene Stadium; Washington, DC | L 34–40 ^{3OT} | 8,890 | |
| October 16 | Towson* | William H. Greene Stadium; Washington, DC | L 33–49 | 1,835 | |
| October 23 | at North Carolina A&T | Aggie Stadium; Greensboro, NC | L 0–51 | 28,793 | |
| October 30 | at Norfolk State | William "Dick" Price Stadium; Norfolk, VA | W 29–23 | | |
| November 6 | South Carolina State^{†} | William H. Greene Stadium; Washington, DC | W 49–42 | 18,756 | |
| November 13 | at Morgan State | Hughes Stadium; Baltimore, MD (rivalry) | W 42–38 | 8,115 | |
| November 20 | at Delaware State | Alumni Stadium; Dover, DE | L 25–42 | 4,187 | |
*Non-conference game; ^{†}Homecoming; Rankings from The Sports Network Poll released prior to the game
