= 1999 Bethune–Cookman Wildcats football team =

American college football season

1999 Bethune–Cookman Wildcats football
- Conference: Mid-Eastern Athletic Conference
- Record: 7–4 (4–4 MEAC)
- Head coach: Alvin Wyatt (3rd season)
- Home stadium: Municipal Stadium

1999 Mid-Eastern Athletic Conference football standings
	Conf.			Overall
Team	W		L	W		L
No. 10 North Carolina A&T $^	8	–	0	11	–	2
No. 4 Florida A&M ^	7	–	1	11	–	4
Hampton	5	–	3	8	–	4
Bethune–Cookman	4	–	4	7	–	4
Howard	4	–	4	5	–	6
Delaware State	4	–	4	4	–	7
South Carolina State	2	–	5	4	–	6
Norfolk State	1	–	7	2	–	9
Morgan State	0	–	7	2	–	8
$ – Conference champion; ^ – NCAA Division I-AA playoff participant; Rankings from The Sports Network poll

The 1999 Bethune–Cookman Wildcats football team represented Bethune–Cookman College (now known as Bethune–Cookman University) as a member of the Mid-Eastern Athletic Conference (MEAC) during the 1999 NCAA Division I-AA football season. Led by third-year head coach Alvin Wyatt, the Wildcats compiled an overall record of 7–4, with a mark of 4–4 in conference play, and finished tied for fourth in the MEAC.

== Schedule ==
Date	Opponent	Site	Result	Attendance	Source
September 4	vs. Savannah State*	Alltel Stadium; Jacksonville, FL	W 17–14		
September 11	Morgan State	Municipal Stadium; Daytona Beach, FL	W 28–25		
September 18	vs. Howard	Cinergy Field; Cincinnati, OH (River Front Classic & Jamboree)	L 27–31	21,812	
September 25	vs. Morris Brown*	Lockhart Stadium; Fort Lauderdale, FL (South Florida Football Classic)	W 28–16	11,624	
October 2	at Delaware State	Alumni Stadium; Dover, DE	L 29–43		
October 9	Johnson C. Smith*	Municipal Stadium; Daytona Beach, FL	W 26–6		
October 21	South Carolina State	Municipal Stadium; Daytona Beach, FL	W 30–27 ^{OT}	3,814	
October 30	No. 25 North Carolina A&T	Municipal Stadium; Daytona Beach, FL	L 18–19		
November 6	Hampton	Municipal Stadium; Daytona Beach, FL	W 34–27	6,245	
November 13	at Norfolk State	William "Dick" Price Stadium; Norfolk, VA	W 26–6		
November 20	vs. No. 15 Florida A&M	Florida Citrus Bowl; Orlando, FL (Florida Classic)	L 14–63	70,125	
*Non-conference game; Rankings from The Sports Network Poll released prior to the game
