= Clifton Gilliard =

American football player, coach, and administrator (1938–2017)

Biographical details
- Born: March 17, 1938; Shreveport, Louisiana, U.S.
- Died: June 20, 2017 (aged 79); Waller County, Texas, U.S.

Playing career

Football
- 1957–1959: Prairie View A&M
- Position: Halfback

Coaching career (HC unless noted)

Football
- 1999: Prairie View A&M

Administrative career (AD unless noted)
- 1996–1998: Prairie View

Head coaching record
- Overall: 2–8 (football)

Clifton Gilliard (March 17, 1938 – June 20, 2017) was an American football player, coach, and college athletics administrator. He has served the head football coach, head men's track and field and cross country coach, and interim athletic director at Prairie View A&M University. Clifton Gilliard was inducted into the Prairie View A&M University Hall of Fame in 1994 and Texas Black Sports Hall of Fame in 2013.[1]

== Playing career ==
Gilliard played football at Prairie View as a halfback. He was a three-year letterman and played for Prairie View's 1958 national championship team under Billy Nicks, and was named all-conference that same year.

== Coaching career ==
=== Football ===
Gilliard was the 20th head football coach at Prairie View A&M University in Prairie View, Texas, a position he held during the 1999 season. His record at Prairie View was 2–8. He coached his only son Reginald "Bo" Gilliard at Prairie View A&M who was pick up by the New England Patriots in 1993. Bo Gilliard played 6 years of professional football.

=== Track and field, cross country ===
Gilliard was a track and field coach at Prairie View. In 2007 and 2008, he was named Men's Indoor and Outdoor Track and Field Coach of the Year. 2006 Cross Country Coach of the YearSouthwestern Athletic Conference.

== Head coaching record ==
=== Football ===
Year	Team	Overall	Conference	Standing	Bowl/playoffs
Prairie View A&M Panthers (Southwestern Athletic Conference) (1999)
1999	Prairie View A&M	2–8	0–4	5th (West)	
Prairie View A&M:		2–8	0–4		
Total:		2–8			
