= 1999 Norfolk State Spartans football team =

American college football season

1999 Norfolk State Spartans football
- Conference: Mid-Eastern Athletic Conference
- Record: 2–9 (1–7 MEAC)
- Head coach: Mo Forte (1st season)
- Home stadium: William "Dick" Price Stadium

1999 Mid-Eastern Athletic Conference football standings
	Conf.			Overall
Team	W		L	W		L
No. 10 North Carolina A&T $^	8	–	0	11	–	2
No. 4 Florida A&M ^	7	–	1	11	–	4
Hampton	5	–	3	8	–	4
Bethune–Cookman	4	–	4	7	–	4
Howard	4	–	4	5	–	6
Delaware State	4	–	4	4	–	7
South Carolina State	2	–	5	4	–	6
Norfolk State	1	–	7	2	–	9
Morgan State	0	–	7	2	–	8
$ – Conference champion; ^ – NCAA Division I-AA playoff participant; Rankings from The Sports Network poll

The 1999 Norfolk State Spartans football team represented Norfolk State University as a member of the Mid-Eastern Athletic Conference (MEAC) during the 1999 NCAA Division I-AA football season. Led by first-year head coach Mo Forte, the Spartans compiled an overall record of 2–9, with a conference record of 1–7, and finished eighth in the MEAC.

== Schedule ==
Date	Opponent	Site	Result	Attendance	Source
September 4	Virginia State*	William "Dick" Price Stadium; Norfolk, VA	W 19–7	1,749	
September 11	at No. 13 Florida A&M	Bragg Memorial Stadium; Tallahassee, FL	L 7–56	12,902	
September 18	at Delaware State	Alumni Stadium; Dover, DE	L 6–26		
October 2	North Carolina A&T	William "Dick" Price Stadium; Norfolk, VA	L 14–28		
October 9	at South Carolina State	Oliver C. Dawson Stadium; Orangeburg, SC	L 23–27		
October 16	No. 22 Hampton	William "Dick" Price Stadium; Norfolk, VA (rivalry)	L 27–28	10,232	
October 23	at Virginia Union*	Hovey Field; Richmond, VA	L 9–21	8,822	
October 30	Howard	William "Dick" Price Stadium; Norfolk, VA	L 23–29		
November 6	Morgan State	William "Dick" Price Stadium; Norfolk, VA	W 20–16		
November 13	Bethune–Cookman	William "Dick" Price Stadium; Norfolk, VA	L 6–26		
November 20	at Texas Southern*	Robertson Stadium; Houston, TX	L 6–22	3,222	
*Non-conference game; Rankings from The Sports Network Poll released prior to the game
