= 1999 Maine Black Bears football team =

American college football season

1999 Maine Black Bears football
- Conference: Atlantic 10 Conference
- New England Division
- Record: 4–7 (3–5 A-10)
- Head coach: Jack Cosgrove (7th season)
- Offensive coordinator: Joe Gilbert (4th season)
- Defensive coordinator: Neil McGrath (5th season)
- Captains: Ves Lugo; Brent Naccara; Jojo Oliphant
- Home stadium: Alfond Stadium

1999 Atlantic 10 Conference football standings
	Conf.			Overall
Team	W		L	W		L
No. 13 James Madison +^	7	–	1	8	–	4
No. 7 UMass +^	7	–	1	9	–	4
No. 24 Villanova	6	–	2	7	–	4
Delaware	5	–	3	7	–	4
William & Mary	5	–	3	6	–	5
Connecticut	3	–	5	4	–	7
Maine	3	–	5	4	–	7
New Hampshire	3	–	5	5	–	6
Richmond	3	–	5	5	–	6
Northeastern	1	–	7	2	–	9
Rhode Island	1	–	7	1	–	10
+ – Conference co-champions; ^ – NCAA Division I-AA playoff participant; Rankings from The Sports Network poll

The 1999 Maine Black Bears football team represented the University of Maine in the 1999 NCAA Division I-AA football season. They played their home games at Alfond Stadium as a member of the Atlantic 10 Conference. They were led by seventh-year head coach Jack Cosgrove. The Black Bears finished the season 4–7, 3–5 in conference play, to finish tied for sixth in the Atlantic 10.

== Schedule ==
Date	Opponent	Site	Result	Attendance	Source
September 4	at Colgate*	Andy Kerr Stadium; Hamilton, NY	L 21–28	6,006	
September 11	No. 6 Hofstra*	Alfond Stadium; Orono, ME	L 19–27	9,050	
September 18	No. 19 Richmond	Alfond Stadium; Orono, ME	W 21–14	5,139	
September 25	Connecticut	Alfond Stadium; Orono, ME	L 20–34	6,113	
October 2	McNeese State*	Alfond Stadium; Orono, ME	W 35–7	3,943	
October 16	No. 25 UMass	Alfond Stadium; Orono, ME	L 17–38	6,874	
October 23	at Rhode Island	Meade Stadium; Kingston, RI	L 14–23	4,458	
October 30	at William & Mary	Zable Stadium; Williamsburg, VA	L 13–37	9,358	
November 6	No. 8 James Madison	Alfond Stadium; Orono, ME	W 26–20	2,297	
November 13	at Northeastern	Parsons Field; Brookline, MA	W 20–14	2,092	
November 20	at New Hampshire	Cowell Field; Durham, NH (Battle for the Brice-Cowell Musket)	L 20–31	3,864	
*Non-conference game; Rankings from The Sports Network Poll released prior to the game
