= 1999 Arkansas–Pine Bluff Golden Lions football team =

American college football season

1999 Arkansas–Pine Bluff Golden Lions football
- Conference: Southwestern Athletic Conference
- West Division
- Record: 6–5 (1–3 SWAC)
- Head coach: Lee Hardman (7th season)
- Home stadium: Pumphrey Stadium; War Memorial Stadium

1999 Southwestern Athletic Conference football standings
	Conf.			Overall
Team	W		L	W		L
East Division
No. 19 Jackson State xy	4	–	0	9	–	3
Alabama A&M	3	–	1	6	–	5
Alcorn State	1	–	3	3	–	7
Mississippi Valley State	1	–	3	3	–	8
Alabama State	1	–	3	2	–	9
West Division
No. 17 Southern xy$	4	–	0	11	–	2
Texas Southern	3	–	1	6	–	5
Grambling State	2	–	2	7	–	4
Arkansas–Pine Bluff	1	–	3	6	–	5
Prairie View A&M	0	–	4	2	–	8
Championship: Southern 31, Jackson State 30
$ – Conference champion; x – Division champion/co-champions; y – Championship game participant; Rankings from The Sports Network Poll

The 1999 Arkansas–Pine Bluff Golden Lions football team represented the University of Arkansas at Pine Bluff as a member of the Southwestern Athletic Conference (SWAC) during the 1999 NCAA Division I-AA football season. Led by seventh-year head coach Lee Hardman, the Golden Lions compiled an overall record of 6–5, with a mark of 1–3 in conference play, and finished fourth in the SWAC West Division.

== Schedule ==
Date	Opponent	Site	Result	Attendance	Source
September 4	Mississippi Valley State*	War Memorial Stadium; Little Rock, AR	W 13–9	15,800	
September 11	at No. 11 Southern	A. W. Mumford Stadium; Baton Rouge, LA	L 9–17	24,000	
September 18	vs. Hampton*	Trans World Dome; St. Louis, MO (Gateway Classic)	L 13–26	33,400	
September 25	Alcorn State*	War Memorial Stadium; Little Rock, AR	W 33–17	10,589	
October 9	Texas Southern	War Memorial Stadium; Little Rock, AR	L 7–20		
October 16	Alabama State*	Pumphrey Stadium; Pine Bluff, AR	W 35–21	4,237	
October 23	vs. Grambling State	Independence Stadium; Shreveport, LA (Red River Classic)	L 19–24	20,170	
October 30	at No. 18 Jackson State*	Mississippi Veterans Memorial Stadium; Jackson, MS	L 0–41	25,000	
November 6	at Prairie View A&M	Edward L. Blackshear Field; Prairie View, TX	W 30–6	9,756	
November 13	Lane*	Pumphrey Stadium; Pine Bluff, AR	W 44–28	9,500	
November 20	at Alabama A&M*	Louis Crews Stadium; Normal, AL	W 23–17	4,065	
*Non-conference game; Rankings from The Sports Network Poll released prior to the game
