= 1999 Alabama A&M Bulldogs football team =

American college football season

1999 Alabama A&M Bulldogs football
- Conference: Southwestern Athletic Conference
- East Division
- Record: 6–5 (3–1 SWAC)
- Head coach: Ron Cooper (2nd season)
- Defensive coordinator: Sal Sunseri (2nd season)
- Home stadium: Louis Crews Stadium

1999 Southwestern Athletic Conference football standings
	Conf.			Overall
Team	W		L	W		L
East Division
No. 19 Jackson State xy	4	–	0	9	–	3
Alabama A&M	3	–	1	6	–	5
Alcorn State	1	–	3	3	–	7
Mississippi Valley State	1	–	3	3	–	8
Alabama State	1	–	3	2	–	9
West Division
No. 17 Southern xy$	4	–	0	11	–	2
Texas Southern	3	–	1	6	–	5
Grambling State	2	–	2	7	–	4
Arkansas–Pine Bluff	1	–	3	6	–	5
Prairie View A&M	0	–	4	2	–	8
Championship: Southern 31, Jackson State 30
$ – Conference champion; x – Division champion/co-champions; y – Championship game participant; Rankings from The Sports Network Poll

The 1999 Alabama A&M Bulldogs football team represented Alabama A&M University as a member of the Southwestern Athletic Conference (SWAC) during the 1999 NCAA Division I-AA football season. Led by second-year head coach Ron Cooper, the Bulldogs compiled an overall record of 6–5, with a conference record of 3–1, and finished second in the SWAC East Division.

== Schedule ==
Date	Opponent	Site	Result	Attendance	Source
September 4	at Jacksonville State*	Paul Snow Stadium; Jacksonville, AL	W 37–20	16,773	
September 11	at Grambling State*	Eddie G. Robinson Memorial Stadium; Grambling, LA	L 31–36	7,586	
September 18	at Mississippi Valley State	Magnolia Stadium; Itta Bena, MS	W 26–19	4,760	
September 25	Prairie View A&M*	Louis Crews Stadium; Normal, AL	W 27–3	8,514	
October 2	Tennessee State*	Louis Crews Stadium; Normal, AL	L 12–36		
October 9	at No. 6 Southern*	A. W. Mumford Stadium; Baton Rouge, LA	L 12–29	25,718	
October 16	Tuskegee*	Louis Crews Stadium; Normal, AL	W 54–0	16,233	
October 23	No. 22 Jackson State	Louis Crews Stadium; Normal, AL	L 18–28	6,451	
October 30	vs. Alabama State	Legion Field; Birmingham, AL (Magic City Classic)	W 15–10	51,337	
November 13	at Alcorn State	Jack Spinks Stadium; Lorman, MS	W 35–26	1,342	
November 20	Arkansas–Pine Bluff*	Louis Crews Stadium; Normal, AL	L 17–23	4,065	
*Non-conference game; Rankings from The Sports Network Poll released prior to the game
