= 1999 Grambling State Tigers football team =

American college football season

1999 Grambling State Tigers football
- Conference: Southwestern Athletic Conference
- West Division
- Record: 7–4 (2–2 SWAC)
- Head coach: Doug Williams (2nd season)
- Offensive coordinator: Melvin Spears (2nd season)
- Home stadium: Eddie G. Robinson Memorial Stadium

1999 Southwestern Athletic Conference football standings
	Conf.			Overall
Team	W		L	W		L
East Division
No. 19 Jackson State xy	4	–	0	9	–	3
Alabama A&M	3	–	1	6	–	5
Alcorn State	1	–	3	3	–	7
Mississippi Valley State	1	–	3	3	–	8
Alabama State	1	–	3	2	–	9
West Division
No. 17 Southern xy$	4	–	0	11	–	2
Texas Southern	3	–	1	6	–	5
Grambling State	2	–	2	7	–	4
Arkansas–Pine Bluff	1	–	3	6	–	5
Prairie View A&M	0	–	4	2	–	8
Championship: Southern 31, Jackson State 30
$ – Conference champion; x – Division champion/co-champions; y – Championship game participant; Rankings from The Sports Network Poll

The 1999 Grambling State Tigers football team represented Grambling State University as a member of the West Division of the Southwestern Athletic Conference (SWAC) during the 1999 NCAA Division I-AA football season. Led by second year head coach Doug Williams, the Tigers compiled an overall record of 7–4 and a mark of 2–2 in conference play, and finished third in the SWAC West Division.

== Schedule ==
Date	Opponent	Site	Result	Attendance	Source
September 4	vs. Alcorn State	Soldier Field; Chicago, IL (Chicago Football Classic)	W 41–25	18,070	
September 11	Alabama A&M	Eddie G. Robinson Memorial Stadium; Grambling, LA	W 36–31	7,586	
September 18	at Jackson State	Mississippi Veterans Memorial Stadium; Jackson, MS	L 6–31	19,600	
September 25	vs. Hampton*	Giants Stadium; East Rutherford, NJ (Whitney Young Memorial Classic)	L 7–27	41,074	
October 2	vs. Prairie View A&M	Cotton Bowl; Dallas, TX (rivalry)	W 47–19	51,439	
October 9	Mississippi Valley State	Eddie G. Robinson Memorial Stadium; Grambling, LA	W 42–19	4,965	
October 23	vs. Arkansas–Pine Bluff	Independence Stadium; Shreveport, LA (Red River Classic)	W 24–19	20,170	
October 30	Texas Southern	Eddie G. Robinson Memorial Stadium; Grambling, LA	L 20–21	14,776	
November 6	at Alabama State	Cramton Bowl; Montgomery, AL	W 36–13	4,278	
November 13	vs. Winston-Salem State*	Qualcomm Stadium; San Diego, CA (Gold Coast Classic)	W 25–23	12,000	
November 27	vs. Southern	Louisiana Superdome; New Orleans, LA (Bayou Classic)	L 31–37	67,641	
*Non-conference game
