= 1999 South Carolina State Bulldogs football team =

American college football season

1999 South Carolina State Bulldogs football
- Conference: Mid-Eastern Athletic Conference
- Record: 4–6 (2–5 MEAC)
- Head coach: Willie Jeffries (17th season)
- Home stadium: Oliver C. Dawson Stadium

1999 Mid-Eastern Athletic Conference football standings
	Conf.			Overall
Team	W		L	W		L
No. 10 North Carolina A&T $^	8	–	0	11	–	2
No. 4 Florida A&M ^	7	–	1	11	–	4
Hampton	5	–	3	8	–	4
Bethune–Cookman	4	–	4	7	–	4
Howard	4	–	4	5	–	6
Delaware State	4	–	4	4	–	7
South Carolina State	2	–	5	4	–	6
Norfolk State	1	–	7	2	–	9
Morgan State	0	–	7	2	–	8
$ – Conference champion; ^ – NCAA Division I-AA playoff participant; Rankings from The Sports Network poll

The 1999 South Carolina State Bulldogs football team represented South Carolina State University as a member of the Mid-Eastern Athletic Conference (MEAC) during the 1999 NCAA Division I-AA football season. Led by 17th-year head coach Willie Jeffries, the Bulldogs compiled an overall record of 4–6, with a mark of 2–5 in conference play, and finished seventh in the MEAC.

== Schedule ==
Date	Opponent	Site	Result	Attendance	Source
September 4	Charleston Southern*	Oliver C. Dawson Stadium; Orangeburg, SC	W 20–14		
September 11	Benedict*	Oliver C. Dawson Stadium; Orangeburg, SC	W 26–23		
September 18	at Morgan State	Hughes Stadium; Baltimore, MD	Canceled (Note: The game against Morgan State scheduled for September 18 was canceled due to the impacts of Hurricane Floyd.)	N/A	
September 25	vs. No. 19 Florida A&M	Alltel Stadium; Jacksonville, FL (Orange Blossom–Palmetto Classic)	L 17–76	20,542	
October 2	at The Citadel*	Johnson Hagood Stadium; Charleston, SC	L 14–20	17,239	
October 9	Norfolk State	Oliver C. Dawson Stadium; Orangeburg, SC	W 27–23		
October 21	at Bethune–Cookman	Municipal Stadium; Daytona Beach, FL	L 27–30 ^{OT}	3,814	
October 30	at Hampton	Armstrong Stadium; Hampton, VA	L 27–39		
November 6	at Howard	William H. Greene Stadium; Washington, DC	L 42–49	18,756	
November 13	Delaware State	Oliver C. Dawson Stadium; Orangeburg, SC	W 34–14	11,041	
November 20	vs. No. 16 North Carolina A&T	Ericsson Stadium; Charlotte, NC (Carolinas Classic, rivalry)	L 7–27	26,862	
*Non-conference game; Rankings from The Sports Network Poll released prior to the game
