= 1999 Mississippi Valley State Delta Devils football team =

American college football season

1999 Mississippi Valley State Delta Devils football
- Conference: Southwestern Athletic Conference
- East Division
- Record: 3–8 (1–3 SWAC)
- Head coach: LaTraia Jones (1st season)
- Home stadium: Magnolia Stadium

1999 Southwestern Athletic Conference football standings
| | Conf. | | | Overall |
| Team | W | | L | W | | L |
|---|---|---|---|---|---|---|
East Division
| No. 19 Jackson State xy | 4 | – | 0 | 9 | – | 3 |
| Alabama A&M | 3 | – | 1 | 6 | – | 5 |
| Alcorn State | 1 | – | 3 | 3 | – | 7 |
| Mississippi Valley State | 1 | – | 3 | 3 | – | 8 |
| Alabama State | 1 | – | 3 | 2 | – | 9 |
West Division
| No. 17 Southern xy$ | 4 | – | 0 | 11 | – | 2 |
| Texas Southern | 3 | – | 1 | 6 | – | 5 |
| Grambling State | 2 | – | 2 | 7 | – | 4 |
| Arkansas–Pine Bluff | 1 | – | 3 | 6 | – | 5 |
| Prairie View A&M | 0 | – | 4 | 2 | – | 8 |
Championship: Southern 31, Jackson State 30
$ – Conference champion; x – Division champion/co-champions; y – Championship game participant; Rankings from The Sports Network Poll

The 1999 Mississippi Valley State Delta Devils football team represented Mississippi Valley State University as a member of the Southwestern Athletic Conference (SWAC) during the 1999 NCAA Division I-AA football season. Led by first-year head coach LaTraia Jones, the Delta Devils compiled an overall record of 3–8, with a conference record of 1–3, and finished tied for third in the SWAC East Division.

== Schedule ==
| Date | Opponent | Site | Result | Attendance | Source |
|---|---|---|---|---|---|
| September 4 | at Arkansas–Pine Bluff* | War Memorial Stadium; Little Rock, AR | L 9–13 | 15,800 | |
| September 11 | at No. 18 Western Illinois* | Hanson Field; Macomb, IL | L 7–77 | 7,324 | |
| September 18 | Alabama A&M | Magnolia Stadium; Itta Bena, MS | L 19–26 | 4,760 | |
| September 27 | at No. 21 Jackson State | Mississippi Veterans Memorial Stadium; Jackson, MS | L 0–63 | 19,521 | |
| October 2 | Alabama State | Magnolia Stadium; Itta Bena, MS | L 27–35 | 3,827 | |
| October 9 | at Grambling State* | Eddie G. Robinson Memorial Stadium; Grambling, LA | L 19–42 | 4,965 | |
| October 16 | at Albany State* | Hugh Mills Stadium; Albany, GA | L 8–46 | 5,211 | |
| October 30 | Texas Southern* | Magnolia Stadium; Itta Bena, MS | W 18–13 | 7,652 | |
| November 1 | at Prairie View A&M* | Edward L. Blackshear Field; Prairie View, TX | W 14–12 | 2,896 | |
| November 6 | at Alcorn State | Jack Spinks Stadium; Lorman, MS | W 30–26 | 8,750 | |
| November 13 | Morris Brown* | Magnolia Stadium; Itta Bena, MS | L 19–20 | 5,000 | |
*Non-conference game; Rankings from The Sports Network Poll released prior to the game
