= 1999 NCAA Division I-AA Football Championship Game =

College football game

1999 NCAA Division I-AA Football Championship
- I-AA National Championship Game
Georgia Southern Eagles	Youngstown State Penguins
(12–2)	(12–2)
SoCon	Gateway
59	24
Head coach: Paul Johnson	Head coach: Jim Tressel
TSN / Seed; 2 / 2	TSN / Seed; 9 / 9
	1	2	3	4	Total
Georgia Southern	10	28	7	14	59
Youngstown State	7	7	3	7	24
- Date: December 18, 1999
- Season: 1999
- Stadium: Finley Stadium
- Location: Chattanooga, Tennessee
- Referee: Art Bellows (Atlantic 10)
- Attendance: 20,052

United States TV coverage
- Network: ESPN
- Announcers: Rich Waltz (play-by-play), Rod Gilmore (color), Don McPherson (sideline)

The 1999 NCAA Division I-AA Football Championship Game was a postseason college football game between the Georgia Southern Eagles and the Youngstown State Penguins. The game was played on December 18, 1999, at Finley Stadium, home field of the University of Tennessee at Chattanooga. The culminating game of the 1999 NCAA Division I-AA football season, it was won by Georgia Southern, 59–24.

== Teams ==
The participants of the Championship Game were the finalists of the 1999 I-AA Playoffs, which began with a 16-team bracket.

=== Youngstown State Penguins ===
Youngstown State finished their regular season with a 9–2 record (5–1 in conference); one of their losses had been to Western Michigan of Division I-A. Seeded ninth in the playoffs, the Penguins defeated eighth-seed Montana, 16-seed North Carolina A&T, and 13-seed Florida A&M to reach the final. This was the sixth appearance for Youngstown State in a Division I-AA championship game, having won four titles (1991, 1993, 1994, and 1997) against one loss (1992).

=== Georgia Southern Eagles ===
Georgia Southern finished their regular season with a 9–2 record (7–1 in conference); one of their losses had been to Oregon State of Division I-A. The Eagles, seeded second, defeated 15-seed Northern Arizona, 10-seed UMass, and sixth-seed Illinois State to reach the final. This was the seventh appearance for Georgia Southern in a Division I-AA championship game, having four prior wins (1985, 1986, 1989, 1990) and two prior losses (1988, 1998).

== Game summary ==
=== Scoring summary ===
Scoring summary

Quarter	Time	Drive			Team	Scoring information	Score	
Quarter	Time	Plays	Yards	TOP	Team	Scoring information	GSU	YSU
1	10:20	9	44	4:40	GSU	25-yard field goal by Chris Chambers	3	0
1	4:51	11	76	5:29	YSU	Adrian Brown 2-yard touchdown run, Mark Griffith kick good	3	7
1	2:51	5	72	2:00	GSU	Greg Hill 42-yard touchdown run, Chambers kick good	10	7
2	14:34	8	73	3:17	YSU	Jeff Ryan 3-yard touchdown run, Griffith kick good	10	14
2	10:25	11	78	4:09	GSU	Adrian Peterson 3-yard touchdown run, Chambers kick good	17	14
2	9:05	1	57	0:10	GSU	Bennie Cunningham 57-yard touchdown run, Chambers kick good	24	14
2	5:27	2	72	0:40	GSU	Peterson 22-yard touchdown run, Chambers kick good	31	14
2	2:09				GSU	Punt returned 72 yards for touchdown by Anthony Williams, Chambers kick good	38	14
3	4:47	5	41	1:15	YSU	30-yard field goal by Griffith	38	17
3	3:05	5	66	1:42	GSU	Peterson 1-yard touchdown run, Chambers kick good	45	17
4	9:57	10	90	4:34	GSU	Mark Myers 5-yard touchdown run, Chambers kick good	52	17
4	7:13	2	71	1:11	GSU	J. R. Revere 66-yard touchdown run, Chambers kick good	59	17
4	3:48	8	71	3:25	YSU	Brown 1-yard touchdown run, Griffith kick good	59	24
"TOP" = time of possession. For other American football terms, see Glossary of American football.							59	24

=== Game statistics ===
	1	2	3	4	Total
No. 2 Eagles	10	28	7	14	59
No. 9 Penguins	7	7	3	7	24

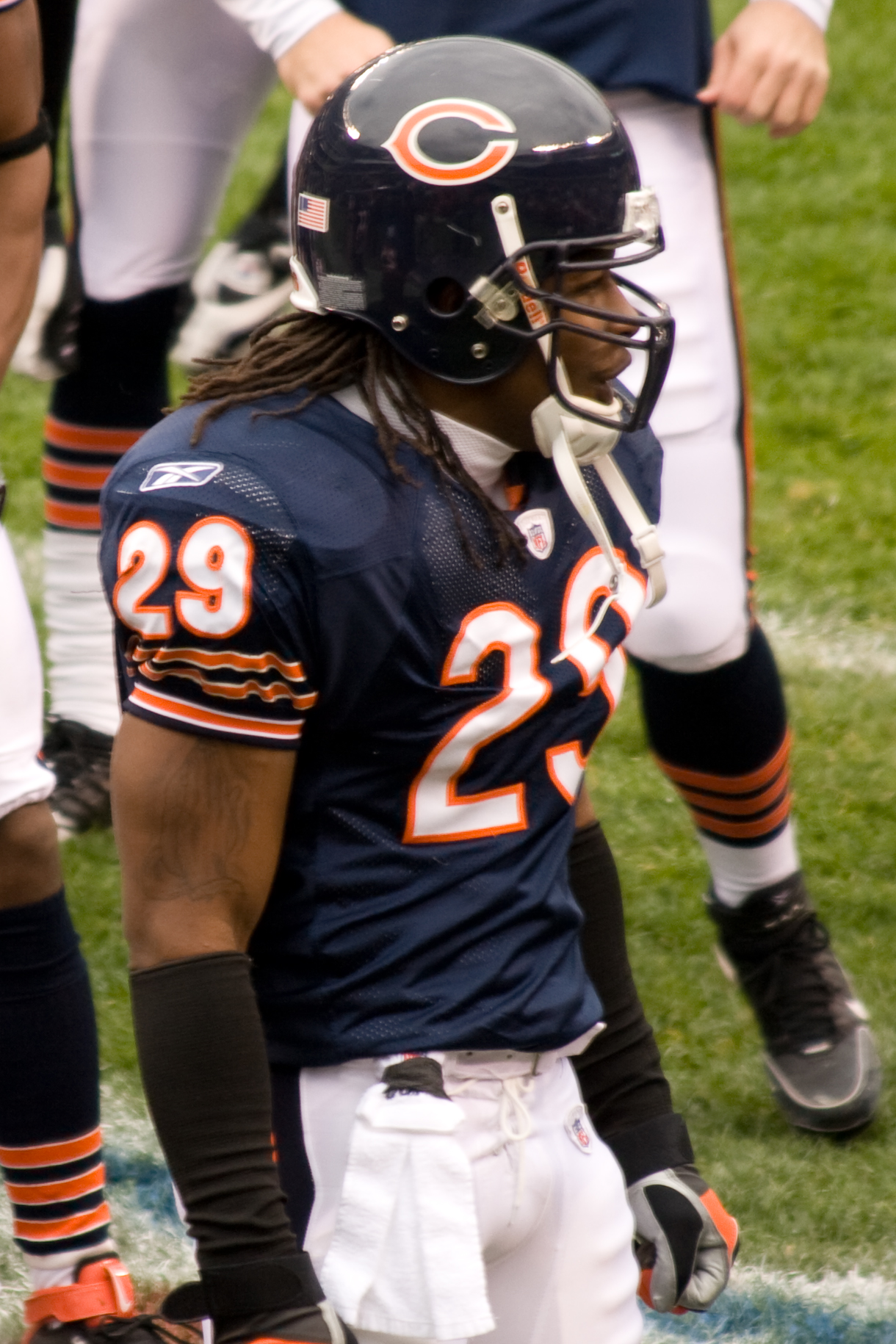
Georgia Southern running back Adrian Peterson

Statistics	GSU	YSU
First downs	24	17
Plays–yards	63–655	64–338
Rushes–yards	59–638	44–163
Passing yards	17	175
Passing: comp–att–int	1–4–0	11–20–1
Turnovers		
Time of possession	27:47	32:13

Team	Category	Player	Statistics
Georgia Southern	Passing	Greg Hill	1–4, 17 yds
Georgia Southern	Rushing	Adrian Peterson	25 car, 247 yds, 3 TD
Georgia Southern	Receiving	Dedric Parham	1 rec, 17 yds
Youngstown State	Passing	Jeff Ryan	11–20, 175 yds, 1 INT
Youngstown State	Rushing	Adrian Brown	22 car, 160 yds, 2 TD
Youngstown State	Receiving	Renauld Ray	4 rec, 90 yds
