= 1999 Alcorn State Braves football team =

American college football season

1999 Alcorn State Braves football
- Conference: Southwestern Athletic Conference
- East Division
- Record: 3–7 (1–3 SWAC)
- Head coach: Johnny Thomas (2nd season)
- Home stadium: Jack Spinks Stadium

1999 Southwestern Athletic Conference football standings
| | Conf. | | | Overall |
| Team | W | | L | W | | L |
|---|---|---|---|---|---|---|
East Division
| No. 19 Jackson State xy | 4 | – | 0 | 9 | – | 3 |
| Alabama A&M | 3 | – | 1 | 6 | – | 5 |
| Alcorn State | 1 | – | 3 | 3 | – | 7 |
| Mississippi Valley State | 1 | – | 3 | 3 | – | 8 |
| Alabama State | 1 | – | 3 | 2 | – | 9 |
West Division
| No. 17 Southern xy$ | 4 | – | 0 | 11 | – | 2 |
| Texas Southern | 3 | – | 1 | 6 | – | 5 |
| Grambling State | 2 | – | 2 | 7 | – | 4 |
| Arkansas–Pine Bluff | 1 | – | 3 | 6 | – | 5 |
| Prairie View A&M | 0 | – | 4 | 2 | – | 8 |
Championship: Southern 31, Jackson State 30
$ – Conference champion; x – Division champion/co-champions; y – Championship game participant; Rankings from The Sports Network Poll

The 1999 Alcorn State Braves football team represented Alcorn State University as a member of the Southwestern Athletic Conference (SWAC) during the 1999 NCAA Division I-AA football season. Led by second-year head coach Johnny Thomas, the Braves compiled an overall record of 3–7, with a conference record of 1–3, and finished tied for third in the SWAC East Division.

== Schedule ==
| Date | Opponent | Site | Result | Attendance | Source |
|---|---|---|---|---|---|
| September 4 | vs. Grambling State* | Soldier Field; Chicago, IL (Chicago Football Classic) | L 25–41 | 18,070 | |
| September 11 | at Alabama State | Cramton Bowl; Montgomery, AL | W 38–27 | 16,482 | |
| September 25 | at Arkansas–Pine Bluff* | War Memorial Stadium; Little Rock, AR | L 17–33 | 10,589 | |
| October 2 | Morehouse* | Jack Spinks Stadium; Lorman, MS | W 41–27 | 14,500 | |
| October 9 | Prairie View A&M* | Jack Spinks Stadium; Lorman, MS | W 61–0 | 16,500 | |
| October 16 | at Texas Southern* | Robertson Stadium; Houston, TX | L 21–23 | 12,890 | |
| October 23 | at No. 3 Southern* | A. W. Mumford Stadium; Baton Rouge, LA | L 6–28 | 27,012 | |
| November 6 | Mississippi Valley State | Jack Spinks Stadium; Lorman, MS | L 26–30 | 8,750 | |
| November 13 | Alabama A&M | Jack Spinks Stadium; Lorman, MS | L 26–35 | 1,342 | |
| November 20 | at No. 12 Jackson State | Mississippi Veterans Memorial Stadium; Jackson, MS (Capital City Classic) | L 6–58 | 52,500 | |
*Non-conference game; Rankings from The Sports Network Poll released prior to the game
