= 1999 Alabama State Hornets football team =

American college football season

1999 Alabama State Hornets football
- Conference: Southwestern Athletic Conference
- East Division
- Record: 2–9 (1–3 SWAC)
- Head coach: Ron Dickerson (2nd season)
- Home stadium: Cramton Bowl

1999 Southwestern Athletic Conference football standings
	Conf.			Overall
Team	W		L	W		L
East Division
No. 19 Jackson State xy	4	–	0	9	–	3
Alabama A&M	3	–	1	6	–	5
Alcorn State	1	–	3	3	–	7
Mississippi Valley State	1	–	3	3	–	8
Alabama State	1	–	3	2	–	9
West Division
No. 17 Southern xy$	4	–	0	11	–	2
Texas Southern	3	–	1	6	–	5
Grambling State	2	–	2	7	–	4
Arkansas–Pine Bluff	1	–	3	6	–	5
Prairie View A&M	0	–	4	2	–	8
Championship: Southern 31, Jackson State 30
$ – Conference champion; x – Division champion/co-champions; y – Championship game participant; Rankings from The Sports Network Poll

The 1999 Alabama State Hornets football team represented Alabama State University as a member of the Southwestern Athletic Conference (SWAC) during the 1999 NCAA Division I-AA football season. Led by second-year head coach Ron Dickerson, the Hornets compiled an overall record of 2–9, with a mark of 1–3 in conference play, and finished tied for third in the East Division of the SWAC.

== Schedule ==
Date	Opponent	Site	Result	Attendance	Source
September 5	at No. 8 Tennessee State*	Adelphia Coliseum; Nashville, TN	L 8–41	31,119	
September 11	Alcorn State	Cramton Bowl; Montgomery, AL	L 27–38	16,482	
September 18	No. 8 Troy State*	Cramton Bowl; Montgomery, AL	L 20–27	18,107	
September 25	vs. Southern*	Ladd–Peebles Stadium; Mobile, AL (Gulf Coast Classic)	L 13–36	36,612	
October 2	at Mississippi Valley State	Magnolia Stadium; Itta Bena, MS	W 35–27	3,827	
October 9	at Jackson State	Mississippi Veterans Memorial Stadium; Jackson, MS	L 17–44	10,500	
October 16	at Arkansas–Pine Bluff*	Pumphrey Stadium; Pine Bluff, AR	L 21–35	4,237	
October 30	vs. Alabama A&M	Legion Field; Birmingham, AL (Magic City Classic)	L 10–15	51,337	
November 6	Grambling State*	Cramton Bowl; Montgomery, AL	L 13–36	4,278	
November 13	Prairie View A&M*	Cramton Bowl; Montgomery, AL	W 42–27	6,837	
November 25	Tuskegee*	Cramton Bowl; Montgomery, AL (Turkey Day Classic)	L 34–37	21,438	
*Non-conference game; Rankings from The Sports Network Poll released prior to the game
