= 1999 New Hampshire Wildcats football team =

American college football season

1999 New Hampshire Wildcats football
- Conference: Atlantic 10 Conference
- Record: 5–6 (3–5 A-10)
- Head coach: Sean McDonnell (1st season)
- Offensive coordinator: Chip Kelly (1st season)
- Home stadium: Cowell Stadium

1999 Atlantic 10 Conference football standings
	Conf.			Overall
Team	W		L	W		L
No. 13 James Madison +^	7	–	1	8	–	4
No. 7 UMass +^	7	–	1	9	–	4
No. 24 Villanova	6	–	2	7	–	4
Delaware	5	–	3	7	–	4
William & Mary	5	–	3	6	–	5
Connecticut	3	–	5	4	–	7
Maine	3	–	5	4	–	7
New Hampshire	3	–	5	5	–	6
Richmond	3	–	5	5	–	6
Northeastern	1	–	7	2	–	9
Rhode Island	1	–	7	1	–	10
+ – Conference co-champions; ^ – NCAA Division I-AA playoff participant; Rankings from The Sports Network poll

The 1999 New Hampshire Wildcats football team was an American football team that represented the University of New Hampshire as a member of the Atlantic 10 Conference during the 1999 NCAA Division I-AA football season. In its first year under head coach Sean McDonnell, the team compiled a 5–6 record (3–5 against conference opponents) and finished in a tie for sixth place in the Atlantic 10 Conference.

== Schedule ==
Date	Opponent	Site	Result	Attendance	Source
September 4	at Rhode Island	Meade Stadium; Kingston, RI	W 37–14	2,419	
September 11	at No. 2 UMass	McGuirk Stadium; Hadley, MA (rivalry)	L 19–34	14,120	
September 18	James Madison	Cowell Stadium; Durham, NH	L 28–35	4,594	
September 25	at Richmond	University of Richmond Stadium; Richmond, VA	L 17–27	14,484	
October 2	Stephen F. Austin*	Cowell Stadium; Durham, NH	W 38–28	5,010	
October 16	at Northeastern*	Parsons Field; Brookline, MA	W 33–21		
October 23	at No. 17 South Florida*	Raymond James Stadium; Tampa, FL	L 41–42 ^{OT}	24,004	
October 30	No. 21 Villanova	Cowell Stadium; Durham, NH	L 28–31	4,974	
November 6	No. 25 Delaware	Cowell Stadium; Durham, NH	L 10–14		
November 13	at Connecticut	Memorial Stadium; Storrs, CT	W 43–18	7,286	
November 20	Maine	Cowell Stadium; Durham, NH (Battle for the Brice–Cowell Musket)	W 31–20	3,864	
*Non-conference game; Rankings from The Sports Network Poll released prior to the game
