= 1999 Rhode Island Rams football team =

American college football season

1999 Rhode Island Rams football
- Conference: Atlantic 10 Conference
- Record: 1–10 (1–7 A-10)
- Head coach: Floyd Keith (7th season)
- Defensive coordinator: Pat Narduzzi (2nd season)
- Home stadium: Meade Stadium

1999 Atlantic 10 Conference football standings
	Conf.			Overall
Team	W		L	W		L
No. 13 James Madison +^	7	–	1	8	–	4
No. 7 UMass +^	7	–	1	9	–	4
No. 24 Villanova	6	–	2	7	–	4
Delaware	5	–	3	7	–	4
William & Mary	5	–	3	6	–	5
Connecticut	3	–	5	4	–	7
Maine	3	–	5	4	–	7
New Hampshire	3	–	5	5	–	6
Richmond	3	–	5	5	–	6
Northeastern	1	–	7	2	–	9
Rhode Island	1	–	7	1	–	10
+ – Conference co-champions; ^ – NCAA Division I-AA playoff participant; Rankings from The Sports Network poll

The 1999 Rhode Island Rams football team was an American football team that represented the University of Rhode Island in the Atlantic 10 Conference during the 1999 NCAA Division I-AA football season. In their seventh and last season under head coach Floyd Keith, the Rams compiled a 1–10 record (1–7 against conference opponents) and tied for last place in the New England Division of the conference.

== Schedule ==
Date	Opponent	Site	Result	Attendance	Source
September 4	New Hampshire	Meade Stadium; Kingston, RI	L 14–37	2,419	
September 18	No. 7 Hofstra*	Meade Stadium; Kingston, RI	L 13–28	2,691	
September 25	Morgan State*	Meade Stadium; Kingston, RI	L 21–24	2,067	
October 2	at Connecticut	Memorial Stadium; Storrs, CT (rivalry)	L 9–20	11,769	
October 9	at Richmond	University of Richmond Stadium; Richmond, VA	L 38–41	5,179	
October 16	at Brown*	Brown Stadium; Providence, RI (rivalry)	L 25–27	7,032	
October 23	Maine^{†}	Meade Stadium; Kingston, RI	W 23–14	4,458	
October 30	at No. 20 UMass	McGuirk Stadium; Hadley, MA	L 9–31	13,879	
November 6	William & Mary	Meade Stadium; Kingston, RI	L 6–24	6,130	
November 13	at No. 24 Delaware	Delaware Stadium; Newark, DE	L 0–35	17,227	
November 20	Northeastern	Meade Stadium; Kingston, RI	L 10–20	2,398	
*Non-conference game; ^{†}Homecoming; Rankings from The Sports Network Poll released prior to the game
