= 1999 Prairie View A&M Panthers football team =

American college football season

1999 Prairie View A&M Panthers football
- Conference: Southwestern Athletic Conference
- West Division
- Record: 2–8 (0–4 SWAC)
- Head coach: Clifton Gilliard (1st season)
- Home stadium: Edward L. Blackshear Field

1999 Southwestern Athletic Conference football standings
	Conf.			Overall
Team	W		L	W		L
East Division
No. 19 Jackson State xy	4	–	0	9	–	3
Alabama A&M	3	–	1	6	–	5
Alcorn State	1	–	3	3	–	7
Mississippi Valley State	1	–	3	3	–	8
Alabama State	1	–	3	2	–	9
West Division
No. 17 Southern xy$	4	–	0	11	–	2
Texas Southern	3	–	1	6	–	5
Grambling State	2	–	2	7	–	4
Arkansas–Pine Bluff	1	–	3	6	–	5
Prairie View A&M	0	–	4	2	–	8
Championship: Southern 31, Jackson State 30
$ – Conference champion; x – Division champion/co-champions; y – Championship game participant; Rankings from The Sports Network Poll

The 1999 Prairie View A&M Panthers football team represented Prairie View A&M University as a member of the Southwestern Athletic Conference (SWAC) during the 1999 NCAA Division I-AA football season. Led by first-year head coach Clifton Gilliard, the Panthers compiled an overall record of 2–8, with a mark of 0–4 in conference play, and finished fifth in the SWAC West Division.

== Schedule ==
Date	Opponent	Site	Result	Attendance	Source
September 4	at Texas Southern	Astrodome; Houston, TX (Labor Day Classic)	L 0–34	26,993	
September 11	Howard Payne*	Edward L. Blackshear Field; Prairie View, TX	W 21–7	7,000	
September 18	at No. 11 Southern	A. W. Mumford Stadium; Baton Rouge, LA	L 0–42	24,751	
September 25	at Alabama A&M*	Louis Crews Stadium; Normal, AL	L 3–27	8,514	
October 2	vs. Grambling State	Cotton Bowl; Dallas, TX (rivalry)	L 19–47	51,439	
October 9	at Alcorn State*	Jack Spinks Stadium; Lorman, MS	L 0–61	16,500	
October 23	Oklahoma Panhandle State*	Edward L. Blackshear Field; Prairie View, TX	W 21–20	3,129	
October 30	Mississippi Valley State*	Edward L. Blackshear Field; Prairie View, TX	L 12–14	7,652	
November 6	Arkansas–Pine Bluff	Edward L. Blackshear Field; Prairie View, TX	L 6–30	9,756	
November 13	at Alabama State*	Cramton Bowl; Montgomery, AL	L 27–42	6,837	
*Non-conference game; Rankings from The Sports Network Poll released prior to the game
