= 1999 Texas Southern Tigers football team =

American college football season

1999 Texas Southern Tigers football
- Conference: Southwestern Athletic Conference
- West Division
- Record: 6–5 (3–1 SWAC)
- Head coach: William A. Thomas (6th season)
- Home stadium: Astrodome; Robertson Stadium

1999 Southwestern Athletic Conference football standings
	Conf.			Overall
Team	W		L	W		L
East Division
No. 19 Jackson State xy	4	–	0	9	–	3
Alabama A&M	3	–	1	6	–	5
Alcorn State	1	–	3	3	–	7
Mississippi Valley State	1	–	3	3	–	8
Alabama State	1	–	3	2	–	9
West Division
No. 17 Southern xy$	4	–	0	11	–	2
Texas Southern	3	–	1	6	–	5
Grambling State	2	–	2	7	–	4
Arkansas–Pine Bluff	1	–	3	6	–	5
Prairie View A&M	0	–	4	2	–	8
Championship: Southern 31, Jackson State 30
$ – Conference champion; x – Division champion/co-champions; y – Championship game participant; Rankings from The Sports Network Poll

The 1999 Texas Southern Tigers football team represented Texas Southern University as a member of the Southwestern Athletic Conference (SWAC) during the 1999 NCAA Division I-AA football season. Led by sixth-year head coach William A. Thomas, the Tigers compiled an overall record of 6–5, with a mark of 3–1 in conference play, and finished second in the West Division of the SWAC.

== Schedule ==
Date	Opponent	Site	Result	Attendance	Source
September 4	Prairie View A&M	Astrodome; Houston, TX (Labor Day Classic)	W 34–0	26,993	
September 11	at Southwest Missouri State*	Plaster Sports Complex; Springfield, MO	L 7–37	13,121	
September 18	vs. Lane*	Cardinal Stadium; Beaumont, TX	W 38–15	4,500	
September 25	at Howard*	William H. Greene Stadium; Washington, DC	L 20–32	6,308	
October 9	at Arkansas–Pine Bluff	War Memorial Stadium; Little Rock, AR	W 20–7		
October 16	Alcorn State*	Robertson Stadium; Houston, TX	W 23–21	12,890	
October 23	at Mississippi Valley State*	Magnolia Stadium; Itta Bena, MS	L 13–18	7,652	
October 30	at Grambling State	Eddie G. Robinson Memorial Stadium; Grambling, LA	W 21–20	14,776	
November 6	No. 16 Jackson State	Robertson Stadium; Houston, TX	L 24–41	16,385	
November 13	No. 12 Southern	Astrodome; Houston, TX	L 14–23	33,004	
November 20	Norfolk State*	Robertson Stadium; Houston, TX	W 22–6	3,222	
*Non-conference game; Rankings from The Sports Network Poll released prior to the game
