= Bill Manlove =

American football coach

Biographical details
- Born: February 5, 1933 (age 93); Barrington, New Jersey, U.S.

Coaching career (HC unless noted)
- 1957–1959: Gloucester City JS (NJ) (assistant)
- 1960–1964: Gloucester City JS (NJ)
- 1965–1966: Oakcrest HS (NJ)
- 1967–1968: Lafayette (assistant)
- 1969–1991: PMC/Widener
- 1992–1995: Delaware Valley
- 1997–2001: La Salle

Head coaching record
- Overall: 212–111–1 (college)
- Tournaments: 9–5 (NCAA D-III playoffs)

Accomplishments and honors

Championships
- 2 NCAA Division III (1977, 1981); 3 MAC (1984, 1987–1988); 7 MAC Southern Division (1975, 1977–1982)
- College Football Hall of Fame; Inducted in 2011 (profile)

William B. Manlove Jr. (born February 5, 1933) is an American former football coach. He served as the head football coach at Widener University from 1969 to 1991, at Delaware Valley College from 1992 to 1995, and at La Salle University from 1997 to 2001, compiling a career college football coaching record of 212–111–1. Manlove led Widener to two NCAA Division III Football Championships, in 1977 and 1981. He served as president of the American Football Coaches Association (AFCA) in 1991. He was inducted into the College Football Hall of Fame in 2011.

== Early life ==
Manlove was born in Barrington, New Jersey, and graduated from Haddon Heights High School in 1951. After serving in the United States Army, he received a Bachelor of Science in education in 1958 and a master's degree in 1960 from Temple University.

== Coaching career ==
Manlove was an assistant coach at Gloucester City Junior-Senior High School in Gloucester City, New Jersey from 1957 to 1959 and was head coach from 1960 to 1965. He was head coach at Oakcrest High School from 1965 to 1966. In 1967 and 1968 he was assistant coach at Lafayette College.

In 1969 Manlove began as head coach at Widener University, then called PMC Colleges. He had a 2–7 record the first season, but never had a losing season again at Widener. He accumulated a 182–53–1 record in 22 seasons and won two Division III national titles and 10 Middle Atlantic Conference titles. Manlove was named Division III Coach of the Year in 1977.

In 2006 and 2007 he coached the U.S. team in the Aztec Bowl, winning both games. In 2009 he was inducted into The Pennsylvania Sports Hall of Fame.

== Head coaching record ==
=== College ===
| Year | Team | Overall | Conference | Standing | Bowl/playoffs |
|---|---|---|---|---|---|
Pennsylvania Military Cadets / Widener Pioneers (Middle Atlantic Conference) (1969–1991)
| 1969 | Pennsylvania Military | 2–7 | 1–6 | T–9th (Southern College) | |
| 1970 | Pennsylvania Military | 5–4 | 4–3 | 6th (Southern) | |
| 1971 | Pennsylvania Military | 7–3 | 4–3 | T–6th (Southern) | |
| 1972 | Widener | 8–1 | 6–1 | 2nd (Southern) | |
| 1973 | Widener | 8–1 | 7–1 | 2nd (Southern) | |
| 1974 | Widener | 8–1 | 7–1 | 2nd (Southern) | |
| 1975 | Widener | 10–1 | 8–0 | 1st (Southern) | L NCAA Division III Semifinal |
| 1976 | Widener | 8–1 | 6–1 | 2nd (Southern) | |
| 1977 | Widener | 11–1 | 6–0 | 1st (Southern) | W NCAA Division III Championship |
| 1978 | Widener | 8–1 | 5–1 | 1st (Southern) | |
| 1979 | Widener | 10–1 | 8–0 | 1st (Southern) | L NCAA Division III Semifinal |
| 1980 | Widener | 11–1 | 8–0 | 1st (Southern) | L NCAA Division III Semifinal |
| 1981 | Widener | 13–0 | 8–0 | 1st (Southern) | W NCAA Division III Championship |
| 1982 | Widener | 9–2 | 7–1 | 1st (Southern) | L NCAA Division III Quarterfinal |
| 1983 | Widener | 7–3 | 6–2 | 3rd | |
| 1984 | Widener | 8–3 | 7–1 | 1st | |
| 1985 | Widener | 7–3 | 6–3 | T–3rd | |
| 1986 | Widener | 7–4 | 6–3 | T–4th | |
| 1987 | Widener | 8–2 | 7–2 | T–1st | |
| 1988 | Widener | 9–3 | 7–1 | T–1st | L NCAA Division III First Round |
| 1989 | Widener | 8–2 | 6–2 | T–3rd | |
| 1990 | Widener | 7–2–1 | 6–2 | T–2nd | |
| 1991 | Widener | 3–7 | 2–6 | 8th | |
| Pennsylvania Military / Widener: | | 182–54–1 | 138–40 | | |
Delaware Valley Aggies (Middle Atlantic Conference) (1992–1995)
| 1992 | Delaware Valley | 3–7 | 2–6 | 8th | |
| 1993 | Delaware Valley | 2–8 | 2–3 | 4th (Freedom) | |
| 1994 | Delaware Valley | 2–7 | 1–3 | T–4th (Freedom) | |
| 1995 | Delaware Valley | 3–7 | 1–3 | T–4th (Freedom) | |
| Delaware Valley: | | 10–29 | 6–15 | | |
La Salle Explorers (NCAA Division I-AA independent) (1997–1998)
| 1997 | La Salle | 1–8 | | | |
| 1998 | La Salle | 3–6 | | | |
La Salle Explorers (Metro Atlantic Athletic Conference) (1999–2001)
| 1999 | La Salle | 4–6 | 3–4 | T–5th | |
| 2000 | La Salle | 7–4 | 4–3 | 5th | |
| 2001 | La Salle | 5–4 | 2–4 | T–5th | |
| La Salle: | | 20–28 | 9–11 | | |
| Total: | | 212–111–1 | | | |
National championship Conference title Conference division title or championship game berth

== See also ==
- List of college football career coaching wins leaders
- List of presidents of the American Football Coaches Association
