= 1999 Morgan State Bears football team =

American college football season

1999 Morgan State Bears football
- Conference: Mid-Eastern Athletic Conference
- Record: 2–8 (0–7 MEAC)
- Head coach: Stanley Mitchell (1st season)
- Home stadium: Hughes Stadium; PSINet Stadium

1999 Mid-Eastern Athletic Conference football standings
	Conf.			Overall
Team	W		L	W		L
No. 10 North Carolina A&T $^	8	–	0	11	–	2
No. 4 Florida A&M ^	7	–	1	11	–	4
Hampton	5	–	3	8	–	4
Bethune–Cookman	4	–	4	7	–	4
Howard	4	–	4	5	–	6
Delaware State	4	–	4	4	–	7
South Carolina State	2	–	5	4	–	6
Norfolk State	1	–	7	2	–	9
Morgan State	0	–	7	2	–	8
$ – Conference champion; ^ – NCAA Division I-AA playoff participant; Rankings from The Sports Network poll

The 1999 Morgan State Bears football team represented Morgan State University as a member of the Mid-Eastern Athletic Conference (MEAC) during the 1999 NCAA Division I-AA football season. Led by first-year head coach Stanley Mitchell, the Bears compiled an overall record of 2–8, with a mark of 0–7 in conference play, and finished ninth in the MEAC.

== Schedule ==
Date	Opponent	Site	Result	Attendance	Source
September 4	at Bucknell*	Christy Mathewson–Memorial Stadium; Lewisburg, PA	L 10–37	2,194	
September 11	at Bethune–Cookman	Municipal Stadium; Daytona Beach, FL	L 25–28		
September 18	South Carolina State	Hughes Stadium; Baltimore, MD	Canceled (Note: The game against Morgan State scheduled for September 18 was canceled due to the impacts of Hurricane Floyd.)	N/A	
September 25	at Rhode Island*	Meade Stadium; Kingston, RI	W 24–21	2,067	
October 2	at No. 18 Florida A&M	Bragg Memorial Stadium; Tallahassee, FL	L 10–66	15,478	
October 9	vs. Towson*	Homewood Field; Baltimore, MD (rivalry)	W 28–22		
October 16	North Carolina A&T	PSINet Stadium; Baltimore, MD	L 6–30	22,147	
October 23	at Delaware State	Alumni Stadium; Dover, DE	L 20–34	4,321	
November 6	at Norfolk State	William "Dick" Price Stadium; Norfolk, VA	L 16–20		
November 13	Howard	Hughes Stadium; Baltimore, MD (rivalry)	L 38–42	8,115	
November 20	at Hampton	Armstrong Stadium; Hampton, VA	L 14–34		
*Non-conference game; Rankings from The Sports Network Poll released prior to the game
