= 1999 James Madison Dukes football team =

American college football season

1999 James Madison Dukes football

A-10 co-champion

NCAA Division I-AA First Round, L 7–27 at Troy State
- Conference: Atlantic 10 Conference
- Mid-Atlantic Division

Ranking
- Sports Network: No. 13
- Record: 8–4 (7–1 A-10)
- Head coach: Mickey Matthews (1st season)
- Offensive coordinator: John Zernhelt (1st season)
- Defensive coordinator: Dick Hopkins (1st season)
- Home stadium: Bridgeforth Stadium

1999 Atlantic 10 Conference football standings
	Conf.			Overall
Team	W		L	W		L
No. 13 James Madison +^	7	–	1	8	–	4
No. 7 UMass +^	7	–	1	9	–	4
No. 24 Villanova	6	–	2	7	–	4
Delaware	5	–	3	7	–	4
William & Mary	5	–	3	6	–	5
Connecticut	3	–	5	4	–	7
Maine	3	–	5	4	–	7
New Hampshire	3	–	5	5	–	6
Richmond	3	–	5	5	–	6
Northeastern	1	–	7	2	–	9
Rhode Island	1	–	7	1	–	10
+ – Conference co-champions; ^ – NCAA Division I-AA playoff participant; Rankings from The Sports Network poll

The 1999 James Madison Dukes football team represented James Madison University (JMU) during the 1999 NCAA Division I-AA football season. It was the program's 28th season and they finished as Atlantic 10 Conference (A-10) co-champions with UMass after posting a 7–1 record in conference play. The Dukes earned a berth as the #12 seed into the 16-team Division I-AA playoffs, but lost in the first round to #5 seed Troy State, 7–27. JMU was led by first-year head coach Mickey Matthews.

== Schedule ==
Date	Time	Opponent	Rank	Site	TV	Result	Attendance	Source
September 4	1:00 p.m.	at No. 11 (I-A) Virginia Tech*		Lane Stadium; Blacksburg, VA		L 0–47	51,907	
September 11	6:00 p.m.	Northeastern		Bridgeforth Stadium; Harrisonburg, VA		W 29–21	10,200	
September 18	12:00 p.m.	at New Hampshire		Wildcat Stadium; Durham, NH		W 35–28	4,594	
September 25	6:00 p.m.	No. 7 Delaware		Bridgeforth Stadium; Harrisonburg, VA (rivalry)		W 21–7	10,200	
October 2	1:00 p.m.	at No. 11 Villanova	No. 22	Villanova Stadium; Villanova, PA		W 23–20	12,546	
October 16	1:00 p.m.	at William & Mary	No. 13	Zable Stadium; Williamsburg, VA (rivalry)		W 30–20	9,225	
October 23	3:00 p.m.	Connecticut^{†}	No. 11	Bridgeforth Stadium; Harrisonburg, VA		W 48–14	12,500	
October 30	1:30 p.m.	No. 16 South Florida*	No. 10	Bridgeforth Stadium; Harrisonburg, VA	SCF	W 13–3	15,000	
November 6	1:00 p.m.	at Maine	No. 8	Alfond Stadium; Orono, ME		L 20–26	2,297	
November 13	12:00 p.m.	at Richmond	No. 14	University of Richmond Stadium; Richmond, VA (rivalry)		W 31–13	11,500	
November 20	12:00 p.m.	at No. 4 Hofstra		James M. Shuart Stadium; Hempstead, NY		L 16–34	6,842	
November 27	1:20 p.m.	at No. 6 Troy State*	No. 13	Veterans Memorial Stadium; Troy, AL (NCAA Division I-AA First Round)		L 7–27	17,102	
*Non-conference game; ^{†}Homecoming; Rankings from The Sports Network Poll released prior to the game; All times are in Eastern time

== Awards and honors ==
- First Team All-America – Curtis Keaton (AFCA)
- Second Team All-America – Curtis Keaton (Associated Press, The Sports Network); Chris Morant (The Sports Network); Derick Pack (Associated Press)
- Third Team All-America – Derick Pack (The Sports Network)
- First Team All-Atlantic 10 – Ron Atkins, Delvin Joyce, Curtis Keaton, Mike Luckie, Chris Morant, Derick Pack, Dee Shropshire
- Second Team All-Atlantic 10 – Jason Inskee, Jason Parme
- Third Team All-Atlantic 10 – Ulrick Edmond, Mike Glover
- Atlantic 10 Defensive Player of the Year – Chris Morant
- Atlantic 10 Offensive Player of the Year – Curtis Keaton
- Eddie Robinson Award – Mickey Matthews
