= 1999 North Carolina A&T Aggies football team =

American college football season

1999 North Carolina A&T Aggies football

Black college national champion MEAC champion

NCAA Division I-AA Quarterfinal, L 3–41 vs. Youngstown State
- Conference: Mid-Eastern Athletic Conference

Ranking
- Sports Network: No. 10
- Record: 11–2 (8–0 MEAC)
- Head coach: Bill Hayes (11th season)
- Home stadium: Aggie Stadium

1999 Mid-Eastern Athletic Conference football standings
	Conf.			Overall
Team	W		L	W		L
No. 10 North Carolina A&T $^	8	–	0	11	–	2
No. 4 Florida A&M ^	7	–	1	11	–	4
Hampton	5	–	3	8	–	4
Bethune–Cookman	4	–	4	7	–	4
Howard	4	–	4	5	–	6
Delaware State	4	–	4	4	–	7
South Carolina State	2	–	5	4	–	6
Norfolk State	1	–	7	2	–	9
Morgan State	0	–	7	2	–	8
$ – Conference champion; ^ – NCAA Division I-AA playoff participant; Rankings from The Sports Network poll

The 1999 North Carolina A&T Aggies football team represented North Carolina A&T State University as a member of Mid-Eastern Athletic Conference (MEAC) during the 1999 NCAA Division I-AA football season. Led by 11th-year head coach Bill Hayes, the Aggies compiled an overall record of 11–2 with a mark of 8–0 in conference play, winning the MEAC title. North Carolina A&T earned an automatic bid to the NCAA Division I-AA Football Championship playoffs, where the Aggies beat Tennessee State in the first round before losing to eventual national runner-up, Youngstown State, in the quarterfinals. The team's performance earned them the program's third black college football national championship. North Carolina A&T played home games at Aggie Stadium in Greensboro, North Carolina.

== Schedule ==
Date	Opponent	Rank	Site	Result	Attendance	Source
September 5	vs. North Carolina Central*		Carter–Finley Stadium; Raleigh, NC (rivalry)	W 20–7	20,000	
September 11	at Winston-Salem State*		Bowman Gray Stadium; Winston-Salem, NC (rivalry)	W 20–7	17,781	
September 25	at Elon*		Burlington Memorial Stadium; Burlington, NC	L 7–40	7,600	
October 2	at Norfolk State		William "Dick" Price Stadium; Norfolk, VA	W 28–14		
October 9	No. 13 Hampton		Aggie Stadium; Greensboro, NC	W 41–24	10,406	
October 16	at Morgan State		PSINet Stadium; Baltimore, MD	W 30–6	22,147	
October 23	Howard^{†}		Aggie Stadium; Greensboro, NC	W 51–0	28,793	
October 30	at Bethune–Cookman	No. 25	Municipal Stadium; Daytona Beach, FL	W 19–18		
November 6	Delaware State	No. 24	Aggie Stadium; Greensboro, NC	W 24–13	16,661	
November 13	No. 8 Florida A&M	No. 23	Aggie Stadium; Greensboro, NC	W 30–15	19,908	
November 20	vs. South Carolina State	No. 16	Ericsson Stadium; Charlotte, NC (Carolinas Classic, rivalry)	W 27–7	26,862	
November 27	at No. 1 Tennessee State*	No. 16	Adelphia Coliseum; Nashville, TN (NCAA Division I-AA First Round)	W 24–10	10,736	
December 4	at No. 9 Youngstown State*	No. 16	Stambaugh Stadium; Youngstown, OH (NCAA Division I-AA Quarterfinal)	L 3–41	16,955	
*Non-conference game; ^{†}Homecoming; Rankings from The Sports Network Poll released prior to the game

== Postseason ==
=== 2000 NFL draft ===
The 2000 NFL draft was held on April 15–16, 2000 at The Theater at Madison Square Garden in New York City. The following A&T players were either selected or signed as undrafted free agents following the draft.

Player	Position	Round	Overall pick	NFL team
Maurice Smith	RB	—-	Undrafted FA	Atlanta Falcons
