= 1999 Delaware Fightin' Blue Hens football team =

American college football season

1999 Delaware Fightin' Blue Hens football
- Conference: Atlantic 10 Conference
- Record: 7–4 (5–3 A-10)
- Head coach: Tubby Raymond (34th season)
- Offensive coordinator: Ted Kempski (32nd season)
- Offensive scheme: Delaware Wing-T
- Defensive coordinator: Bob Sabol (9th season)
- Base defense: 4–3
- Home stadium: Delaware Stadium

1999 Atlantic 10 Conference football standings
	Conf.			Overall
Team	W		L	W		L
No. 13 James Madison +^	7	–	1	8	–	4
No. 7 UMass +^	7	–	1	9	–	4
No. 24 Villanova	6	–	2	7	–	4
Delaware	5	–	3	7	–	4
William & Mary	5	–	3	6	–	5
Connecticut	3	–	5	4	–	7
Maine	3	–	5	4	–	7
New Hampshire	3	–	5	5	–	6
Richmond	3	–	5	5	–	6
Northeastern	1	–	7	2	–	9
Rhode Island	1	–	7	1	–	10
+ – Conference co-champions; ^ – NCAA Division I-AA playoff participant; Rankings from The Sports Network poll

The 1999 Delaware Fightin' Blue Hens football team represented the University of Delaware as a member of the Atlantic 10 Conference (A-10) during the 1999 NCAA Division I-AA football season. Led by 34th-year head coach Tubby Raymond, the Fightin' Blue Hens compiled an overall record of 7–4 with a mark of 5–3 in conference play, tying for fourth place in the A-10. The team played home games at Delaware Stadium in Newark, Delaware.

== Schedule ==
Date	Opponent	Rank	Site	Result	Attendance	Source
September 2	No. 25 William & Mary	No. 11	Delaware Stadium; Newark, DE (rivalry)	W 34–27 ^{2OT}	22,038	
September 11	at The Citadel*	No. 8	Johnson Hagood Stadium; Charleston, SC	W 26–16	14,759	
September 18	West Chester*	No. 9	Delaware Stadium; Newark, DE (rivalry)	W 29–10	19,260	
September 25	at James Madison	No. 7	Bridgeforth Stadium; Harrisonburg, VA (rivalry)	L 7–21		
October 2	Richmond	No. 14	Delaware Stadium; Newark, DE	W 41–33	22,028	
October 16	No. 9 Lehigh*^{†}	No. 11	Delaware Stadium; Newark, DE (rivalry)	L 35–42	22,032	
October 23	No. 24 UMass	No. 18	Delaware Stadium; Newark, DE	L 19–26	19,590	
October 30	at Northeastern		Parsons Field; Brookline, MA	W 37–34 ^{OT}		
November 6	at New Hampshire	No. 25	Cowell Stadium; Durham, NH	W 14–10		
November 13	Rhode Island	No. 24	Delaware Stadium; Newark, DE	W 35–0	17,227	
November 20	at Villanova	No. 22	Villanova Stadium; Villanova, Pennsylvania (Battle of the Blue)	L 45–51 ^{OT}		
*Non-conference game; ^{†}Homecoming; Rankings from The Sports Network Poll released prior to the game

== Roster ==
1999 Delaware Fightin' Blue Hens football team roster
Players
Coaches
Offense

Pos.	#	Name	Class
FB	1	James O'Neal	Jr
WR	7	Jamin Elliott	So
QB	9	Sam Postlethwait	So
QB	11	Matt Nagy	Jr
OL	50	Jeff Fiss	Jr

Defense

Pos.	#	Name	Class

Special teams

Pos.	#	Name	Class

Head coach

- Tubby Raymond

Coordinators/assistant coaches

Legend

- (C) Team captain
- (S) Suspended
- (I) Ineligible
- Injured
- Redshirt

Roster
