= 1999 William & Mary Tribe football team =

American college football season

1999 William & Mary Tribe football
- Conference: Atlantic 10 Conference
- Record: 6–5 (5–3 A-10)
- Head coach: Jimmye Laycock (20th season)
- Offensive coordinator: Zbig Kepa (7th season)
- Captains: Chris Morris; Raheem Walker; Ed Zaptin
- Home stadium: Zable Stadium

1999 Atlantic 10 Conference football standings
	Conf.			Overall
Team	W		L	W		L
No. 13 James Madison +^	7	–	1	8	–	4
No. 7 UMass +^	7	–	1	9	–	4
No. 24 Villanova	6	–	2	7	–	4
Delaware	5	–	3	7	–	4
William & Mary	5	–	3	6	–	5
Connecticut	3	–	5	4	–	7
Maine	3	–	5	4	–	7
New Hampshire	3	–	5	5	–	6
Richmond	3	–	5	5	–	6
Northeastern	1	–	7	2	–	9
Rhode Island	1	–	7	1	–	10
+ – Conference co-champions; ^ – NCAA Division I-AA playoff participant; Rankings from The Sports Network poll

The 1999 William & Mary Tribe football team represented the College of William & Mary as member of the Atlantic 10 Conference (A-10) during the 1999 NCAA Division I-AA football season. Led by Jimmye Laycock in his 20th year as head coach, William & Mary finished the season with an overall record of 6–5 and a mark of 5–3 in A-10 play, tying for fourth place.

== Schedule ==
Date	Opponent	Rank	Site	Result	Attendance	Source
September 2	at No. 11 Delaware	No. 25	Delaware Stadium; Newark, DE (rivalry)	L 27–34 ^{2OT}	22,038	
September 11	at No. 23 (I-A) NC State*		Carter–Finley Stadium; Raleigh, NC	L 9–38	42,386	
September 18	Furman*		Zable Stadium; Williamsburg, VA	L 6–52	6,390	
September 25	at Northeastern		Parsons Field; Brookline, MA	W 42–30	3,721	
October 9	No. 19 Villanova		Zable Stadium; Williamsburg, VA	W 45–10	4,923	
October 16	No. 13 James Madison		Zable Stadium; Williamsburg, VA (rivalry)	L 20–30	9,225	
October 23	at VMI*		Alumni Memorial Field; Lexington, VA (rivalry)	W 35–14	5,273	
October 30	Maine		Zable Stadium; Williamsburg, VA	W 37–13	9,358	
November 6	at Rhode Island		Meade Stadium; Kingston, RI	W 24–6	6,130	
November 13	No. 17 UMass		Zable Stadium; Williamsburg, VA	L 16–25	7,055	
November 20	at Richmond		University of Richmond Stadium; Richmond, VA (I-64 Bowl)	W 34–14	13,411	
*Non-conference game; Rankings from The Sports Network Poll released prior to the game
