= 1999 Hampton Pirates football team =

American college football season

1999 Hampton Pirates football

Heritage Bowl, W 24–3 vs. Southern
- Conference: Mid-Eastern Athletic Conference
- Record: 8–4 (5–3 MEAC)
- Head coach: Joe Taylor (8th season)
- Offensive coordinator: Donald Hill-Eley (3rd season)
- Defensive coordinator: Alonzo Lee (3rd season)
- Home stadium: Armstrong Stadium

1999 Mid-Eastern Athletic Conference football standings
	Conf.			Overall
Team	W		L	W		L
No. 10 North Carolina A&T $^	8	–	0	11	–	2
No. 4 Florida A&M ^	7	–	1	11	–	4
Hampton	5	–	3	8	–	4
Bethune–Cookman	4	–	4	7	–	4
Howard	4	–	4	5	–	6
Delaware State	4	–	4	4	–	7
South Carolina State	2	–	5	4	–	6
Norfolk State	1	–	7	2	–	9
Morgan State	0	–	7	2	–	8
$ – Conference champion; ^ – NCAA Division I-AA playoff participant; Rankings from The Sports Network poll

The 1999 Hampton Pirates football team represented Hampton University as a member of the Mid-Eastern Athletic Conference (MEAC) during the 1999 NCAA Division I-AA football season. Led by eight-year head coach Joe Taylor, the Pirates compiled an overall record of 8–4 with a mark of 5–3 in conference play, placing third in MEAC. Hampton was invited to the Heritage Bowl, where the Pirates beat Southern. The team played home games at Armstrong Stadium in Hampton, Virginia

== Schedule ==
Date	Opponent	Rank	Site	Result	Attendance	Source
September 4	Delaware State	No. 9	Armstrong Stadium; Hampton, VA	W 21–0		
September 11	at Howard	No. 7	RFK Stadium; Washington, DC (rivalry)	W 28–27	26,300	
September 18	vs. Arkansas–Pine Bluff*	No. 10	Trans World Dome; St. Louis, MO (Gateway Classic)	W 26–13	33,400	
September 25	vs. Grambling State*	No. 10	Giants Stadium; East Rutherford, NJ (Whitney Young Memorial Classic)	W 27–7	41,074	
October 2	vs. No. 9 Southern*	No. 8	RCA Dome; Indianapolis, IN (Circle City Classic)	L 6–21	50,622	
October 9	at North Carolina A&T	No. 13	Aggie Stadium; Greensboro, NC	L 24–41	10,406	
October 16	at Norfolk State	No. 22	William "Dick" Price Stadium; Norfolk, VA (rivalry)	W 28–27	10,232	
October 23	No. 14 Florida A&M	No. 20	Armstrong Stadium; Hampton, VA	L 6–41	9,421	
October 30	South Carolina State		Armstrong Stadium; Hampton, VA	W 39–27		
November 6	at Bethune–Cookman		Daytona Stadium; Daytona Beach, FL	L 27–34	6,245	
November 20	Morgan State		Armstrong Stadium; Hampton, VA	W 34–14		
December 18	vs. No. 17 Southern*		Georgia Dome; Atlanta, GA (Heritage Bowl)	W 24–3	29,561	
*Non-conference game; Rankings from The Sports Network Poll released prior to the game
