= 1999 Canisius Golden Griffins football team =

American college football season

1999 Canisius Golden Griffins football
- Conference: Metro Atlantic Athletic Conference
- Record: 1–10 (0–8 MAAC)
- Head coach: Chuck Williams (5th season)
- Home stadium: Demske Field

1999 Metro Atlantic Athletic Conference football standings
	Conf.			Overall
Team	W		L	W		L
Fairfield *	7	–	1	9	–	2
Georgetown	7	–	1	9	–	2
Duquesne $	6	–	2	8	–	3
Marist	5	–	3	6	–	5
Iona	4	–	4	5	–	5
La Salle	3	–	5	4	–	6
Siena	3	–	5	3	–	7
Saint Peter's	1	–	7	1	–	10
Canisius	0	–	8	1	–	10
+ – Conference co-champions; * – Fairfield was ineligible for conference title

The 1999 Canisius Golden Griffins football team represented Canisius College as a member of the Metro Atlantic Athletic Conference (MAAC) during the 1999 NCAA Division I-AA football season. Led by Chuck Williams in his fifth and final season as head coach, the Golden Griffins compiled an overall record of 1–10 with a mark of 0–8 in conference play, placing last out of nine teams in the MAAC. The Canisius offense scored 133 points while the defense allowed 431 points.

== Schedule ==
Date	Time	Opponent	Site	Result	Attendance	Source
September 11	7:00 pm	at Rochester*	Fauver Stadium; Rochester, NY	W 26–14	3,164	
September 18	1:00 pm	at Saint Peter's	Cochrane Stadium; Jersey City, NJ	L 22–33	1,200	
September 25	1:30 pm	Fairfield	Demske Field; Buffalo, NY	L 20–59	765	
October 2	1:30 pm	Marist	Demske Field; Buffalo, NY	L 7–49	1,037	
October 9	1:00 pm	at La Salle	McCarthy Stadium; Philadelphia, PA	L 6–19	4,719	
October 16	1:30 pm	at Alfred*	Merrill Field; Alfred, NY	L 16–23	1,114	
October 23	1:00 pm	at Siena	Heritage Park; Colonie, NY	L 6–38	491	
October 30	2:00 pm	Iona	Demske Field; Buffalo, NY	L 12–34	487	
November 6	1:00 pm	at St. John's*	DaSilva Memorial Field; Jamaica, NY	L 0–45	814	
November 13	1:30 pm	Georgetown	Demske Field; Buffalo, NY	L 6–49	325	
November 20	12:00 pm	at Duquesne	Arthur J. Rooney Athletic Field; Pittsburgh, PA	L 12–68	3,876	
*Non-conference game; All times are in Eastern time
