= 1999 Jackson State Tigers football team =

American college football season

1999 Jackson State Tigers football

SWAC East Division champion

SWAC Championship Game, L 30–31 vs. Southern
- Conference: Southwestern Athletic Conference
- East Division

Ranking
- Sports Network: No. 19
- Record: 9–3 (4–0 SWAC)
- Head coach: Judge Hughes (1st season)
- Home stadium: Mississippi Veterans Memorial Stadium

1999 Southwestern Athletic Conference football standings
	Conf.			Overall
Team	W		L	W		L
East Division
No. 19 Jackson State xy	4	–	0	9	–	3
Alabama A&M	3	–	1	6	–	5
Alcorn State	1	–	3	3	–	7
Mississippi Valley State	1	–	3	3	–	8
Alabama State	1	–	3	2	–	9
West Division
No. 17 Southern xy$	4	–	0	11	–	2
Texas Southern	3	–	1	6	–	5
Grambling State	2	–	2	7	–	4
Arkansas–Pine Bluff	1	–	3	6	–	5
Prairie View A&M	0	–	4	2	–	8
Championship: Southern 31, Jackson State 30
$ – Conference champion; x – Division champion/co-champions; y – Championship game participant; Rankings from The Sports Network Poll

The 1999 Jackson State Tigers football team represented Jackson State University as a member of the Southwestern Athletic Conference (SWAC) during the 1999 NCAA Division I-AA football season. Led by first-year head coach Judge Hughes, the Tigers compiled an overall record of 9–3 and a mark of 4–0 in conference play, and finished first in the SWAC East Division. The Tigers ended their season with a loss against Southern in the SWAC Championship Game.

== Schedule ==
Date	Opponent	Rank	Site	Result	Attendance	Source
September 4	Howard*	No. 18	Mississippi Veterans Memorial Stadium; Jackson, MS	W 35–21	11,000	
September 11	vs. No. 14 Tennessee State*	No. 17	Liberty Bowl Memorial Stadium; Memphis, TN (Southern Heritage Classic)	L 33–48	50,723	
September 18	Grambling State*	No. 24	Mississippi Veterans Memorial Stadium; Jackson, MS	W 31–6	19,600	
September 27	Mississippi Valley State	No. 21	Mississippi Veterans Memorial Stadium; Jackson, MS	W 63–0	19,521	
October 9	Alabama State	No. 18	Mississippi Veterans Memorial Stadium; Jackson, MS	W 44–17	10,500	
October 16	No. 5 Southern*	No. 17	Mississippi Veterans Memorial Stadium; Jackson, MS (rivalry)	L 14–26	55,000	
October 23	at Alabama A&M	No. 22	Louis Crews Stadium; Normal, AL	W 28–18	6,451	
October 30	Arkansas–Pine Bluff*^{†}	No. 18	Mississippi Veterans Memorial Stadium; Jackson, MS	W 41–0	25,000	
November 6	at Texas Southern*	No. 16	Robertson Stadium; Houston, TX	W 41–24	16,385	
November 13	at New Haven*	No. 15	West Haven, CT	W 30–23	2,811	
November 20	Alcorn State	No. 12	Mississippi Veterans Memorial Stadium; Jackson, MS (Capital City Classic)	W 58–6	52,500	
December 11	vs. No. 17 Southern	No. 19	Legion Field; Birmingham, AL (SWAC Championship Game)	L 30–31	47,621	
*Non-conference game; ^{†}Homecoming; Rankings from The Sports Network Poll released prior to the game
