= 1999 Tennessee State Tigers football team =

American college football season

1999 Tennessee State Tigers football

OVC champion

NCAA Division I-AA First Round, L 10–24 at North Carolina A&T
- Conference: Ohio Valley Conference

Ranking
- Sports Network: No. 11
- Record: 11–1 (7–0 OVC)
- Head coach: L. C. Cole (4th season)
- Offensive coordinator: James Reese (1st as OC, 8th overall season)
- Defensive coordinator: Andre Creamer (1st season)
- Home stadium: Adelphia Coliseum

1999 Ohio Valley Conference football standings
	Conf.			Overall
Team	W		L	W		L
No. 11 Tennessee State $^	7	–	0	11	–	1
Murray State	5	–	2	7	–	4
Eastern Kentucky	4	–	3	7	–	4
Western Kentucky	4	–	3	6	–	5
Tennessee Tech	4	–	3	5	–	5
Southeast Missouri State	2	–	5	3	–	8
Eastern Illinois	2	–	5	2	–	10
Tennessee–Martin	0	–	7	1	–	10
$ – Conference champion; ^ – NCAA Division I-AA playoff participant; Rankings from The Sports Network poll

The 1999 Tennessee State Tigers football team represented Tennessee State University as a member of the Ohio Valley Conference (OVC) during the 1999 NCAA Division I-AA football season. Led by fourth-year head coach L. C. Cole, the Tigers compiled an overall record of 11–1, with a conference record of 7–0, and finished as OVC champion. Tennessee State was upset by North Carolina A&T in the first round of the NCAA Division I-AA playoffs.

== Schedule ==
Date	Opponent	Rank	Site	Result	Attendance	Source
September 5	Alabama State*	No. 8	Adelphia Coliseum; Nashville, TN	W 41–8	31,119	
September 11	vs. No. 17 Jackson State*	No. 14	Liberty Bowl Memorial Stadium; Memphis, TN (Southern Heritage Classic)	W 48–33	50,723	
September 18	vs. No. 13 Florida A&M*	No. 12	Georgia Dome; Atlanta, GA (Atlanta Football Classic)	W 42–25	44,812	
October 2	at Alabama A&M*	No. 7	Louis Crews Stadium; Normal, AL	W 36–12		
October 9	Eastern Illinois	No. 5	Adelphia Coliseum; Nashville, TN	W 43–25	4,184	
October 16	at Tennessee–Martin	No. 4	Graham Stadium; Martin, TN	W 43–7		
October 23	at Western Kentucky	No. 2	L. T. Smith Stadium; Bowling Green, KY	W 28–21	13,100	
October 30	Eastern Kentucky	No. 2	Adelphia Coliseum; Nashville, TN	W 33–28		
November 6	Tennessee Tech^{†}	No. 2	Adelphia Coliseum; Nashville, TN	W 25–19	41,132	
November 13	Murray State	No. 2	Adelphia Coliseum; Nashville, TN	W 42–41	11,135	
November 20	at Southeast Missouri State	No. 1	Houck Stadium; Cape Girardeau, MO	W 35–28		
November 27	No. 16 North Carolina A&T*	No. 1	Adelphia Coliseum; Nashville, TN (NCAA Division I-AA First Round)	L 10–24	10,736	
*Non-conference game; ^{†}Homecoming; Rankings from The Sports Network Poll released prior to the game
