= 1999 Villanova Wildcats football team =

American college football season

1999 Villanova Wildcats football
- Conference: Atlantic 10 Conference

Ranking
- Sports Network: No. 24
- Record: 7–4 (6–2 A-10)
- Head coach: Andy Talley (15th season)
- Offensive coordinator: Sam Venuto (1st season)
- Offensive scheme: Multiple spread
- Defensive coordinator: Joe Trainer (3rd season)
- Base defense: 4–3
- Home stadium: Villanova Stadium

1999 Atlantic 10 Conference football standings
	Conf.			Overall
Team	W		L	W		L
No. 13 James Madison +^	7	–	1	8	–	4
No. 7 UMass +^	7	–	1	9	–	4
No. 24 Villanova	6	–	2	7	–	4
Delaware	5	–	3	7	–	4
William & Mary	5	–	3	6	–	5
Connecticut	3	–	5	4	–	7
Maine	3	–	5	4	–	7
New Hampshire	3	–	5	5	–	6
Richmond	3	–	5	5	–	6
Northeastern	1	–	7	2	–	9
Rhode Island	1	–	7	1	–	10
+ – Conference co-champions; ^ – NCAA Division I-AA playoff participant; Rankings from The Sports Network poll

The 1999 Villanova Wildcats football team represented the Villanova University during the 1999 NCAA Division I-AA football season. The Wildcats were led by 15th-year head coach Andy Talley played their home games at Villanova Stadium in Villanova, Pennsylvania

== Schedule ==
Date	Opponent	Rank	Site	Result	Attendance	Source
September 4	at Air Force*		Falcon Stadium; Colorado Springs, CO	L 37–13	50,409	
September 11	at No. 12 Richmond		City Stadium; Richmond, VA	W 35–30	9,614	
September 18	No. 2 UMass	No. 22	Villanova Stadium; Villanova, PA	W 26–21	9,117	
September 25	at Penn*	No. 14	Franklin Field; Philadelphia, PA	W 34–6	18,722	
October 2	No. 22 James Madison	No. 11	Villanova Stadium; Villanova, PA	L 20–23	12,546	
October 9	William & Mary	No. 19	Villanova Stadium; Villanova, PA	L 10–45	4,923	
October 16	at Connecticut		Memorial Stadium; Storrs, CT	W 48–45 ^{3OT}	9,108	
October 23	Northeastern		Villanova Stadium; Villanova, PA	W 45–16	8,210	
October 30	at New Hampshire	No. 21	Cowell Stadium; Durham, NH	W 31–28	4,974	
November 13	No. 10 Youngstown State*	No. 19	Villanova Stadium; Villanova, PA	L 21–28	8,773	
November 20	No. 22 Delaware		Villanova Stadium; Villanova, PA (rivalry)	W 51–45 ^{OT}	12,550	
*Non-conference game; Rankings from The Sports Network Poll released prior to the game

== Roster ==
1999 Villanova Wildcats football team roster
Players
Coaches
Offense

Pos.	#	Name	Class
WR	4	Dashan Sanders	Jr
RB	5	Luke Stopper	So
QB	8	Kevin Rogers	Jr
QB	18	Chris Boden	Sr
RB	20	Brian Westbrook	Jr
OL	61	Brian Lewis	So
OT	74	Jason Laskowski	Jr
TE	80	Joe Kavanaugh	Sr

Defense

Pos.	#	Name	Class
DB	1	DeLonne Kelly	Sr
DB	2	Reginald Danage	Fr
DB	3	Hezekiah Lewis	Sr
DE	93	Jeff Petrone	Jr
DE	96	Tom Buczynski	So
DL	97	Craig Johnson	Sr

Special teams

Pos.	#	Name	Class

Head coach

- Andy Talley

Coordinators/assistant coaches

Legend

- (C) Team captain
- (S) Suspended
- (I) Ineligible
- Injured
- Redshirt

Roster

== Team players in the NFL ==
No Villanova players were selected in the 2000 NFL draft.
