= 1999 Connecticut Huskies football team =

American college football season

1999 Connecticut Huskies football
- Conference: Atlantic 10 Conference
- New England
- Record: 4–7 (3–5 A-10)
- Head coach: Randy Edsall (1st season)
- Offensive coordinator: Dave Warner (1st season)
- Offensive scheme: Multiple
- Defensive coordinator: Nick Rapone (1st season)
- Base defense: 4–3
- Home stadium: Memorial Stadium

1999 Atlantic 10 Conference football standings
	Conf.			Overall
Team	W		L	W		L
No. 13 James Madison +^	7	–	1	8	–	4
No. 7 UMass +^	7	–	1	9	–	4
No. 24 Villanova	6	–	2	7	–	4
Delaware	5	–	3	7	–	4
William & Mary	5	–	3	6	–	5
Connecticut	3	–	5	4	–	7
Maine	3	–	5	4	–	7
New Hampshire	3	–	5	5	–	6
Richmond	3	–	5	5	–	6
Northeastern	1	–	7	2	–	9
Rhode Island	1	–	7	1	–	10
+ – Conference co-champions; ^ – NCAA Division I-AA playoff participant; Rankings from The Sports Network poll

The 1999 Connecticut Huskies football team represented the University of Connecticut in the 1999 NCAA Division I-AA football season. This was Connecticut's final season competing at the NCAA Division I-AA level and as member of the Atlantic 10 Conference (A–10), as the program became an NCAA Division I-AA independent the following year. Led by Randy Edsall in his first year as head coach, Connecticut finished with season with an overall record of 4–7, tying for sixth place in the A-10 with a conference mark of 3–5.

== Schedule ==
Date	Time	Opponent	Rank	Site	TV	Result	Attendance	Source
September 4	7:00 pm	at No. 12 Hofstra*	No. 17	Hofsta Stadium; Hempstead, NY		L 17–56	9,381	
September 11	1:30 pm	at Kentucky*		Commonwealth Stadium; Lexington, KY		L 14–45	63,879	
September 18	7:00 pm	Buffalo*		Memorial Stadium; Storrs, CT	CPTV	W 23–0	12,547	
September 25	1:00 pm	at Maine		Alfond Stadium; Orono, ME	FSNNE	W 34–20	6,113	
October 2	1:30 pm	Rhode Island		Memorial Stadium; Storrs, CT (rivalry)		W 20–9	11,769	
October 16	1:30 pm	Villanova		Memorial Stadium; Storrs, CT		L 45–48 ^{3OT}	9,108	
October 23	3:00 pm	at No. 11 James Madison		Bridgeforth Stadium; Harrisonburg, VA		L 14–48	12,500	
October 30	1:30 pm	Richmond		Memorial Stadium; Storrs, CT		L 21–28	9,731	
November 6	1:00 pm	Northeastern		Memorial Stadium; Storrs, CT		W 29–24	7,329	
November 13	1:00 pm	New Hampshire		Memorial Stadium; Storrs, CT		L 18–43	7,286	
November 20	12:30 pm	at No. 13 UMass		Warren McGuirk Alumni Stadium; Hadley, MA (rivalry)		L 20–62	3,876	
*Non-conference game; Rankings from The Sports Network Poll released prior to the game; All times are in Eastern time
