= 1999 Florida A&M Rattlers football team =

American college football season

1999 Florida A&M Rattlers football

NCAA Division I-AA Semifinal, L 24–27 at Youngstown State
- Conference: Mid-Eastern Athletic Conference

Ranking
- Sports Network: No. 4
- Record: 11–4 (7–1 MEAC)
- Head coach: Billy Joe (6th season)
- Offensive scheme: Gulf Coast
- Home stadium: Bragg Memorial Stadium

1999 Mid-Eastern Athletic Conference football standings
	Conf.			Overall
Team	W		L	W		L
No. 10 North Carolina A&T $^	8	–	0	11	–	2
No. 4 Florida A&M ^	7	–	1	11	–	4
Hampton	5	–	3	8	–	4
Bethune–Cookman	4	–	4	7	–	4
Howard	4	–	4	5	–	6
Delaware State	4	–	4	4	–	7
South Carolina State	2	–	5	4	–	6
Norfolk State	1	–	7	2	–	9
Morgan State	0	–	7	2	–	8
$ – Conference champion; ^ – NCAA Division I-AA playoff participant; Rankings from The Sports Network poll

The 1999 Florida A&M Rattlers football team represented Florida A&M University as a member of the Mid-Eastern Athletic Conference (MEAC) during the 1999 NCAA Division I-AA football season. Led by sixth-year head coach Billy Joe, the Rattlers compiled an overall record of 11–4, with a mark of 7–1 in conference play, and finished second in the MEAC. Florida A&M finished their season with a loss against Youngstown State in the Division I-AA playoffs.

== Schedule ==
Date	Opponent	Rank	Site	Result	Attendance	Source
September 4	at No. 8 (I-A) Miami (FL)*	No. 6	Miami Orange Bowl; Miami, FL	L 3–57	54,147	
September 11	Norfolk State	No. 13	Bragg Memorial Stadium; Tallahassee, FL	W 56–7	12,902	
September 18	vs. No. 12 Tennessee State*	No. 13	Georgia Dome; Atlanta, GA (Atlanta Football Classic)	L 25–42	44,812	
September 25	vs. South Carolina State	No. 19	Alltel Stadium; Jacksonville, FL (Orange Blossom–Palmetto Classic)	W 76–17	20,542	
October 2	Morgan State	No. 18	Bragg Memorial Stadium; Tallahassee, FL	W 66–10	15,478	
October 9	at Howard	No. 15	William H. Greene Stadium; Washington, DC	W 40–34 ^{3OT}	8,890	
October 23	at No. 20 Hampton	No. 14	Armstrong Stadium; Hampton, VA	W 41–6	9,421	
October 30	Delaware State	No. 13	Bragg Memorial Stadium; Tallahassee, FL	W 48–19	26,216	
November 6	No. 3 Southern*	No. 12	Bragg Memorial Stadium; Tallahassee, FL	W 65–18	19,058	
November 13	at No. 23 North Carolina A&T	No. 8	Aggie Stadium; Greensboro, NC	L 15–30	19,908	
November 20	vs. Bethune–Cookman	No. 15	Florida Citrus Bowl; Orlando, FL (Florida Classic)	W 63–14	70,125	
November 27	at No. 4 Appalachian State*	No. 14	Kidd Brewer Stadium; Boone, NC (NCAA Division I-AA First Round)	W 44–29	6,837	
December 4	at No. 6 Troy State*	No. 14	Veterans Memorial Stadium; Troy, AL (NCAA Division I-AA Quarterfinal)	W 17–10	12,689	
December 11	at No. 9 Youngstown State*	No. 14	Stambaugh Stadium; Youngstown, OH (NCAA Division I-AA Semifinal)	L 24–27	17,846	
*Non-conference game; Rankings from The Sports Network Poll released prior to the game
