= 1999 Richmond Spiders football team =

American college football season

1999 Richmond Spiders football
- Conference: Atlantic 10 Conference
- Record: 5–6 (3–5 A-10)
- Head coach: Jim Reid (5th season)
- Home stadium: University of Richmond Stadium

1999 Atlantic 10 Conference football standings
	Conf.			Overall
Team	W		L	W		L
No. 13 James Madison +^	7	–	1	8	–	4
No. 7 UMass +^	7	–	1	9	–	4
No. 24 Villanova	6	–	2	7	–	4
Delaware	5	–	3	7	–	4
William & Mary	5	–	3	6	–	5
Connecticut	3	–	5	4	–	7
Maine	3	–	5	4	–	7
New Hampshire	3	–	5	5	–	6
Richmond	3	–	5	5	–	6
Northeastern	1	–	7	2	–	9
Rhode Island	1	–	7	1	–	10
+ – Conference co-champions; ^ – NCAA Division I-AA playoff participant; Rankings from The Sports Network poll

The 1999 Richmond Spiders football team represented the University of Richmond as a member of the Atlantic 10 Conference (A-10) during the 1999 NCAA Division I-AA football season. Led by fifth-year head coach Jim Reid, the Spiders compiled an overall record of 5–6 with a mark of 3–5 in conference play, placing in a four-way tie for sixth in the A-10. The team played home game at University of Richmond Stadium in Richmond, Virginia.

== Schedule ==
Date	Time	Opponent	Site	Result	Attendance	Source
September 4	7:00 p.m.	VMI	University of Richmond Stadium; Richmond, VA (rivalry)	W 42–6	13,682	
September 11		Villanova	University of Richmond Stadium; Richmond, VA	L 30–35	9,614	
September 18		at Maine	Alfond Stadium; Orono, ME	L 14–21	5,139	
September 25		New Hampshire	University of Richmond Stadium; Richmond, VA	W 27–17	14,484	
October 2		at No. 14 Delaware	Delaware Stadium; Newark, DE	L 33–41	22,028	
October 9		Rhode Island	University of Richmond Stadium; Richmond, VA	W 41–38	5,179	
October 16	12:00 p.m.	at No. 3 Hofstra	James M. Shuart Stadium; Hempstead, NY	W 31–21	7,283	
October 30	1:30 p.m.	at Connecticut	Memorial Stadium; Storrs, CT	W 28–21	9,731	
November 6	1:00 p.m.	No. 17 UMass	University of Richmond Stadium; Richmond, VA	L 6–33	11,351	
November 13	12:00 p.m.	at No. 14 James Madison	Bridgeforth Stadium; Harrisonburg, VA (rivalry)	L 13–31	11,500	
November 20		William & Mary	University of Richmond Stadium; Richmond, VA (I-64 Bowl)	L 14–31	13,411	
Rankings from The Sports Network Poll released prior to the game; All times are in Eastern time

== Roster ==
1999 Richmond Spiders football team roster
Players
Coaches
Offense

Pos.	#	Name	Class
OL	72	Ken Farrar	So
OL	74	Bert Horsley	Jr
OL	77	Justin McElfish	Fr
OL	79	Anthony Ciampoli	So
WR	80	Muneer Moore	Sr
WR	81	Dan McNair	Fr
WR	83	Dwaune Jones	Sr

Defense

Pos.	#	Name	Class
LB	6	Paris Lenon	Sr

Special teams

Pos.	#	Name	Class

Head coach

- Jim Reid

Coordinators/assistant coaches

Legend

- (C) Team captain
- (S) Suspended
- (I) Ineligible
- Injured
- Redshirt

Roster
