= 1999 UMass Minutemen football team =

American college football season

1999 UMass Minutemen football
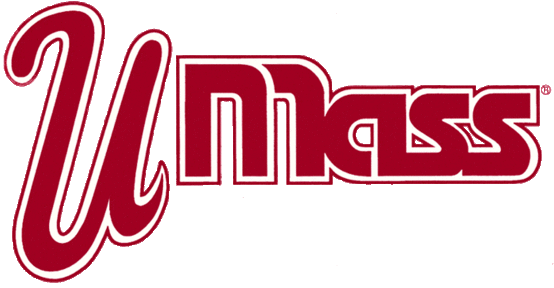

A-10 champion

NCAA Division I-AA Quarterfinal, L 21–38 vs. Georgia Southern
- Conference: Atlantic 10 Conference

Ranking
- Sports Network: No. 7
- Record: 9–4 (7–1 A-10)
- Head coach: Mark Whipple (2nd season)
- Offensive scheme: Pro-style
- Defensive coordinator: Don Brown (2nd season)
- Base defense: 4–3
- Home stadium: Warren McGuirk Alumni Stadium

1999 Atlantic 10 Conference football standings
	Conf.			Overall
Team	W		L	W		L
No. 13 James Madison +^	7	–	1	8	–	4
No. 7 UMass +^	7	–	1	9	–	4
No. 24 Villanova	6	–	2	7	–	4
Delaware	5	–	3	7	–	4
William & Mary	5	–	3	6	–	5
Connecticut	3	–	5	4	–	7
Maine	3	–	5	4	–	7
New Hampshire	3	–	5	5	–	6
Richmond	3	–	5	5	–	6
Northeastern	1	–	7	2	–	9
Rhode Island	1	–	7	1	–	10
+ – Conference co-champions; ^ – NCAA Division I-AA playoff participant; Rankings from The Sports Network poll

The 1999 UMass Minutemen football team represented the University of Massachusetts Amherst in the 1999 NCAA Division I-AA football season as a member of the Atlantic 10 Conference. The team was coached by Mark Whipple and played its home games at Warren McGuirk Alumni Stadium in Hadley, Massachusetts. The Minutemen entered the season with high expectations as defending National Champions, but struggled out of the gate as they lost three of their first four games. UMass turned its fortune around after that, using a 77–0 thrashing of Northeastern to propel it on an eight-game winning streak. The Minutemen did not lose again until the second round of the NCAA Playoffs against the eventual champions, Georgia Southern. UMass finished the season with a record of 9–4 overall and 8–1 in conference play.

== Schedule ==
Date	Time	Opponent	Rank	Site	TV	Result	Attendance	Source
September 11	12:00 p.m.	New Hampshire	No. 2	McGuirk Stadium; Hadley, MA (rivalry)	A10 TV	W 34–19	14,120	
September 18	12:00 p.m.	at No. 21 Villanova	No. 2	Villanova Stadium; Villanova, PA		L 21–26	9,117	
September 25	7:00 p.m.	at Toledo*	No. 9	Glass Bowl; Toledo, OH		L 3–24	20,916	
October 2	12:00 p.m.	No. 6 Hofstra*	No. 16	McGuirk Stadium; Hadley, MA	FSN New York	L 14–27	13,827	
October 9	1:00 p.m.	Northeastern		McGuirk Stadium; Hadley, MA		W 77–0	15,747	
October 16	1:00 p.m.	at Maine	No. 25	Alfond Stadium; Orono, ME		W 38–17	6,874	
October 23	12:00 p.m.	at No. 18 Delaware	No. 24	Delaware Stadium; Newark, DE	A10 TV	W 26–19	19,590	
October 30	12:30 p.m.	Rhode Island	No. 20	McGuirk Stadium; Hadley, MA		W 31–9	13,879	
November 6	1:00 p.m.	at Richmond	No. 17	UR Stadium; Richmond, VA		W 33–6	11,351	
November 13	1:00 p.m.	at William & Mary	No. 17	Zable Stadium; Williamsburg, VA		W 25–16	7,055	
November 20	12:30 p.m.	Connecticut	No. 13	McGuirk Stadium; Hadley, MA (rivalry)		W 62–20	3,876	
November 27	1:00 p.m.	at No. 7 Furman*	No. 10	Paladin Stadium; Greenville, SC (NCAA Division I-AA First Round)		W 30–23 ^{OT}	7,215	
December 4	1:00 p.m.	at No. 2 Georgia Southern*	No. 10	Paulson Stadium; Statesboro, GA (NCAA Division I-AA Quarterfinal)		L 21–38	13,121	
*Non-conference game; Rankings from The Sports Network Poll released prior to the game; All times are in Eastern time
