= 1999 Southern Jaguars football team =

American college football season

1999 Southern Jaguars football

SWAC champion SWAC West Division champion

SWAC Championship Game, W 31–30 vs. Jackson State

Heritage Bowl, L 3–24 vs. Hampton
- Conference: Southwestern Athletic Conference
- West Division

Ranking
- Sports Network: No. 17
- Record: 11–2 (4–0 SWAC)
- Head coach: Pete Richardson (7th season)
- Home stadium: A. W. Mumford Stadium

1999 Southwestern Athletic Conference football standings
	Conf.			Overall
Team	W		L	W		L
East Division
No. 19 Jackson State xy	4	–	0	9	–	3
Alabama A&M	3	–	1	6	–	5
Alcorn State	1	–	3	3	–	7
Mississippi Valley State	1	–	3	3	–	8
Alabama State	1	–	3	2	–	9
West Division
No. 17 Southern xy$	4	–	0	11	–	2
Texas Southern	3	–	1	6	–	5
Grambling State	2	–	2	7	–	4
Arkansas–Pine Bluff	1	–	3	6	–	5
Prairie View A&M	0	–	4	2	–	8
Championship: Southern 31, Jackson State 30
$ – Conference champion; x – Division champion/co-champions; y – Championship game participant; Rankings from The Sports Network Poll

The 1999 Southern Jaguars football team represented Southern University as a member of the Southwestern Athletic Conference (SWAC) during the 1997 NCAA Division I-AA football season. Led by seventh-year head coach Pete Richardson, the Jaguars compiled an overall record of 11–2, with a conference record of 4–0, and finished as SWAC champion.

== Schedule ==
Date	Opponent	Rank	Site	Result	Attendance	Source
September 4	No. 7 Northwestern State*	No. 14	A. W. Mumford Stadium; Baton Rouge, LA	W 20–13	27,190	
September 11	Arkansas–Pine Bluff	No. 11	A. W. Mumford Stadium; Baton Rouge, LA	W 17–9	24,000	
September 18	Prairie View A&M	No. 11	A. W. Mumford Stadium; Baton Rouge, LA	W 42–0	24,751	
September 25	vs. Alabama State*	No. 12	Ladd–Peebles Stadium; Mobile, AL (Gulf Coast Classic)	W 36–13	36,612	
October 2	vs. No. 8 Hampton*	No. 9	RCA Dome; Indianapolis, IN (Circle City Classic)	W 21–6	50,622	
October 9	Alabama A&M*	No. 6	A. W. Mumford Stadium; Baton Rouge, LA	W 29–12	25,718	
October 16	at No. 17 Jackson State*	No. 5	Mississippi Veterans Memorial Stadium; Jackson, MS (rivalry)	W 26–14	55,000	
October 23	Alcorn State*	No. 3	A. W. Mumford Stadium; Baton Rouge, LA	W 28–6	27,012	
November 6	at No. 12 Florida A&M*	No. 3	Bragg Memorial Stadium; Tallahassee, FL	L 18–65	19,058	
November 13	at Texas Southern	No. 12	Astrodome; Houston, TX	W 23–14	33,004	
November 27	vs. Grambling State	No. 11	Louisiana Superdome; New Orleans, LA (Bayou Classic)	W 37–31	67,641	
December 11	vs. No. 19 Jackson State*	No. 17	Legion Field; Birmingham, AL (SWAC Championship Game)	W 31–30	47,621	
December 18	vs. Hampton*	No. 17	Georgia Dome; Atlanta, GA (Heritage Bowl)	L 3–24	29,561	
*Non-conference game; Rankings from The Sports Network Poll released prior to the game
