= 1999 NCAA Division I-AA football season =

American college football season

1999 NCAA Division I-AA season

Regular season
- Number of teams: 122
- Duration: August–November
- Payton Award: Adrian Peterson (RB, Georgia Southern)
- Buchanan Award: Al Lucas (DT, Troy State)

Playoff
- Duration: November 27–December 20
- Championship date: December 18, 1999
- Championship site: Finley Stadium; Chattanooga, Tennessee
- Champion: Georgia Southern

NCAA Division I-AA football seasons
- «1998 2000»

The 1999 NCAA Division I-AA football season, part of college football in the United States organized by the National Collegiate Athletic Association (NCAA) at the Division I-AA level, began in August 1999, and concluded with the 1999 NCAA Division I-AA Football Championship Game on December 18, 1999, at Finley Stadium in Chattanooga, Tennessee. The Georgia Southern Eagles won their fifth I-AA championship, defeating the Youngstown State Penguins by a score of 59−24.

== Conference changes and new programs ==
School	1998 Conference	1999 Conference
Alabama A&M	D-II Independent	SWAC (I-AA)
Albany	Eastern (D-II)	Northeast (I-AA)
Buffalo	I-AA Independent	MAC (I-A)
Elon	D-II Independent	I-AA Independent
La Salle	I-AA Independent	MAAC
Middle Tennessee State	Ohio Valley (I-AA)	I-A Independent
St. John's (NY)	MAAC	I-AA Independent
Stony Brook	Eastern (D-II)	Northeast (I-AA)
Western Kentucky	I-AA Independent	Ohio Valley

== Conference standings ==
1999 Atlantic 10 Conference football standings
	Conf.			Overall
Team	W		L	W		L
No. 13 James Madison +^	7	–	1	8	–	4
No. 7 UMass +^	7	–	1	9	–	4
No. 24 Villanova	6	–	2	7	–	4
Delaware	5	–	3	7	–	4
William & Mary	5	–	3	6	–	5
Connecticut	3	–	5	4	–	7
Maine	3	–	5	4	–	7
New Hampshire	3	–	5	5	–	6
Richmond	3	–	5	5	–	6
Northeastern	1	–	7	2	–	9
Rhode Island	1	–	7	1	–	10
+ – Conference co-champions; ^ – NCAA Division I-AA playoff participant; Rankings from The Sports Network poll

1999 Big Sky Conference football standings
	Conf.			Overall
Team	W		L	W		L
No. 8 Montana $^	7	–	1	9	–	3
No. 20 Portland State	6	–	2	8	–	3
Eastern Washington	6	–	2	7	–	4
Cal State Northridge	5	–	3	6	–	5
Sacramento State	3	–	5	6	–	5
Weber State	3	–	5	4	–	7
Idaho State	2	–	6	4	–	7
Montana State	2	–	6	4	–	7
No. 16 Northern Arizona ^	2	–	6	4	–	8
$ – Conference champion; ^ – NCAA Division I-AA playoff participant; Portland State games did not count in conference standings. Northern Arizona forfeited four conference wins, to Idaho State, Montana State, Weber State, Cal State Northridge.; Rankings from The Sports Network poll

1999 Gateway Football Conference standings
	Conf.			Overall
Team	W		L	W		L
No. 3 Illinois State $^	6	–	0	11	–	3
No. 2 Youngstown State ^	5	–	1	12	–	3
No. 15 Northern Iowa	3	–	3	8	–	3
Western Illinois	2	–	4	7	–	4
Southwest Missouri State	2	–	4	5	–	6
Indiana State	2	–	4	3	–	8
Southern Illinois	1	–	5	5	–	6
$ – Conference champion; ^ – NCAA Division I-AA playoff participant; Rankings from The Sports Network poll

1999 Ivy League football standings
	Conf.			Overall
Team	W		L	W		L
No. 25 Brown +	6	–	1	9	–	1
Yale +	6	–	1	9	–	1
Cornell	5	–	2	7	–	3
Penn	4	–	3	5	–	5
Harvard	3	–	4	5	–	5
Dartmouth	2	–	5	2	–	8
Columbia	1	–	6	3	–	7
Princeton	1	–	6	3	–	7
+ – Conference co-champions; Rankings from The Sports Network poll

1999 Metro Atlantic Athletic Conference football standings
	Conf.			Overall
Team	W		L	W		L
Fairfield *	7	–	1	9	–	2
Georgetown	7	–	1	9	–	2
Duquesne $	6	–	2	8	–	3
Marist	5	–	3	6	–	5
Iona	4	–	4	5	–	5
La Salle	3	–	5	4	–	6
Siena	3	–	5	3	–	7
Saint Peter's	1	–	7	1	–	10
Canisius	0	–	8	1	–	10
+ – Conference co-champions; * – Fairfield was ineligible for conference title

1999 Mid-Eastern Athletic Conference football standings
	Conf.			Overall
Team	W		L	W		L
No. 10 North Carolina A&T $^	8	–	0	11	–	2
No. 4 Florida A&M ^	7	–	1	11	–	4
Hampton	5	–	3	8	–	4
Bethune–Cookman	4	–	4	7	–	4
Howard	4	–	4	5	–	6
Delaware State	4	–	4	4	–	7
South Carolina State	2	–	5	4	–	6
Norfolk State	1	–	7	2	–	9
Morgan State	0	–	7	2	–	8
$ – Conference champion; ^ – NCAA Division I-AA playoff participant; Rankings from The Sports Network poll

1999 Northeast Conference football standings
	Conf.			Overall
Team	W		L	W		L
Robert Morris $	7	–	0	8	–	2
Albany	6	–	1	7	–	2
Wagner	5	–	2	5	–	5
Stony Brook	4	–	3	5	–	5
Central Connecticut State	3	–	4	4	–	6
Monmouth	2	–	5	2	–	8
Saint Francis (PA)	1	–	6	2	–	9
Sacred Heart	0	–	7	2	–	9
$ – Conference champion

1999 Ohio Valley Conference football standings
	Conf.			Overall
Team	W		L	W		L
No. 11 Tennessee State $^	7	–	0	11	–	1
Murray State	5	–	2	7	–	4
Eastern Kentucky	4	–	3	7	–	4
Western Kentucky	4	–	3	6	–	5
Tennessee Tech	4	–	3	5	–	5
Southeast Missouri State	2	–	5	3	–	8
Eastern Illinois	2	–	5	2	–	10
Tennessee–Martin	0	–	7	1	–	10
$ – Conference champion; ^ – NCAA Division I-AA playoff participant; Rankings from The Sports Network poll

1999 Patriot League football standings
	Conf.			Overall
Team	W		L	W		L
No. 14 Lehigh +^	5	–	1	10	–	2
No. 18 Colgate +^	5	–	1	10	–	2
Towson	4	–	2	7	–	4
Bucknell	3	–	3	7	–	4
Lafayette	2	–	4	4	–	7
Holy Cross	2	–	4	3	–	8
Fordham	0	–	6	0	–	11
+ – Conference co-champions; ^ – NCAA Division I-AA playoff participant; Rankings from The Sports Network poll

1999 Pioneer Football League standings
	Conf.			Overall
Team	W		L	W		L
Dayton $	4	–	0	6	–	4
Valparaiso	3	–	1	9	–	2
Drake	2	–	2	7	–	4
San Diego	1	–	3	5	–	5
Butler	0	–	4	5	–	5
$ – Conference champion

1999 Southern Conference football standings
	Conf.			Overall
Team	W		L	W		L
No. 1 Georgia Southern $^	7	–	1	13	–	2
No. 9 Appalachian State ^	7	–	1	9	–	3
No. 12 Furman ^	7	–	1	9	–	3
Wofford	5	–	3	6	–	5
East Tennessee State	4	–	4	6	–	5
Chattanooga	3	–	5	5	–	6
Western Carolina	2	–	6	3	–	8
The Citadel	1	–	7	2	–	9
VMI	0	–	8	1	–	10
$ – Conference champion; ^ – NCAA Division I-AA playoff participant; Rankings from The Sports Network I-AA Poll

1999 Southland Football League standings
	Conf.			Overall
Team	W		L	W		L
No. 6 Troy State +^	6	–	1	11	–	2
No. 22 Stephen F. Austin +	6	–	1	8	–	3
McNeese State	5	–	2	6	–	5
Sam Houston State	4	–	3	6	–	5
Northwestern State	3	–	4	4	–	7
Southwest Texas State	2	–	5	3	–	8
Jacksonville State	1	–	6	2	–	9
Nicholls State	1	–	6	1	–	10
+ – Conference co-champions; ^ – NCAA Division I-AA playoff participant; Rankings from The Sports Network poll

1999 Southwestern Athletic Conference football standings
	Conf.			Overall
Team	W		L	W		L
East Division
No. 19 Jackson State xy	4	–	0	9	–	3
Alabama A&M	3	–	1	6	–	5
Alcorn State	1	–	3	3	–	7
Mississippi Valley State	1	–	3	3	–	8
Alabama State	1	–	3	2	–	9
West Division
No. 17 Southern xy$	4	–	0	11	–	2
Texas Southern	3	–	1	6	–	5
Grambling State	2	–	2	7	–	4
Arkansas–Pine Bluff	1	–	3	6	–	5
Prairie View A&M	0	–	4	2	–	8
Championship: Southern 31, Jackson State 30
$ – Conference champion; x – Division champion/co-champions; y – Championship game participant; Rankings from The Sports Network Poll

1999 NCAA Division I-AA independents football standings
	Conf.			Overall
Team	W		L	W		L
No. 5 Hofstra ^		–		11	–	2
No. 21 Elon		–		9	–	2
Davidson		–		8	–	3
Southern Utah		–		8	–	3
No. 23 South Florida		–		7	–	4
Samford		–		7	–	4
St. Johns (NY)		–		7	–	4
Morehead State		–		5	–	5
Charleston Southern		–		4	–	6
Liberty		–		4	–	7
Jacksonville		–		3	–	6
Cal Poly		–		3	–	8
Austin Peay		–		3	–	8
Saint Mary's		–		2	–	9
^ – NCAA Division I-AA playoff participant; Rankings from The Sports Network poll

== Conference champions ==
Conference Champions

Atlantic 10 Conference – James Madison and Massachusetts
Big Sky Conference – Montana
Gateway Football Conference – Illinois State
Ivy League – Brown and Yale
Metro Atlantic Athletic Conference – Duquesne
Mid-Eastern Athletic Conference – North Carolina A&T
Northeast Conference – Robert Morris
Ohio Valley Conference – Tennessee State
Patriot League – Colgate and Lehigh
Pioneer Football League – Dayton
Southern Conference – Appalachian State, Furman, and Georgia Southern
Southland Football League – Stephen F. Austin and Troy State
Southwestern Athletic Conference – Southern

== Postseason ==
=== NCAA Division I-AA playoff bracket ===
First Round; November 27; Campus sites
1	Tennessee State*	10
16	North Carolina A&T	24
8	Montana*	27
9	Youngstown State	30
5	Troy State*	27
12	James Madison	7
4	Appalachian State*	29
13	Florida A&M	44
3	Hofstra*	27
14	Lehigh	15
6	Illinois State*	56
11	Colgate	13
7	Furman*	23
10	UMass	30*
2	Georgia Southern*	72
15	Northern Arizona	29

Quarterfinals; December 4 Campus sites
16	North Carolina A&T	3
9	Youngstown State*	41
5	Troy State*	10
13	Florida A&M	17
3	Hofstra*	20
6	Illinois State	37
10	UMass	21
2	Georgia Southern*	38

Semifinals; December 11; Campus sites
9	Youngstown State*	27
13	Florida A&M	24
6	Illinois State	17
2	Georgia Southern*	31

National Championship Game; December 18; Finley Stadium; Chattanooga, TN
9	Youngstown State	24
2	Georgia Southern	59

* By team name denotes host institution
* By score denotes overtime
