= Sherrod Coates =

American football player (born 1978)

No. 56, 48
- Position: Linebacker

Personal information
- Born: December 22, 1978 (age 47); Boynton Beach, Florida, U.S.
- Listed height: 6 ft 2 in (1.88 m)
- Listed weight: 225 lb (102 kg)

Career information
- High school: Santaluces (Lantana, Florida)
- College: Western Kentucky

Career history
- Cleveland Browns (2003–2004); Edmonton Eskimos (2006)

Career statistics
- Total tackles: 10
- Stats at Pro Football Reference

Sherrod Coates (born December 22, 1978) is an American former professional football player who was a linebacker in the National Football League (NFL) and Canadian Football League (CFL). He played for the Cleveland Browns from 2003 to 2004 and for the Edmonton Eskimos in 2006.
