= La Salle Explorers football =

American college football season

- First season: 1931; 95 years ago
- Last season: 2007; 19 years ago
- Athletic director: Thomas Brennan
- Location: Philadelphia, Pennsylvania, U.S.
- Stadium: McCarthy Stadium (capacity: 7,500)
- Conference: Metro Atlantic Athletic Conference
- Colors: Blue and gold
- All-time record: 86–110–8 (.441)
- Fight song: La Salle University Alma Mater
- Mascot: The Explorer

The La Salle Explorers football team was an American football team representing La Salle University. The team competed in the Metro Atlantic Athletic Conference (MAAC) football league at the NCAA Division I Football Championship Subdivision level (formerly I-AA).

== History ==
The football program existed from 1931 to 1941, until the start of World War II. The war reduced the number of male students at the university, so the football program ended in 1941. It was revived in 1997 and joined the MAAC football league in 1999.

At the end of the 2007 Football season, in which the team finished 0–10, it was announced that La Salle would again be discontinuing the Football program. The MAAC football league also dissolved soon thereafter.

In November 2009, the university settled a $7.5 million lawsuit with a football player who suffered a severe brain injury in a 2005 game.

== Honors ==
Two La Salle football players, Mike Mandarino and George Somers, played in the National Football League (NFL). The team had one undefeated season in 1934 (7–0–1) and former head coach Bill Manlove is a member of the College Football Hall of Fame.

== Yearly records ==
Season	Head coach	Overall record	Conference record
1931	Tom Conley	4–4	
1932	Tom Conley	4–2–2	
1933	Marty Brill	3–3–2	
1934	Marty Brill	7–0–1	
1935	Marty Brill	4–4–1	
1936	Marty Brill	6–4–1	
1937	Marty Brill	2–7	
1938	Marty Brill	4–4	
1939	Marty Brill	6–1–1	
1940	Jim Henry	6–2	
1941	Jim Henry	5–3	
1997	Bill Manlove	1–8	
1998	Bill Manlove	3–6	
1999	Bill Manlove	4–6	3–5 (T-6th/9)
2000	Bill Manlove	7–4	4–3 (4th/8)
2001	Bill Manlove	5–4	2–4 (T-5th/8)
2002	Archie Stalcup	2–9	2–6 (T-7th/9)
2003	Archie Stalcup	3–8	2–3 (T-3rd/6)
2004	Phil Longo	3–7	1–3 (T-3rd/5)
2005	Phil Longo	4–7	2–2 (T-3rd/5)
2006	Tim Miller	3–7	1–3 (T-4th/5)
2007	Tim Miller	0–10	0–3 (4th/4)
