= 1999 NCAA Division I-AA football rankings =

The 1999 NCAA Division I-AA football rankings are from the Sports Network poll of Division I-AA head coaches, athletic directors, sports information directors and media members. This is for the 1999 season.

== Legend ==
	Increase in ranking
	Decrease in ranking
	Not ranked previous week
(#–#)	Win–loss record
(Italics)	Number of first place votes
т	Tied with team above or below also with this symbol

== The Sports Network poll ==
	Preseason	Week 1 Sept 7	Week 2 Sept 14	Week 3 Sept 21	Week 4 Sept 28	Week 5 Oct 5	Week 6 Oct 12	Week 7 Oct 19	Week 8 Oct 26	Week 9 Nov 2	Week 10 Nov 9	Week 11 Nov 16	Week 12 Nov 23	Week 13 Postseason	
1.	Georgia Southern (58)	Georgia Southern (1–0) (44)	Georgia Southern (2–0) (50)	Georgia Southern (2–1) (36)	Georgia Southern (3–1) (39)	Georgia Southern (4–1) (53)	Georgia Southern (5–1) (57)	Troy State (6–0) (54)	Troy State (7–0) (60)	Troy State (8–0) (53)	Troy State (9–0) (61)	Tennessee State (10–0) (47)	Tennessee State (11–0) (43)	Georgia Southern (13–2) (51)	1.
2.	UMass (37)	UMass (0–0) (3)	UMass (1–0) (10)	Montana (2–0) (18)	Montana (3–0) (12)	Troy State (4–0) (9)	Troy State (5–0) (8)	Tennessee State (6–0) (8)	Tennessee State (7–0) (6)	Tennessee State (8–0) (4)	Tennessee State (9–0) (6)	Georgia Southern (9–2) (13)	Georgia Southern (9–2) (3)	Youngstown State (12–3)	2.
3.	Montana (4)	Montana (1–0) (2)	Montana (2–0) (4)	Appalachian State (1–1) (1)	Appalachian State (2–1)	Appalachian State (3–1)	Hofstra (6–0) (2)	Southern (7–0) (2)	Southern (8–0) (1)	Southern (8–0) (1)	Georgia Southern (8–2) (1)	Appalachian State (8–2) (2)	Appalachian State (9–2) (1)	Illinois State (11–3)	3.
4.	Appalachian State	Appalachian State (0–1) (1)	Appalachian State (1–1)	Northern Iowa (3–0) (8)	Troy State (3–0) (5)	Hofstra (5–0) (1)	Tennessee State (5–0) (2)	Montana (5–1)	Georgia Southern (6–2)	Georgia Southern (7–2)	Montana (8–1)	Hofstra (9–1)	Hofstra (10–1)	Florida A&M (10–4)	4.
5.	McNeese State (2)	Illinois State (1–0)	Illinois State (2–0)	Troy State (2–0) (5)	Northern Iowa (4–0) (4)	Tennessee State (4–0) (2)	Southern (6–0)	Georgia Southern (5–2) (1)	Montana (6–1)	Montana (7–1)	Appalachian State (7–2)	Illinois State (9–2)	Illinois State (9–2)	Hofstra (11–2)	5.
6.	Florida A&M	Hofstra (1–0)	Northern Iowa (2–0) (2)	Hofstra (3–0)	Hofstra (4–0)	Southern (5–0)	Illinois State (5–1)	Appalachian State (4–2)	Appalachian State (5–2)	Appalachian State (6–2)	Hofstra (8–1)	Troy State (9–1)	Troy State (10–1)	Troy State (11–2)	6.
7.	Northwestern State	Hampton (1–0)	Hofstra (2–0)	Delaware (3–0)	Tennessee State (3–0) (2)	Illinois State (4–1)	Montana (4–1)	Northern Iowa (6–1)	Lehigh (7–0)	Furman (7–1) (2)	Illinois State (8–2)	Montana (8–2)	Montana (9–2)	UMass (9–4)	7.
8.	Illinois State	Delaware (1–0)	Troy State (1–0) (1)	Tennessee State (3–0) (1)	Hampton (4–0)	Montana (3–1)	Northern Iowa (5–1)	Lehigh (6–0)	Youngstown State (7–1)	James Madison (7–1) (1)	Florida A&M (7–2)	Furman (8–2)	Furman (9–2)	Montana (9–3)	8.
9.	Hampton (2)	Northern Iowa (1–0) (1)	Delaware (2–0)	UMass (1–1) (2)	Southern (4–0)	Northern Iowa (4–1)	Lehigh (5–0)	Youngstown State (6–1)	Hofstra (7–1)	Lehigh (8–0)	Furman (7–2)	Youngstown State (9–2)	Youngstown State (9–2)	Appalachian State (9–3)	9.
10.	Troy State	Troy State (0–0)	Hampton (2–0)	Hampton (3–0)	Illinois State (3–1)	Lehigh (4–0)	Youngstown State (5–1)	Hofstra (6–1)	James Madison (6–1)	Hofstra (7–1)	Youngstown State (8–2)	Southern (9–1)	UMass (8–3)	North Carolina A&T (11–2)	10.
11.	Delaware	Southern (1–0)	Southern (2–0)	Illinois State (2–1)	Villanova (3–1)	Youngstown State (4–1)	Appalachian State (3–2)	James Madison (5–1)	Illinois State (6–2)	Illinois State (7–2)	Northern Iowa (7–2)	James Madison (8–2)	Southern (9–1)	Tennessee State (11–1)	11.
12.	Hofstra	Richmond (1–0)	Tennessee State (2–0) (1)	Southern (3–0)	Lehigh (3–0)	Delaware (4–1)	Delaware (4–1)	Illinois State (5–2)	Furman (6–1)	Florida A&M (6–2)	Southern (8–1)	Jackson State (8–2)	Lehigh (10–1)	Furman (9–3)	12.
13.	Tennessee State	Florida A&M (0–1)	Florida A&M (1–1)	Western Illinois (3–0)	Youngstown State (3–1)	Hampton (4–1)	James Madison (4–1)	East Tennessee State (5–1)	Florida A&M (5–2)	Northern Iowa (7–2)	Portland State (8–2)	UMass (7–3)	James Madison (8–3)	James Madison (8–4)	13.
14.	Southern	Tennessee State (1–0)	Western Illinois (2–0)	Villanova (2–1)	Delaware (3–1)	James Madison (4–1)	Florida A&M (4–2)	Furman (5–1)	Northern Iowa (6–2)	Youngstown State (7–2)	James Madison (7–2)	Lehigh (9–1)	Florida A&M (8–3)	Lehigh (10–2)	14.
15.	Richmond (1)	Northwestern State (0–1) (1)	McNeese State (1–1)	Lehigh (2–0)	Northern Arizona (2–1)	Florida A&M (3–2)	Eastern Kentucky (5–1)	Florida A&M (4–2)	Eastern Kentucky (6–1)	Portland State (7–2)	Jackson State (7–2)	Florida A&M (7–3)	Jackson State (9–2)	Northern Iowa (8–3)	15.
16.	Northern Iowa	McNeese State (0–1)	Northern Arizona (1–0)	South Florida (2–1)	UMass (1–2)	Eastern Kentucky (4–1)	East Tennessee State (4–1)	Eastern Kentucky (5–1)	South Florida (6–2)	Jackson State (6–2)	Lehigh (8–1)	North Carolina A&T (9–1)	North Carolina A&T (10–1)	Northern Arizona (8–4)	16.
17.	Connecticut	Jackson State (1–0)	Lehigh (1–0)	Northern Arizona (1–1)	East Tennessee State (4–0)	East Tennessee State (4–1)	Jackson State (4–1)	South Florida (5–2)	Portland State (6–2)	UMass (5–3)	UMass (6–3)	Northern Arizona (7–3)	Northern Arizona (8–3)	Southern U. (11–2)	17.
18.	Jackson State	Western Illinois (1–0)	Montana State (2–0)	Youngstown State (2–1)	Florida A&M (2–2)	Jackson State (3–1)	Furman (4–1)	Delaware (4–2)	Jackson State (5–2)	Eastern Kentucky (6–2)	South Florida (7–3)	Northern Iowa (7–3)	Northern Iowa (8–3)	Colgate (10–2)	18.
19.	Lehigh	Youngstown State (1–0)	Richmond (1–1) (1)	Florida A&M (1–2)	Western Illinois (3–1)	Villanova (3–2)	South Florida (4–2)	Western Illinois (5–2)	East Tennessee State (5–2)	Stephen F. Austin (6–2)	Villanova (6–3)	Colgate (9–1)	Colgate (10–1)	Jackson State (9–3)	19.
20.	Western Illinois	Lehigh (0–0)	Youngstown State (1–1)	East Tennessee State (3–0)	Jackson State (3–1)	Portland State (4–1)	Western Illinois (4–2)	Hampton (5–2)	UMass (4–3)	Villanova (6–3)	Northern Arizona (6–3)	Elon (9–2)	Elon (9–2)	Portland State (8–3)	20.
21.	Youngstown State	Northern Arizona (0–0)	South Florida (1–1)	Jackson State (2–1)	Eastern Kentucky (3–1)	South Florida (3–2)	Northern Arizona (3–2)	Elon (6–1)	Villanova (5–3)	South Florida (6–3)	Elon (8–2)	Portland State (8–3)	Portland State (8–3)	Elon (9–2)	21.
22.	Northern Arizona	Montana State (1–0)	Villanova (1–1)	Northwestern State (1–2)	James Madison (3–1)	Elon (5–0)	Hampton (4–2)	Jackson State (4–2)	Stephen F. Austin (5–2)	Northern Arizona (5–3)	Colgate (8–1)	Delaware (7–3)	Stephen F. Austin (8–3)	Stephen F. Austin (8–3)	22.
23.	South Florida	Eastern Kentucky (1–0)	Northwestern State (0–2)	McNeese State (1–2)	South Florida (2–2)	Northern Arizona (2–2)	Sacramento State (4–2)	Portland State (5–2)	Tennessee Tech (5–1)	Elon (7–2)	North Carolina A&T (8–1)	Stephen F. Austin (7–3)	South Florida (7–4)	South Florida (7–4)	23.
24.	Murray State	Colgate (0–1)	Jackson State (1–1)	Eastern Kentucky (2–1)	Sacramento State (3–1)	Western Illinois (3–2)	Elon (5–1)	UMass (3–3)	Northern Arizona (4–3)	North Carolina A&T (7–1)	Delaware (6–3)	Eastern Kentucky (7–3)	Villanova (7–4)	Villanova (7–4)	24.
25.	William & Mary	South Florida (0–1)	East Tennessee State (2–0)	Southern Illinois (3–0)	Elon (4–0)	Eastern Washington (3–2)	UMass (2–3)	Villanova (4–3)	North Carolina A&T (6–1)	Delaware (5–3)	Stephen F. Austin (6–3)	South Florida (7–4)	Brown (9–1)	Brown (9–1)	25.
	Preseason	Week 1 Sept 7	Week 2 Sept 14	Week 3 Sept 21	Week 4 Sept 28	Week 5 Oct 5	Week 6 Oct 12	Week 7 Oct 19	Week 8 Oct 26	Week 9 Nov 2	Week 10 Nov 9	Week 11 Nov 16	Week 12 Nov 23	Week 13 Postseason	
		Dropped: 17 Connecticut; 24 Murray State; 25 William & Mary	Dropped: 23 Eastern Kentucky; 24 Colgate	Dropped: 18 Montana State; 19 Richmond	Dropped: 22 Northwestern State; 23 McNeese State; 25 Southern Illinois	Dropped: 16 UMass; 24 Sacramento State	Dropped: 19 Villanova; 20 Portland State; 25 Eastern Washington	Dropped: 21 Northern Arizona; 23 Sacramento State	Dropped: 18 Delaware; 19 Western Illinois; 20 Hampton; 21 Elon	Dropped: 19 East Tennessee State; 23 Tennessee Tech	Dropped: 18 Eastern Kentucky	Dropped: 19 Villanova	Dropped: 22 Delaware; 24 Eastern Kentucky	None	
