= 1999 Davidson Wildcats football team =

American college football season

1999 Davidson Wildcats football
- Conference: Independent
- Record: 8–3
- Head coach: Tim Landis (7th season)
- Home stadium: Richardson Stadium

1999 NCAA Division I-AA independents football standings
	Conf.			Overall
Team	W		L	W		L
No. 5 Hofstra ^		–		11	–	2
No. 21 Elon		–		9	–	2
Davidson		–		8	–	3
Southern Utah		–		8	–	3
No. 23 South Florida		–		7	–	4
Samford		–		7	–	4
St. Johns (NY)		–		7	–	4
Morehead State		–		5	–	5
Charleston Southern		–		4	–	6
Liberty		–		4	–	7
Jacksonville		–		3	–	6
Cal Poly		–		3	–	8
Austin Peay		–		3	–	8
Saint Mary's		–		2	–	9
^ – NCAA Division I-AA playoff participant; Rankings from The Sports Network poll

The 1999 Davidson Wildcats football team was an American football team that represented Davidson College as an independent during the 1999 NCAA Division I-AA football season. Led by seventh-year head coach Tim Landis, the team compiled a 8–3 record.

== Schedule ==
Date	Opponent	Site	Result	Attendance	Source
September 2	at Morehead State	Jayne Stadium; Morehead, KY	L 0–40	6,827	
September 11	Jacksonville	Richardson Stadium; Davidson, NC	L 15–20	2,216	
September 18	Sewanee	Richardson Stadium; Davidson, NC	W 21–0		
September 25	at Emory and Henry	Fullerton Field; Emory, VA	L 13–17		
October 2	Guilford	Richardson Stadium; Davidson, NC	W 28–21	3,678	
October 9	at Washington and Lee	Wilson Field; Lexington, VA	W 35–28		
October 16	at Georgetown	Harbin Field; Washington, DC	W 28–27		
October 23	at Randolph–Macon	Day Field; Ashland, VA	W 24–16	1,250	
October 30	Hampden–Sydney	Richardson Stadium; Davidson, NC	W 31–12		
November 6	at Centre	Farris Stadium; Danville, KY	W 24–14		
November 13	Austin Peay	Richardson Stadium; Davidson, NC	W 38–22		
