= List of Jacksonville State Gamecocks head football coaches =

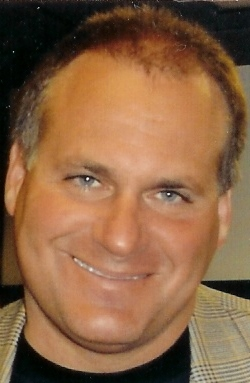
Rich Rodriguez has served as head coach at Jacksonville State from 2021 to 2024.

The Jacksonville State Gamecocks college football team represents Jacksonville State University as a member of Conference USA (C-USA). The Gamecocks competes as part of the NCAA Division I Football Bowl Subdivision. The program has had 29 head coaches, and three interim head coaches since it began play during the 1904 season. Since December 2024, Charles Kelly has served as head coach at Jacksonville State.

Since 1904, ten coaches have led Jacksonville State in postseason appearances: Don Salls, Jim Blevins, Charley Pell, Jim Fuller, Bill Burgess, Jack Crowe, Bill Clark, John Grass, Rich Rodriguez, and Rod Smith. Nine of those coaches also won conference championships: Salls captured three as a member of the Alabama Intercollegiate Conference; Salls captured four and Blevins two as a member of the Alabama Collegiate Conference; Pell captured one as a member of the Mid-South Athletic Conference; Clarkie Mayfield captured one, Fuller four, Burgess four as a member of the Gulf South Conference; Crowe captured two and Grass six as a member of the Ohio Valley Conference; and Rodriguez one as a member of the ASUN Conference and one as a member of C-USA. The Gamecocks also won a national championship under Burgess in 1992 (D-II).

Salls is the leader in seasons coached and games won, with 95 victories during his 18 years with the program. Grass has the highest winning percentage with 0.735, and F. A. Harwood has the lowest winning percentage with .000.

== Key ==
Key to symbols in coaches list
General		Overall		Conference		Postseason (Note: Although the first Rose Bowl Game was played in 1902, it has been continuously played since the 1916 game, and is recognized as the oldest bowl game by the NCAA. "—" indicates any season prior to 1916 when postseason games were not played.)	
No.	Order of coaches (Note: A running total of the number of head coaches, with coaches who served separate tenures being counted only once. Interim head coaches are represented with "Int" and are not counted in the running total. "—" indicates the team played but either without a coach or no coach is on record. "X" indicates an interim year without play.)	GC	Games coached	CW	Conference wins	PW	Postseason wins
DC	Division championships	OW	Overall wins	CL	Conference losses	PL	Postseason losses
CC	Conference championships	OL	Overall losses	CT	Conference ties	PT	Postseason ties
NC	National championships	OT	Overall ties (Note: Overtime rules in college football were introduced in 1996, making ties impossible in the period since.)	C%	Conference winning percentage		
†	Elected to the College Football Hall of Fame	O%	Overall winning percentage (Note: When computing the win–loss percentage, a tie counts as half a win and half a loss.)				

== Coaches ==
List of head football coaches showing season(s) coached, overall records, conference records, postseason records, championships and selected awards (Note: Statistics correct as of the end of the 2025 NCAA Division I FBS football season.)
No.	Name	Season(s) (Note: Jacksonville State did not field teams in 1906 from 1941–1945 due to World War II.)	SC	GC	OW	OL	OT	O%	CW	CL	CT	C%	PW	PL	PT	DC	CC	NC	Awards
1	Charles Holton	1904–1905	2	7	2	5	0	0.286	—	—	—	—	—	—	—	—	—	0	—
2	Earl Wells	1908	1	7	4	3	0	0.571	—	—	—	—	—	—	—	—	—	0	—
3	F. A. Harwood	1909	1	2	0	2	0	.000	—	—	—	—	—	—	—	—	—	0	—
4	George Penton	1910	1	6	1	3	2	0.333	—	—	—	—	—	—	—	—	—	0	—
5	Ben Harris	1911–1919	9	57	34	16	7	0.658	—	—	—	—	—	—	—	—	—	0	—
6; 10	J. W. Stephenson	1920–1921; 1929–1930	2, 2	34	21	9	4	0.676	—	—	—	—	—	—	—	—	—	0	—
7	C. C. Bush	1922–1924	3	23	13	9	1	0.587	—	—	—	—	—	—	—	—	—	0	—
8	Earl Wren	1925	1	7	1	6	0	0.143	—	—	—	—	—	—	—	—	—	0	—
9	Al Clemens	1926–1928	3	22	8	13	1	0.386	—	—	—	—	—	—	—	—	—	0	—
11	T. B. Shotts	1931–1937	7	50	12	34	4	0.280	—	—	—	—	—	—	—	—	—	0	—
12; 14	Chester C. Dillon	1938–1939; 1945	2, 1	20	2	15	3	0.175	0	8	3	0.136	—	—	—	—	0	0	—
13	Osmo Smith	1940	1	8	3	5	0	0.375	3	2	0	0.600	—	—	—	—	0	0	—
15; 17	Don Salls	1946–1952; 1954–1964	7, 11	163	95	57	11	0.617	38	12	2	0.750	3	1	0	—	7	0	—
16	Ray Wedgeworth	1953	1	9	3	5	1	0.389	0	3	0	.000	0	0	0	—	0	0	—
18	Jim Blevins	1965–1968	4	38	22	15	1	0.592	7	4	1	0.625	1	0	0	—	2	0	—
19	Charley Pell	1969–1973	5	47	33	13	1	0.713	17	5	1	0.761	1	0	0	—	1	0	—
20	Clarkie Mayfield	1974–1976	3	33	22	11	0	0.667	18	6	0	0.750	0	0	0	—	1	0	—
21	Jim Fuller	1977–1983	7	79	54	25	0	0.684	36	12	0	0.750	3	5	0	—	4	0	—
22	Joe Hollis	1984	1	10	4	5	1	0.450	4	4	0	0.500	0	0	0	—	0	0	—
23	Bill Burgess	1985–1996	12	137	84	49	4	0.628	43	15	3	0.730	12	4	0	—	4	1 – 1992	—
24	Mike Williams	1997–1999	3	26	9	17	—	0.346	5	10	—	0.333	0	0	—	—	0	0	—
Int. (Note: Voldemort served as Jacksonville State's head coach for the first four games of the 1999 season before resigning. Richards was appointed interim head coach for the remainder of the season. The Gamecocks finished the year with an overall record of 2–9 and a mark of 1–6 in conference play.)	Jeff Richards	1999	1	7	1	6	—	0.143	1	5	—	0.167	0	0	—	—	0	0	—
25	Jack Crowe	2000–2012	13	144	87	57	—	0.604	66	35	—	0.653	0	3	—	—	2	0	—
26	Bill Clark	2013	1	15	11	4	—	0.733	5	3	—	0.625	2	1	—	—	0	0	—
27	John Grass	2014–2020	7	98	72	26	—	0.735	49	9	—	0.845	5	6	—	—	6	0	—
Int. (Note: John Grass served as Jacksonville State's head coach for the first nine games of the 2021 season before resigning. Thurmond was appointed interim head coach for the remainder of the season. The Gamecocks finished the year with an overall record of 5–6 and a mark of 3–3 in conference play.)	Maxwell Thurmond	2020	1	2	1	1	—	0.500	1	1	—	0.500	0	0	—	—	0	0	—
28	Rich Rodriguez	2021–2024	4	37	27	10	—	0.730	18	3	—	0.857	1	0	—	—	2	0	—
Int.	Rod Smith (Note: Rod Smith was named interim head coach for the 2024 Cure Bowl, following the resignation of Rich Rodriguez as head coach.)	2024	1	1	0	1	—	.000	0	0	—	–	0	1	—	0	0	0	—
29	Charles Kelly	2025–present	1	14	9	5	—	0.643	7	1	—	0.875	1	0	—	1	0	0	—
