= 1999 McNeese State Cowboys football team =

American college football season

1999 McNeese State Cowboys football
- Conference: Southland Conference
- Record: 6–5 (5–2 Southland)
- Head coach: Kirby Bruchhaus (1st season)
- Co-offensive coordinators: Scott Stoker (1st season); John Nagle (1st season)
- Defensive coordinator: Tommy Tate (1st season)
- Home stadium: Cowboy Stadium

1999 Southland Football League standings
| | Conf. | | | Overall |
| Team | W | | L | W | | L |
|---|---|---|---|---|---|---|
| No. 6 Troy State +^ | 6 | – | 1 | 11 | – | 2 |
| No. 22 Stephen F. Austin + | 6 | – | 1 | 8 | – | 3 |
| McNeese State | 5 | – | 2 | 6 | – | 5 |
| Sam Houston State | 4 | – | 3 | 6 | – | 5 |
| Northwestern State | 3 | – | 4 | 4 | – | 7 |
| Southwest Texas State | 2 | – | 5 | 3 | – | 8 |
| Jacksonville State | 1 | – | 6 | 2 | – | 9 |
| Nicholls State | 1 | – | 6 | 1 | – | 10 |
+ – Conference co-champions; ^ – NCAA Division I-AA playoff participant; Rankings from The Sports Network poll

The 1999 McNeese State Cowboys football team was an American football team that represented McNeese State University as a member of the Southland Conference (Southland) during the 1999 NCAA Division I-AA football season. In their first year under head coach Kirby Bruchhaus, the team compiled an overall record of 6–5, with a mark of 5–2 in conference play, and finished third in the Southland.

== Schedule ==
| Date | Opponent | Rank | Site | Result | Attendance | Source |
|---|---|---|---|---|---|---|
| September 4 | No. 16 Northern Iowa* | No. 6 | Cowboy Stadium; Lake Charles, LA | L 17–41 | 16,370 | |
| September 11 | Texas A&M–Kingsville* | No. 16 | Cowboy Stadium; Lake Charles, LA | W 24–10 | 14,006 | |
| September 18 | Southern Utah* | No. 15 | Cowboy Stadium; Lake Charles, LA | L 24–31 | 12,755 | |
| October 2 | at Maine* | | Alfond Stadium; Orono, ME | L 7–35 | 3,943 | |
| October 9 | at Stephen F. Austin | | Homer Bryce Stadium; Nacogdoches, TX | L 14–40 | | |
| October 16 | at Jacksonville State | | Paul Snow Stadium; Jacksonville, AL | W 39–36 ^{2OT} | 4,888 | |
| October 23 | Northwestern State | | Cowboy Stadium; Lake Charles, LA (rivalry) | W 20–17 | 13,300 | |
| October 30 | Sam Houston State | | Cowboy Stadium; Lake Charles, LA | L 3–20 | 11,341 | |
| November 6 | at Southwest Texas State | | Bobcat Stadium; San Marcos, TX | W 10–7 | 5,243 | |
| November 13 | No. 1 Troy State | | Cowboy Stadium; Lake Charles, LA | W 24–7 | 12,418 | |
| November 20 | at Nicholls State | | John L. Guidry Stadium; Thibodaux, LA | W 38–0 | 2,343 | |
*Non-conference game; Rankings from The Sports Network Poll released prior to the game
