= 1999 Jacksonville Dolphins football team =

American college football team

1999 Jacksonville Dolphins football
- Conference: Independent
- Record: 3–6
- Head coach: Steve Gilbert (2nd season)
- Home stadium: D. B. Milne Field

1999 NCAA Division I-AA independents football standings
	Conf.			Overall
Team	W		L	W		L
No. 5 Hofstra ^		–		11	–	2
No. 21 Elon		–		9	–	2
Davidson		–		8	–	3
Southern Utah		–		8	–	3
No. 23 South Florida		–		7	–	4
Samford		–		7	–	4
St. Johns (NY)		–		7	–	4
Morehead State		–		5	–	5
Charleston Southern		–		4	–	6
Liberty		–		4	–	7
Jacksonville		–		3	–	6
Cal Poly		–		3	–	8
Austin Peay		–		3	–	8
Saint Mary's		–		2	–	9
^ – NCAA Division I-AA playoff participant; Rankings from The Sports Network poll

The 1999 Jacksonville Dolphins football team represented Jacksonville University as an independent during the 1999 NCAA Division I-AA football season. Led by second-year head coach Steve Gilbert, the Dolphins compiled a record of 3–6. Jacksonville played home games at D. B. Milne Field in Jacksonville, Florida.

== Schedule ==
Date	Time	Opponent	Site	Result	Attendance	Source
September 4		at Lenoir–Rhyne	Moretz Stadium; Hickory, NC	L 13–28	1,776	
September 11		at Davidson	Richardson Stadium; Davidson, NC	W 20–15	2,216	
September 25		Mississippi College	D. B. Milne Field; Jacksonville, FL	L 13–16	1,363	
October 2		at Austin Peay	Governors Stadium; Clarksville, TN	W 28–21	2,021	
October 16		Greensboro	D. B. Milne Field; Jacksonville, FL	W 48–41	235	
October 23		Virginia–Wise	D. B. Milne Field; Jacksonville, FL	L 12–17	2,173	
November 6		Drake	D. B. Milne Field; Jacksonville, FL	L 14–34	2,480	
November 13		at Tusculum	Pioneer Field (Tusculum); Tusculum, TN	L 36–42	1,234	
November 20	1:00 pm	Charleston Southern	D. B. Milne Field; Jacksonville, FL	L 17–37	1,164	
All times are in Eastern time
