= 1999 Hofstra Flying Dutchmen football team =

American college football season

1999 Hofstra Flying Dutchmen football

Lambert Cup winner

NCAA Division I-AA Quarterfinal, L 20–37 vs. Illinois State
- Conference: Independent

Ranking
- Sports Network: No. 5
- Record: 11–2
- Head coach: Joe Gardi (10th season)
- Captains: Giovanni Carmazzi; Jim Emanuel; Jimmy Jones; Vaughn Sanders
- Home stadium: James M. Shuart Stadium

1999 NCAA Division I-AA independents football standings
| | Conf. | | | Overall |
| Team | W | | L | W | | L |
|---|---|---|---|---|---|---|
| No. 5 Hofstra ^ | | – | | 11 | – | 2 |
| No. 21 Elon | | – | | 9 | – | 2 |
| Davidson | | – | | 8 | – | 3 |
| Southern Utah | | – | | 8 | – | 3 |
| No. 23 South Florida | | – | | 7 | – | 4 |
| Samford | | – | | 7 | – | 4 |
| St. Johns (NY) | | – | | 7 | – | 4 |
| Morehead State | | – | | 5 | – | 5 |
| Charleston Southern | | – | | 4 | – | 6 |
| Liberty | | – | | 4 | – | 7 |
| Jacksonville | | – | | 3 | – | 6 |
| Cal Poly | | – | | 3 | – | 8 |
| Austin Peay | | – | | 3 | – | 8 |
| Saint Mary's | | – | | 2 | – | 9 |
^ – NCAA Division I-AA playoff participant; Rankings from The Sports Network poll

The 1999 Hofstra Flying Dutchmen football team represented Hofstra University during the 1999 NCAA Division I-AA football season. It was the program's 59th season, and they competed as an Independent. The Flying Dutchmen earned a berth into the 16-team Division I-AA playoffs as the #3 seed, but lost in the quarterfinals to Illinois State, 37–20. They finished #5 in the final national poll and were led by 10th-year head coach Joe Gardi.

1999 was the last season in which Hofstra went by the nickname "Flying Dutchmen." Toward the end of the end of the 1999–2000 academic year, the school decided to change the nickname for their sports teams to "Pride" effective the following school year.

The season was overshadowed by the death of offensive lineman John Ciampi from a drug overdose. Ciampi, a junior and starting tackle, had been found in a semi-conscious state in his dormitory on October 31 before dying at a hospital later that day.

== Schedule ==
| Date | Time | Opponent | Rank | Site | TV | Result | Attendance | Source |
|---|---|---|---|---|---|---|---|---|
| September 4 | 7:00 p.m. | No. 17 Connecticut* | No. 12 | James M. Shuart Stadium; Hempstead, NY | Fox Sports | W 56–17 | 9,381 | |
| September 11 | | at Maine* | No. 6 | Alfond Stadium; Orono, ME | Fox Sports | W 27–19 | 9,050 | |
| September 18 | 12:00 p.m. | at Rhode Island* | No. 7 | Meade Stadium; Kingston, RI | Fox Sports | W 28–13 | | |
| September 25 | 12:00 p.m. | Cal Poly* | No. 6 | James M. Shuart Stadium; Hempstead, NY | Fox Sports | W 38–3 | 3,628 | |
| October 2 | 12:00 p.m. | at No. 16 UMass* | No. 6 | Warren McGuirk Alumni Stadium; Hadley, MA | | W 27–14 | 13,827 | |
| October 8 | 7:00 p.m. | Delaware State* | No. 4 | James M. Shuart Stadium; Hempstead, NY | | W 58–14 | | |
| October 16 | 12:00 p.m. | Richmond*^{†} | No. 3 | James M. Shuart Stadium; Hempstead, NY | Fox Sports | L 21–31 | 7,283 | |
| October 23 | 2:00 p.m. | at No. 21 Elon* | No. 10 | Burlington Memorial Stadium; Elon, NC | Fox Sports | W 21–9 | 4,982 | |
| November 6 | 12:00 p.m. | at Buffalo* | No. 10 | University at Buffalo Stadium; Amherst, NY | Fox Sports | W 20–13 | 8,699 | |
| November 13 | 7:00 p.m. | at No. 18 South Florida* | No. 6 | Raymond James Stadium; Tampa, FL | | W 42–23 | 25,583 | |
| November 20 | 12:00 p.m. | No. 11 James Madison* | No. 4 | James M. Shuart Stadium; Hempstead, NY | Metro TV | W 34–16 | 6,842 | |
| November 27 | | No. 12 Lehigh* | No. 4 | James M. Shuart Stadium; Hempstead, NY (NCAA Division I-AA First Round) | Fox Sports | W 27–15 | 6,770 | |
| December 4 | 12:00 p.m. | No. 5 Illinois State* | No. 4 | James M. Shuart Stadium; Hempstead, NY (NCAA Division I-AA Quarterfinal) | Fox Sports | L 20–37 | 5,586 | |
*Non-conference game; ^{†}Homecoming; Rankings from The Sports Network Poll released prior to the game; All times are in Eastern time

== Awards and honors ==
- First Team All-America – Giovanni Carmazzi (Walter Camp, The Sports Network, Associated Press, The Football Gazette); Jim Magda (Walter Camp, The Sports Network, The Football Gazette)
- Third Team All-America – Michael Rescigno (The Football Gazette); Doug Shanahan (The Football Gazette)
- Honorable Mention All-America – Jim Emanuel (The Football Gazette); Steve Jackson (The Football Gazette); Robert Thomas (The Football Gazette)
- First Team I-AA Independents – Giovanni Carmazzi, Jim Emanuel, Steve Jackson, Jim Magda, Michael Rescigno, Doug Shanahan, Robert Thomas
- ECAC First Team – Giovanni Carmazzi, Jim Magda, Michael Rescigno
- ECAC Player of the Year – Giovanni Carmazzi
- I-AA Independents Offensive Player of the Year – Giovanni Carmazzi
