= 1999 Youngstown State Penguins football team =

American college football season

1999 Youngstown State Penguins football

NCAA Division I-AA runner up

NCAA Division I-AA Championship Game, L 24–59 vs. Georgia Southern
- Conference: Gateway Football Conference

Ranking
- Sports Network: No. 2
- Record: 12–3 (5–1 Gateway)
- Head coach: Jim Tressel (14th season)
- Home stadium: Stambaugh Stadium

1999 Gateway Football Conference standings
	Conf.			Overall
Team	W		L	W		L
No. 3 Illinois State $^	6	–	0	11	–	3
No. 2 Youngstown State ^	5	–	1	12	–	3
No. 15 Northern Iowa	3	–	3	8	–	3
Western Illinois	2	–	4	7	–	4
Southwest Missouri State	2	–	4	5	–	6
Indiana State	2	–	4	3	–	8
Southern Illinois	1	–	5	5	–	6
$ – Conference champion; ^ – NCAA Division I-AA playoff participant; Rankings from The Sports Network poll

The 1999 Youngstown State Penguins football team was an American football team represented Youngstown State University in the Gateway Conference during the 1999 NCAA Division I-AA football season. In their 14th season under head coach Jim Tressel, the team compiled a 12–3 record (5–1 against conference opponents) and lost to Georgia Southern in the 1999 NCAA Division I-AA Football Championship Game. It was Youngstown State's sixth appearance in the national championship game during the 1990s.

Tailback Adrian Brown received the team's most valuable player award. The team's statistical leaders included Brown with 1,589 rushing yards and 108 points scored, Jeff Ryan with 2,573 passing yards, Elliott Giles with 1,301 receiving yards, and Ian Dominelli with 224 tackles (including 92 solo tackles).

== Schedule ==
Date	Opponent	Rank	Site	Result	Attendance	Source
September 2	No. 4 (D-II) Slippery Rock*	No. 21	Stambaugh Stadium; Youngstown, OH	W 44–14	16,552	
September 11	at Western Michigan*	No. 19	Waldo Stadium; Kalamazoo, MI	L 28–46	35,874	
September 18	No. 20 (D-II) IUP*	No. 20	Stambaugh Stadium; Youngstown, OH	W 13–7	15,022	
September 25	No. 13 Western Illinois	No. 18	Stambaugh Stadium; Youngstown, OH	W 28–24	16,032	
October 2	at Indiana State	No. 13	Memorial Stadium; Terre Haute, IN	W 31–28	4,364	
October 9	at Southern Illinois	No. 11	McAndrew Stadium; Carbondale, IL	W 43–37 ^{OT}	7,700	
October 16	Cal Poly*^{†}	No. 10	Stambaugh Stadium; Youngstown, OH	W 10–7	19,682	
October 23	at No. 7 Northern Iowa	No. 9	UNI-Dome; Cedar Falls, IA	W 29–20	10,163	
October 30	No. 11 Illinois State	No. 8	Stambaugh Stadium; Youngstown, OH	L 28–31	15,414	
November 6	Southwest Missouri State	No. 14	Stambaugh Stadium; Youngstown, OH	W 17–14	13,332	
November 13	at No. 19 Villanova*	No. 10	Villanova Stadium; Villanova, PA	W 28–21	8,773	
November 27	at No. 8 Montana*	No. 9	Washington–Grizzly Stadium; Missoula, MT (NCAA Division I-AA First Round)	W 30–27	17,261	
December 4	No. 16 North Carolina A&T*	No. 9	Stambaugh Stadium; Youngstown, OH (NCAA Division I-AA Quarterfinal)	W 41–3	16,955	
December 11	No. 14 Florida A&M*	No. 9	Stambaugh Stadium; Youngstown, OH (NCAA Division I-AA Semifinal)	W 27–24	17,846	
December 18	vs. No. 2 Georgia Southern*	No. 9	Finley Stadium; Chattanooga, TN (NCAA Division I-AA Championship Game)	L 24–59	20,052	
*Non-conference game; ^{†}Homecoming; Rankings from The Sports Network Poll released prior to the game
