= 1999 Cal State Northridge Matadors football team =

American college football season

1999 Cal State Northridge Matadors football
- Conference: Big Sky Conference
- Record: 6–5 (5–3 Big Sky)
- Head coach: Jeff Kearin (1st season)
- Home stadium: North Campus Stadium

1999 Big Sky Conference football standings
	Conf.			Overall
Team	W		L	W		L
No. 8 Montana $^	7	–	1	9	–	3
No. 20 Portland State	6	–	2	8	–	3
Eastern Washington	6	–	2	7	–	4
Cal State Northridge	5	–	3	6	–	5
Sacramento State	3	–	5	6	–	5
Weber State	3	–	5	4	–	7
Idaho State	2	–	6	4	–	7
Montana State	2	–	6	4	–	7
No. 16 Northern Arizona ^	2	–	6	4	–	8
$ – Conference champion; ^ – NCAA Division I-AA playoff participant; Portland State games did not count in conference standings. Northern Arizona forfeited four conference wins, to Idaho State, Montana State, Weber State, Cal State Northridge.; Rankings from The Sports Network poll

The 1999 Cal State Northridge Matadors football team represented California State University, Northridge as a member of the Big Sky Conference during the 1999 NCAA Division I-AA football season. Led by first-year head coach Jeff Kearin, Cal State Northridge finished the season with an overall record of 5–6 and a mark of 4–4 in conference play, placing fifth in the Big Sky. The Matadors played home games at North Campus Stadium in Northridge, California.

After the season ended, Northern Arizona was found to have used an ineligible player in six games and wasbe required to forfeit four victories, including a conference win over Cal State Northridge. The forfeit improved the Matadors' 1999 record to 6–5 overall and 5–3 in conference play and moved them up to fourth place in the Big Sky.

== Schedule ==
Date	Opponent	Site	Result	Attendance	Source
September 4	Western Oregon*	North Campus Stadium; Northridge, CA	W 38–19	3,142	
September 11	at Kansas*	Memorial Stadium; Lawrence, KS	L 14–71	33,300	
September 25	at Eastern Washington	Woodward Field; Cheney, WA	L 41–48	3,556	
October 2	Idaho State	North Campus Stadium; Northridge, CA	W 41–27	3,500	
October 9	at No. 8 Montana	Washington–Grizzly Stadium; Missoula, MT	L 27–48	18,874	
October 16	No. 23 Sacramento State	North Campus Stadium; Northridge, CA	W 36–14	5,183	
October 23	at Montana State	Bobcat Stadium; Bozeman, MT	W 24–21	10,007	
October 30	Weber State	North Campus Stadium; Northridge, CA	W 30–28	3,208	
November 6	at No. 15 Portland State	Civic Stadium; Portland, OR	L 21–34	10,153	
November 13	at SMU*	Cotton Bowl; Dallas, TX	L 16–58	7,494	
November 20	No. 17 Northern Arizona	North Campus Stadium; Northridge, CA	W 10–30 (forfeit win)	4,963	
*Non-conference game; Rankings from The Sports Network Poll released prior to the game
