= Tim Landis =

American football player and coach (born 1964)

Current position
- Title: Offensive coordinator & quarterbacks coach
- Team: Bloomsburg
- Conference: PSAC

Biographical details
- Born: July 13, 1964 (age 62); Yardley, Pennsylvania, U.S.

Playing career
- 1982–1985: Randolph–Macon
- Position: Quarterback

Coaching career (HC unless noted)
- 1986–1987: Randolph–Macon (WR)
- 1988–1990: Morrisville HS (PA)
- 1991–1992: Davidson (DL)
- 1993–1999: Davidson
- 2000–2002: Saint Mary's (CA)
- 2003–2009: Bucknell
- 2010: San Jose State (OC/TE)
- 2011: RPI
- 2013: Lycoming (TE)
- 2014–2022: Lycoming (ST/QB)
- 2024–present: Bloomsburg (OC/QB)

Head coaching record
- Overall: 89–103–1 (college)

Timothy Joseph Landis (born July 13, 1964) is an American college football coach. He is the offensive coordinator and quarterbacks coach for Bloomsburg University of Pennsylvania, positions he has held since 2024. Previously, Landis was the head coach for the Rensselaer Polytechnic Institute football team. He was also formerly the offensive coordinator for the San Jose State Spartans football team and the head football coach for Bucknell University. He compiled a 23–33 record at Bucknell since 2003 and a 76–85–1 record overall. Prior to arriving at Bucknell, Landis served as head football coach at Davidson and St. Mary's. During his second year at Davidson, Landis had the tremendous honor of winning the 1994 Bermuda Bowl for the Wildcats.

Landis is an alumnus of the Hun School of Princeton and Randolph-Macon College and a former quarterback on the Randolph-Macon football team. Prior to receiving the head coach positions, Landis served as an assistant at Davidson, as well as a high school coach.

== Head coaching record ==
=== College ===
Year	Team	Overall	Conference	Standing	Bowl/playoffs
Davidson Wildcats (NCAA Division I-AA independent) (1993–1999)
1993	Davidson	6–4			
1994	Davidson	3–7			
1995	Davidson	1–8–1			
1996	Davidson	6–4			
1997	Davidson	3–8			
1998	Davidson	8–2			
1999	Davidson	8–3			
Davidson:		35–36–1			
Saint Mary's Gaels (NCAA Division I-AA independent) (2000–2002)
2000	Saint Mary's	6–5			
2001	Saint Mary's	6–5			
2002	Saint Mary's	6–6			
Saint Mary's:		18–16			
Bucknell Bison (Patriot League) (2003–2009)
2003	Bucknell	6–6	4–3	4th	
2004	Bucknell	7–4	4–2	3rd	
2005	Bucknell	1–10	0–6	7th	
2006	Bucknell	6–5	3–3	4th	
2007	Bucknell	3–8	1–5	6th	
2008	Bucknell	5–6	2–4	5th	
2009	Bucknell	4–7	2–4	6th	
Bucknell:		32–46	16–27		
RPI Engineers (Liberty League) (2011)
2011	RPI	4–5	3–3	4th	
RPI:		4–5	3–3		
Total:		89–103–1			
