= 1999 Southwest Missouri State Bears football team =

American college football season

1999 Southwest Missouri State Bears football
- Conference: Gateway Football Conference
- Record: 5–6 (2–4 GFC)
- Head coach: Randy Ball (1st season)
- Offensive coordinator: Dan Enos (1st season)
- Defensive coordinator: Deion Melvin (1st season)
- Captains: Shawn Lockhart; Corky Martin; Jay Rodgers; Brad St. Louis
- Home stadium: Plaster Sports Complex

1999 Gateway Football Conference standings
| | Conf. | | | Overall |
| Team | W | | L | W | | L |
|---|---|---|---|---|---|---|
| No. 3 Illinois State $^ | 6 | – | 0 | 11 | – | 3 |
| No. 2 Youngstown State ^ | 5 | – | 1 | 12 | – | 3 |
| No. 15 Northern Iowa | 3 | – | 3 | 8 | – | 3 |
| Western Illinois | 2 | – | 4 | 7 | – | 4 |
| Southwest Missouri State | 2 | – | 4 | 5 | – | 6 |
| Indiana State | 2 | – | 4 | 3 | – | 8 |
| Southern Illinois | 1 | – | 5 | 5 | – | 6 |
$ – Conference champion; ^ – NCAA Division I-AA playoff participant; Rankings from The Sports Network poll

The 1999 Southwest Missouri State Bears football team represented Southwest Missouri State University (now known as Missouri State University) as a member of the Gateway Football Conference (GFC) during the 1999 NCAA Division I-AA football season. Led by first-year head coach Randy Ball, the Bears compiled an overall record of 5–6, with a mark of 2–4 in conference play, and finished tied for fourth in the GFC.

== Schedule ==
| Date | Opponent | Site | Result | Attendance | Source |
|---|---|---|---|---|---|
| September 4 | at Tulsa* | Skelly Stadium; Tulsa, OK | L 21–45 | 25,007 | |
| September 11 | Texas Southern* | Plaster Sports Complex; Springfield, MO | W 37–7 | 13,121 | |
| September 18 | Henderson State* | Plaster Sports Complex; Springfield, MO | W 50–3 | 12,102 | |
| September 25 | No. 11 Illinois State | Plaster Sports Complex; Springfield, MO | L 42–46 | 15,005 | |
| October 2 | at No. 19 Western Illinois | Hanson Field; Macomb, IL | W 27–17 | 10,478 | |
| October 16 | No. 8 Northern Iowa | Plaster Sports Complex; Springfield, MO | L 17–29 | 15,547 | |
| October 23 | at Southeast Missouri State* | Houck Stadium; Cape Girardeau, MO | L 23–28 | 3,652 | |
| October 30 | at Southern Illinois | McAndrew Stadium; Carbondale, IL | L 49–52 | 2,500 | |
| November 6 | at No. 13 Youngstown State | Stambaugh Stadium; Youngstown, OH | L 14–17 | 13,332 | |
| November 13 | Tennessee–Martin* | Plaster Sports Complex; Springfield, MO | W 62–7 | | |
| November 20 | Indiana State | Plaster Sports Complex; Springfield, MO | W 31–14 | 6,793 | |
*Non-conference game; Rankings from The Sports Network Poll released prior to the game
