= 1999 Northern Arizona Lumberjacks football team =

American college football season

1999 Northern Arizona Lumberjacks football

NCAA Division I-AA First Round, L 29–72 at Georgia Southern
- Conference: Big Sky Conference

Ranking
- Sports Network: No. 16
- Record: 4–8, 4 wins forfeited (2–6 Big Sky, 4 wins forfeited)
- Head coach: Jerome Souers (2nd season)
- Offensive coordinator: Brent Pease (1st season)
- Home stadium: Walkup Skydome

1999 Big Sky Conference football standings
| | Conf. | | | Overall |
| Team | W | | L | W | | L |
|---|---|---|---|---|---|---|
| No. 8 Montana $^ | 7 | – | 1 | 9 | – | 3 |
| No. 20 Portland State | 6 | – | 2 | 8 | – | 3 |
| Eastern Washington | 6 | – | 2 | 7 | – | 4 |
| Cal State Northridge | 5 | – | 3 | 6 | – | 5 |
| Sacramento State | 3 | – | 5 | 6 | – | 5 |
| Weber State | 3 | – | 5 | 4 | – | 7 |
| Idaho State | 2 | – | 6 | 4 | – | 7 |
| Montana State | 2 | – | 6 | 4 | – | 7 |
| No. 16 Northern Arizona ^ | 2 | – | 6 | 4 | – | 8 |
$ – Conference champion; ^ – NCAA Division I-AA playoff participant; Portland State games did not count in conference standings. Northern Arizona forfeited four conference wins, to Idaho State, Montana State, Weber State, Cal State Northridge.; Rankings from The Sports Network poll

The 1999 Northern Arizona Lumberjacks football team was an American football team that represented Northern Arizona University (NAU) as a member of the Big Sky Conference (Big Sky) during the 1999 NCAA Division I-AA football season. In their second year under head coach Jerome Souers, the Lumberjacks compiled an 8–4 record (6–2 against conference opponents), outscored opponents by a total of 409 to 370, and tied for second place in the Big Sky. The Lumberjacks were invited to play in the NCAA Division I-AA Football Championship playoffs, where they lost in the first round to eventual national champion Georgia Southern by a 72–29 score.

Northern Arizona later forfeited four conference victories—over Idaho State, Montana State, Weber State, and Cal State Northridge—due to use of ineligible player. This dropped their overall record to 4–8 and put them in the last-place tie in the Big Sky at 2–6.

The team played its home games at the J. Lawrence Walkup Skydome, commonly known as the Walkup Skydome, in Flagstaff, Arizona.

== Schedule ==
| Date | Opponent | Rank | Site | Result | Attendance | Source |
|---|---|---|---|---|---|---|
| September 9 | Cal Poly* | No. 21 | Walkup Skydome; Flagstaff, AZ | W 55–21 | 6,821 | |
| September 18 | at New Mexico* | No. 16 | University Stadium; Albuquerque, NM | L 14–45 | 22,079 | |
| September 25 | at Southwest Texas State* | No. 17 | Bobcat Stadium; San Marcos, TX | W 29–26 | 9,295 | |
| October 2 | Eastern Washington | No. 15 | Walkup Skydome; Flagstaff, AZ | L 10–14 | 12,863 | |
| October 9 | at Idaho State | No. 23 | Holt Arena; Pocatello, ID | L 43–28 (forfeit) | 6,572 | |
| October 16 | No. 7 Montana | No. 21 | Walkup Skydome; Flagstaff, AZ | L 23–43 | 13,304 | |
| October 23 | at Sacramento State | | Hornet Stadium; Sacramento, CA | W 51–49 ^{3OT} | 7,136 | |
| October 30 | Montana State | No. 24 | Walkup Skydome; Flagstaff, AZ | L 49–20 (forfeit) | 4,044 | |
| November 6 | at Weber State | No. 22 | Stewart Stadium; Ogden, UT | L 36–19 (forfeit) | 4,110 | |
| November 13 | No. 13 Portland State | No. 20 | Walkup Skydome; Flagstaff, AZ | W 40–24 | 7,188 | |
| November 20 | at Cal State Northridge | No. 17 | North Campus Stadium; Northridge, CA | L 30–10 (forfeit) | 4,963 | |
| November 27 | at No. 1 Georgia Southern* | No. 17 | Paulson Stadium; Statesboro, GA (NCAA Division I-AA First Round) | L 29–72 | 7,140 | |
*Non-conference game; Rankings from The Sports Network Poll released prior to the game
