= 1999 Troy State Trojans football team =

American college football season

1999 Troy State Trojans football

Southland co-champion

NCAA Division I-AA Quarterfinal, L 10–17 at Florida A&M
- Conference: Southland Football League

Ranking
- Sports Network: No. 6
- Record: 11–2 (6–1 Southland)
- Head coach: Larry Blakeney (9th season)
- Offensive coordinator: Don Jacobs (9th season)
- Defensive coordinator: Wayne Bolt (3rd season)
- Base defense: 4–3
- Home stadium: Veterans Memorial Stadium

1999 Southland Football League standings
	Conf.			Overall
Team	W		L	W		L
No. 6 Troy State +^	6	–	1	11	–	2
No. 22 Stephen F. Austin +	6	–	1	8	–	3
McNeese State	5	–	2	6	–	5
Sam Houston State	4	–	3	6	–	5
Northwestern State	3	–	4	4	–	7
Southwest Texas State	2	–	5	3	–	8
Jacksonville State	1	–	6	2	–	9
Nicholls State	1	–	6	1	–	10
+ – Conference co-champions; ^ – NCAA Division I-AA playoff participant; Rankings from The Sports Network poll

The 1999 Troy State Trojans football team represented Troy State University—now known as Troy University—as a member of the Southland Football League during the 1999 NCAA Division I-AA football season. Led by ninth-year head coach Larry Blakeney, the Trojans compiled an overall record of 11–2 with a mark of 6–1 in conference play, sharing the Southland title with Stephen F. Austin. For the second consecutive season and the sixth time in seven years, Troy State advanced to the NCAA Division I-AA Football Championship playoffs, beating James Madison in the first round before losing to Florida A&M in the quarterfinals. The Trojans finished the season ranked No. 6 in the Sports Network poll. The team played home games at Veterans Memorial Stadium in Troy, Alabama.

== Schedule ==
Date	Opponent	Rank	Site	Result	Attendance	Source
September 11	at Cincinnati*	No. 10	Nippert Stadium; Cincinnati, OH	W 31–24	16,091	
September 18	at Alabama State*	No. 8	Cramton Bowl; Montgomery, AL	W 27–20	18,107	
September 25	No. 16 South Florida*	No. 5	Veterans Memorial Stadium; Troy, AL	W 41–24	17,311	
October 2	at Middle Tennessee*	No. 4	Johnny "Red" Floyd Stadium; Murfreesboro, TN (rivalry)	W 48–31	17,137	
October 9	Northwestern State	No. 2	Veterans Memorial Stadium; Troy, AL	W 24–21	17,212	
October 16	at Southwest Texas State	No. 2	Bobcat Stadium; San Marcos, TX	W 24–17	8,733	
October 23	Sam Houston State^{†}	No. 1	Veterans Memorial Stadium; Troy, AL	W 41–16	17,426	
October 30	at Nicholls State	No. 1	John L. Guidry Stadium; Thibodaux, LA	W 20–0	2,536	
November 6	No. 19 Stephen F. Austin	No. 1	Veterans Memorial Stadium; Troy, AL	W 27–7	17,122	
November 13	at McNeese State	No. 1	Cowboy Stadium; Lake Charles, LA	L 7–24	12,418	
November 20	Jacksonville State	No. 6	Veterans Memorial Stadium; Troy, AL (Battle for the Ol' School Bell)	W 35–16	17,266	
November 27	No. 13 James Madison*	No. 6	Veterans Memorial Stadium; Troy, AL (NCAA Division I-AA First Round)	W 27–7	17,102	
December 4	No. 14 Florida A&M*	No. 6	Veterans Memorial Stadium; Troy, AL (NCAA Division I-AA Quarterfinal)	L 10–17	12,689	
*Non-conference game; ^{†}Homecoming; Rankings from The Sports Network Poll released prior to the game
