= 1999 Jacksonville State Gamecocks football team =

American college football season

1999 Jacksonville State Gamecocks football
- Conference: Southland Football League
- Record: 2–9 (1–6 Southland)
- Head coach: Mike Williams (3rd season; first 4 games); Jeff Richards (interim, final 7 games)
- Offensive coordinator: Jeff Richards (1st season)
- Defensive coordinator: Mike Bugar (1st season)
- Home stadium: Paul Snow Stadium

1999 Southland Football League standings
	Conf.			Overall
Team	W		L	W		L
No. 6 Troy State +^	6	–	1	11	–	2
No. 22 Stephen F. Austin +	6	–	1	8	–	3
McNeese State	5	–	2	6	–	5
Sam Houston State	4	–	3	6	–	5
Northwestern State	3	–	4	4	–	7
Southwest Texas State	2	–	5	3	–	8
Jacksonville State	1	–	6	2	–	9
Nicholls State	1	–	6	1	–	10
+ – Conference co-champions; ^ – NCAA Division I-AA playoff participant; Rankings from The Sports Network poll

The 1999 Jacksonville State Gamecocks football team represented Jacksonville State University as a member of the Southland Football League during the 1999 NCAA Division I-AA football season. The Gamecocks compiled an overall record of 2–9 with a mark of 1–6 in conference play, placing last in the Southland. Jacksonville State played home games at Paul Snow Stadium in Jacksonville, Alabama.

== Schedule ==
Date	Time	Opponent	Site	Result	Attendance	Source
September 4	6:00 p.m.	Alabama A&M*	Paul Snow Stadium; Jacksonville, AL	L 20–37	16,773	
September 18	6:00 p.m.	Union (KY)*	Paul Snow Stadium; Jacksonville, AL	W 68–13	8,447	
September 25	4:00 p.m.	Nicholls State	Paul Snow Stadium; Jacksonville, AL	L 42–45	8,353	
October 2	1:00 p.m.	at Samford*	Seibert Stadium; Homewood, AL (rivalry)	L 18–34	7,340	
October 9	7:00 p.m.	at Sam Houston State	Bowers Stadium; Huntsville, TX	L 17–51	5,667	
October 16	2:00 p.m.	McNeese State	Paul Snow Stadium; Jacksonville, AL	L 36–39 ^{2OT}	4,888	
October 23	4:00 p.m.	Southwest Texas State	Paul Snow Stadium; Jacksonville, AL	W 17–10	7,439	
October 30	2:00 p.m.	at No. 22 Stephen F. Austin	Homer Bryce Stadium; Nacogdoches, TX	L 16–33	4,133	
November 6	2:00 p.m.	at Northwestern State	Harry Turpin Stadium; Natchitoches, LA	L 7–35	6,228	
November 13	2:00 p.m.	No. 3 Georgia Southern*	Paul Snow Stadium; Jacksonville, AL	L 14–51	8,639	
November 20	6:00 p.m.	at No. 6 Troy State	Veterans Memorial Stadium; Troy, AL (Battle for the Ol' School Bell)	L 16–35	17,266	
*Non-conference game; Rankings from The Sports Network Poll released prior to the game; All times are in Central time
