= 1999 Illinois State Redbirds football team =

American college football season

1999 Illinois State Redbirds football

Gateway champion

NCAA Division I-AA Semifinal, L 17–28 vs. Georgia Southern
- Conference: Gateway Football Conference

Ranking
- Sports Network: No. 3
- Record: 11–3 (6–0 Gateway)
- Head coach: Todd Berry (4th season)
- Offensive coordinator: John Bond (4th season)
- Offensive scheme: Spread
- Defensive coordinator: Dennis Therrell (4th season)
- Base defense: 4–4
- MVPs: Damian Gregory; Mike Rodbro
- Captains: Rickey Garrett; Damian Gregory; Ryan Szokola; Willie Watts
- Home stadium: Hancock Stadium

1999 Gateway Football Conference standings
	Conf.			Overall
Team	W		L	W		L
No. 3 Illinois State $^	6	–	0	11	–	3
No. 2 Youngstown State ^	5	–	1	12	–	3
No. 15 Northern Iowa	3	–	3	8	–	3
Western Illinois	2	–	4	7	–	4
Southwest Missouri State	2	–	4	5	–	6
Indiana State	2	–	4	3	–	8
Southern Illinois	1	–	5	5	–	6
$ – Conference champion; ^ – NCAA Division I-AA playoff participant; Rankings from The Sports Network poll

The 1999 Illinois State Redbirds football team represented Illinois State University as a member of the Gateway Football Conference during the 1999 NCAA Division I-AA football season. Led by fourth-year head coach Todd Berry, the Redbirds compiled an overall record of 11–3 with a mark of 6–0 in conference play, winning the Gateway Football Conference title. Illinois State received an automatic bid to the NCAA Division I-AA Football Championship playoffs, where the Redbirds defeated Colgate in the first round and Hofstra in the quarterfinals before losing to Georgia Southern in the semifinals. Illinois State was ranked No. 3 in The Sports Network's postseason ranking of NCAA Division I-AA teams. The team played home games at Hancock Stadium in Normal, Illinois.

== Schedule ==
Date	Opponent	Rank	Site	Result	Attendance	Source
September 2	Truman State*	No. 8	Hancock Stadium; Normal, IL	W 41–9	10,458	
September 11	Southeast Missouri State*	No. 5	Hancock Stadium; Normal, IL	W 55–7	9,322	
September 18	at Minnesota*	No. 5	Hubert H. Humphrey Metrodome; Minneapolis, MN	L 7–55	33,726	
September 25	at Southwest Missouri State	No. 11	Robert W. Plaster Stadium; Springfield, MO	W 46–42	15,005	
October 2	No. 5 Northern Iowa^{†}	No. 10	Hancock Stadium; Normal, IL	W 47–28	11,378	
October 9	Indiana State	No. 7	Hancock Stadium; Normal, IL	W 20–17	10,870	
October 16	at No. 19 South Florida*	No. 6	Raymond James Stadium; Tampa, FL	L 13–14	22,054	
October 23	at Southern Illinois	No. 12	McAndrew Stadium; Carbondale, IL	W 55–48	13,100	
October 30	at No. 8 Youngstown State	No. 11	Stambaugh Stadium; Youngstown, OH	W 31–28	15,414	
November 6	Western Illinois	No. 11	Hancock Stadium; Normal, IL	W 38–30	14,108	
November 13	at Eastern Illinois*	No. 7	O'Brien Stadium; Charleston, IL (rivalry)	W 24–17	3,033	
November 27	No. 18 Colgate*	No. 5	Hancock Stadium; Normal, IL (NCAA Division I-AA First Round)	W 56–13	7,133	
December 4	at No. 4 Hofstra*	No. 5	James M. Shuart Stadium; Hempstead, NY (NCAA Division I-AA Quarterfinal)	W 37–20	5,586	
December 11	at No. 2 Georgia Southern*	No. 5	Paulson Stadium; Statesboro, GA (NCAA Division I-AA Semifinal)	L 17–28	12,299	
*Non-conference game; ^{†}Homecoming; Rankings from The Sports Network Poll released prior to the game
