= 1999 Southern Illinois Salukis football team =

American college football season

1999 Southern Illinois Salukis football
- Conference: Gateway Football Conference
- Record: 5–6 (1–5 Gateway)
- Head coach: Jan Quarless (3rd season)
- Home stadium: McAndrew Stadium

1999 Gateway Football Conference standings
	Conf.			Overall
Team	W		L	W		L
No. 3 Illinois State $^	6	–	0	11	–	3
No. 2 Youngstown State ^	5	–	1	12	–	3
No. 15 Northern Iowa	3	–	3	8	–	3
Western Illinois	2	–	4	7	–	4
Southwest Missouri State	2	–	4	5	–	6
Indiana State	2	–	4	3	–	8
Southern Illinois	1	–	5	5	–	6
$ – Conference champion; ^ – NCAA Division I-AA playoff participant; Rankings from The Sports Network poll

The 1999 Southern Illinois Salukis football team represented Southern Illinois University as a member of the Gateway Football Conference during the 1999 NCAA Division I-AA football season. They were led by third-year head coach Jan Quarless and played their home games at McAndrew Stadium in Carbondale, Illinois. The Salukis finished the season with a 5–6 record overall and a 1–5 record in conference play.

== Schedule ==
Date	Opponent	Rank	Site	Result	Attendance	Source
September 2	at Southeast Missouri State*		Houck Stadium; Cape Girardeau, MO	W 43–25	9,112	
September 11	Murray State*		McAndrew Stadium; Carbondale, IL	W 58–51	10,400	
September 18	at Eastern Illinois*		O'Brien Field; Charleston, IL	W 34–6	8,312	
September 25	at No. 4 Northern Iowa	No. 25	UNI-Dome; Cedar Falls, IA	L 14–34	13,840	
October 2	at No. 23 South Florida*		Raymond James Stadium; Tampa, FL	L 14–21	25,029	
October 9	No. 11 Youngstown State		McAndrew Stadium; Carbondale, IL	L 37–43 ^{OT}	7,700	
October 16	at No. 20 Western Illinois		Hanson Field; Macomb, IL	L 27–68	13,341	
October 23	No. 12 Illinois State		McAndrew Stadium; Carbondale, IL	L 48–55	13,100	
October 30	Southwest Missouri State		McAndrew Stadium; Carbondale, IL	W 52–49	2,500	
November 6	at Indiana State		Memorial Stadium; Terre Haute, IN	L 45–66	4,121	
November 20	Western Kentucky*		McAndrew Stadium; Carbondale, IL	W 52–14	2,400	
*Non-conference game; Rankings from The Sports Network Poll released prior to the game
