= 1999 Montana Grizzlies football team =

American college football season

1999 Montana Grizzlies football

Big Sky champion

NCAA Division I-AA First Round, L 27–30 vs. Youngstown State
- Conference: Big Sky Conference

Ranking
- Sports Network: No. 8
- Record: 9–3 (7–1 Big Sky)
- Head coach: Mick Dennehy (4th season)
- Home stadium: Washington–Grizzly Stadium

1999 Big Sky Conference football standings
	Conf.			Overall
Team	W		L	W		L
No. 8 Montana $^	7	–	1	9	–	3
No. 20 Portland State	6	–	2	8	–	3
Eastern Washington	6	–	2	7	–	4
Cal State Northridge	5	–	3	6	–	5
Sacramento State	3	–	5	6	–	5
Weber State	3	–	5	4	–	7
Idaho State	2	–	6	4	–	7
Montana State	2	–	6	4	–	7
No. 16 Northern Arizona ^	2	–	6	4	–	8
$ – Conference champion; ^ – NCAA Division I-AA playoff participant; Portland State games did not count in conference standings. Northern Arizona forfeited four conference wins, to Idaho State, Montana State, Weber State, Cal State Northridge.; Rankings from The Sports Network poll

The 1999 Montana Grizzlies football team represented the University of Montana in the 1999 NCAA Division I-AA football season. The Grizzlies were led by fourth-year head coach Mick Dennehy and played their home games at Washington–Grizzly Stadium.

== Schedule ==
Date	Time	Opponent	Rank	Site	Result	Attendance	Source
September 4	1:00 pm	South Dakota*	No. 3	Washington–Grizzly Stadium; Missoula, MT	W 45–13	18,191	
September 11	1:00 pm	Sacramento State	No. 3	Washington–Grizzly Stadium; Missoula, MT	W 41–38 ^{2OT}	18,648	
September 25	1:00 pm	Weber State	No. 2	Washington–Grizzly Stadium; Missoula, MT	W 81–22	18,740	
October 2	6:00 pm	at Portland State	No. 2	Civic Stadium; Portland, OR	L 48–51 ^{OT}	23,489	
October 9	1:00 pm	Cal State Northridge	No. 8	Washington–Grizzly Stadium; Missoula, MT	W 48–27	18,874	
October 16	5:00 pm	at No. 21 Northern Arizona	No. 7	Walkup Skydome; Flagstaff, AZ	W 42–23	13,304	
October 23	2:00 pm	Eastern Washington	No. 4	Washington–Grizzly Stadium; Missoula, MT (Governors Cup)	W 25–7	18,847	
October 30	6:30 pm	at Idaho State	No. 5	Holt Arena; Pocatello, ID	W 73–23	4,051	
November 6	2:00 pm	at Cal Poly*	No. 5	Mustang Stadium; San Luis Obispo, CA	W 28–14	5,720	
November 13	12:00 pm	Idaho*	No. 4	Washington–Grizzly Stadium; Missoula, MT (Little Brown Stein)	L 30–33	19,078	
November 20	12:00 pm	at Montana State	No. 7	Bobcat Stadium; Bozeman, MT (rivalry)	W 49–3	15,007	
November 27	12:00 pm	No. 9 Youngstown State*	No. 8	Washington–Grizzly Stadium; Missoula, MT (NCAA Division I-AA First Round)	L 27–30	17,261	
*Non-conference game; Rankings from The Sports Network Poll released prior to the game; All times are in Mountain time

== Roster ==
1999 Montana Grizzlies football team roster
Players
Coaches
Offense

Pos.	#	Name	Class
QB	7	Drew Miller	Jr
WR	8	Jimmy Farris	Jr
WR	17	Etu Molden	So
RB	21	Yohance Humphery	So
TE	44	John Fitzgerald	So
OT	72	Dylan McFarland	Fr
G	73	Thatcher Szalay	So
WR	80	Brock Sunderland	Fr
WR	81	Rory Zikmund	Fr
WR	85	Randyn Akiona	Fr

Defense

Pos.	#	Name	Class
SS	3	Trey Young	Fr
CB	13	Calvin Coleman	So
ILB	45	Jacob Yoro	So
LB	51	Rylan Jollymore	Sr
DT	90	Curt Colter	Fr
DE	97	Herbert Fernandez	Fr
DT	98	Jason Francis	So

Special teams

Pos.	#	Name	Class
K	30	Kris Heppner	Sr
P, TE	32	Dallas Neil	Sr

Head coach

- Mick Dennehy

Coordinators/assistant coaches

Legend

- (C) Team captain
- (S) Suspended
- (I) Ineligible
- Injured
- Redshirt

Roster
