= 1999 Northern Iowa Panthers football team =

American college football season

1999 Northern Iowa Panthers football
- Conference: Gateway Football Conference

Ranking
- Sports Network: No. 15
- Record: 8–3 (3–3 Gateway)
- Head coach: Mike Dunbar (3rd season)
- Offensive coordinator: Bret Ingalls (3rd season)
- Defensive coordinator: Jay Niemann (1st season)
- Home stadium: UNI-Dome

1999 Gateway Football Conference standings
	Conf.			Overall
Team	W		L	W		L
No. 3 Illinois State $^	6	–	0	11	–	3
No. 2 Youngstown State ^	5	–	1	12	–	3
No. 15 Northern Iowa	3	–	3	8	–	3
Western Illinois	2	–	4	7	–	4
Southwest Missouri State	2	–	4	5	–	6
Indiana State	2	–	4	3	–	8
Southern Illinois	1	–	5	5	–	6
$ – Conference champion; ^ – NCAA Division I-AA playoff participant; Rankings from The Sports Network poll

The 1999 Northern Iowa Panthers football team was an American football team that represented the University of Northern Iowa as a member of the Gateway Football Conference (Gateway Conference) during the 1999 NCAA Division I-AA football season. In its third year under head coach Mike Dunbar, the team compiled an 8–3 record (3–3 in conference games), outscored opponents by a total of 400 to 254, and finished third in the Gateway Conference. The team set school records with an average of 603.8 all-purpose yards per game.

The team's statistical leaders included junior quarterback Ryan Helming with 3,469 passing yards (a school record), wide receiver Mike Furrey with 1,179 receiving yards, and Adam Benge with 778 rushing yards. Furrey was also selected as a Division I-AA All-American by Phil Steele and the Walter Camp Football Foundation. Center Brad Meester received first-team honors from the Associated Press, American Football Coaches Association, Football Gazette, and Sports Network. Five Northern Iowa players received first-team honors on the 1999 all-Gateway Conference football team: Furrey; Meester; Helming; offensive lineman Matt Beals; and linebacker Matt Pedersen. Furrey tallied 74 receptions for 1,179 yards. Helming completed 253 of 403 passes for 3,469 yards (315.4 yards per game) and 31 touchdowns.

The team played its home games at the UNI-Dome in Cedar Falls, Iowa.

== Schedule ==
Date	Time	Opponent	Rank	Site	TV	Result	Attendance	Source
September 4	7:00 p.m.	at No. 6 McNeese State*	No. 16	Cowboy Stadium; Lake Charles, LA		W 41–17	16,370	
September 11	6:00 p.m.	at Ohio*	No. 9	Peden Stadium; Athens, OH		W 36–21	21,275	
September 18	6:30 p.m.	Central Washington*	No. 6	UNI-Dome; Cedar Falls, IA		W 44–7	11,304	
September 25	6:30 p.m.	No. 25 Southern Illinois	No. 4	UNI-Dome; Cedar Falls, IA		W 34–14	13,840	
October 2	3:30 p.m.	at No. 10 Illinois State	No. 5	Hancock Stadium; Normal, IL		L 28–47	11,378	
October 9	1:30 p.m.	Cal Poly*^{†}	No. 9	UNI-Dome; Cedar Falls, IA		W 42–21	14,292	
October 16	1:30 p.m.	at Southwest Missouri State	No. 8	Plaster Sports Complex; Springfield, MO		W 29–17	15,547	
October 23	3:05 p.m.	No. 9 Youngstown State	No. 7	UNI-Dome; Cedar Falls, IA	Gateway TV	L 20–29	10,163	
October 30	6:30 p.m.	Indiana State	No. 14	UNI-Dome; Cedar Falls, IA		W 44–21	9,604	
November 13	1:05 p.m.	at Western Illinois	No. 11	Hanson Field; Macomb, IL		L 27–46	8,574	
November 20	6:30 p.m.	Southwest Minnesota State*	No. 18	UNI-Dome; Cedar Falls, IA		W 55–14	10,347	
*Non-conference game; ^{†}Homecoming; Rankings from The Sports Network Poll released prior to the game; All times are in Central time

== Roster ==
1999 Northern Iowa Panthers football team roster
Players
Coaches
Offense

Pos.	#	Name	Class
RB	2	Dymon Adams	Sr
WR	3	Eddie Berlin	Jr
WR	4	Mike Furrey	Sr
C	63	Brad Meester	Sr

Defense

Pos.	#	Name	Class
SS	18	Regi Vettraino	Jr

Special teams

Pos.	#	Name	Class

Head coach

- Mike Dunbar

Coordinators/assistant coaches

- Bret Ingalls
  Offensive coordinator
- Jay Niemann
  Defensive coordinator & linebackers coach
- Garrick McGee
  Wide receivers

Legend

- (C) Team captain
- (S) Suspended
- (I) Ineligible
- Injured
- Redshirt

Roster
Last update: 2000-04-11

== Team players drafted in the NFL ==
The following players were selected in the 2000 NFL draft.

Player	Position	Round	Pick	Franchise
Brad Meester	Center	2	60	Jacksonville Jaguars
