= 1999 Northwestern State Demons football team =

American college football season

1999 Northwestern State Demons football
- Conference: Southland Conference
- Record: 4–7 (3–4 Southland)
- Head coach: Sam Goodwin (17th season)
- Offensive coordinator: Doug Ruse (3rd as OC, 6th overall season)
- Co-defensive coordinators: Kevin Coreless (1st as DC, 4th overall season); Jack Curtis (1st as DC, 6th overall season)
- Home stadium: Harry Turpin Stadium

1999 Southland Football League standings
	Conf.			Overall
Team	W		L	W		L
No. 6 Troy State +^	6	–	1	11	–	2
No. 22 Stephen F. Austin +	6	–	1	8	–	3
McNeese State	5	–	2	6	–	5
Sam Houston State	4	–	3	6	–	5
Northwestern State	3	–	4	4	–	7
Southwest Texas State	2	–	5	3	–	8
Jacksonville State	1	–	6	2	–	9
Nicholls State	1	–	6	1	–	10
+ – Conference co-champions; ^ – NCAA Division I-AA playoff participant; Rankings from The Sports Network poll

The 1999 Northwestern State Demons football team represented Northwestern State University as a member of the Southland Conference during the 1999 NCAA Division I-AA football season. Led by 17th-year head coach Sam Goodwin, the Demons compiled an overall record of 4–7 with a mark of 3–4 in conference play, placing in fifth place in the Southland. Northwestern State played home games at Harry Turpin Stadium in Natchitoches, Louisiana.

== Schedule ==
Date	Time	Opponent	Rank	Site	TV	Result	Attendance	Source
September 4		at No. 14 Southern*	No. 7	A. W. Mumford Stadium; Baton Rouge, LA		L 13–20	27,190	
September 11		at Southern Miss*		M. M. Roberts Stadium; Hattiesburg, MS		L 6–40	24,871	
September 18		Tarleton State*		Harry Turpin Stadium; Natchitoches, LA		W 52–6	14,450	
September 25	6:00 pm	at Louisiana–Monroe*		Malone Stadium; Monroe, LA		L 7–38	14,516	
October 2		Nicholls State		Harry Turpin Stadium; Natchitoches, LA (rivalry)		W 42–17	10,436	
October 9		at No. 2 Troy State		Veterans Memorial Stadium; Troy, AL		L 21–24	17,212	
October 23		at McNeese State		Cowboy Stadium; Lake Charles, LA (rivalry)	SCTN	W 20-17	13,300	
October 30		Southwest Texas State		Harry Turpin Stadium; Natchitoches, LA	TSAA	W 36–21	9,365	
November 6	2:00 pm	Jacksonville State		Harry Turpin Stadium; Natchitoches, LA		W 35–7	6,228	
November 13		at Sam Houston State		Bowers Stadium; Huntsville, TX		L 0–21	5,250	
November 20		No. 23 Stephen F. Austin		Harry Turpin Stadium; Natchitoches, LA (Chief Caddo)		L 14–29	6,313	
*Non-conference game; Rankings from The Sports Network Poll released prior to the game; All times are in Central time
