= 1999 Nicholls State Colonels football team =

American college football season

1999 Nicholls State Colonels football
- Conference: Southland Football League
- Record: 1–10 (1–6 Southland)
- Head coach: Daryl Daye (1st season)
- Offensive coordinator: Mike McCarty (1st season)
- Defensive coordinator: Jay Thomas (1st season)
- Home stadium: John L. Guidry Stadium

1999 Southland Football League standings
	Conf.			Overall
Team	W		L	W		L
No. 6 Troy State +^	6	–	1	11	–	2
No. 22 Stephen F. Austin +	6	–	1	8	–	3
McNeese State	5	–	2	6	–	5
Sam Houston State	4	–	3	6	–	5
Northwestern State	3	–	4	4	–	7
Southwest Texas State	2	–	5	3	–	8
Jacksonville State	1	–	6	2	–	9
Nicholls State	1	–	6	1	–	10
+ – Conference co-champions; ^ – NCAA Division I-AA playoff participant; Rankings from The Sports Network poll

The 1999 Nicholls State Colonels football team represented Nicholls State University as a member of the Southland Football League during the 1999 NCAA Division I-AA football season. Led by first-year head Daryl Daye, the Colonels compiled an overall record of 1–10 with a mark of 1–6 in conference play, tying for seventh place in the Southland. Nicholls State played home games at John L. Guidry Stadium in Thibodaux, Louisiana.

== Schedule ==
Date	Time	Opponent	Site	Result	Attendance	Source
September 4	7:00 p.m.	at Louisiana–Monroe*	Malone Stadium; Monroe, LA	L 10–27	12,722	
September 18		vs. No. 14 Western Illinois*	Tad Gormley Stadium; New Orleans, LA (Gormley Gridiron Classic)	L 13–14	8,764	
September 25	4:00 p.m.	Jacksonville State	John L. Guidry Stadium; Thibodaux, LA	W 45–42	8,353	
October 2		at Northwestern State	Harry Turpin Stadium; Natchitoches, LA (rivalry)	L 17–42	10,436	
October 9		Southwest Texas State	John L. Guidry Stadium; Thibodaux, LA (Battle for the Paddle)	L 0–16	2,863	
October 16	5:00 p.m.	at UCF*	Florida Citrus Bowl; Orlando, FL	L 0–28	13,875	
October 23		at Stephen F. Austin	Homer Bryce Stadium; Nacogdoches, TX	L 7–38	12,738	
October 30		No. 1 Troy State	John L. Guidry Stadium; Thibodaux, LA	L 0–20	2,536	
November 6		at Sam Houston State	Bowers Stadium; Huntsville, TX	L 17–69	6,269	
November 13		Samford*	John L. Guidry Stadium; Thibodaux, LA	L 24–28		
November 20		McNeese State	John L. Guidry Stadium; Thibodaux, LA	L 0–38	2,343	
*Non-conference game; Rankings from The Sports Network Poll released prior to the game; All times are in Central time
