= 1999 Portland State Vikings football team =

American college football season

1999 Portland State Vikings football
- Conference: Big Sky Conference

Ranking
- Sports Network: No. 20
- Record: 8–3 (6–2 Big Sky)
- Head coach: Tim Walsh (7th season)
- Home stadium: Civic Stadium

1999 Big Sky Conference football standings
| | Conf. | | | Overall |
| Team | W | | L | W | | L |
|---|---|---|---|---|---|---|
| No. 8 Montana $^ | 7 | – | 1 | 9 | – | 3 |
| No. 20 Portland State | 6 | – | 2 | 8 | – | 3 |
| Eastern Washington | 6 | – | 2 | 7 | – | 4 |
| Cal State Northridge | 5 | – | 3 | 6 | – | 5 |
| Sacramento State | 3 | – | 5 | 6 | – | 5 |
| Weber State | 3 | – | 5 | 4 | – | 7 |
| Idaho State | 2 | – | 6 | 4 | – | 7 |
| Montana State | 2 | – | 6 | 4 | – | 7 |
| No. 16 Northern Arizona ^ | 2 | – | 6 | 4 | – | 8 |
$ – Conference champion; ^ – NCAA Division I-AA playoff participant; Portland State games did not count in conference standings. Northern Arizona forfeited four conference wins, to Idaho State, Montana State, Weber State, Cal State Northridge.; Rankings from The Sports Network poll

The 1999 Portland State Vikings football team was an American football team that represented Portland State University during the 1999 NCAA Division I-AA football season as a member of the Big Sky Conference. In their seventh year under head coach Tim Walsh, the team compiled a 8–3 record, with a mark of 6–2 in conference play, and finished tied for second in the Big Sky.

== Schedule ==
| Date | Opponent | Rank | Site | Result | Attendance | Source |
|---|---|---|---|---|---|---|
| September 4 | at Fresno State* | | Bulldog Stadium; Fresno, CA | L 6–34 | 34,977 | |
| September 11 | Western Washington* | | Civic Stadium; Portland, OR | W 48–28 | | |
| September 16 | Eastern Washington | | Civic Stadium; Portland, OR | W 48–39 | 7,448 | |
| September 25 | at Idaho State | | Holt Arena; Pocatello, ID | W 52–13 | 5,887 | |
| October 2 | No. 2 Montana | | Civic Stadium; Portland, OR | W 51–48 ^{OT} | 23,489 | |
| October 9 | at Sacramento State | No. 20 | Hornet Stadium; Sacramento, CA | L 14–41 | 8,643 | |
| October 16 | Montana State | | Civic Stadium; Portland, OR | W 49–28 | | |
| October 23 | at Weber State | No. 23 | Stewart Stadium; Ogden, UT | W 31–14 | | |
| October 30 | at Cal Poly* | No. 17 | Mustang Stadium; San Luis Obispo, CA | W 42–28 | 7,058 | |
| November 6 | Cal State Northridge | No. 15 | Civic Stadium; Portland, OR | W 34–21 | 10,153 | |
| November 13 | at No. 20 Northern Arizona | No. 13 | Walkup Skydome; Flagstaff, AZ | L 24–40 | 7,188 | |
*Non-conference game; Rankings from The Sports Network Poll released prior to the game
