= 1999 Weber State Wildcats football team =

American college football season

1999 Weber State Wildcats football
- Conference: Big Sky Conference
- Record: 4–7 (3–5 Big Sky)
- Head coach: Jerry Graybeal (2nd season)
- Home stadium: Stewart Stadium

1999 Big Sky Conference football standings
	Conf.			Overall
Team	W		L	W		L
No. 8 Montana $^	7	–	1	9	–	3
No. 20 Portland State	6	–	2	8	–	3
Eastern Washington	6	–	2	7	–	4
Cal State Northridge	5	–	3	6	–	5
Sacramento State	3	–	5	6	–	5
Weber State	3	–	5	4	–	7
Idaho State	2	–	6	4	–	7
Montana State	2	–	6	4	–	7
No. 16 Northern Arizona ^	2	–	6	4	–	8
$ – Conference champion; ^ – NCAA Division I-AA playoff participant; Portland State games did not count in conference standings. Northern Arizona forfeited four conference wins, to Idaho State, Montana State, Weber State, Cal State Northridge.; Rankings from The Sports Network poll

The 1999 Weber State Wildcats football team represented Weber State University as a member of the Big Sky Conference during the 1999 NCAA Division I-AA football season. Led by second-year head coach Jerry Graybeal, the Wildcats compiled an overall record of 4–7, with a mark of 3–5 in conference play, and finished tied for fifth in the Big Sky.

== Schedule ==
Date	Opponent	Site	Result	Attendance	Source
September 2	Western State (CO)*	Stewart Stadium; Ogden, UT	W 33–3	6,412	
September 11	at Wyoming*	War Memorial Stadium; Laramie, WY	L 16–41	16,227	
September 18	Idaho State	Stewart Stadium; Ogden, UT	W 27–24	8,416	
September 25	at No. 2 Montana	Washington–Grizzly Stadium; Missoula, MT	L 22–81	18,740	
October 2	Sacramento State	Stewart Stadium; Ogden, UT	W 52–49	6,808	
October 9	at Montana State	Bobcat Stadium; Bozeman, MT	L 6–29	8,643	
October 16	Southern Utah*	Stewart Stadium; Ogden, UT (rivalry)	L 7–39	12,960	
October 23	No. 23 Portland State	Stewart Stadium; Ogden, UT	L 14–31		
October 30	at Cal State Northridge	North Campus Stadium; Northridge, CA	L 28–30	3,208	
November 6	No. 22 Northern Arizona	Stewart Stadium; Ogden, UT	W 36–19 (forfeit win)	4,110	
November 13	at Eastern Washington	Joe Albi Stadium; Spokane, WA	L 27–30	4,152	
*Non-conference game; Rankings from The Sports Network Poll released prior to the game
