= Mike Dunbar =

American football and baseball coach

Biographical details
- Born: December 31, 1948; Tacoma, Washington, U.S.
- Died: September 13, 2013 (aged 64); Dupont, Washington, U.S.

Coaching career (HC unless noted)

Football
- 1976–1978: Pacific Lutheran (assistant)
- 1980–1982: Central Washington (assistant)
- 1983: Central Washington
- 1984–1986: UMass (assistant)
- 1987–1991: Central Washington
- 1992–1993: Toledo (OC)
- 1994–1996: Toledo (AHC/OC)
- 1997–2000: Northern Iowa
- 2001: Northwestern (TE/H-backs/ST)
- 2002–2005: Northwestern (OC)
- 2006: California (OC)
- 2007–2008: Minnesota (AHC/OC)
- 2010: New Mexico State (OC)
- 2012: Northern Illinois (OC)

Baseball
- 1983: Central Washington

Head coaching record
- Overall: 83–24–1 (football); 25–20–1 (baseball)
- Tournaments: Football; 0–1 (NAIA D-I playoffs); 4–4 (NAIA D-II playoffs)

Accomplishments and honors

Championships
- 1 CFL Northern Division (1987); 4 CFA Mount Rainier League (1988–1991)

Michael L. Dunbar (December 31, 1948 – September 13, 2013) was an American football and baseball coach. He served as the head football coach at Central Washington University in 1983 and from 1987 to 1991 and at the University of Northern Iowa from 1997 to 2000, compiling a career college football coaching record of 83–24–1. Dunbar was also the head baseball coach at Central Washington for one season, in 1983, tallying mark of 25–20–1. He graduated from the University of Washington in 1972 with a B.A. in education and from Pacific Lutheran University in 1979 with an M.A. in education. Dunbar died of cancer on September 13, 2013, in his hometown of Dupont, Washington, at the age of 64.

== Head coaching record ==
=== Football ===
Year	Team	Overall	Conference	Standing	Bowl/playoffs	TSN^{#}
Central Washington Wildcats (Evergreen Conference) (1983)
1983	Central Washington	8–2	5–2	T–2nd		
Central Washington Wildcats (Columbia Football League) (1987)
1987	Central Washington	7–3	5–1	1st (Northern)	L NAIA Division I First Round	
Central Washington Wildcats (Columbia Football Association) (1988–1991)
1988	Central Washington	9–1	6–0	1st (Mount Rainier)	L NAIA Division II First Round	
1989	Central Washington	10–1–1	5–0–1	1st (Mount Rainier)	L NAIA Division II Semifinal	
1990	Central Washington	11–1	6–0	1st (Mount Rainier)	L NAIA Division II Semifinal	
1991	Central Washington	9–1	6–0	1st (Mount Rainier)	L NAIA Division II First Round	
Central Washington:		54–9–1	33–3–1			
Northern Iowa Panthers (Gateway Football Conference) (1997–2000)
1997	Northern Iowa	7–4	5–1	2nd		
1998	Northern Iowa	7–4	3–3	T–3rd		
1999	Northern Iowa	8–3	3–3	3rd		15
2000	Northern Iowa	7–4	3–3	4th		19
Northern Iowa:		29–15	14–10			
Total:		83–24–1				
National championship Conference title Conference division title or championship game berth
