= 1999 Idaho State Bengals football team =

American college football season

1999 Idaho State Bengals football
- Conference: Big Sky Conference
- Record: 4–7 (2–6 Big Sky)
- Head coach: Larry Lewis (1st season)
- Offensive scheme: Pro spread
- Defensive coordinator: James Ward (1st season)
- Base defense: 4–3
- Home stadium: Holt Arena

1999 Big Sky Conference football standings
	Conf.			Overall
Team	W		L	W		L
No. 8 Montana $^	7	–	1	9	–	3
No. 20 Portland State	6	–	2	8	–	3
Eastern Washington	6	–	2	7	–	4
Cal State Northridge	5	–	3	6	–	5
Sacramento State	3	–	5	6	–	5
Weber State	3	–	5	4	–	7
Idaho State	2	–	6	4	–	7
Montana State	2	–	6	4	–	7
No. 16 Northern Arizona ^	2	–	6	4	–	8
$ – Conference champion; ^ – NCAA Division I-AA playoff participant; Portland State games did not count in conference standings. Northern Arizona forfeited four conference wins, to Idaho State, Montana State, Weber State, Cal State Northridge.; Rankings from The Sports Network poll

The 1999 Idaho State Bengals football team represented Idaho State University as a member of the Big Sky Conference during the 1999 NCAA Division I-AA football season. Led by first-year head coach Larry Lewis, the Bengals compiled an overall record of 4–7, with a mark of 2–6 in conference play, and finished tied for seventh in the Big Sky.

== Schedule ==
Date	Opponent	Site	Result	Attendance	Source
September 4	Eastern Oregon*	Holt Arena; Pocatello, ID	W 54–28		
September 11	Fort Lewis*	Holt Arena; Pocatello, ID	W 42–3		
September 18	at Weber State	Stewart Stadium; Ogden, UT	L 24–27	8,416	
September 25	Portland State	Holt Arena; Pocatello, ID	L 13–52	5,887	
October 2	at Cal State Northridge	North Campus Stadium; Northridge, CA	L 27–41	3,500	
October 9	No. 23 Northern Arizona	Holt Arena; Pocatello, ID	W 43–28 (forfeit win)	6,572	
October 16	at Eastern Washington	Woodward Field; Cheney, WA	L 38–45	6,043	
October 23	at Southern Utah*	Eccles Coliseum; Cedar City, UT	L 47–63		
October 30	No. 5 Montana	Holt Arena; Pocatello, ID	L 23–73	4,051	
November 6	at Sacramento State	Hornet Stadium; Sacramento, CA	L 20–41	7,432	
November 13	Montana State	Holt Arena; Pocatello, ID	W 29–13	4,612	
*Non-conference game; Rankings from The Sports Network Poll released prior to the game
