= 1999 Western Illinois Leathernecks football team =

American college football season

1999 Western Illinois Leathernecks football
- Conference: Gateway Football Conference
- Record: 7–4 (2–4 Gateway)
- Head coach: Don Patterson (1st season)
- Offensive coordinator: Mark Hendrickson (1st season)
- Home stadium: Hanson Field

1999 Gateway Football Conference standings
	Conf.			Overall
Team	W		L	W		L
No. 3 Illinois State $^	6	–	0	11	–	3
No. 2 Youngstown State ^	5	–	1	12	–	3
No. 15 Northern Iowa	3	–	3	8	–	3
Western Illinois	2	–	4	7	–	4
Southwest Missouri State	2	–	4	5	–	6
Indiana State	2	–	4	3	–	8
Southern Illinois	1	–	5	5	–	6
$ – Conference champion; ^ – NCAA Division I-AA playoff participant; Rankings from The Sports Network poll

The 1999 Western Illinois Leathernecks football team represented Western Illinois University as a member of the Gateway Football Conference during the 1999 NCAA Division I-AA football season. They were led by first-year head coach Don Patterson and played their home games at Hanson Field in Macomb, Illinois. The Leathernecks finished the season with a 7–4 record overall and a 2–4 record in conference play.

== Schedule ==
Date	Opponent	Rank	Site	Result	Attendance	Source
September 2	at Northern Illinois*	No. 20	Huskie Stadium; DeKalb, IL	W 27–21	17,930	
September 11	Mississippi Valley State*	No. 18	Hanson Field; Macomb, IL	W 77–7	7,324	
September 18	vs. Nicholls State*	No. 14	Tad Gormley Stadium; New Orleans, LA	W 14–13	8,764	
September 25	at No. 18 Youngstown State	No. 13	Stambaugh Stadium; Youngstown, OH	L 24–28	16,032	
October 2	Southwest Missouri State	No. 19	Hanson Field; Macomb, IL	L 17–27	10,478	
October 9	No. 22 Elon*	No. 24	Hanson Field; Macomb, IL	W 20–14	4,027	
October 16	Southern Illinois	No. 20	Hanson Field; Macomb, IL	W 68–27	13,341	
October 23	at Indiana State	No. 19	Memorial Stadium; Terre Haute, IN	L 36–39 ^{3OT}	5,767	
November 6	at No. 11 Illinois State		Hancock Stadium; Normal, IL	L 30–38	14,108	
November 13	No. 11 Northern Iowa		Hanson Field; Macomb, IL	W 46–27	8,574	
November 20	Drake*		Hanson Field; Macomb, IL	W 24–0	2,814	
*Non-conference game; Rankings from The Sports Network Poll released prior to the game
