= Carmazzi =

Carmazzi is a surname. Notable people with the surname include:

- Arthur Francisco Carmazzi (born 1962), Italian-American writer and speaker
- Giovanni Carmazzi (born 1977), American football player
