= 1999 Southwest Texas State Bobcats football team =

American college football season

1999 Southwest Texas State Bobcats football
- Conference: Southland Football League
- Record: 3–8 (2–5 Southland)
- Head coach: Bob DeBesse (3rd season)
- Offensive coordinator: Scott Bruning (3rd season)
- Defensive coordinator: David Bailiff (3rd season)
- Home stadium: Bobcat Stadium

1999 Southland Football League standings
	Conf.			Overall
Team	W		L	W		L
No. 6 Troy State +^	6	–	1	11	–	2
No. 22 Stephen F. Austin +	6	–	1	8	–	3
McNeese State	5	–	2	6	–	5
Sam Houston State	4	–	3	6	–	5
Northwestern State	3	–	4	4	–	7
Southwest Texas State	2	–	5	3	–	8
Jacksonville State	1	–	6	2	–	9
Nicholls State	1	–	6	1	–	10
+ – Conference co-champions; ^ – NCAA Division I-AA playoff participant; Rankings from The Sports Network poll

The 1999 Southwest Texas State Bobcats football team was an American football team that represented Southwest Texas State University (now known as Texas State University) during the 1999 NCAA Division I-AA football season as a member of the Southland Football League. In their third year under head coach Bob DeBesse, the team compiled an overall record of 3–8 with a mark of 2–5 in conference play.

== Schedule ==
Date	Opponent	Site	Result	Attendance	Source
September 2	Midwestern State*	Bobcat Stadium; San Marcos, TX	W 45–3	12,889	
September 11	at No. 25 South Florida*	Raymond James Stadium; Tampa, FL	L 10–17	26,282	
September 18	at Stephen F. Austin	Homer Bryce Stadium; Nacogdoches, TX	L 17–28	9,828	
September 25	No. 17 Northern Arizona*	Bobcat Stadium; San Marcos, TX	L 26–29	9,295	
October 9	at Nicholls State	John L. Guidry Stadium; Thibodaux, LA (rivalry)	W 16–0	2,863	
October 16	No. 2 Troy State	Bobcat Stadium; San Marcos, TX	L 17–24	8,733	
October 23	at Jacksonville State	Paul Snow Stadium; Jacksonville, AL	L 10–17	7,439	
October 30	at Northwestern State	Harry Turpin Stadium; Natchitoches, LA	L 21–36	9,365	
November 6	McNeese State	Bobcat Stadium; San Marcos, TX	L 7–10	5,243	
November 13	Southern Utah*	Bobcat Stadium; San Marcos, TX	L 28–32	4,482	
November 20	Sam Houston State	Bobcat Stadium; San Marcos, TX (rivalry)	W 20–14	6,842	
*Non-conference game; Rankings from The Sports Network Poll released prior to the game
