= 1999 Sacramento State Hornets football team =

American college football season

1999 Sacramento State Hornets football
- Conference: Big Sky Conference
- Record: 6–5 (3–5 Big Sky)
- Head coach: John Volek (5th season)
- Home stadium: Hornet Stadium

1999 Big Sky Conference football standings
	Conf.			Overall
Team	W		L	W		L
No. 8 Montana $^	7	–	1	9	–	3
No. 20 Portland State	6	–	2	8	–	3
Eastern Washington	6	–	2	7	–	4
Cal State Northridge	5	–	3	6	–	5
Sacramento State	3	–	5	6	–	5
Weber State	3	–	5	4	–	7
Idaho State	2	–	6	4	–	7
Montana State	2	–	6	4	–	7
No. 16 Northern Arizona ^	2	–	6	4	–	8
$ – Conference champion; ^ – NCAA Division I-AA playoff participant; Portland State games did not count in conference standings. Northern Arizona forfeited four conference wins, to Idaho State, Montana State, Weber State, Cal State Northridge.; Rankings from The Sports Network poll

The 1999 Sacramento State Hornets football team represented California State University, Sacramento as a member of the Big Sky Conference during the 1999 NCAA Division I-AA football season. Led by fifth-year head coach John Volek, Sacramento State compiled an overall record of 6–5 with a mark of 3–5 in conference play, tying for fifth place in the Big Sky. The team outscored its opponents 414 to 310 for the season. The Hornets played home games at Hornet Stadium in Sacramento, California.

== Schedule ==
Date	Opponent	Rank	Site	Result	Attendance	Source
September 4	Saint Mary's*		Hornet Stadium; Sacramento, CA	W 41–7	12,778	
September 11	at No. 3 Montana		Washington–Grizzly Stadium; Missoula, MT	L 39–41 ^{2OT}	18,648	
September 18	No. 11 (D-II) UC Davis*		Hornet Stadium; Sacramento, CA (Causeway Classic)	W 48–27	20,993	
September 25	Montana State		Hornet Stadium; Sacramento, CA	W 41–10	9,488	
October 2	at Weber State	No. 24	Stewart Stadium; Ogden, UT	L 49–52	6,808	
October 9	No. 20 Portland State		Hornet Stadium; Sacramento, CA	W 41–14	8,643	
October 16	at Cal State Northridge	No. 23	North Campus Stadium; Northridge, CA	L 14–36	5,183	
October 23	Northern Arizona		Hornet Stadium; Sacramento, CA	L 49–51 ^{3OT}	7,136	
October 30	at Eastern Washington		Woodward Field; Cheney, WA	L 21–26	3,357	
November 6	Idaho State		Hornet Stadium; Sacramento, CA	W 41–20	7,432	
November 20	at Cal Poly*		Mustang Stadium; San Luis Obispo, CA	W 31–26	4,826	
*Non-conference game; Rankings from The Sports Network Poll released prior to the game

== Roster ==
1999 Sacramento State Hornets football team roster
Players
Coaches
Offense

Pos.	#	Name	Class
RB	1	Leukamian Davis	So
RB	2	David Crump	Sr
WR	3	Lamont Webb	Jr
WR	4	Clint Simpson	Fr
OL	61	Kevin Harrington	Jr
OL	64	Doug Hollingsworth	Sr
OL	68	Tim Sowards	So
OL	69	Dan Phelps	So
OL	70	Terence Wagner	So
OL	73	Lonie Paxton	Sr
OL	74	Grant Hagen	Fr
OL	75	Chris Frank	Fr
OL	78	Guillermo Lopez	Sr
OL	79	Jon Osterhout	Sr
TE	80	Jamie Smith	Fr
TE	81	Bobby Brown	Fr
TE	84	Christian Kelly	Sr
WR	85	Mike Johnson, Jr.	Fr
TE	86	Joe Knapp	So
TE	87	Matt Loomis	So
WR	88	Eric Frazer	Sr
TE	89	Russell Gardner	Fr

Defense

Pos.	#	Name	Class
DL	77	Trent Lastinger	Sr
DL	53	Manny Darzins	Sr
DL	90	Allen McCoy	So
DL	91	Joe Dorcoo	Sr
DL	92	Chris Garnto	Fr
DL	93	Tyler Padovan	Fr
DL	94	Adam Roth	Fr
DL	95	Antione Alderson	Sr
DL	96	Drew Bogetti	So
DL	97	James Peterson	Fr
DL	98	Derek Miller	Fr
DL	99	Jeff Nelson	Jr

Special teams

Pos.	#	Name	Class

Head coach

- John Volek

Coordinators/assistant coaches

Legend

- (C) Team captain
- (S) Suspended
- (I) Ineligible
- Injured
- Redshirt

Roster
Last update: 1999-10-22

== Team players in the NFL ==
No Sacramento State players were selected in the 2000 NFL draft.

The following finished their college career in 1999, were not drafted, but played in the NFL.

Player	Position	First NFL team
Lonie Paxton	Center	2000 New England Patriots
