= 1999 Eastern Washington Eagles football team =

American college football season

1999 Eastern Washington Eagles football
- Conference: Big Sky Conference
- Record: 7–4 (6–2 Big Sky)
- Head coach: Mike Kramer (6th season)
- Home stadium: Woodward Field; Joe Albi Stadium

1999 Big Sky Conference football standings
	Conf.			Overall
Team	W		L	W		L
No. 8 Montana $^	7	–	1	9	–	3
No. 20 Portland State	6	–	2	8	–	3
Eastern Washington	6	–	2	7	–	4
Cal State Northridge	5	–	3	6	–	5
Sacramento State	3	–	5	6	–	5
Weber State	3	–	5	4	–	7
Idaho State	2	–	6	4	–	7
Montana State	2	–	6	4	–	7
No. 16 Northern Arizona ^	2	–	6	4	–	8
$ – Conference champion; ^ – NCAA Division I-AA playoff participant; Portland State games did not count in conference standings. Northern Arizona forfeited four conference wins, to Idaho State, Montana State, Weber State, Cal State Northridge.; Rankings from The Sports Network poll

The 1999 Eastern Washington Eagles football team represented Eastern Washington University as a member of the Big Sky Conference during the 1999 NCAA Division I-AA football season. Led by sixth-year head coach Mike Kramer, the Eagles compiled an overall record of 7–4, with a mark of 6–2 in conference play, and finished tied for second in the Big Sky.

== Schedule ==
Date	Opponent	Site	Result	Attendance	Source
September 2	Idaho*	Joe Albi Stadium; Spokane, WA	L 21–48	9,694	
September 11	Central Washington*	Woodward Field; Cheney, WA	W 44–14	5,160	
September 16	at Portland State	Civic Stadium; Portland, OR	L 39–48	7,448	
September 25	Cal State Northridge	Woodward Field; Cheney, WA	W 48–41	3,556	
October 2	at No. 15 Northern Arizona	Walkup Skydome; Flagstaff, AZ	W 14–10	12,863	
October 9	at Boise State*	Bronco Stadium; Boise, ID	L 7–41	21,981	
October 16	Idaho State	Woodward Field; Cheney, WA	W 45–38	6,043	
October 23	at No. 4 Montana	Washington–Grizzly Stadium; Missoula, MT (EWU–UM Governors Cup)	L 7–25	18,847	
October 30	Sacramento State	Woodward Field; Cheney, WA	W 26–21	3,357	
November 6	at Montana State	Bobcat Stadium; Bozeman, MT	W 45–23	5,537	
November 13	Weber State	Joe Albi Stadium; Spokane, WA	W 30–27	4,152	
*Non-conference game; Rankings from The Sports Network Poll released prior to the game
