= 1999 Cal Poly Mustangs football team =

American college football season

1999 Cal Poly Mustangs football
- Conference: Independent
- Record: 3–8
- Head coach: Larry Welsh (3rd season)
- Home stadium: Mustang Stadium

1999 NCAA Division I-AA independents football standings
	Conf.			Overall
Team	W		L	W		L
No. 5 Hofstra ^		–		11	–	2
No. 21 Elon		–		9	–	2
Davidson		–		8	–	3
Southern Utah		–		8	–	3
No. 23 South Florida		–		7	–	4
Samford		–		7	–	4
St. Johns (NY)		–		7	–	4
Morehead State		–		5	–	5
Charleston Southern		–		4	–	6
Liberty		–		4	–	7
Jacksonville		–		3	–	6
Cal Poly		–		3	–	8
Austin Peay		–		3	–	8
Saint Mary's		–		2	–	9
^ – NCAA Division I-AA playoff participant; Rankings from The Sports Network poll

The 1999 Cal Poly Mustangs football team represented California Polytechnic State University, San Luis Obispo as an independent during the 1999 NCAA Division I-AA football season. Led by third-year head coach Larry Welsh, Cal Poly compiled a record of 3–8 for the second consecutive year. The team was outscored by its opponents 345 to 246 for the season. The Mustangs played home games at Mustang Stadium in San Luis Obispo, California.

== Schedule ==
Date	Opponent	Site	Result	Attendance	Source
September 9	at No. 21 Northern Arizona	Walkup Skydome; Flagstaff, AZ	L 21–55	6,821	
September 18	No. 18 Montana State	Mustang Stadium; San Luis Obispo, CA	W 40–37	6,723	
September 25	at No. 6 Hofstra	James M. Shuart Stadium; Hempstead, NY	L 3–38	3,628	
October 2	Southern Utah	Mustang Stadium; San Luis Obispo, CA	W 38–10	5,798	
October 9	at No. 9 Northern Iowa	UNI-Dome; Cedar Falls, IA	L 21–42	14,292	
October 16	at No. 10 Youngstown State	Stambaugh Stadium; Youngstown, OH	L 7–10	19,682	
October 23	at No. 8 (D-II) UC Davis	Toomey Field; Davis, CA (rivalry)	L 24–31	9,225	
October 30	No. 17 Portland State	Mustang Stadium; San Luis Obispo, CA	L 28–42	7,058	
November 6	No. 5 Montana	Mustang Stadium; San Luis Obispo, CA	L 14–28	5,720	
November 13	at Saint Mary's	Saint Mary's Stadium; Moraga, CA	W 24–21	1,127	
November 20	Sacramento State	Mustang Stadium; San Luis Obispo, CA	L 26–31	4,826	
Rankings from The Sports Network Poll released prior to the game
