= 1999 Samford Bulldogs football team =

American college football season

1999 Samford Bulldogs football
- Conference: Independent
- Record: 7–4
- Head coach: Pete Hurt (6th season)
- Offensive coordinator: Joel Williams (1st season)
- Defensive coordinator: Pete Hurt (7th season)
- Home stadium: Seibert Stadium

1999 NCAA Division I-AA independents football standings
	Conf.			Overall
Team	W		L	W		L
No. 5 Hofstra ^		–		11	–	2
No. 21 Elon		–		9	–	2
Davidson		–		8	–	3
Southern Utah		–		8	–	3
No. 23 South Florida		–		7	–	4
Samford		–		7	–	4
St. Johns (NY)		–		7	–	4
Morehead State		–		5	–	5
Charleston Southern		–		4	–	6
Liberty		–		4	–	7
Jacksonville		–		3	–	6
Cal Poly		–		3	–	8
Austin Peay		–		3	–	8
Saint Mary's		–		2	–	9
^ – NCAA Division I-AA playoff participant; Rankings from The Sports Network poll

The 1999 Samford Bulldogs football team represented Samford University as an independent during the 1999 NCAA Division I-AA football season. Led by sixth-year head coach Pete Hurt, the Bulldogs compiled an overall record of 7–4. The team played home games at Seibert Stadium in Homewood, Alabama.

== Schedule ==
Date	Time	Opponent	Site	Result	Attendance	Source
September 2	6:00 p.m.	Chattanooga	Seibert Stadium; Homewood, AL	L 27–29	6,340	
September 11		at Austin Peay	Governors Stadium; Clarksville, TN	W 51–0	3,052	
September 18		at Tennessee–Martin	Pacer Stadium; Martin, TN	W 32–7		
September 25		Eastern Kentucky	Seibert Stadium; Homewood, AL	L 16–17		
October 2	1:00 p.m.	Jacksonville State	Seibert Stadium; Homewood, AL (rivalry)	W 34–18	7,340	
October 16		Elon	Seibert Stadium; Homewood, AL	L 31–34 ^{2OT}		
October 21		at Murray State	Roy Stewart Stadium; Murray, KY	L 27–34		
October 30		Liberty	Seibert Stadium; Homewood, AL	W 35–28		
November 6		at Western Carolina	E. J. Whitmire Stadium; Cullowhee, NC	W 35–32 ^{OT}		
November 13		at Nicholls State	John L. Guidry Stadium; Thibodaux, LA	W 28–24		
November 18		Tennessee Tech	Seibert Stadium; Homewood, AL	W 19–15		
All times are in Central time
