= 1999 Montana State Bobcats football team =

American college football season

1999 Montana State Bobcats football
- Conference: Big Sky Conference
- Record: 3–8 (2–6 Big Sky)
- Head coach: Cliff Hysell (8th season)
- Home stadium: Martell Field

1999 Big Sky Conference football standings
	Conf.			Overall
Team	W		L	W		L
No. 8 Montana $^	7	–	1	9	–	3
No. 20 Portland State	6	–	2	8	–	3
Eastern Washington	6	–	2	7	–	4
Cal State Northridge	5	–	3	6	–	5
Sacramento State	3	–	5	6	–	5
Weber State	3	–	5	4	–	7
Idaho State	2	–	6	4	–	7
Montana State	2	–	6	4	–	7
No. 16 Northern Arizona ^	2	–	6	4	–	8
$ – Conference champion; ^ – NCAA Division I-AA playoff participant; Portland State games did not count in conference standings. Northern Arizona forfeited four conference wins, to Idaho State, Montana State, Weber State, Cal State Northridge.; Rankings from The Sports Network poll

The 1999 Montana State Bobcats football team was an American football team that represented Montana State University in the Big Sky Conference during the 1999 NCAA Division I-AA football season. In their eighth and final season under head coach Cliff Hysell, the Bobcats compiled a 3–8 record (2–6 against Big Sky opponents) and finished in a three-way tie for last place in the Big Sky. The Bobcats dropped their 14th consecutive game in the Montana–Montana State football rivalry. The team played its home games at the newly christened Martell Field.

== Schedule ==
Date	Opponent	Rank	Site	Result	Attendance	Source
September 4	Chadron State*		Martell Field; Bozeman, MT	W 20–10	8,037	
September 11	Western New Mexico*	No. 22	Martell Field; Bozeman, MT	W 65–8	6,927	
September 18	at Cal Poly*	No. 18	Mustang Stadium; San Luis Obispo, CA	L 37–40	6,723	
September 25	at Sacramento State		Hornet Stadium; Sacramento, CA	L 10–41	9,488	
October 9	Weber State^{†}		Martell Field; Bozeman, MT	W 29–6	8,643	
October 16	at Portland State		Civic Stadium; Portland, OR	L 28–49		
October 23	Cal State Northridge		Martell Field; Bozeman, MT	L 21–24	10,007	
October 30	at No. 24 Northern Arizona		Walkup Skydome; Flagstaff, AZ	L 20–49	4,044	
November 6	Eastern Washington		Martell Field; Bozeman, MT	L 23–45	5,537	
November 13	at Idaho State		Holt Arena; Pocatello, ID	L 13–29	4,612	
November 20	No. 7 Montana		Martell Field; Bozeman, MT (rivalry)	L 3–49	15,007	
*Non-conference game; ^{†}Homecoming; Rankings from The Sports Network Poll released prior to the game
