= 1999 Stephen F. Austin Lumberjacks football team =

American college football season

1999 Stephen F. Austin Lumberjacks football

Southland co-champion
- Conference: Southland Conference

Ranking
- Sports Network: No. 22
- Record: 8–3 (6–1 SLC)
- Head coach: Mike Santiago (1st season)
- Home stadium: Homer Bryce Stadium

1999 Southland Football League standings
| | Conf. | | | Overall |
| Team | W | | L | W | | L |
|---|---|---|---|---|---|---|
| No. 6 Troy State +^ | 6 | – | 1 | 11 | – | 2 |
| No. 22 Stephen F. Austin + | 6 | – | 1 | 8 | – | 3 |
| McNeese State | 5 | – | 2 | 6 | – | 5 |
| Sam Houston State | 4 | – | 3 | 6 | – | 5 |
| Northwestern State | 3 | – | 4 | 4 | – | 7 |
| Southwest Texas State | 2 | – | 5 | 3 | – | 8 |
| Jacksonville State | 1 | – | 6 | 2 | – | 9 |
| Nicholls State | 1 | – | 6 | 1 | – | 10 |
+ – Conference co-champions; ^ – NCAA Division I-AA playoff participant; Rankings from The Sports Network poll

The 1999 Stephen F. Austin Lumberjacks football team was an American football team that represented Stephen F. Austin State University as a member of the Southland Conference during the 1999 NCAA Division I-AA football season. In their first year under head coach Mike Santiago, the team compiled an overall record of 8–3, with a mark of 6–1 in conference play, and finished as Southland co-champion.

== Schedule ==
| Date | Opponent | Rank | Site | Result | Attendance | Source |
|---|---|---|---|---|---|---|
| September 4 | Abilene Christian* | | Homer Bryce Stadium; Nacogdoches, TX | W 51–34 | | |
| September 11 | at Utah State* | | Romney Stadium; Logan, UT | L 17–51 | 17,489 | |
| September 18 | Southwest Texas State | | Homer Bryce Stadium; Nacogdoches, TX | W 28–17 | 9,828 | |
| October 2 | at New Hampshire* | | Cowell Stadium; Durham, NH | L 28–38 | 5,010 | |
| October 9 | McNeese State | | Homer Bryce Stadium; Nacogdoches, TX | W 40–14 | | |
| October 16 | at Sam Houston State | | Bowers Stadium; Huntsville, TX (rivalry) | W 45–31 | 12,031 | |
| October 23 | Nicholls State | | Homer Bryce Stadium; Nacogdoches, TX | W 38–7 | 12,738 | |
| October 30 | Jacksonville State | No. 22 | Homer Bryce Stadium; Nacogdoches, TX | W 33–16 | 4,133 | |
| November 6 | at No. 1 Troy State | No. 19 | Veterans Memorial Stadium; Troy, AL | L 7–27 | 17,122 | |
| November 13 | Wingate* | No. 25 | Homer Bryce Stadium; Nacogdoches, TX | W 73–11 | | |
| November 20 | at Northwestern State | No. 23 | Harry Turpin Stadium; Natchitoches, LA (rivalry) | W 29–14 | 6,313 | |
*Non-conference game; Rankings from The Sports Network Poll released prior to the game
