= 1999 Sam Houston State Bearkats football team =

American college football season

1999 Sam Houston State Bearkats football
- Conference: Southland Conference
- Record: 6–5 (4–3 Southland)
- Head coach: Ron Randleman (18th season)
- Defensive coordinator: Mike Lucas (10th season)
- Home stadium: Bowers Stadium

1999 Southland Football League standings
	Conf.			Overall
Team	W		L	W		L
No. 6 Troy State +^	6	–	1	11	–	2
No. 22 Stephen F. Austin +	6	–	1	8	–	3
McNeese State	5	–	2	6	–	5
Sam Houston State	4	–	3	6	–	5
Northwestern State	3	–	4	4	–	7
Southwest Texas State	2	–	5	3	–	8
Jacksonville State	1	–	6	2	–	9
Nicholls State	1	–	6	1	–	10
+ – Conference co-champions; ^ – NCAA Division I-AA playoff participant; Rankings from The Sports Network poll

The 1999 Sam Houston State Bearkats football team represented Sam Houston State University as a member of the Southland Conference during the 1999 NCAA Division I-AA football season. Led by 18th-year head coach Ron Randleman, the Bearkats compiled an overall record of 6–5 with a mark of 4–3 in conference play, and finished fourth in the Southland.

== Schedule ==
Date	Opponent	Site	Result	Attendance	Source
September 2	Delta State*	Bowers Stadium; Huntsville, TX	W 38–31	9,038	
September 11	at Louisiana Tech*	Joe Aillet Stadium; Ruston, LA	L 17–55	16,621	
September 25	at Texas A&M–Kingsville*	Javelina Stadium; Kingsville, TX	W 34–23	7,234	
October 2	at Arkansas State*	Indian Stadium; Jonesboro, AR	L 20–45	13,041	
October 9	Jacksonville State	Bowers Stadium; Huntsville, TX	W 51–17	5,667	
October 16	Stephen F. Austin	Bowers Stadium; Huntsville, TX (Battle of the Piney Woods)	L 31–45	12,031	
October 23	at No. 1 Troy State	Veterans Memorial Stadium; Troy, AL	L 16–41	17,426	
October 30	at McNeese State	Cowboy Stadium; Lake Charles, LA	W 20–3	11,020	
November 6	Nicholls State	Bowers Stadium; Huntsville, TX	W 69–17	6,269	
November 13	Northwestern State	Bowers Stadium; Huntsville, TX	W 21–0	6,221	
November 20	at Southwest Texas State	Bobcat Stadium; San Marcos, TX (rivalry)	L 14–20	6,020	
*Non-conference game; Rankings from The Sports Network Poll released prior to the game
