= Mike Williams (American football coach) =

American football coach (born 1954)

Biographical details
- Born: May 11, 1954 (age 72); Greenville, Alabama, U.S.
- Education: Troy State (1977)

Coaching career (HC unless noted)
- 1980: Samson HS (AL)
- 1981: Conecuh County HS (AL)
- 1982–1983: Samson HS (AL)
- 1984–1986: Carroll HS (AL) (assistant)
- 1987–1989: Andalusia HS (AL)
- 1990–1996: Southern Miss (RB)
- 1997–1999: Jacksonville State
- 2005: Greenville HS (AL)
- 2006: UT Martin (RB)

Head coaching record
- Overall: 9–17 (college); 47–34 (high school)

Mike Williams (born May 11, 1954) is an American former football player and coach. He served as the head football coach at Jacksonville State University from 1997 to his resignation in 1999, and compiled a record of 9–17. Williams was also an assistant coach at the University of Southern Mississippi and the University of Tennessee at Martin, as well as the head football coach at several Alabama high schools during the 1980s.

== Coaching career ==
Williams' first head coaching position was at Samson High School in 1980. He led the Tigers to an overall record of ten wins and one loss and to the state playoffs for the first time in school history. After a single season at Conecuh County High School in 1981 where he led the school to a record of seven wins and three losses he returned to Samson. In his second stint at Samson, Williams led the Tigers to a record of ten wins and ten losses in the 1982 and 1983 seasons. From Samson, Williams served as an assistant coach at Carroll High School from 1984 to 1986. At Andalusia High School from 1987 to 1989, Williams compiled an overall record of 18 wins and 12 losses.

Williams got his first college coaching job at Southern Miss in 1990. After Curley Hallman left the Golden Eagles for LSU, Williams was the only assistant that stayed at Southern Miss under newly hired head coach Jeff Bower. Williams remained at Southern Miss through their 1996 season as a running backs coach. On December 20, 1996, Williams was formally introduced as head coach at Jacksonville State. Williams abruptly resigned after the fourth game of the Gamecocks' 1999 season. His all-time record at Jacksonville State was 9 wins and 17 losses.

After remaining out of coaching for nearly six years, Williams accepted the position of head coach at Greenville High School. During his lone season with the Tigers, Williams let Greenville to a record of two wins and eight losses. In 2006, former Williams assistant at Jacksonville State Jason Simpson hired him to serve as running backs coach at UT Martin.

== Head coaching record ==
=== College ===
Year	Team	Overall	Conference	Standing	Bowl/playoffs
Jacksonville State Gamecocks (Southland Conference) (1997–1999)
1997	Jacksonville State	1–10	1–6	8th	
1998	Jacksonville State	7–4	4–3	4th	
1999	Jacksonville State	1–3 (Note: Williams served as Jacksonville State's head coach for the first four games of the 1999 season before resigning. Jeff Richards was appointed interim head coach for the remainder of the season. The Gamecocks finished the year with an overall record of 2–9 and a mark of 1–6 in conference play, tying for seventh place in the Southland Conference.)	0–1		
Jacksonville State:		9–17	5–10		
Total:		9–17			
