= 1999 Liberty Flames football team =

American college football season

1999 Liberty Flames football
- Conference: Independent
- Record: 4–7
- Head coach: Sam Rutigliano (11th season)
- Home stadium: Williams Stadium

1999 NCAA Division I-AA independents football standings
	Conf.			Overall
Team	W		L	W		L
No. 5 Hofstra ^		–		11	–	2
No. 21 Elon		–		9	–	2
Davidson		–		8	–	3
Southern Utah		–		8	–	3
No. 23 South Florida		–		7	–	4
Samford		–		7	–	4
St. Johns (NY)		–		7	–	4
Morehead State		–		5	–	5
Charleston Southern		–		4	–	6
Liberty		–		4	–	7
Jacksonville		–		3	–	6
Cal Poly		–		3	–	8
Austin Peay		–		3	–	8
Saint Mary's		–		2	–	9
^ – NCAA Division I-AA playoff participant; Rankings from The Sports Network poll

The 1999 Liberty Flames football team represented Liberty University as an independent during the 1999 NCAA Division I-AA football season. Led by 11th-year head coach Sam Rutigliano, the Flames compiled an overall record of 4–7. Liberty played home games at Williams Stadium in Lynchburg, Virginia.

== Schedule ==
Date	Time	Opponent	Site	Result	Attendance	Source
September 4		Virginia Union	Williams Stadium; Lynchburg, VA	W 21–12		
September 11	7:00 pm	at Marshall	Marshall University Stadium; Huntington, WV	L 3–63	26,374	
September 18		at Tennessee Tech	Tucker Stadium; Cookeville, TN	L 15–18	5,688	
September 25		Fayetteville State	Williams Stadium; Lynchburg, VA	W 48–14	9,321	
October 2		Johnson C. Smith	Williams Stadium; Lynchburg, VA	W 38–2		
October 9	7:00 pm	at No. 20 South Florida	Raymond James Stadium; Tampa, FL	L 0–28	25,112	
October 16		at No. 13 East Tennessee State	Memorial Center; Johnson City, TN	L 12–24	8,467	
October 23	1:30 pm	at Charleston Southern	Buccaneer Field; N. Charleston, SC	W 34–14	1,879	
October 30		at Samford	Seibert Stadium; Homewood, AL	L 28–35		
November 6		No. 22 Elon	Williams Stadium; Lynchburg, VA	L 14–38	3,931	
November 20		No. 3 Appalachian State	Williams Stadium; Lynchburg, VA	L 12–28	7,313	
Rankings from The Sports Network Poll released prior to the game; All times are in Eastern time
