= 1999 South Florida Bulls football team =

American college football season

1999 South Florida Bulls football
- Conference: Independent
- Record: 7–4
- Head coach: Jim Leavitt (3rd season)
- Offensive coordinator: Mike Canales (3rd season)
- Offensive scheme: Pro-style
- Defensive coordinator: Rick Kravitz (3rd season)
- Base defense: 3–4
- Home stadium: Raymond James Stadium

1999 NCAA Division I-AA independents football standings
	Conf.			Overall
Team	W		L	W		L
No. 5 Hofstra ^		–		11	–	2
No. 21 Elon		–		9	–	2
Davidson		–		8	–	3
Southern Utah		–		8	–	3
No. 23 South Florida		–		7	–	4
Samford		–		7	–	4
St. Johns (NY)		–		7	–	4
Morehead State		–		5	–	5
Charleston Southern		–		4	–	6
Liberty		–		4	–	7
Jacksonville		–		3	–	6
Cal Poly		–		3	–	8
Austin Peay		–		3	–	8
Saint Mary's		–		2	–	9
^ – NCAA Division I-AA playoff participant; Rankings from The Sports Network poll

The 1999 South Florida Bulls football team represented the University of South Florida (USF) as an independent during the 1999 NCAA Division I-AA football season. Led by third-year head coach Jim Leavitt, the Bulls compiled a record of 7–4. South Florida played home games at Raymond James Stadium in Tampa, Florida. Cornerback William Pukylo team with eight interceptions and was named South Florida's defensive player of the year.

== Schedule ==
Date	Time	Opponent	Rank	Site	TV	Result	Attendance	Source
September 4	9:00 p.m.	at San Diego State	No. 23	Qualcomm Stadium; San Diego, CA	ESPNGP	L 12–41	25,576	
September 11	7:00 p.m.	Southwest Texas State	No. 25	Raymond James Stadium; Tampa, FL	WMOR	W 17–10	26,282	
September 18	7:00 p.m.	at Western Kentucky	No. 21	L. T. Smith Stadium; Bowling Green, KY		W 21–6	7,500	
September 25	7:00 p.m.	at No. 5 Troy State	No. 16	Veterans Memorial Stadium; Troy, AL	WMOR	L 24–41	17,311	
October 2	7:00 p.m.	Southern Illinois	No. 23	Raymond James Stadium; Tampa, FL		W 21–14	25,029	
October 9	7:00 p.m.	Liberty	No. 21	Raymond James Stadium; Tampa, FL		W 28–0	25,112	
October 16	7:00 p.m.	No. 6 Illinois State	No. 19	Raymond James Stadium; Tampa, FL	WMOR	W 14–13	22,054	
October 23	7:00 p.m.	New Hampshire	No. 17	Raymond James Stadium; Tampa, FL	SCF	W 42–41 ^{OT}	24,004	
October 30	1:30 p.m.	at No. 10 James Madison	No. 16	Bridgeforth Stadium; Harrisonburg, VA	SCF	L 3–13	15,000	
November 6	7:00 p.m.	New Haven	No. 21	Raymond James Stadium; Tampa, FL		W 41–27	27,307	
November 13	7:00 p.m.	No. 6 Hofstra	No. 18	Raymond James Stadium; Tampa, FL		L 23–42	25,583	
Rankings from The Sports Network Poll released prior to the game; All times are in Eastern time

== Roster ==
1999 South Florida Bulls football team roster
Players			Coaches
Offense: Pos. / # / Name / Class	Defense: Pos. / # / Name / Class; CB / / William Pukylo	Special teams: Pos. / # / Name / Class; K / 7 / Bill Gramatica / Jr	Head coach: Jim Leavitt; Coordinators/assistant coaches Legend: (C) Team captain; (S) Suspended; (I) Ineligible; Injured; Redshirt; Roster
