= 1999 Charleston Southern Buccaneers football team =

American college football season

1999 Charleston Southern Buccaneers football
- Conference: Independent
- Record: 4–6
- Head coach: David Dowd (9th season)
- Defensive coordinator: Todd Knight (2nd season)
- Home stadium: Buccaneer Field

1999 NCAA Division I-AA independents football standings
| | Conf. | | | Overall |
| Team | W | | L | W | | L |
|---|---|---|---|---|---|---|
| No. 5 Hofstra ^ | | – | | 11 | – | 2 |
| No. 21 Elon | | – | | 9 | – | 2 |
| Davidson | | – | | 8 | – | 3 |
| Southern Utah | | – | | 8 | – | 3 |
| No. 23 South Florida | | – | | 7 | – | 4 |
| Samford | | – | | 7 | – | 4 |
| St. Johns (NY) | | – | | 7 | – | 4 |
| Morehead State | | – | | 5 | – | 5 |
| Charleston Southern | | – | | 4 | – | 6 |
| Liberty | | – | | 4 | – | 7 |
| Jacksonville | | – | | 3 | – | 6 |
| Cal Poly | | – | | 3 | – | 8 |
| Austin Peay | | – | | 3 | – | 8 |
| Saint Mary's | | – | | 2 | – | 9 |
^ – NCAA Division I-AA playoff participant; Rankings from The Sports Network poll

The 1999 Charleston Southern Buccaneers football team represented Charleston Southern University as an independent during the 1999 NCAA Division I-AA football season. Led by ninth-year head coach David Dowd, the Buccaneers compiled a record of 4–6. Charleston Southern played home games at Buccaneer Field in North Charleston, South Carolina.

== Schedule ==
| Date | Time | Opponent | Site | Result | Attendance | Source |
|---|---|---|---|---|---|---|
| September 4 | | at South Carolina State | Oliver C. Dawson Stadium; Orangeburg, SC | L 14–20 | | |
| September 11 | 6:00 pm | Presbyterian | Buccaneer Field; North Charleston, SC | L 14–20 | 2,743 | |
| September 25 | 1:30 pm | at Wofford | Gibbs Stadium; Spartanburg, SC | L 13–25 | 5,248 | |
| October 2 | 1:30 pm | Lenoir–Rhyne | Buccaneer Field; North Charleston, SC | W 14–7 ^{OT} | 2,917 | |
| October 9 | 7:00 pm | at Newberry | Setzler Field; Newberry, SC | L 26–27 | 3,200 | |
| October 16 | 1:30 pm | Austin Peay | Buccaneer Field; North Charleston, SC | W 39–17 | 1,687 | |
| October 23 | 1:30 pm | Liberty | Buccaneer Field; North Charleston, SC | L 14–34 | 1,879 | |
| October 30 | 2:00 pm | at Elon | Burlington Memorial Stadium; Elon, NC | L 13–38 | 6,831 | |
| November 6 | 1:30 pm | Tusculum | Buccaneer Field; North Charleston, SC | W 35–21 | 3,879 | |
| November 20 | 1:00 pm | at Jacksonville | D. B. Milne Field; Jacksonville, FL | W 37–17 | 1,164 | |
All times are in Eastern time
