= Jeff Richards (American football coach) =

American football coach

Biographical details
- Born: Panama City, Florida, U.S.
- Education: Livingston (1987)

Coaching career (HC unless noted)
- 1988: Southern Miss (GA)
- 1989–1990: Southern Miss (DL/ST)
- 1991–1992: Arkansas State (DL)
- 1993–1995: Arkansas State (DE)
- 1996: Arkansas State (AHC/LB)
- 1997: Southeast Missouri State (OL)
- 1998–1999: Jacksonville State (AHC/OL)
- 1999: Jacksonville State (Interim HC)
- 2000: Tennessee–Martin (AHC/DC/LB)
- 2001–2004: Nicholls State (OC)

Head coaching record
- Overall: 1–6

Jeff Richards is an American former football coach who was best known for his tenure as interim head football coach at Jacksonville State University after Mike Williams resigned after their fourth game during the 1999 season. Prior to serving as interim head coach for the Gamecocks, Richards served as an assistant coach for Southern Miss, Arkansas State, and Southeast Missouri State.

After his tenure with Jacksonville State, Richards served as an assistant coach at UT Martin and Nicholls State. After his coaching career, Richards started his own contractor business in Thibodaux, Louisiana.

== Head coaching record ==
Year	Team	Overall	Conference	Standing	Bowl/playoffs
Jacksonville State Gamecocks (Southland Conference) (1999)
1999	Jacksonville State	1–6 (Note: Mike Williams served as Jacksonville State's head coach for the first four games of the 1999 season before resigning. Richards was appointed interim head coach for the remainder of the season. The Gamecocks finished the year with an overall record of 2–9 and a mark of 1–6 in conference play.)	1–5	T–7th	
Jacksonville State:		1–6	1–5		
Total:		1–6			
