= Texas State Bobcats football statistical leaders =

The Texas State Bobcats football statistical leaders are individual statistical leaders of the Texas State Bobcats football program in various categories, including passing, rushing, receiving, total offense, defensive stats, and kicking. Within those areas, the lists identify single-game, single-season, and career leaders. The Bobcats currently represent Texas State University (TXST) in the NCAA Division I FBS Pac-12 Conference.

Although Texas State began competing in intercollegiate football in 1904, the school's official record book considers the "modern era" to have begun in 1950. Records from before this year are often incomplete and inconsistent, and they are generally not included in these lists.

These lists are dominated by more recent players for several reasons:

- Since 1950, seasons have increased from 10 games to 11 and then 12 games in length.
- The NCAA didn't allow freshmen to play varsity football until 1972 (with the exception of the World War II years), allowing players to have four-year careers.
- Bowl games in Division I FBS, as well as postseason games in all lower NCAA divisions (Division I FCS, Division II, Division III), were not included in official season statistics until 2002. Most programs internally follow this practice. The only Bobcats statistics affected are those for the Division II playoffs, in which TXST played three times, winning two national championships and amassing a 6–1 record. TXST played in FCS (formerly Division I-AA) from 1987–2012, but did not make the playoffs at that level until 2005. Since moving to FBS in 2013, TXST has played in three bowl games.
- Due to COVID-19 issues, the NCAA ruled that the 2020 season would not count against the athletic eligibility of any football player, giving everyone who played in that season the opportunity for five years of eligibility instead of the normal four.
- From 2018 through 2025, FBS players were allowed to participate in as many as four games in a redshirt season; previously, playing in even one game "burned" the redshirt. In 2024 and 2025, postseason games did not count against the four-game limit. These changes to redshirt rules gave players during this period several extra games to accumulate statistics.
- A more recent change that will have a major effect on future career leaderboards was introduced in 2026 with full implementation starting with the 2027 freshman class. Going forward, redshirting will be prohibited, but players will have five years of full athletic eligibility, provided that they are no older than 19 when they first enroll in a postsecondary institution. Players who had remaining eligibility under previous rules at the end of the 2025 season will benefit from the new rule.

These lists are updated through Week 7 of the 2026 season. Players active for TXST in 2026 are in bold.

== Passing ==
=== Passing yards ===
Career
Rk	Player	Yards	Years
1	Bradley George	9,556	2006 2007 2008 2009
2	Tyler Jones	8,480	2013 2014 2015 2016
3	Barrick Nealy	7,206	2003 2004 2005
4	David Williams	6,677	1994 1995 1996 1997
5	**Brad Jackson**	4,994	2024 2025 2026
6	Tyler Vitt	4,483	2018 2019 2020 2021
7	Mike Miller	4,446	1978 1979 1980 1981
8	Pence Dacus	3,904	1951 1952 1953
9	James Duncan	3,670	1968 1969 1970 1971
10	Jess Perkins	3,655	1964 1965 1966 1967

Single season
Rk	Player	Yards	Year
1	TJ Finley	3,439	2023
2	Jordan McCloud	3,227	2024
3	**Brad Jackson**	3,224	2025
4	Barrick Nealy	3,129	2003
5	Bradley George	3,121	2009
6	Barrick Nealy	2,875	2005
7	Tyler Jones	2,670	2014
8	Bradley George	2,660	2008
9	Layne Hatcher	2,653	2022
10	Tyler Jones	2,484	2015

Single game
Rk	Player	Yards	Year	Opponent
1	Tyler Jones	475	2016	Incarnate Word
2	**Brad Jackson**	444	2025	Marshall
3	Brady McBride	443	2020	Arkansas State
4	Bradley George	418	2008	Stephen F. Austin
	Tyler Jones	418	2016	Ohio
6	Barrick Nealy	400	2005	Georgia Southern
7	Barrick Nealy	398	2003	Angelo State
8	Gresch Jensen	394	2019	Wyoming
9	Barrick Nealy	384	2003	UC Davis
10	Barrick Nealy	378	2005	Texas A&M

=== Passing touchdowns ===
Career
Rk	Player	TDs	Years
1	Bradley George	76	2006 2007 2008 2009
2	Tyler Jones	55	2013 2014 2015 2016
3	Barrick Nealy	52	2003 2004 2005
4	David Williams	45	1994 1995 1996 1997
5	**Brad Jackson**	37	2024 2025 2026
6	Pence Dacus	32	1951 1952 1953
7	Mike Miller	31	1978 1979 1980 1981
8	Tyler Vitt	30	2018 2019 2020 2021
9	Jordan McCloud	30	2024
10	Brady McBride	29	2020 2021

Single season
Rk	Player	TDs	Year
1	Jordan McCloud	30	2024
2	Bradley George	26	2008
3	TJ Finley	24	2023
4	Bradley George	23	2009
5	Tyler Jones	22	2014
6	Barrick Nealy	21	2003
	Barrick Nealy	21	2005
	**Brad Jackson**	21	2025
9	Layne Hatcher	19	2022
10	David Williams	18	1995

== Rushing ==
=== Rushing yards ===
Career
Rk	Player	Yards	Years
1	Claude Mathis	4,694	1994 1995 1996 1997
2	Kevin Jurgajtis	3,205	1974 1975 1976 1977
3	Karrington Bush	3,193	2007 2008 2009 2010
4	Robert Lowe	3,027	2012 2013 2014 2015
5	Bronson Sanders	2,940	1998 1999 2000 2001
6	Josh Brown	2,909	1969 1970 1971 1972
7	Lee Davis	2,511	1999 2000 2001 2002
8	Reggie Rivers	2,507	1987 1988 1989 1990
9	Ricky Sanders	2,461	1980 1981 1982 1983
10	Lincoln Pare	2,454	2022 2024 2025

Single season
Rk	Player	Yards	Year
1	Claude Mathis	1,595	1997
2	Claude Mathis	1,593	1996
3	Donald Wilkerson	1,569	1994
4	Ismail Mahdi	1,331	2023
5	Claude Mathis	1,289	1995
6	Roy Jackson	1,187	1986
7	Reggie Rivers	1,145	1990
8	Lincoln Pare	1,128	2025
9	Robert Lowe	1,091	2014
10	Karrington Bush	1,065	2008

Single game
Rk	Player	Yards	Year	Opponent
1	Claude Mathis	310	1996	Stephen F. Austin
2	Claude Mathis	308	1997	Jacksonville State
3	Paul Darby	287	1978	Prairie View A&M
4	Terrence Franks	284	2014	Idaho
5	Lee Davis	283	2001	Arkansas-Monticello
6	Monroe Daniels	257	1971	McMurry
7	Robert Lowe	248	2015	South Alabama
8	Terrell Harris	246	2003	Sam Houston State
9	Robert Lowe	236	2014	Arkansas State
10	Walter Hatfield	235	1973	Tarleton State

=== Rushing touchdowns ===
Career
Rk	Player	TDs	Years
1	Claude Mathis	45	1994 1995 1996 1997
2	Josh Brown	34	1969 1970 1971 1972
3	Mike Miller	33	1978 1979 1980 1981
4	Robert Lowe	29	2012 2013 2014 2015
5	Kevin Jurgajtis	28	1974 1975 1976 1977
5	Lee Davis	28	1999 2000 2001 2002
5	**Brad Jackson**	28	2024 2025 2026
8	Donnie Williams	26	1979 1980 1981
9	Eric Cobble	25	1982 1983 1984 1985
9	Lincoln Pare	25	2022 2024 2025

Single season
Rk	Player	TDs	Year
1	**Brad Jackson**	17	2025
2	Claude Mathis	16	1996
3	Donnie Williams	15	1981
4	Claude Mathis	14	1997
5	Josh Brown	13	1971
5	Barrick Nealy	13	2005
7	Josh Brown	12	1970
7	Ron Jacoby	12	1982
7	Todd Scott	12	1991
7	Lee Davis	12	2002
7	Nick Session	12	2005
7	Robert Lowe	12	2014
7	Lincoln Pare	12	2025

Single game
Rk	Player	TDs	Year	Opponent
1	Eric Cobble	4	1982	Howard Payne
1	Ron Jacoby	4	1982	Sam Houston State
1	Lee Davis	4	2001	Arkansas-Monticello
1	Terrell Harris	4	2004	Appalachian State
1	Stan Zwinggi	4	2007	Cal Poly
1	Robert Lowe	4	2014	Arkansas State
1	**Torrance Burgess Jr.**	4	2026	Colorado State

== Receiving ==
=== Receptions ===
Career
Rk	Player	Rec	Years
1	Johnny Parker	160	1969 1970 1971
2	Da'Marcus Griggs	154	2007 2008 2009 2010
3	Joey Hobert	146	2023 2024
4	**Chris Dawn Jr.**	145	2023 2024 2025 2026
5	Cameron Luke	142	2006 2007 2008
6	Ashtyn Hawkins	141	2021 2022 2023
7	**Beau Sparks**	130	2024 2025 2026
8	D'Angelo Torres	122	1997 1998 1999
9	Tyson Olivo	121	1998 1999 2000 2001
10	Hutch White	116	2017 2018 2019

Single season
Rk	Player	Rec	Year
1	**Beau Sparks**	84	2025
2	Da'Marcus Griggs	80	2009
3	Joey Hobert	76	2023
4	Cameron Luke	73	2008
5	Joey Hobert	70	2024
6	Hutch White	67	2019
7	Kole Wilson	66	2023
8	Da'Marcus Griggs	65	2010
	**Chris Dawn Jr.**	65	2025
10	K. R. Carpenter	60	2003
	Cameron Luke	60	2007

Single game
Rk	Player	Rec	Year	Opponent
1	Ashtyn Hawkins	13	2022	Baylor
	Joey Hobert	13	2023	Georgia Southern
3	Johnny Parker	12	1969	Angelo State
	James Stewart	12	1998	Troy State

=== Receiving yards ===
Career
Rk	Player	Yards	Years
1	Johnny Parker	2,479	1969 1970 1971
2	Cameron Luke	2,431	2006 2007 2008
3	David Vela	2,110	1979 1980 1981 1982
4	**Chris Dawn Jr.**	2,003	2023 2024 2025 2026
5	Da'Marcus Griggs	1,990	2007 2008 2009 2010
6	**Beau Sparks**	1,829	2024 2025 2026
7	Ashtyn Hawkins	1,745	2021 2022 2023
8	Javen Banks	1,646	2018 2019 2020 2021 2022
9	Daren Dillard	1,586	2008 2009 2010
10	Joey Hobert	1,575	2023 2024

Single season
Rk	Player	Yards	Year
1	Cameron Luke	1,268	2008
2	**Beau Sparks**	1,200	2025
3	Cameron Luke	1,035	2007
4	**Chris Dawn Jr.**	1,007	2025
5	David Vela	971	1981
6	Da'Marcus Griggs	969	2009
7	Johnny Parker	927	1969
8	Da'Marcus Griggs	920	2010
9	Joey Hobert	895	2023
10	Ashtyn Hawkins	874	2023

Single game
Rk	Player	Yards	Year	Opponent
1	Da'Marcus Griggs	205	2010	Nicholls State
2	Terrance Hatton	197	1995	Southern Utah
3	A. J. Johnson	196	1988	Lamar
4	Johnny Parker	189	1970	Sam Houston State
5	Mishak Rivas	188	2008	Stephen F. Austin
6	**Beau Sparks**	186	2025	Louisiana
7	Cameron Luke	185	2008	Southeastern Louisiana
8	'**Chris Dawn Jr.**	180	2025	Marshall
9	Da'Marcus Griggs	178	2009	Sam Houston State
10	**Beau Sparks**	168	2025	Marshall

=== Receiving touchdowns ===
Career
Rk	Player	TDs	Years
1	Cameron Luke	32	2006 2007 2008
2	Javen Banks	20	2018 2019 2020 2021 2022
3	Johnny Parker	19	1969 1970 1971
4	David Vela	17	1979 1980 1981 1982
5	Daren Dillard	16	2008 2009 2010
5	Marcell Barbee	16	2020 2021 2022
5	Joey Hobert	16	2023 2024
8	Billy Dunk	15	1977 1978 1979 1980
9	Da'Marcus Griggs	14	2007 2008 2009 2010
9	**Chris Dawn Jr.**	14	2023 2024 2025 2026
9	**Beau Sparks**	14	2024 2025 2026

Single season
Rk	Player	TDs	Year
1	Cameron Luke	17	2008
2	Cameron Luke	12	2007
3	David Vela	11	1981
4	Marcell Barbee	10	2020
	**Beau Sparks**	10	2025
6	Johnny Parker	8	1969
	Billy Dunk	8	1978
	Da'Marcus Griggs	8	2009
	Joey Hobert	8	2023
	Kole Wilson	8	2023
	Joey Hobert	8	2024

Single game
Rk	Player	TDs	Year	Opponent
1	Cameron Luke	4	2007	Stephen F. Austin
	**Beau Sparks**	4	2025	Eastern Michigan

== Total offense ==
Total offense is the sum of passing and rushing statistics. It does not include receiving or returns.

=== Total offense yards ===
Career
Rk	Player	Yards	Years
1	Tyler Jones	9,889	2013 2014 2015 2016
2	Bradley George	9,786	2006 2007 2008 2009
3	Barrick Nealy	8,933	2003 2004 2005
4	David Williams	7,093	1994 1995 1996 1997
5	**Brad Jackson**	6,450	2024 2025 2026
6	Mike Miller	6,249	1978 1979 1980 1981
7	Tyler Vitt	5,169	2018 2019 2020 2021
8	Jess Perkins	5,030	1964 1965 1966 1967
9	Claude Mathis	4,694	1994 1995 1996 1997
10	Shaun Rutherford	4,410	2011 2012

Single season
Rk	Player	Yards	Year
1	**Brad Jackson**	3,968	2025
2	Barrick Nealy	3,932	2005
3	TJ Finley	3,520	2023
4	Jordan McCloud	3,505	2024
5	Barrick Nealy	3,390	2003
6	Tyler Jones	3,209	2014
7	Bradley George	3,147	2009
8	Tyler Jones	3,067	2015
9	Shaun Rutherford	2,734	2012
10	Bradley George	2,679	2008

Single game
Rk	Player	Yards	Year	Opponent
1	Barrick Nealy	526	2005	Georgia Southern

=== Touchdowns responsible for ===
"Touchdowns responsible for" is the official NCAA term for combined passing and rushing touchdowns.

Career
Rk	Player	TDs	Years
1	Bradley George	79	2006 2007 2008 2009
2	Tyler Jones	76	2013 2014 2015 2016
3	Barrick Nealy	70	2003 2004 2005
4	**Brad Jackson**	65	2024 2025 2026
5	Mike Miller	64	1978 1979 1980 1981
6	David Williams	59	1994 1995 1996 1997
7	Claude Mathis	49	1994 1995 1996 1997

Single season
Rk	Player	TDs	Year
1	**Brad Jackson**	38	2025
2	Jordan McCloud	37	2024
3	Barrick Nealy	34	2005
4	TJ Finley	29	2023
5	Tyler Jones	28	2014
6	Bradley George	26	2008
7	Mike Miller	25	1981
8	Barrick Nealy	24	2003
	Tyler Jones	24	2015
10	Bradley George	23	2009

== Defense ==
=== Interceptions ===
Career
Rk	Player	Ints	Years
1	Mac Sauls	25	1964 1965 1966 1967
2	David Glasco	17	1982 1983 1984
3	Ricky West	11	1968 1969 1970 1971
	Adrian Simpson	11	1980 1981 1982 1983
5	Bobby McBride	10	1954 1955
	Don Caldwell	10	1968 1969 1970
	Leon Savage	10	1973 1974 1975 1976
	Keith Frase	10	1975 1976 1977 1978

Single season
Rk	Player	Ints	Year
1	Lee Lundin	9	1986
2	Mac Sauls	8	1965
	Don Caldwell	8	1969
	Adrian Simpson	8	1983
5	Ricky West	7	1971
	David Glasco	7	1984
7	Mac Sauls	6	1966

Single game
Rk	Player	Ints	Year	Opponent
1	Bobby Smith	3	1965	Texas A&M - Commerce
	Ronnie Kuhn	3	1977	Angelo State
	David Glasco	3	1982	Angelo State
	Dexter Robinson	3	1985	Northwestern State
	Lee Lundin	3	1986	Rice

=== Tackles ===
Career
Rk	Player	Tackles	Years
1	Bryan London	458	2016 2017 2018 2019
2	Greg Pitts	447	1999 2000 2001 2002
3	Brad Fulks	441	1985 1986 1987 1988
4	Shawn Woods	389	1984 1985 1986 1987
5	Myron Coleman	388	1998 1999 2000 2001
6	Cyril Friday	362	1980 1981 1982 1983
7	Cliffton Black	361	1995 1996 1997 1998 1999
8	Sterling Rogers	335	1998 1999 2000 2001
9	Glenn Mangold	322	1986 1987 1988 1989
10	Jeremy Castillo	320	2003 2004 2005 2006

Single season
Rk	Player	Tackles	Year
1	Chad Coleman	175	1990
2	Ypres Thomas	164	1996
3	David Mayo	154	2014
4	Bryan London	141	2016
5	Brad Fulks	138	1988
6	Tommy Blair	133	1969
	Brad Fulks	133	1987
8	Cleve Tryon	127	1990
	Greg Pitts	127	2002
10	David Gaffney	126	1993

=== Sacks ===
Career
Rk	Player	Sacks	Years
1	C.J. Carroll	32.0	1997 1998 1999 2000
2	Rod Clark	27.5	1981 1982 1983
3	Cyril Friday	24.5	1980 1981 1982 1983
4	Greg Pitts	23.5	1999 2000 2001 2002
5	Monte Lewis	22.5	1991 1992 1993 1994
6	Glenn Mangold	21.5	1986 1987 1988 1989
7	Mike Langford	16.0	1980 1981 1982
8	Ben Bell	15.5	2022 2023 2024
9	Clint Bendele	13.5	1996 1997 1998 1999
	Kalil Alexander	13.5	2023 2024 2025

Single season
Rk	Player	Sacks	Year
1	Rod Clark	12.0	1982
2	Michael Ebbitt	11.5	2011
3	C. J. Carroll	11.0	1999
	C. J. Carroll	11.0	2000
5	Monte Lewis	10.0	1993
	Ben Bell	10.0	2023
7	Rod Clark	9.5	1981
	Cyril Friday	9.5	1982
9	Glenn Mangold	9.0	1987
	John Douglass	9.0	1992
	Brad Schley	9.0	1997
	Michael Odiari	9.0	2014

== Kicking ==
=== Field goals made ===
Career
Rk	Player	FGs	Years
1	Seth Keller	37	2020 2021 2022
2	Ray Whitehead	36	1991 1992 1993 1994
	Will Johnson	36	2011 2012 2013 2014
4	Andrew Ireland	34	2006 2007 2008
5	Mason Shipley	31	2022 2023 2024
6	Justin Martinez	29	1999 2000 2001 2002
7	Neal Neunhoffer	25	1981 1982 1983 1984
8	Robbie Roberson	22	1990 1991
9	Tyler Robles	21	2025
10	David Wuest	19	1970 1971 1972 1973
	Terry Whitman	19	1977 1978 1979 1980

Single season
Rk	Player	FGs	Year
1	Tyler Robles	21	2025
2	Seth Keller	15	2021
	Mason Shipley	15	2023
	Mason Shipley	15	2024
5	Robbie Roberson	14	1990
	Andrew Ireland	14	2008
	Seth Keller	14	2022
8	Ray Whitehead	13	1993
	Will Johnson	13	2011
	Joshua Rowland	13	2019

Single game
Rk	Player	FGs	Year	Opponent
1	James Sherman	5	2018	Texas Southern
2	Jason Howes	4	1989	Lamar
	Robbie Roberson	4	1990	McNeese State
	Matthew Wieland	4	1995	Texas A&M - Kingsville
	Jason Dann	4	2013	South Alabama
	Will Johnson	4	2014	Georgia Southern

=== Field goal percentage ===
Career
Rk	Player	FG%	Years
1	Tyler Robles	91.3%	2025
2	Mason Shipley	88.6%	2022 2023 2024
3	Seth Keller	86.0%	2020 2021 2022
4	Ray Whitehead	80.0%	1991 1992 1993 1994
5	Andrew Ireland	79.1%	2006 2007 2008

Single season
Rk	Player	FG%	Year
1	Mason Shipley	100.0%	2023
2	Andrew Ireland	91.7%	2006
3	Tyler Robles	91.3%	2025
4	Seth Keller	87.5%	2022
5	Matthew Wieland	85.7%	1996
6	Ray Whitehead	84.6%	1992
7	Seth Keller	85.2%	2021
8	Andrew Ireland	82.4%	2008
9	Ross Doctoroff	81.8%	1998
10	Terry Whitman	80.0%	1979
