= 1997 Sam Houston State Bearkats football team =

American college football season

1997 Sam Houston State Bearkats football
- Conference: Southland Conference
- Record: 5–6 (3–4 Southland)
- Head coach: Ron Randleman (16th season)
- Defensive coordinator: Mike Lucas (8th season)
- Home stadium: Bowers Stadium

1997 Southland Football League standings
	Conf.			Overall
Team	W		L	W		L
No. 7 McNeese State +^	6	–	1	13	–	2
No. 21 Northwestern State +^	6	–	1	8	–	4
No. 13 Stephen F. Austin	5	–	2	8	–	3
Sam Houston State	3	–	4	5	–	6
Nicholls State	3	–	4	5	–	6
Southwest Texas State	2	–	5	5	–	6
Troy State	2	–	5	5	–	6
Jacksonville State	1	–	6	1	–	10
+ – Conference co-champions; ^ – NCAA Division I-AA playoff participant; Rankings from The Sports Network poll

The 1997 Sam Houston State Bearkats football team represented Sam Houston State University as a member of the Southland Conference during the 1997 NCAA Division I-AA football season. Led by 16th-year head coach Ron Randleman, the Bearkats compiled an overall record of 5–6 with a mark of 3–4 in conference play, and finished tied for fourth in the Southland.

== Schedule ==
Date	Time	Opponent	Site	Result	Attendance	Source
August 30		Angelo State*	Bowers Stadium; Huntsville, TX	L 17–24	10,217	
September 6	4:00 p.m.	at Texas A&M*	Kyle Field; College Station, TX	L 6–59	58,619	
September 13	7:00 p.m.	Jacksonville State	Bowers Stadium; Huntsville, TX	L 21–28	8,036	
September 20		Arkansas–Monticello*	Bowers Stadium; Huntsville, TX	W 55–0	10,055	
September 27		at Texas Southern*	Robertson Stadium; Houston, TX	W 40–7	4,040	
October 11		at No. 19 Troy State	Veterans Memorial Stadium; Troy, AL	L 10–13 ^{OT}	5,013	
October 18		No. 15 Nicholls State	Bowers Stadium; Huntsville, TX	W 24–17	10,024	
November 1		at No. 9 McNeese State	Cowboy Stadium; Lake Charles, LA	L 21–38	10,238	
November 8		No. 7 Stephen F. Austin	Bowers Stadium; Huntsville, TX (Battle of the Piney Woods)	W 33–28	11,033	
November 15		No. 25 Northwestern State	Bowers Stadium; Huntsville, TX	L 19–35	4,019	
November 22		at Southwest Texas State	Bobcat Stadium; San Marcos, TX (rivalry)	W 35–30		
*Non-conference game; Rankings from The Sports Network Poll released prior to the game
