= 1970 Sam Houston State Bearkats football team =

American college football season

1970 Sam Houston State Bearkats football
- Conference: Lone Star Conference
- Record: 8–2–1 (7–2 LSC)
- Head coach: Tom Page (3rd season)
- Home stadium: Pritchett Field

1970 Lone Star Conference football standings
	Conf.					Overall
Team	W		L		T	W		L		T
No. 1/7 Texas A&I $^	8	–	1	–	0	11	–	1	–	0
No. NR / T–20 Sam Houston State	7	–	2	–	0	8	–	2	–	1
Sul Ross	6	–	3	–	0	7	–	3	–	0
Angelo State	6	–	3	–	0	6	–	4	–	0
Southwest Texas State	4	–	5	–	0	6	–	5	–	0
Howard Payne	4	–	5	–	0	5	–	5	–	0
East Texas State	4	–	5	–	0	5	–	6	–	0
McMurry	4	–	5	–	0	5	–	6	–	0
Tarleton State	1	–	8	–	0	1	–	8	–	0
Stephen F. Austin	1	–	8	–	0	1	–	9	–	0
$ – Conference champion; ^ – NAIA Division I playoff participant; Rankings from NAIA Division I poll and AP small college poll

The 1970 Sam Houston State Bearkats football team represented Sam Houston State University as a member of the Lone Star Conference (LSC) during the 1970 NAIA Division I football season. Led by third-year head coach Tom Page, the Bearkats compiled an overall record of 8–2–1 with a mark of 7–2 in conference play, and finished second in the LSC.

== Schedule ==
Date	Opponent	Site	Result	Source
September 12	at Troy State*	Rip Hewes Stadium; Dothan, AL	T 20–20	
September 19	at McNeese State*	Cowboy Stadium; Lake Charles, LA	W 24–19	
September 26	East Texas State	Pritchett Field; Huntsville, TX	W 23–0	
October 3	Sul Ross	Pritchett Field; Huntsville, TX	L 18–50	
October 10	at Angelo State	San Angelo Stadium; San Angelo, TX	W 27–15	
October 17	Tarleton State	Pritchett Field; Huntsville, TX	W 48–7	
October 24	Southwest Texas State	Pritchett Field; Huntsville, TX	W 25–24	
October 31	at Howard Payne	Brownwood, TX	W 27–7	
November 7	at No. 12 Texas A&I	Javelina Stadium; Kingsville, TX	L 14–31	
November 14	McMurry	Pritchett Field; Huntsville, TX	W 33–14	
November 21	at Stephen F. Austin	Memorial Stadium; Nacogdoches, TX (rivalry)	W 25–18	
*Non-conference game; Rankings from AP Poll released prior to the game
