= T. J. Finley =

American football player (born 2002)

Dallas Renegades
- Position: Quarterback

Personal information
- Born: March 25, 2002 (age 24); Ponchatoula, Louisiana, U.S.
- Listed height: 6 ft 7 in (2.01 m)
- Listed weight: 246 lb (112 kg)

Career information
- High school: Ponchatoula High School (Ponchatoula, Louisiana)
- College: LSU (2020); Auburn (2021–2022); Texas State (2023); Western Kentucky (2024); Georgia State (2025)
- NFL draft: 2026: undrafted

Career history
- Nashville Kats (2027)*; Dallas Renegades (2027–present)
- * Offseason or practice squad member only
- Stats at ESPN

Tyler Jamal Finley (born March 25, 2002) is an American football quarterback for the Dallas Renegades of the United Football League (UFL). He played college football for LSU, Auburn, Texas State, Western Kentucky, and Georgia State.

== Early life ==
Finley grew up in Ponchatoula, Louisiana, and attended Ponchatoula High School. He passed for 2,736 yards with 23 touchdowns and five interceptions in his junior season. As a senior, Finley passed for 2,738 yards and 21 touchdowns and also scored eight rushing touchdowns. Finley was rated a three-star prospect and the best quarterback prospect in the state and committed to play college football at LSU as a sophomore in high school over offers from Oregon, Alabama, and Auburn.

== College career ==
=== LSU ===
Finley signed his National Letter of Intent with LSU on December 18, 2019, and enrolled at the university as an early enrollee on January 18, 2020.

Finley entered the 2020 season as the backup to starting quarterback Myles Brennan. Brennan suffered a season-ending abdominal injury in LSU’s third game of the season, and following the team’s bye week, Finley was named the starter by head coach Ed Orgeron for the Tigers’ October 24 game against South Carolina. In his first career start, which also marked his collegiate debut, Finley completed 17 of 21 pass attempts for 265 yards with two touchdowns and one interception and rushed for 24 yards and a touchdown, as LSU defeated South Carolina 52–24.

Finley started five games during the season and compiled a 2–3 record as LSU’s starter. He was later benched in favor of true freshman Max Johnson for the Tigers’ final two games. Finley finished the season completing 80 of 140 passes for 941 yards, five touchdowns, and five interceptions.

In 2021, amid a three-way quarterback competition in spring practice with Brennan and Johnson, Finley announced he would be entering the transfer portal on May 6, 2021.

=== Auburn ===
On May 24, 2021, Finley announced he would be transferring to Auburn over offers from Alabama, Penn State, and Houston.

Finley began the 2021 season as the backup to Bo Nix. He made his Auburn debut against Akron, scoring a rushing touchdown, and the following week threw a passing touchdown against Alabama State. In Week 4, Finley entered the game in the fourth quarter for a benched Nix and threw the game-winning touchdown versus Georgia State, helping the Tigers avoid an upset. After Nix suffered a season-ending injury against Mississippi State, Finley started the final three games of the season, going 0–3, including a Birmingham Bowl appearance against Houston.

On August 4, 2022, prior to the start of the season, Finley was arrested on a misdemeanor warrant for eluding police officers on two separate occasions while riding his motorcycle without a helmet in the city of Auburn.

Finley was named Auburn's starting quarterback for the Tigers' opening game of the 2022 season, having beaten out Oregon transfer Robby Ashford and Texas A&M transfer Zach Calzada for the starting job. He started Week 1 against Mercer, completing nine of 14 passes for 112 yards with one touchdown and two interceptions in a victory. He started the following week against San Jose State, throwing for 167 yards and one interception in a 24–16 win. In Week 3, Finley suffered a Grade 2 AC sprain against Penn State in a loss and was replaced by Ashford. His only other appearance came four weeks later against Ole Miss.

On May 2, 2023, Finley announced his intention to enter the transfer portal for a second time. He later earned his degree from Auburn University and participated in the school's 2023 Summer Commencement ceremony.

=== Texas State ===
On May 12, 2023, Finley transferred to Texas State, joining the program under first-year head coach G. J. Kinne. Finley won the starting quarterback job and opened the season against Baylor, leading Texas State to a 42–31 road upset. In the victory, he threw for 298 yards and three touchdowns while adding 18 rushing yards and a rushing touchdown. For his performance, Finley was named Sun Belt Offensive Player of the Week.

Finley led the Bobcats to their first bowl appearance in program history, a victory over Rice in the First Responder Bowl. Texas State finished the season with an 8–5 overall record, setting a program record for most wins in a single season as an FBS member and securing its first winning season since 2014. On the season, Finley completed 279 of 414 passes for 3,439 yards and a program-record 24 passing touchdowns, along with eight interceptions, while also rushing for five touchdowns. He recorded five 300-yard passing games and threw three touchdown passes in five separate contests.

On January 16, 2024, Finley entered the transfer portal for a third time.

=== Western Kentucky ===
On January 22, 2024, Finley transferred to Western Kentucky to play under head coach Tyson Helton. Finley won the starting quarterback job during preseason camp, with Caden Veltkamp serving as his primary backup. He made his Hilltoppers debut in the season opener against No. 5 Alabama, throwing for 92 yards and two interceptions in a 63–0 loss. The following week, Finley rebounded by throwing for 351 yards and a touchdown in a 31–0 victory over Eastern Kentucky. In Week 3, Finley suffered a season-ending leg injury in the first half against Middle Tennessee, which required surgery.

On December 7, 2024, Finley announced that he would enter the transfer portal for a fourth time.

=== Tulane ===
On December 16, 2024, Finley transferred to Tulane, joining head coach Jon Sumrall. On April 4, 2025, he was suspended indefinitely from the Tulane football team following his arrest on a charge of illegal possession of stolen property involving a Dodge Ram truck valued at more than $25,000. He entered the transfer portal again on April 25, 2025.

=== Georgia State ===
On August 27, 2025, Finley transferred to Georgia State, joining head coach Dell McGee. He made his debut just 11 days later, starting against Memphis immediately after the team had played its first game of the season, where he threw for 201 yards and one interception in a 38–16 loss. During the season, Finley appeared in seven games and made six starts, often splitting time at quarterback with Cameron Brown. He finished the year with 1,244 passing yards, six touchdowns, and seven interceptions.

On December 15, 2025, Finley entered the transfer portal for the sixth time to join a 7th team.

=== Incarnate Word ===
On January 14, 2026, Finley signed with FCS program Incarnate Word, which would have marked Finley's seventh different college football program across seven seasons. However, on March 25, Finley announced he would be entering the 2026 NFL draft instead of returning to college football for another season.

=== Statistics ===
Season	Team	Games			Passing								Rushing			
Season	Team	GP	GS	Record	Cmp	Att	Pct	Yds	Y/A	TD	Int	Rtg	Att	Yds	Avg	TD
2020	LSU	5	5	2–3	80	140	57.1	941	6.7	5	5	118.2	29	34	1.2	1
2021	Auburn	9	3	0–3	70	128	54.7	827	6.5	6	1	122.9	20	−36	−1.8	1
2022	Auburn	4	3	2–1	33	53	62.3	431	8.1	1	4	121.7	17	33	1.9	1
2023	Texas State	13	13	8–5	279	414	67.4	3,439	8.3	24	8	152.4	78	69	0.9	5
2024	Western Kentucky	3	3	2–1	48	75	64.0	491	6.5	1	2	117.9	11	20	1.8	0
2025	Georgia State	7	6	1–5	127	201	63.2	1,244	6.2	6	7	118.1	28	−51	−1.8	0
Career		41	33	15–18	637	1,011	63.0	7,372	7.3	43	27	133.0	183	69	0.4	8

== Professional career ==
=== Nashville Kats ===
On October 19th, 2026, Finley signed with the Nashville Kats of Arena Football One.

=== Dallas Renegades ===
On October 28th, 2026, Finley signed with the Dallas Renegades of the United Football League after attending a league showcase event in Atlanta.
