= 1971 Sam Houston State Bearkats football team =

American college football season

1971 Sam Houston State Bearkats football
- Conference: Lone Star Conference
- Record: 4–7 (3–6 LSC)
- Head coach: Tom Page (4th season)
- Home stadium: Pritchett Field

1971 Lone Star Conference football standings
	Conf.					Overall
Team	W		L		T	W		L		T
No. 3 Howard Payne +	7	–	1	–	1	10	–	1	–	1
No. 4 Southwest Texas State +	7	–	1	–	1	8	–	1	–	1
No. 13 Texas A&I	7	–	2	–	0	7	–	3	–	0
Angelo State	6	–	3	–	0	7	–	3	–	0
East Texas State	5	–	4	–	0	6	–	5	–	0
Sul Ross	3	–	6	–	0	4	–	6	–	1
Sam Houston State	3	–	6	–	0	4	–	7	–	0
Tarleton State	2	–	7	–	0	3	–	7	–	0
McMurry	2	–	7	–	0	2	–	8	–	0
Stephen F. Austin	2	–	7	–	0	2	–	8	–	0
+ – Conference co-champions; Rankings from NAIA Division I poll

The 1971 Sam Houston State Bearkats football team represented Sam Houston State University as a member of the Lone Star Conference (LSC) during the 1971 NAIA Division I football season. Led by fourth-year head coach Tom Page, the Bearkats compiled an overall record of 4–7 with a mark of 3–6 in conference play, and finished tied for sixth in the LSC.

== Schedule ==
Date	Opponent	Site	Result	Source
September 11	at Lamar*	Cardinal Stadium; Beaumont, TX	W 13–12	
September 18	McNeese State*	Pritchett Field; Huntsville, TX	L 13–15	
September 25	at East Texas State	Memorial Stadium; Commerce, TX	L 6–21	
October 2	at Sul Ross	Jackson Field; Alpine, TX	L 16–20	
October 9	Angelo State	Pritchett Field; Huntsville, TX	W 13–6	
October 16	at Tarleton State	Memorial Stadium; Stephenville, TX	W 16–0	
October 23	at Southwest Texas State	Evans Field; San Marcos, TX	L 7–10	
October 30	Howard Payne	Pritchett Field; Huntsville, TX	L 17–35	
November 6	Texas A&I	Pritchett Field; Huntsville, TX	L 7–10	
November 13	at McMurry	Shotwell Stadium; Abilene, TX	W 24–7	
November 20	Stephen F. Austin	Pritchett Field; Huntsville, TX (rivalry)	L 6–10	
*Non-conference game
