= 1997 Stephen F. Austin Lumberjacks football team =

American college football season

1997 Stephen F. Austin Lumberjacks football
- Conference: Southland Conference

Ranking
- Sports Network: No. 13
- Record: 8–3 (5–2 SLC)
- Head coach: John Pearce (6th season)
- Home stadium: Homer Bryce Stadium

1997 Southland Football League standings
	Conf.			Overall
Team	W		L	W		L
No. 7 McNeese State +^	6	–	1	13	–	2
No. 21 Northwestern State +^	6	–	1	8	–	4
No. 13 Stephen F. Austin	5	–	2	8	–	3
Sam Houston State	3	–	4	5	–	6
Nicholls State	3	–	4	5	–	6
Southwest Texas State	2	–	5	5	–	6
Troy State	2	–	5	5	–	6
Jacksonville State	1	–	6	1	–	10
+ – Conference co-champions; ^ – NCAA Division I-AA playoff participant; Rankings from The Sports Network poll

The 1997 Stephen F. Austin Lumberjacks football team was an American football team that represented Stephen F. Austin State University as a member of the Southland Conference during the 1997 NCAA Division I-AA football season. In their sixth year under head coach John Pearce, the team compiled an overall record of 8–3, with a mark of 5–2 in conference play, and finished third in the Southland.

== Schedule ==
Date	Opponent	Rank	Site	Result	Attendance	Source
August 28	West Texas A&M*	No. 15	Homer Bryce Stadium; Nacogdoches, TX	W 35–17		
September 6	Delta State*	No. 15	Homer Bryce Stadium; Nacogdoches, TX	W 38–3		
September 13	at No. 1 Montana*	No. 14	Washington–Grizzly Stadium; Missoula, MT	L 10–24	18,730	
September 27	New Hampshire*	No. 17	Homer Bryce Stadium; Nacogdoches, TX	W 17–14		
October 11	Jacksonville State	No. 13	Homer Bryce Stadium; Nacogdoches, TX	W 41–15	6,217	
October 18	at No. 16 Troy State	No. 12	Veterans Memorial Stadium; Troy, AL	W 20–13		
October 25	No. 2 McNeese State	No. 10	Homer Bryce Stadium; Nacogdoches, TX	W 13–7	17,387	
November 1	Southwest Texas State	No. 7	Homer Bryce Stadium; Nacogdoches, TX	W 31–28		
November 8	at Sam Houston State	No. 7	Bowers Stadium; Huntsville, TX (rivalry)	L 28–33	11,033	
November 15	Nicholls State	No. 14	Homer Bryce Stadium; Nacogdoches, TX	W 39–7		
November 20	at No. 21 Northwestern State	No. 13	Harry Turpin Stadium; Natchitoches, LA (rivalry)	L 24–38		
*Non-conference game; Rankings from The Sports Network Poll released prior to the game
