= 1969 Sam Houston State Bearkats football team =

American college football season

1969 Sam Houston State Bearkats football
- Conference: Lone Star Conference
- Record: 3–6–1 (2–4–1 LSC)
- Head coach: Tom Page (2nd season)
- Home stadium: Pritchett Field

1969 Lone Star Conference football standings
| | Conf. | | | | | Overall |
| Team | W | | L | | T | W | | L | | T |
|---|---|---|---|---|---|---|---|---|---|---|
| No. 1/11 Texas A&I +^ | 6 | – | 1 | – | 0 | 11 | – | 1 | – | 0 |
| East Texas State + | 6 | – | 1 | – | 0 | 7 | – | 3 | – | 0 |
| Stephen F. Austin | 5 | – | 2 | – | 0 | 7 | – | 3 | – | 0 |
| Southwest Texas State | 3 | – | 4 | – | 0 | 3 | – | 6 | – | 1 |
| Sul Ross | 3 | – | 3 | – | 1 | 4 | – | 5 | – | 1 |
| Sam Houston State | 2 | – | 4 | – | 1 | 3 | – | 6 | – | 1 |
| Howard Payne | 2 | – | 5 | – | 0 | 4 | – | 7 | – | 0 |
| McMurry | 1 | – | 6 | – | 0 | 2 | – | 8 | – | 0 |
| Angelo State * | 0 | – | 0 | – | 0 | 6 | – | 4 | – | 0 |
| Tarleton State * | 0 | – | 0 | – | 0 | 1 | – | 9 | – | 0 |
+ – Conference co-champions; ^ – NAIA playoff participant * – did not complete for conference title; Rankings from NAIA poll and AP small college poll

The 1969 Sam Houston State Bearkats football team represented Sam Houston State College (now known as Sam Houston State University) as a member of the Lone Star Conference (LSC) during the 1969 NAIA football season. Led by second-year head coach Tom Page, the Bearkats compiled an overall record of 3–6–1 with a mark of 2–4–1 in conference play, and finished sixth in the LSC.

== Schedule ==
| Date | Opponent | Site | Result | Source |
|---|---|---|---|---|
| September 20 | at Southwestern State (OK)* | Milam Stadium; Weatherford, OK | L 0–31 | |
| September 27 | at Tarleton State* | Memorial Stadium; Stephenville, TX | W 29–7 | |
| October 4 | No. 17 Troy State* | Pritchett Field; Huntsville, TX | L 14–24 | |
| October 11 | Howard Payne | Pritchett Field; Huntsville, TX | W 23–0 | |
| October 18 | McMurry | Pritchett Field; Huntsville, TX | W 35–13 | |
| October 25 | at Southwest Texas State | Evans Field; San Marcos, TX | L 21–24 | |
| November 1 | Stephen F. Austin | Pritchett Field; Huntsville, TX (rivalry) | L 28–38 | |
| November 8 | at East Texas State | Memorial Stadium; Commerce, TX | L 28–42 | |
| November 15 | No. 10 Texas A&I | Pritchett Field; Huntsville, TX | L 21–28 | |
| November 22 | at Sul Ross | Jackson Field; Alpine, TX | T 21–21 | |
*Non-conference game; Rankings from AP Poll released prior to the game
