= 1997 Nicholls State Colonels football team =

American college football season

1997 Nicholls State Colonels football
- Conference: Southland Football League
- Record: 5–6 (3–4 Southland)
- Head coach: Darren Barbier (3rd season)
- Defensive coordinator: Manny Michel (3rd season)
- Home stadium: John L. Guidry Stadium

1997 Southland Football League standings
	Conf.			Overall
Team	W		L	W		L
No. 7 McNeese State +^	6	–	1	13	–	2
No. 21 Northwestern State +^	6	–	1	8	–	4
No. 13 Stephen F. Austin	5	–	2	8	–	3
Sam Houston State	3	–	4	5	–	6
Nicholls State	3	–	4	5	–	6
Southwest Texas State	2	–	5	5	–	6
Troy State	2	–	5	5	–	6
Jacksonville State	1	–	6	1	–	10
+ – Conference co-champions; ^ – NCAA Division I-AA playoff participant; Rankings from The Sports Network poll

The 1997 Nicholls State Colonels football team represented Nicholls State University as a member of the Southland Football League during the 1997 NCAA Division I-AA football season. Led by third-year head coach Darren Barbier, the Colonels compiled an overall record of 5–6 with a mark of 3–4 in conference play, tying of fourth place in the Southland. Nicholls State played home games at John L. Guidry Stadium in Thibodaux, Louisiana.

== Schedule ==
Date	Time	Opponent	Rank	Site	Result	Attendance	Source
August 30	7:00 p.m.	at Northeast Louisiana*	No. 23	Malone Stadium; Monroe, LA	L 0–28	14,215	
September 6		Southern Illinois*		John L. Guidry Stadium; Thibodaux, LA	W 33–0	3,348	
September 20		No. 2 Troy State	No. 25	John L. Guidry Stadium; Thibodaux, LA	W 22–20		
September 27		at No. 24 Northwestern State		Harry Turpin Stadium; Natchitoches, LA (rivalry)	L 0–19	11,510	
October 4		Samford*	No. 24	John L. Guidry Stadium; Thibodaux, LA	W 17–14	6,062	
October 11		Southwest Texas State	No. 18	John L. Guidry Stadium; Thibodaux, LA (rivalry)	W 29–28		
October 18		at Sam Houston State	No. 15	Bowers Stadium; Huntsville, TX	L 17–24	10,024	
October 25	4:00 p.m.	at Jacksonville State		Paul Snow Stadium; Jacksonville, AL	W 16–14	2,352	
November 1		at No. 6 Southern*		Ace W. Mumford Stadium; Baton Rouge, LA	L 14–21	24,000	
November 15		at No. 14 Stephen F. Austin		Homer Bryce Stadium; Nacogdoches, TX	L 7–39		
November 22		No. 7 McNeese State		John L. Guidry Stadium; Thibodaux, LA	L 13–31		
*Non-conference game; Rankings from The Sports Network Poll released prior to the game; All times are in Central time
