= Gil Steinke =

American football player and coach (1919–1995)

Biographical details
- Born: May 3, 1919; Brenham, Texas, U.S.
- Died: May 10, 1995 (aged 76); Austin, Texas, U.S.

Playing career
- 1938–1941: Texas A&I
- 1945–1948: Philadelphia Eagles
- Position: Halfback

Coaching career (HC unless noted)
- 1948: Trinity (TX) (assistant)
- 1949: Oklahoma A&M (freshmen)
- 1950–1953: Texas A&M (backfield)
- 1954–1976: Texas A&I
- 1984–1985: San Antonio Gunslingers

Administrative career (AD unless noted)
- 1954–1982: Texas A&I

Head coaching record
- Overall: 181–62–4 (college); 9–15 (USFL)
- Bowls: 1–0
- Tournaments: 13–1 (NAIA / NAIA D-I playoffs)

Accomplishments and honors

Championships
- 6 NAIA / NAIA D-I (1959, 1969, 1970, 1974–1976); 10 LSC (1959–1960, 1962, 1967–1970, 1974–1976)

Awards
- 4× NAIA Coach of the Year (1970, 1974–1976); 7a× LSC Coach of the Year (1967–1970, 1974–1976)
- College Football Hall of Fame; Inducted in 1996 (profile)

Gilbert Erwin Steinke (May 3, 1919 – May 10, 1995) was an American football player and coach. He served as the head football coach of at Texas A&I University—now known as Texas A&M University–Kingsville—from 1954 to 1976 after having played at Texas A&I and then professionally in the National Football League (NFL) for the Philadelphia Eagles. Steinke led the Texas A&I Javelinas to six NAIA Football National Championships, in 1959, 1969, 1970, 1974, 1975, and 1976. He was inducted into the College Football Hall of Fame as a coach in 1996.

== Early life and playing career ==
Steinke was born May 3, 1919, in Brenham, Texas. He had his right hand severely mauled by a lawn mower, cutting three fingers down to the nubs.

After graduating from high school in the coastal town of Ganado, Texas, Steinke began his football career as a player at Texas A&I, where he won all-conference honors on offense and defense. Steinke played with the Philadelphia Eagles from 1945 to 1948 and led the NFL in punt returns with a 14.8 average in 1947. As a starting safety, he helped the Eagles win a world title in 1948.

== Coaching career ==
After coaching in the high school ranks and at Oklahoma State, Trinity and Texas A&M, Steinke returned to his alma mater to become the athletic director and head football coach at Texas A&I from 1954 to 1976. He directed the Javelinas to 39 consecutive triumphs and six NAIA football national titles, including three in a row from 1974 to 1976. By the end of his 23-year coaching career at A&I, he had achieved ten Lone Star Conference championship trophies and 186 wins against only 62 losses and four ties. Steinke was inducted into the Texas Sports Hall of Fame in 1977 and the College Football Hall of Fame in 1996.

Later he tried his hand in the professional ranks as coach and general manager of the United States Football League's San Antonio Gunslingers. By the time he arrived in 1984, he was showing unmistakable signs of mental deterioration, almost to the point of senility. He often forgot plays and play calls, and got lost in cities that he ostensibly knew well. Despite this, he managed to keep the Gunslingers competitive, rallying a team with little talent on paper to a 7-7 finish after an 0–4 start, keeping them in playoff contention until the last few weeks of the season. After retiring to focus on his general manager duties in 1985, he was forced to take over as interim head coach for the last six games of the season after his successor, Jim Bates, resigned after several missed payrolls.

=== Role in integration ===
Steinke was one of the early proponents of integrating Southern football. He was well known for walking out of restaurants and motels that would not take blacks and whites, and bringing on many black and Hispanic players regardless of social or financial status. "We integrated football in Texas," Steinke told the Houston Chronicle in 1989. "We had Sid Blanks (later a Houston Oiler) before anyone else integrated."

=== Trademarks ===
Steinke was known for coaching from the stands to get a better view of the game, using runners to deliver plays to the team.

== Death ==
Steinke died May 10, 1995, in Austin, Texas. He is buried in Masonic Cemetery, in Caldwell, Texas.

== Head coaching record ==
=== College ===
Year	Team	Overall	Conference	Standing	Bowl/playoffs
Texas A&I Javelinas (Lone Star Conference) (1954–1978)
1954	Texas A&I	6–5	2–4	5th	
1955	Texas A&I	4–6	2–4	T–4th	
1956	Texas A&I	7–3	5–1	2nd	
1957	Texas A&I	5–5–1	2–4–1	6th	
1958	Texas A&I	7–4	4–3	T–4th	
1959	Texas A&I	11–2	6–1	T–1st	W NAIA Championship
1960	Texas A&I	8–1–1	6–1	1st	W Great Southwest Bowl
1961	Texas A&I	7–2	5–2	2nd	
1962	Texas A&I	9–0–1	6–0–1	1st	
1963	Texas A&I	5–4	3–3	4th	
1964	Texas A&I	7–2–1	3–2–1	4th	
1965	Texas A&I	6–3	4–2	T–2nd	
1966	Texas A&I	5–5	3–4	7th	
1967	Texas A&I	9–0	7–0	1st	
1968	Texas A&I	10–2	6–1	1st	L NAIA Championship
1969	Texas A&I	11–1	6–1	T–1st	W NAIA Championship
1970	Texas A&I	11–1	8–1	1st	W NAIA Division I Championship
1971	Texas A&I	7–3	7–2	3rd	
1972	Texas A&I	6–5	4–4	T–4th	
1973	Texas A&I	2–8	2–7	T–8th	
1974	Texas A&I	13–0	9–0	1st	W NAIA Division I Championship
1975	Texas A&I	12–0	9–0	1st	W NAIA Division I Championship
1976	Texas A&I	13–0	7–0	1st	W NAIA Division I Championship
Texas A&I:		181–62–4	116–47–3		
Total:		181–62–4			
National championship Conference title Conference division title or championship game berth

=== Professional ===
Team	Year	Regular season					Postseason			
Team	Year	Won	Lost	Ties	Win %	Finish	Won	Lost	Win %	Result
SA	1984	7	11	0	.389	3rd in USFL Central Division	–	–	–	–
SA	1985	2	4	0	.333	6th in USFL Western Conference	–	–	–	–
Total		9	15	0	.375		–	–	–	–
