= 1997 Troy State Trojans football team =

American college football season

1997 Troy State Trojans football
- Conference: Southland Football League
- Record: 5–6 (2–5 Southland)
- Head coach: Larry Blakeney (6th season)
- Offensive coordinator: Don Jacobs (6th season)
- Defensive coordinator: Wayne Bolt (1st season)
- Base defense: 4–3
- Home stadium: Veterans Memorial Stadium

1997 Southland Football League standings
| | Conf. | | | Overall |
| Team | W | | L | W | | L |
|---|---|---|---|---|---|---|
| No. 7 McNeese State +^ | 6 | – | 1 | 13 | – | 2 |
| No. 21 Northwestern State +^ | 6 | – | 1 | 8 | – | 4 |
| No. 13 Stephen F. Austin | 5 | – | 2 | 8 | – | 3 |
| Sam Houston State | 3 | – | 4 | 5 | – | 6 |
| Nicholls State | 3 | – | 4 | 5 | – | 6 |
| Southwest Texas State | 2 | – | 5 | 5 | – | 6 |
| Troy State | 2 | – | 5 | 5 | – | 6 |
| Jacksonville State | 1 | – | 6 | 1 | – | 10 |
+ – Conference co-champions; ^ – NCAA Division I-AA playoff participant; Rankings from The Sports Network poll

The 1997 Troy State Trojans football team represented Troy State University—now known as Troy University—as a member of the Southland Football League during the 1997 NCAA Division I-AA football season. Led by seventh-year head coach Larry Blakeney, the Trojans compiled an overall record of 5–6 with a mark of 2–5 in conference play, tying for sixth place in the Southland. Troy State began the season ranked No. 2 in the No. 5 in the Sports Network poll, but fell out of the rankings by November and missed the NCAA Division I-AA Football Championship playoffs after qualifying the previous four seasons. The team played home games at Veterans Memorial Stadium in Troy, Alabama.

== Schedule ==
| Date | Opponent | Rank | Site | Result | Attendance | Source |
|---|---|---|---|---|---|---|
| August 30 | vs. Alcorn State* | No. 2 | Ernest F. Ladd Memorial Stadium; Mobile, AL | W 30–0 | | |
| September 6 | No. 21 Eastern Kentucky* | No. 2 | Veterans Memorial Stadium; Troy, AL | W 21–12 | | |
| September 13 | at Alabama State* | No. 2 | Cramton Bowl; Montgomery, AL | W 20–13 | | |
| September 20 | at No. 25 Nicholls State | No. 2 | John L. Guidry Stadium; Thibodaux, LA | L 20–22 | | |
| October 2 | at Southwest Texas State | No. 7 | Bobcat Stadium; San Marcos, TX | L 17–31 | | |
| October 11 | Sam Houston State | No. 19 | Veterans Memorial Stadium; Troy, AL | W 13–10 ^{OT} | 5,013 | |
| October 18 | No. 12 Stephen F. Austin | No. 16 | Veterans Memorial Stadium; Troy, AL | L 13–20 | | |
| October 25 | at Samford* | No. 25 | Seibert Stadium; Homewood, AL | L 14–25 | | |
| November 7 | Northwestern State | | Veterans Memorial Stadium; Troy, AL | L 13–14 | | |
| November 15 | at No. 7 McNeese State | | Cowboy Stadium; Lake Charles, LA | L 7–10 | | |
| November 20 | Jacksonville State | | Veterans Memorial Stadium; Troy, AL (rivalry) | W 49–0 | 8,900 | |
*Non-conference game; Rankings from The Sports Network Poll released prior to the game
