= 1969 Southwest Texas State Bobcats football team =

American college football season

1969 Southwest Texas State Bobcats football
- Conference: Lone Star Conference
- Record: 3–6–1 (3–4 LSC)
- Head coach: Bill Miller (5th season)
- Home stadium: Evans Field

1969 Lone Star Conference football standings
| | Conf. | | | | | Overall |
| Team | W | | L | | T | W | | L | | T |
|---|---|---|---|---|---|---|---|---|---|---|
| No. 1/11 Texas A&I +^ | 6 | – | 1 | – | 0 | 11 | – | 1 | – | 0 |
| East Texas State + | 6 | – | 1 | – | 0 | 7 | – | 3 | – | 0 |
| Stephen F. Austin | 5 | – | 2 | – | 0 | 7 | – | 3 | – | 0 |
| Southwest Texas State | 3 | – | 4 | – | 0 | 3 | – | 6 | – | 1 |
| Sul Ross | 3 | – | 3 | – | 1 | 4 | – | 5 | – | 1 |
| Sam Houston State | 2 | – | 4 | – | 1 | 3 | – | 6 | – | 1 |
| Howard Payne | 2 | – | 5 | – | 0 | 4 | – | 7 | – | 0 |
| McMurry | 1 | – | 6 | – | 0 | 2 | – | 8 | – | 0 |
| Angelo State * | 0 | – | 0 | – | 0 | 6 | – | 4 | – | 0 |
| Tarleton State * | 0 | – | 0 | – | 0 | 1 | – | 9 | – | 0 |
+ – Conference co-champions; ^ – NAIA playoff participant * – did not complete for conference title; Rankings from NAIA poll and AP small college poll

The 1969 Southwest Texas State Bobcats football team was an American football team that represented Southwest Texas State University (now known as Texas State University) during the 1969 NAIA football season as a member of the Lone Star Conference (LSC). In their fifth year under head coach Bill Miller, the team compiled an overall record of 3–6–1 with a mark of 3–4 in conference play.

== Schedule ==
| Date | Opponent | Site | Result | Attendance | Source |
|---|---|---|---|---|---|
| September 20 | at Texas Lutheran* | Matador Field; Seguin, TX | T 24–24 | 6,000 | |
| September 27 | Trinity (TX)* | Evans Field; San Marcos, TX | L 9–10 | 8,100 | |
| October 4 | Sul Ross | Evans Field; San Marcos, TX | W 30–7 | 5,000 | |
| October 11 | at Angelo State* | San Angelo Stadium; San Angelo, TX | L 29–35 | | |
| October 18 | at Howard Payne | Lion Stadium; Brownwood, TX | L 22–28 | | |
| October 25 | Sam Houston State | Evans Field; San Marcos, TX (rivalry) | W 24–21 | | |
| November 1 | McMurry | Evans Field; San Marcos, TX | W 38–20 | | |
| November 8 | at Stephen F. Austin | Memorial Stadium; Nacogdoches, TX | L 24–42 | | |
| November 15 | East Texas State | Evans Field; San Marcos, TX | L 6–26 | 4,800 | |
| November 22 | at No. 12 Texas A&I | Javelina Stadium; Kingsville, TX | L 13–28 | 14,800 | |
*Non-conference game; Rankings from AP Poll released prior to the game
