= 1997 Southwest Texas State Bobcats football team =

American college football season

1997 Southwest Texas State Bobcats football
- Conference: Southland Football League
- Record: 5–6 (2–5 Southland)
- Head coach: Bob DeBesse (1st season)
- Offensive coordinator: Scott Bruning (1st season)
- Defensive coordinator: David Bailiff (1st season)
- Home stadium: Bobcat Stadium

1997 Southland Football League standings
	Conf.			Overall
Team	W		L	W		L
No. 7 McNeese State +^	6	–	1	13	–	2
No. 21 Northwestern State +^	6	–	1	8	–	4
No. 13 Stephen F. Austin	5	–	2	8	–	3
Sam Houston State	3	–	4	5	–	6
Nicholls State	3	–	4	5	–	6
Southwest Texas State	2	–	5	5	–	6
Troy State	2	–	5	5	–	6
Jacksonville State	1	–	6	1	–	10
+ – Conference co-champions; ^ – NCAA Division I-AA playoff participant; Rankings from The Sports Network poll

The 1997 Southwest Texas State Bobcats football team was an American football team that represented Southwest Texas State University (now known as Texas State University) during the 1997 NCAA Division I-AA football season as a member of the Southland Football League. In their first year under head coach Bob DeBesse, the team compiled an overall record of 5–6 with a mark of 2–5 in conference play.

== Schedule ==
Date	Opponent	Site	Result	Attendance	Source
September 4	Sacramento State*	Bobcat Stadium; San Marcos, TX	W 24–14	14,164	
September 13	at Hofstra*	Hofstra Stadium; Hempstead, NY	L 24–28		
September 20	Montana State*	Bobcat Stadium; San Marcos, TX	W 28–26	19,198	
October 2	No. 7 Troy State	Bobcat Stadium; San Marcos, TX	W 31–17		
October 11	at No. 18 Nicholls State	John L. Guidry Stadium; Thibodaux, LA (Rivalry)	L 28–29		
October 18	at Northwestern State	Harry Turpin Stadium; Natchitoches, LA	L 3–31		
October 25	Southern Utah*	Bobcat Stadium; San Marcos, TX	W 21–7	11,413	
November 1	at No. 7 Stephen F. Austin	Homer Bryce Stadium; Nacogdoches, TX	L 28–31		
November 8	McNeese State	Bobcat Stadium; San Marcos, TX	L 21–31		
November 15	at Jacksonville State	Paul Snow Stadium; Jacksonville, AL	W 35–27	3,208	
November 22	Sam Houston State	Bobcat Stadium; San Marcos, TX (rivalry)	L 30–35		
*Non-conference game; Rankings from The Sports Network Poll released prior to the game
