= Barrick Nealy =

American gridiron football player (born 1983)

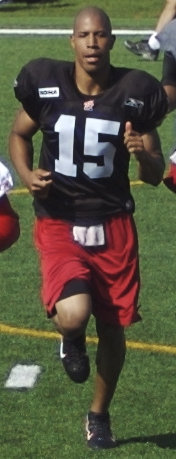
- Nealy with the Calgary Stampeders in 2007

No. 15, 17
- Position: Quarterback

Personal information
- Born: August 7, 1983 (age 43); Dallas, Texas, U.S.
- Listed height: 6 ft 5 in (1.96 m)
- Listed weight: 212 lb (96 kg)

Career information
- High school: Adamson (Dallas, Texas)
- College: Houston (2002); Texas State (2003–2005)

Career history

Playing
- 2006: Minnesota Vikings*
- 2006–2010: Calgary Stampeders
- * Offseason or practice squad member only

Coaching
- 2011–2012: San Marcos Baptist Academy (Quarterbacks coach & wide receivers coach)
- 2013–2017: San Marcos Baptist Academy (Offensive coordinator)
- 2018: UTEP (Director of player development & high school relations)
- 2019: UTEP (Recruiting coordinator & senior player personnel director)
- 2020–2021: UTEP (Running backs coach & recruiting coordinator)
- 2022–2023: UTEP (Assistant head coach & running backs coach)
- 2024–2025: Texas State (Running backs coach)

Awards and highlights
- Grey Cup champion (2008); Southland Conference Player of the Year (2005)

Barrick Dunya Nealy (born August 7, 1983) is an American former professional football quarterback who played for the Calgary Stampeders of the Canadian Football League (CFL). He was most recently the running backs coach for the Texas State Bobcats.

== College career ==
A quarterback at Texas State University, Nealy was honored as the 2005 Southland Conference Player of the Year after leading Texas State to its first-ever regular season conference championship. He held Texas State's career records for passing yards and total yards, and finished fifth in the voting for the 2005 Walter Payton Award.

For the twenty previous years, prior to Nealy coming to the institution from the University of Houston, the Bobcats had never made the I-AA playoffs. During his senior season, Nealy led his team to playoff victories over Georgia Southern and Cal Poly before falling in the I-AA semifinals to eventual I-AA runner-up the University of Northern Iowa. All three games were nationally televised by ESPN2 from Bobcat Stadium in San Marcos, Texas.

The playoff dream may have not been realized had the Bobcats fallen in their season finale to rival Sam Houston State. Despite several Nealy turnovers, the Bobcats prevailed in overtime over the Bearkats in San Marcos. The Bobcats entered the playoffs as a fourth seed.

Nealy had a standout performance against Texas A&M in a game that took place in College Station, Texas. In this game Nealy went 26 for 34, completing 76.5% of his passes for 378 yards and three touchdowns. He also rushed for 36 yards and another score. This game made many around the nation and in the state of Texas take notice of the Bobcats and more importantly, Nealy. Perhaps Nealy's most dominant game came in the NCAA playoffs against powerhouse Georgia Southern. In that game the Bobcats were trailing late in the fourth quarter and fought back to pull off a huge 50–35 victory. Nealy went 23 for 32 (71.9%) for 400 yards and four touchdowns. He rushed the ball for 126 yards and one more score.

== Professional career ==
Nealy declared himself eligible for the 2006 NFL draft, but was not selected. He signed on as a free agent wide receiver with the Minnesota Vikings in May 2006. He was released by the Vikings in July 2006 and signed a contract with the Calgary Stampeders of the Canadian Football League instead. Assigned to the practice roster, Nealy later asked to be released from his contract to attend personal business. In 2007, he returned to the Stampeders as the third quarterback on the roster.

Nealy retired from the Stampeders after two meetings with head coach John Hufnagel on June 11, 2010, saying that football was no longer fun for him. He was retained on the retired list rather than simply being released, which entitled the Stampeders to compensation in the event that he signed with another team.

== Coaching career ==
Nealy has been a high school and college football coach since 2011. He is currently the running backs coach for the Texas State Bobcats.
