= 1997 Jacksonville State Gamecocks football team =

American college football season

1997 Jacksonville State Gamecocks football
- Conference: Southland Football League
- Record: 1–10 (1–6 Southland)
- Head coach: Mike Williams (1st season)
- Offensive coordinator: Doug Meacham (1st season)
- Defensive coordinator: Charles Kelly (1st season)
- Home stadium: Paul Snow Stadium

1997 Southland Football League standings
	Conf.			Overall
Team	W		L	W		L
No. 7 McNeese State +^	6	–	1	13	–	2
No. 21 Northwestern State +^	6	–	1	8	–	4
No. 13 Stephen F. Austin	5	–	2	8	–	3
Sam Houston State	3	–	4	5	–	6
Nicholls State	3	–	4	5	–	6
Southwest Texas State	2	–	5	5	–	6
Troy State	2	–	5	5	–	6
Jacksonville State	1	–	6	1	–	10
+ – Conference co-champions; ^ – NCAA Division I-AA playoff participant; Rankings from The Sports Network poll

The 1997 Jacksonville State Gamecocks football team represented Jacksonville State University as a member of the Southland Football League during the 1997 NCAA Division I-AA football season. Led by first-year head coach Mike Williams, the Gamecocks compiled an overall record of 1–10 with a mark of 1–6 in conference play, placing last out of eight teams in the Southland. Jacksonville State played home games at Paul Snow Stadium in Jacksonville, Alabama.

== Schedule ==
Date	Time	Opponent	Site	Result	Attendance	Source
September 6	7:00 p.m.	Southwest Missouri State*	Paul Snow Stadium; Jacksonville, AL	L 42–47	14,023	
September 13	7:00 p.m.	at Sam Houston State	Bowers Stadium; Huntsville, TX	W 28–21	8,036	
September 20	6:00 p.m.	at UAB*	Legion Field; Birmingham, AL	L 16–34	23,775	
September 27	2:00 p.m.	No. 11 McNeese State	Paul Snow Stadium; Jacksonville, AL	L 6–27	3,787	
October 4	2:00 p.m.	at Middle Tennessee*	Johnny "Red" Floyd Stadium; Murfreesboro, TN	L 16–27	6,911	
October 11	2:00 p.m.	at No. 13 Stephen F. Austin	Homer Bryce Stadium; Nacogdoches, TX	L 15–41	6,217	
October 25	4:00 p.m.	Nicholls State	Paul Snow Stadium; Jacksonville, AL	L 14–16	2,352	
November 1	1:00 p.m.	at Samford*	Seibert Stadium; Homewood, AL (rivalry)	L 14–17	4,040	
November 8	6:00 p.m.	at Northwestern State	Harry Turpin Stadium; Natchitoches, LA	L 21–42	5,247	
November 15	2:00 p.m.	Southwest Texas State	Paul Snow Stadium; Jacksonville, AL	L 27–35	3,208	
November 20	6:30 p.m.	at Troy State	Veterans Memorial Stadium; Troy, AL (rivalry)	L 0–49	8,900	
*Non-conference game; Rankings from The Sports Network Poll released prior to the game; All times are in Central time
