= 1997 McNeese State Cowboys football team =

American college football season

1997 McNeese State Cowboys football

Southland co-champion

NCAA Division I-AA Championship, L 9–10 vs. Youngstown State
- Conference: Southland Conference

Ranking
- Sports Network: No. 7
- Record: 13–2 (6–1 Southland)
- Head coach: Bobby Keasler (8th season)
- Offensive coordinator: Mike Santiago (8th season)
- Defensive coordinator: Kirby Bruchhaus (8th season)
- Home stadium: Cowboy Stadium

1997 Southland Football League standings
	Conf.			Overall
Team	W		L	W		L
No. 7 McNeese State +^	6	–	1	13	–	2
No. 21 Northwestern State +^	6	–	1	8	–	4
No. 13 Stephen F. Austin	5	–	2	8	–	3
Sam Houston State	3	–	4	5	–	6
Nicholls State	3	–	4	5	–	6
Southwest Texas State	2	–	5	5	–	6
Troy State	2	–	5	5	–	6
Jacksonville State	1	–	6	1	–	10
+ – Conference co-champions; ^ – NCAA Division I-AA playoff participant; Rankings from The Sports Network poll

The 1997 McNeese State Cowboys football team was an American football team that represented McNeese State University as a member of the Southland Conference (Southland) during the 1997 NCAA Division I-AA football season. In their eighth year under head coach Bobby Keasler, the team compiled an overall record of 13–2, with a mark of 6–1 in conference play, and finished as Southland co-champions. The Cowboys advanced to the Division I-AA playoffs and lost to Youngstown State in the championship game.

== Schedule ==
Date	Opponent	Rank	Site	Result	Attendance	Source
September 6	Southeastern Oklahoma State*		Cowboy Stadium; Lake Charles, LA	W 31–0	13,000	
September 13	at Southwest Missouri State*	No. 20	Plaster Sports Complex; Springfield, MO	W 28–16	13,385	
September 20	No. 12 Northern Iowa*	No. 16	Cowboy Stadium; Lake Charles, LA	W 22–5	11,627	
September 27	at Jacksonville State	No. 11	Paul Snow Stadium; Jacksonville, AL	W 27–6	3,787	
October 4	Arkansas Tech*	No. 10	Cowboy Stadium; Lake Charles, LA	W 55–7		
October 11	Northwestern State	No. 4	Cowboy Stadium; Lake Charles, LA (rivalry)	W 50–7	15,276	
October 25	at No. 10 Stephen F. Austin	No. 2	Homer Bryce Stadium; Nacogdoches, TX	L 7–13	17,387	
November 1	Sam Houston State	No. 9	Cowboy Stadium; Lake Charles, LA	W 38–21	10,238	
November 8	at Southwest Texas State	No. 10	Bobcat Stadium; San Marcos, TX	W 31–21		
November 15	Troy State	No. 7	Cowboy Stadium; Lake Charles, LA	W 10–7		
November 22	at Nicholls State	No. 7	John L. Guidry Stadium; Thibodaux, LA	W 31–13		
November 29	No. 11 Montana*	No. 7	Cowboy Stadium; Lake Charles, LA (NCAA Division I-AA First Round)	W 19–14	13,681	
December 6	at No. 2 Western Illinois*	No. 7	Hanson Field; Macomb, IL (NCAA Division I-AA Quarterfinal)	W 14–12	5,000	
December 13	at No. 3 Delaware*	No. 7	Delaware Stadium; Newark, DE (NCAA Division I-AA Semifinal)	W 23–21	14,461	
December 20	vs. No. 4 Youngstown State*	No. 7	Finley Stadium; Chattanooga, TN (NCAA Division I-AA Championship)	L 9–10	14,771	
*Non-conference game; Rankings from The Sports Network Poll released prior to the game
