= 1970 Southwest Texas State Bobcats football team =

American college football season

1970 Southwest Texas State Bobcats football
- Conference: Lone Star Conference
- Record: 6–5 (4–5 LSC)
- Head coach: Bill Miller (6th season)
- Home stadium: Evans Field

1970 Lone Star Conference football standings
	Conf.					Overall
Team	W		L		T	W		L		T
No. 1/7 Texas A&I $^	8	–	1	–	0	11	–	1	–	0
No. NR / T–20 Sam Houston State	7	–	2	–	0	8	–	2	–	1
Sul Ross	6	–	3	–	0	7	–	3	–	0
Angelo State	6	–	3	–	0	6	–	4	–	0
Southwest Texas State	4	–	5	–	0	6	–	5	–	0
Howard Payne	4	–	5	–	0	5	–	5	–	0
East Texas State	4	–	5	–	0	5	–	6	–	0
McMurry	4	–	5	–	0	5	–	6	–	0
Tarleton State	1	–	8	–	0	1	–	8	–	0
Stephen F. Austin	1	–	8	–	0	1	–	9	–	0
$ – Conference champion; ^ – NAIA Division I playoff participant; Rankings from NAIA Division I poll and AP small college poll

The 1970 Southwest Texas State Bobcats football team was an American football team that represented Southwest Texas State University (now known as Texas State University) during the 1970 NAIA football season as a member of the Lone Star Conference (LSC). In their sixth year under head coach Bill Miller, the team compiled an overall record of 6–5 with a mark of 4–5 in conference play.

== Schedule ==
Date	Opponent	Site	Result	Source
September 12	Texas Lutheran*	Evans Field; San Marcos, TX	W 14–3	
September 19	Angelo State	Evans Field; San Marcos, TX	W 20–13	
September 26	at Trinity (TX)*	Alamo Stadium; San Antonio, TX	W 13–6	
October 3	at McMurry	Shotwell Stadium; Abilene, TX	W 40–13	
October 10	at Tarleton State	Stephenville, TX	W 41–7	
October 17	Stephen F. Austin	Evans Field; San Marcos, TX	L 17–21	
October 24	at Sam Houston State	Pritchett Field; Huntsville, TX (rivalry)	L 24–25	
October 31	at East Texas State	Memorial Stadium; Commerce, TX	L 19–22	
November 7	Howard Payne	Evans Field; San Marcos, TX	W 35–20	
November 14	at Sul Ross	Jackson Field; Alpine, TX	L 20–45	
November 21	Texas A&I	Evans Field; San Marcos, TX	L 13–42	
*Non-conference game
