= 1969 East Texas State Lions football team =

American college football season

1969 East Texas State Lions football

LSC co-champion
- Conference: Lone Star Conference
- Record: 7–3 (6–1 LSC)
- Head coach: Ernest Hawkins (6th season)
- Home stadium: Memorial Stadium

1969 Lone Star Conference football standings
	Conf.					Overall
Team	W		L		T	W		L		T
No. 1/11 Texas A&I +^	6	–	1	–	0	11	–	1	–	0
East Texas State +	6	–	1	–	0	7	–	3	–	0
Stephen F. Austin	5	–	2	–	0	7	–	3	–	0
Southwest Texas State	3	–	4	–	0	3	–	6	–	1
Sul Ross	3	–	3	–	1	4	–	5	–	1
Sam Houston State	2	–	4	–	1	3	–	6	–	1
Howard Payne	2	–	5	–	0	4	–	7	–	0
McMurry	1	–	6	–	0	2	–	8	–	0
Angelo State *	0	–	0	–	0	6	–	4	–	0
Tarleton State *	0	–	0	–	0	1	–	9	–	0
+ – Conference co-champions; ^ – NAIA playoff participant * – did not complete for conference title; Rankings from NAIA poll and AP small college poll

The 1969 East Texas State Lions football team represented East Texas State University in the 1969 NAIA football season. They were led by head coach Ernest Hawkins, who was in his sixth season at East Texas State. The Lions played their home games at Memorial Stadium and were members of the Lone Star Conference. The Lions shared the Lone Star Conference championship with Texas A&I, the eventual national champion.

== Schedule ==
Date	Time	Opponent	Site	Result	Attendance	Source
September 20	2:00 pm	Abilene Christian*	Memorial Stadium; Commerce, TX	L 23–28	8,000	
September 27	2:00 pm	at Southwestern Louisiana*	McNaspy Stadium; Lafayette, LA	W 24–13		
October 4	6:00 pm	UT Arlington*	Memorial Stadium; Commerce, TX	L 28–38	9,800	
October 11	6:00 pm	at McMurry	Abilene, TX	W 23–10		
October 18	2:00 pm	at No. 3 Texas A&I	Javelina Stadium; Kingsville, TX	L 14–28		
October 25	2:00 pm	Sul Ross	Memorial Stadium; Commerce, TX	W 42–21		
November 1	2:00 pm	at Howard Payne	Lion Stadium; Brownwood, TX	W 49–14		
November 8	2:00 pm	Sam Houston State	Memorial Stadium; Commerce, TX	W 42–28		
November 15	2:00 pm	at Southwest Texas State	Evans Field; San Marcos, TX	W 26–6		
November 22	2:00 pm	Stephen F. Austin	Memorial Stadium; Commerce, TX	W 36–35		
*Non-conference game; Rankings from AP Poll released prior to the game; All times are in Central time

== Postseason awards ==
=== All-Americans ===
- Arthur James, First Team, tailback
- Jack Herrington, offensive tackle
- Don Hynds, defensive end

=== Lone Star Conference superlatives ===
- Coach of the Year: Ernest Hawkins

=== All-Lone Star Conference ===
==== LSC First Team ====
- George Daskalakes, wide receiver
- Jack Herrington, offensive tackle
- Don Hynds, defensive end
- Arthur James, tailback
- Dub Lewis, center

==== LSC Second Team ====
- Bill Allison, fullback
- Grady Ivy, center/linebacker
- Mike Kingcaid, defensive tackle
- Dwight White, defensive tackle

==== LSC Honorable Mention ====
- Jim Dietz, quarterback
