= 1997 Northwestern State Demons football team =

American college football season

1997 Northwestern State Demons football

Southland co-champion

NCAA Division I-AA First Round, L 10–40 at Eastern Washington
- Conference: Southland Conference

Ranking
- Sports Network: No. 21
- Record: 8–4 (6–1 Southland)
- Head coach: Sam Goodwin (15th season)
- Offensive coordinator: Doug Ruse (1st as OC, 4th overall season)
- Defensive coordinator: Bradley Dale Peveto (2nd season)
- Home stadium: Harry Turpin Stadium

1997 Southland Football League standings
	Conf.			Overall
Team	W		L	W		L
No. 7 McNeese State +^	6	–	1	13	–	2
No. 21 Northwestern State +^	6	–	1	8	–	4
No. 13 Stephen F. Austin	5	–	2	8	–	3
Sam Houston State	3	–	4	5	–	6
Nicholls State	3	–	4	5	–	6
Southwest Texas State	2	–	5	5	–	6
Troy State	2	–	5	5	–	6
Jacksonville State	1	–	6	1	–	10
+ – Conference co-champions; ^ – NCAA Division I-AA playoff participant; Rankings from The Sports Network poll

The 1997 Northwestern State Demons football team represented Northwestern State University as a member of the Southland Conference during the 1997 NCAA Division I-AA football season. Led by 15th-year head coach Sam Goodwin, the Demons compiled an overall record of 8–4 with a mark of 6–1 in conference play, and finished as Southland co-champion. Northwestern State advanced to the NCAA Division I-AA Football Championship playoffs, and lost to Eastern Washington in the first round. The team played home games at Harry Turpin Stadium in Natchitoches, Louisiana.

== Schedule ==
Date	Time	Opponent	Rank	Site	Result	Attendance	Source
September 6		at No. 17 Southern*	No. 18	A. W. Mumford Stadium; Baton Rouge, LA	L 9–27		
September 13		Henderson State*	No. 24	Harry Turpin Stadium; Natchitoches, LA	W 42–7	11,817	
September 27		No. 15 Nicholls State	No. 24	Harry Turpin Stadium; Natchitoches, LA (rivalry)	W 19–0	11,510	
October 4	7:00 p.m.	at Northeast Louisiana*	No. 21	Malone Stadium; Monroe, LA (rivalry)	L 7–17	15,834	
October 11		at No. 4 McNeese State		Cowboy Stadium; Lake Charles, LA (rivalry)	L 7–50	15,276	
October 18		Southwest Texas State		Harry Turpin Stadium; Natchitoches, LA	W 31–3		
October 25		Arkansas Tech*		Harry Turpin Stadium; Natchitoches, LA	W 49–10		
November 1		at Troy State		Veterans Memorial Stadium; Troy, AL	W 14–13		
November 8	6:00 p.m.	Jacksonville State		Harry Turpin Stadium; Natchitoches, LA	W 42–21	5,247	
November 15		at Sam Houston State	No. 25	Bowers Stadium; Huntsville, TX	W 35–19	4,019	
November 20		No. 13 Stephen F. Austin	No. 21	Harry Turpin Stadium; Natchitoches, LA (rivalry)	W 38–24		
November 29		at No. 6 Eastern Washington*	No. 21	Joe Albi Stadium; Spokane, WA (NCAA Division I-AA First Round)	L 10–40	6,384	
*Non-conference game; Rankings from The Sports Network Poll released prior to the game; All times are in Central time
