= 1970 East Texas State Lions football team =

American college football season

1970 East Texas State Lions football
- Conference: Lone Star Conference
- Record: 5–6 (4–5 LSC)
- Head coach: Ernest Hawkins (7th season)
- Home stadium: Memorial Stadium

1970 Lone Star Conference football standings
	Conf.					Overall
Team	W		L		T	W		L		T
No. 1/7 Texas A&I $^	8	–	1	–	0	11	–	1	–	0
No. NR / T–20 Sam Houston State	7	–	2	–	0	8	–	2	–	1
Sul Ross	6	–	3	–	0	7	–	3	–	0
Angelo State	6	–	3	–	0	6	–	4	–	0
Southwest Texas State	4	–	5	–	0	6	–	5	–	0
Howard Payne	4	–	5	–	0	5	–	5	–	0
East Texas State	4	–	5	–	0	5	–	6	–	0
McMurry	4	–	5	–	0	5	–	6	–	0
Tarleton State	1	–	8	–	0	1	–	8	–	0
Stephen F. Austin	1	–	8	–	0	1	–	9	–	0
$ – Conference champion; ^ – NAIA Division I playoff participant; Rankings from NAIA Division I poll and AP small college poll

The 1970 East Texas State Lions football team represented East Texas State University in the 1970 NAIA football season. They were led by head coach Ernest Hawkins, who was in his seventh season at East Texas State. The Lions played their home games at Memorial Stadium and were members of the Lone Star Conference. The Lions finished 5–6 overall and 4–5 in conference play.

== Schedule ==
Date	Opponent	Site	Result	Attendance	Source
September 12	McNeese State*	Memorial Stadium; Commerce, TX	W 57–26	6,500	
September 19	at Abilene Christian*	Shotwell Stadium; Abilene, TX	L 21–41	8,500	
September 26	at Sam Houston State	Stone Stadium; Huntsville, TX	L 0–23		
October 3	Howard Payne	Memorial Stadium; Commerce, TX	L 21–28		
October 10	No. 6 Texas A&I	Memorial Stadium; Commerce, TX	L 28–43		
October 17	at McMurry	Wilford Moore Stadium; Abilene, TX	L 3–10		
October 24	at Stephen F. Austin	Memorial Stadium; Nacogdoches, TX	W 34–25		
October 31	Southwest Texas State	Memorial Stadium; Commerce, TX	W 22–19		
November 7	at Sul Ross	Jackson Field; Alpine, TX	W 29–24		
November 14	Angelo State	Memorial Stadium; Commerce, TX	L 35–8		
November 21	at Tarleton State	Tarleton Memorial Stadium; Stephenville, TX	W 41–0		
*Non-conference game; Rankings from AP Poll released prior to the game

== Postseason awards ==
=== All-Americans ===
- Dub Lewis, First Team, Offensive Line
- Dwight White, Honorable Mention, Defensive Line

=== LSC First Team ===
- Dub Lewis, Offensive Line
- Dwight White, Defensive Line

=== LSC Second Team ===
- George Daskalakes, Receiver
- Morris Minatee, Offensive Line

=== LSC Honorable Mention ===
- Bill Allison, Fullback
- Lowry Briley, Defensive Back
- Jim Dietz, Quarterback
- Terry Smith, Tight End
- Doug Walker, Linebacker
- Curtis Wester, Offensive Line
