= Bill Miller (American football coach, born 1931) =

American football coach and administrator (1931–2006)

Biographical details
- Born: 1931; Goldthwaite, Texas, U.S.
- Died: February 20, 2006 (aged 74)

Playing career
- 1955–1956: Southwest Texas State
- Positions: Fullback, halfback

Coaching career (HC unless noted)
- 1961–1964: Southwest Texas State (assistant)
- 1965–1978: Southwest Texas State

Administrative career (AD unless noted)
- 1972–1992: Southwest Texas State

Head coaching record
- Overall: 86–51–3

Accomplishments and honors

Championships
- 1 LSC (1971)

Bill Miller (1931 – February 20, 2006) was an American football coach and college athletics administrator. He served as the head football coach at Southwest Texas State University now—Texas State University—from 1965 to 1978, compiling a record of 86–51–3. Miller was also the athletic director at Southwest Texas State from 1972 to 1992.

== Biography ==
Miller was born in Goldthwaite, Texas in 1931 and graduated from Goldthwaite High School there in 1949. He served in the United States Navy during the Korean War before enrolling Southwest Texas State University now—Texas State University. Miller played for the Southwest Texas State Bobcats as a fullback and halfback in 1955 and 1956.

Miller coached high school football at Alice High School in Alice, Texas and Roy Miller High School in Corpus Christi, Texas before returning to Southwest Texas State as an assistant coach in 1961. He succeeded Milton Jowers as head football coach in 1965. Miller was head football coach for 14 seasons, the second longest tenure in program history and has the most wins with 86. Miller retired as athletics director at Texas State in 1992.

== Head coaching record ==
Year	Team	Overall	Conference	Standing	Bowl/playoffs
Southwest Texas State Bobcats (Lone Star Conference) (1965–1978)
1965	Southwest Texas State	8–2	4–2	T–2nd	
1966	Southwest Texas State	7–2–1	4–2–1	T–2nd	
1967	Southwest Texas State	9–1	6–1	2nd	
1968	Southwest Texas State	5–5	3–4	5th	
1969	Southwest Texas State	3–6–1	3–4	4th	
1970	Southwest Texas State	6–5	4–5	T–5th	
1971	Southwest Texas State	8–1–1	7–1–1	T–1st	
1972	Southwest Texas State	7–3	6–2	T–2nd	
1973	Southwest Texas State	4–6	3–6	T–6th	
1974	Southwest Texas State	6–4	6–3	T–3rd	
1975	Southwest Texas State	7–3	7–2	3rd	
1976	Southwest Texas State	5–5	4–3	T–3rd	
1977	Southwest Texas State	5–4	5–2	T–3rd	
1978	Southwest Texas State	6–4	3–4	T–5th	
Southwest Texas State:		86–51–3	65–41–2		
Total:		86–51–3			
National championship Conference title Conference division title or championship game berth
