= Tom Page (American football) =

American football coach

Biographical details
- Born: February 4, 1931; Atmore, Alabama, U.S.
- Died: May 11, 2022 (aged 91); Boerne, Texas, U.S.
- Education: Auburn University

Coaching career (HC unless noted)
- 1968–1971: Sam Houston State

Head coaching record
- Overall: 20–19–3

Thomas Mansfield Page (February 4, 1931 – May 11, 2022) was an American former football coach. He served as head coach at Sam Houston State University in Huntsville, Texas from 1968 to 1971, compiling a record of 20–19–3. After he served as an assistant coach for the Bearkats for over a decade, Page was promoted to head coach in December 1967 after Paul Pierce resigned to take a full-time faculty position. He resigned from Sam Houston after their 1971 season to go into private industry.

== Head coaching record ==
Year	Team	Overall	Conference	Standing	Bowl/playoffs
Sam Houston State Bearkats (Lone Star Conference) (1968–1971)
1968	Sam Houston State	5–4–1	3–3–1	4th	
1969	Sam Houston State	3–6–1	2–4–1	T–5th	
1970	Sam Houston State	8–2–1	7–2	2nd	
1971	Sam Houston State	4–7	3–6	T–6th	
Sam Houston State:		20–19–3	15–15–2		
Total:		20–19–3			
