= 1970 Texas A&I Javelinas football team =

American college football season

1970 Texas A&I Javelinas football

NAIA Division I national champion LSC champion

Champion Bowl, W 38–7 vs. Wofford
- Conference: Lone Star Conference
- Record: 11–1 (8–1 LSC)
- Head coach: Gil Steinke (17th season)
- Defensive coordinator: Fred Jonas (2nd season)
- Captains: Jim Brown; Karl Douglas
- Home stadium: Javelina Stadium

1970 Lone Star Conference football standings
	Conf.					Overall
Team	W		L		T	W		L		T
No. 1/7 Texas A&I $^	8	–	1	–	0	11	–	1	–	0
No. NR / T–20 Sam Houston State	7	–	2	–	0	8	–	2	–	1
Sul Ross	6	–	3	–	0	7	–	3	–	0
Angelo State	6	–	3	–	0	6	–	4	–	0
Southwest Texas State	4	–	5	–	0	6	–	5	–	0
Howard Payne	4	–	5	–	0	5	–	5	–	0
East Texas State	4	–	5	–	0	5	–	6	–	0
McMurry	4	–	5	–	0	5	–	6	–	0
Tarleton State	1	–	8	–	0	1	–	8	–	0
Stephen F. Austin	1	–	8	–	0	1	–	9	–	0
$ – Conference champion; ^ – NAIA Division I playoff participant; Rankings from NAIA Division I poll and AP small college poll

The 1970 Texas A&I Javelinas football team was an American football team that represented the Texas College of Arts and Industries (now known as Texas A&M University–Kingsville) as a member of the Lone Star Conference during the 1970 NAIA Division I football season. In its 17th year under head coach Gil Steinke, the team compiled an 11–1 record (8–1 against conference opponents), won the Lone Star Conference championship, and defeated Wofford in the Champion Bowl to win the NAIA national championship. The team's only setback was a loss to Angelo State.

The team played its home games at Javelina Stadium in Kingsville, Texas.

== Schedule ==
Date	Opponent	Rank	Site	Result	Attendance	Source
September 19	Trinity (TX)*		Javelina Stadium; Kingsville, TX	W 23–0	14,700–14,900	
September 26	McMurry	No. 6	Javelina Stadium; Kingsville, TX	W 23–10		
October 3	at Stephen F. Austin	No. 7	Nacogdoches, TX	W 14–13		
October 10	at East Texas State	No. 6	Memorial Stadium; Commerce, TX	W 43–28		
October 17	Sul Ross	No. 4	Javelina Stadium; Kingsville, TX	W 27–0		
October 24	at Angelo State	No. 4	San Angelo, TX	L 21–38		
October 31	Tarleton State	No. 11	Javelina Stadium; Kingsville, TX	W 37–20		
November 7	Sam Houston State	No. 12	Javelina Stadium; Kingsville, TX	W 31–14		
November 14	at Howard Payne	No. 7	Brownwood, TX	W 12–2		
November 21	at Southwest Texas State	No. 7	San Marcos, TX	W 42–2	> 11,000	
November 28	Platteville State	No. 7	Javelina Stadium; Kingsville, TX (NAIA Division I semifinal)	W 16–0	8,500	
December 12	at No. 6 Wofford	No. 7	Sirrine Stadium; Greenville, SC (Champion Bowl)	W 38–7	12,625	
*Non-conference game; Rankings from AP Poll released prior to the game
