= 1969 Texas A&I Javelinas football team =

American college football season

1969 Texas A&I Javelinas football

NAIA national champion LSC co-champion

Champion Bowl, W 32–7 vs. Concordia–Moorhead
- Conference: Lone Star Conference
- Record: 11–1 (6–1 LSC)
- Head coach: Gil Steinke (16th season)
- Defensive coordinator: Fred Jonas (1st season)
- Captains: Leroy Deanda; James Respondek; Gene Walkoviak
- Home stadium: Javelina Stadium

1969 Lone Star Conference football standings
	Conf.					Overall
Team	W		L		T	W		L		T
No. 1/11 Texas A&I +^	6	–	1	–	0	11	–	1	–	0
East Texas State +	6	–	1	–	0	7	–	3	–	0
Stephen F. Austin	5	–	2	–	0	7	–	3	–	0
Southwest Texas State	3	–	4	–	0	3	–	6	–	1
Sul Ross	3	–	3	–	1	4	–	5	–	1
Sam Houston State	2	–	4	–	1	3	–	6	–	1
Howard Payne	2	–	5	–	0	4	–	7	–	0
McMurry	1	–	6	–	0	2	–	8	–	0
Angelo State *	0	–	0	–	0	6	–	4	–	0
Tarleton State *	0	–	0	–	0	1	–	9	–	0
+ – Conference co-champions; ^ – NAIA playoff participant * – did not complete for conference title; Rankings from NAIA poll and AP small college poll

The 1969 Texas A&I Javelinas football team was an American football team that represented the Texas College of Arts and Industries (now known as Texas A&M University–Kingsville) as a member of the Lone Star Conference during the 1969 NAIA football season. In its 16th year under head coach Gil Steinke, the team compiled an 11–1 record (6–1 against conference opponents), tied for the Lone Star Conference championship, and defeated Concordia–Moorhead in the Champion Bowl to win the NAIA national championship. The team's only setback was a loss to Sul Ross.

Fourteen Texas A&I players were selected by the conference coaches as first- or second-team players on the 1969 All-Lone Star Conference football team. The first-team honorees were: defensive halfbacks Alvin Matthews (a unanimous first-team pick) and Ed Scott (All-LSC for third consecutive year); offensive end James Respondek; offensive tackle Andy Browder; offensive guard Ronald Fielding (All-LSC for second consecutive year); defensive end Don Hynds; defensive tackle Curtiss Neal; middle guard Margarito Guerrero; and linebacker Robert Young. Second-team honors went to quarterback Karl Douglas, running back Henry Glenn, end Eldridge Small, flanker Dwight Harrison, and center Tom Domel.

Alvin Matthews and Margarito Guerrero also received second-team honors on the Associated Press' Little All-America team. Robert Young received third-team honors, and Ed Scott received honorable mention.

The team played its home games at Javelina Stadium in Kingsville, Texas.

== Schedule ==
Date	Opponent	Rank	Site	Result	Attendance	Source
September 20	at Trinity (TX)*		Alamo Stadium; San Antonio, TX	W 21–6	5,073	
September 27	Long Beach State*	No. 9	Javelina Stadium; Kingsville, TX	W 21–7	14,000	
October 4	Angelo State	No. 4	Javelina Stadium; Kingsville, TX	W 19–9	14,200	
October 11	at Stephen F. Austin	No. 3	Nacogdoches, TX	W 49–25		
October 18	East Texas State	No. 3	Javelina Stadium; Kingsville, TX	W 28–14	15,500	
October 25	at McMurry	No. 3	P.E. Shotwell Stadium; Abilene, TX	W 21–7		
November 1	at Sul Ross	No. 4	Alpine, TX	L 12–13		
November 8	Howard Payne	No. T–9	Javelina Stadium; Kingsville, TX	W 27–0		
November 15	at Sam Houston State	No. 10	Huntsville, TX	W 28–21		
November 22	Southwest Texas State	No. 12	Javelina Stadium; Kingsville, TX	W 28–13	14,800	
November 29	No. 6 New Mexico Highlands	No. 11	Javelina Stadium; Kingsville, TX (NAIA semifinal)	W 28–23		
December 13	No. 17 Concordia–Moorhead	No. 11	Javelina Stadium; Kingsville, TX (Champion Bowl)	W 32–7	12,202	
*Non-conference game; Rankings from AP Poll released prior to the game
