= 2014 Texas State Bobcats football team =

American college football season

2014 Texas State Bobcats football
- Conference: Sun Belt Conference
- Record: 7–5 (5–3 Sun Belt)
- Head coach: Dennis Franchione (6th overall season)
- Co-offensive coordinators: Mike Schultz (4th season); Jeff Conway (3rd season)
- Offensive scheme: Multiple
- Defensive coordinator: John Thompson (1st season)
- Base defense: Multiple
- Home stadium: Bobcat Stadium

2014 Sun Belt Conference football standings
	Conf.			Overall
Team	W		L	W		L
Georgia Southern * $	8	–	0	9	–	3
Louisiana–Lafayette ***	5	–	1	7	–	4
Appalachian State *	6	–	2	7	–	5
Texas State	5	–	3	7	–	5
Arkansas State	5	–	3	7	–	6
South Alabama	5	–	3	6	–	7
Louisiana–Monroe	3	–	5	4	–	8
Troy	3	–	5	3	–	9
New Mexico State	1	–	7	2	–	10
Idaho **	1	–	7	1	–	10
Georgia State	0	–	8	1	–	11
$ – Conference champion; * – Appalachian State and Georgia Southern ineligible for postseason play due to FCS-to-FBS transition rules ** – Idaho ineligible for postseason play due to APR penalties *** – Louisiana–Lafayette vacated 2 wins due to NCAA violations

The 2014 Texas State Bobcats football team represented Texas State University in the 2014 NCAA Division I FBS football season. The Bobcats were led by head coach Dennis Franchione, in his sixth overall year, and played their home games at Bobcat Stadium. They were a member of the Sun Belt Conference. They finished the season 7–5, 5–3 in Sun Belt play to finish in a three way tie for fourth place. Although eligible, they were not selected to participate in a bowl game; the Bobcats were the only eligible 7–5 FBS team not to receive a bowl bid. This was the second season in a row the Bobcats were bowl eligible but were not invited to a bowl game.

The seven wins would set the program record for most wins in a season as an FBS program, a record that would stand until the 2023 team finished with eight wins. This would be the last season the Bobcats would finish with a winning record until 2023.

== Schedule ==
Date	Time	Opponent	Site	TV	Result	Attendance
August 30	6:00 pm	Arkansas–Pine Bluff*	Bobcat Stadium; San Marcos, TX	ESPN3	W 65–0	17,813
September 13	7:00 pm	Navy*	Bobcat Stadium; San Marcos, TX	ESPNews	L 21–35	32,007
September 20	3:00 pm	at Illinois*	Memorial Stadium; Champaign, IL	ESPNews	L 35–42	41,019
September 27	7:00 pm	at Tulsa*	Skelly Field at H. A. Chapman Stadium; Tulsa, OK	ESPNews	W 37–34 ^{3OT}	21,353
October 4	6:00 pm	Idaho^{†}	Bobcat Stadium; San Marcos, TX	ESPN3	W 35–30	21,345
October 14	7:00 pm	Louisiana–Lafayette	Bobcat Stadium; San Marcos, TX	ESPN2	L 10–34	18,509
October 25	6:00 pm	at Louisiana–Monroe	Malone Stadium; Monroe, LA	ESPN3	W 22–18	14,755
November 1	7:00 pm	at New Mexico State	Aggie Memorial Stadium; Las Cruces, NM	ESPN3	W 37–29	8,623
November 8	3:00 pm	Georgia Southern	Bobcat Stadium; San Marcos, TX	ESPN3	L 25–28	16,772
November 15	6:30 pm	at South Alabama	Ladd–Peebles Stadium; Mobile, AL	ESPN3	L 20–24	10,289
November 20	8:30 pm	Arkansas State	Bobcat Stadium; San Marcos, TX	ESPNU	W 45–27	12,264
November 29	1:00 pm	at Georgia State	Georgia Dome; Atlanta, GA	ESPN3	W 54–31	14,312
*Non-conference game; ^{†}Homecoming; All times are in Central time

== Game summaries ==
=== Arkansas–Pine Bluff ===
	1	2	3	4	Total
Golden Lions	0	0	0	0	0
Bobcats	14	28	9	14	65

=== Navy ===
	1	2	3	4	Total
Midshipmen	14	14	0	7	35
Bobcats	0	7	0	14	21

=== Illinois ===
	1	2	3	4	Total
Bobcats	14	7	7	7	35
Fighting Illini	6	7	12	17	42

=== Tulsa ===
	1	2	3	4	OT	2OT	3OT	Total
Bobcats	0	7	10	0	7	7	6	37
Golden Hurricane	0	0	3	14	7	7	3	34

=== Idaho ===
	1	2	3	4	Total
Vandals	3	0	13	14	30
Bobcats	7	14	0	14	35

=== Louisiana–Lafayette ===
	1	2	3	4	Total
Ragin' Cajuns	7	14	7	6	34
Bobcats	0	3	0	7	10

=== Louisiana–Monroe ===
	1	2	3	4	Total
Bobcats	0	0	7	15	22
Warhawks	3	10	5	0	18

=== New Mexico State ===
	1	2	3	4	Total
Bobcats	17	0	20	0	37
Aggies	7	7	7	8	29

=== Georgia Southern ===
	1	2	3	4	Total
Eagles	7	7	14		28
Bobcats	0	3	7	15	25

=== South Alabama ===
	1	2	3	4	Total
Bobcats	10	7	0	3	20
Jaguars	0	10	7	7	24

=== Arkansas State ===
	1	2	3	4	Total
Red Wolves	0	14	6	7	27
Bobcats	7	21	3		31

=== Georgia State ===
	1	2	3	4	Total
Bobcats	3	24	13	14	54
Panthers	3	0	7	21	31
