= 1971 Southwest Texas State Bobcats football team =

American college football season

1971 Southwest Texas State Bobcats football

LSC co-champion
- Conference: Lone Star Conference
- Record: 8–1–1 (7–1–1 LSC)
- Head coach: Bill Miller (7th season)
- Home stadium: Evans Field

1971 Lone Star Conference football standings
	Conf.					Overall
Team	W		L		T	W		L		T
No. 3 Howard Payne +	7	–	1	–	1	10	–	1	–	1
No. 4 Southwest Texas State +	7	–	1	–	1	8	–	1	–	1
No. 13 Texas A&I	7	–	2	–	0	7	–	3	–	0
Angelo State	6	–	3	–	0	7	–	3	–	0
East Texas State	5	–	4	–	0	6	–	5	–	0
Sul Ross	3	–	6	–	0	4	–	6	–	1
Sam Houston State	3	–	6	–	0	4	–	7	–	0
Tarleton State	2	–	7	–	0	3	–	7	–	0
McMurry	2	–	7	–	0	2	–	8	–	0
Stephen F. Austin	2	–	7	–	0	2	–	8	–	0
+ – Conference co-champions; Rankings from NAIA Division I poll

The 1971 Southwest Texas State Bobcats football team was an American football team that represented Southwest Texas State University (now known as Texas State University) during the 1971 NAIA football season as a member of the Lone Star Conference (LSC). In their seventh year under head coach Bill Miller, the team compiled an overall record of 8–1–1, with a mark of 7–1–1 in conference play, and finished as LSC co-champion.

== Schedule ==
Date	Opponent	Site	Result	Source
September 18	at Angelo State	San Angelo Stadium; San Angelo, TX	W 30–8	
September 25	at Texas Lutheran*	Matador Field; Seguin, TX	W 34–17	
October 2	McMurry	Evans Field; San Marcos, TX	W 42–3	
October 9	Tarleton State	Evans Field; San Marcos, TX	W 51–7	
October 16	at Stephen F. Austin	Memorial Stadium; Nacogdoches, TX	W 49–22	
October 23	Sam Houston State	Evans Field; San Marcos, TX (rivalry)	W 10–7	
October 30	East Texas State	Evans Field; San Marcos, TX	L 13–29	
November 6	at Howard Payne	Lion Stadium; Brownwood, TX	T 9–9	
November 13	Sul Ross	Evans Field; San Marcos, TX	W 37–7	
November 20	at Texas A&I	Javelina Stadium; Kingsville, TX	W 29–24	
*Non-conference game
