= Battle of the Piney Woods =

American college football rivalry

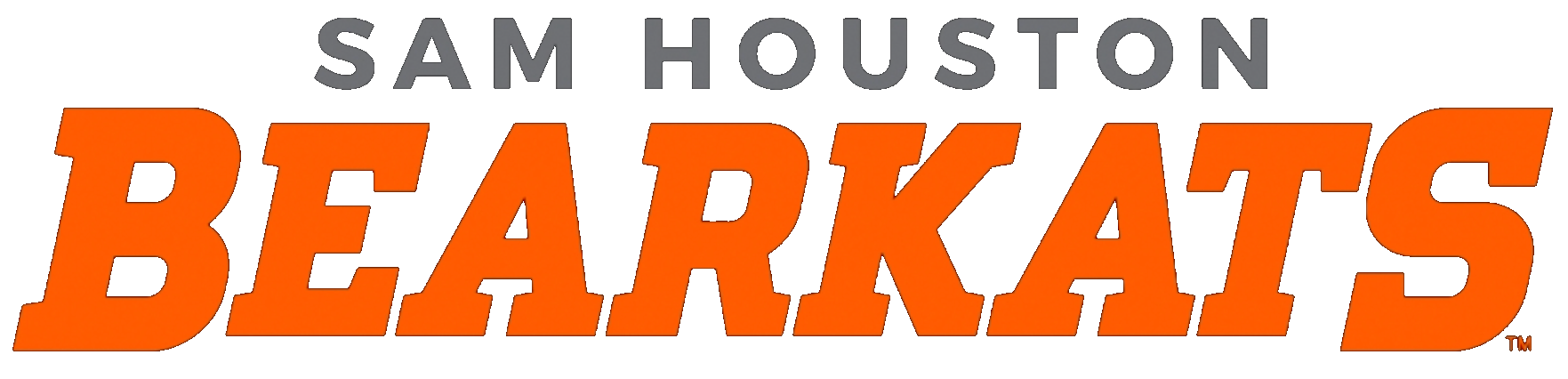
- Sam Houston Bearkats Stephen F. Austin Lumberjacks
- Sport: Football
- First meeting: November 17, 1923; Sam Houston, 19–6
- Latest meeting: October 1, 2022; Sam Houston, 17–16
- Stadiums: NRG Stadium, Houston
- Trophy: Piney Woods Trophy

Statistics
- Total meetings: 96
- All-time series: Sam Houston leads, 60–34–2
- Largest victory: Stephen F. Austin, 42–3 (2009)
- Longest win streak: Sam Houston, 11 (2011–present)
- Current win streak: Sam Houston, 11 (2011– present)

Locations of Sam Houston and Stephen F. Austin

The Battle of the Piney Woods is a college football rivalry between Sam Houston State University (SHSU) located in Huntsville, Texas and Stephen F. Austin State University (SFA) located in Nacogdoches, Texas.

== The rivalry ==
The Battle of the Piney Woods is the rivalry between the Sam Houston Bearkats and the Stephen F. Austin Lumberjacks. The rivalry is currently the second longest in the Football Championship Subdivision, with the Bearkats leading the series in football 60–34–2 as of 2024. The two schools played against each other for the last time on October 1, 2022, because the Bearkats are now members of Conference USA at the Football Bowl Subdivision level while the Lumberjacks are members of the Southland Conference. On October 20, 2009, according to SFAJacks.com and GoBearkats.com, the Universities announced the rivalry was to be moved down to Houston, in NRG Stadium until 2013. The Lumberjacks came away with a 31–28 victory in the debut game at NRG Stadium in front of a record crowd of 24,685. In 2012, the contract for NRG Stadium was extended through 2017. In March 2015, it was announced that NRG Stadium would become the permanent home of the rivalry.

The rivalry is not only in football but also in men's basketball, where the Lumberjacks lead 74–61 all-time. In the 2010 season, the conference championship featured the "Piney Woods" rivalry in the finals with the Bearkats coming out on top 64–48 to win the 2010 Southland Conference tournament and go on to play Baylor University in the 1st round of the NCAA Tournament.

== Trophy ==
Since 2007, the winner of the “Battle of the Piney Woods” has earned a 21-pound solid cedar trophy that displays replica pistols attached to a tombstone. The logos from both universities are engraved on the handle of the pistols above name plates that will display the outcomes of the contest for the next two decades.

Prior to the trophy, a pair of Colt Walker Pistols were the original prize awarded to the winning team, beginning with the 1976 contest in the Houston Astrodome. These pistols were lost over time and have not been recovered.

== Notable games ==
November 21, 1925 - Sam Houston 6, Stephen F. Austin 0 The game marked the first time the "Battle of the Piney Woods" was played in Nacogdoches. The pair battled at Birdwell Field on November 21, 1925. According to an account of the game in the Sam Houston annual The Alcade the contest was "the hardest fought game of the season, the Bearkats downed the sturdy Stephen F. Austin Lumberjacks at Nacogdoches. This fray was marked by unusual roughness and hard playing." Led by team captain Herbert Sandel, the Bearkat defense held SFA scoreless. After only three games, the rivalry had developed into a grudge match.

November 24, 1930 - Sam Houston 20, Stephen F. Austin 0 At the end of November in 1930, all that stood between head coach J. W. Jones' Sam Houston team and the Bearkats' first ever conference championship was the Stephen F. Austin Lumberjacks. Stephen F. Austin under coach Gene White had won only one game and tied another in its first six games of the season. The Lumberjacks were coming off a 64–0 loss at the hands of the West Texas A&M Buffaloes the previous week. But Coach Jones warned the Bearkats that the Lumberjacks would put up a strong effort against their arch rival and man who had coached Sam Houston in each of its battles with SFA since the first in 1923 was proven correct. The Sam Houston Alcalde reported "The men from our sister college put up a desperate fight." The article added "But their cause was lost. Driving with determination that could not be denied, the Bearkats steam-rolled the Lumberjacks and won their first conference championship." Dave James, Jackson and Coe each scored touchdowns.

November 14, 1959 - Sam Houston 6, Stephen F. Austin 0 For the first 13 seasons following World War II, Stephen F. Austin seldom had been a factor in the annual Lone Star Conference football race. But in 1959, the Lumberjacks appeared headed for a league championship, posting victories over Southwest Texas, Sul Ross, Texas A&I and Howard Payne. Only two games separated SFA from the title, the first a November 14 Homecoming encounter with Sam Houston in Nacogdoches. The Jacks were heavy favorites to defeat Sam Houston, a victory that would set up a showdown for first place with East Texas in Commerce in the pair's November 21 season finale. Sam Houston came into the tilt with only one victory in its last four contest. The Kats had been shut out by East Texas and lost to Texas A&I and Southwest Texas. Stephen F. Austin featured a potent offense led by quarterback Harold Stephens and running back Kenny Davis. A muddy field and a hard cold rain greeted the two teams as they took the field. The Lumberjacks offense ground out plenty of yardage between the 20s but bogged down each time SFA threatened to score. After a scoreless first period, Sam Houston senior quarterback Ronnie Choate led a drive to the Jack 20-yard line and put the Kats on the board with a 40-yard field goal. Choate added another field goal in the third quarter, this time from the 25-yard line. Later in the period, SFA made its most determined drive, going 82 yards to the Sam Houston 4-yard line where the Bearkats held on fourth down to regain possession.

October 31, 1964 - Sam Houston 21, Stephen F. Austin 8 In 1963 Stephen F. Austin ended a five-year Sam Houston "Battle of the Piney Woods" winning streak with a 14–13 upset at the Lumberjacks' homecoming game in Nacogdoches. Both teams returned a strong group of lettermen from successful teams for the 1964 campaign. Preseason forecasters predicted a tight race for the 1964 Lone Star Conference championship that could be decided at the "Piney Woods" tilt in Huntsville on Halloween. Coach Paul "Red" Pierce fielded a Bearkat team with a rushing attack led by halfbacks Billy Arlen, Joe Ed Lynn and Ted Minyard. Another team strength was the defense anchored by tackle Frank Fox and linebacker David Martin. The Bearkats rolled into the "Battle of the Piney Woods" with a perfect 5–0 record and an NAIA No. 3 national ranking as Sam Houston posted victories over Tarleton State, Corpus Christi, Howard Payne, Texas Lutheran and Southwest Texas. The road to the "Battle of the Piney Woods" had some bumps for the Lumberjacks of Coach Travis "Shorty" Hughes. The Jacks had lost both their non-conference games and fallen to Lone Star foe Texas A&I but bounced back with wins over Tarleton State and Sul Ross to keep their title hopes alive. SFA featured a strong running game as well with halfbacks Billy Burt and Tom Byer ranked among the league's leading rushers. It was the Sam Houston defense, however, that provided the edge for a Bearkat victory to avenge the 1963 loss. A hard tackle shook lose the ball and Sam Houston's Mike Bobo grabbed the fumble in mid-air and dashed 24 yards for the first Bearkat touchdown. Quarterback Dave Smith completed a long pass to Arlen which ended up on the 1 yard line. From there he did a quarterback sneak for the second Bearkat tally. Billy Arlen and Jo Ed Lynn gained 170 between them. Arlen, ex-Houston Austin gridder, gained 92 yards on 16 carries while Bellville's Lynn ripped off 78 yards on 19 trips. The victory was the sixth straight for Sam Houston and kept the Bearkats on the heels of Texas A&I, the nations No 1 small college leader in the Lone Star scramble. Sam Houston limited the Jacks to only 105 yards rushing and 26 yards in the air for 131 yards total offense. The Kats defeated East Texas 6–0 and Texas A&I 21–16 to clinch their third Lone Star Conference championship in eight seasons (all under Coach Pierce). Sul Ross handed Sam Houston its only loss by a 14–7 margin in season finale in Alpine but the 8–1 record earned the Bearkats one of the four berths in the NAIA playoffs. The Bearkats defeated Findlay College 31–21 in the semi-finals in Findlay, Ohio, to advance to the NAIA Championship game against Concordia College of Minnesota in Augusta, Georgia. Played in cold, wet conditions, the game ended in a 7–7 tie and Sam Houston and Concordia were named NAIA National Co-Champions. Fox and Minyard both were named as NAIA All-America first team selections. Arlen, Lynn, Martin, Norman Peterson and Keith Collins were honorable mention All-America selections. Arlen, Collins, Fox, Martin, Ed Bittick, Don Murray and Benny Sorgee were named to the 1st Team All-Lone Star Conference. Billy Arlen, Frank Fox and Keith Collins were also named to the 1st Team All-Texas squad. Pierce served three more seasons as Sam Houston head football coach. From 1952 to 1967, Pierce compiled a 92–52–7 record. During his tenure with the Bearkats, Pierce's teams won 11 of 16 "Battle of the Piney Woods" games with Stephen F. Austin.

November 21, 1970 - Sam Houston 25, Stephen F. Austin 18 In Sam Houston's first 54 years of football, the Bearkats had chalked up single season victory totals of eight or more wins only seven times. But, on the eve of the final game of 1970, the Kats stood just one win away from extending that total to eight years. The 1970 squad had rolled up Sam Houston's best record since the 1964 NAIA Co-Championship season and entered its "Battle of the Piney Woods" rival game with Stephen F. Austin with a 7–2–1 record. With a victory over SFA on that November afternoon in Nacogdoches, the Bearkats even had a shot at another Lone Star Conference title if Southwest Texas could upset nationally ranked Texas A&I. Tom Page had replaced Bearkat coaching legend Paul "Red" Pierce in 1968. In his second season as coach in 1969, the Kats had finished third in the Lone Star. A victory over the Jacks would better that mark. Sam Houston rolled into Nacogdoches with a powerful ground game built around halfback Fred Reese. Behind the blocking of an outstanding front line led by all-American Ron Carroll, Reese had rushed for more than 100 yards in five games including a 216-yard performance against McMurry. In 1970, that total ranked behind only McNeil Moore's 286 yards against Lamar in 1951. Typical of just about every meeting between Sam Houston and SFA in the series, the Lumberjacks were itching for an upset on their home field. The Lumberjack defense picked off three Sam Houston passes, helping Stephen F. Austin keep the outcome in doubt. Earnest Burr scored the first Bearkat touchdown on a three-yard run and Sam Houston quarterback David Kubiak found end Chuck Hill open for a seven-yard pass. A 15-yard touchdown run by Reese in the second half settled the issue as the Bearkats held off SFA for a 25–18 victory. The victory gave the Bearkats an 8–2–1 record for the 1970 season, the best mark for Sam Houston since 1964. Texas A&I ran over Southwest Texas 42–2 to nail down the Lone Star Conference title with an 8–1 record. Sam Houston finished one game back at 7–2 in league play. The Javelinas went on to win the NAIA National Championship. Reese finished the 1970 season with 1,115 yards on 177 carries, only the second 1,000-yard rushing season for Sam Houston to that point in Bearkat history. The halfback finished his career in 1971 with 2,160 rushing yards. That total now ranks No. 7 all-time in Sam Houston career annals but, in 1970, only Moore had totaled more career yards (2,578). Carroll, Reese and Hill along with Terry Fincher, David Kubiak, Monroe Scott and Dickey Williams earned All-Lone Star Conference honors. The win in 1970 upped Sam Houston's "Battle of the Piney Woods" record at that point to 27 victories, 16 loses and one tie.

November 9, 1985 - Sam Houston 28, Stephen F. Austin 21 Led by junior quarterback Todd Whitten, the Lumberjacks of head coach Jim Hess came into the 60th "Battle of the Piney Woods" in Nacogdoches unbeaten in Gulf Star action and nationally ranked with a 7–1 season record. Sam Houston entered the game with a 5–2 mark. But the Kats stood in a must-win situation in the Gulf Star race after falling to Northwestern State 14–10 two weeks before the SFA game. The Bearkats had an outstanding quarterback as well with senior Lanny Dycus of Abilene calling signals. The showdown brought 12,528 fans out to watch the fireworks. Head coach Ron Randleman's Sam Houston squad jumped out to a 14–0 lead with a pair of touchdowns in a four-minute span late in the opening period. Fullback J. J. Middleton completed a long drive with a one-yard touchdown at the 6:26 mark and halfback Luther Turner scored on a nifty 18-yard dash with 2:32 remaining in the quarterback. Billy Hayes added both extra points. Michael Horace put the Jacks on the board with a 14-yard touchdown run just a minute-and-a-half into the second quarter. But SFA missed the extra point and Sam Houston went into the locker room at intermission with a 14–6 lead. Two third-quarter touchdowns by Sam Houston gave the Bearkats what looked like a comfortable lead. Turner scored from the three with 7:08 in the period and Dycus hit Kenny Allen for a 13-yard touchdown two minutes later. The Kats entered the final period with a 28–6 lead. Looking for their first conference championship since tying for the 1935 Lone Star Conference title, SFA was not finished yet. Whitten hit James Noble for a 44-yard tally with 10:54 to play then added a successful two-point conversion on a pass play. With 4:54 remaining, Whitten found Andrew Ray open in the end zone for a six-yard pass to cut the margin to a touchdown. Whitten ended the contest with 324 yards in the air, but the Jacks couldn't come any closer as the Bearkats hung on for the 28–21 victory.

November 8, 1986 - Sam Houston 30, Stephen F. Austin 26 Led by senior quarterback Todd Whitten, coach Jim Hess's Jacks had lost their last two encounters with the Kats. SFA's 28–21 loss to Sam Houston not only had spoiled the Jacks' opportunity for their first undisputed league title, it had also allowed the Bearkats to share the Gulf Star championship with SFA. For additional motivation, the game marked the first Sam Houston-Stephen F. Austin meeting at the Bearkats' new 14,000-seat stadium. Then known simply as Bearkat Stadium, the facility would be renamed Elliott T. Bowers Stadium after the former university president in 1989. The Kats were 4–0 on their new home field. A capacity crowd filled the stadium to witness another "Piney Woods" showdown. SFA struck quickly with Whitten capping a 10-play, 68-yard drive with a 12-yard touchdown run just 4:43 into the contest. Three field goals by All-America kicker Billy Hayes gave Sam Houston a narrow 9–7 second quarter lead. But Whitten struck again, this time in the air with a 50-yard pass to Melvin Patterson to put the Lumberjacks up 14–9 at intermission. The see-saw battle continued in the third period. Sam Houston opened the second half with a four-minute, 11-play, 78-yard drive for Fulbright's five-yard touchdown run. A two-point conversion attempt failed, but the Kats held a 15–14 lead. Stephen F. Austin took advantage of a Bearkat turnover for a quick 10-yard drive with Michael Horace scoring on a fourth-and-one play with 5:46 remaining in the third. SFA's two-point conversion attempt failed but the Jacks still led 20–15. With 9:41 to play, the lead changed hands a fifth time as James Shorts tallied on a five-yard run to complete a 62-yard drive. Again, the two-point attempt failed as Sam Houston edged in front 21–20. Less than two minutes later, SFA was back in front after Horace broke for a 53-yard run to put the Jacks up 26–21 with 7:51 remaining. Sam Houston was forced to punt but the boot by Bart Bradley bottled the Jacks inside their own 10-yard line. A bad punt snap went out of the end zone giving the Kats two more points and the ball with 1:05 to play. Now it was time for quarterback Reggie Lewis to take over. Playing with a tender ankle and bruised ribs, Lewis engineered yet another "Kardiac Kats" finish. In just three plays and 31 seconds, Lewis took the Kats 60 yards for the scoring, finding sophomore tight end Ricky Eggleston for a 39-yard touchdown pass.

October 31, 1992 - Sam Houston 34, Stephen F. Austin 23 Emotions run high in each "Battle of the Piney Woods" and the 67th meeting of Sam Houston and Stephen F. Austin in 1992 was no exception. The Jacks struck first as Christian Fontana kicked a 38-yard field goal after a 10-play 44-yard drive with 5:11 left in the first quarter. Ashley Van Meter, who had come back from his injury that had caused him to miss the 1991 SFA game to direct the Bearkats to their second NCAA Division I playoff appearance at season's end, got a hot hand in the second quarter. Late in the fourth quarter, both teams exchanged punts with Sam Houston taking over at its own 20 with 6:24 left. Four plays later the Kats were in the end zone as Van Meter hooked up with Stewart again for a 59-yard scoring strike. Anthony Miller clinched the victory for Sam Houston with a 39-yard interception return for a touchdown with 58 seconds remaining. Sam Houston had earned a 34–23 victory.

October 23, 2010 - Stephen F. Austin 31, Sam Houston 28 Jeremy Moses became the Southland Conference's all-time leader in total offense as he led Stephen F. Austin to a 31–28 victory over Sam Houston in the 85th "Battle of the Piney Woods" rivalry played the Reliant Stadium Saturday afternoon. The crowd of 24,685 was the largest in SHSU-SFA series history and the largest crowd for a Bearkat game vs. an NCAA Division I Football Championship Subdivision. Tim Flanders led Sam Houston with 23 carries for 100 yards and a touchdown. Richard Sincere had 72 yards on eight carries and a score. On the strength of Moses' arm, the Lumberjacks powered to a 14–0 lead in the first quarter. He hit Jeremy Barnes for a six-yard score to complete an eight-play, 89-yard drive with 8:29 left in the period. On the next SFA possession Moses hit Corde Roberson for a 58-yard scoring pass. A fourth down gamble propelled Sam Houston to its first score. Bryan Randolph passed to Richard Sincere from punt formation on fourth down for a 24-yard gain to the SFA 32. Sincere then took a direct snap from center and race around left end for a 32-yard score to cut the margin to 14–7 with 12:45 in the second period. After a successful onside kick, the Bearkats took just three plays to score as Tim Flanders broke open for a 45-yard touchdown run to knot the score 14–14 at 11:19. Moses found Roberson for a 34-yard touchdown to put the Jacks back up 21–14 with 6:53 remaining before intermission. The senior quarterback continued firing in the third quarter, hitting Kris Lott for a 30-yard touchdown to complete a six-play, 69-yard drive 2:18 into the second half to put SFA up 28–14. Brandon Closner's 33-yard punt return to the SFA 19 set up a one-yard touchdown run by Tim Flanders to bring Sam Houston back to within seven, 28–21 with 2:24 to play in the third quarter. Thomas Henshaw increased SFA's lead to 31–21 with a 34-yard field goal with 13:49 remaining in the contest. Bell led an 11-play, 74-yard drive that ended with a seven-yard scoring pass to D. J. Morrow as Sam Houston cut the lead to 31–28 with 7:02 to go. The Bearkats battled to get within field goal range but was forced to punt, the Bearkat defense forced the Lumberjacks to punt and then was stopped on 4th down trying to get within range on their last drive. SFA kneeled the rest of the way for the 3-point victory.

October 1, 2016 - Sam Houston 63, Stephen F. Austin 28 Jeremiah Briscoe threw for 438 yards and a school-record seven touchdowns and the No. 2 Sam Houston State Bearkats took charge early in rolling past the Stephen F. Austin Lumberjacks, 63-28, at NRG Stadium in the 91st edition of the Battle of the Piney Woods. The game was played in front of 27,411 fans, eclipsing the game's previous record attendance set a year ago. Briscoe and the Bearkat offense, which entered the game as the national leader in yards per game, was in high gear nearly from the very start. The Kats amassed 653 yards for the day, with 438 coming through the air. The Bearkats raced out to a 42-7 lead at the half on the strength of 402 yards of total offense and four touchdowns coming from greater than 30 yards. Briscoe did most of his damage in the first half, tossing five scores in the first two quarters. Defensively the Kats did not allow the 'Jacks much room to operate, holding SFA to just 166 yards of offense in the first half, including just 67 yards on the ground with five sacks. The Kat defense allowed just three Lumberjack first downs on the first seven drives of the game, all resulting in either a punt or a turnover. Yedidiah Louis was Briscoe's main target for the day, hauling in seven passes for 119 yards for and two scores while moving into fourth all-time in receiving yards at SHSU. Meanwhile, true freshman Nathan Stewart turned in five catches of his own for 183 yards for the day and two touchdowns.

== Game results ==
Sam Houston's home games are held at Bowers Stadium, while Stephen F. Austin's home games are held at Homer Bryce Stadium. Prior to 1986, Sam Houston's home games were held at Pritchett Field, which currently plays host to the university's women soccer team. The Battle of the Piney Woods has been held at Reliant Stadium in Houston, TX since 2010 and will be held there permanently. The future of the rivalry is in doubt with Sam Houston moving to Division I FBS in 2023.

Sam Houston victories	Stephen F. Austin victories	Tie games

No.	Date	Location	Winner	Score
1	November 17, 1923	Huntsville	Sam Houston State	19–6
2	September 26, 1924	Huntsville	Stephen F. Austin	3–2
3	November 20, 1925	Nacogdoches	Sam Houston State	6–0
4	November 26, 1926	Huntsville	Sam Houston State	38–0
5	November 24, 1927	Nacogdoches	Sam Houston State	6–0
6	November 29, 1928	Huntsville	Sam Houston State	24–19
7	November 28, 1929	Nacogdoches	Stephen F. Austin	14–12
8	November 24, 1930	Huntsville	Sam Houston State	20–0
9	November 23, 1931	Nacogdoches	Sam Houston State	3–0
10	November 18, 1932	Huntsville	Sam Houston State	14–0
11	November 25, 1933	Nacogdoches	Tie	6–6
12	November 24, 1934	Huntsville	Stephen F. Austin	7–6
13	November 23, 1935	Nacogdoches	Stephen F. Austin	33–0
14	November 20, 1936	Huntsville	Stephen F. Austin	7–6
15	November 25, 1937	Nacogdoches	Sam Houston State	8–0
16	November 24, 1938	Huntsville	Sam Houston State	13–6
17	November 25, 1939	Nacogdoches	Sam Houston State	14–0
18	November 21, 1940	Huntsville	Sam Houston State	27–7
19	November 20, 1941	Nacogdoches	Sam Houston State	20–13
20	November 23, 1946	Huntsville	Sam Houston State	20–7
21	November 22, 1947	Nacogdoches	Stephen F. Austin	13–0
22	November 20, 1948	Huntsville	Stephen F. Austin	12–0
23	November 19, 1949	Nacogdoches	Stephen F. Austin	51–14
24	November 18, 1950	Huntsville	Sam Houston State	20–6
25	November 17, 1951	Nacogdoches	Stephen F. Austin	14–0
26	November 15, 1952	Huntsville	Sam Houston State	33–20
27	November 14, 1953	Nacogdoches	Sam Houston State	25–14
28	November 20, 1954	Huntsville	Sam Houston State	42–25
29	November 19, 1955	Nacogdoches	Sam Houston State	27–6
30	November 17, 1956	Huntsville	Sam Houston State	31–0
31	November 16, 1957	Nacogdoches	Stephen F. Austin	28–27
32	November 15, 1958	Huntsville	Sam Houston State	21–12
33	November 14, 1959	Nacogdoches	Sam Houston State	6–0
34	November 12, 1960	Huntsville	Sam Houston State	16–0
35	November 11, 1961	Nacogdoches	Sam Houston State	41–16
36	November 10, 1962	Huntsville	Sam Houston State	29–26
37	November 16, 1963	Nacogdoches	Stephen F. Austin	14–13
38	October 31, 1964	Nacogdoches	Sam Houston State	21–8
39	October 30, 1965	Huntsville	Stephen F. Austin	14–13
40	October 29, 1966	Nacogdoches	Stephen F. Austin	21–14
41	October 28, 1967	Huntsville	Stephen F. Austin	29–3
42	November 2, 1968	Nacogdoches	Sam Houston State	30–28
43	November 1, 1969	Nacogdoches	Stephen F. Austin	38–28
44	November 21, 1970	Nacogdoches	Sam Houston State	25–18
45	November 20, 1971	Huntsville	Stephen F. Austin	10–6
46	November 17, 1972	Nacogdoches	Sam Houston State	31–19
47	November 17, 1973	Huntsville	Stephen F. Austin	14–7
48	November 23, 1974	Nacogdoches	Stephen F. Austin	26–18
49	November 22, 1975	Huntsville	Sam Houston State	8–7

No.	Date	Location	Winner	Score
50	September 11, 1976	Huntsville	Sam Houston State	8–7
51	November 20, 1976	Houston	Tie	14–14
52	November 19, 1977	Nacogdoches	Stephen F. Austin	17–13
53	November 18, 1978	Huntsville	Sam Houston State	37–13
54	November 17, 1979	Nacogdoches	Stephen F. Austin	42–20
55	November 22, 1980	Huntsville	Stephen F. Austin	23–6
56	November 21, 1981	Nacogdoches	Sam Houston State	18–17
57	November 20, 1982	Huntsville	Stephen F. Austin	40–6
58	November 19, 1983	Nacogdoches	Stephen F. Austin	27–10
59	September 13, 1984	Huntsville	Sam Houston State	20–7
60	November 9, 1985	Nacogdoches	Sam Houston State	28–21
61	November 8, 1986	Huntsville	Sam Houston State	30–26
62	November 7, 1987	Nacogdoches	Sam Houston State	31–17
63	October 15, 1988	Huntsville	Stephen F. Austin	17–10
64	November 4, 1989	Nacogdoches	Stephen F. Austin	45–7
65	October 20, 1990	Huntsville	Sam Houston State	23–3
66	November 2, 1991	Nacogdoches	Stephen F. Austin	13–3
67	October 31, 1992	Huntsville	Sam Houston State	32–23
68	October 9, 1993	Huntsville	Stephen F. Austin	24–20
69	October 8, 1994	Nacogdoches	Stephen F. Austin	42–16
70	October 7, 1995	Huntsville	Stephen F. Austin	38–22
71	October 12, 1996	Nacogdoches	Sam Houston State	14–10
72	November 8, 1997	Huntsville	Sam Houston State	33–28
73	November 7, 1998	Nacogdoches	Stephen F. Austin	38–7
74	October 16, 1999	Huntsville	Stephen F. Austin	45–31
75	October 14, 2000	Nacogdoches	Sam Houston State	52–41
76	October 18, 2001	Huntsville	Sam Houston State	24–21
77	October 19, 2002	Nacogdoches	Sam Houston State	10–7
78	October 16, 2003	Huntsville	Stephen F. Austin	34–31
79	October 30, 2004	Nacogdoches	Sam Houston State	31–28
80	October 20, 2005	Huntsville	Sam Houston State	52–24
81	November 4, 2006	Nacogdoches	Sam Houston State	21–17
82	October 27, 2007	Huntsville	Sam Houston State	45–17
83	November 1, 2008	Huntsville	Sam Houston State	34–31
84	October 24, 2009	Nacogdoches	Stephen F. Austin	42–3
85	October 23, 2010	Houston	Stephen F. Austin	31–28
86	October 8, 2011	Houston	Sam Houston State	45–10
87	October 6, 2012	Houston	Sam Houston State	51–43
88	November 2, 2013	Houston	Sam Houston State	56–49
89	November 1, 2014	Houston	Sam Houston State	42–28
90	October 3, 2015	Houston	Sam Houston State	34–28
91	October 1, 2016	Houston	Sam Houston State	63–28
92	October 7, 2017	Houston	Sam Houston State	27–16
93	October 6, 2018	Houston	Sam Houston State	54–21
94	October 5, 2019	Houston	Sam Houston State	31–20
95	October 2, 2021	Houston	Sam Houston	21–20
96	October 1, 2022	Houston	Sam Houston	17–16
Series: Sam Houston leads 60–34–2
