= Texas State Bobcats football =

Football program at Texas State University

2026 Texas State Bobcats football team
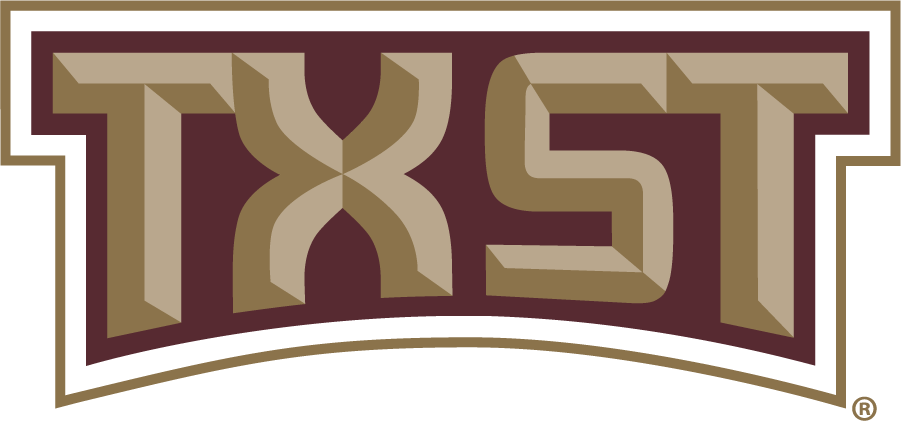
- First season: 1904; 122 years ago
- Athletic director: Don Coryell
- Head coach: G. J. Kinne; 4th season, 23–16 (.590)
- Location: San Marcos, Texas
- Stadium: UFCU Stadium (capacity: 30,000)
- NCAA division: Division I FBS
- Conference: Pac-12
- Colors: Maroon and gold
- All-time record: 548–511–25 (.517)
- Bowl record: 3–0 (1.000)

NCAA Division II championships
- 1981, 1982

Conference championships
- TIAA: 1929 LSC: 1948, 1954, 1955, 1963, 1971, 1980, 1981, 1982, 1983 Southland: 2005, 2008
- Rivalries: Sam Houston (rivalry); UTSA (rivalry); Nicholls (rivalry)
- Fight song: Go Bobcats!
- Mascot: Boko the Bobcat
- Marching band: The Pride of the Hill Country
- Outfitter: Adidas

The Texas State Bobcats football program is the intercollegiate team representing Texas State University in college football at the NCAA Division I Football Bowl Subdivision (FBS) level. As of the 2026 season, they play in the Pac-12 Conference (Pac-12). The program began in 1904 and has an overall winning record. The program has a total of 14 conference titles, nine of them being outright conference titles. Home games are played at UFCU Stadium in San Marcos, Texas.

Given that the school has grown to become the fourth-largest university in Texas (2025), and one of the 75 largest universities in the United States, it has now taken its football program to the Football Bowl Subdivision of NCAA football.

The team became a member of the FBS Western Athletic Conference in 2012. After only one season in the WAC, Texas State moved to the Sun Belt Conference. Texas State joined the league in July 2013 and began conference play for the 2013–14 academic year.

In July 2025, it was announced that the Bobcats would be joining the rebuilt Pac-12 Conference in time for the 2026 football season.

== History ==
=== Early history (1904–1964) ===
Southwest Texas State Normal School first fielded a football team in 1904. Oscar W. Strahan, for whom the current basketball arena is named, was hired as the university's first director of athletics, and served as the team's first head football coach from 1919 to 1934. He compiled an impressive 72–52–10 record and won three championships (1921, 1924, 1929). Strahan led Texas State into the T.I.A.A. in 1922 and then as a founding member of the Lone Star Conference in 1932. Joe Bailey Cheaney served as head football coach at Southwest Texas State from 1935 to 1942. The Bobcats went 23–42–6 during Cheaney's tenure. Cheaney was asked to resign following the 1942 season. The university did not field a football team from 1943 to 1945 due to World War II. Head coaches George Vest, Milton Jowers, R. W. Parker, and Jack Henry all had tenures as Texas State's head coach. Vest led the team to a conference championship in 1948, while Parker won co-championships in 1954 and 1955. Jowers, for whom Jowers Center (home of the Department of Health and Human Performance) is named, served as head coach twice (1951–1953 and 1961–1964). He compiled a 48–18–2 record, winning over 72% of his games, including a conference championship 10–0 season in 1963.

=== Bill Miller era (1965–1978) ===
Bill Miller was promoted from assistant coach to head coach in 1965. During his tenure, the Bobcats compiled a record of 86–51–3. Miller retired in 1978 as the school's winningest head coach in its history and the second longest tenured head coach.

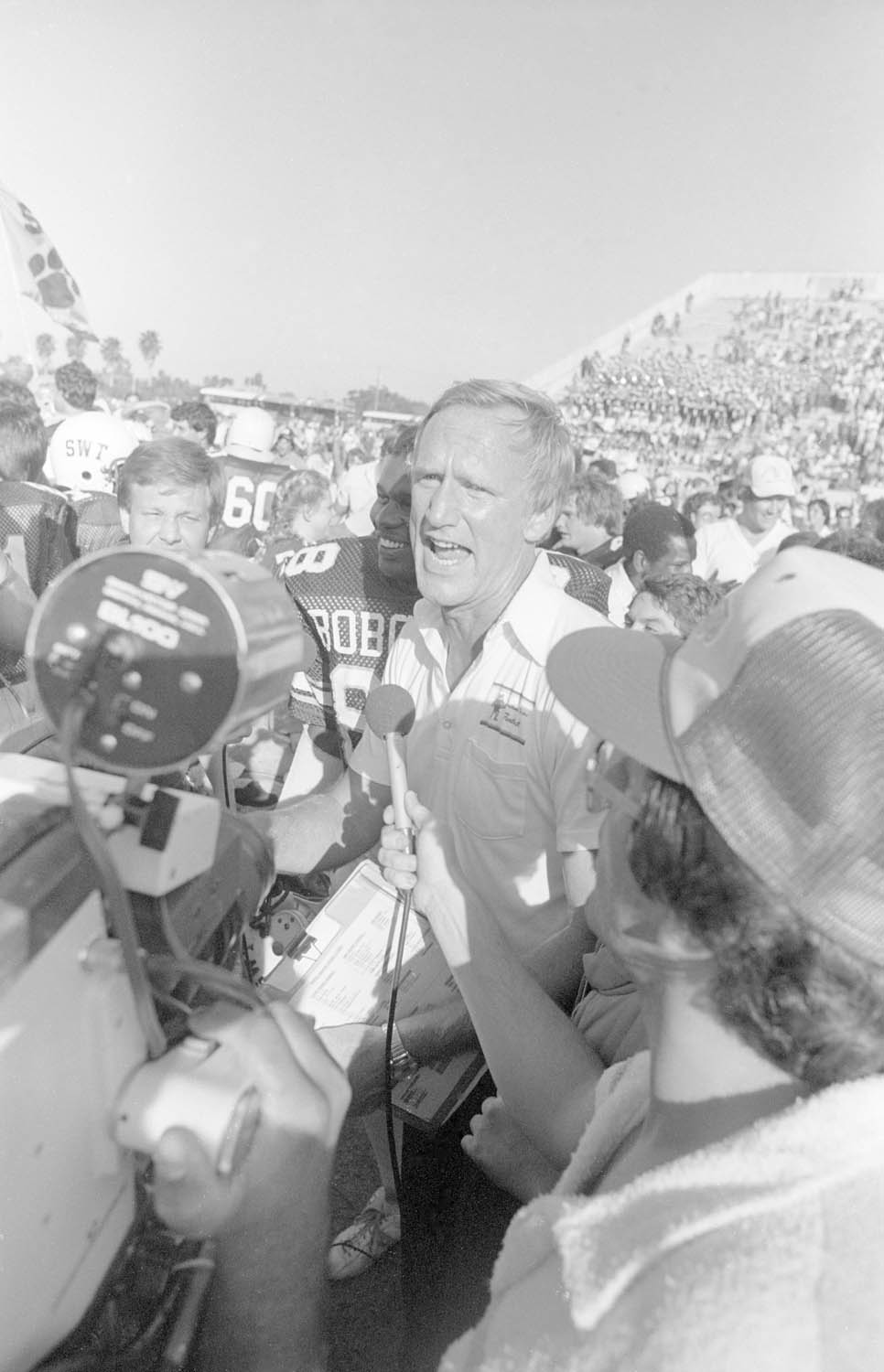
Jim Wacker, who led the Bobcats to consecutive national titles in the 80s

=== Jim Wacker era (1979–1982) ===
Miller was succeeded by Jim Wacker, who led the Bobcats to two consecutive NCAA Division II national championships in his final two seasons (The school had moved to the NCAA a short time earlier). Wacker left Southwest Texas State to accept the position of head coach at TCU after the 1982 season. Wacker left the Bobcats with a 42–8 record, which included a 13–1 mark in 1981 and a 14–0 mark in 1982.

=== John O'Hara era (1983–1989) ===
John O'Hara succeeded Wacker, coaching Southwest Texas State for seven seasons. Under O'Hara's leadership, the Bobcats shared the conference title and made the playoffs in 1983, losing in the first round. O'Hara was the driving force behind moving Southwest Texas State out of Division II and into Division I-AA, where the Bobcats faced much tougher competition on the field and on the recruiting trail. After the 1989 season, O'Hara joined the football staff at the University of Iowa, where he remained until his sudden death in 1992 at the age of 48.

=== Dennis Franchione era (1990–1991) ===
Dennis Franchione followed O'Hara, and under his tutelage, the Bobcats had a 6–5 record in 1990 and a 7–4 mark in 1991. Franchione left the Bobcats after two seasons to accept the position of head coach at New Mexico.

=== Jim Bob Helduser era (1992–1996) ===
To replace Franchione, the Bobcats promoted Jim Bob Helduser from an assistant coach to head coach. Under Helduser's leadership, the Bobcats compiled a record of 20–34–1. Helduser was approached by Franchione to join his staff at Texas Christian University as offensive line coach, an offer Helduser accepted.

=== Bob DeBesse era (1997–2002) ===
Minnesota offensive coordinator Bob DeBesse was hired by his alma mater to serve as head coach following Helduser's departure. In 2000, DeBesse's Southwest Texas Bobcats rolled up the school's best record in a decade (7–4) and earned a No. 25 national ranking. However, mediocrity forced DeBesse out after the 2002 season, as the school's administration had grown weary from mediocre recruiting and play.

=== Manny Matsakis era (2003) ===
Manny Matsakis left Texas Tech as the Special Teams Coordinator to become the head coach of the Bobcats in 2003, but he only lasted one season. In his lone season, Texas State compiled a 5–7 record. Matsakis left Texas State after the 2003 season due to management issues associated with the football program and a draft investigation report that found violations of NCAA regulations. Additional athletic department officials were sanctioned.

=== David Bailiff era (2004–2006) ===
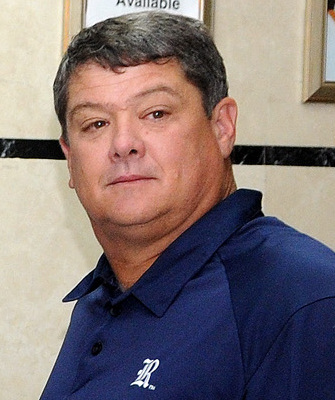
Coach Bailiff

TCU defensive coordinator David Bailiff was hired as Matsakis' replacement on February 5, 2004. In his first season as the Bobcats' head coach, he guided them to a 5–6 record. In 2005, they finished the regular season 9–2 and were Southland Conference Champions. They then won two games in the NCAA Division I-AA playoffs, eventually losing to Northern Iowa. In 2006, the Bobcats' were again 5–6. Bailiff left Texas State after three seasons to accept the head coaching position at Rice.

=== Brad Wright era (2007–2010) ===
Brad Wright was promoted from running backs coach to head coach of the Bobcats football program after Bailiff's departure. Under Wright's tutelage, the Bobcats compiled a mediocre 23–23 record. Fan support and administration restlessness led the Wright's firing following a 4–7 campaign in 2010.

=== Franchione's return (2011–2015) ===
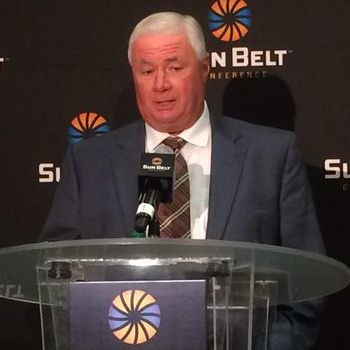
Coach Franchione

Following Brad Wright's dismissal, Texas State University engaged Parker Executive Search to help them find their next head football coach. Finalists included former Colorado head coach Dan Hawkins, Oklahoma co-defensive coordinator Bobby Jack Wright, former Minnesota head coach Tim Brewster, Houston head coach Willie Fritz, and Dennis Franchione.

On January 7, 2011, Franchione was named head coach of Texas State's football program and signed a five-year contract valued at $350,000 per year. This was Franchione's second tenure with Texas State, having previously coached at what was then Southwest Texas State in 1990 and 1991. His second tenure at Texas State was slightly less successful, as he led Texas State into Football Bowl Subdivision level football in 2012, joining the Western Athletic Conference. Texas State then negotiated membership in the more stable Sun Belt Conference beginning in 2013, after the WAC stopped sponsoring football. Franchione retired from coaching following the 2015 season. His second tenure with the Bobcats produced a 26–34 record.

=== Everett Withers era (2016–2018) ===
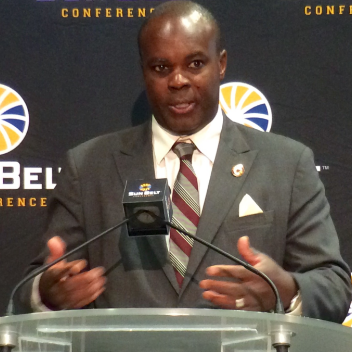
Coach Withers

Former North Carolina head coach Everett Withers was hired as Texas State's head coach on January 6, 2016. Withers, who was serving as head coach at James Madison in the FCS at the time of his hiring, is the first African American to hold the position of head football coach at Texas State University. In 2016, Withers' first season, the Bobcats compiled a 2–10 record. The Bobcats broke the all-time attendance record at their home opener on September 24, 2016, with 33,133. In 2017, Withers' second season, the Bobcats again recorded a 2–10 record. Withers entered the 2018 season with an overall record of 4–20. Withers was fired as the head coach for football on November 18, 2018, with a 7–28 record as head coach. Defensive Coordinator Chris Woods became the interim head coach for the season finale.

=== Jake Spavital era (2019–2022) ===
On November 28, 2018, Jake Spavital was hired to replace Withers as Texas State's head coach. Spavital previously served as the offensive coordinator/quarterbacks coach at West Virginia from 2017 to 2018. The Bobcats lost to twelfth-ranked Texas A&M 41–7 in the program's first game under Spavital. Under the direction of Jake Spavital, the Bobcats improved their rushing output by 65 percent, averaging 131.2 yards per game, and averaging 369.7 total yards and 27.7 points per game. These totals were the most yards gained for the Bobcats since 2015 and the most points scored since 2014. The third-youngest head coach in the NCAA Division I FBS in 2021, Spavital took the reins at Texas State on November 30, 2018, after overseeing some of the nation's most prolific offenses. He is Texas State's 20th head coach since the program began. Texas State fired Spavital following the 2022 season. In four years, Spavital's teams went 13–35 overall and did not appear in a bowl game.

=== G. J. Kinne era (2023–present) ===
On December 1, 2022, G. J. Kinne was hired to replace Spavital as Texas State's head coach. Kinne previously served as head coach of the University of the Incarnate Word, as well as the co-offensive coordinator and quarterbacks coach for University of Central Florida. In his first season, Kinne led the Bobcats to an 8–5 record and their first bowl game appearance in the program's history. Texas State defeated Rice in the SERVPRO First Responder Bowl, 45–21, on December 26, 2023.

== Conference affiliations ==
- Independent (1904–1921)
- Texas Intercollegiate Athletic Association (1922–1931)
- Lone Star Conference (1932–1983)
- Gulf Star Conference (1984–1986)
- Southland Conference (1987–2010)
- NCAA Division I FCS independent (2011)
- Western Athletic Conference (2012)
- Sun Belt Conference (2013–2025)
- Pac-12 Conference in 2026

== Championships ==
In 2005, Texas State split the Southland Conference title with rival Nicholls State, and advanced to the Division I-AA football playoffs for the first time, losing in the semifinal to eventual national runner-up Northern Iowa, and finishing with an 11–3 record.

In 2008, Texas State overcame a 21–0 deficit to win the Southland Conference championship with a 48–45 overtime victory against Sam Houston State, its first outright league title since 1982.

Texas State joined the WAC effective July 1, 2012. Then, on July 1, 2013, season, Texas State moved to the Sun Belt Conference.

=== National championships ===
Texas State has won two national championships, both occurring when they were in NCAA Division II.

Year	Coach	Selectors	Record	Bowl
1981	Jim Wacker	NCAA Division II Playoffs	13–1	Won NCAA Division II Championship Game (42–13 vs. North Dakota State)
1982	Jim Wacker	NCAA Division II Playoffs	14–0	Won NCAA Division II Championship Game (34–9 vs. UC Davis)

=== Conference championships ===
Texas State holds claim to 14 conference championships, with nine outright and five shared.

Year	Coach	Conference	Overall record	Conference record
1921	Oscar W. Strahan	Texas Normal championship	7–0	5–0
1924	Oscar W. Strahan	Texas Teachers College championship	5–3	5–1
1929	Oscar W. Strahan	Texas Intercollegiate Athletic Association	6–1–2	4–0–2
1948	George Vest	Lone Star Conference (NAIA)	8–1	4–0
1954†	R. W. Parker	Lone Star Conference (NAIA)	6–3–1	5–0–1
1955†	R. W. Parker	Lone Star Conference (NAIA)	6–1–2	5–1
1963	Milton Jowers	Lone Star Conference (NAIA)	10–0	6–0
1971†	Bill Miller	Lone Star Conference (NAIA)	8–1–1	7–1–1
1980	Jim Wacker	Lone Star Conference (Division II)	8–3	5–1
1981	Jim Wacker	Lone Star Conference (Division II)	13–1	6–1
1982	Jim Wacker	Lone Star Conference (Division II)	14–0	7–0
1983†	John O'Hara	Lone Star Conference (Division II)	9–2	6–1
2005†	David Bailiff	Southland Conference (Division I FCS)	11–3	4–1
2008	Brad Wright	Southland Conference (Division I FCS)	8–5	6–2

† Co-championship

== Postseason results ==
=== Bowl games ===
Texas State has participated in three bowl games, and has a record of 3–0.

Prior to 2023, they were bowl eligible twice since moving up to Division I-FBS. In 2013, Texas State went 6–6 in the first year the Bobcats were eligible to win a conference title or attend a bowl game after their 2-year FCS to FBS transition. In 2014, Texas State finished the season 7–5, 5–3 in Sun Belt play to finish in a three-way tie for fourth place. Although eligible, they were not selected to participate in a bowl game; the Bobcats were the only eligible 7–5 FBS team not to receive a bowl bid.

In November 2023, the Bobcats became bowl eligible after winning 45–24 against Georgia Southern. In December, it was announced that the team would play its first-ever bowl game against the Rice University Owls at Gerald J. Ford Stadium on December 26.

Season	Coach	Bowl	Opponent	Result
2023	G. J. Kinne	First Responder Bowl	Rice	W 45–21
2024	G. J. Kinne	First Responder Bowl	North Texas	W 30–28
2025	G.J. Kinne	Armed Forces Bowl	Rice	W 41–10

=== NCAA Division I-AA/FCS playoffs ===
The Bobcats have appeared in the NCAA Division I Football Championship playoff two times with an overall record of 2–2.

Year	Round	Opponent	Result
2005	First Round; Quarterfinals; Semifinals	Georgia Southern; Cal Poly; Northern Iowa	W 50–35; W 14–7; L 37–40
2008	First Round	Montana	L 13–31

=== NCAA Division II playoffs ===
The Bobcats have appeared in the NCAA Division II football championship playoffs three times with an overall record of 6–1. They were national champions in 1981 and 1982.

Year	Round	Opponent	Result
1981	Quarterfinals; Semifinals; National Championship Game	Jacksonville State; Northern Michigan; North Dakota State	W 38–22; W 62–0; W 42–13
1982	Quarterfinals; Semifinals; National Championship Game	Fort Valley State; Jacksonville State; UC Davis	W 27–6; W 19–14; W 34–9
1983	Quarterfinals	Central State	L 16–24

== All-time record vs. Pac-12 teams ==
Official record (including any NCAA imposed vacates and forfeits) against all current Pac-12 opponents:

Opponent	Won	Lost	Percentage	Streak	First	Last
Boise State	0	0	–	N/A	N/A	N/A
Colorado State	0	0	–	N/A	N/A	N/A
Fresno State	0	0	–	N/A	N/A	N/A
Oregon State	0	0	–	N/A	N/A	N/A
San Diego State	0	0	–	N/A	N/A	N/A
Utah State	0	1	.000	Lost 1	2012	2012
Washington State	0	0	–	N/A	N/A	N/A
Totals	0	1	.000			

== Rivalries ==
Texas State football maintains a rivalry with the UTSA. They also have a number of defunct rivalries caused by conference realignment.

=== Sam Houston ===
Beginning in 1915, Texas State and Sam Houston played annually until a major conference realignment caused the rivalry to go defunct in 2011. However, due to another major conference realignment, the rivalry has since been renewed for the 2024 season at NRG Stadium where the Bearkats won 40–39 in front of a crowd of 27,225. The Bobcats lead the series 50–38–5, but the Bearkats hold a lead in the series since both teams moved to the Division I ranks in 1986 at 17–9–1. As of September 2024, there is no future game scheduled in this rivalry series through at least 2031.

=== UTSA ===
Texas State and UTSA faced off for the first time in the football continuation of the I-35 Maroon/Orange Rivalry between the two schools in the Alamodome on November 24, 2012. Texas State won the last matchup 43–36 at UFCU Stadium on September 6, 2025. UTSA leads the series 5–2.

=== North Texas ===
The first ever meeting between Texas State and North Texas took place during the 1915 season with the Mean Green winning 14–0. The Bobcats and the Mean Green have played 40 times against each other, making it the second most played series between the Group of Five Texas schools behind the Sam Houston–Texas State series. When Texas State defeated North Texas in the 2025 First Responder Bowl, it was the first time the teams have met since the 1994 season. North Texas leads the overall series 29–8–2.

Texas State will face North Texas in the 2026 and 2030 football seasons.

=== Nicholls ===
As of the end of the 2025 season, Texas State Bobcats football leads the series 17–15.

== Future non-conference opponents ==
Announced schedules as of September 10, 2026

2026	2027	2028	2029	2030	2031
at Texas	at Texas A&M	at Kansas State	Lamar	at North Texas	at UTSA
UTSA	UTRGV	UTSA	at UTSA	UTSA	UTEP
North Texas	at UTSA	at UTEP	at TCU	at Texas Tech	
UIW	Ohio	Texas Southern		UTRGV	

== Bobcats in the NFL ==
First round draft picks

Name	Position	Year	Overall pick	Team
Ricky Sanders	WR	1984	16	New England Patriots

=== Active NFL ===
Updated April 2026.

Player	NFL team
Deion Hankins	Chicago Bears
Nash Jones	Denver Broncos

== See also ==
- American football in the United States
