= List of Atlantic 10 Conference football standings =

This is a list of yearly Atlantic 10 Conference football standings.

== Atlantic 10 standings ==
1997 Atlantic 10 Conference football standings
	Conf.			Overall
Team	W		L	W		L
New England Division
New Hampshire x	5	–	3	5	–	6
Connecticut	4	–	4	7	–	4
Maine	4	–	4	5	–	6
Rhode Island	2	–	6	2	–	9
Boston University	1	–	7	1	–	10
UMass	1	–	7	2	–	9
Mid-Atlantic Division
No. 1 Villanova x$^	8	–	0	12	–	1
No. 3 Delaware ^	7	–	1	12	–	2
No. 20 Northeastern	5	–	3	8	–	3
Richmond	4	–	4	6	–	5
William & Mary	4	–	4	7	–	4
James Madison	3	–	5	5	–	6
$ – Conference champion; x – Division champion/co-champions; ^ – NCAA Division I-AA playoff participant; Rankings from The Sports Network poll

1998 Atlantic 10 Conference football standings
	Conf.			Overall
Team	W		L	W		L
New England Division
No. 1 UMass x^	6	–	2	12	–	3
No. 9 Connecticut x^	6	–	2	10	–	3
Maine	3	–	5	6	–	5
New Hampshire	3	–	5	4	–	7
Rhode Island	2	–	6	3	–	8
Mid-Atlantic Division
No. 10 Richmond x$^	7	–	1	9	–	3
No. 23 Delaware	4	–	4	7	–	4
Villanova	4	–	4	6	–	5
No. 17 William & Mary	4	–	4	7	–	4
Northeastern	3	–	5	5	–	6
James Madison	2	–	6	3	–	8
$ – Conference champion; x – Division champion/co-champions; ^ – NCAA Division I-AA playoff participant; Rankings from The Sports Network poll

1999 Atlantic 10 Conference football standings
	Conf.			Overall
Team	W		L	W		L
No. 13 James Madison +^	7	–	1	8	–	4
No. 7 UMass +^	7	–	1	9	–	4
No. 24 Villanova	6	–	2	7	–	4
Delaware	5	–	3	7	–	4
William & Mary	5	–	3	6	–	5
Connecticut	3	–	5	4	–	7
Maine	3	–	5	4	–	7
New Hampshire	3	–	5	5	–	6
Richmond	3	–	5	5	–	6
Northeastern	1	–	7	2	–	9
Rhode Island	1	–	7	1	–	10
+ – Conference co-champions; ^ – NCAA Division I-AA playoff participant; Rankings from The Sports Network poll

2000 Atlantic 10 Conference football standings
	Conf.			Overall
Team	W		L	W		L
No. 3 Delaware +^	7	–	1	12	–	2
No. 6 Richmond +^	7	–	1	10	–	3
UMass	5	–	3	7	–	4
James Madison	4	–	4	6	–	5
New Hampshire	4	–	4	6	–	5
William & Mary	4	–	4	5	–	6
Maine	3	–	5	5	–	6
Villanova	3	–	5	5	–	6
Rhode Island	2	–	6	3	–	8
Northeastern	1	–	7	4	–	7
+ – Conference co-champions; ^ – NCAA Division I-AA playoff participant; Rankings from The Sports Network poll

2001 Atlantic 10 Conference football standings
	Conf.			Overall
Team	W		L	W		L
No. 11 Hofstra +^	7	–	2	9	–	3
No. 10 Maine +^	7	–	2	9	–	3
No. 20 Villanova +	7	–	2	8	–	3
No. 17 William & Mary +^	7	–	2	8	–	4
No. 21 Rhode Island	6	–	3	8	–	3
Delaware	4	–	5	4	–	6
Northeastern	4	–	5	5	–	6
UMass	3	–	6	3	–	8
Richmond	3	–	6	3	–	8
New Hampshire	2	–	7	4	–	7
James Madison	0	–	9	2	–	9
+ – Conference co-champions; ^ – NCAA Division I-AA playoff participant; Rankings from The Sports Network poll

2002 Atlantic 10 Conference football standings
	Conf.			Overall
Team	W		L	W		L
No. 6 Maine $^	7	–	2	11	–	3
No. 11 Northeastern $^	7	–	2	10	–	3
No. 4 Villanova ^	6	–	3	11	–	4
UMass	6	–	3	8	–	4
William & Mary	5	–	4	6	–	5
Richmond	4	–	5	4	–	7
Delaware	4	–	5	6	–	6
Hofstra	4	–	5	6	–	6
James Madison	4	–	6	5	–	7
New Hampshire	2	–	7	3	–	8
Rhode Island	1	–	8	3	–	9
+ – Conference co-champions; ^ – NCAA Division I-AA playoff participant; Rankings from The Sports Network poll

2003 Atlantic 10 Conference football standings
	Conf.			Overall
Team	W		L	W		L
No. 1 Delaware +^	8	–	1	15	–	1
No. 11 UMass +^	8	–	1	10	–	3
No. 20 Northeastern	6	–	3	8	–	4
No. 25 Villanova	5	–	4	7	–	4
Maine	4	–	4	6	–	5
William & Mary	4	–	4	5	–	5
James Madison	4	–	5	6	–	6
New Hampshire	3	–	6	5	–	7
Rhode Island	3	–	6	4	–	8
Hofstra	2	–	6	2	–	10
Richmond	1	–	8	2	–	9
+ – Conference co-champions; ^ – NCAA Division I-AA playoff participant; Rankings from The Sports Network poll

2004 Atlantic 10 Conference football standings
	Conf.			Overall
Team	W		L	W		L
North Division
No. 6 New Hampshire x^	6	–	2	11	–	3
UMass	4	–	4	6	–	5
Northeastern	4	–	4	5	–	6
Hofstra	3	–	5	5	–	6
Maine	3	–	5	5	–	6
Rhode Island	2	–	6	4	–	7
South Division
No. 1 James Madison x^	7	–	1	13	–	2
No. 3 William & Mary x^	7	–	1	11	–	3
No. 7 Delaware x^	7	–	1	9	–	4
Villanova	3	–	5	6	–	5
Richmond	2	–	6	3	–	8
Towson	0	–	8	3	–	8
x – Division champion/co-champions; ^ – NCAA Division I-AA playoff participant; Rankings from The Sports Network poll

2005 Atlantic 10 Conference football standings
	Conf.			Overall
Team	W		L	W		L
North Division
No. 5 New Hampshire x+^	7	–	1	11	–	2
No. 19 UMass	6	–	2	7	–	4
Hofstra	5	–	3	8	–	4
Maine	3	–	5	5	–	6
Northeastern	2	–	6	3	–	9
Rhode Island	2	–	6	4	–	7
South Division
No. 8 Richmond x+^	7	–	1	9	–	4
No. 25 James Madison	5	–	3	7	–	4
Towson	3	–	5	7	–	4
Delaware	3	–	5	6	–	5
William & Mary	3	–	5	5	–	6
Villanova	2	–	6	4	–	7
+ – Conference co-champions; x – Division champion/co-champions; ^ – NCAA Division I-AA playoff participant; Rankings from The Sports Network poll

2006 Atlantic 10 Conference football standings
	Conf.			Overall
Team	W		L	W		L
North Division
No. 2 UMass x$^	8	–	0	13	–	2
No. 6 New Hampshire ^	5	–	3	9	–	4
Maine	5	–	3	6	–	5
Northeastern	4	–	4	5	–	6
Rhode Island	2	–	6	4	–	7
Hofstra	1	–	7	2	–	9
South Division
No. 9 James Madison x^	7	–	1	9	–	3
Villanova	5	–	3	6	–	5
Towson	4	–	4	7	–	4
Richmond	3	–	5	6	–	5
Delaware	3	–	5	5	–	6
William & Mary	1	–	7	3	–	8
$ – Conference champion; x – Division champion/co-champions; ^ – FCS playoff participant; Rankings from The Sports Network poll
