= 1997 Wofford Terriers football team =

American college football season

1997 Wofford Terriers football
- Conference: Southern Conference
- Record: 3–7 (2–6 SoCon)
- Head coach: Mike Ayers (10th season)
- Home stadium: Gibbs Stadium

1997 Southern Conference football standings
	Conf.			Overall
Team	W		L	W		L
No. 8 Georgia Southern $^	7	–	1	10	–	3
No. 15 Appalachian State	6	–	2	7	–	4
East Tennessee State	5	–	3	7	–	4
Furman	5	–	3	7	–	4
The Citadel	4	–	4	6	–	5
Chattanooga	4	–	4	7	–	4
Western Carolina	3	–	5	3	–	8
Wofford	2	–	6	3	–	7
VMI	0	–	8	0	–	11
$ – Conference champion; ^ – NCAA Division I-AA playoff participant; Rankings from The Sports Network I-AA Poll

The 1997 Wofford Terriers football team was an American football team that represented Wofford College as a member of the Southern Conference (SoCon) during the 1997 NCAA Division I-AA football season. Led by 10th-year head coach Mike Ayers, the Terriers compiled and overall record of 3–7, with a mark of 2–6 in conference play, and finished eighth in the SoCon.

== Schedule ==
Date	Opponent	Site	Result	Attendance	Source
September 6	VMI	Gibbs Stadium; Spartanburg, SC	W 23–13	7,432	
September 20	No. 20 Georgia Southern	Gibbs Stadium; Spartanburg, SC	L 7–22	7,236	
October 4	at Chattanooga	Chamberlain Field; Chattanooga, TN	L 17–20	9,102	
October 11	at Morehead State*	Jayne Stadium; Morehead, KY	L 35–37	7,100	
October 18	at Western Carolina	E. J. Whitmire Stadium; Cullowhee, NC	W 17–7		
October 25	No. 22 Appalachian State	Gibbs Stadium; Spartanburg, SC	L 21–26	8,155	
November 1	at The Citadel	Johnson Hagood Stadium; Charleston, SC (rivalry)	L 3–7	10,857	
November 8	No. 20 East Tennessee State	Gibbs Stadium; Spartanburg, SC	L 28–31		
November 15	at Furman	Paladin Stadium; Greenville, SC (rivalry)	L 7–28	9,560	
November 22	Charleston Southern*	Gibbs Stadium; Spartanburg, SC	W 51–21	6,846	
*Non-conference game; Rankings from The Sports Network Poll released prior to the game
