= 1997 Tennessee State Tigers football team =

American college football season

1997 Tennessee State Tigers football
- Conference: Ohio Valley Conference
- Record: 4–7 (4–3 OVC)
- Head coach: L. C. Cole (2nd season)
- Offensive coordinator: Johnnie Cole (2nd season)
- Defensive coordinator: Jake Cabell (2nd season)
- Home stadium: Hale Stadium

1997 Ohio Valley Conference football standings
	Conf.			Overall
Team	W		L	W		L
No. 19 Eastern Kentucky $^	7	–	0	8	–	4
No. 16 Eastern Illinois	5	–	2	8	–	3
Murray State	5	–	2	7	–	4
Tennessee Tech	4	–	3	6	–	5
Tennessee State	4	–	3	4	–	7
Middle Tennessee	2	–	5	4	–	6
Southeast Missouri State	1	–	6	4	–	7
Tennessee–Martin	0	–	7	1	–	10
$ – Conference champion; ^ – NCAA Division I-AA playoff participant; Rankings from The Sports Network poll

The 1997 Tennessee State Tigers football team represented Tennessee State University as a member of the Ohio Valley Conference (OVC) during the 1997 NCAA Division I-AA football season. Led by second-year head coach L. C. Cole, the Tigers compiled an overall record of 4–7, with a conference record of 4–3, and finished tied for fourth in the OVC.

== Schedule ==
Date	Opponent	Site	Result	Attendance	Source
August 30	at No. 18 Florida A&M*	Bragg Memorial Stadium; Tallahassee, FL	L 28–43	18,631	
September 6	Middle Tennessee	Hale Stadium; Nashville, TN	W 25–16	14,983	
September 13	vs. No. 12 Jackson State*	Liberty Bowl Memorial Stadium; Memphis, TN (Southern Heritage Classic)	L 28–31	61,171	
September 27	vs. South Carolina State*	Georgia Dome; Atlanta, GA (Atlanta Football Classic)	L 28–34	41,292	
October 4	vs. North Carolina A&T*	RCA Dome; Indianapolis, IN (Circle City Classic)	L 37–49	59,011	
October 11	Eastern Kentucky	Hale Stadium; Nashville, TN	L 7–49	6,124	
October 18	at Chattanooga*	Finley Stadium; Chattanooga, TN	L 7–28	22,646	
October 25	at Tennessee–Martin	Pacer Stadium; Martin, TN	W 27–20	5,021	
November 8	Tennessee Tech^{†}	Hale Stadium; Nashville, TN	W 28–21	17,255	
November 15	Murray State	Hale Stadium; Nashville, TN	L 7–13	1,728	
November 22	at Southeast Missouri State	Houck Stadium; Cape Girardeau, MO	W 32–27		
*Non-conference game; ^{†}Homecoming; Rankings from The Sports Network Poll released prior to the game
