= 1997 Grambling State Tigers football team =

American college football season

1997 Grambling State Tigers football
- Conference: Southwestern Athletic Conference
- Record: 3–8 (2–5 SWAC)
- Head coach: Eddie Robinson (55th season)
- Home stadium: Eddie G. Robinson Memorial Stadium

1997 Southwestern Athletic Conference football standings
	Conf.			Overall
Team	W		L	W		L
No. 12 Southern $	8	–	0	11	–	1
No. 14 Jackson State ^	7	–	1	9	–	3
Arkansas–Pine Bluff	6	–	2	8	–	3
Texas Southern	4	–	4	5	–	6
Alcorn State	4	–	4	4	–	7
Mississippi Valley State	3	–	5	4	–	6
Alabama State	2	–	6	3	–	8
Grambling State	2	–	6	3	–	8
Prairie View A&M	0	–	8	0	–	9
$ – Conference champion; ^ – NCAA Division I-AA playoff participant; Rankings from The Sports Network Poll

The 1997 Grambling State Tigers football team represented Grambling State University as a member of the Southwestern Athletic Conference (SWAC) during the 1997 NCAA Division I-AA football season. The Tigers were led by head coach Eddie Robinson in his 55th year and finished the season with a record of three wins and eight losses (3–8, 2–5 SWAC). The Tigers offense scored 187 points while the defense allowed 258 points.

This was Eddie Robinson's final season as head coach. Robinson spent fifty-six years as the head coach at historically black Grambling State University in Grambling in Lincoln Parish in northern Louisiana, from 1941 through 1997.

== Schedule ==
Date	Opponent	Site	Result	Attendance	Source
September 6	at Alcorn State	Jack Spinks Stadium; Lorman, MS	L 20–44		
September 20	at Langston*	Taft Stadium; Oklahoma City, OK	W 20–0	20,000	
September 27	vs. Hampton*	Giants Stadium; East Rutherford, NJ (Urban League Classic)	L 7–42	49,156	
October 4	vs. Prairie View A&M	Cotton Bowl; Dallas, TX (rivalry)	W 33–6	55,119	
October 11	Mississippi Valley State	Eddie G. Robinson Memorial Stadium; Grambling, LA	W 20–13		
October 18	vs. Arkansas–Pine Bluff	Independence Stadium; Shreveport, LA (Red River Classic)	L 16–22	13,004	
October 25	at No. 20 Jackson State	Mississippi Veterans Memorial Stadium; Jackson, MS	L 0–23	35,430	
November 1	Texas Southern^{†}	Eddie G. Robinson Memorial Stadium; Grambling, LA	L 16–21		
November 9	at Alabama State	Cramton Bowl; Montgomery, AL (Note: This game was originally scheduled to be played at the Rose Bowl in Pasadena, California, but moved to Montgomery due to low ticket sales and a lack of up-front money from the promoters.)	L 13–20		
November 15	North Carolina A&T*	Eddie G. Robinson Memorial Stadium; Grambling, LA	L 35–37		
November 29	vs. Southern	Louisiana Superdome; New Orleans, LA (Bayou Classic)	L 7–30		
*Non-conference game; ^{†}Homecoming; Rankings from The Sports Network Poll released prior to the game

== Team players in the NFL ==
- None of the players from the Tigers were drafted in the 1998 NFL draft.
