= 1997 The Citadel Bulldogs football team =

American college football season

1997 The Citadel Bulldogs football
- Conference: Southern Conference
- Record: 6–5 (4–4 SoCon)
- Head coach: Don Powers (2nd season)
- Offensive scheme: Option
- Home stadium: Johnson Hagood Stadium

1997 Southern Conference football standings
	Conf.			Overall
Team	W		L	W		L
No. 8 Georgia Southern $^	7	–	1	10	–	3
No. 15 Appalachian State	6	–	2	7	–	4
East Tennessee State	5	–	3	7	–	4
Furman	5	–	3	7	–	4
The Citadel	4	–	4	6	–	5
Chattanooga	4	–	4	7	–	4
Western Carolina	3	–	5	3	–	8
Wofford	2	–	6	3	–	7
VMI	0	–	8	0	–	11
$ – Conference champion; ^ – NCAA Division I-AA playoff participant; Rankings from The Sports Network I-AA Poll

The 1997 The Citadel Bulldogs football team represented The Citadel, The Military College of South Carolina in the 1997 NCAA Division I-AA football season. Don Powers served as head coach for the second season. The Bulldogs played as members of the Southern Conference and played home games at Johnson Hagood Stadium.

== Schedule ==
Date	Opponent	Site	Result	Attendance	Source
September 6	Newberry*	Johnson Hagood Stadium; Charleston, SC	W 33–13	14,733	
September 13	South Florida*	Johnson Hagood Stadium; Charleston, SC	W 10–7	12,154	
September 20	at Western Carolina	E. J. Whitmire Stadium; Cullowhee, NC	L 25–45	9,720	
September 27	No. 6 Appalachian State	Johnson Hagood Stadium; Charleston, SC	L 15–40	6,093	
October 4	at No. 23 (I-A) Air Force*	Falcon Stadium; Colorado Springs, CO	L 3–17	42,536	
October 11	at No. 8 East Tennessee State	Memorial Center; Johnson City, TN	W 23–20 ^{OT}	7,039	
October 18	No. 22 Furman	Johnson Hagood Stadium; Charleston, SC (rivalry)	L 7–21	11,245	
October 25	at No. 16 Georgia Southern	Paulson Stadium; Statesboro, GA	L 7–49	14,731	
November 1	Wofford	Johnson Hagood Stadium; Charleston, SC (rivalry)	W 7–3	10,857	
November 8	at No. 23 Chattanooga	Finley Stadium; Chattanooga, TN	W 7–3	7,209	
November 15	VMI^{†}	Johnson Hagood Stadium; Charleston, SC (Military Classic of the South)	W 28–6	17,954	
*Non-conference game; ^{†}Homecoming; Rankings from The Sports Network Poll released prior to the game
