= 1997 Alabama State Hornets football team =

American college football season

1997 Alabama State Hornets football
- Conference: Southwestern Athletic Conference
- Record: 3–8 (2–6 SWAC)
- Head coach: Houston Markham (11th season)
- Offensive coordinator: Dieter Brock (1st season)
- Home stadium: Cramton Bowl

1997 Southwestern Athletic Conference football standings
| | Conf. | | | Overall |
| Team | W | | L | W | | L |
|---|---|---|---|---|---|---|
| No. 12 Southern $ | 8 | – | 0 | 11 | – | 1 |
| No. 14 Jackson State ^ | 7 | – | 1 | 9 | – | 3 |
| Arkansas–Pine Bluff | 6 | – | 2 | 8 | – | 3 |
| Texas Southern | 4 | – | 4 | 5 | – | 6 |
| Alcorn State | 4 | – | 4 | 4 | – | 7 |
| Mississippi Valley State | 3 | – | 5 | 4 | – | 6 |
| Alabama State | 2 | – | 6 | 3 | – | 8 |
| Grambling State | 2 | – | 6 | 3 | – | 8 |
| Prairie View A&M | 0 | – | 8 | 0 | – | 9 |
$ – Conference champion; ^ – NCAA Division I-AA playoff participant; Rankings from The Sports Network Poll

The 1997 Alabama State Hornets football team represented Alabama State University as a member of the Southwestern Athletic Conference (SWAC) during the 1997 NCAA Division I-AA football season. Led by eleventh-year head coach Houston Markham, the Hornets compiled an overall record of 3–8, with a mark of 2–6 in conference play, and finished tied for seventh in the SWAC.

== Schedule ==
| Date | Opponent | Site | Result | Attendance | Source |
|---|---|---|---|---|---|
| August 31 | vs. Jackson State | Legion Field; Birmingham, AL (Labor Day Classic) | L 11–38 | 44,316 | |
| September 6 | vs. Texas Southern | Cardinal Stadium; Beaumont, TX | L 6–31 | | |
| September 13 | No. 2 Troy State* | Cramton Bowl; Montgomery, AL | L 13–20 | | |
| September 20 | Alcorn State | Cramton Bowl; Montgomery, AL | L 6–20 | | |
| September 27 | at Arkansas–Pine Bluff | Pumphrey Stadium; Pine Bluff, AR | L 10–18 | | |
| October 4 | vs. Southern | Ladd–Peebles Stadium; Mobile, AL (Gulf Coast Classic) | L 16–27 | 29,331 | |
| October 18 | Prairie View A&M | Cramton Bowl; Montgomery, AL | W 56–7 | | |
| October 25 | vs. Alabama A&M* | Legion Field; Birmingham, AL (Magic City Classic) | W 20–13 | | |
| November 9 | Grambling State | Cramton Bowl; Montgomery, AL (Note: This game was originally scheduled to be played at the Rose Bowl in Pasadena, California, but moved to Montgomery due to low ticket sales and a lack of up-front money from the promoters.) | W 20–13 | | |
| November 15 | at Mississippi Valley State | Magnolia Stadium; Itta Bena, MS | L 10–34 | | |
| November 27 | Tuskegee* | Cramton Bowl; Montgomery, AL (Turkey Day Classic) | L 16–21 | | |
*Non-conference game; Rankings from The Sports Network Poll released prior to the game
