= 1997 Texas Southern Tigers football team =

American college football season

1997 Texas Southern Tigers football
- Conference: Southwestern Athletic Conference
- Record: 5–6 (4–4 SWAC)
- Head coach: William A. Thomas (4th season)
- Home stadium: Astrodome; Robertson Stadium; Rice Stadium

1997 Southwestern Athletic Conference football standings
| | Conf. | | | Overall |
| Team | W | | L | W | | L |
|---|---|---|---|---|---|---|
| No. 12 Southern $ | 8 | – | 0 | 11 | – | 1 |
| No. 14 Jackson State ^ | 7 | – | 1 | 9 | – | 3 |
| Arkansas–Pine Bluff | 6 | – | 2 | 8 | – | 3 |
| Texas Southern | 4 | – | 4 | 5 | – | 6 |
| Alcorn State | 4 | – | 4 | 4 | – | 7 |
| Mississippi Valley State | 3 | – | 5 | 4 | – | 6 |
| Alabama State | 2 | – | 6 | 3 | – | 8 |
| Grambling State | 2 | – | 6 | 3 | – | 8 |
| Prairie View A&M | 0 | – | 8 | 0 | – | 9 |
$ – Conference champion; ^ – NCAA Division I-AA playoff participant; Rankings from The Sports Network Poll

The 1997 Texas Southern Tigers football team represented Texas Southern University as a member of the Southwestern Athletic Conference (SWAC) during the 1997 NCAA Division I-AA football season. Led by fourth-year head coach William A. Thomas, the Tigers compiled an overall record of 5–6, with a mark of 4–4 in conference play, and finished tied for fourth in the SWAC.

== Schedule ==
| Date | Opponent | Site | Result | Attendance | Source |
|---|---|---|---|---|---|
| August 30 | Prairie View A&M | Astrodome; Houston, TX (Labor Day Classic) | W 32–16 | | |
| September 6 | vs. Alabama State | Cardinal Stadium; Beaumont, TX | W 31–6 | | |
| September 20 | at Morgan State* | Hughes Stadium; Baltimore, MD | L 17–24 | | |
| September 27 | Sam Houston State* | Robertson Stadium; Houston, TX | L 7–40 | 4,040 | |
| October 4 | Jackson State | Robertson Stadium; Houston, TX | L 49–55 ^{OT} | | |
| October 11 | at Arkansas–Pine Bluff | Pumphrey Stadium; Pine Bluff, AR | L 16–36 | | |
| October 19 | at Alcorn State | Mississippi Veterans Memorial Stadium; Jackson, MS | W 10–7 | | |
| October 25 | at Mississippi Valley State | Magnolia Stadium; Itta Bena, MS | L 10–13 | | |
| November 1 | at Grambling State | Eddie G. Robinson Memorial Stadium; Grambling, LA | W 21–16 | | |
| November 8 | Lane* | Rice Stadium; Houston, TX | W 38–0 | | |
| November 16 | No. 12 Southern | Rice Stadium; Houston, TX | L 17–27 | | |
*Non-conference game; Rankings from The Sports Network Poll released prior to the game
