= 1997 Norfolk State Spartans football team =

American college football season

1997 Norfolk State Spartans football
- Conference: Mid-Eastern Athletic Conference
- Record: 3–7 (0–0 MEAC)
- Head coach: Darnell Moore (4th season)
- Home stadium: William "Dick" Price Stadium

1997 Mid-Eastern Athletic Conference football standings
| | Conf. | | | Overall |
| Team | W | | L | W | | L |
|---|---|---|---|---|---|---|
| No. 9 Hampton $^ | 7 | – | 0 | 10 | – | 2 |
| No. 22 South Carolina State | 5 | – | 2 | 9 | – | 2 |
| No. 10 Florida A&M ^ | 5 | – | 2 | 9 | – | 3 |
| Howard | 4 | – | 3 | 7 | – | 4 |
| North Carolina A&T | 3 | – | 4 | 7 | – | 4 |
| Morgan State | 2 | – | 5 | 3 | – | 7 |
| Bethune–Cookman | 1 | – | 6 | 4 | – | 7 |
| Delaware State | 1 | – | 6 | 3 | – | 8 |
| Norfolk State | 0 | – | 0 | 3 | – | 7 |
$ – Conference champion; ^ – NCAA Division I-AA playoff participant; Norfolk State games did not count as conference games.; Rankings from The Sports Network poll

The 1997 Norfolk State Spartans football team represented Norfolk State University as a member of the Mid-Eastern Athletic Conference (MEAC) during the 1997 NCAA Division I-AA football season. Led by fourth-year head coach Darnell Moore, the Spartans compiled an overall record of 3–7.

== Schedule ==
| Date | Opponent | Site | Result | Attendance | Source |
|---|---|---|---|---|---|
| August 30 | Virginia State* | William "Dick" Price Stadium; Norfolk, VA | L 7–36 | 33,872 | |
| September 6 | at Virginia Union* | Hovey Field; Richmond, VA | W 26–0 | 5,122 | |
| September 13 | at No. 16 Florida A&M* | Bragg Memorial Stadium; Tallahassee, FL | L 26–41 | 10,083 | |
| September 20 | at Delaware State* | Alumni Stadium; Dover, DE | L 21–24 | | |
| September 27 | Morgan State* | William "Dick" Price Stadium; Norfolk, VA | W 48–6 | 9,010 | |
| October 11 | at South Carolina State* | Oliver C. Dawson Stadium; Orangeburg, SC | L 25–28 | 22,789 | |
| October 18 | No. 19 Hampton* | William "Dick" Price Stadium; Norfolk, VA (rivalry) | L 2–9 | 6,521 | |
| November 1 | Howard* | William "Dick" Price Stadium; Norfolk, VA | L 24–32 | 3,712 | |
| November 8 | Liberty* | William "Dick" Price Stadium; Norfolk, VA | L 6–17 | | |
| November 15 | Bethune–Cookman* | William "Dick" Price Stadium; Norfolk, VA | W 21–7 | | |
*Non-conference game; Rankings from The Sports Network Poll released prior to the game
