= 1997 VMI Keydets football team =

American college football season

1997 VMI Keydets football
- Conference: Southern Conference
- Record: 0–11 (0–8 SoCon)
- Head coach: Ted Cain (1st season)
- Home stadium: Alumni Memorial Field

1997 Southern Conference football standings
	Conf.			Overall
Team	W		L	W		L
No. 8 Georgia Southern $^	7	–	1	10	–	3
No. 15 Appalachian State	6	–	2	7	–	4
East Tennessee State	5	–	3	7	–	4
Furman	5	–	3	7	–	4
The Citadel	4	–	4	6	–	5
Chattanooga	4	–	4	7	–	4
Western Carolina	3	–	5	3	–	8
Wofford	2	–	6	3	–	7
VMI	0	–	8	0	–	11
$ – Conference champion; ^ – NCAA Division I-AA playoff participant; Rankings from The Sports Network I-AA Poll

The 1997 VMI Keydets football team was an American football team that represented the Virginia Military Institute (VMI) as a member of the Southern Conference (SoCon) during the 1997 NCAA Division I-AA football season. In first third year under head coach Ted Cain, the team compiled an overall record of 0–11, with a mark of 0–8 in conference play, placing last in the SoCon. In January 1997 Cain was introduced as the 27th all-time head coach of the Keydets after serving as offensive coordinator at NC State.

== Schedule ==
Date	Opponent	Site	Result	Attendance	Source
September 6	at Wofford	Gibbs Stadium; Spartanburg, SC	L 13–23	7,432	
September 13	No. 3 William & Mary*	Alumni Memorial Field; Lexington, VA (rivalry)	L 12–41	7,267	
September 20	at Richmond*	City Stadium; Richmond, VA (rivalry)	L 3–56	18,417	
September 27	at Furman	Paladin Stadium; Greenville, SC	L 14–35	7,175	
October 4	No. 17 Georgia Southern	Alumni Memorial Field; Lexington, VA	L 0–49	5,208	
October 11	Chattanooga	Alumni Memorial Field; Lexington, VA	L 24–27	6,745	
October 18	at Navy*	Navy–Marine Corps Memorial Stadium; Annapolis, MD	L 7–42	30,034	
November 1	at Western Carolina	E. J. Whitmire Stadium; Cullowhee, NC	L 0–24	5,442	
November 8	No. 17 Appalachian State	Alumni Memorial Field; Lexington, VA	L 7–42	4,298	
November 15	at The Citadel	Johnson Hagood Stadium; Charleston, SC (rivalry)	L 6–28	17,954	
November 22	East Tennessee State	Alumni Memorial Field; Lexington, VA	L 7–17	4,085	
*Non-conference game; Rankings from The Sports Network Poll released prior to the game
