= 1997 Mississippi Valley State Delta Devils football team =

American college football season

1997 Mississippi Valley State Delta Devils football
- Conference: Southwestern Athletic Conference
- Record: 4–6 (3–5 SWAC)
- Head coach: Larry Dorsey (8th season)
- Home stadium: Magnolia Stadium

1997 Southwestern Athletic Conference football standings
	Conf.			Overall
Team	W		L	W		L
No. 12 Southern $	8	–	0	11	–	1
No. 14 Jackson State ^	7	–	1	9	–	3
Arkansas–Pine Bluff	6	–	2	8	–	3
Texas Southern	4	–	4	5	–	6
Alcorn State	4	–	4	4	–	7
Mississippi Valley State	3	–	5	4	–	6
Alabama State	2	–	6	3	–	8
Grambling State	2	–	6	3	–	8
Prairie View A&M	0	–	8	0	–	9
$ – Conference champion; ^ – NCAA Division I-AA playoff participant; Rankings from The Sports Network Poll

The 1997 Mississippi Valley State Delta Devils football team represented Mississippi Valley State University as a member of the Southwestern Athletic Conference (SWAC) during the 1997 NCAA Division I-AA football season. Led by eighth-year head coach Larry Dorsey, the Delta Devils compiled an overall record of 4–6, with a conference record of 3–5, and finished sixth in the SWAC.

== Schedule ==
Date	Opponent	Site	Result	Attendance	Source
August 30	vs. No. 17 Southern	Soldier Field; Chicago, IL (Chicago Football Classic)	L 30–57	22,061	
September 6	at Arkansas–Pine Bluff	Pumphrey Stadium; Pine Bluff, AR	L 7–15		
September 20	Alabama A&M*	Magnolia Stadium; Itta Bena, MS	L 8–23		
September 27	at No. 19 Jackson State	Mississippi Veterans Memorial Stadium; Jackson, MS	L 31–48		
October 11	at Grambling State	Eddie G. Robinson Memorial Stadium; Grambling, LA	L 13–20		
October 19	at Lane*	Rothrock Stadium; Jackson, TN	W 17–14		
October 25	Texas Southern	Magnolia Stadium; Itta Bena, MS	W 13–10		
November 1	at Prairie View A&M	Edward L. Blackshear Field; Prairie View, TX	W 27–0		
November 8	at Alcorn State	Jack Spinks Stadium; Lorman, MS	L 18–23		
November 15	Alabama State	Magnolia Stadium; Itta Bena, MS	W 34–10		
*Non-conference game; Rankings from The Sports Network Poll released prior to the game
