= 1997 Western Carolina Catamounts football team =

American college football season

1997 Western Carolina Catamounts football
- Conference: Southern Conference
- Record: 3–8 (3–5 SoCon)
- Head coach: Bill Bleil (1st season)
- Home stadium: E. J. Whitmire Stadium

1997 Southern Conference football standings
	Conf.			Overall
Team	W		L	W		L
No. 8 Georgia Southern $^	7	–	1	10	–	3
No. 15 Appalachian State	6	–	2	7	–	4
East Tennessee State	5	–	3	7	–	4
Furman	5	–	3	7	–	4
The Citadel	4	–	4	6	–	5
Chattanooga	4	–	4	7	–	4
Western Carolina	3	–	5	3	–	8
Wofford	2	–	6	3	–	7
VMI	0	–	8	0	–	11
$ – Conference champion; ^ – NCAA Division I-AA playoff participant; Rankings from The Sports Network I-AA Poll

The 1997 Western Carolina Catamounts team was an American football team that represented Western Carolina University as a member of the Southern Conference (SoCon) during the 1997 NCAA Division I-AA football season. In their first year under head coach Bill Bleil, the team compiled an overall record of 3–8, with a mark of 3–5 in conference play, and finished seventh in the SoCon.

== Schedule ==
Date	Opponent	Site	Result	Attendance	Source
September 13	Liberty*	E. J. Whitmire Stadium; Cullowhee, NC	L 10–17		
September 20	The Citadel	E. J. Whitmire Stadium; Cullowhee, NC	W 45–25	9,720	
September 27	at No. 14 East Tennessee State	Memorial Center; Johnson City, TN	L 18–28		
October 4	No. 18 Furman	E. J. Whitmire Stadium; Cullowhee, NC	W 17–16	10,479	
October 11	at No. 11 Georgia Southern	Paulson Stadium; Statesboro, GA	L 7–30	11,368	
October 18	Wofford	E. J. Whitmire Stadium; Cullowhee, NC	L 7–17		
October 25	at Chattanooga	Finley Stadium; Chattanooga, TN	L 21–24	6,352	
November 1	VMI	E. J. Whitmire Stadium; Cullowhee, NC	W 24–0	5,442	
November 8	at Elon*	Burlington Memorial Stadium; Burlington, NC	L 16–17		
November 15	at No. 15 Appalachian State	Kidd Brewer Stadium; Boone, NC (rivalry)	L 7–13	9,989	
November 22	at Samford*	Seibert Stadium; Homewood, AL	L 0–19		
*Non-conference game; Rankings from The Sports Network Poll released prior to the game
