= 1997 Prairie View A&M Panthers football team =

American college football season

1997 Prairie View A&M Panthers football
- Conference: Southwestern Athletic Conference
- Record: 0–9 (0–8 SWAC)
- Head coach: Greg Johnson (1st season)
- Home stadium: Edward L. Blackshear Field

1997 Southwestern Athletic Conference football standings
	Conf.			Overall
Team	W		L	W		L
No. 12 Southern $	8	–	0	11	–	1
No. 14 Jackson State ^	7	–	1	9	–	3
Arkansas–Pine Bluff	6	–	2	8	–	3
Texas Southern	4	–	4	5	–	6
Alcorn State	4	–	4	4	–	7
Mississippi Valley State	3	–	5	4	–	6
Alabama State	2	–	6	3	–	8
Grambling State	2	–	6	3	–	8
Prairie View A&M	0	–	8	0	–	9
$ – Conference champion; ^ – NCAA Division I-AA playoff participant; Rankings from The Sports Network Poll

The 1997 Prairie View A&M Panthers football team represented Prairie View A&M University as a member of the Southwestern Athletic Conference (SWAC) during the 1997 NCAA Division I-AA football season. Led by first-year head coach Greg Johnson, the Panthers compiled an overall record of 0–9, with a mark of 0–8 in conference play, and finished ninth in the SWAC.

== Schedule ==
Date	Opponent	Site	Result	Attendance	Source
August 30	at Texas Southern	Astrodome; Houston, TX (Labor Day Classic)	L 16–32		
September 13	Langston*	Edward L. Blackshear Field; Prairie View, TX	L 10–19		
September 20	at No. 13 Southern	A. W. Mumford Stadium; Baton Rouge, LA	L 7–63		
October 4	vs. Grambling State	Cotton Bowl; Dallas, TX (State Fair Classic)	L 6–33	55,119	
October 11	at Alcorn State	Jack Spinks Stadium; Lorman, MS	L 9–24		
October 18	at Alabama State	Cramton Bowl; Montgomery, AL	L 7–56		
November 1	Mississippi Valley State	Edward L. Blackshear Field; Prairie View, TX	L 0–27		
November 8	vs. Arkansas–Pine Bluff	Razorback Stadium; Texarkana, AR	L 14–48		
November 15	No. 13 Jackson State	Edward L. Blackshear Field; Prairie View, TX	L 7–20	389	
*Non-conference game; Rankings from The Sports Network Poll released prior to the game
