= 1997 Arkansas–Pine Bluff Golden Lions football team =

American college football season

1997 Arkansas–Pine Bluff Golden Lions football
- Conference: Southwestern Athletic Conference
- Record: 8–3 (6–2 SWAC)
- Head coach: Lee Hardman (5th season)
- Home stadium: Pumphrey Stadium; War Memorial Stadium

1997 Southwestern Athletic Conference football standings
	Conf.			Overall
Team	W		L	W		L
No. 12 Southern $	8	–	0	11	–	1
No. 14 Jackson State ^	7	–	1	9	–	3
Arkansas–Pine Bluff	6	–	2	8	–	3
Texas Southern	4	–	4	5	–	6
Alcorn State	4	–	4	4	–	7
Mississippi Valley State	3	–	5	4	–	6
Alabama State	2	–	6	3	–	8
Grambling State	2	–	6	3	–	8
Prairie View A&M	0	–	8	0	–	9
$ – Conference champion; ^ – NCAA Division I-AA playoff participant; Rankings from The Sports Network Poll

The 1997 Arkansas–Pine Bluff Golden Lions football team represented the University of Arkansas at Pine Bluff as a member of the Southwestern Athletic Conference (SWAC) during the 1997 NCAA Division I-AA football season. Led by fifth-year head coach Lee Hardman, the Golden Lions compiled an overall record of 8–3, with a mark of 6–2 in conference play, and finished third in the SWAC.

== Schedule ==
Date	Opponent	Site	Result	Attendance	Source
August 30	Lane*	War Memorial Stadium; Little Rock, AR	W 55–10		
September 6	Mississippi Valley State	Pumphrey Stadium; Pine Bluff, AR	W 15–7		
September 13	at No. 15 Southern	A. W. Mumford Stadium; Baton Rouge, LA	L 33–36 ^{3OT}		
September 20	vs. Howard*	Trans World Dome; St. Louis, MO (Gateway Classic)	L 21–32	23,564	
September 27	Alabama State	Pumphrey Stadium; Pine Bluff, AR	W 18–10		
October 4	Alcorn State	War Memorial Stadium; Little Rock, AR	W 20–10		
October 11	Texas Southern	Pumphrey Stadium; Pine Bluff, AR	W 36–16		
October 18	vs. Grambling State	Independence Stadium; Shreveport, LA (Red River Classic)	W 22–16	13,004	
October 25	Langston*	Pumphrey Stadium; Pine Bluff, AR	W 44–0		
November 1	at No. 16 Jackson State	Mississippi Veterans Memorial Stadium; Jackson, MS	L 8–37	15,500	
November 8	vs. Prairie View A&M	Razorback Stadium; Texarkana, AR	W 48–14		
*Non-conference game; Rankings from The Sports Network Poll released prior to the game
