= 1997 Delaware State Hornets football team =

American college football season

1997 Delaware State Hornets football
- Conference: Mid-Eastern Athletic Conference
- Record: 3–8 (1–6 MEAC)
- Head coach: John McKenzie (1st season)
- Home stadium: Alumni Stadium

1997 Mid-Eastern Athletic Conference football standings
	Conf.			Overall
Team	W		L	W		L
No. 9 Hampton $^	7	–	0	10	–	2
No. 22 South Carolina State	5	–	2	9	–	2
No. 10 Florida A&M ^	5	–	2	9	–	3
Howard	4	–	3	7	–	4
North Carolina A&T	3	–	4	7	–	4
Morgan State	2	–	5	3	–	7
Bethune–Cookman	1	–	6	4	–	7
Delaware State	1	–	6	3	–	8
Norfolk State	0	–	0	3	–	7
$ – Conference champion; ^ – NCAA Division I-AA playoff participant; Norfolk State games did not count as conference games.; Rankings from The Sports Network poll

The 1997 Delaware State Hornets football team represented Delaware State University as a member of the Mid-Eastern Athletic Conference (MEAC) during the 1997 NCAA Division I-AA football season. Led by first-year head coach John McKenzie, the Hornets compiled an overall record of 3–8, with a mark of 1–6 in conference play, and finished tied for seventh in the MEAC.

== Schedule ==
Date	Opponent	Site	Result	Attendance	Source
September 6	Cheyney*	Alumni Stadium; Dover, DE	W 50–18		
September 13	at Buffalo*	University at Buffalo Stadium; Amherst, NY	L 30–40	7,020	
September 20	Norfolk State*	Alumni Stadium; Dover, DE	W 24–21		
September 27	Liberty*	Alumni Stadium; Dover, DE	L 17–33		
October 4	Bethune–Cookman	Alumni Stadium; Dover, DE	W 35–14		
October 18	at No. 21 Florida A&M	Bragg Memorial Stadium; Tallahassee, FL	L 0–49	10,128	
October 25	Morgan State	Alumni Stadium; Dover, DE	L 7–14		
November 1	at No. 22 South Carolina State	Oliver C. Dawson Stadium; Orangeburg, SC	L 17–37	4,366	
November 8	at North Carolina A&T	Aggie Stadium; Greensboro, NC	L 14–22		
November 15	at No. 9 Hampton	Armstrong Stadium; Hampton, VA	L 20–24	14,311	
November 22	Howard	Alumni Stadium; Dover, DE	L 21–40		
*Non-conference game; Rankings from The Sports Network Poll released prior to the game
