= 1997 Alcorn State Braves football team =

American college football season

1997 Alcorn State Braves football
- Conference: Southwestern Athletic Conference
- Record: 4–7 (4–4 SWAC)
- Head coach: Cardell Jones (7th season)
- Home stadium: Jack Spinks Stadium

1997 Southwestern Athletic Conference football standings
	Conf.			Overall
Team	W		L	W		L
No. 12 Southern $	8	–	0	11	–	1
No. 14 Jackson State ^	7	–	1	9	–	3
Arkansas–Pine Bluff	6	–	2	8	–	3
Texas Southern	4	–	4	5	–	6
Alcorn State	4	–	4	4	–	7
Mississippi Valley State	3	–	5	4	–	6
Alabama State	2	–	6	3	–	8
Grambling State	2	–	6	3	–	8
Prairie View A&M	0	–	8	0	–	9
$ – Conference champion; ^ – NCAA Division I-AA playoff participant; Rankings from The Sports Network Poll

The 1997 Alcorn State Braves football team represented Alcorn State University as a member of the Southwestern Athletic Conference (SWAC) during the 1997 NCAA Division I-AA football season. Led by seventh-year head coach Cardell Jones, the Braves compiled an overall record of 4–7, with a conference record of 4–4, and finished tied for fourth in the SWAC.

== Schedule ==
Date	Opponent	Site	Result	Attendance	Source
August 30	vs. No. 2 Troy State*	Ernest F. Ladd Memorial Stadium; Mobile, AL	L 0–30		
September 6	Grambling State	Jack Spinks Stadium; Lorman, MS	W 44–20		
September 13	No. 5 Western Illinois*	Jack Spinks Stadium; Lorman, MS	L 17–31	4,121	
September 20	at Alabama State	Cramton Bowl; Montgomery, AL	W 20–6		
September 27	Samford*	Jack Spinks Stadium; Lorman, MS	L 16–21		
October 4	at Arkansas–Pine Bluff	War Memorial Stadium; Little Rock, AR	L 10–20		
October 11	Prairie View A&M	Jack Spinks Stadium; Lorman, MS	W 24–9		
October 19	Texas Southern	Mississippi Veterans Memorial Stadium; Jackson, MS	L 7–10		
October 25	at No. 8 Southern	A. W. Mumford Stadium; Baton Rouge, LA	L 16–25		
November 8	Mississippi Valley State	Jack Spinks Stadium; Lorman, MS	W 23–18		
November 22	at No. 14 Jackson State	Mississippi Veterans Memorial Stadium; Jackson, MS (Capital City Classic)	L 15–54	55,000	
*Non-conference game; Rankings from The Sports Network Poll released prior to the game
