= 1997 Middle Tennessee Blue Raiders football team =

American college football season

1997 Middle Tennessee Blue Raiders football
- Conference: Ohio Valley Conference
- Record: 4–6 (2–5 OVC)
- Head coach: Boots Donnelly (19th season)
- Offensive coordinator: John Bobo (1st season)
- Defensive coordinator: Tom Fiveash (1st season)
- Home stadium: Johnny "Red" Floyd Stadium

1997 Ohio Valley Conference football standings
	Conf.			Overall
Team	W		L	W		L
No. 19 Eastern Kentucky $^	7	–	0	8	–	4
No. 16 Eastern Illinois	5	–	2	8	–	3
Murray State	5	–	2	7	–	4
Tennessee Tech	4	–	3	6	–	5
Tennessee State	4	–	3	4	–	7
Middle Tennessee	2	–	5	4	–	6
Southeast Missouri State	1	–	6	4	–	7
Tennessee–Martin	0	–	7	1	–	10
$ – Conference champion; ^ – NCAA Division I-AA playoff participant; Rankings from The Sports Network poll

The 1997 Middle Tennessee Blue Raiders football team represented Middle Tennessee State University in the 1997 NCAA Division I-AA football season

== Schedule ==
Date	Opponent	Site	Result	Attendance	Source
September 6	at Tennessee State	Hale Stadium; Nashville, TN	L 16–25	14,983	
September 13	at Chattanooga*	Chamberlain Field; Chattanooga, TN	L 24–33	8,298 \	
September 27	Murray State	Johnny "Red" Floyd Stadium; Murfreesboro, TN	L 17–35	7,897	
October 4	Jacksonville State*	Johnny "Red" Floyd Stadium; Murfreesboro, TN	W 27–16	6,911	
October 11	at Tennessee–Martin	Graham Stadium; Martin, TN	W 37–24	3,108	
October 18	at No. 10 Eastern Illinois	O'Brien Field; Charleston, IL	L 17–30	8,700	
October 25	Southeast Missouri State	Johnny "Red" Floyd Stadium; Murfreesboro, TN	W 55–6	6,823	
November 8	Austin Peay*	Johnny "Red" Floyd Stadium; Murfreesboro, TN	W 59–10	4,103	
November 15	at No. 23 Eastern Kentucky	Roy Kidd Stadium; Richmond, KY	L 20–35	6,400	
November 22	at Tennessee Tech	Tucker Stadium; Cookeville, TN	L 20–30	4,216	
*Non-conference game; Rankings from The Sports Network Poll released prior to the game

== After the season ==
=== NFL draft ===
The following Blue Raider was selected in the 1998 NFL draft following the season.

Round	Pick	Player	Position	NFL club
3	86	Jonathan Quinn	Quarterback	Jacksonville Jaguars
