= 1997 Bethune–Cookman Wildcats football team =

American college football season

1997 Bethune–Cookman Wildcats football
- Conference: Mid-Eastern Athletic Conference
- Record: 4–7 (1–6 MEAC)
- Head coach: Alvin Wyatt (1st season)
- Home stadium: Municipal Stadium

1997 Mid-Eastern Athletic Conference football standings
	Conf.			Overall
Team	W		L	W		L
No. 9 Hampton $^	7	–	0	10	–	2
No. 22 South Carolina State	5	–	2	9	–	2
No. 10 Florida A&M ^	5	–	2	9	–	3
Howard	4	–	3	7	–	4
North Carolina A&T	3	–	4	7	–	4
Morgan State	2	–	5	3	–	7
Bethune–Cookman	1	–	6	4	–	7
Delaware State	1	–	6	3	–	8
Norfolk State	0	–	0	3	–	7
$ – Conference champion; ^ – NCAA Division I-AA playoff participant; Norfolk State games did not count as conference games.; Rankings from The Sports Network poll

The 1997 Bethune–Cookman Wildcats football team represented Bethune–Cookman College (now known as Bethune–Cookman University) as a member of the Mid-Eastern Athletic Conference (MEAC) during the 1997 NCAA Division I-AA football season. Led by first-year head coach Alvin Wyatt, the Wildcats compiled an overall record of 4–7, with a mark of 1–6 in conference play, and finished tied for seventh in the MEAC.

== Schedule ==
Date	Opponent	Site	Result	Attendance	Source
September 6	at Morris Brown*	Herndon Stadium; Atlanta, GA	W 35–20		
September 13	vs. Morgan State	Lockhart Stadium; Fort Lauderdale, FL (South Florida Football Classic)	L 15–18	6,500	
September 20	Fayetteville State*	Municipal Stadium; Daytona Beach, FL	W 14–0	3,500	
September 27	Cheyney*	Municipal Stadium; Daytona Beach, FL	W 44–0		
October 4	at Delaware State	Alumni Stadium; Dover, DE	L 14–35		
October 11	vs. Howard	Alltel Stadium; Jacksonville, FL	L 7–14	9,127	
October 18	No. 23 South Carolina State	Municipal Stadium; Daytona Beach, FL	L 10–17	11,212	
November 1	North Carolina A&T	Municipal Stadium; Daytona Beach, FL	W 26–25		
November 8	No. 12 Hampton	Municipal Stadium; Daytona Beach, FL	L 0–27	3,500	
November 15	at Norfolk State*	William "Dick" Price Stadium; Norfolk, VA	L 7–21		
November 22	vs. No. 10 Florida A&M	Florida Citrus Bowl; Orlando, FL (Florida Classic)	L 35–52	56,531	
*Non-conference game; Rankings from The Sports Network Poll released prior to the game
