= 1997 Morgan State Bears football team =

American college football season

1997 Morgan State Bears football
- Conference: Mid-Eastern Athletic Conference
- Record: 3–7 (2–5 MEAC)
- Head coach: Stump Mitchell (2nd season)
- Home stadium: Hughes Stadium

1997 Mid-Eastern Athletic Conference football standings
	Conf.			Overall
Team	W		L	W		L
No. 9 Hampton $^	7	–	0	10	–	2
No. 22 South Carolina State	5	–	2	9	–	2
No. 10 Florida A&M ^	5	–	2	9	–	3
Howard	4	–	3	7	–	4
North Carolina A&T	3	–	4	7	–	4
Morgan State	2	–	5	3	–	7
Bethune–Cookman	1	–	6	4	–	7
Delaware State	1	–	6	3	–	8
Norfolk State	0	–	0	3	–	7
$ – Conference champion; ^ – NCAA Division I-AA playoff participant; Norfolk State games did not count as conference games.; Rankings from The Sports Network poll

The 1997 Morgan State Bears football team represented Morgan State University as a member of the Mid-Eastern Athletic Conference (MEAC) during the 1997 NCAA Division I-AA football season. Led by second-year head coach Stump Mitchell, the Bears compiled an overall record of 3–7, with a mark of 2–5 in conference play, and finished sixth in the MEAC.

== Schedule ==
Date	Opponent	Site	Result	Attendance	Source
August 30	at Morehouse*	B. T. Harvey Stadium; Atlanta, GA (Ennis Cosby Classic)	L 14–24	5,204	
September 13	vs. Bethune–Cookman	Lockhart Stadium; Fort Lauderdale, FL (South Florida Football Classic)	W 18–15	6,500	
September 20	Texas Southern*	Hughes Stadium; Baltimore, MD	W 24–17		
September 27	at Norfolk State*	William "Dick" Price Stadium; Norfolk, VA	L 6–48	9,010	
October 4	South Carolina State	Hughes Stadium; Baltimore, MD	L 27–34 ^{OT}	3,750	
October 18	North Carolina A&T	Hughes Stadium; Baltimore, MD	L 6–7		
October 25	at Delaware State	Alumni Stadium; Dover, DE	W 14–7		
November 1	vs. No. 17 Florida A&M	Chris Gillman Stadium; Kingsland, GA	L 13–42		
November 15	vs. Howard	Qualcomm Stadium; San Diego, CA (Gold Coast Classic, rivalry)	L 27–30	9,968	
November 22	at No. 9 Hampton	Armstrong Stadium; Hampton, VA	L 0–10	4,015	
*Non-conference game; Rankings from The Sports Network Poll released prior to the game
