= 1997 Jackson State Tigers football team =

American college football season

1997 Jackson State Tigers football

NCAA Division I-AA First Round, L 24–31 vs. Western Illinois
- Conference: Southwestern Athletic Conference

Ranking
- Sports Network: No. 14
- Record: 9–3 (7–1 SWAC)
- Head coach: James Carson (6th season)
- Home stadium: Mississippi Veterans Memorial Stadium

1997 Southwestern Athletic Conference football standings
	Conf.			Overall
Team	W		L	W		L
No. 12 Southern $	8	–	0	11	–	1
No. 14 Jackson State ^	7	–	1	9	–	3
Arkansas–Pine Bluff	6	–	2	8	–	3
Texas Southern	4	–	4	5	–	6
Alcorn State	4	–	4	4	–	7
Mississippi Valley State	3	–	5	4	–	6
Alabama State	2	–	6	3	–	8
Grambling State	2	–	6	3	–	8
Prairie View A&M	0	–	8	0	–	9
$ – Conference champion; ^ – NCAA Division I-AA playoff participant; Rankings from The Sports Network Poll

The 1997 Jackson State Tigers football team represented Jackson State University as a member of the Southwestern Athletic Conference (SWAC) during the 1997 NCAA Division I-AA football season. Led by sixth-year head coach James Carson, the Tigers compiled an overall record of 9–3 and a mark of 7–1 in conference play, and finished second in the SWAC. Jackson State finished their season with a loss against Western Illinois in the Division I-AA playoffs.

== Schedule ==
Date	Opponent	Rank	Site	Result	Attendance	Source
August 31	vs. Alabama State	No. 14	Legion Field; Birmingham, AL (Labor Day Classic)	W 38–11	44,316	
September 6	Howard*	No. 14	Mississippi Veterans Memorial Stadium; Jackson, MS	W 35–33	28,537	
September 13	vs. Tennessee State*	No. 12	Liberty Bowl Memorial Stadium; Memphis, TN (Southern Heritage Classic)	W 31–28	61,171	
September 20	at No. 15 Florida A&M*	No. 8	Bragg Memorial Stadium; Tallahassee, FL	L 14–30	10,473	
September 27	Mississippi Valley State	No. 19	Mississippi Veterans Memorial Stadium; Jackson, MS	W 48–31		
October 4	at Texas Southern	No. 19	Robertson Stadium; Houston, TX	W 55–49 ^{OT}		
October 18	No. 8 Southern	No. 13	Mississippi Veterans Memorial Stadium; Jackson, MS (rivalry)	L 8–28	60,319	
October 25	Grambling State	No. 20	Mississippi Veterans Memorial Stadium; Jackson, MS	W 23–0	35,430	
November 1	Arkansas–Pine Bluff	No. 16	Mississippi Veterans Memorial Stadium; Jackson, MS	W 37–8	15,500	
November 15	at Prairie View A&M	No. 13	Edward L. Blackshear Field; Prairie View, TX	W 20–7	389	
November 22	Alcorn State	No. 14	Mississippi Veterans Memorial Stadium; Jackson, MS (Capital City Classic)	W 54–15	55,000	
November 29	at No. 2 Western Illinois*	No. 14	Hanson Field; Macomb, IL (NCAA Division I-AA First Round)	L 24–31	8,980	
*Non-conference game; Rankings from The Sports Network Poll released prior to the game
