= 1997 Eastern Illinois Panthers football team =

American college football season

1997 Eastern Illinois Panthers football
- Conference: Ohio Valley Conference

Ranking
- Sports Network: No. 16
- Record: 8–3 (5–2 OVC)
- Head coach: Bob Spoo (11th season)
- Offensive coordinator: Roy Wittke (8th season)
- Home stadium: O'Brien Stadium

1997 Ohio Valley Conference football standings
	Conf.			Overall
Team	W		L	W		L
No. 19 Eastern Kentucky $^	7	–	0	8	–	4
No. 16 Eastern Illinois	5	–	2	8	–	3
Murray State	5	–	2	7	–	4
Tennessee Tech	4	–	3	6	–	5
Tennessee State	4	–	3	4	–	7
Middle Tennessee	2	–	5	4	–	6
Southeast Missouri State	1	–	6	4	–	7
Tennessee–Martin	0	–	7	1	–	10
$ – Conference champion; ^ – NCAA Division I-AA playoff participant; Rankings from The Sports Network poll

The 1997 Eastern Illinois Panthers represented Eastern Illinois University as a member of the Ohio Valley Conference (OVC) during the 1997 NCAA Division I-AA football season.

== Schedule ==
Date	Opponent	Rank	Site	Result	Attendance	Source
August 28	at No. 9 Western Illinois*	No. 6	Hanson Field; Macomb, IL	L 0–41	6,700	
September 6	UT Martin	No. 24	O'Brien Stadium; Charleston, IL	W 42–6	5,430	
September 13	Saint Joseph's (IN)*	No. 19	O'Brien Stadium; Charleston, IL	W 41–20		
September 20	at Illinois State*	No. 19	Hancock Stadium; Normal, IL (rivalry)	W 25–14	9,142	
September 27	at Tennessee Tech	No. 16	Tucker Stadium; Cookeville, Tennessee	W 10–7		
October 4	at Southeast Missouri State	No. 15	Houck Stadium; Cape Girardeau, Missouri	W 32–7		
October 18	Middle Tennessee	No. 10	O'Brien Stadium; Charleston, IL	W 30–17	8,700	
October 25	Austin Peay*	No. 9	O'Brien Stadium; Charleston, IL	W 42–14		
November 1	at Indiana State*	No. 8	Memorial Stadium; Terre Haute, IN	W 21–14		
November 8	at Murray State	No. 9	Roy Stewart Stadium; Murray, Kentucky	L 17–24		
November 22	at Eastern Kentucky	No. 16	O'Brien Stadium; Charleston, IL	L 7–49	2,120	
*Non-conference game; Rankings from The Sports Network Poll released prior to the game
