= 1997 Furman Paladins football team =

American college football season

1997 Furman Paladins football
- Conference: Southern Conference
- Record: 7–4 (5–3 SoCon)
- Head coach: Bobby Johnson (4th season)
- Captains: Orlando Ruff; Jay Thier; Jeremy Osborne; Jody Wade
- Home stadium: Paladin Stadium

1997 Southern Conference football standings
	Conf.			Overall
Team	W		L	W		L
No. 8 Georgia Southern $^	7	–	1	10	–	3
No. 15 Appalachian State	6	–	2	7	–	4
East Tennessee State	5	–	3	7	–	4
Furman	5	–	3	7	–	4
The Citadel	4	–	4	6	–	5
Chattanooga	4	–	4	7	–	4
Western Carolina	3	–	5	3	–	8
Wofford	2	–	6	3	–	7
VMI	0	–	8	0	–	11
$ – Conference champion; ^ – NCAA Division I-AA playoff participant; Rankings from The Sports Network I-AA Poll

The 1997 Furman Paladins football team was an American football team that represented Furman University as a member of the Southern Conference (SoCon) during the 1997 NCAA Division I-AA football season. In their fourth year under head coach Bobby Johnson, the Paladins compiled an overall record of 7–4, with a mark of 5–3 in conference play, finishing tied for third in the SoCon.

== Schedule ==
Date	Opponent	Rank	Site	Result	Attendance	Source
September 4	at Samford*	No. 13	Seibert Stadium; Homewood, AL	W 29–10	4,763	
September 13	at South Carolina State*	No. 10	Oliver C. Dawson Stadium; Orangeburg, SC	L 6–17	6,626	
September 27	VMI	No. 18	Paladin Stadium; Greenville, SC	W 35–14	7,175	
October 4	at Western Carolina	No. 18	Whitmire Stadium; Cullowhee, NC	L 16–17	10,479	
October 11	No. 14 Appalachian State		Paladin Stadium; Greenville, SC	W 24–22	9,686	
October 18	at The Citadel	No. 22	Johnson Hagood Stadium; Charleston, SC (rivalry)	W 21–7	11,245	
October 25	No. 13 East Tennessee State	No. 19	Paladin Stadium; Greenville, SC	L 28–58	9,105	
November 1	Elon*		Paladin Stadium; Greenville, SC	W 38–20	7,817	
November 8	at No. 11 Georgia Southern		Paulson Stadium; Statesboro, GA	L 13–30	18,269	
November 15	Wofford*		Paladin Stadium; Greenville, SC (rivalry)	W 28–7	9,560	
November 22	at Chattanooga		Chamberlain Field; Chattanooga, TN	W 43–23	10,102	
*Non-conference game; Rankings from The Sports Network Poll released prior to the game
