= 1997 Maine Black Bears football team =

American college football season

1997 Maine Black Bears football
- Conference: Atlantic 10 Conference
- New England Division
- Record: 5–6 (4–4 A-10)
- Head coach: Jack Cosgrove (5th season)
- Offensive coordinator: Joe Gilbert (2nd season)
- Defensive coordinator: Neil McGrath (3rd season)
- Captains: Derek Carter; John Tennett
- Home stadium: Alfond Stadium

1997 Atlantic 10 Conference football standings
	Conf.			Overall
Team	W		L	W		L
New England Division
New Hampshire x	5	–	3	5	–	6
Connecticut	4	–	4	7	–	4
Maine	4	–	4	5	–	6
Rhode Island	2	–	6	2	–	9
Boston University	1	–	7	1	–	10
UMass	1	–	7	2	–	9
Mid-Atlantic Division
No. 1 Villanova x$^	8	–	0	12	–	1
No. 3 Delaware ^	7	–	1	12	–	2
No. 20 Northeastern	5	–	3	8	–	3
Richmond	4	–	4	6	–	5
William & Mary	4	–	4	7	–	4
James Madison	3	–	5	5	–	6
$ – Conference champion; x – Division champion/co-champions; ^ – NCAA Division I-AA playoff participant; Rankings from The Sports Network poll

The 1997 Maine Black Bears football team represented the University of Maine in the 1997 NCAA Division I-AA football season. They played their home games at Alumni Stadium as a member of the Atlantic 10 Conference. They were led by fifth-year head coach Jack Cosgrove. The Black Bears finished the season 5–6, 4–4 in conference play, to finish tied for second in the New England Division.

== Schedule ==
Date	Opponent	Site	Result	Attendance	Source
September 6	at Rhode Island	Meade Stadium; Kingston, RI	W 30–14	4,670	
September 13	UMass	Alumni Stadium; Orono, ME	W 49–6	4,363	
September 20	at No. 10 Villanova	Villanova Stadium; Villanova, PA	L 14–34		
September 27	No. 25 James Madison	Alumni Stadium; Orono, ME	L 22–24	5,220	
October 4	at Richmond	UR Stadium; Richmond, VA	L 14–17	10,204	
October 11	No. 24 Connecticut	Alumni Stadium; Orono, ME	W 49–47 ^{3OT}		
October 18	Boston University	Alumni Stadium; Orono, ME	W 62–29		
October 25	at New Hampshire	Cowell Stadium; Durham, NH (Battle for the Brice–Cowell Musket)	L 7–24		
November 8	at Buffalo*	University at Buffalo Stadium; Buffalo, NY	W 52–13		
November 15	at No. 24 Northeastern*	Parsons Field; Brookline, MA	L 17–23		
November 22	at No. 17 Hofstra*	Hofstra Stadium; Hempstead, NY	L 32–44		
*Non-conference game; Rankings from The Sports Network Poll released prior to the game
