= 1997 Georgia Southern Eagles football team =

American college football season

1997 Georgia Southern Eagles football

SoCon champion

NCAA Division I-AA Quarterfinal, L 7–16 at Delaware
- Conference: Southern Conference

Ranking
- Sports Network: No. 8
- Record: 10–3 (7–1 SoCon)
- Head coach: Paul Johnson (1st season)
- Offensive coordinator: Mike Sewak (1st season)
- Offensive scheme: Triple option
- Defensive coordinator: Rusty Russell (1st season)
- Base defense: 4–3
- Home stadium: Paulson Stadium

1997 Southern Conference football standings
	Conf.			Overall
Team	W		L	W		L
No. 8 Georgia Southern $^	7	–	1	10	–	3
No. 15 Appalachian State	6	–	2	7	–	4
East Tennessee State	5	–	3	7	–	4
Furman	5	–	3	7	–	4
The Citadel	4	–	4	6	–	5
Chattanooga	4	–	4	7	–	4
Western Carolina	3	–	5	3	–	8
Wofford	2	–	6	3	–	7
VMI	0	–	8	0	–	11
$ – Conference champion; ^ – NCAA Division I-AA playoff participant; Rankings from The Sports Network poll

The 1997 Georgia Southern Eagles football team represented Georgia Southern University as a member of the Southern Conference (SoCon) during the 1997 NCAA Division I-AA football season. Led by first-year head coach Paul Johnson, the Eagles compiled an overall record of 10–3 with a mark of 7–1 in conference play, winning the SoCon title. Georgia Southern advanced to the NCAA Division I-AA Football Championship playoffs, where they beat Florida A&M in the first round before losing to Delaware in the quarterfinals. The Eagles played their home games at Paulson Stadium in Statesboro, Georgia.

== Schedule ==
Date	Opponent	Rank	Site	Result	Attendance	Source
August 30	Valdosta State*		Paulson Stadium; Statesboro, GA	W 45–26	10,572	
September 6	No. 3 William and Mary*	No. 23	Paulson Stadium; Statesboro, GA	L 28–29	10,329	
September 20	at Wofford	No. 20	Gibbs Stadium; Spartanburg, SC	W 22–7	7,236	
September 27	No. 22 Chattanooga	No. 20	Paulson Stadium; Statesboro, GA	W 37–10	10,128	
October 4	at VMI	No. 17	Alumni Memorial Field; Lexington, VA	W 49–0	5,208	
October 11	Western Carolina	No. 11	Paulson Stadium; Statesboro, GA	W 30–7	11,368	
October 18	at Appalachian State	No. 9	Kidd Brewer Stadium; Boone, NC	L 12–24	13,887	
October 25	The Citadel	No. 16	Paulson Stadium; Statesboro, GA	W 49–7	14,731	
November 1	at No. 12 East Tennessee State	No. 14	Memorial Center; Johnson City, TN	W 38–30	5,629	
November 8	Furman	No. 11	Paulson Stadium; Statesboro, GA	W 30–13	18,269	
November 15	at South Florida*	No. 8	Houlihan's Stadium; Tampa, FL	W 24–23	30,470	
November 29	No. 10 Florida A&M*	No. 8	Paulson Stadium; Statesboro, GA (NCAA Division I-AA First Round)	W 52–37	10,409	
December 6	at No. 3 Delaware*	No. 8	Delaware Stadium; Newark, DE (NCAA Division I-AA Quarterfinal)	L 7–16	11,203	
*Non-conference game; Rankings from The Sports Network Poll released prior to the game
