= 1997 UMass Minutemen football team =

American college football season

1997 UMass Minutemen football
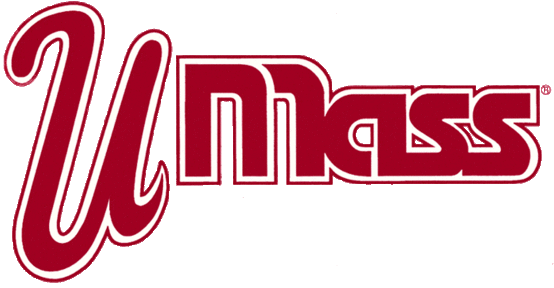
- Conference: Atlantic 10 Conference
- New England Division
- Record: 2–9 (1–7 A-10)
- Head coach: Mike Hodges (6th season)
- Defensive coordinator: Jerry Azzinaro (2nd season)
- Home stadium: Warren McGuirk Alumni Stadium

1997 Atlantic 10 Conference football standings
	Conf.			Overall
Team	W		L	W		L
New England Division
New Hampshire x	5	–	3	5	–	6
Connecticut	4	–	4	7	–	4
Maine	4	–	4	5	–	6
Rhode Island	2	–	6	2	–	9
Boston University	1	–	7	1	–	10
UMass	1	–	7	2	–	9
Mid-Atlantic Division
No. 1 Villanova x$^	8	–	0	12	–	1
No. 3 Delaware ^	7	–	1	12	–	2
No. 20 Northeastern	5	–	3	8	–	3
Richmond	4	–	4	6	–	5
William & Mary	4	–	4	7	–	4
James Madison	3	–	5	5	–	6
$ – Conference champion; x – Division champion/co-champions; ^ – NCAA Division I-AA playoff participant; Rankings from The Sports Network poll

The 1997 UMass Minutemen football team represented the University of Massachusetts Amherst in the 1997 NCAA Division I-AA football season, as a member of the Atlantic 10 Conference. The team was coached by Mike Hodges and played its home games at Warren McGuirk Alumni Stadium in Hadley, Massachusetts. It was Hodges' last as head coach, as he would take the position of assistant athletic director at the university in the offseason. The 1997 season was a tough one for the Minutemen as they stumbled to their worst record since 1953. UMass finished the season with a record of 2–9 overall and 1–7 in conference play.

== Schedule ==
Date	Time	Opponent	Site	TV	Result	Attendance	Source
August 30	1:00 p.m.	Richmond	McGuirk Stadium; Hadley, MA		L 6–21	10,837	
September 13	1:00 p.m.	at Maine	Alumni Stadium; Orono, ME		L 6–49	4,363	
September 20	6:00 p.m.	at James Madison	Bridgeforth Stadium; Harrisonburg, VA		L 10–13	11,300	
September 27	1:00 p.m.	Rhode Island^{†}	McGuirk Stadium; Hadley, MA		W 18–14	8,218	
October 4	12:00 p.m.	New Hampshire	McGuirk Stadium; Hadley, MA (rivalry)	A10 TV	L 10–28	14,835	
October 11	1:00 p.m.	at No. 4 Villanova	Villanova Stadium; Philadelphia, PA	NESN	L 27–49	7,109	
October 18	1:30 p.m.	at Buffalo*	University at Buffalo Stadium; Amherst, NY (rivalry)		W 26–20	6,052	
October 25	1:00 p.m.	No. 4 Delaware*	McGuirk Stadium; Hadley, MA		L 9–40	5,317	
November 1	12:30 p.m.	No. 24 Hofstra*	McGuirk Stadium; Hadley, MA		L 13–51	2,510	
November 8	1:00 p.m.	at Boston University	Nickerson Field; Boston, MA		L 8–33	3,140	
November 15	12:30 p.m.	Connecticut	McGuirk Stadium; Hadley, MA (rivalry)		L 16–49	2,870	
*Non-conference game; ^{†}Homecoming; Rankings from The Sports Network Poll released prior to the game; All times are in Eastern time
