= 1997 North Carolina A&T Aggies football team =

American college football season

1997 North Carolina A&T Aggies football
- Conference: Mid-Eastern Athletic Conference
- Record: 7–4 (3–4 MEAC)
- Head coach: Bill Hayes (10th season)
- Home stadium: Aggie Stadium

1997 Mid-Eastern Athletic Conference football standings
	Conf.			Overall
Team	W		L	W		L
No. 9 Hampton $^	7	–	0	10	–	2
No. 22 South Carolina State	5	–	2	9	–	2
No. 10 Florida A&M ^	5	–	2	9	–	3
Howard	4	–	3	7	–	4
North Carolina A&T	3	–	4	7	–	4
Morgan State	2	–	5	3	–	7
Bethune–Cookman	1	–	6	4	–	7
Delaware State	1	–	6	3	–	8
Norfolk State	0	–	0	3	–	7
$ – Conference champion; ^ – NCAA Division I-AA playoff participant; Norfolk State games did not count as conference games.; Rankings from The Sports Network poll

The 1997 North Carolina A&T Aggies football team represented North Carolina A&T State University as a member of the Mid-Eastern Athletic Conference (MEAC) during the 1997 NCAA Division I-AA football season. Led by 10th-year head coach Bill Hayes, the Aggies compiled an overall record of 7–4, with a mark of 3–4 in conference play, and finished fifth in the MEAC.

== Schedule ==
Date	Opponent	Rank	Site	Result	Attendance	Source
August 30	vs. North Carolina Central*		Carter–Finley Stadium; Raleigh, NC (rivalry)	W 36–7	48,001	
September 6	at Winston-Salem State*		Bowman Gray Stadium; Winston-Salem, NC (rivalry)	W 27–7	18,000	
September 20	Hampton		Aggie Stadium; Greensboro, NC	L 2–7	15,278	
October 4	vs. Tennessee State*		RCA Dome; Indianapolis, IN (Circle City Classic)	W 49–37	59,011	
October 11	No. 16 Florida A&M		Aggie Stadium; Greensboro, NC	W 40–37 ^{2OT}	12,597	
October 18	at Morgan State		Hughes Stadium; Baltimore, MD	W 7–6		
October 25	Howard	No. 24	Aggie Stadium; Greensboro, NC	L 13–21	27,686	
November 1	at Bethune–Cookman		Municipal Stadium; Daytona Beach, FL	L 25–26		
November 8	Delaware State		Aggie Stadium; Greensboro, NC	W 22–14		
November 15	at Grambling State*		Eddie G. Robinson Memorial Stadium; Grambling, LA	W 37–35		
November 22	vs. No. 22 South Carolina State		Ericsson Stadium; Charlotte, NC (Carolinas Classic, rivalry)	L 18–33	22,642	
*Non-conference game; Rankings from The Sports Network Poll released prior to the game
