= 1997 Howard Bison football team =

American college football season

1997 Howard Bison football
- Conference: Mid-Eastern Athletic Conference
- Record: 7–4 (4–3 MEAC)
- Head coach: Steve Wilson (9th season)
- Home stadium: William H. Greene Stadium; RFK Stadium

1997 Mid-Eastern Athletic Conference football standings
	Conf.			Overall
Team	W		L	W		L
No. 9 Hampton $^	7	–	0	10	–	2
No. 22 South Carolina State	5	–	2	9	–	2
No. 10 Florida A&M ^	5	–	2	9	–	3
Howard	4	–	3	7	–	4
North Carolina A&T	3	–	4	7	–	4
Morgan State	2	–	5	3	–	7
Bethune–Cookman	1	–	6	4	–	7
Delaware State	1	–	6	3	–	8
Norfolk State	0	–	0	3	–	7
$ – Conference champion; ^ – NCAA Division I-AA playoff participant; Norfolk State games did not count as conference games.; Rankings from The Sports Network poll

The 1997 Howard Bison football team represented Howard University as a member of the Mid-Eastern Athletic Conference (MEAC) during the 1997 NCAA Division I-AA football season. Led by ninth-year head coach Steve Wilson, the Bison compiled an overall record of 7–4, with a conference record of 4–3, and finished fourth in the MEAC.

== Schedule ==
Date	Opponent	Site	Result	Attendance	Source
September 6	at No. 14 Jackson State*	Mississippi Veterans Memorial Stadium; Jackson, MS	L 33–35	28,537	
September 13	Hampton	RFK Stadium; Washington, DC (Greater Washington Urban League Football Classic, rivalry)	L 21–49	11,711	
September 20	vs. Arkansas–Pine Bluff*	Trans World Dome; St. Louis, MO (Gateway Classic)	W 32–21	23,564	
September 27	No. 12 Florida A&M	William H. Greene Stadium; Washington, DC	L 15–24		
October 11	vs. Bethune–Cookman	Alltel Stadium; Jacksonville, FL	W 14–7	9,127	
October 18	Morehouse*^{†}	William H. Greene Stadium; Washington, DC	W 52–0	> 14,000	
October 25	at No. 24 North Carolina A&T	Aggie Stadium; Greensboro, NC	W 21–13	27,686	
November 1	at Norfolk State*	William "Dick" Price Stadium; Norfolk, VA	W 32–24	3,712	
November 8	No. 19 South Carolina State	William H. Greene Stadium; Washington, DC	L 18–27	6,397	
November 15	vs. Morgan State	Qualcomm Stadium; San Diego, CA (Gold Coast Classic, rivalry)	W 30–27	9,968	
November 22	at Delaware State	Alumni Stadium; Dover, DE	W 40–21		
*Non-conference game; ^{†}Homecoming; Rankings from The Sports Network Poll released prior to the game
