= 1997 Florida A&M Rattlers football team =

American college football season

1997 Florida A&M Rattlers football

NCAA Division I-AA First Round, L 37–52 at Georgia Southern
- Conference: Mid-Eastern Athletic Conference

Ranking
- Sports Network: No. 10
- Record: 9–3 (5–2 MEAC)
- Head coach: Billy Joe (4th season)
- Offensive scheme: Gulf Coast
- Home stadium: Bragg Memorial Stadium

1997 Mid-Eastern Athletic Conference football standings
	Conf.			Overall
Team	W		L	W		L
No. 9 Hampton $^	7	–	0	10	–	2
No. 22 South Carolina State	5	–	2	9	–	2
No. 10 Florida A&M ^	5	–	2	9	–	3
Howard	4	–	3	7	–	4
North Carolina A&T	3	–	4	7	–	4
Morgan State	2	–	5	3	–	7
Bethune–Cookman	1	–	6	4	–	7
Delaware State	1	–	6	3	–	8
Norfolk State	0	–	0	3	–	7
$ – Conference champion; ^ – NCAA Division I-AA playoff participant; Norfolk State games did not count as conference games.; Rankings from The Sports Network poll

The 1997 Florida A&M Rattlers football team represented Florida A&M University as a member of the Mid-Eastern Athletic Conference (MEAC) during the 1997 NCAA Division I-AA football season. Led by fourth-year head coach Billy Joe, the Rattlers compiled an overall record of 9–3, with a mark of 5–2 in conference play, and finished tied for second in the MEAC. Florida A&M completed their season with a loss against Georgia Southern in the NCAA Division I-AA First Round.

== Schedule ==
Date	Opponent	Rank	Site	Result	Attendance	Source
August 30	Tennessee State*	No. 18	Bragg Memorial Stadium; Tallahassee, FL	W 43–28	18,631	
September 13	Norfolk State*	No. 16	Bragg Memorial Stadium; Tallahassee, FL	W 41–26	10,083	
September 20	No. 8 Jackson State*	No. 15	Bragg Memorial Stadium; Tallahassee, FL	W 30–14	10,473	
September 27	at Howard	No. 12	William H. Greene Stadium; Washington, DC	W 24–15		
October 4	at Hampton	No. 12	Armstrong Stadium; Hampton, VA	L 15–18	12,207	
October 11	at North Carolina A&T	No. 16	Aggie Stadium; Greensboro, NC	L 37–40 ^{2OT}	12,597	
October 18	Delaware State	No. 21	Bragg Memorial Stadium; Tallahassee, FL	W 49–0	10,128	
November 1	vs. Morgan State	No. 17	Chris Gillman Stadium; Kingsland, GA	W 42–13		
November 8	No. 6 Southern*	No. 15	Bragg Memorial Stadium; Tallahassee, FL	W 33–3	33,441	
November 15	at No. 17 South Carolina State	No. 10	Oliver C. Dawson Stadium; Orangeburg, SC	W 22–20	12,784	
November 22	vs. Bethune–Cookman	No. 10	Florida Citrus Bowl; Orlando, FL (Florida Classic)	W 52–35	56,531	
November 29	at No. 8 Georgia Southern*	No. 10	Paulson Stadium; Statesboro, GA (NCAA Division I-AA First Round)	L 37–52	10,409	
*Non-conference game; Rankings from The Sports Network Poll released prior to the game
