= 1997 Chattanooga Mocs football team =

American college football season

1997 Chattanooga Mocs football
- Conference: Southern Conference
- Record: 7–4 (4–4 SoCon)
- Head coach: Buddy Green (4th season)
- Offensive coordinator: Frankie DeBusk (2nd season)
- Defensive coordinator: Rick Whitt (4th season)
- Captains: Keith Blanks; Tyrone Coleman; Ron Faugue; Brian Hampton
- Home stadium: Chamberlain Field; Finley Stadium

1997 Southern Conference football standings
	Conf.			Overall
Team	W		L	W		L
No. 8 Georgia Southern $^	7	–	1	10	–	3
No. 15 Appalachian State	6	–	2	7	–	4
East Tennessee State	5	–	3	7	–	4
Furman	5	–	3	7	–	4
The Citadel	4	–	4	6	–	5
Chattanooga	4	–	4	7	–	4
Western Carolina	3	–	5	3	–	8
Wofford	2	–	6	3	–	7
VMI	0	–	8	0	–	11
$ – Conference champion; ^ – NCAA Division I-AA playoff participant; Rankings from The Sports Network I-AA Poll

The 1997 Chattanooga Mocs football team represented the University of Tennessee at Chattanooga as a member of the Southern Conference (SoCon) in the 1997 NCAA Division I-AA football season. The Mocs were led by fourth-year head coach Buddy Green and played first three home games at Chamberlain Field before moving to newly-opened Finley Stadium on October 18. They finished the season 7–4 overall and 4–4 in SoCon play to tie for fifth place.

== Schedule ==
Date	Opponent	Rank	Site	Result	Attendance	Source
September 6	Tennessee Tech*		Chamberlain Field; Chattanooga, TN	W 13–10	8,377	
September 13	Middle Tennessee*		Chamberlain Field; Chattanooga, TN	W 33–24	8,298	
September 27	at No. 20 Georgia Southern	No. 22	Paulson Stadium; Statesboro, GA	L 10–37	10,128	
October 4	Wofford^{†}		Chamberlain Field; Chattanooga, TN	W 20–17	9,102	
October 11	at VMI		Alumni Memorial Field; Lexington, VA	W 27–24	6,745	
October 18	Tennessee State*		Finley Stadium; Chattanooga, TN	W 28–7	22,646	
October 25	Western Carolina		Finley Stadium; Chattanooga, TN	W 24–21	6,352	
November 1	at No. 18 Appalachian State	No. 23	Kidd Brewer Stadium; Boone, NC	L 7–41	16,761	
November 8	The Citadel		Finley Stadium; Chattanooga, TN	L 3–7	7,209	
November 15	at No. 19 East Tennessee State		Memorial Center; Johnson City, TN	W 17–13	6,181	
November 22	Furman		Finley Stadium; Chattanooga, TN	L 23–43	10,102	
*Non-conference game; ^{†}Homecoming; Rankings from The Sports Network Poll released prior to the game
