= 1997 South Carolina State Bulldogs football team =

American college football season

1997 South Carolina State Bulldogs football

Heritage Bowl, L 28–34 vs. Southern
- Conference: Mid-Eastern Athletic Conference

Ranking
- Sports Network: No. 22
- Record: 9–3 (5–2 MEAC)
- Head coach: Willie Jeffries (15th season)
- Home stadium: Oliver C. Dawson Stadium

1997 Mid-Eastern Athletic Conference football standings
	Conf.			Overall
Team	W		L	W		L
No. 9 Hampton $^	7	–	0	10	–	2
No. 22 South Carolina State	5	–	2	9	–	2
No. 10 Florida A&M ^	5	–	2	9	–	3
Howard	4	–	3	7	–	4
North Carolina A&T	3	–	4	7	–	4
Morgan State	2	–	5	3	–	7
Bethune–Cookman	1	–	6	4	–	7
Delaware State	1	–	6	3	–	8
Norfolk State	0	–	0	3	–	7
$ – Conference champion; ^ – NCAA Division I-AA playoff participant; Norfolk State games did not count as conference games.; Rankings from The Sports Network poll

The 1997 South Carolina State Bulldogs football team represented South Carolina State University as a member of the Mid-Eastern Athletic Conference (MEAC) during the 1997 NCAA Division I-AA football season. Led by 15th-year head coach Willie Jeffries, the Bulldogs compiled an overall record of 9–3, with a mark of 5–2 in conference play, and finished tied for second in the MEAC. In the postseason, the Bulldogs lost to Southern in the Heritage Bowl.

== Schedule ==
Date	Opponent	Rank	Site	Result	Attendance	Source
September 6	Charleston Southern*		Oliver C. Dawson Stadium; Orangeburg, SC	W 13–12	13,626	
September 13	No. 10 Furman*		Oliver C. Dawson Stadium; Orangeburg, SC	W 17–6	6,626	
September 27	vs. Tennessee State*		Georgia Dome; Atlanta, GA (Atlanta Football Classic)	W 34–28	41,292	
October 4	at Morgan State		Hughes Stadium; Baltimore, MD	W 34–27 ^{OT}	3,750	
October 11	Norfolk State*^{†}		Oliver C. Dawson Stadium; Orangeburg, SC	W 28–25	22,789	
October 18	at Bethune–Cookman	No. 23	Municipal Stadium; Daytona Beach, FL	W 17–10	11,212	
October 25	at No. 15 Hampton	No. 18	Armstrong Stadium; Hampton, VA	L 14–20	5,979	
November 1	Delaware State	No. 22	Oliver C. Dawson Stadium; Orangeburg, SC	W 37–17	4,366	
November 8	at Howard	No. 19	William H. Greene Stadium; Washington, DC	W 27–18	6,397	
November 15	No. 10 Florida A&M	No. 17	Oliver C. Dawson Stadium; Orangeburg, SC	L 20–22	12,784	
November 22	vs. North Carolina A&T	No. 22	Ericsson Stadium; Charlotte, NC (Carolinas Classic, rivalry)	W 33–18	22,642	
December 27	vs. No. 12 Southern*	No. 22	Georgia Dome; Atlanta, GA (Heritage Bowl)	L 28–34	32,629	
*Non-conference game; ^{†}Homecoming; Rankings from The Sports Network Poll released prior to the game
