= 1997 Boston University Terriers football team =

American college football season

1997 Boston University Terriers football
- Conference: Atlantic 10 Conference
- New England Division
- Record: 1–10 (1–7 A-10)
- Head coach: Tom Masella (2nd season)
- Home stadium: Nickerson Field

1997 Atlantic 10 Conference football standings
	Conf.			Overall
Team	W		L	W		L
New England Division
New Hampshire x	5	–	3	5	–	6
Connecticut	4	–	4	7	–	4
Maine	4	–	4	5	–	6
Rhode Island	2	–	6	2	–	9
Boston University	1	–	7	1	–	10
UMass	1	–	7	2	–	9
Mid-Atlantic Division
No. 1 Villanova x$^	8	–	0	12	–	1
No. 3 Delaware ^	7	–	1	12	–	2
No. 20 Northeastern	5	–	3	8	–	3
Richmond	4	–	4	6	–	5
William & Mary	4	–	4	7	–	4
James Madison	3	–	5	5	–	6
$ – Conference champion; x – Division champion/co-champions; ^ – NCAA Division I-AA playoff participant; Rankings from The Sports Network poll

The 1997 Boston University Terriers football team was an American football team that represented Boston University as a member of the Atlantic 10 Conference during the 1997 NCAA Division I-AA football season. In their second season under head coach Tom Masella, the Terriers compiled a 1–10 record (1–7 against conference opponents), tied for last place in the Atlantic 10's New England Division, and were outscored by a total of 353 to 162.

In late October 1997, Boston University announced that its trustees had voted to drop its football program at the end of the 1997 season. The move was announced as part of a restructuring plan that called for increased funding of women's sports.

== Schedule ==
Date	Opponent	Site	Result	Attendance	Source
September 6	at Hofstra	James M. Shuart Stadium; Hempstead, NY	L 14–24		
September 20	No. 5 Youngstown State	Nickerson Field; Boston, MA	L 7–28	2,035	
September 27	at No. 9 William & Mary	Zable Stadium; Williamsburg, VA	L 17–20	8,574	
October 4	No. 11 Delaware	Nickerson Field; Boston, MA	L 17–49		
October 11	Rhode Island	Nickerson Field; Boston, MA	L 17–20	1,281	
October 18	at Maine	Alumni Stadium; Orono, ME	L 29–62		
October 25	Northeastern	Nickerson Field; Boston, MA	L 7–28		
November 1	at Connecticut	Memorial Stadium; Storrs, CT	L 7–45		
November 8	UMass	Nickerson Field; Boston, MA	W 33–8	3,140	
November 15	at New Hampshire	Cowell Stadium; Durham, NH	L 0–38		
November 22	at James Madison	Bridgeforth Stadium; Harrisonburg, VA	L 14–31	4,200	
Rankings from The Sports Network Poll released prior to the game
