= 1997 Appalachian State Mountaineers football team =

American college football season

1997 Appalachian State Mountaineers football
- Conference: Southern Conference

Ranking
- Sports Network: No. 22
- Record: 7–4 (6–2 SoCon)
- Head coach: Jerry Moore (9th season)
- Home stadium: Kidd Brewer Stadium

1997 Southern Conference football standings
	Conf.			Overall
Team	W		L	W		L
No. 8 Georgia Southern $^	7	–	1	10	–	3
No. 15 Appalachian State	6	–	2	7	–	4
East Tennessee State	5	–	3	7	–	4
Furman	5	–	3	7	–	4
The Citadel	4	–	4	6	–	5
Chattanooga	4	–	4	7	–	4
Western Carolina	3	–	5	3	–	8
Wofford	2	–	6	3	–	7
VMI	0	–	8	0	–	11
$ – Conference champion; ^ – NCAA Division I-AA playoff participant; Rankings from The Sports Network poll

The 1997 Appalachian State Mountaineers football team was an American football team that represented Appalachian State University as a member of the Southern Conference (SoCon) during the 1997 NCAA Division I-AA football season. In their ninth year under head coach Jerry Moore, the Mountaineers compiled an overall record of 7–4, with a conference mark of 6–2.

== Schedule ==
Date	Opponent	Rank	Site	Result	Attendance	Source
September 6	at No. 18 (I-A) Clemson*	No. 11	Memorial Stadium; Clemson, SC	L 12–23	62,405	
September 20	Eastern Kentucky*	No. 9	Kidd Brewer Stadium; Boone, NC	W 27–23	11,602	
September 27	at The Citadel	No. 6	Johnson Hagood Stadium; Charleston, SC	W 40–15	6,093	
October 4	No. 14 East Tennessee State	No. 6	Kidd Brewer Stadium; Boone, NC	L 28–51	12,631	
October 11	at Furman	No. 14	Paladin Stadium; Greenville, SC	L 22–24	9,686	
October 18	No. 9 Georgia Southern		Kidd Brewer Stadium; Boone, NC (rivalry)	W 24–12	13,887	
October 25	at Wofford	No. 22	Gibbs Stadium; Spartanburg, SC	W 26–21	8,155	
November 1	No. 23 Chattanooga	No. 18	Kidd Brewer Stadium; Boone, NC	W 41–7	16,761	
November 8	at VMI	No. 17	Alumni Memorial Field; Lexington, VA	W 42–7	4,298	
November 15	Western Carolina	No. 15	Kidd Brewer Stadium; Boone, NC (rivalry)	W 13–7	9,989	
November 22	No. 25 Liberty*	No. 15	Kidd Brewer Stadium; Boone, NC	L 19–25	8,712	
*Non-conference game; Rankings from The Sports Network Poll released prior to the game
