= 1997 Hampton Pirates football team =

American college football season

1997 Hampton Pirates football

Black college national champion MEAC champion

NCAA Division I-AA First Round, L 13–28 vs. Youngstown State
- Conference: Mid-Eastern Athletic Conference

Ranking
- Sports Network: No. 9
- Record: 10–2 (7–0 MEAC)
- Head coach: Joe Taylor (6th season)
- Offensive coordinator: Donald Hill-Eley (1st season)
- Defensive coordinator: Alonzo Lee (1st season)
- Home stadium: Armstrong Stadium

1997 Mid-Eastern Athletic Conference football standings
	Conf.			Overall
Team	W		L	W		L
No. 9 Hampton $^	7	–	0	10	–	2
No. 22 South Carolina State	5	–	2	9	–	2
No. 10 Florida A&M ^	5	–	2	9	–	3
Howard	4	–	3	7	–	4
North Carolina A&T	3	–	4	7	–	4
Morgan State	2	–	5	3	–	7
Bethune–Cookman	1	–	6	4	–	7
Delaware State	1	–	6	3	–	8
Norfolk State	0	–	0	3	–	7
$ – Conference champion; ^ – NCAA Division I-AA playoff participant; Norfolk State games did not count as conference games.; Rankings from The Sports Network poll

The 1997 Hampton Pirates football team represented Hampton University as a member of the Mid-Eastern Athletic Conference (MEAC) during the 1997 NCAA Division I-AA football season. Led by sixth-year head coach Joe Taylor, the Pirates compiled an overall record of 10–2, with a mark of 7–0 in conference play, and finished as MEAC champion. Hampton finished their season with a loss against Youngstown State in the Division I-AA playoffs. At the conclusion of the season, the Pirates were also recognized as black college national champion.

== Schedule ==
Date	Opponent	Rank	Site	Result	Attendance	Source
August 30	at No. 4 William & Mary*		Zable Stadium; Williamsburg, VA	L 6–31	10,667	
September 13	at Howard		RFK Stadium; Washington, DC (Greater Washington Urban League Football Classic, rivalry)	W 49–21	11,711	
September 20	at North Carolina A&T		Aggie Stadium; Greensboro, NC	W 7–2	15,278	
September 27	vs. Grambling State*		Giants Stadium; East Rutherford, NJ (Urban League Classic)	W 42–7	49,156	
October 4	No. 12 Florida A&M		Armstrong Stadium; Hampton, VA	W 18–15	12,207	
October 11	at Liberty*	No. 25	Williams Stadium; Lynchburg, VA	W 33–27 ^{OT}	12,431	
October 18	at Norfolk State	No. 19	William "Dick" Price Stadium; Norfolk, VA (rivalry)	W 9–2	6,521	
October 25	No. 18 South Carolina State	No. 15	Armstrong Stadium; Hampton, VA	W 20–14	5,979	
November 8	at Bethune–Cookman	No. 12	Daytona Stadium; Daytona Beach, FL	W 27–0	3,500	
November 15	Delaware State^{†}	No. 9	Armstrong Stadium; Hampton, VA	W 24–20	14,311	
November 22	Morgan State	No. 9	Armstrong Stadium; Hampton, VA	W 10–0	4,015	
November 29	at No. 4 Youngstown State*	No. 9	Stambaugh Stadium; Youngstown, OH (NCAA Division I-AA First Round)	L 13–28	12,431	
*Non-conference game; ^{†}Homecoming; Rankings from The Sports Network Poll released prior to the game
