= Alvin Wyatt =

American football player and sports coach (born 1947)

No. 41
- Position: Defensive back

Personal information
- Born: December 13, 1947 (age 78); Jacksonville, Florida, U.S.
- Listed height: 5 ft 10 in (1.78 m)
- Listed weight: 184 lb (83 kg)

Career information
- High school: Matthew W. Gilbert (FL)
- College: Bethune–Cookman
- NFL draft: 1970: 6th round, 154th overall pick

Career history

Playing
- Oakland Raiders (1970); Buffalo Bills (1971–1972); Houston Oilers (1973); Jacksonville Sharks (1974)

Coaching
- Bethune–Cookman (1976–1996) (assistant); Bethune–Cookman (1997–2009) (head coach); Edward Waters (2013–2017) (head coach)

Awards and highlights
- MEAC Coach of the Year (1998)

Career NFL statistics
- Interceptions: 5
- INT yards: 82
- Touchdowns: 3
- Stats at Pro Football Reference

Alvin B. Wyatt (born December 13, 1947) is an American former football player and coach. He played professionally as a defensive back in the National Football League (NFL) with the Oakland Raiders, Buffalo Bills, and Houston Oilers and in World Football League (WFL) with the Jacksonville Sharks. Wyatt served as the head football coach at his alma mater, Bethune–Cookman University from 1997 to 2009 and Edward Waters College from 2013 to 2017, compiling a career college football coaching record of 100–92. He was also the women's basketball head coach at Bethune–Cookman from 1978 to 1996, tallying a mark of 245–201.

== Playing career ==
Wyatt played college football at Bethune–Cookman University and was selected by the Oakland Raiders in the sixth round of the 1970 NFL draft. Wyatt (who also returned kick-offs and punts, including a 63-yard punt return for a TD in his first NFL game—Oakland’s 1970 31-21 opening game loss to Cincinnati) spent only one year in Oakland; in 1971 and 1972 he played for the Buffalo Bills (with five interceptions and a touchdown), then moved to the Houston Oilers in 1973. After playing only sparingly (four games) for the Oilers, Wyatt jumped to the Jacksonville Sharks of the World Football League (WFL) in 1974. He quickly emerged as one of the Sharks' best players, returning a punt for a touchdown on national TV against the New York Stars (the first touchdown in Jacksonville pro football history), and leading the team with five interceptions. Unfortunately, the Sharks stopped paying their players, then folded in mid-season; Wyatt then decided to retire as a player.

== Coaching ==
Wyatt was responsible for turning around his alma mater's football program starting in 1997, when he took over as head coach. The program previously suffered 12 consecutive losing seasons during the 1980s and 1990s. Wyatt's success was due in part to his colorful and outspoken personality, and his flashy attire as he patrolled the sidelines. But major credit is due to his development and installation of his 'Wyattbone' offense (a version of the option offense), which enabled the team to be a potent rushing powerhouse, while their passing offense was efficient. As coach who came from a defensive background, Wyatt's defenses during the 2000s were ranked near the top of the Mid-Eastern Athletic Conference (MEAC). In 2002, Wyatt lead Bethune–Cookman to its first outright MEAC title, and a share of the conference title in 2003. Under Wyatt, Bethune–Cookman defeated longtime rival Florida A&M University in the annual Florida Classic in 2002, 2003, 2004, and 2007, a series which was previously dominated by the Florida A&M Rattlers. The Wildcats played in the NCAA Division I-AA playoffs in 2002 and 2003 under Wyatt, who is the winningest coach in the history of its football program. He compiled a record of 90–54.

Wyatt was an inspiration in the lives of many former Wildcat players, including current National Football League players Rashean Mathis (Jacksonville Jaguars), Nick Collins (Green Bay Packers), and Eric Weems (Atlanta Falcons). Mathis and Collins are the highest NFL draft picks to have ever come out of Bethune–Cookman. All three players have been selected to the NFL Pro Bowl. Mathis, Collins, and Weems were All-MEAC selections as well as being nominated to Div 1-AA All-American Teams and SBN Sports Black College All-American (BCAA) teams during their college careers. Other players under Wyatt who played in the NFL are Damion Cook (offensive lineman), and Steve Baggs (linebacker) who is in the Canadian Football League.

On December 10, 2013, Wyatt was named as the 13th head football coach in the history of Edward Waters College.

== Head coaching record ==
=== Football ===
Year	Team	Overall	Conference	Standing	Bowl/playoffs	TSN^{#}
Bethune–Cookman Wildcats (Mid-Eastern Athletic Conference) (1997–2009)
1997	Bethune–Cookman	4–7	1–6	T–7th		
1998	Bethune–Cookman	8–3	6–2	3rd	L Heritage	18
1999	Bethune–Cookman	7–4	4–4	T–4th		
2000	Bethune–Cookman	9–2	6–2	T–2nd		20
2001	Bethune–Cookman	6–4	5–3	T–3rd		
2002	Bethune–Cookman	11–2	7–1	1st	L NCAA Division I-AA First Round	15
2003	Bethune–Cookman	9–3	6–2	2nd	L NCAA Division I-AA First Round	15
2004	Bethune–Cookman	6–4	4–3	T–3rd		
2005	Bethune–Cookman	7–4	4–4	5th		
2006	Bethune–Cookman	5–6	3–5	7th		
2007	Bethune–Cookman	5–6	3–6	T–7th		
2008	Bethune–Cookman	8–3	5–3	T–2nd		
2009	Bethune–Cookman	5–6	4–4	T–4th		
Bethune–Cookman:		90–54	58–45			
Edward Waters Tigers (Sun Conference) (2013–2016)
2013	Edward Waters	1–9	0–3			
2014	Edward Waters	4–6	2–3	5th		
2015	Edward Waters	2–7	1–4	T–5th		
2016	Edward Waters	2–6	1–3	5th		
Edward Waters Tigers (Mid-South Conference) (2017)
2017	Edward Waters	1–10	0–5	6th (Sun)		
Edward Waters:		10–38	4–18			
Total:		100–92				
National championship Conference title Conference division title or championship game berth
