= 1997 Eastern Kentucky Colonels football team =

American college football season

1997 Eastern Kentucky Colonels football

OVC champion

NCAA Division I-AA First Round, L 14–42 vs. Western Kentucky
- Conference: Ohio Valley Conference

Ranking
- Sports Network: No. 13
- Record: 8–4 (7–0 OVC)
- Head coach: Roy Kidd (34th season)
- Home stadium: Roy Kidd Stadium

1997 Ohio Valley Conference football standings
	Conf.			Overall
Team	W		L	W		L
No. 19 Eastern Kentucky $^	7	–	0	8	–	4
No. 16 Eastern Illinois	5	–	2	8	–	3
Murray State	5	–	2	7	–	4
Tennessee Tech	4	–	3	6	–	5
Tennessee State	4	–	3	4	–	7
Middle Tennessee	2	–	5	4	–	6
Southeast Missouri State	1	–	6	4	–	7
Tennessee–Martin	0	–	7	1	–	10
$ – Conference champion; ^ – NCAA Division I-AA playoff participant; Rankings from The Sports Network poll

The 1997 Eastern Kentucky Colonels football team represented Eastern Kentucky University in the 1997 NCAA Division I-AA football season. The team was led by 34th-year head coach Roy Kidd and played their home games at Roy Kidd Stadium in Richmond, Kentucky. The Colonels finished the season with an 8–4 overall record and an undefeated 7–0 record in Ohio Valley Conference games, making them conference champions. They qualified for the Division I-AA playoffs, where they lost in the first round to Western Kentucky.

== Schedule ==
Date	Opponent	Rank	Site	Result	Attendance	Source
September 6	at No. 2 Troy State*	No. 21	Veterans Memorial Stadium; Troy, AL	L 12–21		
September 13	No. 9 Western Kentucky*	No. 22	Roy Kidd Stadium; Richmond, KY (Battle for the Bluegrass)	L 21–37	18,600	
September 20	at No. 9 Appalachian State*		Kidd Brewer Stadium; Boone, NC	L 23–27	11,602	
September 27	Austin Peay*		Roy Kidd Stadium; Richmond, KY	W 56–3	9,200	
October 11	at Tennessee State		Hale Stadium; Nashville, TN	W 49–7	6,124	
October 18	at Murray State		Roy Stewart Stadium; Murray, KY	W 29–8	6,136	
October 25	Tennessee Tech^{†}		Roy Kidd Stadium; Richmond, KY	W 26–7	12,400	
November 1	Tennessee–Martin		Roy Kidd Stadium; Richmond, KY	W 49–0	5,200	
November 8	at Southeast Missouri State	No. 24	Houck Stadium; Cape Girardeau, MO	W 20–10	3,253	
November 15	Middle Tennessee	No. 23	Roy Kidd Stadium; Richmond, KY	W 35–20	6,400	
November 22	at No. 16 Eastern Illinois	No. 19	O'Brien Stadium; Charleston, IL	W 49–7	2,120	
November 29	at No. 5 Western Kentucky*	No. 15	L. T. Smith Stadium; Bowling Green, KY (NCAA Division I-AA First Round)	L 14–42	9,000	
*Non-conference game; ^{†}Homecoming; Rankings from The Sports Network Poll released prior to the game
