= 1997 Alabama A&M Bulldogs football team =

College football season

1997 Alabama A&M Bulldogs football
- Conference: Southern Intercollegiate Athletic Conference
- Record: 7–4 (4–2 SIAC)
- Head coach: Kenneth Pettiford (3rd season)
- Home stadium: Louis Crews Stadium

1997 Southern Intercollegiate Athletic Conference football standings
	Conf.			Overall
Team	W		L	W		L
No. 5 Albany State $^	6	–	0	11	–	1
Alabama A&M	4	–	2	7	–	4
Kentucky State	4	–	2	7	–	5
Fort Valley State	4	–	2	5	–	6
Tuskegee	3	–	3	7	–	4
Morris Brown	3	–	3	6	–	5
Miles	3	–	3	4	–	6
Clark Atlanta	2	–	4	4	–	7
Savannah State	1	–	5	3	–	8
Morehouse	0	–	6	3	–	8
$ – Conference champion; ^ – NCAA Division II playoff participant; Rankings from NCAA Division II Football Committee poll

The 1997 Alabama A&M Bulldogs football team represented Alabama A&M University as a member of the Southern Intercollegiate Athletic Conference (SIAC) during the 1997 NCAA Division II football season. Led by third-year head coach Kenneth Pettiford, the Bulldogs compiled an overall record of 7–4 with a mark of 4–2 in conference play, and finished tied for second place in the SIAC.

== Schedule ==
Date	Opponent	Site	Result	Attendance	Source
September 6	North Alabama*	Louis Crews Stadium; Normal, AL	L 20–49	19,497	
September 13	at Clark Atlanta	Panther Stadium; Atlanta, GA	W 9–7	7,320	
September 20	at Mississippi Valley State*	Magnolia Stadium; Itta Bena, MS	W 23–8		
September 27	Morris Brown	Louis Crews Stadium; Normal, AL	W 10–6	5,090	
October 4	Morehouse^{†}	Louis Crews Stadium; Normal, AL	W 38–14		
October 11	at No. 7 Albany State	Hugh Mills Stadium; Albany, GA	L 13–25		
October 18	Fort Valley State	Louis Crews Stadium; Normal, AL	W 38–14	3,000	
October 25	vs. Alabama State*	Legion Field; Birmingham, AL (Magic City Classic)	L 13–20		
November 1	at Miles	Alumni Stadium; Fairfield, AL	W 31–26		
November 8	Tuskegee	Louis Crews Stadium; Normal, AL	W 26–15		
November 15	at Kentucky State	Alumni Field; Frankfort, KY	L 20–27		
*Non-conference game; ^{†}Homecoming; Rankings from NCAA Division II Football Committee Poll released prior to the game; Source:
