= 1997 Rhode Island Rams football team =

American college football season

1997 Rhode Island Rams football
- Conference: Atlantic 10 Conference
- New England Division
- Record: 2–9 (2–6 A-10)
- Head coach: Floyd Keith (5th season)
- Defensive coordinator: Joe Bottiglieri (2nd season)
- Home stadium: Meade Stadium

1997 Atlantic 10 Conference football standings
| | Conf. | | | Overall |
| Team | W | | L | W | | L |
|---|---|---|---|---|---|---|
New England Division
| New Hampshire x | 5 | – | 3 | 5 | – | 6 |
| Connecticut | 4 | – | 4 | 7 | – | 4 |
| Maine | 4 | – | 4 | 5 | – | 6 |
| Rhode Island | 2 | – | 6 | 2 | – | 9 |
| Boston University | 1 | – | 7 | 1 | – | 10 |
| UMass | 1 | – | 7 | 2 | – | 9 |
Mid-Atlantic Division
| No. 1 Villanova x$^ | 8 | – | 0 | 12 | – | 1 |
| No. 3 Delaware ^ | 7 | – | 1 | 12 | – | 2 |
| No. 20 Northeastern | 5 | – | 3 | 8 | – | 3 |
| Richmond | 4 | – | 4 | 6 | – | 5 |
| William & Mary | 4 | – | 4 | 7 | – | 4 |
| James Madison | 3 | – | 5 | 5 | – | 6 |
$ – Conference champion; x – Division champion/co-champions; ^ – NCAA Division I-AA playoff participant; Rankings from The Sports Network poll

The 1997 Rhode Island Rams football team was an American football team that represented the University of Rhode Island in the Atlantic 10 Conference during the 1997 NCAA Division I-AA football season. In their fifth season under head coach Floyd Keith, the Rams compiled a 2–9 record (2–6 against conference opponents) and finished fourth in the New England Division of the conference.

== Schedule ==
| Date | Opponent | Site | Result | Attendance | Source |
|---|---|---|---|---|---|
| September 6 | Maine | Meade Stadium; Kingston, RI | L 14–30 | 4,670 | |
| September 13 | New Hampshire | Meade Stadium; Kingston, RI | W 35–21 | 2,680 | |
| September 20 | Northeastern | Meade Stadium; Kingston, RI | L 13–41 | 2,639 | |
| September 27 | at UMass | McGuirk Stadium; Hadley, MA | L 14–18 | 8,218 | |
| October 4 | Hofstra^{†}* | Meade Stadium; Kingston, RI | W 20–17 | 5,178 | |
| October 11 | at Boston University | Nickerson Field; Boston, MA | W 20–17 | 1,281 | |
| October 18 | at Brown* | Brown Stadium; Providence, RI (rivalry) | L 15–23 | 4,922 | |
| October 25 | at Connecticut | Memorial Stadium; Storrs, CT (rivalry) | L 21–37 | 5,139 | |
| November 1 | No. 1 Villanova | Meade Stadium; Kingston, RI | L 15–37 | 2,297 | |
| November 8 | at Richmond | UR Stadium; Richmond, VA | L 11–27 | 5,918 | |
| November 15 | at James Madison | Bridgeforth Stadium; Harrisonburg, VA | L 37–39 ^{3OT} | 6,800 | |
*Non-conference game; ^{†}Homecoming; Rankings from The Sports Network Poll released prior to the game
