= 1997 Southern Jaguars football team =

American college football season

1997 Southern Jaguars football

Black college national champion SWAC champion

Heritage Bowl, W 34–28 vs. South Carolina State
- Conference: Southwestern Athletic Conference

Ranking
- Sports Network: No. 12
- Record: 11–1 (8–0 SWAC)
- Head coach: Pete Richardson (5th season)
- Home stadium: A. W. Mumford Stadium

1997 Southwestern Athletic Conference football standings
	Conf.			Overall
Team	W		L	W		L
No. 12 Southern $	8	–	0	11	–	1
No. 14 Jackson State ^	7	–	1	9	–	3
Arkansas–Pine Bluff	6	–	2	8	–	3
Texas Southern	4	–	4	5	–	6
Alcorn State	4	–	4	4	–	7
Mississippi Valley State	3	–	5	4	–	6
Alabama State	2	–	6	3	–	8
Grambling State	2	–	6	3	–	8
Prairie View A&M	0	–	8	0	–	9
$ – Conference champion; ^ – NCAA Division I-AA playoff participant; Rankings from The Sports Network Poll

The 1997 Southern Jaguars football team represented Southern University as a member of the Southwestern Athletic Conference (SWAC) during the 1997 NCAA Division I-AA football season. Led by fifth-year head coach Pete Richardson, the Jaguars compiled an overall record of 11–1, with a conference record of 8–0, and finished as SWAC champion. At the conclusion of the season, the Jaguars were also recognized as black college national champion.

== Schedule ==
Date	Opponent	Rank	Site	Result	Attendance	Source
August 30	vs. Mississippi Valley State	No. 17	Soldier Field; Chicago, IL (Chicago Football Classic)	W 57–30	22,061	
September 6	Northwestern State*	No. 17	A. W. Mumford Stadium; Baton Rouge, LA	W 27–9		
September 13	Arkansas–Pine Bluff	No. 15	A. W. Mumford Stadium; Baton Rouge, LA	W 36–33 ^{3OT}		
September 20	Prairie View A&M	No. 13	A. W. Mumford Stadium; Baton Rouge, LA	W 63–7		
October 4	vs. Alabama State	No. 13	Ladd Stadium; Mobile, AL (Gulf Coast Classic)	W 27–16	29,331	
October 18	at Jackson State	No. 8	Mississippi Veterans Memorial Stadium; Jackson, MS (rivalry)	W 28–8	60,319	
October 25	Alcorn State	No. 8	A. W. Mumford Stadium; Baton Rouge, LA	W 25–16		
November 1	Nicholls State*	No. 6	A. W. Mumford Stadium; Baton Rouge, LA	W 21–14	24,000	
November 8	at No. 15 Florida A&M*	No. 6	Bragg Memorial Stadium; Tallahassee, FL	L 3–33	33,441	
November 16	at Texas Southern	No. 12	Rice Stadium; Houston, TX	W 27–17		
November 29	vs. Grambling State	No. 12	Louisiana Superdome; New Orleans, LA (Bayou Classic)	W 30–7		
December 27	vs. No. 22 South Carolina State*	No. 12	Georgia Dome; Atlanta, GA (Heritage Bowl)	W 34–28	32,629	
*Non-conference game; Rankings from The Sports Network Poll released prior to the game
