= John McKenzie (American football) =

American football quarterback and coach

Current position
- Title: Head coach
- Team: Bryant HS (AL)
- Record: 0–0

Biographical details
- Born: c. 1963 (age 62–63)

Playing career
- 1982–1984: Jackson State
- Position: Quarterback

Coaching career (HC unless noted)
- 1985: Jackson State (QB)
- 1986: Miami Central (FL) (OC)
- 1987–1989: Alabama State (QB/WR)
- 1990–1991: Alabama State (OC)
- 1992–1993: Jackson State (OC)
- 1994: Alabama State (QB)
- 1996: Fayetteville State (OC)
- 1997–1999: Delaware State
- 2000–2007: Alcorn State (OC)
- 2008: North Carolina A&T (OC)
- 2009–2013: Alabama A&M (QB/WR)
- 2018–2019: Kemper County HS (MS)
- 2020–2021: Vigor HS (AL)
- 2022: Murphy HS (AL)
- 2023–present: Bryant HS (AL)

Head coaching record
- Overall: 7–26 (college)

John McKenzie (born c. 1963) is an American former football player and coach. He is the head football coach at Paul W. Bryant High School in Tuscaloosa, Alabama, a position he has held since 2023. He served as the head football coach at Delaware State University from 1997 to 1999, compiling a record of 7–26. A native of Miami, Florida, McKenzie played college football as a quarterback at Jackson State University.

== Head coaching record ==
=== College ===
Year	Team	Overall	Conference	Standing	Bowl/playoffs
Delaware State Hornets (Mid-Eastern Athletic Conference) (1997–1999)
1997	Delaware State	3–8	1–6	T–7th	
1998	Delaware State	0–11	0–8	9th	
1999	Delaware State	4–7	4–4	T–4th	
Delaware State:		7–26	5–18		
Total:		7–26			
