= 1997 East Tennessee State Buccaneers football team =

American college football season

1997 East Tennessee State Buccaneers football
- Conference: Southern Conference
- Record: 7–4 (5–3 SoCon)
- Head coach: Paul Hamilton (1st season)
- Home stadium: Memorial Center

1997 Southern Conference football standings
	Conf.			Overall
Team	W		L	W		L
No. 8 Georgia Southern $^	7	–	1	10	–	3
No. 15 Appalachian State	6	–	2	7	–	4
East Tennessee State	5	–	3	7	–	4
Furman	5	–	3	7	–	4
The Citadel	4	–	4	6	–	5
Chattanooga	4	–	4	7	–	4
Western Carolina	3	–	5	3	–	8
Wofford	2	–	6	3	–	7
VMI	0	–	8	0	–	11
$ – Conference champion; ^ – NCAA Division I-AA playoff participant; Rankings from The Sports Network I-AA Poll

The 1997 East Tennessee State Buccaneers football team was an American football team that represented East Tennessee State University as a member of the Southern Conference (SoCon) during the 1997 NCAA Division I-AA football season. Led by first-year head coach Paul Hamilton, the Buccaneers compiled and overall record of 7–4, with a mark of 5–3 in conference play, and finished tied for third in the SoCon.

== Schedule ==
Date	Opponent	Rank	Site	Result	Attendance	Source
August 28	Charleston Southern*	No. 12	Memorial Center; Johnson City, TN	W 30–7	6,671	
September 6	Elon*	No. 7	Memorial Center; Johnson City, TN	W 35–16		
September 13	at James Madison*	No. 6	Bridgeforth Stadium; Harrisonburg, VA	L 27–32		
September 27	Western Carolina	No. 14	Memorial Center; Johnson City, TN	W 28–18		
October 4	at No. 6 Appalachian State	No. 14	Kidd Brewer Stadium; Boone, NC	W 51–28	12,631	
October 11	The Citadel	No. 8	Memorial Center; Johnson City, TN	L 20–23 ^{OT}	7,039	
October 25	at No. 19 Furman	No. 13	Paladin Stadium; Greenville, SC	W 58–28	9,105	
November 1	No. 14 Georgia Southern	No. 12	Memorial Center; Johnson City, TN	L 30–38	5,629	
November 8	at Wofford	No. 20	Gibbs Stadium; Spartanburg, SC	W 31–28		
November 15	Chattanooga	No. 19	Memorial Center; Johnson City, TN	L 13–17	6,181	
November 22	at VMI		Alumni Memorial Field; Lexington, VA	W 17–7	4,085	
*Non-conference game; Rankings from The Sports Network Poll released prior to the game
