= 1997 Connecticut Huskies football team =

American college football season

1997 Connecticut Huskies football
- Conference: Atlantic 10 Conference
- New England
- Record: 7–4 (4–4 A-10)
- Head coach: Skip Holtz (4th season)
- Offensive coordinator: Todd Fitch (2nd season)
- Defensive coordinator: Nick Rapone (3rd season)
- Home stadium: Memorial Stadium

1997 Atlantic 10 Conference football standings
	Conf.			Overall
Team	W		L	W		L
New England Division
New Hampshire x	5	–	3	5	–	6
Connecticut	4	–	4	7	–	4
Maine	4	–	4	5	–	6
Rhode Island	2	–	6	2	–	9
Boston University	1	–	7	1	–	10
UMass	1	–	7	2	–	9
Mid-Atlantic Division
No. 1 Villanova x$^	8	–	0	12	–	1
No. 3 Delaware ^	7	–	1	12	–	2
No. 20 Northeastern	5	–	3	8	–	3
Richmond	4	–	4	6	–	5
William & Mary	4	–	4	7	–	4
James Madison	3	–	5	5	–	6
$ – Conference champion; x – Division champion/co-champions; ^ – NCAA Division I-AA playoff participant; Rankings from The Sports Network poll

The 1997 Connecticut Huskies football team represented the University of Connecticut in the 1997 NCAA Division I-AA football season. The Huskies were led by fourth-year head coach Skip Holtz, and completed the season with a record of 7–4.

== Schedule ==
Date	Opponent	Rank	Site	Result	Attendance	Source
September 13	Northeastern		Memorial Stadium; Storrs, CT	W 38–26		
September 20	at Hofstra*		Hofstra Stadium; Hempstead, NY	W 35–31		
September 27	at Yale*		Yale Bowl; New Haven, CT	W 28–0	16,367	
October 4	Buffalo*		Memorial Stadium; Storrs, CT	W 55–0	13,725	
October 11	at Maine	No. 25	Alumni Field; Orono, ME	L 47–49		
October 18	No. 18 William & Mary		Memorial Stadium; Storrs, CT	L 17–38	8,396	
October 25	Rhode Island		Memorial Stadium; Storrs, CT (rivalry)	W 37–21	5,139	
November 1	Boston University		Memorial Stadium; Storrs, CT	W 45–7		
November 8	at No. 3 Delaware		Delaware Stadium; Newark, DE	L 29–37		
November 15	at UMass		Warren McGuirk Alumni Stadium; Amherst, MA (rivalry)	W 49–16	2,870	
November 22	New Hampshire		Memorial Stadium; Storrs, CT	L 18–21		
*Non-conference game; Rankings from The Sports Network Poll released prior to the game
