= 1997 New Hampshire Wildcats football team =

American college football season

1997 New Hampshire Wildcats football

A-10 New England Division champion
- Conference: Atlantic 10 Conference
- New England Division
- Record: 5–6 (5–3 A-10)
- Head coach: Bill Bowes (26th season)
- Offensive coordinator: Sean McDonnell (4th season)
- Home stadium: Cowell Stadium

1997 Atlantic 10 Conference football standings
	Conf.			Overall
Team	W		L	W		L
New England Division
New Hampshire x	5	–	3	5	–	6
Connecticut	4	–	4	7	–	4
Maine	4	–	4	5	–	6
Rhode Island	2	–	6	2	–	9
Boston University	1	–	7	1	–	10
UMass	1	–	7	2	–	9
Mid-Atlantic Division
No. 1 Villanova x$^	8	–	0	12	–	1
No. 3 Delaware ^	7	–	1	12	–	2
No. 20 Northeastern	5	–	3	8	–	3
Richmond	4	–	4	6	–	5
William & Mary	4	–	4	7	–	4
James Madison	3	–	5	5	–	6
$ – Conference champion; x – Division champion/co-champions; ^ – NCAA Division I-AA playoff participant; Rankings from The Sports Network poll

The 1997 New Hampshire Wildcats football team was an American football team that represented the University of New Hampshire as a member of New England Division of the Atlantic 10 Conference during the 1997 NCAA Division I-AA football season. In its 26th year under head coach Bill Bowes, the team compiled a 5–6 record (5–3 against conference opponents) and finished in first place in the New England Division.

== Schedule ==
Date	Opponent	Rank	Site	Result	Attendance	Source
September 6	No. 6 Delaware	No. 22	Cowell Stadium; Durham, NH	L 10–27		
September 13	at Rhode Island		Meade Stadium; Kingston, RI	L 21–35	2,680	
September 20	No. 3 William & Mary		Cowell Stadium; Durham, NH	W 24–22	3,274	
September 27	at No. 17 Stephen F. Austin*		Homer Bryce Stadium; Nacogdoches, TX	L 14–18		
October 4	at UMass		McGuirk Stadium; Hadley, MA (rivalry)	W 28–10	14,835	
October 11	Hofstra*		Cowell Stadium; Durham, NH	L 14–33		
October 18	at Northeastern*		Parsons Field; Brookline, MA	L 19–34		
October 25	Maine		Cowell Stadium; Durham, NH (Battle for the Brice–Cowell Musket)	W 24–7		
November 8	at No. 1 Villanova		Villanova Stadium; Villanova, PA	L 20–23		
November 15	Boston University		Cowell Stadium; Durham, NH	W 38–0		
November 22	at Connecticut		Memorial Stadium; Storrs, CT	W 21–18		
*Non-conference game; Rankings from The Sports Network Poll released prior to the game
