= 1997 Delaware Fightin' Blue Hens football team =

American college football season

1997 Delaware Fightin' Blue Hens football

Lambert Cup winner

NCAA Division I-AA Semifinal, L 21–23 vs. McNeese State
- Conference: Atlantic 10 Conference
- Mid-Atlantic Division

Ranking
- Sports Network: No. 3
- Record: 12–2 (7–1 A-10)
- Head coach: Tubby Raymond (32nd season)
- Offensive coordinator: Ted Kempski (30th season)
- Offensive scheme: Delaware Wing-T
- Defensive coordinator: Bob Sabol (7th season)
- Base defense: 4–3
- Home stadium: Delaware Stadium

1997 Atlantic 10 Conference football standings
	Conf.			Overall
Team	W		L	W		L
New England Division
New Hampshire x	5	–	3	5	–	6
Connecticut	4	–	4	7	–	4
Maine	4	–	4	5	–	6
Rhode Island	2	–	6	2	–	9
Boston University	1	–	7	1	–	10
UMass	1	–	7	2	–	9
Mid-Atlantic Division
No. 1 Villanova x$^	8	–	0	12	–	1
No. 3 Delaware ^	7	–	1	12	–	2
No. 20 Northeastern	5	–	3	8	–	3
Richmond	4	–	4	6	–	5
William & Mary	4	–	4	7	–	4
James Madison	3	–	5	5	–	6
$ – Conference champion; x – Division champion/co-champions; ^ – NCAA Division I-AA playoff participant; Rankings from The Sports Network poll

The 1997 Delaware Fightin' Blue Hens football team represented the University of Delaware as a member of the Mid-Atlantic Division of the Atlantic 10 Conference (A-10) during the 1997 NCAA Division I-AA football season. Led by 32nd-year head coach Tubby Raymond, the Fightin' Blue Hens compiled an overall record of 12–2 with a mark of 7–1 in conference play, placing second in the A-10's Mid-Atlantic Division. For the sixth time in seven sessions, Delaware advanced to the NCAA Division I-AA Football Championship playoffs, where the Fightin' Blue Hens beat Hofstra in the first round and Georgia Southern in the quarterfinals before losing to the eventual national runner-up, McNeese State, in the semifinals. The team played home games at Delaware Stadium in Newark, Delaware.

== Schedule ==
Date	Opponent	Rank	Site	Result	Attendance	Source
September 6	at No. 22 New Hampshire	No. 6	Cowell Stadium; Durham, NH	W 27–10		
September 13	No. 18 Villanova	No. 4	Delaware Stadium; Newark, DE (Battle of the Blue)	L 25–35		
September 20	West Chester*	No. 11	Delaware Stadium; Newark, DE (rivalry)	W 28–7		
September 27	at Northeastern	No. 10	Parsons Field; Brookline, MA	W 38–14		
October 4	at Boston University	No. 11	Nickerson Field; Boston, MA	W 49–17		
October 11	No. 21 Richmond	No. 6	Delaware Stadium; Newark, DE	W 24–7	14,324	
October 18	at James Madison	No. 6	Bridgeforth Stadium; Harrisonburg, VA (rivalry)	W 49–27	12,000	
October 25	at UMass*	No. 4	Warren McGuirk Alumni Stadium; Hadley, MA	W 40–9	5,317	
November 1	No. 20 William & Mary^{†}	No. 3	Delaware Stadium; Newark, DE (rivalry)	W 14–0	18,707	
November 8	Connecticut	No. 3	Delaware Stadium; Newark, DE	W 37–29		
November 15	at Lehigh*	No. 3	Goodman Stadium; Bethlehem, PA (rivalry)	W 24–19	7,122	
November 29	No. 17 Hofstra*	No. 3	Delaware Stadium; Newark, DE (NCAA Division I-AA First Round)	W 24–14		
December 6	No. 8 Georgia Southern*	No. 3	Delaware Stadium; Newark, DE (NCAA Division I-AA Quarterfinal)	W 16–7	11,203	
December 13	No. 7 McNeese State*	No. 3	Delaware Stadium; Newark, DE (NCAA Division I-AA Semifinal)	L 21–23	14,461	
*Non-conference game; ^{†}Homecoming; Rankings from The Sports Network Poll released prior to the game
