= 1997 Villanova Wildcats football team =

American college football season

1997 Villanova Wildcats football

A-10 champion

NCAA Division I-AA Quarterfinal, L 34–37 vs. Youngstown State
- Conference: Atlantic 10 Conference

Ranking
- Sports Network: No. 1
- Record: 12–1 (8–0 A-10)
- Head coach: Andy Talley (13th season)
- Offensive coordinator: Dave Clawson (2nd season)
- Offensive scheme: Multiple
- Defensive coordinator: Joe Trainer (1st season)
- Base defense: 4–3
- Captains: Josh Dolbin; Derek Forgione
- Home stadium: Villanova Stadium

1997 Atlantic 10 Conference football standings
	Conf.			Overall
Team	W		L	W		L
New England Division
New Hampshire x	5	–	3	5	–	6
Connecticut	4	–	4	7	–	4
Maine	4	–	4	5	–	6
Rhode Island	2	–	6	2	–	9
Boston University	1	–	7	1	–	10
UMass	1	–	7	2	–	9
Mid-Atlantic Division
No. 1 Villanova x$^	8	–	0	12	–	1
No. 3 Delaware ^	7	–	1	12	–	2
No. 20 Northeastern	5	–	3	8	–	3
Richmond	4	–	4	6	–	5
William & Mary	4	–	4	7	–	4
James Madison	3	–	5	5	–	6
$ – Conference champion; x – Division champion/co-champions; ^ – NCAA Division I-AA playoff participant; Rankings from The Sports Network poll

The 1997 Villanova Wildcats football team represented Villanova University during the 1997 NCAA Division I-AA football season. It was the program's 100th season and they finished as Atlantic 10 Conference (A-10) champions after posting a perfect 8–0 record in conference play. The Wildcats earned a berth as the #1 seed into the 16-team Division I-AA playoffs, but lost in the quarterfinals to eventual national champion Youngstown State, 34–37. Villanova was led by 13th-year head coach Andy Talley. Villanova finished the year ranked #1 in the nation according to The Sports Network's final poll, which was released prior to the playoffs starting.

Among the many postseason awards received, coach Talley was honored as the AFCA Coach of the Year and Eddie Robinson Award winner for being the Division I-AA national coach of the year. Senior wide receiver Brian Finneran received the Walter Payton Award, which is given to the nation's top offensive player.

== Schedule ==
Date	Time	Opponent	Rank	Site	TV	Result	Attendance	Source
August 28		No. 18 (D-II) West Chester*		Villanova Stadium; Villanova, PA		W 64–0		
September 13		at No. 6 Delaware	No. 19	Delaware Stadium; Newark, DE (rivalry)		W 35–25		
September 20		Maine	No. 10	Villanova Stadium; Villanova, PA		W 34–14		
October 4		No. 22 James Madison	No. 4	Villanova Stadium; Villanova, PA		W 49–17	7,631	
October 11	1:00 p.m.	UMass	No. 3	Villanova Stadium; Villanova, PA	NESN	W 49–27	7,109	
October 18		at Richmond	No. 3	UR Stadium; Richmond, VA		W 40–29	6,240	
October 25		at No. 14 William & Mary	No. 1	Zable Stadium; Williamsburg, VA		W 20–13	10,559	
November 1		at Rhode Island	No. 1	Meade Stadium; Kingston, RI		W 37–15		
November 8		New Hampshire	No. 1	Villanova Stadium; Villanova, PA		W 23–20		
November 15	1:00 p.m.	Buffalo*	No. 1	Villanova Stadium; Villanova, PA		W 42–28	6,831	
November 22		No. 20 Northeastern	No. 1	Villanova Stadium; Villanova, PA		W 49–35		
November 29		Colgate*	No. 1	Villanova Stadium; Villanova, PA (NCAA Division I-AA First Round)		W 49–28	8,875	
December 6	12:00 p.m.	No. 4 Youngstown State*	No. 1	Villanova Stadium; Villanova, PA (NCAA Division I-AA Quarterfinal)		L 34–37	7,591	
*Non-conference game; Rankings from The Sports Network Poll released prior to the game; All times are in Eastern time

== Roster ==
1997 Villanova Wildcats football team roster
Players
Coaches
Offense

Pos.	#	Name	Class
WR	29	Brad Finneran	Sr
WR	25	Brian Finneran	Sr

Defense

Pos.	#	Name	Class

Special teams

Pos.	#	Name	Class

Head coach

- Andy Talley

Coordinators/assistant coaches

Legend

- (C) Team captain
- (S) Suspended
- (I) Ineligible
- Injured
- Redshirt

Roster

== Awards and honors ==
- Walter Payton Award – Brian Finneran
- First Team All-America – Chris Boden (Walter Camp); Brian Finneran (Associated Press, The Sports Network, AFCA, Walter Camp)
- First Team All-Atlantic 10 – Chris Boden, Brian Finneran, Jason Tenner
- Second Team All-Atlantic 10 – George Freiberger, Mark Kiefer
- Third Team All-Atlantic 10 – Josh Dolbin, Ryan Knight, Shaun Lyons, Chris Machovina, Mitch McCrimmon, Shannon Riley
- AFCA Coach of the Year Award – Andy Talley
- Eddie Robinson Award – Andy Talley
- Atlantic 10 Coach of the Year – Andy Talley
