= 1997 James Madison Dukes football team =

American college football season

1997 James Madison Dukes football
- Conference: Atlantic 10 Conference
- Mid-Atlantic Division
- Record: 5–6 (3–5 A-10)
- Head coach: Alex Wood (3rd season)
- Home stadium: Bridgeforth Stadium

1997 Atlantic 10 Conference football standings
	Conf.			Overall
Team	W		L	W		L
New England Division
New Hampshire x	5	–	3	5	–	6
Connecticut	4	–	4	7	–	4
Maine	4	–	4	5	–	6
Rhode Island	2	–	6	2	–	9
Boston University	1	–	7	1	–	10
UMass	1	–	7	2	–	9
Mid-Atlantic Division
No. 1 Villanova x$^	8	–	0	12	–	1
No. 3 Delaware ^	7	–	1	12	–	2
No. 20 Northeastern	5	–	3	8	–	3
Richmond	4	–	4	6	–	5
William & Mary	4	–	4	7	–	4
James Madison	3	–	5	5	–	6
$ – Conference champion; x – Division champion/co-champions; ^ – NCAA Division I-AA playoff participant; Rankings from The Sports Network poll

The 1997 James Madison Dukes football team was an American football team that represented James Madison University during the 1997 NCAA Division I-AA football season as a member of the Atlantic 10 Conference. In their third year under head coach Alex Wood, the team compiled a 5–6 record.

== Schedule ==
Date	Opponent	Rank	Site	Result	Attendance	Source
September 6	at Ball State*		Ball State Stadium; Muncie, IN	L 6–24	16,647	
September 13	No. 6 East Tennessee State*		Bridgeforth Stadium; Harrisonburg, VA	W 32–27		
September 20	UMass		Bridgeforth Stadium; Harrisonburg, VA	W 13–10	11,300	
September 27	at Maine	No. 25	Alumni Field; Orono, ME	W 24–22	5,220	
October 4	at No. 4 Villanova	No. 22	Villanova Stadium; Villanova, PA	L 17–49	7,631	
October 11	at No. 23 William & Mary		Zable Stadium; Williamsburg, VA (rivalry)	L 25–38	8,529	
October 18	No. 6 Delaware		Bridgeforth Stadium; Harrisonburg, VA (rivalry)	L 27–49	12,000	
October 25	Richmond		Bridgeforth Stadium; Harrisonburg, VA (rivalry)	L 21–26		
November 8	at No. 25 Northeastern		Parsons Field; Brookline, MA	L 17–41	1,017	
November 15	Rhode Island		Bridgeforth Stadium; Harrisonburg, VA	W 39–37 ^{3OT}	6,800	
November 22	Boston University		Bridgeforth Stadium; Harrisonburg, VA	W 31–14	4,200	
*Non-conference game; Rankings from The Sports Network Poll released prior to the game
