= 1997 Richmond Spiders football team =

American college football season

1997 Richmond Spiders football
- Conference: Atlantic 10 Conference
- Record: 6–5 (4–4 A-10)
- Head coach: Jim Reid (3rd season)
- Home stadium: UR Stadium

1997 Atlantic 10 Conference football standings
	Conf.			Overall
Team	W		L	W		L
New England Division
New Hampshire x	5	–	3	5	–	6
Connecticut	4	–	4	7	–	4
Maine	4	–	4	5	–	6
Rhode Island	2	–	6	2	–	9
Boston University	1	–	7	1	–	10
UMass	1	–	7	2	–	9
Mid-Atlantic Division
No. 1 Villanova x$^	8	–	0	12	–	1
No. 3 Delaware ^	7	–	1	12	–	2
No. 20 Northeastern	5	–	3	8	–	3
Richmond	4	–	4	6	–	5
William & Mary	4	–	4	7	–	4
James Madison	3	–	5	5	–	6
$ – Conference champion; x – Division champion/co-champions; ^ – NCAA Division I-AA playoff participant; Rankings from The Sports Network poll

The 1997 Richmond Spiders football team was an American football team that represented the University of Richmond as a member of the Atlantic 10 Conference during the 1997 NCAA Division I-AA football season. In their third season under head coach Jim Reid, Richmond compiled a 6–5 record, with a mark of 4–4 in conference play, finishing tied for fourth place in the Mid-Atlantic division of the A-10.

== Schedule ==
Date	Opponent	Rank	Site	Result	Attendance	Source
August 30	at UMass		McGuirk Stadium; Hadley, MA	W 21–6	10,837	
September 6	at Colgate*		Andy Kerr Stadium; Hamilton, NY	W 23–7	5,000	
September 13	at Virginia*		Scott Stadium; Charlottesville, VA	L 7–26	38,200	
September 20	VMI*		University of Richmond Stadium; Richmond, VA (rivalry)	W 56–3	18,417	
October 4	Maine		University of Richmond Stadium; Richmond, VA	W 17–14	10,204	
October 11	at No. 6 Delaware	No. 21	Delaware Stadium; Newark, DE	L 7–24	14,324	
October 18	No. 3 Villanova		University of Richmond Stadium; Richmond, VA	L 29–40	6,240	
October 25	at James Madison		Bridgeforth Stadium; Harrisonburg, VA (rivalry)	W 26–21		
November 1	Northeastern		University of Richmond Stadium; Richmond, VA	L 17–21	4,619	
November 8	Rhode Island		University of Richmond Stadium; Richmond, VA	W 27–11	5,918	
November 15	at William & Mary		Zable Stadium; Williamsburg, VA (I-64 Bowl)	L 7–10	8,201	
*Non-conference game; Rankings from The Sports Network Poll released prior to the game
