= 1997 William & Mary Tribe football team =

American college football season

1997 William & Mary Tribe football
- Conference: Atlantic 10 Conference
- Mid-Atlantic Division
- Record: 7–4 (4–4 A-10)
- Head coach: Jimmye Laycock (18th season)
- Offensive coordinator: Zbig Kepa (5th season)
- Defensive coordinator: Russ Huesman (2nd season)
- Captains: Sean McDermott; Pete Coyne; Dan Rossettini; Jude Waddy
- Home stadium: Zable Stadium

1997 Atlantic 10 Conference football standings
	Conf.			Overall
Team	W		L	W		L
New England Division
New Hampshire x	5	–	3	5	–	6
Connecticut	4	–	4	7	–	4
Maine	4	–	4	5	–	6
Rhode Island	2	–	6	2	–	9
Boston University	1	–	7	1	–	10
UMass	1	–	7	2	–	9
Mid-Atlantic Division
No. 1 Villanova x$^	8	–	0	12	–	1
No. 3 Delaware ^	7	–	1	12	–	2
No. 20 Northeastern	5	–	3	8	–	3
Richmond	4	–	4	6	–	5
William & Mary	4	–	4	7	–	4
James Madison	3	–	5	5	–	6
$ – Conference champion; x – Division champion/co-champions; ^ – NCAA Division I-AA playoff participant; Rankings from The Sports Network poll

The 1997 William & Mary Tribe football team represented the College of William & Mary as member of the Mid-Atlantic Division of the Atlantic 10 Conference (A-10) during the 1997 NCAA Division I-AA football season. Led by Jimmye Laycock in his 18th year as head coach, William & Mary finished the season with an overall record of 7–4 and a mark of 4–4 in A-10 play, tying for fourth place the Mid-Atlantic Division.

== Schedule ==
Date	Opponent	Rank	Site	Result	Attendance	Source
August 30	Hampton*	No. 4	Zable Stadium; Williamsburg, VA	W 31–6	10,667	
September 6	at No. 23 Georgia Southern*	No. 3	Paulson Stadium; Statesboro, GA	W 29–28	10,329	
September 13	at VMI*	No. 3	Alumni Memorial Field; Lexington, VA (rivalry)	W 41–12	7,267	
September 20	at New Hampshire	No. 3	Cowell Stadium; Durham, NH	L 22–24	3,274	
September 27	Boston University	No. 9	Zable Stadium; Williamsburg, VA	W 20–17	8,574	
October 4	at Northeastern	No. 8	Parsons Field; Brookline, MA	L 12–33	3,112	
October 11	James Madison	No. 23	Zable Stadium; Williamsburg, VA (rivalry)	W 38–25	8,529	
October 18	at Connecticut	No. 18	Memorial Stadium; Storrs, CT	W 38–17	8,396	
October 25	No. 1 Villanova	No. 14	Zable Stadium; Williamsburg, VA	L 13–20	10,559	
November 1	at No. 3 Delaware	No. 20	Delaware Stadium; Newark, DE (rivalry)	L 0–14	18,707	
November 15	Richmond		Zable Stadium; Williamsburg, VA (I-64 Bowl)	W 10–7	8,201	
*Non-conference game; Rankings from The Sports Network Poll released prior to the game
