= 1997 NCAA Division I-AA football rankings =

The 1997 NCAA Division I-AA football rankings are from the Sports Network poll of Division I-AA head coaches, athletic directors, sports information directors and media members. This is for the 1997 season.

== Legend ==
	Increase in ranking
	Decrease in ranking
	Not ranked previous week
(#–#)	Win–loss record
(Italics)	Number of first place votes
т	Tied with team above or below also with this symbol

== The Sports Network poll ==
	Preseason	Week 1 Sept 2	Week 2 Sept 9	Week 3 Sept 16	Week 4 Sept 23	Week 5 Sept 30	Week 6 Oct 7	Week 7 Oct 14	Week 8 Oct 21	Week 9 Oct 28	Week 10 Nov 4	Week 11 Nov 11	Week 12 Nov 18	
1.	Montana	Montana (0–0)	Montana (0–0) (63)	Montana (1–0) (62)	Montana (2–0) (91)	Montana (3–0) (91)	Youngstown State (5–0) (56)	Youngstown State (6–0) (65)	Villanova (6–0) (74)	Villanova (7–0) (89)	Villanova (8–0) (83)	Villanova (9–0) (83)	Villanova (10–0) (83)	1.
2.	Troy State	Troy State (1–0)	Troy State (2–0) (10)	Troy State (2–0) (10)	Youngstown State (3–0)	Youngstown State (4–0)	Montana (3–1) (24)	Montana (4–1) (21)	McNeese State (6–0) (16)	Western Illinois (7–1) (3)	Western Illinois (8–1) (6)	Western Illinois (9–1) (6)	Western Illinois (9–1) (3)	2.
3.	Northern Iowa	William & Mary (1–0)	William & Mary (2–0) (3)	William & Mary (3–0) (7)	Western Kentucky (4–0)	Western Kentucky (5–0)	Villanova (4–0) (8)	Villanova (5–0) (4)	Western Illinois (6–1) (2)	Delaware (7–1) (1)	Delaware (8–1) (1)	Delaware (9–1) (1)	Delaware (10–1)	3.
4.	William & Mary	Northern Iowa (0–0)	Delaware (1–0)	Western Illinois (3–0)	Villanova (3–0)	Villanova (3–0)	McNeese State (5–0) (3)	McNeese State (6–0) (4)	Delaware (6–1) (1)	Youngstown State (6–1)	Youngstown State (7–1)	Youngstown State (8–1)	Youngstown State (9–1) (1)	4.
5.	Appalachian State	Western Illinois (1–0)	Western Illinois (2–0)	Youngstown State (2–0)	Northern Arizona (2–1)	Northern Arizona (3–1)	Western Illinois (4–1) (1)	Western Illinois (5–1)	Youngstown State (6–1) (2)	Western Kentucky (7–1)	Western Kentucky (8–1)	Western Kentucky (9–1)	Western Kentucky (9–1)	5.
6.	Eastern Illinois	Delaware (0–0)	East Tennessee State (2–0)	Western Kentucky (3–0)	Appalachian State (1–1)	Appalachian State (2–1)	Delaware (4–1)	Delaware (5–1)	Montana (4–2)	Southern (7–0) (1)	Southern (8–0) (3)	Eastern Washington (9–1) (4)	Eastern Washington (10–1) (6)	6.
7.	Northern Arizona	East Tennessee State (1–0)	Youngstown State (2–0)	Northern Arizona (1–1)	Troy State (2–1)	Troy State (3–1)	Western Kentucky (5–1)	Western Kentucky (5–1)	Western Kentucky (6–1)	Stephen F. Austin (6–1)	Stephen F. Austin (7–1) (2)	McNeese State (8–1) (1)	McNeese State (9–1)	7.
8.	Delaware	Appalachian State (0–0)	Northern Arizona (0–1)	Jackson State (3–0)	Western Illinois (3–1)	William & Mary (4–1)	East Tennessee State (4–1) (1)	Southern (5–0)	Southern (6–0)	Eastern Illinois (7–1)	Eastern Washington (8–1) (2)	Georgia Southern (8–2)	Georgia Southern (9–2) (1)	8.
9.	Western Illinois	Youngstown State (1–0)	Western Kentucky (2–0)	Appalachian State (0–1)	William & Mary (3–1)	Western Illinois (3–1)	Southern (5–0)	Georgia Southern (5–1) (1)	Eastern Illinois (6–1)	McNeese State (6–1)	Eastern Illinois (8–1)	Hampton (8–1) (2)	Hampton (9–1) (1)	9.
10.	Western Kentucky	Northern Arizona (0–1)	Furman (1–0)	Villanova (2–0)	Delaware (2–1)	McNeese State (4–0)	Eastern Illinois (5–1)	Eastern Illinois (5–1)	Stephen F. Austin (5–1)	Northern Arizona (6–2) (1)	McNeese State (7–1)	Florida A&M (7–2)	Florida A&M (8–2)	10.
11.	Youngstown State	Western Kentucky (1–0)	Appalachian State (0–1)	Delaware (1–1)	McNeese State (3–0)	Delaware (3–1)	Georgia Southern (4–1)	Northern Arizona (4–2)	Northern Arizona (5–2)	Eastern Washington (7–1) (1)	Georgia Southern (7–2)	Montana (6–3)	Montana (7–3)	11.
12.	East Tennessee State	Murray State (1–0)	Jackson State (2–0)	Northern Iowa (1–1)	Florida A&M (3–0)	Florida A&M (4–0)	Northern Arizona (3–2)	Stephen F. Austin (4–1)	Eastern Washington (6–1)	East Tennessee State (5–2)	Hampton (7–1)	Southern (8–1)	Southern (9–1)	12.
13.	Murray State	Furman (0–0)	Northern Iowa (0–1)	Southern (3–0)	Southern (4–0)	Southern (4–0)	Stephen F. Austin (3–1)	Jackson State (5–1)	East Tennessee State (4–2)	Hampton (7–1)	Montana (5–3)	Jackson State (7–2)	Stephen F. Austin (8–2)	13.
14.	Jackson State	Jackson State (1–0)	Stephen F. Austin (2–0)	East Tennessee State (2–1)	East Tennessee State (2–1)	East Tennessee State (3–1)	Appalachian State (2–2)	East Tennessee State (4–2)	William & Mary (6–2)	Georgia Southern (6–2)	Jackson State (7–2)	Stephen F. Austin (7–2)	Jackson State (8–2)	14.
15.	Stephen F. Austin	Stephen F. Austin (1–0)	Southern (2–0)	Florida A&M (2–0)	Nicholls State (2–1)	Eastern Illinois (4–1)	Jackson State (5–1)	Nicholls State (4–2)	Hampton (6–1)	Montana (4–3)	Florida A&M (6–2)	Appalachian State (6–3)	Appalachian State (7–3)	15.
16.	Furman	Florida A&M (1–0)	Florida A&M (1–0)	McNeese State (2–0)	Eastern Illinois (3–1)	Stephen F. Austin (3–1)	Florida A&M (4–1)	Troy State (4–2)	Georgia Southern (5–2) (1)	Jackson State (6–2)	Northern Arizona (6–3)	Eastern Illinois (8–2)	Eastern Illinois (8–2)	16.
17.	Southern	Southern (1–0)	Murray State (1–1)	Stephen F. Austin (2–1)	Stephen F. Austin (2–1)	Georgia Southern (3–1)	Northern Iowa (3–2)	Murray State (5–2)	Northern Iowa (4–3)	Florida A&M (5–2)	Appalachian State (5–3)	South Carolina State (8–1)	Hofstra (8–2)	17.
18.	Florida A&M	Northwestern State (0–0)	Villanova (1–0)	Furman (1–1)	Furman (1–1)	Furman (2–1)	Nicholls State (3–2)	William & Mary (5–2)	South Carolina State (6–0)	Appalachian State (4–3)	Dayton (9–0)	Dayton (9–0)	Cal Poly (9–1)	18.
19.	Howard	Villanova (1–0)	Eastern Illinois (1–1)	Eastern Illinois (2–1)	Jackson State (3–1)	Jackson State (4–1)	Troy State (3–2)	Hampton (5–1)	Furman (4–2)	Cal Poly (7–0) (1)	South Carolina State (7–1)	East Tennessee State (6–3)	Eastern Kentucky (7–3)	19.
20.	Northwestern State	Howard (0–0)	McNeese State (1–0)	Georgia Southern (1–1)	Georgia Southern (2–1)	Eastern Washington (4–0)	Murray State (4–2)	Eastern Washington (5–1)	Jackson State (5–2)	William & Mary (6–3)	East Tennessee State (5–3)	Liberty (8–1)	Northeastern (8–2)	20.
21.	New Hampshire	Eastern Kentucky (0–0)	Georgia Southern (1–1)	Eastern Washington (2–0)	Eastern Washington (3–0)	Northwestern State (2–1)	Richmond (4–1)	Florida A&M (4–2)	Florida A&M (5–2)	Dayton (8–0)	Hofstra (7–2)	Hofstra (7–2)	Northwestern State (7–3)	21.
22.	Eastern Kentucky	New Hampshire (0–0)	Eastern Kentucky (0–1)	Chattanooga (2–0)	Chattanooga (2–0)	James Madison (3–1)	SW Texas State (3–1)	Furman (3–2)	Appalachian State (3–3)	South Carolina State (6–1)	Liberty (7–1)	Cal Poly (8–1)	South Carolina State (8–2)	22.
23.	Nicholls State	Georgia Southern (1–0)	Howard (0–1)	Northwestern State (1–1)	Northern Iowa (1–2)	Northern Iowa (2–2)	William & Mary (4–2)	South Carolina State (5–0)	Dayton (7–0)	Chattanooga (6–1)	Cal Poly (7–1)	Eastern Kentucky (6–3)	Dayton (9–1)	23.
24.	SW Missouri State	Eastern Illinois (0–1)	Northwestern State (0–1)	Weber State (2–0)	Northwestern State (1–1)	Nicholls State (2–2)	Connecticut (4–0)	Northern Iowa (3–3)	North Carolina A&T (5–1)	Hofstra (6–2)	Eastern Kentucky (5–3)	Northeastern (7–2)	Bucknell (10–0)	24.
25.	Buffalo	Buffalo (1–0)	Nicholls State (1–1)	Nicholls State (1–1)	James Madison (2–1)	Murray State (2–2)	Hampton (4–1)	SW Texas State (3–2)	Troy State (4–3)	Nicholls State (5–3)	Northeastern (6–2)	Northwestern State (6–3)	Liberty (8–2)	25.
	Preseason	Week 1 Sept 2	Week 2 Sept 9	Week 3 Sept 16	Week 4 Sept 23	Week 5 Sept 30	Week 6 Oct 7	Week 7 Oct 14	Week 8 Oct 21	Week 9 Oct 28	Week 10 Nov 4	Week 11 Nov 11	Week 12 Nov 18	
		Dropped: 23 Nicholls State; 24 SW Missouri State	Dropped: 22 New Hampshire; 25 Buffalo	Dropped: 17 Murray State; 22 Eastern Kentucky; 23 Howard	Dropped: 24 Weber State	Dropped: 22 Chattanooga	Dropped: 18 Furman; 20 Eastern Washington; 21 Northwestern State; 22 James Madison	Dropped: 14 Appalachian State; 21 Richmond; 24 Connecticut	Dropped: 15 Nicholls State; 17 Murray State; 25 SW Texas State	Dropped: 17 Northern Iowa; 19 Furman; 24 North Carolina A&T; 25 Troy State	Dropped: 20 William & Mary; 23 Chattanooga; 25 Nicholls State	Dropped: 16 Northern Arizona	Dropped: 19 East Tennessee State	
