= Al Bagnoli =

American football player and coach (born 1953)

Biographical details
- Born: January 20, 1953 (age 73)

Playing career
- 1972–1974: Central Connecticut

Coaching career (HC unless noted)
- 1975: Albany (GA)
- 1976–1977: Albany (DC)
- 1978–1981: Union (NY) (DC)
- 1982–1991: Union (NY)
- 1992–2014: Penn
- 2015–2022: Columbia

Head coaching record
- Overall: 269–134
- Tournaments: 7–6 (NCAA D-III playoffs)

Accomplishments and honors

Championships
- 9 Ivy (1993, 1994, 1998, 2000, 2002, 2003, 2009, 2010, 2012)

Awards
- Ivy League Coach of the Year (2017); AFCA Region I Coach of the Year (1983, 1989, 1991, 2017); ECAC FCS Coach of the Year (2017)

Eldo P. "Al" Bagnoli (born January 20, 1953) is an American former college football coach. He served as the head football coach at Union College in Schenectady, New York from 1982 to 1991, the University of Pennsylvania from 1992 to 2014, and Columbia University from 2015 to 2022. As of 2023, he is 21st on the list of all-time winningest college football coaches.

== Playing and coaching career ==
Bagnoli played three years of varsity football at Central Connecticut State University, graduating in 1975. He went on to pursue a master's degree at the University at Albany and worked there the 1975 season as a graduate assistant. He was promoted to defensive coordinator after just one season and stayed in that role until moving to NCAA Division III Union College in 1978. In 1982, he became head coach at Union.

His first year at Union was the program's first winning season in a dozen years and he posted a winning record every single year during his decade at the school. In 1983 and 1989, Bagnoli and Union reached the NCAA Division III title game and he won Coach of the Year honors twice, in 1983 and 1991.

In 1992, he was hired by the [[University of Pennsylvania]] and is arguably the most successful coach in that school's history. In 23 seasons at Penn he won nine Ivy League titles, all of them outright, an Ivy League record. In 1993, 1994, 2003, and 2009 Penn had undefeated seasons. His overall record at Penn is 148–80. He is one of only two coaches at Penn to have 100 wins at that school. His Ivy League record at Penn was 112–49.

In 1997, all-Ivy defensive tackle Mitch Marrow was involved in an eligibility scandal. A four-university panel eventually determined that Marrow was not enrolled as a full-time student due to dropping several courses and should not have been considered eligible to play. As a result, Penn offered to forfeit all wins in games in which he appeared. This led to a 1–9 record; the on-field record in 1997 had been 6–4.

Two Penn football players have committed suicide during Bagnoli's tenure: senior running back Kyle Ambrogi during the 2005 season, and junior defensive end Owen Thomas in the spring of 2009. The death of Thomas has been attributed to chronic traumatic encephalopathy (CTE), the disease linked to concussions.

== Head coaching record ==
Year	Team	Overall	Conference	Standing	Bowl/playoffs
Union Dutchmen (NCAA Division III independent) (1982–1991)
1982	Union	8–1			
1983	Union	10–2			L NCAA Division III Championship
1984	Union	9–2			L NCAA Division III Semifinal
1985	Union	9–1			L NCAA Division III First Round
1986	Union	9–1			L NCAA Division III First Round
1987	Union	5–5			
1988	Union	4–4			
1989	Union	13–1			L NCAA Division III Championship
1990	Union	9–1			
1991	Union	10–1			L NCAA Division III Quarterfinal
Union:		86–19			
Penn Quakers (Ivy League) (1992–2014)
1992	Penn	7–3	5–2	3rd	
1993	Penn	10–0	7–0	1st	
1994	Penn	9–0	7–0	1st	
1995	Penn	7–3	5–2	T–2nd	
1996	Penn	5–5	3–4	5th	
1997	Penn	1–9	0–7	8th	
1998	Penn	8–2	6–1	1st	
1999	Penn	5–5	4–3	4th	
2000	Penn	7–3	6–1	1st	
2001	Penn	8–1	6–1	2nd	
2002	Penn	9–1	7–0	1st	
2003	Penn	10–0	7–0	1st	
2004	Penn	8–2	6–1	2nd	
2005	Penn	5–5	3–4	6th	
2006	Penn	5–5	3–4	T–4th	
2007	Penn	4–6	3–4	T–4th	
2008	Penn	6–4	5–2	3rd	
2009	Penn	8–2	7–0	1st	
2010	Penn	9–1	7–0	1st	
2011	Penn	5–5	4–3	T–2nd	
2012	Penn	6–4	6–1	1st	
2013	Penn	4–6	3–4	T–4th	
2014	Penn	2–8	2–5	6th	
Penn:		148–80	112–49		
Columbia Lions (Ivy League) (2015–2022)
2015	Columbia	2–8	1–6	T–7th	
2016	Columbia	3–7	2–5	T–6th	
2017	Columbia	8–2	5–2	T–2nd	
2018	Columbia	6–4	3–4	T–4th	
2019	Columbia	3–7	2–5	T–6th	
2020–21	No team—COVID-19				
2021	Columbia	7–3	4–3	T–4th	
2022	Columbia	6–4	3–4	5th	
Columbia:		35–35	20–29		
Total:		269–134			
National championship Conference title Conference division title or championship game berth

== See also ==
- List of college football career coaching wins leaders
