= 1997 Davidson Wildcats football team =

American college football season

1997 Davidson Wildcats football
- Conference: Independent
- Record: 3–8
- Head coach: Tim Landis (5th season)
- Home stadium: Richardson Stadium

1997 NCAA Division I-AA independents football standings
	Conf.			Overall
Team	W		L	W		L
No. 18 Cal Poly		–		10	–	1
No. 5 Western Kentucky ^		–		10	–	2
No. 17 Hofstra ^		–		9	–	2
No. 25 Liberty		–		9	–	2
Samford		–		7	–	4
Morehead State		–		5	–	4
South Florida		–		5	–	6
Southern Utah		–		5	–	6
Saint Mary's		–		4	–	6
Davidson		–		3	–	8
Buffalo		–		2	–	9
La Salle		–		1	–	8
Charleston Southern		–		1	–	9
Austin Peay		–		0	–	10
^ – NCAA Division I-AA playoff participant; Rankings from The Sports Network poll

The 1997 Davidson Wildcats football team was an American football team that represented Davidson College as an independent during the 1997 NCAA Division I-AA football season. Led by fifth-year head coach Tim Landis, the team compiled a 3–8 record.

== Schedule ==
Date	Opponent	Site	Result	Attendance	Source
September 13	Maryville (TN)	Richardson Stadium; Davidson, NC	W 41–25		
September 20	Sewanee	Richardson Stadium; Davidson, NC	W 42–14	3,188	
September 27	at Emory and Henry	Fullerton Field; Emory, VA	L 35–49		
October 4	at Guilford	Armfield Athletic Center; Greensboro, NC	L 22–25		
October 11	at Washington and Lee	Wilson Field; Lexington, VA	L 22–32	4,000	
October 18	Methodist	Richardson Stadium; Davidson, NC	L 16–19	3,178	
October 25	at Randolph–Macon	Day Field; Ashland, VA	L 15–22	850	
November 1	Hampden–Sydney	Richardson Stadium; Davidson, NC	W 43–0		
November 8	at Centre	Farris Stadium; Danville, KY	L 14–19		
November 15	Bridgewater	Richardson Stadium; Davidson, NC	L 10–13 ^{OT}		
November 22	at South Florida	Houlihan's Stadium; Tampa, FL	L 32–48	27,919	
