= 1997 Cornell Big Red football team =

American college football season

1997 Cornell Big Red football
- Conference: Ivy League
- Record: 6–4 (4–3 Ivy)
- Head coach: Jim Hofher (8th season)
- Captains: Chris Allen; Justin Bird; Scott Carroll; Eric Krawczyk; Rich Sheerin
- Home stadium: Schoellkopf Field

1997 Ivy League football standings
	Conf.			Overall
Team	W		L	W		L
Harvard $	7	–	0	9	–	1
Dartmouth	6	–	1	8	–	2
Brown	4	–	3	7	–	3
Cornell	4	–	3	6	–	4
Princeton	3	–	4	6	–	4
Columbia	3	–	4	4	–	6
Yale	1	–	6	2	–	8
Penn *	0	–	7	1	–	9
$ – Conference champion; * Standings reflect Penn's forfeit of five conference wins due to use of an ineligible player

The 1997 Cornell Big Red football team was an American football team that represented Cornell University during the 1997 NCAA Division I-AA football season. Cornell tied for third in the Ivy League.

In its eighth and final season under head coach Jim Hofher, the team compiled a 6–4 record and outscored opponents 269 to 261. Chris Allen, Justin Bird, Scott Carroll, Eric Krawczyk and Rich Sheerin were the team captains.

Despite a 4–3 conference record that tied for third in the Ivy League standings, the Big Red were outscored by Ivy opponents, 170 to 145. Cornell originally finished in a tie for fourth place, but after the season ended, third-place Penn forfeited all of its league wins, dropping to last place and allowing Brown and Cornell to move up to third.

Cornell played its home games at Schoellkopf Field in Ithaca, New York.

== Schedule ==
Date	Opponent	Site	Result	Attendance	Source
September 20	Princeton	Schoellkopf Field; Ithaca, NY	W 14–10	7,127	
September 27	Colgate^{†}*	Schoellkopf Field; Ithaca, NY (rivalry)	L 38–44 ^{OT}	11,700	
October 4	at Dartmouth	Memorial Field; Hanover, NH (rivalry)	L 20–24	6,641	
October 11	Harvard	Schoellkopf Field; Ithaca, NY	L 9–34	5,287	
October 18	Lafayette*	Schoellkopf Field; Ithaca, NY	W 41–34 ^{2OT}	4,812	
October 25	at Fordham*	Coffey Field; Bronx, NY	W 45–13	878	
November 1	at Brown	Brown Stadium; Providence, RI	L 12–37	2,557	
November 8	Yale	Schoellkopf Field; Ithaca, NY	W 37–10	3,995	
November 15	Columbia	Schoellkopf Field; Ithaca, NY (rivalry)	W 33–22	1,158	
November 22	at Penn	Franklin Field; Philadelphia, PA (rivalry)	W 20–33	5,918	
*Non-conference game; ^{†}Homecoming

== Note ==
a: In January 1998, Penn agreed to forfeit its Ivy League wins from 1997 after star defensive tackle Mitch Marrow was declared ineligible as a part-time student. Cornell's and Penn's record books regard their 1997 meeting, a 33–20 Penn victory on the field, as a Cornell win, as do the 1997 win–loss records and season standings in the Ivy League record book.
