= 1997 Dartmouth Big Green football team =

American college football season

1997 Dartmouth Big Green football
- Conference: Ivy League
- Record: 8–2 (6–1 Ivy)
- Head coach: John Lyons (6th season)
- Offensive coordinator: Roger Hughes (6th season)
- Defensive coordinator: Tom Gilmore (1st season)
- Captains: William Harper; Lloyd Lee; Zachary Walz
- Home stadium: Memorial Field

1997 Ivy League football standings
	Conf.			Overall
Team	W		L	W		L
Harvard $	7	–	0	9	–	1
Dartmouth	6	–	1	8	–	2
Brown	4	–	3	7	–	3
Cornell	4	–	3	6	–	4
Princeton	3	–	4	6	–	4
Columbia	3	–	4	4	–	6
Yale	1	–	6	2	–	8
Penn *	0	–	7	1	–	9
$ – Conference champion; * Standings reflect Penn's forfeit of five conference wins due to use of an ineligible player

The 1997 Dartmouth Big Green football team was an American football team that represented Dartmouth College during the 1997 NCAA Division I-AA football season. Dartmouth finished second in the Ivy League.

In their sixth season under head coach John Lyons, the Big Green compiled an 8–2 record and outscored opponents 208 to 165. William Harper, Lloyd Lee and Zachary Walz were the team captains.

Walz, a junior linebacker, earned his third consecutive unanimous First-Time All-Ivy selection. The Arizona Cardinals subsequently selected Walz in the 6th Round (158th overall) of the 1998 NFL draft, making him Dartmouth's first NFL Draft pick since 1978. Walz went on to log more than 100 tackles in four seasons with Arizona, where he was roommates with safety Pat Tillman, whom he had played against in high school in northern California.

The Big Green's 6–1 conference record placed second in the Ivy League standings. Dartmouth outscored Ivy opponents 116 to 103.

Dartmouth played its home games at Memorial Field on the college campus in Hanover, New Hampshire.

== Schedule ==
Date	Opponent	Site	Result	Attendance	Source
September 20	at Penn	Franklin Field; Philadelphia, PA	W 23–15	11,123	
September 27	at Holy Cross*	Fitton Field; Worcester, MA	W 35–6	3,000	
October 4	Cornell	Memorial Field; Hanover, NH (rivalry)	W 24–20	6,641	
October 11	at Fordham*	Coffey Field; Bronx, NY	W 31–10	3,711	
October 18	at Yale	Yale Bowl; New Haven, CT	W 21–7	17,973	
October 25	Lehigh*	Memorial Field; Hanover, NH	L 26–46	4,525	
November 1	Harvard	Memorial Field; Hanover, NH (rivalry)	L 0–24	13,111	
November 8	at Columbia	Wien Stadium; New York, NY	W 23–21	1,375	
November 15	Brown	Memorial Field; Hanover, NH	W 13–7	2,515	
November 22	Princeton	Memorial Field; Hanover, NH	W 12–9 ^{OT}	3,022	
*Non-conference game
