= Ray Tellier =

American football player and coach (born 1972)

Current position
- Title: Associate athletic director
- Team: Columbia
- Conference: Ivy

Biographical details
- Born: June 10, 1951 (age 75); West Haven, Connecticut, U.S.

Playing career
- 1969–1972: Connecticut
- Position: Quarterback

Coaching career (HC unless noted)
- 1973: Connecticut (GA)
- 1974: Dartmouth (freshman backs)
- 1975: Wabash (assistant)
- 1977: Boston University (DB)
- 1978: Brown (receivers)
- 1978–1981: Brown (OB)
- 1982–1983: Brown (OC/OB)
- 1984–1988: Rochester (NY)
- 1989–2002: Columbia

Administrative career (AD unless noted)
- 2005–present: Columbia (associate AD)

Head coaching record
- Overall: 63–122–3
- Tournaments: 0–1 (NCAA D-III playoffs)

Accomplishments and honors

Awards
- AFCA NCAA Division I-AA Coach of the Year (1996)

Ray Tellier Jr. (born June 10, 1951) is an American college athletics administrator and former college football player and coach. He currently serves as an associate athletics director at Columbia University, a position he has held since 2005. Tellier was the head football coach at the University of Rochester from 1984 to 1988 and at Columbia from 1989 to 2002, compiling a career record of 63–122–3.

== Biography ==
Tellier grew up in West Haven, Connecticut and was a high school football All-American, playing for his father in 1968 at Notre Dame High School of West Haven, CT. He attended the University of Connecticut and lead that team to the Yankee Conference title in 1971.

After graduating from Connecticut in 1973, Tellier entered the coaching ranks, serving as an assistant at Connecticut, Dartmouth College, Wabash College, and Boston University during the 1970s. In 1978, he became offensive coordinator at Brown University under head coach John A. Anderson. Brown was experiencing a revival in football at the time and Tellier's time there was a successful one.

When Anderson resigned in 1983, Tellier moved on to become head coach at University of Rochester, an NCAA Division III school. He turned the moribund program around over the next five years, going 9–2 and making the NCAA Division III playoffs for the first time in school history, in 1987. His overall record at Rochester was 21–26–1.

In 1989 Tellier was hired by Columbia and asked to revive their program (which had just broken a 44-game losing streak) in a similar fashion. His results were mixed. Significant improvement did not begin to be seen until 1994 and in 1996 the team would win eight games for the first time since 1945. But thereafter the team slowly declined again until by 2002 the team was again winless in the Ivy League. Tellier stepped aside at the end of that season and joined the administrative side of the athletic department. In 2005, he was appointed an associate athletics director and continues to serve in that capacity.

== Head coaching record ==
| Year | Team | Overall | Conference | Standing | Bowl/playoffs |
|---|---|---|---|---|---|
Rochester Yellowjackets (NCAA Division III independent) (1984–1988)
| 1984 | Rochester | 1–8 | | | |
| 1985 | Rochester | 2–7 | | | |
| 1986 | Rochester | 1–7–1 | | | |
| 1987 | Rochester | 9–2 | | | L NCAA Division III First Round |
| 1988 | Rochester | 8–2 | | | |
| Rochester: | | 21–26–1 | | | |
Columbia Lions (Ivy League) (1989–2002)
| 1989 | Columbia | 1–9 | 1–6 | 8th | |
| 1990 | Columbia | 1–9 | 1–6 | 8th | |
| 1991 | Columbia | 1–9 | 1–6 | T–7th | |
| 1992 | Columbia | 3–7 | 2–5 | T–6th | |
| 1993 | Columbia | 2–8 | 1–6 | T–7th | |
| 1994 | Columbia | 5–4–1 | 3–4 | T–4th | |
| 1995 | Columbia | 3–6–1 | 3–4 | 5th | |
| 1996 | Columbia | 8–2 | 5–2 | 2nd | |
| 1997 | Columbia | 4–6 | 3–4 | T–5th | |
| 1998 | Columbia | 4–6 | 3–4 | T–5th | |
| 1999 | Columbia | 3–7 | 1–6 | T–7th | |
| 2000 | Columbia | 3–7 | 1–6 | T–7th | |
| 2001 | Columbia | 3–7 | 3–4 | T–4th | |
| 2002 | Columbia | 1–9 | 0–7 | 8th | |
| Columbia: | | 42–96–2 | 28–70 | | |
| Total: | | 63–122–3 | | | |
