= Tom Gadd =

American football coach (1947–2003)

Biographical details
- Born: March 8, 1947
- Died: March 1, 2003 (aged 55); Lewisburg, Pennsylvania, U.S.
- Education: UC Riverside (1970)

Coaching career (HC unless noted)
- 1972–1973: UC Riverside (DC)
- 1974–1976: Long Beach State (DC)
- 1977–1982: Utah (DC)
- 1983–1986: South Carolina (DC)
- 1987–1989: Utah (DC)
- 1990–1991: Minnesota (DC)
- 1993–1994: San Jose State (DC)
- 1995–2001: Bucknell

Head coaching record
- Overall: 48–28

Accomplishments and honors

Championships
- 1 Patriot (1996)

Tom Gadd (March 8, 1947 – March 1, 2003) was an American football coach. He served as the head football coach at Bucknell University in Lewisburg, Pennsylvania from 1995 to 2001, compiling a record of 48–28.

== Head coaching record ==
Year	Team	Overall	Conference	Standing	Bowl/playoffs	TSN^{#}
Bucknell Bison (Patriot League) (1995–2001)
1995	Bucknell	7–4	4–1	2nd		
1996	Bucknell	6–5	4–1	1st		
1997	Bucknell	10–1	5–1	2nd		24
1998	Bucknell	6–5	3–3	T–3rd		
1999	Bucknell	7–4	3–3	4th		
2000	Bucknell	6–5	2–4	5th		
2001	Bucknell	6–4	4–3	4th		
Bucknell:		48–28	25–16			
Total:		48–28				
National championship Conference title Conference division title or championship game berth
