= 1997 Yale Bulldogs football team =

American college football season

1997 Yale Bulldogs football
- Conference: Ivy League
- Record: 2–8 (1–6 Ivy)
- Head coach: Jack Siedlecki (1st season)
- Home stadium: Yale Bowl

1997 Ivy League football standings
	Conf.			Overall
Team	W		L	W		L
Harvard $	7	–	0	9	–	1
Dartmouth	6	–	1	8	–	2
Brown	4	–	3	7	–	3
Cornell	4	–	3	6	–	4
Princeton	3	–	4	6	–	4
Columbia	3	–	4	4	–	6
Yale	1	–	6	2	–	8
Penn *	0	–	7	1	–	9
$ – Conference champion; * Standings reflect Penn's forfeit of five conference wins due to use of an ineligible player

The 1997 Yale Bulldogs football team represented Yale University in the 1997 NCAA Division I-AA football season. The Bulldogs were led by first-year head coach Jack Siedlecki, played their home games at the Yale Bowl and finished in seventh place in the Ivy League.

Yale's record book lists a 1–9 record for 1997, 0–7 in Ivy League play. The Ivy League record book, however, credits Yale with a conference win after Penn forfeited its victories. Yale is thus recorded by the league as its seventh-place finisher in 1997, ahead of Penn.

== Schedule ==
Date	Opponent	Site	Result	Attendance	Source
September 20	Brown	Yale Bowl; New Haven, CT	L 14–52	15,315	
September 27	Connecticut*	Yale Bowl; New Haven, CT	L 0–28	16,367	
October 3	vs. Valparaiso*	Soldier Field; Chicago, IL	W 34–14	7,668	
October 11	Bucknell*	Yale Bowl; New Haven, CT	L 24–25	11,239	
October 18	Dartmouth	Yale Bowl; New Haven, CT	L 7–21	17,973	
October 25	at Columbia	Wien Stadium; New York, NY	L 10–21	4,665	
November 1	Penn	Yale Bowl; New Haven, CT	W 7–26	3,600	
November 8	at Cornell	Schoellkopf Field; Ithaca, NY	L 10–37	3,995	
November 15	vs. Princeton	Giants Stadium; East Rutherford, NJ (rivalry)	L 0–9	7,731	
November 22	Harvard	Yale Bowl; New Haven, CT (The Game)	L 7–17	26,064	
*Non-conference game

== Note ==
a: In January 1998, Penn agreed to forfeit its Ivy League wins from 1997 after star defensive tackle Mitch Marrow was declared ineligible as a part-time student. Both teams' record books claim their 1997 meeting, a 26–7 Penn victory on the field, as a loss. Yale thus computes its season record as 1–9, and its Ivy League record as 0–6. The Ivy League's own record book, however, regards the game as a Yale victory (by forfeit), and computes win–loss records and season standings accordingly.
