= 1997 Brown Bears football team =

American college football season

1997 Brown Bears football
- Conference: Ivy League
- Record: 7–3 (4–3 Ivy)
- Head coach: Mark Whipple (4th season)
- Defensive coordinator: Don Brown (2nd season)
- Captains: J. Karcutskie; D. McClutchy
- Home stadium: Brown Stadium

1997 Ivy League football standings
	Conf.			Overall
Team	W		L	W		L
Harvard $	7	–	0	9	–	1
Dartmouth	6	–	1	8	–	2
Brown	4	–	3	7	–	3
Cornell	4	–	3	6	–	4
Princeton	3	–	4	6	–	4
Columbia	3	–	4	4	–	6
Yale	1	–	6	2	–	8
Penn *	0	–	7	1	–	9
$ – Conference champion; * Standings reflect Penn's forfeit of five conference wins due to use of an ineligible player

The 1997 Brown Bears football team was an American football team that represented Brown University during the 1997 NCAA Division I-AA football season. Brown tied for third in the Ivy League.

In their fourth and final season under head coach Mark Whipple, the Bears compiled a 4–3 record and outscored opponents 274 to 194. J. Karcutskie and D. McClutchy were the team captains.

The Bears' 4–3 conference record tied for third place in the Ivy League standings. They outscored Ivy opponents 171 to 138.

Brown played its home games at Brown Stadium in Providence, Rhode Island.

== Schedule ==
Date	Opponent	Site	Result	Attendance	Source
September 20	at Yale	Yale Bowl; New Haven, CT	W 52–14	15,315	
September 27	Lafayette*	Brown Stadium; Providence, RI	W 35–27	3,172	
October 4	at Fordham*	Coffey Field; Bronx, NY	W 45–14	6,171	
October 11	Princeton	Brown Stadium; Providence, RI	L 13–30	4,022	
October 18	Rhode Island*	Brown Stadium; Providence, RI (rivalry)	W 23–15	4,922	
October 25	at Penn	Franklin Field; Philadelphia, PA	W 10–31	12,237	
November 1	Cornell	Brown Stadium; Providence, RI	W 37–12	2,557	
November 8	Harvard^{†}	Brown Stadium; Providence, RI	L 10–27	3,188	
November 15	at Dartmouth	Memorial Field; Hanover, NH	L 7–13	2,515	
November 22	Columbia	Brown Stadium; Providence, RI	W 42–11	1,520	
*Non-conference game; ^{†}Homecoming

== Note ==
a: In January 1998, Penn agreed to forfeit its Ivy League wins from 1997 after star defensive tackle Mitch Marrow was declared ineligible as a part-time student. Brown's and Penn's record books regard their 1997 meeting, a 31–10 Penn victory on the field, as a Brown win, as do the 1997 win–loss records and season standings in the Ivy League record book.
