= 1997 Columbia Lions football team =

American college football season

1997 Columbia Lions football
- Conference: Ivy League
- Record: 4–6 (3–4 Ivy)
- Head coach: Ray Tellier (9th season)
- Captains: Jay DuPertuis; Matt Kuhn
- Home stadium: Wien Stadium

1997 Ivy League football standings
	Conf.			Overall
Team	W		L	W		L
Harvard $	7	–	0	9	–	1
Dartmouth	6	–	1	8	–	2
Brown	4	–	3	7	–	3
Cornell	4	–	3	6	–	4
Princeton	3	–	4	6	–	4
Columbia	3	–	4	4	–	6
Yale	1	–	6	2	–	8
Penn *	0	–	7	1	–	9
$ – Conference champion; * Standings reflect Penn's forfeit of five conference wins due to use of an ineligible player

The 1997 Columbia Lions football team was an American football team that represented Columbia University during the 1997 NCAA Division I-AA football season. Columbia tied for fifth in the Ivy League.

In their ninth season under head coach Ray Tellier, the Lions compiled a 4–6 record and were outscored 259 to 141. Jay DuPertuis and Matt Kuhn were the team captains.

The Lions' 3–4 conference record tied for fifth in the Ivy League standings. Columbia was outscored 177 to 106 by Ivy opponents.

Columbia played its homes games at Lawrence A. Wien Stadium in Upper Manhattan, in New York City.

== Schedule ==
Date	Opponent	Site	Result	Attendance	Source
September 20	at Harvard	Harvard Stadium; Boston, MA	L 7–45	7,658	
September 27	Towson*	Wien Stadium; New York, NY	W 16–6	2,710	
October 4	at Lafayette*	Fisher Field; Easton, PA	L 3–31	3,822	
October 11	Holy Cross*	Wien Stadium; New York, NY	L 16–45	3,335	
October 18	Penn	Wien Stadium; New York, NY	W 7–24	3,909	
October 25	Yale^{†}	Wien Stadium; New York, NY	W 21–10	4,665	
November 1	Princeton	Wien Stadium; New York, NY	W 17–0	1,015	
November 8	Dartmouth	Wien Stadium; New York, NY	L 21–23	1,375	
November 15	at Cornell	Schoellkopf Field; Ithaca, NY (rivalry)	L 22–33	1,158	
November 22	at Brown	Brown Stadium; Providence, RI	L 11–42	1,520	
*Non-conference game; ^{†}Homecoming

== Note ==
a: In January 1998, Penn agreed to forfeit its Ivy League wins from 1997 after star defensive tackle Mitch Marrow was declared ineligible as a part-time student. Columbia's and Penn's record books regard their 1997 meeting, a 24–7 Penn victory on the field, as a Columbia win, as do the 1997 win–loss records and season standings in the Ivy League record book.
