= 1997 Princeton Tigers football team =

American college football season

1997 Princeton Tigers football
- Conference: Ivy League
- Record: 6–4 (4–3 Ivy)
- Head coach: Steve Tosches (11th season)
- Captains: Mike Clifford; Tim Greene
- Home stadium: Giants Stadium, Lions Stadium

1997 Ivy League football standings
	Conf.			Overall
Team	W		L	W		L
Harvard $	7	–	0	9	–	1
Dartmouth	6	–	1	8	–	2
Brown	4	–	3	7	–	3
Cornell	4	–	3	6	–	4
Princeton	3	–	4	6	–	4
Columbia	3	–	4	4	–	6
Yale	1	–	6	2	–	8
Penn *	0	–	7	1	–	9
$ – Conference champion; * Standings reflect Penn's forfeit of five conference wins due to use of an ineligible player

The 1997 Princeton Tigers football team was an American football team that represented Princeton University during the 1997 NCAA Division I-AA football season. Princeton tied for fifth in the Ivy League.

In their 11th year under head coach Steve Tosches, the Tigers compiled a 6–4 record and outscored opponents 148 to 132. Mike Clifford and Tim Greene were the team captains.

Princeton's 4–3 conference record tied for fifth in the Ivy League standings. The Tigers were outscored 90 to 87 by Ivy opponents.

For the first time in more than a century, Princeton played none of its home games on campus, as Palmer Stadium had been demolished and construction of its replacement, Princeton University Stadium, was still in progress. The Tigers' two "home" games were played at Lions Stadium, the home field of The College of New Jersey, and at Giants Stadium, the New Jersey home of two NFL teams.

== Schedule ==
Date	Opponent	Site	Result	Attendance	Source
September 20	at Cornell	Schoellkopf Field; Ithaca, NY	L 10–14	7,127	
September 27	vs. Fordham*	Lions Field; Ewing, NJ	W 9–7	4,050	
October 4	at Holy Cross*	Fitton Field; Worcester, MA	W 21–7	8,542	
October 11	at Brown	Brown Stadium; Providence, RI	W 30–13	4,022	
October 18	at Colgate*	Andy Kerr Stadium; Hamilton, NY	W 31–28		
October 25	at Harvard	Harvard Stadium; Boston, MA (rivalry)	L 12–14	8,480	
November 1	at Columbia	Wien Stadium; New York, NY	L 0–17	1,015	
November 8	at Penn	Franklin Field; Philadelphia, PA (rivalry)	W 17–20	15,847	
November 15	vs. Yale	Giants Stadium; East Rutherford, NJ (rivalry)	W 9–0	7,731	
November 22	at Dartmouth	Memorial Field; Hanover, NH	L 9–12 ^{OT}	3,022	
*Non-conference game

== Note ==
a: In January 1998, Penn agreed to forfeit its Ivy League wins from 1997 after star defensive tackle Mitch Marrow was declared ineligible as a part-time student. Princeton's and Penn's record books regard their 1997 meeting, a 20–17 Penn victory on the field, as a Princeton win, as do the 1997 win–loss records and season standings in the Ivy League record book.
