= 1997 Penn Quakers football team =

American college football season

1997 Penn Quakers football
- Conference: Ivy League
- Record: 1–9 (0–7 Ivy)
- Head coach: Al Bagnoli (6th season)
- Defensive coordinator: Mike Toop (6th season)
- Captain: John Bishop
- Home stadium: Franklin Field

1997 Ivy League football standings
	Conf.			Overall
Team	W		L	W		L
Harvard $	7	–	0	9	–	1
Dartmouth	6	–	1	8	–	2
Brown	4	–	3	7	–	3
Cornell	4	–	3	6	–	4
Princeton	3	–	4	6	–	4
Columbia	3	–	4	4	–	6
Yale	1	–	6	2	–	8
Penn *	0	–	7	1	–	9
$ – Conference champion; * Standings reflect Penn's forfeit of five conference wins due to use of an ineligible player

The 1997 Penn Quakers football team was an American football team that represented the University of Pennsylvania during the 1997 NCAA Division I-AA football season. Penn finished last in the Ivy League after forfeiting five wins.

== Background ==
During its sixth year under head coach Al Bagnoli, the Quakers outscored opponents 250 to 113 and compiled a 6–4 record on the field. It later forfeited five victories, however, yielding a final record of 1–9.

John Bishop was the team captain.

Penn agreed to forfeit all of its Ivy League wins after an internal investigation showed that All-Ivy defensive tackle Mitch Marrow had not been a full-time student during the football season, and was thus ineligible to play on the team. The decision was announced in early January 1998, a month and a half after the season ended.

This decision had a profound impact on the league standings. Penn had gone 5–2 against Ivy competition, outscoring its conference rivals 149 to 117. At season's end, Penn was reported as the third-place team. After the forfeits, record books show Penn with an 0–7 league record, finishing in last place.

Penn played its home games at Franklin Field on the university's campus in Philadelphia, Pennsylvania.

== Schedule ==
Date	Opponent	Site	Result	Attendance	Source
September 20	Dartmouth	Franklin Field; Philadelphia, PA	L 15–23	11,123	
September 27	at Bucknell*	Christy Mathewson–Memorial Stadium; Lewisburg, PA	L 16–20	10,172	
October 4	Towson*	Franklin Field; Philadelphia, PA	W 26–14	6,806	
October 11	at Lehigh*	Goodman Stadium; Bethlehem, PA	L 7–24	10,111	
October 18	at Columbia	Wien Stadium; New York, NY	L 24–7 ^	3,909	
October 25	Brown	Franklin Field; Philadelphia, PA	L 31–10 ^	12,237	
November 1	at Yale	Yale Bowl; New Haven, CT	L 26–7 ^	3,600	
November 8	Princeton	Franklin Field; Philadelphia, PA (rivalry)	L 20–17 ^	15,847	
November 15	at Harvard	Harvard Stadium; Boston, MA (rivalry)	L 0–33	5,452	
November 22	Cornell	Franklin Field; Philadelphia, PA (rivalry)	L 33–20 ^	5,918	
*Non-conference game; ^ Penn forfeit
