= Jim Hofher =

American football player and coach (born 1957)

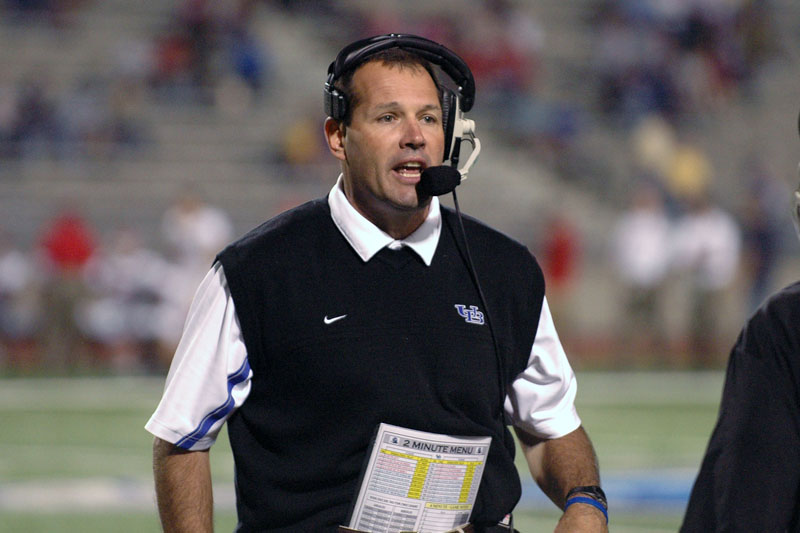

Biographical details
- Born: October 12, 1957 (age 69); Middletown, Connecticut, U.S.

Playing career
- 1976–1978: Cornell
- Position: Quarterback

Coaching career (HC unless noted)
- 1979–1980: Wake Forest (GA)
- 1981–1982: Miami (OH) (QB/WR)
- 1983–1986: Wake Forest (RB)
- 1987–1988: Syracuse (RB)
- 1989: Tennessee (QB)
- 1990–1997: Cornell
- 1998–1999: North Carolina (QB)
- 2000: Syracuse (QB)
- 2001–2005: Buffalo
- 2008: Bowling Green (QB)
- 2009–2012: Delaware (OC/QB)
- 2013–2015: Nevada (AHC/WR)
- 2016–2017: Iowa State (PGC/QB)
- 2019: Atlanta Legends (QB/WR)

Head coaching record
- Overall: 53–84

Accomplishments and honors

Championships
- 1 Ivy (1990)

James Hofher (born October 12, 1957) is an American college football coach and former player. He served as the head football coach at Cornell University from 1990 to 1997 and at the University at Buffalo from 2001 to 2005, compiling a career college football head coaching record of 53–84. Hofher was the quarterbacks and wide receivers coach of the Atlanta Legends of the Alliance of American Football (AAF) in 2019.

== Coaching career ==
Hofher's coaching career began in 1981 as the quarterbacks and wide receivers coach at Miami of Ohio. Since then he's held offensive assistant coaching positions at Wake Forest, Syracuse, Tennessee, North Carolina and Bowling Green. He was the head coach at Cornell from 1990 to 1997 and at Buffalo from 2001 to 2005. In 1998, Hofher resigned at Cornell to join the staff at North Carolina. Hofher spent one year as quarterbacks coach for at Bowling Green State University in 2008 under head coach Gregg Brandon. He was hired in 2009 by Delaware to serve as their offensive coordinator and quarterbacks coach. During the 2011 off-season, Hofher was considered a candidate by Boston College for the offensive coordinator position, but was not hired. After four seasons with the Blue Hens, Hofher was released on November 18, 2012, after the team posted a 5−6 record in 2012. From 2016 to 2017, he served as the passing game coordinator and quarterbacks coach at the Iowa State University.

== Head coaching record ==
Year	Team	Overall	Conference	Standing	Bowl/playoffs
Cornell Big Red (Ivy League) (1990–1997)
1990	Cornell	7–3	6–1	T–1st	
1991	Cornell	5–5	4–3	T–3rd	
1992	Cornell	7–3	4–3	4th	
1993	Cornell	4–6	3–4	T–4th	
1994	Cornell	6–4	3–4	T–4th	
1995	Cornell	6–4	5–2	T–2nd	
1996	Cornell	4–6	4–3	T–3rd	
1997	Cornell	6–4	4–3	T–3rd	
Cornell:		45–35	33–23		
Buffalo Bulls (Mid-American Conference) (2001–2005)
2001	Buffalo	3–8	1–7	T–6th (East)	
2002	Buffalo	1–11	0–8	7th (East)	
2003	Buffalo	1–11	1–7	T–6th (East)	
2004	Buffalo	2–9	2–6	T–5th (East)	
2005	Buffalo	1–10	1–7	5th (East)	
Buffalo:		8–49	5–35		
Total:		53–84			
National championship Conference title Conference division title or championship game berth
