= 1997 Colgate Red Raiders football team =

American college football season

1997 Colgate Red Raiders football

Patriot League champion

NCAA Division I-AA First Round, L 28–49 vs. Villanova
- Conference: Patriot League
- Record: 7–5 (6–0 Patriot)
- Head coach: Dick Biddle (2nd season)
- Captains: Tim Girard; Blair Hicks; Dan Rivera
- Home stadium: Andy Kerr Stadium

1997 Patriot League football standings
	Conf.			Overall
Team	W		L	W		L
Colgate $^	6	–	0	7	–	5
No. 24 Bucknell	5	–	1	10	–	1
Fordham	4	–	2	5	–	6
Holy Cross	2	–	4	4	–	7
Lehigh	2	–	4	4	–	7
Lafayette	2	–	4	3	–	8
Towson	0	–	6	2	–	8
$ – Conference champion; ^ – NCAA Division I-AA playoff participant; Rankings from The Sports Network poll

The 1997 Colgate Red Raiders football team was an American football team that represented Colgate University during the 1997 NCAA Division I-AA football season. Colgate won the Patriot League championship.

In its second season under head coach Dick Biddle, the team compiled a 7–5 record. Tim Girard, Blair Hicks and Dan Rivera were the team captains.

The Red Raiders outscored opponents 414 to 300. Colgate was undefeated in league play to win its first conference championship. Because of the addition of Towson University to the league schedule, Colgate became the first Patriot League member to win six conference games in a year.

The team played its home games at Andy Kerr Stadium in Hamilton, New York.

== Schedule ==
Date	Opponent	Site	Result	Attendance	Source
September 6	at Richmond*	Andy Kerr Stadium; Hamilton, NY	L 7–23	5,000	
September 20	Fordham	Andy Kerr Stadium; Hamilton, NY	W 27–14	7,000	
September 27	at Cornell*	Schoellkopf Field; Ithaca, NY (rivalry)	W 44–38 ^{OT}	11,700	
October 4	Lehigh	Andy Kerr Stadium; Hamilton, NY	W 61–28	6,000	
October 11	at Lafayette	Fisher Field; Easton, PA	W 44–6	3,098	
October 18	Princeton*	Andy Kerr Stadium; Hamilton, NY	L 28–31		
October 25	at Army*	Michie Stadium; West Point, NY	L 27–35	39,351	
November 1	at Holy Cross	Fitton Field; Worcester, MA	W 42–7	2,826	
November 8	Towson	Andy Kerr Stadium; Hamilton, NY	W 34–3	2,000	
November 15	at Navy*	Navy–Marine Corps Memorial Stadium; Annapolis, MD	L 24–52	21,038	
November 22	No. 24 Bucknell	Andy Kerr Stadium; Hamilton, NY	W 48–14	6,000	
November 29	at Villanova*	Villanova Stadium; Villanova, PA (NCAA Division I-AA First Round)	L 28–49	8,875	
*Non-conference game; Rankings from The Sports Network Poll released prior to the game
