= 1997 Robert Morris Colonials football team =

American college football season

1997 Robert Morris Colonials football

NEC champion ECAC Bowl champion

ECAC Bowl, W 35–13 vs. Georgetown
- Conference: Northeast Conference
- Record: 8–3 (4–0 NEC)
- Head coach: Joe Walton (4th season)
- Defensive coordinator: Dan Radakovich (3rd season)
- Home stadium: Moon Stadium

1997 Northeast Conference football standings
	Conf.			Overall
Team	W		L	W		L
Robert Morris $	4	–	0	8	–	3
Monmouth	3	–	1	5	–	4
Wagner	2	–	2	6	–	4
Central Connecticut State	1	–	3	5	–	5
Saint Francis (PA)	0	–	4	2	–	9
$ – Conference champion

The 1997 Robert Morris Colonials football team represented Robert Morris College, now Robert Morris University, as a member of the Northeast Conference (NEC) during the 1997 NCAA Division I-AA football season. The Colonials were led by 4th-year head coach Joe Walton and played their home games at Moon Stadium on the campus of Moon Area High School. The Colonials finished the 1997 season with their second consecutive NEC championship and their second consecutive ECAC Bowl title.

== Schedule ==
Date	Opponent	Site	Result	Attendance
September 6	Buffalo State*	Moon Stadium; Moon Township, PA	W 35–23	1,856
September 13	at Butler*	Butler Bowl; Indianapolis, IN	W 26–21	3,410
September 20	Dayton*	Moon Stadium; Moon Township, PA	L 13–16	2,336
September 27	at Central Connecticut State	Arute Field; New Britain, CT	W 44–21	860
October 4	Wagner	Moon Stadium; Moon Township, PA	W 21–9	3,448
October 18	at Towson*	Minnegan Stadium; Towson, MD	L 30–33	3,525
October 25	at Monmouth	Kessler Field; West Long Branch, NJ	W 41–20	2,311
November 1	Mercyhurst*	Moon Stadium; Moon Township, PA	L 10–17	921
November 8	Saint Francis	Moon Stadium; Moon Township, PA	W 34–7	1,555
November 15	at Gannon*	Erie Veterans Memorial Stadium; Erie, PA	W 17–13	500
November 22	at Georgetown*	Kehoe Field; Washington, D.C. (ECAC Bowl)	W 35–13	931
*Non-conference game
