= 1997 Wagner Seahawks football team =

American college football season

1997 Wagner Seahawks football
- Conference: Northeast Conference
- Record: 6–4 (2–2 NEC)
- Head coach: Walt Hameline (17th season)
- Home stadium: Wagner College Stadium

1997 Northeast Conference football standings
	Conf.			Overall
Team	W		L	W		L
Robert Morris $	4	–	0	8	–	3
Monmouth	3	–	1	5	–	4
Wagner	2	–	2	6	–	4
Central Connecticut State	1	–	3	5	–	5
Saint Francis (PA)	0	–	4	2	–	9
$ – Conference champion

The 1997 Wagner Seahawks football team represented Wagner College in the 1997 NCAA Division I-AA football season as a member of the Northeast Conference (NEC). The Seahawks were led by 17th-year head coach Walt Hameline and played their home games at Wagner College Stadium. Wagner finished the season 6–4 overall and 2–2 in NEC play to place third.

== Schedule ==
Date	Opponent	Site	Result	Attendance	Source
September 13	Iona*	Wagner College Stadium; Staten Island, NY	W 33–0		
September 20	C.W. Post*	Wagner College Stadium; Staten Island, NY	W 13–12		
September 27	Saint Francis (PA)	Wagner College Stadium; Staten Island, NY	W 42–6		
October 4	at Robert Morris	Moon Stadium; Moon Township, PA	L 9–21	3,448	
October 11	at Saint Peter's*	Cochrane Stadium; Jersey City, NJ	W 42–14		
October 18	Central Connecticut State	Wagner College Stadium; Staten Island, NY	W 34–23		
October 25	at Marist*	Leonidoff Field; Poughkeepsie, NY	L 0–21		
November 1	Stony Brook*	Wagner College Stadium; Staten Island, NY	W 10–0	620	
November 8	at Monmouth	Kessler Field; West Long Branch, NJ	L 7–51		
November 15	at San Diego*	Torero Stadium; San Diego, CA	L 29–52		
*Non-conference game
