= 1997 Illinois State Redbirds football team =

American college football season

1997 Illinois State Redbirds football
- Conference: Gateway Football Conference
- Record: 2–9 (0–6 GFC)
- Head coach: Todd Berry (2nd season)
- Home stadium: Hancock Stadium

1997 Gateway Football Conference standings
	Conf.			Overall
Team	W		L	W		L
No. 2 Western Illinois $^	6	–	0	11	–	2
Northern Iowa	5	–	1	7	–	4
No. 4 Youngstown State ^	4	–	2	13	–	2
Southwest Missouri State	3	–	3	5	–	6
Indiana State	2	–	4	3	–	8
Southern Illinois	1	–	5	3	–	8
Illinois State	0	–	6	2	–	9
$ – Conference champion; ^ – NCAA Division I-AA playoff participant; Rankings from The Sports Network poll

The 1997 Illinois State Redbirds football team represented Illinois State University as a member of the Gateway Football Conference (GFC) during the 1997 NCAA Division I-AA football season. In their second year under head coach Todd Berry, the Redbirds compiled an overall record of 2–9, with a mark of 0–6 in conference play, and finished seventh in the GFC. Illinois State played home games at Hancock Stadium in Normal, Illinois.

== Schedule ==
Date	Opponent	Site	Result	Attendance	Source
August 30	at Southern Utah*	Eccles Coliseum; Cedar City, UT	L 13–44		
September 6	Buffalo*	Hancock Stadium; Normal, IL	W 40–28	8,262	
September 13	at Southeast Missouri State*	Houck Stadium; Cape Girardeau, MO	W 41–7	5,143	
September 20	No. 19 Eastern Illinois*	Hancock Stadium; Normal, IL (rivalry)	L 14–25	9,142	
September 27	at UNLV*	Sam Boyd Stadium; Whitney, NV	L 6–41	20,556	
October 4	No. 23 Northern Iowa	Hancock Stadium; Normal, IL	L 34–50		
October 11	at Southern Illinois	McAndrew Stadium; Carbondale, IL	L 29–31	3,000	
October 18	at Southwest Missouri State	Plaster Sports Complex; Springfield, MO	L 7–41	9,003	
October 25	Indiana State	Hancock Stadium; Normal, IL	L 13–16 ^{2OT}		
November 1	at No. 4 Youngstown State	Stambaugh Stadium; Youngstown, OH	L 0–13	13,363	
November 8	No. 2 Western Illinois	Hancock Stadium; Normal, IL	L 23–37	6,512	
*Non-conference game; Rankings from The Sports Network Poll released prior to the game
