= 1997 Harvard Crimson football team =

American college football season

1997 Harvard Crimson football

Ivy League champion
- Conference: Ivy League
- Record: 9–1 (7–0 Ivy)
- Head coach: Tim Murphy (4th season)
- Co-offensive coordinators: Jay Mills (2nd season); Joe Philbin (1st season)
- Offensive scheme: Multiple
- Defensive coordinator: Mark Harriman (4th season)
- Home stadium: Harvard Stadium

1997 Ivy League football standings
	Conf.			Overall
Team	W		L	W		L
Harvard $	7	–	0	9	–	1
Dartmouth	6	–	1	8	–	2
Brown	4	–	3	7	–	3
Cornell	4	–	3	6	–	4
Princeton	3	–	4	6	–	4
Columbia	3	–	4	4	–	6
Yale	1	–	6	2	–	8
Penn *	0	–	7	1	–	9
$ – Conference champion; * Standings reflect Penn's forfeit of five conference wins due to use of an ineligible player

The 1997 Harvard Crimson football team represented Harvard University in the 1997 NCAA Division I-AA football season. Harvard finished the season with an overall record of 9–1, winning the Ivy league with a conference mark of 7–0, the first time Harvard had ever gone unbeaten and untied in Ivy League play.

== Schedule ==
Date	Opponent	Site	Result	Attendance	Source
September 20	Columbia	Harvard Stadium; Boston, MA	W 45–7	7,658	
September 27	at Lehigh*	Goodman Stadium; Bethlehem, PA	W 35–30	11,107	
October 4	at Bucknell*	Christy Mathewson–Memorial Stadium; Lewisburg, PA	L 20–24	4,330	
October 11	at Cornell	Schoellkopf Field; Ithaca, NY	W 34–9	5,287	
October 18	Holy Cross*	Harvard Stadium; Boston, MA	W 52–24	7,094	
October 25	Princeton	Harvard Stadium; Boston, MA (rivalry)	W 14–12	8,480	
November 1	at Dartmouth	Memorial Field; Hanover, NH (rivalry)	W 24–0	13,111	
November 8	at Brown	Brown Stadium; Providence, RI	W 27–10	3,188	
November 15	Penn	Harvard Stadium; Boston, MA (rivalry)	W 33–0	5,452	
November 22	Yale	Yale Bowl; New Haven, CT (The Game)	W 17–7	26,064	
*Non-conference game
