= 1997 Northern Iowa Panthers football team =

American college football season

1997 Northern Iowa Panthers football
- Conference: Gateway Football Conference
- Record: 7–4 (5–1 Gateway)
- Head coach: Mike Dunbar (1st season)
- Home stadium: UNI-Dome

1997 Gateway Football Conference standings
| | Conf. | | | Overall |
| Team | W | | L | W | | L |
|---|---|---|---|---|---|---|
| No. 2 Western Illinois $^ | 6 | – | 0 | 11 | – | 2 |
| Northern Iowa | 5 | – | 1 | 7 | – | 4 |
| No. 4 Youngstown State ^ | 4 | – | 2 | 13 | – | 2 |
| Southwest Missouri State | 3 | – | 3 | 5 | – | 6 |
| Indiana State | 2 | – | 4 | 3 | – | 8 |
| Southern Illinois | 1 | – | 5 | 3 | – | 8 |
| Illinois State | 0 | – | 6 | 2 | – | 9 |
$ – Conference champion; ^ – NCAA Division I-AA playoff participant; Rankings from The Sports Network poll

The 1997 Northern Iowa Panthers football team was an American football team that represented the University of Northern Iowa as a member of the Gateway Football Conference (Gateway Conference) during the 1997 NCAA Division I-AA football season. In its first year under head coach Mike Dunbar, the team compiled a 7–4 record (5–1 in conference games), were outscored opponents by a total of 339 to 308, and finished second in the Gateway Conference. The Panthers' 66–0 loss to Iowa was the program's worst defeat since 1915.

Five Northern Iowa players received first-team honors on the 1997 all-Gateway Conference football team: wide receiver Mike Furrey; defensive lineman Erik Nelson; offensive lineman Andy Pattee; linebacker Matt Pedersen; and defensive back Tyree Talton. Five others were named to the second team. Furrey tallied 82 receptions for 1,291 yards and gained an average of 16.22 yards on nine punt returns. Quarterback Shane Fortney completed 180 of 349 passes and led the team with an average of 241.4 yards of total offense (232.5 passing yards) per game.

The team played its home games at the UNI-Dome in Cedar Falls, Iowa.

== Schedule ==
| Date | Opponent | Rank | Site | Result | Attendance | Source |
|---|---|---|---|---|---|---|
| September 6 | at No. 20 (I-A) Iowa* | No. 4 | Kinnick Stadium; Iowa City, IA | L 0–66 | 66,325 | |
| September 13 | Mankato State* | No. 13 | UNI-Dome; Cedar Falls, IA | W 39–15 | | |
| September 20 | at No. 16 McNeese State* | No. 12 | Cowboy Stadium; Lake Charles, LA | L 5–22 | 11,627 | |
| September 27 | Southern Illinois | No. 23 | UNI-Dome; Cedar Falls, IA | W 28–27 | 12,829 | |
| October 4 | at Illinois State | No. 23 | Hancock Stadium; Normal, IL | W 50–34 | | |
| October 11 | at No. 5 Western Illinois | No. 17 | Hanson Field; Macomb, IL | L 22–29 ^{2OT} | 13,446 | |
| October 18 | No. 1 Youngstown State | No. 24 | UNI-Dome; Cedar Falls, IA | W 35–32 | 12,218 | |
| October 25 | at Cal Poly* | No. 17 | Mustang Stadium; San Luis Obispo, CA | L 24–38 | 8,427 | |
| November 1 | at Southwest Missouri State | | Plaster Sports Complex; Springfield, MO | W 23–22 | | |
| November 8 | Southern Utah* | | UNI-Dome; Cedar Falls, IA | W 53–33 | | |
| November 15 | Indiana State | | UNI-Dome; Cedar Falls, IA | W 29–21 ^{3OT} | | |
*Non-conference game; Rankings from The Sports Network Poll released prior to the game
