= 1997 Lehigh Mountain Hawks football team =

American college football season

1997 Lehigh Mountain Hawks football
- Conference: Patriot League
- Record: 4–7 (2–4 Patriot)
- Head coach: Kevin Higgins (4th season)
- Offensive coordinator: Andy Coen (2nd season)
- Captains: Rabih Abdullah; Nate Kmieciak; Caleb Moyer
- Home stadium: Goodman Stadium

1997 Patriot League football standings
	Conf.			Overall
Team	W		L	W		L
Colgate $^	6	–	0	7	–	5
No. 24 Bucknell	5	–	1	10	–	1
Fordham	4	–	2	5	–	6
Holy Cross	2	–	4	4	–	7
Lehigh	2	–	4	4	–	7
Lafayette	2	–	4	3	–	8
Towson	0	–	6	2	–	8
$ – Conference champion; ^ – NCAA Division I-AA playoff participant; Rankings from The Sports Network poll

The 1997 Lehigh Mountain Hawks football team was an American football team that represented Lehigh University during the 1997 NCAA Division I-AA football season. Lehigh tied for second-to-last in the Patriot League.

In their fourth year under head coach Kevin Higgins, the Mountain Hawks compiled a 4–7 record. Rabih Abdullah, Caleb Moyer and Nate Kmieciak were the team captains.

The Mountain Hawks were outscored 326 to 307. Lehigh's 2–4 conference record placed it in a three-way tie for fourth in the seven-team Patriot League standings.

Lehigh played its home games at Goodman Stadium on the university's Goodman Campus in Bethlehem, Pennsylvania.

== Schedule ==
Date	Opponent	Site	Result	Attendance	Source
September 13	at Fordham*	Coffey Field; Bronx, NY	L 35–42 ^{OT}		
September 20	at Towson	Minnegan Stadium; Towson, MD	W 16–14	2,765	
September 27	Harvard*	Goodman Stadium; Bethlehem, PA	L 30–35	11,107	
October 4	at Colgate	Andy Kerr Stadium; Hamilton, NY	L 28–61	6,000	
October 11	Penn*	Goodman Stadium; Bethlehem, PA	W 24–7	10,111	
October 18	at Hofstra*	Hofstra Stadium; Hempstead, NY	L 38–45		
October 25	at Dartmouth*	Memorial Field; Hanover, NH	W 46–26	4,525	
November 1	at Bucknell	Christy Mathewson–Memorial Stadium; Lewisburg, PA	L 14–21	3,074	
November 8	Holy Cross	Goodman Stadium; Bethlehem, PA	L 14–20	4,865	
November 15	No. 3 Delaware*	Goodman Stadium; Bethlehem, PA (rivalry)	L 19–24	7,122	
November 22	Lafayette	Goodman Stadium; Bethlehem, PA (The Rivalry)	W 43–31	14,393	
*Non-conference game; Rankings from The Sports Network Poll released prior to the game
