= 1997 Western Kentucky Hilltoppers football team =

American college football season

1997 Western Kentucky Hilltoppers football

NCAA Division I-AA Quarterfinal, L 21–38 at Eastern Washington
- Conference: Independent

Ranking
- Sports Network: No. 5
- Record: 10–2
- Head coach: Jack Harbaugh (9th season)
- Home stadium: L. T. Smith Stadium

1997 NCAA Division I-AA independents football standings
	Conf.			Overall
Team	W		L	W		L
No. 18 Cal Poly		–		10	–	1
No. 5 Western Kentucky ^		–		10	–	2
No. 17 Hofstra ^		–		9	–	2
No. 25 Liberty		–		9	–	2
Samford		–		7	–	4
Morehead State		–		5	–	4
South Florida		–		5	–	6
Southern Utah		–		5	–	6
Saint Mary's		–		4	–	6
Davidson		–		3	–	8
Buffalo		–		2	–	9
La Salle		–		1	–	8
Charleston Southern		–		1	–	9
Austin Peay		–		0	–	10
^ – NCAA Division I-AA playoff participant; Rankings from The Sports Network poll

The 1997 Western Kentucky Hilltoppers football team represented Western Kentucky University in the 1997 NCAA Division I-AA football season and were led by quarterback Willie Taggart and head coach Jack Harbaugh. The team was an independent and earned their first NCAA Division I-AA Playoff berth since 1988, making it to the quarterfinals. The Hilltoppers primarily ran an option offense and were ranked 1st in Rush Offence for NCAA Division I-AA. They finished the season ranked 5th in final I-AA postseason national poll.

Western Kentucky's roster included future NFL players Rod “He Hate Me” Smart and Ben Wittman. Patrick Goodman and Andy Hape were named to All-America teams, while Harbaugh was Division I-AA Independents and AFCA Region 3 Coach of the Year. The I-AA Independent All-Star Team included Goodman, Bryan Heyward, Joey Stockton, Hape, Ron Kelly, and Taggart.

== Schedule ==
Date	Time	Opponent	Rank	Site	Result	Attendance	Source
August 28		at Tennessee–Martin	No. 10	Graham Stadium; Martin, TN	W 42–0	7,796	
September 6		No. 12 Murray State	No. 11	L. T. Smith Stadium; Bowling Green, KY (Battle for the Red Belt)	W 52–50 ^{3OT}	15,400	
September 13		at Eastern Kentucky	No. 9	Roy Kidd Stadium; Richmond, KY (Battle of the Bluegrass)	W 37–21	18,600	
September 20		Austin Peay	No. 6	L. T. Smith Stadium; Bowling Green, KY	W 53–7	7,000	
September 27	7:00 p.m.	South Florida	No. 3	L. T. Smith Stadium; Bowling Green, KY	W 31–3	11,200	
October 4	7:00 p.m.	at UAB	No. 3	Legion Field; Birmingham, AL	L 16–20	17,385	
October 18		No. 3 (DII) New Haven	No. 7	L. T. Smith Stadium; Bowling Green, KY	W 24–21	9,300	
October 25		at Southern Illinois	No. 7	McAndrew Stadium; Carbondale, IL	W 52–31	3,000	
November 1		Morehead State^{†}	No. 5	L. T. Smith Stadium; Bowling Green, KY	W 38–24	9,700	
November 8		at Indiana State	No. 5	Memorial Stadium; Terre Haute, IN	W 21–14	2,265	
November 29		No. 15 Eastern Kentucky	No. 5	L. T. Smith Stadium; Bowling Green, KY (NCAA Division I-AA First Round)	W 41–14	9,000	
December 6		at No. 4 Eastern Washington	No. 5	Joe Albi Stadium; Spokane, WA (NCAA Division I-AA Quarterfinal)	L 21–38	6,829	
^{†}Homecoming; Rankings from The Sports Network Poll released prior to the game; All times are in Central time
