= 1997 Samford Bulldogs football team =

American college football season

1997 Samford Bulldogs football
- Conference: Independent
- Record: 7–4
- Head coach: Pete Hurt (4th season)
- Offensive coordinator: Roger Carr (4th season)
- Defensive coordinator: Pete Hurt (5th season)
- Home stadium: Seibert Stadium

1997 NCAA Division I-AA independents football standings
	Conf.			Overall
Team	W		L	W		L
No. 18 Cal Poly		–		10	–	1
No. 5 Western Kentucky ^		–		10	–	2
No. 17 Hofstra ^		–		9	–	2
No. 25 Liberty		–		9	–	2
Samford		–		7	–	4
Morehead State		–		5	–	4
South Florida		–		5	–	6
Southern Utah		–		5	–	6
Saint Mary's		–		4	–	6
Davidson		–		3	–	8
Buffalo		–		2	–	9
La Salle		–		1	–	8
Charleston Southern		–		1	–	9
Austin Peay		–		0	–	10
^ – NCAA Division I-AA playoff participant; Rankings from The Sports Network poll

The 1997 Samford Bulldogs football team represented Samford University as an independent during the 1997 NCAA Division I-AA football season. Led by fourth-year head coach Pete Hurt, the Bulldogs compiled an overall record of 7–4. The team played home games at Seibert Stadium in Homewood, Alabama.

== Schedule ==
Date	Time	Opponent	Site	Result	Attendance	Source
September 4		No. 13 Furman	Seibert Stadium; Homewood, AL	L 10–29	4,763	
September 13		at Austin Peay	Governors Stadium; Clarksville, TN	W 21–13	3,826	
September 21		Tennessee Tech	Seibert Stadium; Homewood, AL	L 7–14	6,165	
September 27		at Alcorn State	Jack Spinks Stadium; Lorman, MS	W 21–16		
October 4		at No. 24 Nicholls State	John L. Guidry Stadium; Thibodaux, LA	L 14–17	6,062	
October 11	4:00 p.m.	at UCF	Florida Citrus Bowl; Orlando, FL	L 7–52	22,016	
October 25		No. 25 Troy State	Seibert Stadium; Homewood, AL	W 25–14		
November 1	1:00 p.m.	Jacksonville State	Seibert Stadium; Homewood, AL (rivalry)	W 17–14	4,040	
November 8		at Tennessee–Martin	Pacer Stadium; Martin, TN	W 14–7	1,106	
November 15		Elon^{†}	Seibert Stadium; Homewood, AL	W 46–32		
November 22		Western Carolina	Seibert Stadium; Homewood, AL	W 19–0		
^{†}Homecoming; Rankings from The Sports Network Poll released prior to the game; All times are in Central time
