= 1997 Southwest Missouri State Bears football team =

American college football season

1997 Southwest Missouri State Bears football
- Conference: Gateway Football Conference
- Record: 5–6 (3–3 GFC)
- Head coach: Del Miller (3rd season)
- Offensive coordinator: Mitch Ware (2nd season)
- Co-defensive coordinators: J. C. Harper (1st season); Bob Boyce (1st season)
- Captains: Corey Brunsvold; Brad Duke; Jeremy Hoog; Jake Jacobsmeyer; Brad Kubik; Jason Whittle
- Home stadium: Plaster Sports Complex

1997 Gateway Football Conference standings
	Conf.			Overall
Team	W		L	W		L
No. 2 Western Illinois $^	6	–	0	11	–	2
Northern Iowa	5	–	1	7	–	4
No. 4 Youngstown State ^	4	–	2	13	–	2
Southwest Missouri State	3	–	3	5	–	6
Indiana State	2	–	4	3	–	8
Southern Illinois	1	–	5	3	–	8
Illinois State	0	–	6	2	–	9
$ – Conference champion; ^ – NCAA Division I-AA playoff participant; Rankings from The Sports Network poll

The 1997 Southwest Missouri State Bears football team represented Southwest Missouri State University (now known as Missouri State University) as a member of the Gateway Football Conference (GFC) during the 1997 NCAA Division I-AA football season. Led by third-year head coach Del Miller, the Bears compiled an overall record of 5–6, with a mark of 3–3 in conference play, and finished fourth in the GFC.

== Schedule ==
Date	Time	Opponent	Site	Result	Attendance	Source
August 28		Pittsburg State*	Plaster Sports Complex; Springfield, MO	L 8–9	16,672	
September 6	7:00 p.m.	at Jacksonville State*	Paul Snow Stadium; Jacksonville, AL	W 47–42	14,023	
September 13		No. 20 McNeese State*	Plaster Sports Complex; Springfield, MO	L 16–28	13,385	
September 20		Tennessee–Martin*	Plaster Sports Complex; Springfield, MO	W 27–14		
October 4		at Southern Illinois	McAndrew Stadium; Carbondale, IL	W 36–35	12,200	
October 11		Indiana State	Plaster Sports Complex; Springfield, MO	W 22–7		
October 18		Illinois State	Plaster Sports Complex; Springfield, MO	W 41–7	9,003	
October 25		at No. 3 Western Illinois	Hanson Field; Macomb, IL	L 7–37	10,874	
November 1		No. 25 Northern Iowa	Plaster Sports Complex; Springfield, MO	L 22–23		
November 8		at Arkansas State*	Indian Stadium; Jonesboro, AR	L 27–35		
November 15	12:00 p.m.	at No. 4 Youngstown State	Stambaugh Stadium; Youngstown, OH	L 13–45	11,167	
*Non-conference game; Rankings from The Sports Network Poll released prior to the game; All times are in Central time
