= 1997 Towson Tigers football team =

American college football season

1997 Towson Tigers football
- Conference: Patriot League
- Record: 2–8 (0–6 Patriot)
- Head coach: Gordy Combs (6th season)
- Home stadium: Minnegan Stadium

1997 Patriot League football standings
| | Conf. | | | Overall |
| Team | W | | L | W | | L |
|---|---|---|---|---|---|---|
| Colgate $^ | 6 | – | 0 | 7 | – | 5 |
| No. 24 Bucknell | 5 | – | 1 | 10 | – | 1 |
| Fordham | 4 | – | 2 | 5 | – | 6 |
| Holy Cross | 2 | – | 4 | 4 | – | 7 |
| Lehigh | 2 | – | 4 | 4 | – | 7 |
| Lafayette | 2 | – | 4 | 3 | – | 8 |
| Towson | 0 | – | 6 | 2 | – | 8 |
$ – Conference champion; ^ – NCAA Division I-AA playoff participant; Rankings from The Sports Network poll

The 1997 Towson Tigers football team was an American football team that represented Towson University during the 1997 NCAA Division I-AA football season. In its first year of Patriot League play, Towson finished last.

For their sixth year under head coach Gordy Combs, the Tigers claim a 3–7 overall record, 1–5 in their inaugural Patriot League campaign.

The team's record book counts the season-opening Holy Cross matchup as a Towson win, though the university agreed in October 1997 to forfeit the match, as it had used an academically ineligible player in that game.

The Patriot League lists Towson's record as 2–8 overall, 0–6 in league play, the worst record in the league. Towson was outscored 233 to 126. Without the forfeit, Towson's league record would have improved to 1–5 and Holy Cross' would have dropped to 1–5, placing the Tigers and Crusaders in a tie for last place.

Towson played its home games at Minnegan Stadium on the university campus in Towson, Maryland.

== Schedule ==
| Date | Opponent | Site | Result | Attendance | Source |
|---|---|---|---|---|---|
| September 6 | Monmouth* | Minnegan Stadium; Towson, MD | W 22–21 | 1,769 | |
| September 13 | Holy Cross | Minnegan Stadium; Towson, MD | L 27–7‡ | 2,000 | |
| September 20 | Lehigh | Minnegan Stadium; Towson, MD | L 14–16 | 2,765 | |
| September 27 | at Columbia* | Wien Stadium; New York, NY | L 6–16 | 2,710 | |
| October 4 | at Penn* | Franklin Field; Philadelphia, PA | L 14–26 | 6,806 | |
| October 18 | Robert Morris* | Minnegan Stadium; Towson, MD | W 33–30 | 3,525 | |
| October 25 | at Lafayette | Fisher Field; Easton, PA | L 0–38 | 5,159 | |
| November 1 | at Fordham | Coffey Field; Bronx, NY | L 7–12 | 721 | |
| November 8 | at Colgate | Andy Kerr Stadium; Hamilton, NY | L 3–34 | 2,000 | |
| November 15 | Bucknell | Minnegan Stadium; Towson, MD | L 0–33 | 2,235 | |
*Non-conference game; ‡ Towson forfeit
