= 1997 Cal Poly Mustangs football team =

American college football season

1997 Cal Poly Mustangs football
- Conference: Independent

Ranking
- Sports Network: No. 18
- Record: 10–1
- Head coach: Larry Welsh (1st season)
- Offensive coordinator: Andy Ludwig (1st season)
- Home stadium: Mustang Stadium

1997 NCAA Division I-AA independents football standings
	Conf.			Overall
Team	W		L	W		L
No. 18 Cal Poly		–		10	–	1
No. 5 Western Kentucky ^		–		10	–	2
No. 17 Hofstra ^		–		9	–	2
No. 25 Liberty		–		9	–	2
Samford		–		7	–	4
Morehead State		–		5	–	4
South Florida		–		5	–	6
Southern Utah		–		5	–	6
Saint Mary's		–		4	–	6
Davidson		–		3	–	8
Buffalo		–		2	–	9
La Salle		–		1	–	8
Charleston Southern		–		1	–	9
Austin Peay		–		0	–	10
^ – NCAA Division I-AA playoff participant; Rankings from The Sports Network poll

The 1997 Cal Poly Mustangs football team represented California Polytechnic State University, San Luis Obispo as an independent during the 1997 NCAA Division I-AA football season. Led by first-year head coach Larry Welsh, Cal Poly compiled a record of 10–1. The team outscored its opponents 382 to 213 for the season. The Mustangs played home games at Mustang Stadium in San Luis Obispo, California.

== Schedule ==
Date	Opponent	Rank	Site	Result	Attendance	Source
September 6	at No. 7 (D-II) UC Davis		Toomey Field; Davis, CA (rivalry)	W 20–19		
September 13	Western Montana		Mustang Stadium; San Luis Obispo, CA	W 45–3		
September 20	Western New Mexico		Mustang Stadium; San Luis Obispo, CA	W 24–14		
September 27	at Saint Mary's		Saint Mary's Stadium; Moraga, CA	W 24–14		
October 4	at New Mexico State		Aggie Memorial Stadium; Las Cruces, NM	W 38–35 ^{OT}		
October 11	Simon Fraser		Mustang Stadium; San Luis Obispo, CA	W 52–12		
October 25	No. 17 Northern Iowa		Mustang Stadium; San Luis Obispo, CA	W 38–24	8,427	
November 1	at Liberty	No. 19	Williams Stadium; Lynchburg, VA	L 32–49		
November 8	at Montana State	No. 23	Reno H. Sales Stadium; Bozeman, MT	W 20–19	3,497	
November 15	No. 18 Dayton	No. 22	Mustang Stadium; San Luis Obispo, CA	W 44–24		
November 22	Sacramento State	No. 18	Mustang Stadium; San Luis Obispo, CA	W 45–0	7,214	
Rankings from The Sports Network Poll released prior to the game

== Team players in the NFL ==
The following Cal Poly Mustang players were selected in the 1998 NFL draft.

Player	Position	Round	Overall	NFL team
Kamil Loud	Wide receiver	7	238	Buffalo Bills
