= 1997 Southern Illinois Salukis football team =

American college football season

1997 Southern Illinois Salukis football
- Conference: Gateway Football Conference
- Record: 3–8 (1–5 Gateway)
- Head coach: Jan Quarless (1st season)
- Home stadium: McAndrew Stadium

1997 Gateway Football Conference standings
	Conf.			Overall
Team	W		L	W		L
No. 2 Western Illinois $^	6	–	0	11	–	2
Northern Iowa	5	–	1	7	–	4
No. 4 Youngstown State ^	4	–	2	13	–	2
Southwest Missouri State	3	–	3	5	–	6
Indiana State	2	–	4	3	–	8
Southern Illinois	1	–	5	3	–	8
Illinois State	0	–	6	2	–	9
$ – Conference champion; ^ – NCAA Division I-AA playoff participant; Rankings from The Sports Network poll

The 1997 Southern Illinois Salukis football team represented Southern Illinois University as a member of the Gateway Football Conference during the 1997 NCAA Division I-AA football season. They were led by first-year head coach Jan Quarless and played their home games at McAndrew Stadium in Carbondale, Illinois. The Salukis finished the season with a 3–8 record overall and a 1–5 record in conference play.

== Schedule ==
Date	Opponent	Site	Result	Attendance	Source
September 6	at Nicholls State*	John L. Guidry Stadium; Thibodaux, LA	L 0–33	3,348	
September 13	No. 17 Murray State*	McAndrew Stadium; Carbondale, IL	W 24–20	8,000	
September 20	at Indiana State	Memorial Stadium; Terre Haute, IN	L 14–19	3,705	
September 27	at No. 23 Northern Iowa	UNI-Dome; Cedar Falls, IA	L 27–28	12,829	
October 4	Southwest Missouri State	McAndrew Stadium; Carbondale, IL	L 35–36	12,200	
October 11	Illinois State	McAndrew Stadium; Carbondale, IL	W 31–29	3,000	
October 18	at South Florida*	Houlihan's Stadium; Tampa, FL	W 23–10	34,432	
October 25	No. 7 Western Kentucky*	McAndrew Stadium; Carbondale, IL	L 31–52	3,000	
November 1	at No. 2 Western Illinois	Hanson Field; Macomb, IL	L 26–31	5,241	
November 8	No. 4 Youngstown State	McAndrew Stadium; Carbondale, IL	L 10–34	2,000	
November 15	at Southeast Missouri State*	Houck Stadium; Cape Girardeau, MO	L 17–28	1,375	
*Non-conference game; Rankings from The Sports Network Poll released prior to the game
