= 1997 Buffalo Bulls football team =

American college football season

1997 Buffalo Bulls football
- Conference: Independent
- Record: 2–9
- Head coach: Craig Cirbus (3rd season)
- Defensive coordinator: Joe Reich (1st season)
- Captains: Keith Hansen; Anthony Swan
- Home stadium: University at Buffalo Stadium

1997 NCAA Division I-AA independents football standings
	Conf.			Overall
Team	W		L	W		L
No. 18 Cal Poly		–		10	–	1
No. 5 Western Kentucky ^		–		10	–	2
No. 17 Hofstra ^		–		9	–	2
No. 25 Liberty		–		9	–	2
Samford		–		7	–	4
Morehead State		–		5	–	4
South Florida		–		5	–	6
Southern Utah		–		5	–	6
Saint Mary's		–		4	–	6
Davidson		–		3	–	8
Buffalo		–		2	–	9
La Salle		–		1	–	8
Charleston Southern		–		1	–	9
Austin Peay		–		0	–	10
^ – NCAA Division I-AA playoff participant; Rankings from The Sports Network poll

The 1997 Buffalo Bulls football team represented the University at Buffalo as an independent during the 1997 NCAA Division I-AA football season. Led by third-year head coach Craig Cirbus, the Bulls compiled a record of 2–9. The team played home games at the University at Buffalo Stadium in Amherst, New York.

== Schedule ==
Date	Time	Opponent	Site	Result	Attendance	Source
August 30	7:00 pm	Lock Haven	University at Buffalo Stadium; Amherst, NY	W 30–7	12,050	
September 6	7:30 pm	at Illinois State	Hancock Stadium; Normal, IL	L 28–40	8,262	
September 13	4:00 pm	Delaware State	University at Buffalo Stadium; Amherst, NY	W 40–30	7,020	
September 20	7:00 pm	at Ohio	Peden Stadium; Athens, OH	L 0–50	23,336	
September 27	1:30 pm	West Chester	University at Buffalo Stadium; Amherst, NY	L 27–30	6,508	
October 4	1:30 pm	at Connecticut	Memorial Stadium; Storrs, CT	L 0–55	13,725	
October 11	1:00 pm	at No. 1 Youngstown State	Stambaugh Stadium; Youngstown, OH	L 17–52	20,519	
October 18	1:30 pm	UMass	University at Buffalo Stadium; Amherst, NY (rivalry)	L 20–26	6,052	
October 25	1:30 pm	Hofstra^{†}	University at Buffalo Stadium; Amherst, NY	L 26–37	6,353	
November 8	1:30 pm	Maine	University at Buffalo Stadium; Amherst, NY	L 13–52		
November 15	1:00 pm	at No. 1 Villanova	Villanova Stadium; Villanova, PA	L 28–42	6,831	
^{†}Homecoming; Rankings from The Sports Network Poll released prior to the game; All times are in Eastern time
