= 1997 Lafayette Leopards football team =

American college football season

1997 Lafayette Leopards football
- Conference: Patriot League
- Record: 3–8 (2–4 Patriot)
- Head coach: Bill Russo (17th season)
- Captains: Dan Bengele; Craig Hansen; Todd Stahlnecker
- Home stadium: Fisher Field

1997 Patriot League football standings
	Conf.			Overall
Team	W		L	W		L
Colgate $^	6	–	0	7	–	5
No. 24 Bucknell	5	–	1	10	–	1
Fordham	4	–	2	5	–	6
Holy Cross	2	–	4	4	–	7
Lehigh	2	–	4	4	–	7
Lafayette	2	–	4	3	–	8
Towson	0	–	6	2	–	8
$ – Conference champion; ^ – NCAA Division I-AA playoff participant; Rankings from The Sports Network poll

The 1997 Lafayette Leopards football team was an American football team that represented Lafayette College during the 1997 NCAA Division I-AA football season. Lafayette finished tied for second-to-last in the Patriot League.

In their 17th year under head coach Bill Russo, the Leopards compiled a 3–8 record. Dan Bengele, Craig Hansen and Todd Stahlnecker were the team captains.

The Leopards were outscored 314 to 236. Lafayette's 2–4 conference record placed it in a three-way tie for fourth in the seven-team Patriot League standings.

Lafayette played its home games at Fisher Field on College Hill in Easton, Pennsylvania.

== Schedule ==
Date	Opponent	Site	Result	Attendance	Source
September 6	Fordham	Fisher Field; Easton, PA	L 0–23	4,103	
September 13	at Army*	Michie Stadium; West Point, NY	L 14–41	31,363	
September 20	Bucknell	Fisher Field; Easton, PA	L 21–23	7,428	
September 27	at Brown*	Brown Stadium; Providence, RI	L 27–35	3,172	
October 4	Columbia*	Fisher Field; Easton, PA	W 31–3	3,822	
October 11	Colgate	Fisher Field; Easton, PA	L 6–44	3,098	
October 18	at Cornell*	Schoellkopf Field; Ithaca, NY	L 34–41 ^{OT}	4,812	
October 25	Towson^{†}	Fisher Field; Easton, PA	W 38–0	5,159	
November 1	New Haven*	Fisher Field; Easton, PA	L 0–38	731	
November 15	at Holy Cross	Fitton Field; Worcester, MA	W 34–23	1,105	
November 22	at Lehigh	Goodman Stadium; Bethlehem, PA (The Rivalry)	L 31–43	14,393	
*Non-conference game; ^{†}Homecoming
