= 1997 Youngstown State Penguins football team =

American college football season

1997 Youngstown State Penguins football

NCAA Division I-AA champion

NCAA Division I-AA Championship Game, W 10–9 vs. McNeese State
- Conference: Gateway Football Conference

Ranking
- Sports Network: No. 4
- Record: 13–2 (4–2 Gateway)
- Head coach: Jim Tressel (12th season)
- Home stadium: Stambaugh Stadium

1997 Gateway Football Conference standings
	Conf.			Overall
Team	W		L	W		L
No. 2 Western Illinois $^	6	–	0	11	–	2
Northern Iowa	5	–	1	7	–	4
No. 4 Youngstown State ^	4	–	2	13	–	2
Southwest Missouri State	3	–	3	5	–	6
Indiana State	2	–	4	3	–	8
Southern Illinois	1	–	5	3	–	8
Illinois State	0	–	6	2	–	9
$ – Conference champion; ^ – NCAA Division I-AA playoff participant; Rankings from The Sports Network poll

The 1997 Youngstown State Penguins football team was an American football team represented Youngstown State University in the Gateway Football Conference during the 1997 NCAA Division I-AA football season. In their 12th season under head coach Jim Tressel, the team compiled a 13–2 record (4–2 against conference opponents) and defeated McNeese State in the 1997 NCAA Division I-AA Football Championship Game. It was Youngstown State's fourth national championship in seven years.

Quarterback Demond Tidwell received the team's most valuable player award. The team's statistical leaders included Tidwell with 1,961 passing yards, Jake Andreadis with 1,057 rushing yards and 1,688 all-purpose yards, and Adrian Brown with 122 points.

== Schedule ==
Date	Time	Opponent	Rank	Site	Result	Attendance	Source
August 28	7:00 p.m.	Slippery Rock*	No. 11	Stambaugh Stadium; Youngstown, OH	W 33–9	14,107	
September 6	7:00 p.m.	Kent State*	No. 9	Stambaugh Stadium; Youngstown, OH	W 44–23	17,974	
September 20	1:00 p.m.	at Boston University*	No. 6	Nickerson Field; Boston, MA	W 28–7	2,035	
September 27	7:00 p.m.	Hofstra*	No. 2	Stambaugh Stadium; Youngstown, OH	W 27–22	16,071	
October 4	2:00 p.m.	at Indiana State	No. 2	Memorial Stadium; Terre Haute, IN	W 31–0	5,335	
October 11	1:00 p.m.	Buffalo^{†}*	No. 1	Stambaugh Stadium; Youngstown, OH	W 52–17	20,519	
October 18	1:30 p.m.	at No. 24 Northern Iowa	No. 1	UNI-Dome; Cedar Falls, IA	L 32–35	12,218	
November 1	1:00 p.m.	Illinois State	No. 4	Stambaugh Stadium; Youngstown, OH	W 13–0	13,363	
November 8	12:30 p.m.	at Southern Illinois	No. 4	McAndrew Stadium; Carbondale, IL	W 34–10	2,000	
November 15	1:00 p.m.	Southwest Missouri State	No. 4	Stambaugh Stadium; Youngstown, OH	W 45–13	11,167	
November 22	1:00 p.m.	No. 2 Western Illinois	No. 4	Stambaugh Stadium; Youngstown, OH	L 21–24	12,134	
November 29	1:00 p.m.	No. 9 Hampton*	No. 4	Stambaugh Stadium; Youngstown, OH (NCAA Division I-AA First Round)	W 28–13	12,431	
December 6	12:00 p.m.	at No. 1 Villanova*	No. 4	Villanova Stadium; Villanova, PA (NCAA Division I-AA Quarterfinal)	W 37–34	7,591	
December 13	12:30 p.m.	at No. 6 Eastern Washington*	No. 4	Joe Albi Stadium; Spokane, WA (NCAA Division I-AA Semifinal)	W 25–14	8,529	
December 20	2:00 p.m.	vs. No. 7 McNeese State*	No. 4	Finley Stadium; Chattanooga, TN (NCAA Division I-AA Championship Game)	W 10–9	14,771	
*Non-conference game; ^{†}Homecoming; Rankings from The Sports Network Poll released prior to the game; All times are in Eastern time
