= 1997 Holy Cross Crusaders football team =

American college football season

1997 Holy Cross Crusaders football
- Conference: Patriot League
- Record: 4–7 (2–4 Patriot)
- Head coach: Dan Allen (4th season)
- Defensive coordinator: Tom Quinn (2nd season)
- Captains: Dominic Blue; Jeff Laboranti
- Home stadium: Fitton Field

1997 Patriot League football standings
	Conf.			Overall
Team	W		L	W		L
Colgate $^	6	–	0	7	–	5
No. 24 Bucknell	5	–	1	10	–	1
Fordham	4	–	2	5	–	6
Holy Cross	2	–	4	4	–	7
Lehigh	2	–	4	4	–	7
Lafayette	2	–	4	3	–	8
Towson	0	–	6	2	–	8
$ – Conference champion; ^ – NCAA Division I-AA playoff participant; Rankings from The Sports Network poll

The 1997 Holy Cross Crusaders football team was an American football team that represented the College of the Holy Cross during the 1997 NCAA Division I-AA football season. Holy Cross tied for second-to-last in the Patriot League.

In their second year under head coach Dan Allen, the Crusaders compiled a 4–7 record. Dominic Blue and Jeff Laboranti were the team captains.

The Crusaders were outscored 308 to 182. Holy Cross' 2–4 conference record placed it in a three-way tie for fourth in the seven-team Patriot League standings.

The team's claimed 4–7 and 2–4 records count the season-opening Towson matchup as a Holy Cross win by forfeit, as Towson agreed in October 1997 that it had used an academically ineligible player in that game.

Holy Cross played its home games at Fitton Field on the college campus in Worcester, Massachusetts.

== Schedule ==
Date	Opponent	Site	Result	Attendance	Source
September 13	at Towson	Minnegan Stadium; Towson, MD	W 7–27‡	2,000	
September 20	Georgetown*	Fitton Field; Worcester, MA	W 25–21	5,827	
September 27	Dartmouth*	Fitton Field; Worcester, MA	L 6–35	3,000	
October 4	Princeton^{†}*	Fitton Field; Worcester, MA	L 7–21	8,542	
October 11	at Columbia*	Wien Stadium; New York, NY	W 45–16	3,335	
October 18	at Harvard*	Harvard Stadium; Boston, MA	L 24–52	7,094	
October 25	at Bucknell	Christy Mathewson–Memorial Stadium; Lewisburg, PA	L 6–18	7,872	
November 1	Colgate^	Fitton Field; Worcester, MA	L 7–42	2,826	
November 8	at Lehigh	Goodman Stadium; Bethlehem, PA	W 20–14	4,865	
November 15	Lafayette	Fitton Field; Worcester, MA	L 23–34	1,105	
November 22	Fordham	Fitton Field; Worcester, MA (rivalry)	L 12–28	725	
*Non-conference game; ^{†}Homecoming; ^ Family Weekend • ‡ Towson forfeit
