= 1997 Bucknell Bison football team =

American college football season

1997 Bucknell Bison football
- Conference: Patriot League
- Record: 10–1 (5–1 Patriot)
- Head coach: Tom Gadd (3rd season)
- Captains: Hunter Adams; Wally Hurdley; Chris Peer
- Home stadium: Christy Mathewson–Memorial Stadium

1997 Patriot League football standings
	Conf.			Overall
Team	W		L	W		L
Colgate $^	6	–	0	7	–	5
No. 24 Bucknell	5	–	1	10	–	1
Fordham	4	–	2	5	–	6
Holy Cross	2	–	4	4	–	7
Lehigh	2	–	4	4	–	7
Lafayette	2	–	4	3	–	8
Towson	0	–	6	2	–	8
$ – Conference champion; ^ – NCAA Division I-AA playoff participant; Rankings from The Sports Network poll

The 1997 Bucknell Bison football team was an American football team that represented Bucknell University during the 1997 NCAA Division I-AA football season. It finished second in the Patriot League.

Bucknell played its home games at Christy Mathewson–Memorial Stadium on the university campus in Lewisburg, Pennsylvania.

During its third year under head coach Tom Gadd, the Bison compiled a 10–1 record. Hunter Adams, Wally Hurdley and Chris Peer were the team captains.

The Bison outscored opponents 282 to 213. Bucknell's 5–1 conference record placed second in the seven-team Patriot League standings.

Undefeated through the first ten games of the season, Bucknell did not appear in the national Division I-AA top 25 until the week before its final game, when it was ranked No. 24 for that one week.

== Schedule ==
Date	Opponent	Site	Result	Attendance	Source
September 6	Duquesne*	Christy Mathewson–Memorial Stadium; Lewisburg, PA	W 23–16		
September 20	at Lafayette	Fisher Field; Easton, PA	W 23–21	7,428	
September 27	Penn^*	Christy Mathewson–Memorial Stadium; Lewisburg, PA	W 20–16	10,172	
October 4	at Harvard*	Harvard Stadium; Boston, MA	W 24–20	4,330	
October 11	at Yale*	Yale Bowl; New Haven, CT	W 25–24	11,239	
October 18	at Fordham	Coffey Field; Bronx, NY	W 36–10	3,296	
October 25	Holy Cross^{†}	Christy Mathewson–Memorial Stadium; Lewisburg, PA	W 18–6	7,872	
November 1	Lehigh	Christy Mathewson–Memorial Stadium; Lewisburg, PA	W 21–14	3,074	
November 8	at Saint Mary's (CA)*	Saint Mary's Stadium; Moraga, CA	W 45–38	1,500	
November 15	at Towson	Minnegan Stadium; Towson, MD	W 33–0	2,235	
November 22	at Colgate	Andy Kerr Stadium; Hamilton, NY	L 14–48	6,000	
*Non-conference game; ^{†}Homecoming; ^ Parents Weekend
