= 1997 NCAA Division I-AA Football Championship Game =

Youngstown-McNeese postseason game

1997 NCAA Division I-AA Football Championship
- I-AA National Championship Game
Youngstown State Penguins	McNeese State Cowboys
(12–2)	(13–1)
Gateway	Southland
10	9
Head coach: Jim Tressel	Head coach: Bobby Keasler
TSN / Seed; 4 / 8	TSN / Seed; 7 / 6
	1	2	3	4	Total
Youngstown State	0	3	0	7	10
McNeese State	3	0	6	0	9
- Date: December 20, 1997
- Season: 1997
- Stadium: Finley Stadium
- Location: Chattanooga, Tennessee
- Referee: Ron Buckner (SoCon)
- Attendance: 14,771

United States TV coverage
- Network: ESPN

The 1997 NCAA Division I-AA Football Championship Game was a postseason college football game between the Youngstown State Penguins and the McNeese State Cowboys. The game was played on December 20, 1997, and was the first I-AA title game contested at Finley Stadium, home field of the University of Tennessee at Chattanooga. The culminating game of the 1997 NCAA Division I-AA football season, it was won by Youngstown State, 10–9.

== Teams ==
The participants of the Championship Game were the finalists of the 1997 I-AA Playoffs, which began with a 16-team bracket.

=== Youngstown State Penguins ===
Youngstown State finished their regular season with a 9–2 record (4–2 in conference). Seeded eighth in the playoffs, the Penguins defeated ninth-seed Hampton, first-seed Villanova, and third-seed Eastern Washington to reach the final. This was the fifth appearance for Youngstown State in a Division I-AA championship game, having won three titles (1991, 1993, and 1994) against one loss (1992).

=== McNeese State Cowboys ===
McNeese State finished their regular season with a 10–1 record (6–1 in conference). The Cowboys, seeded sixth, defeated 11-seed Montana, second-seed Western Illinois, and fourth-seed Delaware to reach the final. This was the first appearance for McNeese State in a Division I-AA championship game.

== Game summary ==
=== Scoring summary ===
Scoring summary

Quarter	Time	Drive			Team	Scoring information	Score	
Quarter	Time	Plays	Yards	TOP	Team	Scoring information	YSU	MSU
1	5:30	10	54	4:01	MSU	22-yard field goal by Shonz LaFrenz	0	3
2	2:19	14	52	6:22	YSU	21-yard field goal by Mark Griffith	3	3
3	8:08	5	28	2:51	MSU	37-yard field goal by LaFrenz	3	6
3	0:51	9	38	4:45	MSU	46-yard field goal by LaFrenz	3	9
4	8:08	9	66	3:54	YSU	Renauld Ray 9-yard touchdown reception from Demond Tidwell, Griffith kick good	10	9
"TOP" = time of possession. For other American football terms, see Glossary of American football.							10	9

=== Game statistics ===
	1	2	3	4	Total
No. 8 Penguins	0	3	0	7	10
No. 6 Cowboys	3	0	6	0	9

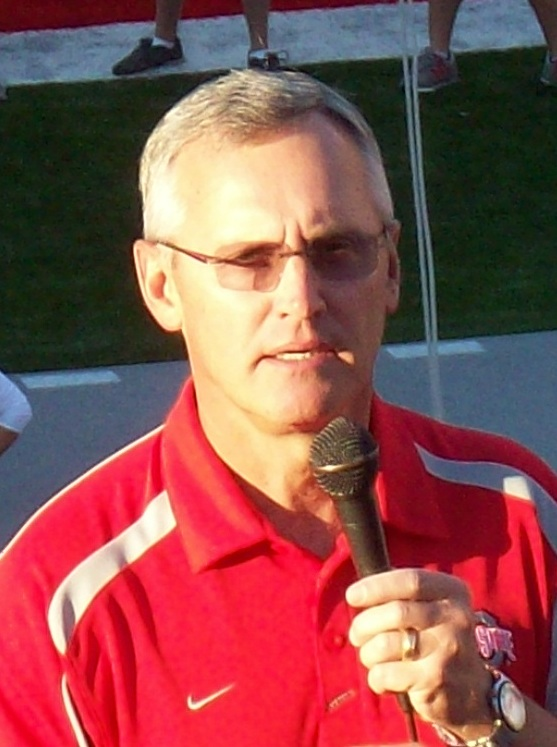
Youngstown State head coach Jim Tressel

Statistics	YSU	MSU
First downs	12	11
Plays–yards	60–200	57–201
Rushes–yards	39–73	29–58
Passing yards	127	143
Passing: comp–att–int	12–21–0	14–28–1
Time of possession	31:37	28:23

Team	Category	Player	Statistics
Youngstown State	Passing	Demond Tidwell	11–20, 110 yds, 1 TD
Youngstown State	Rushing	Jake Andreadis	16 car, 47 yds
Youngstown State	Receiving	Tim Tyrrell	4 rec, 54 yds
McNeese State	Passing	Blake Prejean	14–28, 143 yds, 1 INT
McNeese State	Rushing	William Davis	19 car, 59 yds
McNeese State	Receiving	Donnie Ashley	4 rec, 45 yds
