= 1997 Fordham Rams football team =

American college football season

1997 Fordham Rams football
- Conference: Patriot League
- Record: 5–6 (4–2 Patriot)
- Head coach: Nick Quartaro (4th season)
- Defensive coordinator: Vince Sinagra (4th season)
- Captains: Cory Bailey; Jack Pieracini; Dave Scoblick; Lance Shaw
- Home stadium: Coffey Field

1997 Patriot League football standings
	Conf.			Overall
Team	W		L	W		L
Colgate $^	6	–	0	7	–	5
No. 24 Bucknell	5	–	1	10	–	1
Fordham	4	–	2	5	–	6
Holy Cross	2	–	4	4	–	7
Lehigh	2	–	4	4	–	7
Lafayette	2	–	4	3	–	8
Towson	0	–	6	2	–	8
$ – Conference champion; ^ – NCAA Division I-AA playoff participant; Rankings from The Sports Network poll

The 1997 Fordham Rams football team was an American football team that represented Fordham University during the 1997 NCAA Division I-AA football season. Fordham finished third in the Patriot League.

In their fourth and final year under head coach Nick Quartaro, the Rams compiled a 5–6 record. Cory Bailey, Jack Pieracini, Dave Scoblick and Lance Shaw were the team captains; Bill Tierney was named an honorary captain posthumously.

The Rams were outscored 247 to 215. Their 4–2 conference record placed third in the seven-team Patriot League standings. In eight years of league play, this was Fordham's best finish to date.

Fordham played its home games at Jack Coffey Field on the university campus in The Bronx, in New York City.

== Schedule ==
Date	Opponent	Site	Result	Attendance	Source
September 6	at Lafayette	Fisher Field; Easton, PA	W 23–0	4,103	
September 13	Lehigh	Coffey Field; Bronx, NY	W 42–35		
September 20	at Colgate	Andy Kerr Stadium; Hamilton, NY	L 14–27	7,000	
September 27	vs. Princeton*	Lions Field; Ewing, NJ	L 7–9	4,050	
October 4	Brown*	Coffey Field; Bronx, NY	L 14–45	6,171	
October 11	Dartmouth*	Coffey Field; Bronx, NY	L 10–31	3,711	
October 18	Bucknell	Coffey Field; Bronx, NY	L 10–36	3,296	
October 25	Cornell*	Coffey Field; Bronx, NY	L 13–45	878	
November 1	Towson	Coffey Field; Bronx, NY	W 12–7	721	
November 15	at Georgetown*	Kehoe Field; Washington, DC	W 42–0	942	
November 22	at Holy Cross*	Fitton Field; Worcester, MA (rivalry)	W 28–12	725	
*Non-conference game
