= 1997 Indiana State Sycamores football team =

American college football season

1997 Indiana State Sycamores football
- Conference: Gateway Football Conference
- Record: 3–8 (2–3 Gateway)
- Head coach: Dennis Raetz (18th season)
- Home stadium: Memorial Stadium

1997 Gateway Football Conference standings
	Conf.			Overall
Team	W		L	W		L
No. 2 Western Illinois $^	6	–	0	11	–	2
Northern Iowa	5	–	1	7	–	4
No. 4 Youngstown State ^	4	–	2	13	–	2
Southwest Missouri State	3	–	3	5	–	6
Indiana State	2	–	4	3	–	8
Southern Illinois	1	–	5	3	–	8
Illinois State	0	–	6	2	–	9
$ – Conference champion; ^ – NCAA Division I-AA playoff participant; Rankings from The Sports Network poll

The 1997 Indiana State Sycamores football team represented Indiana State University as a member of the Gateway Football Conference during the 1997 NCAA Division I-AA football season. Led by 18th-year coach Dennis Raetz, the Sycamores compiled an overall record of 3–8 with a mark of 2–3 in conference play, and finished fifth in the Gateway. Indiana State played home games at Memorial Stadium in Terre Haute, Indiana.

== Schedule ==
Date	Opponent	Site	Result	Attendance	Source
August 28	at Murray State*	Roy Stewart Stadium; Murray, KY	L 0–13	4,593	
September 6	Kentucky State*	Memorial Stadium; Terre Haute, IN	W 19–6		
September 13	at North Texas*	Fouts Field; Denton, TX	L 6–41		
September 20	Southern Illinois	Memorial Stadium; Terre Haute, IN	W 19–14	3,705	
October 4	No. 2 Youngstown State	Memorial Stadium; Terre Haute, IN	L 0–31	5,335	
October 11	at Southwest Missouri State	Plaster Sports Complex; Springfield, MO	L 7–22		
October 18	No. 5 Western Illinois	Memorial Stadium; Terre Haute, IN	L 3–37	2,381	
October 25	at Illinois State	Hancock Stadium; Normal, IL	W 16–13 ^{2OT}		
November 1	No. 8 Eastern Illinois*	Memorial Stadium; Terre Haute, IN	L 14–21		
November 8	No. 5 Western Kentucky*	Memorial Stadium; Terre Haute, IN	L 14–21	2,265	
November 15	at Northern Iowa	UNI-Dome; Cedar Falls, IA	L 21–29 ^{3OT}		
*Non-conference game; Rankings from The Sports Network Poll released prior to the game; Source:
