= 1997 Monmouth Hawks football team =

American college football season

1997 Monmouth Hawks football
- Conference: Northeast Conference
- Record: 5–4 (3–1 NEC)
- Head coach: Kevin Callahan (5th season)
- Offensive coordinator: Rich Skrosky (1st season)
- Offensive scheme: Multiple
- Defensive coordinator: Andy Bobik (4th season)
- Base defense: 4–3
- Home stadium: Kessler Field

1997 Northeast Conference football standings
	Conf.			Overall
Team	W		L	W		L
Robert Morris $	4	–	0	8	–	3
Monmouth	3	–	1	5	–	4
Wagner	2	–	2	6	–	4
Central Connecticut State	1	–	3	5	–	5
Saint Francis (PA)	0	–	4	2	–	9
$ – Conference champion

The 1997 Monmouth Hawks football team represented Monmouth University in the 1997 NCAA Division I-AA football season as a member of the Northeast Conference (NEC). The Hawks were led by fifth-year head coach Kevin Callahan and played their home games at Kessler Field. They finished the season 5–4 overall and 3–1 in NEC play to place second.

== Schedule ==
Date	Opponent	Site	Result	Source
September 7	at Towson*	Towson Stadium; Towson, MD	L 20–21	
September 13	at Dayton*	Welcome Stadium; Dayton, OH	L 16–51	
September 21	La Salle*	Kessler Field; West Long Branch, NJ	W 42–20	
October 5	New Haven*	Kessler Field; West Long Branch, NJ	L 3–49	
October 18	at Saint Francis (PA)	Pine Bowl; Loretto, PA	W 27–7	
October 25	Robert Morris	Kessler Field; West Long Branch, NJ	L 20–41	
November 3	at Sacred Heart*	Campus Field; Fairfield, CT	W 43–0	
November 8	Wagner	Kessler Field; West Long Branch, NJ	W 51–7	
November 15	at Central Connecticut State	Arute Field; New Britain, CT	W 31–17	
*Non-conference game
