= 1997 South Florida Bulls football team =

American college football season

1997 South Florida Bulls football
- Conference: Independent
- Record: 5–6
- Head coach: Jim Leavitt (1st season)
- Offensive coordinator: Mike Canales (1st season)
- Offensive scheme: Pro-style
- Defensive coordinator: Rick Kravitz (1st season)
- Base defense: 3–4
- Home stadium: Houlihan's Stadium

1997 NCAA Division I-AA independents football standings
	Conf.			Overall
Team	W		L	W		L
No. 18 Cal Poly		–		10	–	1
No. 5 Western Kentucky ^		–		10	–	2
No. 17 Hofstra ^		–		9	–	2
No. 25 Liberty		–		9	–	2
Samford		–		7	–	4
Morehead State		–		5	–	4
South Florida		–		5	–	6
Southern Utah		–		5	–	6
Saint Mary's		–		4	–	6
Davidson		–		3	–	8
Buffalo		–		2	–	9
La Salle		–		1	–	8
Charleston Southern		–		1	–	9
Austin Peay		–		0	–	10
^ – NCAA Division I-AA playoff participant; Rankings from The Sports Network poll

The 1997 South Florida Bulls football team represented the University of South Florida (USF) as an independent during the 1997 NCAA Division I-AA football season, and was the first team fielded by the school. Led by first-year head coach Jim Leavitt, the Bulls compiled a record of 5–6. South Florida played home games at Houlihan's Stadium in Tampa, Florida.

== Schedule ==
Date	Time	Opponent	Site	TV	Result	Attendance	Source
September 6	7:00 p.m.	Kentucky Wesleyan	Houlihan's Stadium; Tampa, FL	SCF	W 80–3	49,212	
September 13	7:00 p.m.	at The Citadel	Johnson Hagood Stadium; Charleston, SC	SCF	L 7–10	12,154	
September 20	7:00 p.m.	Drake	Houlihan's Stadium; Tampa, FL	SCF	L 22–23	33,827	
September 27	8:00 p.m.	at No. 3 Western Kentucky	L. T. Smith Stadium; Bowling Green, KY		L 3–31	11,200	
October 4	7:00 p.m.	Morehead State	Houlihan's Stadium; Tampa, FL		W 33–17	30,050	
October 11	7:00 p.m.	at Elon	Burlington Memorial Stadium; Burlington, NC		L 13–41	4,692	
October 18	7:00 p.m.	Southern Illinois^{†}	Houlihan's Stadium; Tampa, FL	SCF	L 10–23	34,432	
November 1	7:00 p.m.	Charleston Southern	Houlihan's Stadium; Tampa, FL		W 24–6	25,361	
November 8	2:30 p.m.	at Cumberland (TN)	Lindsey Donnell Stadium; Lebanon, TN		W 44–0	1,001	
November 15	7:00 p.m.	Georgia Southern	Houlihan's Stadium; Tampa, FL	SCF	L 23–24	30,470	
November 22	7:00 p.m.	Davidson	Houlihan's Stadium; Tampa, FL	SCF	W 48–32	27,919	
^{†}Homecoming; Rankings from The Sports Network Poll released prior to the game; All times are in Eastern time
