= 1997 Western Illinois Leathernecks football team =

American college football season

1997 Western Illinois Leathernecks football

Gateway champion

NCAA Division I-AA Quarterfinal, L 12–14 vs. McNeese State
- Conference: Gateway Football Conference

Ranking
- Sports Network: No. 2
- Record: 11–2 (6–0 Gateway)
- Head coach: Randy Ball (8th season)
- Home stadium: Hanson Field

1997 Gateway Football Conference standings
	Conf.			Overall
Team	W		L	W		L
No. 2 Western Illinois $^	6	–	0	11	–	2
Northern Iowa	5	–	1	7	–	4
No. 4 Youngstown State ^	4	–	2	13	–	2
Southwest Missouri State	3	–	3	5	–	6
Indiana State	2	–	4	3	–	8
Southern Illinois	1	–	5	3	–	8
Illinois State	0	–	6	2	–	9
$ – Conference champion; ^ – NCAA Division I-AA playoff participant; Rankings from The Sports Network poll

The 1997 Western Illinois Leathernecks football team represented Western Illinois University as a member of the Gateway Football Conference during the 1997 NCAA Division I-AA football season. They were led by eighth-year head coach Randy Ball and played their home games at Hanson Field. The Leathernecks finished the season with an 11–2 record overall and a 6–0 record in conference play, making them conference champions. The team received an automatic bid to the NCAA Division I-AA Football Championship playoffs, where they defeated Jackson State before losing to McNeese State in the quarterfinals.

Running back Aaron Stecker, a transfer from Wisconsin, finished the year with 1,957 rushing yards and 24 touchdowns, which ranked second and first in Division I-AA respectively. Stecker was named the Gateway Conference's offensive player of the year.

== Schedule ==
Date	Opponent	Rank	Site	Result	Attendance	Source
August 28	No. 6 Eastern Illinois*	No. 9	Hanson Field; Macomb, IL	W 41–0	6,700	
September 6	Truman State*	No. 5	Hanson Field; Macomb, IL	W 45–18	7,000	
September 13	at Alcorn State*	No. 5	Jack Spinks Stadium; Lorman, MS	W 31–17	4,121	
September 20	at Marshall*	No. 4	Marshall University Stadium; Huntington, WV	L 7–48	26,724	
October 4	at Southern Utah*	No. 9	Eccles Coliseum; Cedar City, UT	W 45–6	4,445	
October 11	No. 17 Northern Iowa	No. 5	Hanson Field; Macomb, IL	W 29–22 ^{2OT}	13,446	
October 18	at Indiana State	No. 5	Memorial Stadium; Terre Haute, IN	W 37–3	2,381	
October 25	Southwest Missouri State	No. 3	Hanson Field; Macomb, IL	W 37–7	10,874	
November 1	Southern Illinois	No. 2	Hanson Field; Macomb, IL	W 31–26	5,241	
November 8	at Illinois State	No. 2	Hancock Stadium; Normal, IL	W 37–23	6,512	
November 22	at No. 4 Youngstown State	No. 2	Stambaugh Stadium; Youngstown, OH	W 24–21	12,134	
November 29	No. 14 Jackson State*	No. 2	Hanson Field; Macomb, IL (NCAA Division I-AA First Round)	W 31–24	8,980	
December 6	No. 7 McNeese State*	No. 2	Hanson Field; Macomb, IL (NCAA Division I-AA Quarterfinal)	L 12–14	5,000	
*Non-conference game; Rankings from The Sports Network Poll released prior to the game
