= 1997 La Salle Explorers football team =

American college football season

1997 La Salle Explorers football
- Conference: Independent
- Record: 1–8
- Head coach: Bill Manlove (1st season)
- Home stadium: McCarthy Stadium

1997 NCAA Division I-AA independents football standings
	Conf.			Overall
Team	W		L	W		L
No. 18 Cal Poly		–		10	–	1
No. 5 Western Kentucky ^		–		10	–	2
No. 17 Hofstra ^		–		9	–	2
No. 25 Liberty		–		9	–	2
Samford		–		7	–	4
Morehead State		–		5	–	4
South Florida		–		5	–	6
Southern Utah		–		5	–	6
Saint Mary's		–		4	–	6
Davidson		–		3	–	8
Buffalo		–		2	–	9
La Salle		–		1	–	8
Charleston Southern		–		1	–	9
Austin Peay		–		0	–	10
^ – NCAA Division I-AA playoff participant; Rankings from The Sports Network poll

The 1997 La Salle Explorers football team was an American football team that represented La Salle University as an independent during the 1997 NCAA Division I-AA football season. In their first year under head coach Bill Manlove, the Explorers compiled a 1–8 record.

== Schedule ==
Date	Opponent	Site	Result	Source
September 6	Fairfield	McCarthy Stadium; Philadelphia, PA	L 10–34	
September 12	at Saint Peter's	Cochrane Stadium; Jersey City, NJ	W 25–16	
September 20	at Monmouth	Kessler Field; West Long Branch, NJ	L 20–42	
September 27	Delaware Valley	McCarthy Stadium; Philadelphia, PA	L 0–43	
October 4	at Bentley	Bentley Stadium; Waltham, MA	L 0–45	
October 11	Catholic University	McCarthy Stadium; Philadelphia, PA	L 21–61	
October 25	Central Connecticut State	McCarthy Stadium; Philadelphia, PA	L 14–55	
November 1	at Waynesburg	Waynesburg, PA	L 7–41	
November 15	Saint Francis (PA)	McCarthy Stadium; Philadelphia, PA	L 7–30	
