= Zack Walz =

American football player (born 1976)

No. 52
- Position: Linebacker

Personal information
- Born: February 13, 1976 (age 50); Mountain View, California, U.S.
- Listed height: 6 ft 4 in (1.93 m)
- Listed weight: 225 lb (102 kg)

Career information
- High school: Saint Francis (Mountain View)
- College: Dartmouth
- NFL draft: 1998: 6th round, 158th overall pick

Career history
- Arizona Cardinals (1998–2001)

Career NFL statistics
- Tackles: 106
- Sacks: 2
- Interceptions: 1
- Fumble recoveries: 2
- Stats at Pro Football Reference

Zachary Christian Walz (born February 13, 1976) is an American former professional football player who was a linebacker in the National Football League (NFL). He played college football for the Dartmouth Big Green and was selected in sixth round of the 1998 NFL draft and played four seasons for the Arizona Cardinals. He was named as the starting outside linebacker his second and third years before season ending injuries cut both seasons and ultimately his career, short.

Pre-draft measurables
Height	Weight	Arm length	Hand span	40-yard dash	10-yard split	20-yard split	20-yard shuttle	Vertical jump	Broad jump	Bench press
6 ft 3 7/8 in (1.93 m)	228 lb (103 kg)	32 1/4 in (0.82 m)	10 in (0.25 m)	4.79 s	1.68 s	2.78 s	4.11 s	33.5 in (0.85 m)	9 ft 8 in (2.95 m)	13 reps
All values from NFL Combine

Walz was a 3-year starter at Dartmouth College, a three-time unanimous first-team All-Ivy selection, team captain and currently sits third all time for tackles in a career with 356. He attended Saint Francis High School in Mountain View, California. He currently resides in Arizona with his wife, Annette and kids. Walz had a close relationship with Cardinals teammate and future army member Pat Tillman. They both grew up playing high school football in Northern California where they would eventually play against each other in a senior all star game. Pat and Zack were drafted one round apart in 1998. They were roommates during their time together with the Arizona Cardinals. During his rookie year, Walz didn't bring the veterans breakfast as instructed and was subsequently taped to a goal post. Tillman saw this, grabbed scissors, walked outside, and despite being told by veterans not to help, he cut Walz down. This story was the subject of commentary by Coach Dave McGinnis in “Pat Tillman: A Football Life”
