= 1997 Charleston Southern Buccaneers football team =

American college football season

1997 Charleston Southern Buccaneers football
- Conference: Independent
- Record: 1–9
- Head coach: David Dowd (7th season)
- Home stadium: Buccaneer Field

1997 NCAA Division I-AA independents football standings
	Conf.			Overall
Team	W		L	W		L
No. 18 Cal Poly		–		10	–	1
No. 5 Western Kentucky ^		–		10	–	2
No. 17 Hofstra ^		–		9	–	2
No. 25 Liberty		–		9	–	2
Samford		–		7	–	4
Morehead State		–		5	–	4
South Florida		–		5	–	6
Southern Utah		–		5	–	6
Saint Mary's		–		4	–	6
Davidson		–		3	–	8
Buffalo		–		2	–	9
La Salle		–		1	–	8
Charleston Southern		–		1	–	9
Austin Peay		–		0	–	10
^ – NCAA Division I-AA playoff participant; Rankings from The Sports Network poll

The 1997 Charleston Southern Buccaneers football team represented Charleston Southern University as an independent during the 1997 NCAA Division I-AA football season. Led by seventh-year head coach David Dowd, the Buccaneers compiled a record of 1–9. Charleston Southern played home games at Buccaneer Field in Charleston, South Carolina.

== Schedule ==
Date	Time	Opponent	Site	Result	Attendance	Source
August 28		at No. 12 East Tennessee State	Memorial Center; Johnson City, TN	L 7–30	6,671	
September 6		at South Carolina State	Oliver C. Dawson Stadium; Orangeburg, SC	L 12–13	13,626	
September 13		Presbyterian	Buccaneer Field; North Charleston, SC	L 7–16		
September 20		Tusculum	Buccaneer Field; North Charleston, SC	W 12–3		
September 27		Catawba	Buccaneer Field; North Charleston, SC	L 13–38		
October 11	7:00 pm	at Newberry	Setzler Field; Newberry, SC	L 14–48		
October 25		Liberty	Buccaneer Field; North Charleston, SC	L 14–48	2,794	
November 1	7:00 pm	at South Florida	Houlihan's Stadium; Tampa, FL	L 6–24	25,361	
November 8		at Morehead State	Jayne Stadium; Morehead, KY	L 27–55		
November 22		at Wofford	Gibbs Stadium; Spartanburg, SC	L 21–51	6,846	
Rankings from The Sports Network Poll released prior to the game; All times are in Eastern time
