= 1997 Liberty Flames football team =

American college football season

1997 Liberty Flames football
- Conference: Independent
- Record: 9–2
- Head coach: Sam Rutigliano (9th season)
- Home stadium: Williams Stadium

1997 NCAA Division I-AA independents football standings
	Conf.			Overall
Team	W		L	W		L
No. 18 Cal Poly		–		10	–	1
No. 5 Western Kentucky ^		–		10	–	2
No. 17 Hofstra ^		–		9	–	2
No. 25 Liberty		–		9	–	2
Samford		–		7	–	4
Morehead State		–		5	–	4
South Florida		–		5	–	6
Southern Utah		–		5	–	6
Saint Mary's		–		4	–	6
Davidson		–		3	–	8
Buffalo		–		2	–	9
La Salle		–		1	–	8
Charleston Southern		–		1	–	9
Austin Peay		–		0	–	10
^ – NCAA Division I-AA playoff participant; Rankings from The Sports Network poll

The 1997 Liberty Flames football team represented Liberty University as an independent during the 1997 NCAA Division I-AA football season. Led by ninth-year head coach Sam Rutigliano, the Flames compiled an overall record of 9–2.

== Schedule ==
Date	Opponent	Rank	Site	Result	Attendance	Source
September 6	Glenville State		Williams Stadium; Lynchburg, VA	W 56–7		
September 13	at Western Carolina		E. J. Whitmire Stadium; Cullowhee, NC	W 17–10		
September 27	at Delaware State		Alumni Stadium; Dover, DE	W 33–17		
October 4	Elon		Williams Stadium; Lynchburg, VA	W 41–9		
October 11	No. 25 Hampton		Williams Stadium; Lynchburg, VA	L 27–33 ^{OT}	12,431	
October 18	at Virginia Union		Hovey Field; Richmond, VA (Gold Bowl)	W 16–8		
October 25	at Charleston Southern		Buccaneer Field; North Charleston, SC	W 48–14	2,794	
November 1	No. 19 Cal Poly		Williams Stadium; Lynchburg, VA	W 49–32		
November 8	at Norfolk State		William "Dick" Price Stadium; Norfolk, VA	W 17–6		
November 15	No. 21 Hofstra	No. 20	Williams Stadium; Lynchburg, VA	L 27–40		
November 22	at No. 15 Appalachian State	No. 25	Kidd Brewer Stadium; Boone, NC	W 25–19	8,712	
Rankings from NCAA Division I-AA Football Committee Poll released prior to the game
