= 1997 NCAA Division I-AA football season =

American college football season

1997 NCAA Division I-AA season

Regular season
- Number of teams: 120
- Duration: August–November
- Payton Award: Brian Finneran (WR, Villanova)
- Buchanan Award: Chris McNeil (DE, North Carolina A&T)

Playoff
- Duration: November 29–December 20
- Championship date: December 20, 1997
- Championship site: Finley Stadium; Chattanooga, Tennessee
- Champion: Youngstown State

NCAA Division I-AA football seasons
- «1996 1998»

The 1997 NCAA Division I-AA football season, part of college football in the United States organized by the National Collegiate Athletic Association (NCAA) at the Division I-AA level, began in August 1997, and concluded with the 1997 NCAA Division I-AA Football Championship Game on December 20, 1997, at Finley Stadium in Chattanooga, Tennessee. The Youngstown State Penguins won their fourth I-AA championship, defeating the McNeese State Cowboys by a score of 10−9.

== Conference changes and new programs ==
- Prior to the 1997 season, the Atlantic 10 Conference began to sponsor football at the Division I-AA level by taking over the football-only Yankee Conference, which had been a charter member of the subdivision. All 12 members (Boston University, Connecticut, Delaware, James Madison, Maine, Massachusetts, New Hampshire, Northeastern, Rhode Island, Richmond, Villanova, and William & Mary) moved into the new conference.

School	1996 Conference	1997 Conference
Arkansas–Pine Bluff	Independent (NAIA)	SWAC (I-AA)
Austin Peay	Ohio Valley	I-AA Independent
Jacksonville State	I-AA Independent	Southland
La Salle	New Program	I-AA Independent
Marshall	Southern (I-AA)	MAC (I-A)
Norfolk State	CIAA (D-II)	MEAC (I-AA)
South Florida	New Program	I-AA Independent
Towson State	I-AA Independent	Patriot
Wofford	I-AA Independent	Southern
Youngstown State	I-AA Independent	Gateway

== Conference standings ==
1997 Atlantic 10 Conference football standings
	Conf.			Overall
Team	W		L	W		L
New England Division
New Hampshire x	5	–	3	5	–	6
Connecticut	4	–	4	7	–	4
Maine	4	–	4	5	–	6
Rhode Island	2	–	6	2	–	9
Boston University	1	–	7	1	–	10
UMass	1	–	7	2	–	9
Mid-Atlantic Division
No. 1 Villanova x$^	8	–	0	12	–	1
No. 3 Delaware ^	7	–	1	12	–	2
No. 20 Northeastern	5	–	3	8	–	3
Richmond	4	–	4	6	–	5
William & Mary	4	–	4	7	–	4
James Madison	3	–	5	5	–	6
$ – Conference champion; x – Division champion/co-champions; ^ – NCAA Division I-AA playoff participant; Rankings from The Sports Network poll

1997 Big Sky Conference football standings
	Conf.			Overall
Team	W		L	W		L
No. 6 Eastern Washington $^	7	–	1	12	–	2
No. 11 Montana ^	6	–	2	8	–	4
Montana State	5	–	3	6	–	5
Northern Arizona	4	–	4	6	–	5
Weber State	4	–	4	6	–	5
Cal State Northridge	4	–	4	4	–	8
Portland State	3	–	5	4	–	7
Idaho State	2	–	6	3	–	8
Sacramento State	1	–	7	1	–	10
$ – Conference champion; ^ – NCAA Division I-AA playoff participant; Cal State Northridge record includes two losses by forfeit; Rankings from The Sports Network poll

1997 Gateway Football Conference standings
	Conf.			Overall
Team	W		L	W		L
No. 2 Western Illinois $^	6	–	0	11	–	2
Northern Iowa	5	–	1	7	–	4
No. 4 Youngstown State ^	4	–	2	13	–	2
Southwest Missouri State	3	–	3	5	–	6
Indiana State	2	–	4	3	–	8
Southern Illinois	1	–	5	3	–	8
Illinois State	0	–	6	2	–	9
$ – Conference champion; ^ – NCAA Division I-AA playoff participant; Rankings from The Sports Network poll

1997 Ivy League football standings
	Conf.			Overall
Team	W		L	W		L
Harvard $	7	–	0	9	–	1
Dartmouth	6	–	1	8	–	2
Brown	4	–	3	7	–	3
Cornell	4	–	3	6	–	4
Princeton	3	–	4	6	–	4
Columbia	3	–	4	4	–	6
Yale	1	–	6	2	–	8
Penn *	0	–	7	1	–	9
$ – Conference champion; * Standings reflect Penn's forfeit of five conference wins due to use of an ineligible player

1997 Metro Atlantic Athletic Conference football standings
	Conf.			Overall
Team	W		L	W		L
Georgetown $	7	–	0	8	–	3
Duquesne	6	–	1	7	–	3
Fairfield	4	–	3	7	–	3
Siena	4	–	3	6	–	3
Marist	4	–	3	6	–	4
Canisius	2	–	5	3	–	7
Saint Peter's	1	–	6	1	–	9
St. John's	0	–	0	8	–	3
Iona	0	–	7	0	–	10
$ – Conference champion

1997 Mid-Eastern Athletic Conference football standings
	Conf.			Overall
Team	W		L	W		L
No. 9 Hampton $^	7	–	0	10	–	2
No. 22 South Carolina State	5	–	2	9	–	2
No. 10 Florida A&M ^	5	–	2	9	–	3
Howard	4	–	3	7	–	4
North Carolina A&T	3	–	4	7	–	4
Morgan State	2	–	5	3	–	7
Bethune–Cookman	1	–	6	4	–	7
Delaware State	1	–	6	3	–	8
Norfolk State	0	–	0	3	–	7
$ – Conference champion; ^ – NCAA Division I-AA playoff participant; Norfolk State games did not count as conference games.; Rankings from The Sports Network poll

1997 Northeast Conference football standings
	Conf.			Overall
Team	W		L	W		L
Robert Morris $	4	–	0	8	–	3
Monmouth	3	–	1	5	–	4
Wagner	2	–	2	6	–	4
Central Connecticut State	1	–	3	5	–	5
Saint Francis (PA)	0	–	4	2	–	9
$ – Conference champion

1997 Ohio Valley Conference football standings
	Conf.			Overall
Team	W		L	W		L
No. 19 Eastern Kentucky $^	7	–	0	8	–	4
No. 16 Eastern Illinois	5	–	2	8	–	3
Murray State	5	–	2	7	–	4
Tennessee Tech	4	–	3	6	–	5
Tennessee State	4	–	3	4	–	7
Middle Tennessee	2	–	5	4	–	6
Southeast Missouri State	1	–	6	4	–	7
Tennessee–Martin	0	–	7	1	–	10
$ – Conference champion; ^ – NCAA Division I-AA playoff participant; Rankings from The Sports Network poll

1997 Patriot League football standings
	Conf.			Overall
Team	W		L	W		L
Colgate $^	6	–	0	7	–	5
No. 24 Bucknell	5	–	1	10	–	1
Fordham	4	–	2	5	–	6
Holy Cross	2	–	4	4	–	7
Lehigh	2	–	4	4	–	7
Lafayette	2	–	4	3	–	8
Towson	0	–	6	2	–	8
$ – Conference champion; ^ – NCAA Division I-AA playoff participant; Rankings from The Sports Network poll

1997 Pioneer Football League standings
	Conf.			Overall
Team	W		L	W		L
No. 23 Dayton $	5	–	0	9	–	1
San Diego	4	–	1	8	–	3
Drake	2	–	3	8	–	3
Butler	2	–	3	6	–	4
Valparaiso	2	–	3	3	–	7
Evansville	0	–	5	2	–	8
$ – Conference champion; Rankings from The Sports Network poll

1997 Southern Conference football standings
	Conf.			Overall
Team	W		L	W		L
No. 8 Georgia Southern $^	7	–	1	10	–	3
No. 15 Appalachian State	6	–	2	7	–	4
East Tennessee State	5	–	3	7	–	4
Furman	5	–	3	7	–	4
The Citadel	4	–	4	6	–	5
Chattanooga	4	–	4	7	–	4
Western Carolina	3	–	5	3	–	8
Wofford	2	–	6	3	–	7
VMI	0	–	8	0	–	11
$ – Conference champion; ^ – NCAA Division I-AA playoff participant; Rankings from The Sports Network poll

1997 Southland Football League standings
	Conf.			Overall
Team	W		L	W		L
No. 7 McNeese State +^	6	–	1	13	–	2
No. 21 Northwestern State +^	6	–	1	8	–	4
No. 13 Stephen F. Austin	5	–	2	8	–	3
Sam Houston State	3	–	4	5	–	6
Nicholls State	3	–	4	5	–	6
Southwest Texas State	2	–	5	5	–	6
Troy State	2	–	5	5	–	6
Jacksonville State	1	–	6	1	–	10
+ – Conference co-champions; ^ – NCAA Division I-AA playoff participant; Rankings from The Sports Network poll

1997 Southwestern Athletic Conference football standings
	Conf.			Overall
Team	W		L	W		L
No. 12 Southern $	8	–	0	11	–	1
No. 14 Jackson State ^	7	–	1	9	–	3
Arkansas–Pine Bluff	6	–	2	8	–	3
Texas Southern	4	–	4	5	–	6
Alcorn State	4	–	4	4	–	7
Mississippi Valley State	3	–	5	4	–	6
Alabama State	2	–	6	3	–	8
Grambling State	2	–	6	3	–	8
Prairie View A&M	0	–	8	0	–	9
$ – Conference champion; ^ – NCAA Division I-AA playoff participant; Rankings from The Sports Network Poll

1997 NCAA Division I-AA independents football standings
	Conf.			Overall
Team	W		L	W		L
No. 18 Cal Poly		–		10	–	1
No. 5 Western Kentucky ^		–		10	–	2
No. 17 Hofstra ^		–		9	–	2
No. 25 Liberty		–		9	–	2
Samford		–		7	–	4
Morehead State		–		5	–	4
South Florida		–		5	–	6
Southern Utah		–		5	–	6
Saint Mary's		–		4	–	6
Davidson		–		3	–	8
Buffalo		–		2	–	9
La Salle		–		1	–	8
Charleston Southern		–		1	–	9
Austin Peay		–		0	–	10
^ – NCAA Division I-AA playoff participant; Rankings from The Sports Network poll

== Conference champions ==
Conference Champions

Atlantic 10 Conference – Villanova
Big Sky Conference – Eastern Washington
Gateway Football Conference – Western Illinois
Ivy League – Harvard
Metro Atlantic Athletic Conference – Georgetown
Mid-Eastern Athletic Conference – Hampton
Northeast Conference – Robert Morris
Ohio Valley Conference – Eastern Kentucky
Patriot League – Colgate
Pioneer Football League – Dayton
Southern Conference – Georgia Southern
Southland Football League – McNeese State and Northwestern State
Southwestern Athletic Conference – Southern

== Postseason ==
=== NCAA Division I-AA playoff bracket ===
The NCAA departed from standard bracket structure—where, for example, the fourth and fifth seeds could meet in the second round—in order to place teams from the same conference in different halves of the bracket.

First Round; November 29; Campus sites
1	Villanova*	49
16	Colgate	28
8	Youngstown State*	28
9	Hampton	13
5	Western Kentucky*	42
12	Eastern Kentucky	14
3	Eastern Washington*	40
14	Northwestern State	10
4	Delaware*	24
13	Hofstra	14
7	Georgia Southern*	52
10	Florida A&M	37
6	McNeese State*	19
11	Montana	14
2	Western Illinois*	31
15	Jackson State	24

Quarterfinals; December 6 Campus sites
1	Villanova*	34
8	Youngstown State	37
5	Western Kentucky	21
3	Eastern Washington*	38
4	Delaware*	16
7	Georgia Southern	7
6	McNeese State	14
2	Western Illinois*	12

Semifinals; December 13; Campus sites
8	Youngstown State	25
3	Eastern Washington*	14
4	Delaware*	21
6	McNeese State	23

National Championship Game; December 20; Finley Stadium; Chattanooga, TN
8	Youngstown State	10
6	McNeese State	9

* Denotes host institution
