= Mitch Marrow =

American football player (born 1975)

Mitch Marrow (born July 16, 1975) is an American football player and business owner. Marrow attended the University of Pennsylvania, where he starred for the Penn Quakers football team. He was drafted by the Carolina Panthers in the 3rd round of the draft. He ultimately retired due to back injuries. After he retired from football, Marrow became a hedge fund manager and chief executive officer of a dog daycare company.

== Biography ==
Marrow was born in Harrison, New York. He attended Brunswick High School, where he starred for his school's baseball team. He decided to pursue a career in American football. He attended the University of Pennsylvania, and played college football for the Pennsylvania Quakers football team as a defensive tackle. In 1996 and 1997, Marrow was named All-Ivy League. In his senior year, he was named a preseason All-American. He missed most of the season with mononucleosis. He returned to health and resumed playing for the Quakers. However, he withdrew from a class and did not enroll in another one, becoming a part-time student. He was retroactively declared academically ineligible, forcing the Quakers to forfeit five victories.

Marrow participated in the Senior Bowl, and drew notice from National Football League (NFL) scouts. The Carolina Panthers selected Marrow in the third round of the 1998 NFL draft. He suffered a ruptured spinal disc during training camp, and missed the season. In 1999, he suffered another back injury, which ended his football career.

After football, Marrow began acting, working with acting coach Harold Guskin. He settled into a career managing a hedge fund. After twelve years, Marrow quit working for the hedge fund to found The Spot Experience, a dog daycare center in New York City.

== Personal ==
Marrow owned a bull mastiff, who he named Butkus, after Dick Butkus. He also owns a St. Bernard, named Reggie, and a bull mastiff, named Hank.
