= Jim Fenwick (American football) =

American football coach (1952–2022)

Biographical details
- Born: c. 1952; Pocatello, Idaho, U.S.
- Died: February 17, 2022 (aged 69–70)

Playing career
- 1970–1971: Pierce
- 1972–1973: Wichita State
- Position: Tailback

Coaching career (HC unless noted)
- 1974–1975: Pierce (OC)
- 1976–1980: Pierce (DC)
- 1981–1985: Pierce
- 1986: Cal State Northridge (ST/RB)
- 1987: Los Angeles Valley (OC)
- 1988: Miami (OH) (RB)
- 1989: Miami (OH) (co-OL)
- 1990: Pacific (CA) (RB)
- 1991–1996: Los Angeles Valley
- 1997: Cal State Northridge
- 1998–1999: New Mexico (OC)
- 2000–2001: Eastern Oregon (OC)
- 2002–2003: Eastern Oregon
- 2005: Eastern Oregon
- 2006–2008: Occidental (OC)
- 2009–2012: Los Angeles Valley

Administrative career (AD unless noted)
- 2012–2020: Los Angeles Valley

Head coaching record
- Overall: 15–26 (Note: Cal State Northridge originally finished the 1997 season 6–6 but had to forfeit their wins over Boise State and Azusa Pacific due to ineligible players. Cal State Northridge is now credited with a 4–8 record.) (college); 99–57–1 (junior college)
- Bowls: 5–2 (junior college)

Accomplishments and honors

Championships
- 3 Southern California Conference (1983–1985); 2 WSC Southern Division (1995–1996)

James Fenwick (c. 1952 – February 17, 2022) was an American college football coach. He was the head football coach for Pierce College from 1981 to 1985, Los Angeles Valley College from 1991 to 1996 and 2009 and 2012, California State University, Northridge in 1997, and Eastern Oregon University from 2002 to 2003 and in 2005.

== Playing career ==
Fenwick played college football for Pierce and Wichita State as a tailback.

== Coaching career ==
In 1974, Fenwick began his coaching career as the offensive coordinator for his alma mater, Pierce. After two seasons he transitioned to the role of defensive coordinator. In 1981, he was promoted to head football coach for the Brahmas. After a 2–8 season in 1982, Fenwick briefly accepted a coaching job at El Camino College but decided to remain at Pierce. He led the Brahmas to three consecutive Southern California Conference championships from 1983 to 1985.

In 1986, he left Pierce, after compiling a record of 35–18 in five seasons, to become the special teams coordinator for Cal State Northridge. After one season, he returned to junior college to become the offensive coordinator for Los Angeles Valley. In 1988, he was hired as the running backs coach for NCAA Division I-A Miami (OH) under head coach Tim Rose. In 1989, he served as the co-offensive line coach for the RedHawks. In 1990, he joined Pacific as the running backs coach.

In 1991, Fenwick was hired as the head football coach for Los Angeles Valley. In the six seasons as head coach, he led the team to a 48–15–1 record; including three ten-win seasons. In 1997, he rejoined Cal State Northridge, this time as the head football coach. In his one season at the helm, he led the team to a 6–6 record, but had to forfeit two wins, and is now credited for a 4–8 record. After one season, he was hired as the offensive coordinator for New Mexico. During his tenure he introduced the Lobos to a West Coast offense. He served in the position for two years before taking the same position at Eastern Oregon.

In 2002, he was promoted to head coach. Before the 2004 season, Fenwick was diagnosed with leukemia and had to miss the season. He returned to coach in 2005. In three total seasons as head coach, he led the team to an 11–18 record including a winning 6–3 record in his final season and first in the transitionary period into the NAIA's Frontier Conference. He was fired four days after the conclusion of the 2005 season. In 2006, Fenwick was hired as the offensive coordinator for Occidental. In 2009, he returned for his second stint as the head football coach for Los Angeles Valley. He retired from coaching following the 2012 season.

== Later career ==
From 2012 until his retirement in 2020, Fenwick served as the athletic director for Los Angeles Valley College.

== Family, health, and death ==
Fenwick has two sons, one of which, Tyler, was the head football coach for Missouri University of Science and Technology, Southeastern Oklahoma State University, and is currently the head football coach for Missouri Western State University. In 2004, Fenwick was diagnosed with leukemia and was forced to miss the entirety of the 2004 season. He went into remission in 2004 and returned to coaching the following year. In 2020, his cancer returned and underwent two bone marrow transplants. He died on February 17, 2022.

== Head coaching record ==
=== College ===
Year	Team	Overall	Conference	Standing	Bowl/playoffs
Cal State Northridge Matadors (Big Sky Conference) (1997)
1997	Cal State Northridge	4–8	4–4	T–4th	
Cal State Northridge:		4–8	4–4		
Eastern Oregon Mountaineers (NCAA Division III independent) (2002–2003)
2002	Eastern Oregon	1–9			
2003	Eastern Oregon	4–6			
Eastern Oregon Mountaineers (Frontier Conference) (2005)
2005	Eastern Oregon	6–3	0–0	N/A (Note: Not eligible for conference standings as the team was under a probationary period while transitioning from the NCAA Division III to the NAIA's Frontier Conference.)	
Eastern Oregon:		11–18			
Total:		15–26			

=== Junior college ===
Year	Team	Overall	Conference	Standing	Bowl/playoffs
Pierce Brahmas (Metropolitan Conference) (1981–1982)
1981	Pierce	5–5	3–3	T–4th	
1982	Pierce	2–8			
Pierce Brahmas (Southern California Conference) (1981–1982)
1983	Pierce	9–2	5–1	1st	W Mission
1984	Pierce	10–1	6–0	1st	L Potato
1985	Pierce	9–2	5–0	1st	W Brahma
Pierce:		35–18			
Los Angeles Valley Monarchs (Western State Conference) (1991–1996)
1991	Los Angeles Valley	4–6	4–5 / 1–4	5th (Southern)	
1992	Los Angeles Valley	5–4–1	5–4 / 2–3	T–3rd (Southern)	
1993	Los Angeles Valley	9–2	7–2 / 3–2	2nd (Southern)	W Orange County
1994	Los Angeles Valley	10–1	9–1 / 5–1	2nd (Southern)	W Orange County
1995	Los Angeles Valley	10–1	6–0	1st (Southern)	L Strawberry
1996	Los Angeles Valley	10–1	9–1 / 6–0	1st (Southern)	W No Fear
Los Angeles Valley Monarchs (American Pacific Conference) (2009–2012)
2009	Los Angeles Valley	3–7	3–4	T–4th	
2010	Los Angeles Valley	6–4	4–2	T–2nd	
2011	Los Angeles Valley	5–5	3–3	T–3rd	
2012	Los Angeles Valley	2–8	2–5	6th	
Los Angeles Valley:		64–39–1	52–27		
Total:		99–57–1			
National championship Conference title Conference division title or championship game berth
