= Famous Idaho Potato Bowl =

NCAA-sanctioned post-season college football bowl game

- Stadium: Albertsons Stadium
- Location: Boise, Idaho, U.S.
- Operated: 1997–present
- Conference tie-ins: MWC, PAC-12
- Previous conference tie-ins: Big West (1997–2000); C-USA (1997–1999); WAC (2000–2012); ACC (2001–2008); MAC (2010–2025)
- Payout: US$800,000 (2019 season)
- Website: famousidahopotatobowl.com

Sponsors
- Humanitarian Bowl Association (1997–1998); Crucial Technology (1999–2003); MPC Computers (2004–2006); Roady's Truck Stops (2007–2009); uDrove (2010); Idaho Potato Commission (2011–present)

Former names
- Sports Humanitarian Bowl (1997); Humanitarian Bowl (1998); Crucial.com Humanitarian Bowl (1999–2003); MPC Computers Bowl (2004–2006); Roady's Humanitarian Bowl (2007–2009); uDrove Humanitarian Bowl (2010)

2025 matchup
- Utah State vs. Washington State (Washington State 34–21)

The Famous Idaho Potato Bowl, previously the Humanitarian Bowl (1997–2003, 2007–2010) and the MPC Computers Bowl (2004–2006), is an NCAA-sanctioned post-season college football bowl game that has been played annually since 1997 at Albertsons Stadium on the campus of Boise State University in Boise, Idaho. The game is televised nationally on the ESPN family of networks.

== History ==
=== Conference tie-ins ===
The Humanitarian Bowl was launched, in part, as a response to changes made to the Las Vegas Bowl’s selection process. When the bowl was launched in 1992 as the successor to the California Bowl, it inherited the bowl’s contracted matchup of the champions of the Big West Conference and the Mid-American Conference (MAC) that had been taking place since 1982. However, after the 1996 edition, the Las Vegas Bowl dropped its affiliations with the Big West and the MAC in favor of offering a bid to a team from the Western Athletic Conference (WAC), forcing the conferences to find other solutions. This resulted in two new bowl games being launched for the 1997 season, one of which was awarded to Boise and initially named the Humanitarian Bowl. The Big West, which had Boise State as a member at the time, agreed to terms to send its champion to the bowl. The MAC, meanwhile, sent its champion to the Motor City Bowl in Detroit.

Actual participants
Season(s)	Conferences	
Season(s)	Host	Opponent
1997–1999	Big West	C-USA
2000	Big West	WAC
2001	WAC	ACC
2002	WAC	Big 12
2003–2008	WAC	ACC
2009–2012	WAC	MAC
2013–2015	Mountain West	MAC
2016	Mountain West	Sun Belt
2017	Mountain West	MAC
2018	Independent	MAC
2019	Mountain West	MAC
2020	Mountain West	The American
2021	Mountain West	MAC
2022	Mountain West	MAC
2023	Mountain West	Sun Belt
2024	Mountain West	MAC

From 1997 to 1999, the Big West champion was matched with a team from Conference USA (C-USA), while in 2000 the WAC sent a representative. The Big West stopped sponsoring football after the 2000 season, and bowl organizers extended a permanent invite to the WAC to replace the Big West as host of the game, and struck an agreement with the Atlantic Coast Conference (ACC) to provide a bowl-eligible team if it had yet to fill its bowl allotment. The WAC champion received the automatic bid to the game unless that team received a better offer from another bowl game or qualified for the Bowl Championship Series (BCS).

The WAC and ACC met in the 2001 through 2008 editions of the bowl, except for 2002 when the ACC's slot was filled by Iowa State of the Big 12 Conference. In 2009, the Mountain West Conference was to provide a team, but Mountain West champion TCU was selected for the Fiesta Bowl and the conference did not have enough bowl-eligible teams to send a replacement; as a result, Bowling Green of the MAC was invited. In 2010, the bowl inherited the MAC's International Bowl tie-in after that Toronto-based bowl folded; the bowl featured a MAC vs. WAC matchup through 2012.

After the WAC stopped sponsoring football in 2012, Mountain West inherited its spot as host, reaching agreement with the bowl to provide a team, starting with the December 2013 edition. The bowl featured MAC vs. Mountain West matchups in the 2013 through 2015 games. In 2016, the bowl invited in-state Idaho of the Sun Belt Conference in place of a MAC team. The 2017 edition returned to MAC vs. Mountain West, while in the 2018 edition, independent BYU was invited in place of a Mountain West team. In late July 2019, it was announced that the Mountain West and MAC would maintain their tie-ins to the bowl through the 2025–26 football season. The December 2020 edition included the first invitation to a team from the American Athletic Conference (AAC or "The American").

=== Sponsors ===
The game originally named for the Idaho-based World Sports Humanitarian Hall of Fame. It was sponsored by Micron Technology, an Idaho-based manufacturer, from 1999 to 2002 under the name Crucial.com, which sold computer memory upgrades from Micron. The bowl game then briefly had no sponsor for the January 2004 game. In December 2004, the name was changed to the MPC Computers Bowl. MPC Computers, which is also based in Idaho, was formerly MicronPC, the computer manufacturing division of Micron, but was later split off as a separate company. In April 2007, it was announced that the bowl would again be called the Humanitarian Bowl. In May 2007, Boise-based Roady's Truck Stops was announced as the new sponsor, thus renaming the game the Roady's Humanitarian Bowl. On May 25, 2010, uDrove, a maker of applications for the transportation industry, became the sponsor of the Humanitarian Bowl, signing a four-year agreement to replace Roady's. On August 3, 2011, the Idaho Potato Commission (IPC) signed a six-year naming rights deal to sponsor the bowl, renaming it the Famous Idaho Potato Bowl. In December 2017, IPC announced that they would be sponsoring the bowl for an additional five years.

The game is the longest running cold weather bowl game currently in operation. The payout is $750,000, but teams are required to provide a corporate sponsor, purchase a minimum number of tickets, and stay at a selected hotel for a minimum stay. Because of this, 7–4 UCLA declined an invitation to the 2001 Humanitarian Bowl.

=== Highway Angel ===
From 2008 through 2012, bowl organizers, in conjunction with the Truckload Carriers Association, featured a "Highway Angel of the Year" to game attendees. Highway Angels are truck drivers who performed a heroic feat to save the life of another motorist.

Year	Honoree	Description
2008	Leonard T. Roach	Roach pulled a driver from a water-filled ditch near South Bend, Indiana, even though the wind chill factor was −20 °F (−29 °C).
2009	Michael Hunt	Hunt used his truck to push away a vehicle (and its driver) from a fiery collision near Spring Lake, North Carolina, which had already claimed the life of the other driver.
2010	Shawn L. Hubbard	While driving his truck near Diamond Bar, California, Hubbard came upon a fiery car crash in which the driver was deceased, but the passenger was still alive and trapped in the burning car. Hubbard freed the passenger and pulled him from the vehicle just moments before it was completely engulfed in flames.
2011	Marcus Beam	While driving near Benson, North Carolina, Beam observed a speeding car strike another vehicle, causing the second car to overturn and roll down an embankment. While other motorists watched without offering help, Beam freed the female driver from the wreckage, and pulled two small children from the mangled vehicle as well.
2012	Kenny Cass	While driving in Portland, Oregon, Cass witnessed a pick-up truck rear-end a 53' tractor trailer and become wedged up to its windshield under the trailer. Cass made the scene safe by placing emergency triangles on the road, freed the pick-up truck driver from his vehicle while smoke billowed from beneath the truck and tended to the driver's wounds until emergency personnel arrived 20 minutes later.

== Game results ==
No.	Date	Bowl name	Winning Team		Losing Team		Attendance
1	December 29, 1997	Humanitarian Bowl	Cincinnati	35	Utah State	19	16,289
2	December 30, 1998	Humanitarian Bowl	Idaho	42	Southern Miss	35	19,667
3	December 30, 1999	Humanitarian Bowl	Boise State	34	Louisville	31	29,283
4	December 28, 2000	Humanitarian Bowl	Boise State	38	UTEP	23	26,203
5	December 31, 2001	Humanitarian Bowl	Clemson	49	Louisiana Tech	24	25,364
6	December 31, 2002	Humanitarian Bowl	Boise State	34	Iowa State	16	30,446
7	January 3, 2004	Humanitarian Bowl	Georgia Tech	52	Tulsa	10	23,114
8	December 27, 2004	MPC Computers Bowl	Fresno State	37	Virginia	34 (OT)	28,516
9	December 28, 2005	MPC Computers Bowl	Boston College	27	Boise State	21	30,493
10	December 31, 2006	MPC Computers Bowl	Miami (FL)	21	Nevada	20	28,654
11	December 31, 2007	Humanitarian Bowl	Fresno State	40	Georgia Tech	28	27,062
12	December 30, 2008	Humanitarian Bowl	Maryland	42	Nevada	35	26,781
13	December 30, 2009	Humanitarian Bowl	Idaho	43	Bowling Green	42	26,726
14	December 18, 2010	Humanitarian Bowl	Northern Illinois	40	Fresno State	17	25,449
15	December 17, 2011	Famous Idaho Potato Bowl	Ohio	24	Utah State	23	28,076
16	December 15, 2012	Famous Idaho Potato Bowl	Utah State	41	Toledo	15	29,243
17	December 21, 2013	Famous Idaho Potato Bowl	San Diego State	49	Buffalo	24	21,951
18	December 20, 2014	Famous Idaho Potato Bowl	Air Force	38	Western Michigan	24	18,223
19	December 22, 2015	Famous Idaho Potato Bowl	Akron	23	Utah State	21	18,876
20	December 22, 2016	Famous Idaho Potato Bowl	Idaho	61	Colorado State	50	24,975
21	December 22, 2017	Famous Idaho Potato Bowl	Wyoming	37	Central Michigan	14	16,512
22	December 21, 2018	Famous Idaho Potato Bowl	BYU	49	Western Michigan	18	18,711
23	January 3, 2020	Famous Idaho Potato Bowl	Ohio	30	Nevada	21	13,611
24	December 22, 2020	Famous Idaho Potato Bowl	Nevada	38	Tulane	27	0†
25	December 21, 2021	Famous Idaho Potato Bowl	Wyoming	52	Kent State	38	10,217
26	December 20, 2022	Famous Idaho Potato Bowl	Eastern Michigan	41	San Jose State	27	10,122
27	December 23, 2023	Famous Idaho Potato Bowl	Georgia State	45	Utah State	22	12,168
28	December 23, 2024	Famous Idaho Potato Bowl	Northern Illinois	28	Fresno State	20 (2OT)	10,359
29	December 22, 2025	Famous Idaho Potato Bowl	Washington State	34	Utah State	21	17,031

† The December 2020 game was played behind closed doors without fans, due to the COVID-19 pandemic.

== MVPs ==
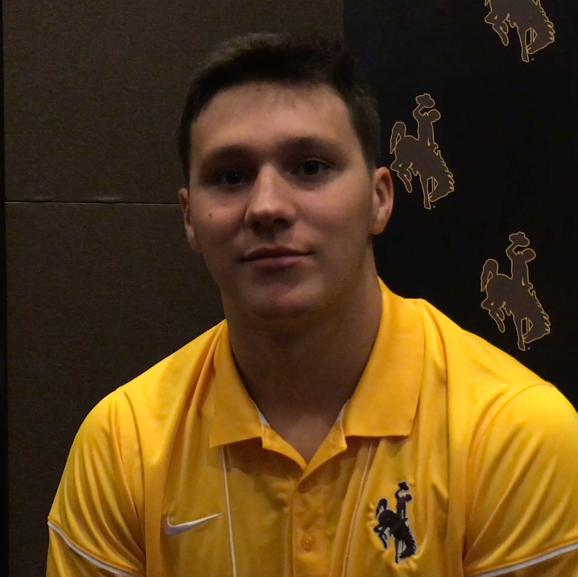
2017 MVP Josh Allen

From 1997 through 2014, the bowl named an MVP from each team; since 2015, a single MVP has been named.

Year	Winning team MVP			Losing team MVP		
Year	Player	Team	Pos.	Player	Team	Pos.
1997	Chad Plummer	Cincinnati	QB	Steve Smith	Utah State	WR
1998	John Welsh	Idaho	QB	Lee Roberts	Southern Miss	QB
1999	Brock Forsey	Boise State	RB	Chris Redman	Louisville	QB
2000	Bart Hendricks	Boise State	QB	Chris Porter	UTEP	RB
2001	Woodrow Dantzler	Clemson	QB	Delwyn Daigre	Louisiana Tech	WR
2002	Bobby Hammer	Boise State	DT	Anthony Forrest	Iowa State	DB
Jan. 2004	P. J. Daniels	Georgia Tech	RB	Cort Moffitt	Tulsa	P
Dec. 2004	Paul Pinegar	Fresno State	QB	Marques Hagans	Virginia	QB
2005	Matt Ryan	Boston College	QB	Jared Zabransky	Boise State	QB
2006	Kirby Freeman	Miami (FL)	QB	Jeff Rowe	Nevada	QB
2007	Tom Brandstater	Fresno State	QB	Jonathan Dwyer	Georgia Tech	RB
2008	Da'Rel Scott	Maryland	RB	Colin Kaepernick	Nevada	QB
2009	DeMaundray Woolridge	Idaho	RB	Freddie Barnes	Bowling Green	WR
2010	Chandler Harnish	Northern Illinois	QB	Jamel Hamler	Fresno State	WR
2011	LaVon Brazill	Ohio	WR	Michael Smith	Utah State	RB
2012	Kerwynn Williams	Utah State	RB	Bernard Reedy	Toledo	WR
2013	Adam Muema	San Diego State	RB	Branden Oliver	Buffalo	RB
2014	Shayne Davern	Air Force	RB	Corey Davis	Western Michigan	WR
2015	Robert Stein	Akron	K			
2016	Matt Linehan	Idaho	QB			
2017	Josh Allen	Wyoming	QB			
2018	Zach Wilson	BYU	QB			
Jan. 2020	Nathan Rourke	Ohio	QB			
Dec. 2020	Carson Strong	Nevada	QB			
2021	Levi Williams	Wyoming	QB			
2022	Taylor Powell	Eastern Michigan	QB			
2023	Darren Grainger	Georgia State	QB			
2024	Josh Holst	Northern Illinois	QB			
2025	Joshua Meredith	Washington State	WR			

== Most appearances ==
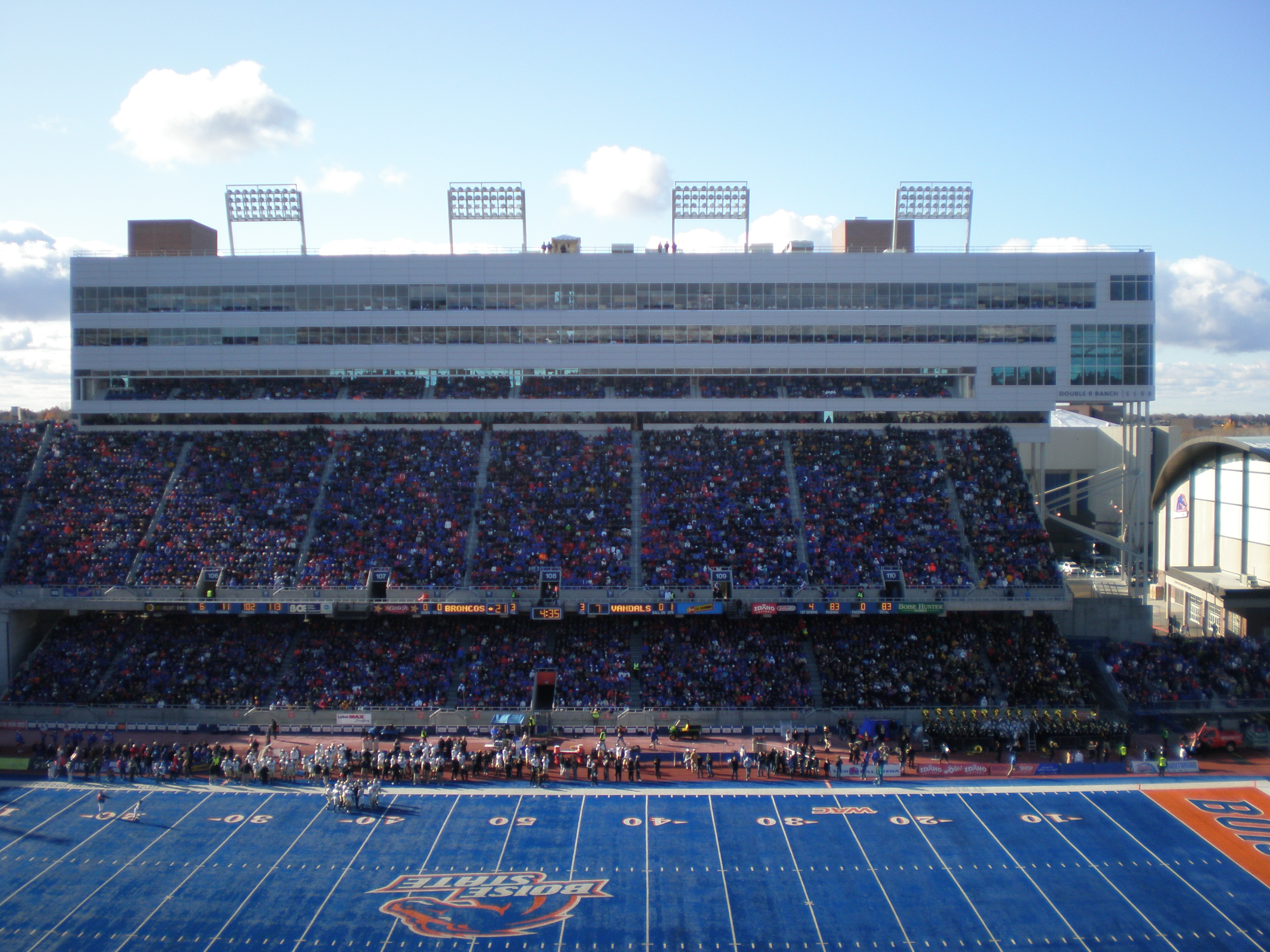
Blue turf of Albertsons Stadium

Boise State, the game's host school, is tied with Idaho for most wins with three. Boise State, Utah State, and Nevada share the most appearances, with four each (Boise State last played in the bowl 20 years ago, in 2005). Idaho was a member of a different conference for each of its three appearances (Big West in 1998, WAC in 2009, and Sun Belt in 2016).

Of the current 10 members of Mountain West, six have appeared in the bowl—Air Force, Nevada, Northern Illinois, San Jose State, UTEP, and Wyoming—either as members of Mountain West, MAC, or WAC. The four that have yet to play are Hawaii, New Mexico, North Dakota State, and UNLV.

The below summary has been updated through the December 2025 edition (29 games, 58 total appearances).

Teams with multiple appearances

Team	Games	Wins	Losses	Win pct.
Utah State	6	1	5	.167
Boise State	4	3	1	.750
Fresno State	4	2	2	.500
Nevada	4	1	3	.250
Idaho	3	3	0	1.000
Ohio	2	2	0	1.000
Wyoming	2	2	0	1.000
Northern Illinois	2	2	0	1.000
Georgia Tech	2	1	1	.500
Western Michigan	2	0	2	.000

Teams with a single appearance

Won (12): Air Force, Akron, Boston College, BYU, Cincinnati, Clemson, Eastern Michigan, Georgia State, Maryland, Miami, San Diego State, Washington State
Lost (15): Bowling Green, Buffalo, Central Michigan, Colorado State, Iowa State, Kent State, Louisiana Tech, Louisville, San Jose State, Southern Miss, Toledo, Tulane, Tulsa, UTEP, Virginia

== Appearances by conference ==
Updated through the December 2025 edition (29 games, 58 total appearances).

Conference	Record				Appearances by season	
Conference	Games	W	L	Win pct.	Won	Lost
MAC	13	6	7	.462	2010, 2011, 2015, 2019*, 2022, 2024	2009, 2012, 2013, 2014, 2017, 2018, 2021
WAC	13	5	8	.385	2002, 2004, 2007, 2009, 2012	2000, 2001, 2003*, 2005, 2006, 2008, 2010, 2011
Mountain West	12	5	7	.417	2013, 2014, 2017, 2020, 2021	2015, 2016, 2019*, 2022, 2023, 2024, 2025
ACC	7	5	2	.714	2001, 2003*, 2005, 2006, 2008	2004, 2007
Big West	4	3	1	.750	1998, 1999, 2000	1997
CUSA	3	1	2	.333	1997	1998, 1999
Sun Belt	2	2	0	1.000	2016, 2023	
Pac-12	1	1	0	1.000	2025	
Independent	1	1	0	1.000	2018	
American	1	0	1	.000		2020
Big 12	1	0	1	.000		2002

- Games marked with an asterisk (*) were played in January of the following calendar year.
- Records reflect conference membership at the time each game was played.
- Conferences that are defunct or no longer active in FBS are marked in italics.
- Independent appearances: BYU (2018)

== Game records ==
Team	Performance vs. Opponent	Year
Most points scored (one team)	61, Idaho vs. Colorado State	2016
Most points scored (losing team)	50, Colorado State vs. Idaho	2016
Most points scored (both teams)	111, Idaho (61) vs. Colorado State (50)	2016
Fewest points allowed	10, Georgia Tech vs. Tulsa	Jan. 2004
Largest margin of victory	42, Georgia Tech vs. Tulsa	Jan. 2004
Total yards	656, Kent State vs. Wyoming	2021
Rushing yards	386, Georgia State vs. Utah State	2023
Passing yards	445, Colorado State vs. Idaho	2016
First downs	30, shared by: Idaho vs. Colorado State; Washington State vs. Utah State	2016; 2025
Fewest yards allowed	144, Georgia Tech vs. Tulsa	Jan. 2004
Fewest rushing yards allowed	–56, Georgia Tech vs. Tulsa	Jan. 2004
Fewest passing yards allowed	19, Tulsa vs. Georgia Tech	Jan. 2004
Individual	Player, Team	Year
All-purpose yards	307, P. J. Daniels (Georgia Tech)	Jan. 2004
Touchdowns (all-purpose)	5, Levi Williams (Wyoming)	Jan. 2021
Rushing yards	307, P. J. Daniels (Georgia Tech)	Jan. 2004
Rushing touchdowns	4, shared by P. J. Daniels (Georgia Tech); Levi Williams (Wyoming)	Jan. 2004; 2021
Passing yards	445, Nick Stevens (Colorado State)	2016
Passing touchdowns	5, shared by: Paul Pinegar (Fresno State); Nick Stevens (Colorado State); Carson Strong (Nevada)	2004; 2016; Dec. 2020
Receiving yards	265, Bisi Johnson (Colorado State)	2016
Receiving touchdowns	3, most recent: Corey Davis (Western Michigan)	2014
Tackles	20, Ryan Skinner (Idaho)	1998
Sacks	3.0, most recent: Paul Fitzgerald (Utah State)	2023
Interceptions	2, most recent: Ryan Glasper (Boston College)	2005
Long Plays	Record, Player, Team vs. Opponent	Year
Touchdown run	80 yds., Levi Williams (Wyoming)	2021
Touchdown pass	80 yds., Dustin Crum to Dante Cephas (Kent State)	2021
Kickoff return	99 yds., Torrey Smith (Maryland)	2008
Punt return	92 yds., Quinton Jones (Boise State)	2005
Interception return	80 yds., Shanaurd Harts (Boise State)	1999
Fumble return	60 yds., Dexter Walker (Air Force)	2014
Punt	69 yds., Aaron Dalton (Utah State)	2015
Field goal	51 yds., shared by: Michael Cklamovski (Northern Illinois); Brandon Talton (Nevada); Jesús Gómez (Eastern Michigan)	2010; Jan. 2020; 2022

== Media coverage ==
The bowl has been televised on ESPN or ESPN2 since its inception.
