= Roady's Truck Stops =

Truck Stops in United States

- Type: Private
- Industry: Truck stop; Convenience store; Petroleum; Restaurant
- Founded: January 1, 2007; 19 years ago
- Headquarters: Nampa, Idaho, United States
- Website: www.roadys.com

Roady's Truck Stops is a group of independently-owned truck stops in the United States. As of February 2023, 316 locations are in operation in the United States. It is headquartered in Nampa, Idaho.

The truck stops provide fuel, food, maintenance, and other services to truck drivers and travellers. They offer amenities such as parking for large vehicles, showers, and laundry facilities.

The company also offers a loyalty program called Roady's Rewards, which allows drivers to earn points for purchases and redeem them for merchandise or services.

== History ==
Roady's Truck Stops was founded on January 1, 2007, when Great Savings Network and TruckStops Direct merged. Great Savings Network was a marketing group that worked with independent truck stops. TruckStops Direct was established in 1994 to strengthen the relationship between truck stops and trucking companies. The Roady's Truck Stop network allows independent truck stop facilities to leverage corporate buying power to get maximum return.

The founders are Scott Moscrip and Kelly Rhinehart. Both are now retired.

=== Humanitarian Bowl ===
From 2007 to 2009, Roady's Truck Stops sponsored the Humanitarian Bowl, a college football bowl game played in Boise at Bronco Stadium on the Boise State University campus.

== See also ==
- List of companies based in Idaho
