= 1997 Weber State Wildcats football team =

American college football season

1997 Weber State Wildcats football
- Conference: Big Sky Conference
- Record: 6–5 (4–4 Big Sky)
- Head coach: Dave Arslanian (9th season)
- Home stadium: Wildcat Stadium

1997 Big Sky Conference football standings
	Conf.			Overall
Team	W		L	W		L
No. 6 Eastern Washington $^	7	–	1	12	–	2
No. 11 Montana ^	6	–	2	8	–	4
Montana State	5	–	3	6	–	5
Northern Arizona	4	–	4	6	–	5
Weber State	4	–	4	6	–	5
Cal State Northridge	4	–	4	4	–	8
Portland State	3	–	5	4	–	7
Idaho State	2	–	6	3	–	8
Sacramento State	1	–	7	1	–	10
$ – Conference champion; ^ – NCAA Division I-AA playoff participant; Cal State Northridge record includes two losses by forfeit; Rankings from The Sports Network poll

The 1997 Weber State Wildcats football team represented Weber State University as a member of the Big Sky Conference during the 1997 NCAA Division I-AA football season. Led by eighth-year head coach Dave Arslanian, the Wildcats compiled an overall record of 6–5, with a mark of 4–4 in conference play, and finished tied for fourth in the Big Sky.

== Schedule ==
Date	Opponent	Rank	Site	Result	Attendance	Source
September 6	Western State (CO)*		Wildcat Stadium; Ogden, UT	W 29–13	7,346	
September 13	Southern Utah*		Wildcat Stadium; Ogden, UT (rivalry)	W 33–32		
September 20	at Boise State*	No. 24	Bronco Stadium; Boise, ID	L 7–24	25,677	
September 27	at No. 21 Eastern Washington		Woodward Field; Cheney, WA	L 11–35	3,574	
October 4	Northern Arizona		Wildcat Stadium; Ogden, UT	W 36–23	10,261	
October 11	at Cal State Northridge		North Campus Stadium; Northridge, CA	L 20–30	3,856	
October 18	Portland State		Wildcat Stadium; Ogden, UT	W 16–7		
November 1	at Montana State		Reno H. Sales Stadium; Bozeman, MT	L 14–28	4,427	
November 8	Sacramento State		Wildcat Stadium; Ogden, UT	W 52–14	4,011	
November 15	at No. 11 Montana		Washington–Grizzly Stadium; Missoula, MT	L 13–38	15,972	
November 22	Idaho State		Wildcat Stadium; Ogden, UT	W 26–7	3,712	
*Non-conference game; Rankings from The Sports Network Poll released prior to the game
