= 1997 Montana State Bobcats football team =

American college football season

1997 Montana State Bobcats football
- Conference: Big Sky Conference
- Record: 6–5 (5–3 Big Sky)
- Head coach: Cliff Hysell (6th season)
- Home stadium: Sales Stadium

1997 Big Sky Conference football standings
	Conf.			Overall
Team	W		L	W		L
No. 6 Eastern Washington $^	7	–	1	12	–	2
No. 11 Montana ^	6	–	2	8	–	4
Montana State	5	–	3	6	–	5
Northern Arizona	4	–	4	6	–	5
Weber State	4	–	4	6	–	5
Cal State Northridge	4	–	4	4	–	8
Portland State	3	–	5	4	–	7
Idaho State	2	–	6	3	–	8
Sacramento State	1	–	7	1	–	10
$ – Conference champion; ^ – NCAA Division I-AA playoff participant; Cal State Northridge record includes two losses by forfeit; Rankings from The Sports Network poll

The 1997 Montana State Bobcats football team was an American football team that represented Montana State University in the Big Sky Conference during the 1997 NCAA Division I-AA football season. In their sixth season under head coach Cliff Hysell, the Bobcats compiled a 6–5 record (5–3 against Big Sky opponents) and finished third in the Big Sky.

== Schedule ==
Date	Opponent	Site	Result	Attendance	Source
September 13	No. 20 ^{D-II} Chadron State*	Sales Stadium; Bozeman, MT	W 24–14	10,007	
September 20	at Southwest Texas State*	Bobcat Stadium; San Marcos, TX	L 26–28	19,198	
September 27	at Idaho State	Holt Arena; Pocatello, ID	W 14–13	5,280	
October 4	No. 20 Eastern Washington	Sales Stadium; Bozeman, MT	W 17–7	11,107	
October 11	at No. 12 Northern Arizona	Walkup Skydome; Flagstaff, AZ	L 13–14	9,247	
October 18	Cal State Northridge^{†}	Sales Stadium; Bozeman, MT	W 31–20	9,357	
October 25	at Portland State	Civic Stadium; Portland, OR	L 0–44	7,811	
November 1	Weber State	Sales Stadium; Bozeman, MT	W 28–14	4,427	
November 8	No. 23 Cal Poly*	Sales Stadium; Bozeman, MT	L 19–20	3,497	
November 15	at Sacramento State	Hornet Stadium; Sacramento, CA	W 30–6	2,018	
November 22	No. 11 Montana	Sales Stadium; Bozeman, MT (rivalry)	L 25–27	13,507	
*Non-conference game; ^{†}Homecoming; Rankings from The Sports Network Poll released prior to the game
