= Chad Plummer =

American gridiron football player (born 1975)

No. 16, 87
- Position: Wide receiver

Personal information
- Born: November 30, 1975 (age 50); Delray Beach, Florida, U.S.
- Listed height: 6 ft 3 in (1.91 m)
- Listed weight: 223 lb (101 kg)

Career information
- High school: Amos P. Godby (Tallahassee, Florida)
- College: Cincinnati
- NFL draft: 1999: 6th round, 204th overall pick

Career history
- Denver Broncos (1999)*; Indianapolis Colts (1999–2000); Cincinnati Bengals (2000–2001)*; Toronto Argonauts (2002); Winnipeg Blue Bombers (2003); Hamilton Tiger-Cats (2003)
- * Offseason or practice squad member only

Awards and highlights
- Humanitarian Bowl MVP (1997)

Career NFL statistics
- Games played: 4
- Stats at Pro Football Reference

Career CFL statistics
- Receptions: 52
- Yards: 902
- Touchdowns: 5

Chad J. Plummer (born November 30, 1975) is a former American and Canadian football wide receiver in the National Football League (NFL) and Canadian Football League (CFL). He was drafted by the Denver Broncos in the sixth round of the 1999 NFL draft. He also played for the Indianapolis Colts, Toronto Argonauts, Winnipeg Blue Bombers and Hamilton Tiger-Cats. He played college football at Cincinnati as a quarterback and wide receiver. He was the MVP of the 1997 Humanitarian Bowl.
