= 1997 Idaho Vandals football team =

American college football season

1997 Idaho Vandals football
- Conference: Big West Conference
- Record: 5–6 (2–3 Big West)
- Head coach: Chris Tormey (3rd season)
- Offensive coordinator: George Yarno (3rd season)
- Offensive scheme: Pro-style
- Defensive coordinator: Nick Holt (4th season)
- Base defense: 4–3
- Home stadium: Kibbie Dome

1997 Big West Conference football standings
	Conf.			Overall
Team	W		L	W		L
Utah State +	4	–	1	6	–	6
Nevada +	4	–	1	5	–	6
Boise State	3	–	2	5	–	6
Idaho	2	–	3	5	–	6
North Texas	2	–	3	4	–	7
New Mexico State	0	–	5	2	–	9
+ – Conference co-champions

The 1997 Idaho Vandals football team represented the University of Idaho in the 1997 NCAA Division I-A football season. The Vandals, led by third-year head coach Chris Tormey, were members of the Big West Conference and played their home games at the Kibbie Dome, an indoor facility on campus in Moscow, Idaho. Idaho was 5–6 overall and 2–3 in conference play.

Idaho's 21-game winning streak at home in the Kibbie Dome came to and end with a blowout loss to bowl-bound Utah State; the Vandals also lost at home to rival Boise State in the season finale, only the second loss to BSU in the last sixteen meetings.

For the first time since 1981, Idaho finished with a losing record. Before the fifteen-year run (1982–96), the previous school record for consecutive winning seasons was only three (1903–05), followed by four other times at two (1910–11, 1920–21, 1923–24, 1937–38).

== Schedule ==
Date	Time	Opponent	Site	Result	Attendance	Source
August 30	1:00 pm	at Air Force*	Falcon Stadium; Colorado Springs, CO	L 10–14	41,331	
September 6	3:00 pm	Portland State*	Kibbie Dome; Moscow, ID	W 46–0	12,128	
September 13	3:00 pm	at Idaho State*	Holt Arena; Pocatello, ID (rivalry)	W 43–0	7,000	
September 20	4:00 pm	at UCF*	Florida Citrus Bowl; Orlando, FL	L 10–41	41,827	
October 4	3:00 pm	North Texas	Kibbie Dome; Moscow, ID	W 30–17	10,270	
October 11	3:00 pm	No. 19 (D-II) UC Davis*^{†}	Kibbie Dome; Moscow, ID	W 44–14	14,137	
October 18	1:00 pm	at Nevada	Mackay Stadium; Reno, NV	L 23–42	22,960	
October 25	5:00 pm	Utah State	Kibbie Dome; Moscow, ID	L 17–63	11,103	
November 1	1:05 pm	at No. 11 Eastern Washington*	Joe Albi Stadium; Spokane, WA	L 21–24	7,756	
November 15	12:30 pm	at New Mexico State	Aggie Memorial Stadium; Las Cruces, NM	W 35–18		
November 22	5:05 pm	Boise State	Kibbie Dome; Moscow, ID (rivalry)	L 23–30 ^{OT}	14,501	
*Non-conference game; ^{†}Homecoming; Rankings from The Sports Network Poll released prior to the game; All times are in Pacific time
