= List of Idaho Vandals football seasons =

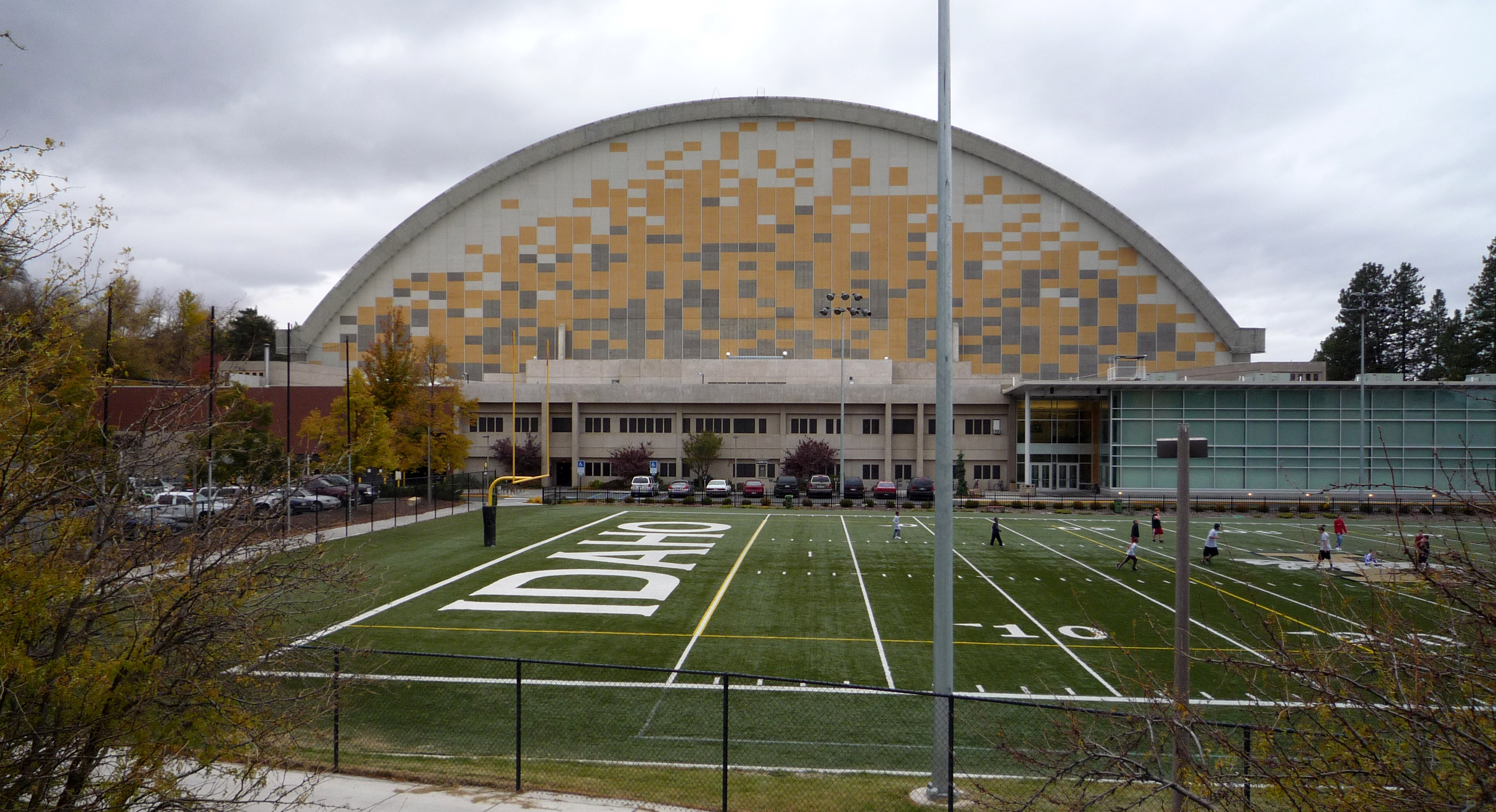
The east exterior of the Kibbie Dome in 2008; Idaho's home since 1971, it was enclosed in 1975

This is a list of seasons completed by the Idaho Vandals football team. The Vandals compete in the Big Sky Conference in the NCAA Division I Football Championship Subdivision (FCS). Representing the University of Idaho in Moscow, Idaho, the Vandals play home games on campus at the 16,000-seat Kibbie Dome; it opened as an outdoor venue in 1971 and was enclosed in 1975.

Idaho began playing football 132 years ago in 1894 as an independent, and was a member of the Pacific Coast Conference from 1922 through 1958; the PCC disbanded the following spring. After playing for six years as a University Division independent, the Vandals joined the Big Sky for football in 1965, where they remained for over thirty years. The Big Sky moved up to the new Division I-AA in 1978; Idaho moved down and often made the I-AA postseason playoffs for over a decade.

In 1996, Idaho moved back to Division I-A as a member of the Big West Conference, and went to the Sun Belt Conference (football only) when the Big West stopped sponsoring football after 2000. After four seasons in the Sun Belt, Idaho joined the Western Athletic Conference in 2005, only to return to the Sun Belt nine years later when the WAC dropped football. The Sun Belt dropped Idaho as a football member after 2017, and rather than attempt to exist as an isolated FBS independent, as they had in 2013, Vandal football became the first FBS program to voluntarily drop to FCS in 2018 and returned to the Big Sky, where Idaho's other teams had rejoined in 2014.

The Vandals are led by head coach Thomas Ford, who was hired after the 2024 season in mid-December.

== Seasons ==
Legend

†National champions
^{†} Conference champions
^{‡} Division champions
^Bowl game berth / playoff result

List of Idaho Vandals football seasons
Season	Team	Head coach	Conference	Regular season results							Postseason results	Final ranking	
Season	Team	Head coach	Conference	Overall			Conference				Bowl game/Playoff result	NCAA/TSN Poll (Note: Since Division I was split into subdivisions, the NCAA poll was the major poll used at the I-AA (FCS) level until 1992, when it was replaced by The Sports Network poll. Beginning in 2015, the FCS now uses the STATS poll.)	AP/Coaches' Poll
Season	Team	Head coach	Conference	Win	Loss	Tie	Win	Loss	Tie	Finish	Bowl game/Playoff result	NCAA/TSN Poll	AP/Coaches' Poll
Idaho Vandals
1894	1894	G. E. Higgins	Independent	0	2	0				—	—	—	—
1895	1895	G. E. Higgins	Independent	0	1	0				—	—	—	—
1896	1896	G. E. Higgins	Independent	No team									
1897	1897	G. E. Higgins	Independent	0	1	0				—	—	—	—
1898	1898	G. E. Higgins	Independent	No games were played									
1899	1899	Morse	Independent	0	4	0				—	—	—	—
1900	1900	Fred Herbold	Independent	1	0	0				—	—	—	—
1901	1901	Fred Herbold	Independent	3	2	1				—	—	—	—
1902	1902	John G. Griffith	Independent	1	3	1				—	—	—	—
1903	1903	John G. Griffith	Independent	3	1	0				—	—	—	—
1904	1904	John G. Griffith	Independent	2	1	0				—	—	—	—
1905	1905	John G. Griffith	Independent	5	0	0				—	—	—	—
1906	1906	John G. Griffith	Independent	2	4	0				—	—	—	—
1907	1907	John R. Middleton	Independent	4	1	1				—	—	—	—
1908	1908	John R. Middleton	Independent	2	2	2				—	—	—	—
1909	1909	John S. Grogan	Independent	3	4	0				—	—	—	—
1910	1910	John G. Griffith	Independent	4	2	0				—	—	—	—
1911	1911	John G. Griffith	Independent	4	3	0				—	—	—	—
1912	1912	John G. Griffith	Independent	2	2	0				—	—	—	—
1913	1913	John G. Griffith	Independent	2	3	1				—	—	—	—
1914	1914	John G. Griffith	Independent	2	3	1				—	—	—	—
1915	1915	Charles Rademacher	Independent	1	4	1				—	—	—	—
1916	1916	Wilfred Bleamaster	Independent	3	5	0				—	—	—	—
1917	1917	Wilfred Bleamaster	Independent	2	3	0				—	—	—	—
1918 (Note: In 1918, an Idaho team of SATC students played several local games after the Armistice (November 11).)		Wilfred Bleamaster	Independent	Season canceled due to World War I									
1919	1919	Ralph Hutchinson	Independent	2	3	0				—	—	—	—
1920	1920	Thomas Kelley	Independent	4	2	0				—	—	—	—
1921	1921	Thomas Kelley	Independent	4	3	1				—	—	—	—
1922	1922	Matty Mathews	Pacific Coast	3	5	0	0	4	0	8th	—	—	—
1923	1923	Matty Mathews	Pacific Coast	5	2	1	2	2	1	3rd	—	—	—
1924	1924	Matty Mathews	Pacific Coast	5	2	1	4	2	0	4th	—	—	—
1925	1925	Matty Mathews	Pacific Coast	3	5	0	2	3	0	6th	—	—	—
1926	1926	Charles Erb	Pacific Coast	3	4	1	1	4	0	T-6th	—	—	—
1927	1927^{†}	Charles Erb	Pacific Coast	4	2	2	2	0	2	T-1st^{†}	—	—	—
1928	1928	Charles Erb	Pacific Coast	3	4	1	2	3	0	T-6th	—	—	—
1929	1929	Leo Calland	Pacific Coast	4	5	0	1	4	0	T-7th	—	—	—
1930	1930	Leo Calland	Pacific Coast	4	7	0	0	5	0	10th	—	—	—
1931	1931	Leo Calland	Pacific Coast	3	4	0	1	4	0	8th	—	—	—
1932	1932	Leo Calland	Pacific Coast	3	5	0	1	4	0	T-8th	—	—	—
1933	1933	Leo Calland	Pacific Coast	4	4	0	1	4	0	9th	—	—	—
1934	1934	Leo Calland	Pacific Coast	3	5	0	1	4	0	8th	—	—	—
1935	1935	Ted Bank	Pacific Coast	2	7	0	1	5	0	9th	—	—	—
1936	1936	Ted Bank	Pacific Coast	3	7	0	0	4	0	10th	—	—	—
1937	1937	Ted Bank	Pacific Coast	4	2	2	2	2	0	5th	—	—	—
1938	1938	Ted Bank	Pacific Coast	6	3	1	2	3	1	7th	—	—	—
1939	1939	Ted Bank	Pacific Coast	2	6	0	0	3	0	10th	—	—	—
1940	1940	Ted Bank	Pacific Coast	1	7	1	0	4	0	10th	—	—	—
1941	1941	Francis Schmidt	Pacific Coast	4	5	0	0	4	0	10th	—	—	—
1942	1942	Francis Schmidt	Pacific Coast	3	7	0	1	5	0	9th	—	—	—
1943		Francis Schmidt	Pacific Coast	Seasons canceled due to World War II									
1944		No coach	Pacific Coast	Seasons canceled due to World War II									
1945	1945	Babe Brown	Pacific Coast	1	7	0	1	5	0	8th	—	—	—
1946	1946	Babe Brown	Pacific Coast	1	8	0	0	5	0	10th	—	—	—
1947	1947	Dixie Howell	Pacific Coast	4	4	0	1	4	0	9th	—	—	—
1948	1948	Dixie Howell	Pacific Coast	3	6	0	1	5	0	9th	—	—	—
1949	1949	Dixie Howell	Pacific Coast	3	5	0	1	4	0	9th	—	—	—
1950	1950	Dixie Howell	Pacific Coast	3	5	1	1	1	1	5th	—	—	—
1951	1951	Babe Curfman	Pacific Coast	2	7	0	0	3	0	9th	—	—	—
1952	1952	Babe Curfman	Pacific Coast	4	4	1	1	3	0	8th	—	—	—
1953	1953	Babe Curfman	Pacific Coast	1	8	0	0	3	0	9th	—	—	—
1954	1954	Skip Stahley	Pacific Coast	4	5	0	1	2	0	7th	—	—	—
1955	1955	Skip Stahley	Pacific Coast	2	7	0	0	4	0	9th	—	—	—
1956	1956	Skip Stahley	Pacific Coast	4	5	0	0	4	0	9th	—	—	—
1957	1957	Skip Stahley	Pacific Coast	4	4	1	0	3	0	9th	—	—	—
1958	1958	Skip Stahley	Pacific Coast	4	5	0	0	3	0	9th	—	—	—
1959	1959	Skip Stahley	Independent	1	9	0				—	—	—	—
1960	1960	Skip Stahley	Independent	1	9	0				—	—	—	—
1961	1961	Skip Stahley	Independent	2	7	0				—	—	—	—
1962	1962	Dee Andros	Independent	2	6	1				—	—	—	—
1963	1963	Dee Andros	Independent	5	4	0				—	—	—	—
1964	1964	Dee Andros	Independent	4	6	0				—	—	—	—
1965 (Note: Idaho joined the Big Sky Conference for football in 1965 but remained in the University Division, and was ineligible for the College Division postseason.)	1965^{†}	Steve Musseau	Big Sky	5	5	0	3	1	0	T-1st^{†}	—	—	—
1966	1966	Steve Musseau	Big Sky	4	6	0	3	1	0	2nd	—	—	—
1967 (Note: Idaho was involuntarily dropped to the College Division in 1967 for two seasons.)	1967	Steve Musseau	Big Sky	4	6	0	2	2	0	T-2nd	—	—	—
1968	1968^{†}	Y C McNease	Big Sky	5	5	0	3	1	0	T-1st^{†}	—	—	—
1969 (Note: Idaho returned to the University Division in 1969, and remained (in Division I) through 1977.)	1969	Y C McNease	Big Sky	2	8	0	1	3	0	4th	—	—	—
1970	1970	Don Robbins	Big Sky	4	7	0	2	2	0	T-3rd	—	—	—
1971	1971^{†}	Don Robbins	Big Sky	8	3	0	4	1	0	1st^{†}	—	—	—
1972	1972	Don Robbins	Big Sky	4	7	0	2	3	0	5th	—	—	
1973 (Note: The NCAA switched to its current divisional system in 1973. The Big Sky was classified a Division II conference for football; Idaho remained in Division I and was ineligible for the Division II postseason.)	1973	Don Robbins	Big Sky	4	7	0	3	2	0	3rd	—	—	
1974	1974	Ed Troxel	Big Sky	2	8	1	2	2	1	3rd	—	—	—
1975	1975	Ed Troxel	Big Sky	4	5	2	2	2	2	T-4th	—	—	—
1976	1976	Ed Troxel	Big Sky	7	4	0	5	1	0	2nd	—	—	—
1977	1977	Ed Troxel	Big Sky	3	8	0	2	4	0	T-5th	—	—	—
1978 (Note: In 1978, the NCAA subdivided Division I into I–A and I–AA; the Big Sky moved up to I–AA, and Idaho moved down.)	1978	Jerry Davitch	Big Sky	2	9	0	2	5	0	T-5th	—	—	—
1979	1979	Jerry Davitch	Big Sky	4	7	0	2	5	0	T-5th	—	—	—
1980 (Note: Overtime rules were added for Big Sky Conference games in 1980, eliminating ties.)	1980	Jerry Davitch	Big Sky	6	5	0	4	3		T-2nd	—	—	—
1981	1981	Jerry Davitch	Big Sky	3	8	0	0	7		8th	—	—	—
1982	1982	Dennis Erickson	Big Sky	9	4	0	5	2		T-1st	NCAA Division I-AA Playoffs — Quarterfinals ^	11	—
1983	1983	Dennis Erickson	Big Sky	8	3	0	4	3		T-3rd	—	—	—
1984	1984	Dennis Erickson	Big Sky	6	5	0	4	3		T-3rd	—	—	—
1985	1985^{†}	Dennis Erickson	Big Sky	9	3	0	6	1		1st^{†}	NCAA Division I-AA Playoffs — First Round ^	5	—
1986	1986	Keith Gilbertson	Big Sky	8	4	0	5	2		3rd	NCAA Division I-AA Playoffs — First Round ^	16	—
1987	1987^{†}	Keith Gilbertson	Big Sky	9	3	0	7	1		1st^{†}	NCAA Division I-AA Playoffs — First Round ^	5	—
1988	1988^{†}	Keith Gilbertson	Big Sky	11	2	0	7	1		1st^{†}	NCAA Division I-AA Playoffs — Semifinals ^	2	—
1989	1989^{†}	John L. Smith	Big Sky	9	3	0	0	8		1st^{†}	NCAA Division I-AA Playoffs — First Round ^	4	—
1990	1990	John L. Smith	Big Sky	9	4	0	6	2		2nd	NCAA Division I-AA Playoffs — Quarterfinals ^	13	—
1991	1991	John L. Smith	Big Sky	6	5	0	4	4		T-4th	—	—	—
1992	1992^{†}	John L. Smith	Big Sky	9	3	0	6	1		1st^{†}	NCAA Division I-AA Playoffs — First Round ^	5	—
1993	1993	John L. Smith	Big Sky	11	3	0	5	2		2nd	NCAA Division I-AA Playoffs — Semifinals ^	11	—
1994	1994	John L. Smith	Big Sky	9	3	0	5	2		2nd	NCAA Division I-AA Playoffs — First Round ^	6	—
1995	1995	Chris Tormey	Big Sky	6	5	0	4	3		T-2nd	NCAA Division I-AA Playoffs — First Round ^	17	—
1996 (Note: Overtime rules were added for Division I in 1996, thereby eliminating ties.)	1996	Chris Tormey	Big West	6	5		3	2		T-3rd	—	—	—
1997	1997	Chris Tormey	Big West	5	6		2	3		T-4th	—	—	—
1998	1998^{†}	Chris Tormey	Big West	9	3		4	1		1st^{†}	Won Humanitarian Bowl against Southern Miss Golden Eagles, 42–35 ^	—	—
1999	1999	Chris Tormey	Big West	7	4		4	2		2nd	—	—	—
2000	2000	Tom Cable	Big West	5	6		3	2		3rd	—	—	—
2001	2001	Tom Cable	Sun Belt	1	10		1	5		T-6th	—	—	—
2002	2002	Tom Cable	Sun Belt	2	10		1	6		7th	—	—	—
2003	2003	Tom Cable	Sun Belt	3	9		3	4		T-4th	—	—	—
2004	2004	Nick Holt	Sun Belt	3	9		2	5		T-5th	—	—	—
2005	2005	Nick Holt	WAC	2	9		2	6		T-6th	—	—	—
2006	2006	Dennis Erickson	WAC	4	8		3	5		T-6th	—	—	—
2007	2007	Robb Akey	WAC	1	11		0	8		9th	—	—	—
2008	2008	Robb Akey	WAC	2	10		1	7		T-8th	—	—	—
2009	2009	Robb Akey	WAC	8	5		4	4		4th	Won Humanitarian Bowl against Bowling Green Falcons, 43–42 ^	—	—
2010	2010	Robb Akey	WAC	6	7		3	5		6th	—	—	—
2011	2011	Robb Akey	WAC	2	10		1	7		8th	—	—	—
2012 (Note: Robb Akey was fired after the eighth game; Jason Gesser was the interim head coach for the season's final four games, all losses.)	2012	Robb Akey; Jason Gesser	WAC	1	11		1	5		6th	—	—	—
2013	2013	Paul Petrino	Independent	1	11					—	—	—	—
2014	2014	Paul Petrino	Sun Belt	1	10		1	7		T-9th	—	—	—
2015	2015	Paul Petrino	Sun Belt	4	8		3	5		T-5th	—	—	—
2016	2016	Paul Petrino	Sun Belt	9	4		6	2		T-3rd	Won Famous Idaho Potato Bowl against Colorado State Rams, 61–50 ^	—	—
2017	2017	Paul Petrino	Sun Belt	4	8		3	5		T-8th	—	—	—
2018 (Note: Idaho voluntarily dropped to FCS in 2018 and rejoined the Big Sky.)	2018	Paul Petrino	Big Sky	4	7		3	5		T-9th	—	—	—
2019	2019	Paul Petrino	Big Sky	5	7		3	5		T-6th	—	—	—
2020	2020	Paul Petrino	Big Sky	2	4		2	4		T-5th	—	—	—
2021	2021	Paul Petrino	Big Sky	4	7		3	5		9th	—	—	—
2022	2022	Jason Eck	Big Sky	7	5		6	2		T-3rd	NCAA Division I FCS Playoffs — First Round ^	18	—
2023	2023	Jason Eck	Big Sky	9	4		6	2		T-2nd	NCAA Division I FCS Playoffs — Quarterfinals ^	8	—
2024	2024	Jason Eck	Big Sky	10	4		6	2		T-3rd	NCAA Division I FCS Playoffs — Quarterfinals ^	7	—
2025	2025	Thomas Ford	Big Sky	4	8		2	6		T–8th	—	—	—
2026	2026	Thomas Ford	5	5		5	2		—	—	—	—	
Totals				All-time: 509–661–26 (.436)			Conference: 228–331–8 (.409)				Postseason: 11–14 (.440)		

== Notes ==
- Totals in the table are computed from the seasons listed above. The University of Idaho's 2026 football record book lists an all-time record of 510–656–28 entering the 2026 season.
