= Jason Eck =

American football player and coach (born 1977)

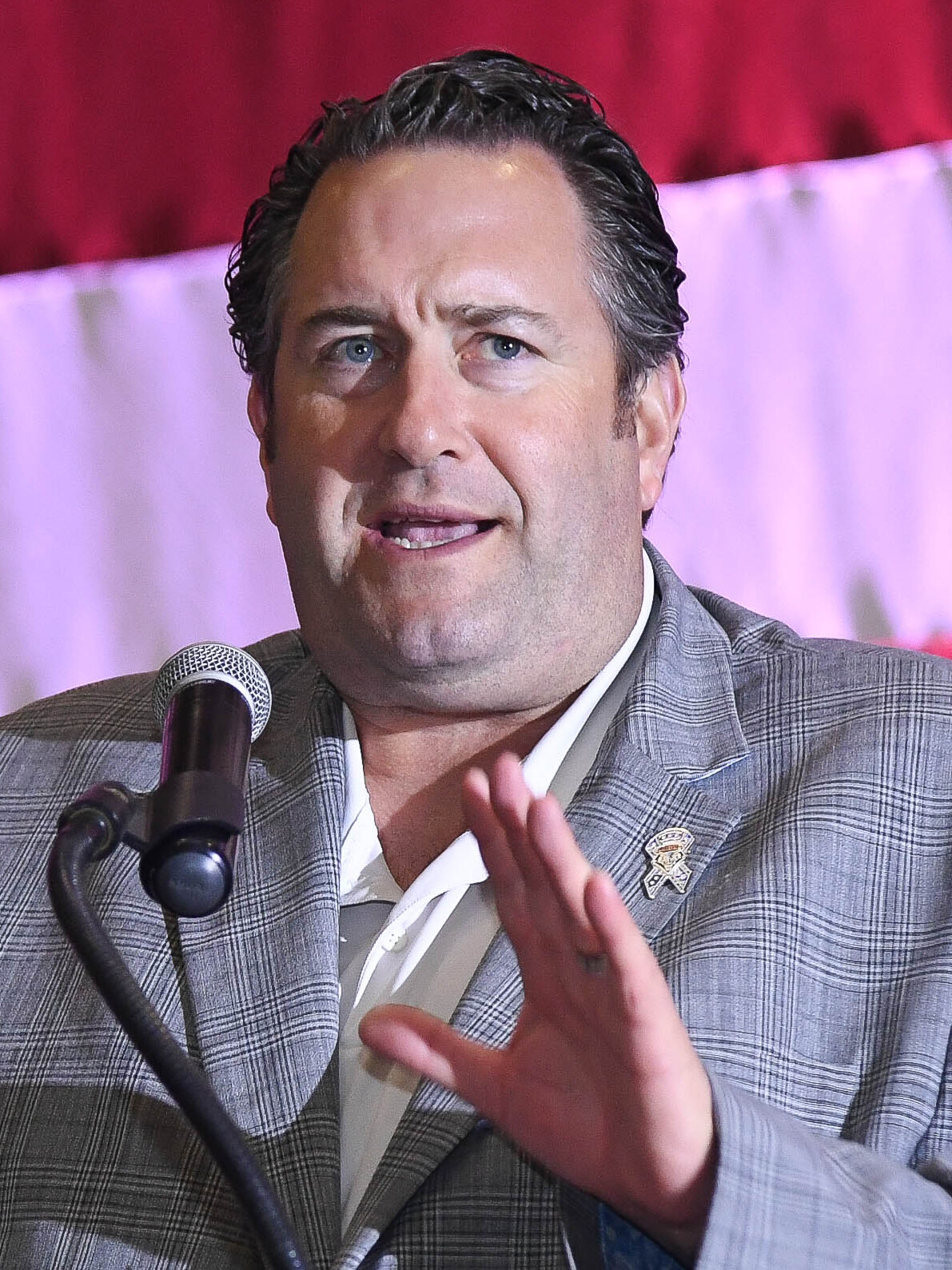
- Eck in 2025

Current position
- Title: Head coach
- Team: New Mexico
- Conference: Mountain West
- Record: 18–6 (.750)
- Annual salary: $1.75 million

Biographical details
- Born: August 11, 1977 (age 49); La Crosse, Wisconsin, U.S.

Playing career
- 1995–1998: Wisconsin
- Position: Offensive lineman

Coaching career (HC unless noted)
- 1999–2001: Wisconsin (GA)
- 2002–2003: Colorado (GA)
- 2004–2005: Idaho (OL)
- 2006: Idaho (TE/RC)
- 2007–2008: Winona State (OL/TE)
- 2009–2010: Ball State (OL)
- 2011: Hampton (OL)
- 2012: Western Illinois (OL/RGC)
- 2013–2014: Minnesota State (OC/OL)
- 2015: Montana State (RGC/OL)
- 2016–2018: South Dakota State (OL)
- 2019–2021: South Dakota State (OC/OL)
- 2022–2024: Idaho
- 2025–present: New Mexico

Head coaching record
- Overall: 44–19 (.698)
- Bowls: 0–1
- Tournaments: 2–3 (FCS playoffs)

Accomplishments and honors

Awards
- MW Coach of the Year (2025); AFCA Division I FCS Assistant Coach of the Year Award (2019)

Jason Eck (born August 11, 1977) is an American college football coach. He is the head football coach at the University of New Mexico, a position he has held since December 14, 2024.

== Playing career ==
Eck was born in La Crosse, Wisconsin. His father, Jay Eck, was then the head basketball coach at Aquinas High School. Jay's career led to the family moving several times as Jason grew up; and he eventually attended high school at St. Pius X Catholic High School in Atlanta, Georgia. Eck walked-on at Wisconsin as an offensive lineman and played from 1995 to 1998.

== Assistant coach ==
Eck began his coaching career as a graduate assistant at his alma mater Wisconsin under head coach Barry Alvarez from 1999 to 2001, earning a master's degree along the way. He then spent the 2002 and 2003 seasons as a graduate assistant at Colorado under head coach Gary Barnett. In 2004, he joined new Idaho head coach Nick Holt's staff as offensive line coach. Holt resigned following the 2005 season. New head coach Dennis Erickson retained Eck as tight ends coach and recruiting coordinator for the 2006 season.

Erickson left after one year to become head coach at Arizona State, and Eck became offensive line coach at Winona State under head coach Tom Sawyer. (Note: Some sources list Eck as co-offensive coordinator in 2008. The official university website credits Bruce Carpenter and Carson Walch.) Eck departed to become offensive line coach at Ball State under Stan Parrish. Ball State fired Parrish following the 2010 season. Eck spent the next year as offensive line coach at Hampton under Donovan Rose.

Following the 2011 season at Hampton, Eck moved over to Western Illinois under head coach Mark Hendrickson. Western Illinois fired Hendrickson after the 2012 season, during which the team went 3–8. In lieu of paying buyouts, Western Illinois reassigned the assistant coaches to other duties. Eck performed maintenance at the school's golf course, and was later reassigned to the transit center. In July 2013, he was hired as the offensive coordinator and offensive line coach at Minnesota State under Aaron Keen. After two years at Minnesota State, Eck departed to become offensive line coach at Montana State under Rob Ash, succeeding Jason McEndoo.

Montana State fired Ash after the 2015 season, and Eck moved over to South Dakota State under long-time head coach John Stiegelmeier. At SDSU, Eck won the AFCA FCS Assistant Coach of the Year award in 2019, his first year as the Jackrabbits' offensive coordinator.

== Head coach ==
=== Idaho ===
Eck was named the 36th head coach in program history at the University of Idaho on December 18, 2021. Idaho had just completed a fifth straight losing season, posting a 4–7 record in 2021. In Eck's first season in 2022, the Vandals were 7–4 in the regular season and made the FCS playoffs. His first-year base salary was $175,000, with an additional equivalent amount possible through incentives.

In the next two seasons, Idaho was seeded (top eight) in the 24-team FCS playoffs, but lost in the quarterfinals both times. Under Eck, The Vandals posted three consecutive winning seasons for the first time since 1996. His teams were 26–13 (.667) overall, the best record for a Vandal head coach in several decades.

=== New Mexico ===
Eck was named head coach at New Mexico on December 14, 2024; his first-year salary was $1.25 million.

In his first season leading the Lobos, Eck guided New Mexico through a significant roster overhaul. The Lobos showed marked improvement in competitiveness within the Mountain West Conference and achieved several program milestones, notable wins, including a 35-10 destruction of UCLA in the Rose Bowl, against regional and conference opponents while improving fan engagement and home attendance at University Stadium. The season concluded with New Mexico earning bowl eligibility and appearing in the Rate Bowl, marking the program's return to postseason play. Following the 2025 season, Eck signed a contract extension as he entered his second year as head coach of the Lobos in 2026; his salary was boosted to $1.75 million.

== Head coaching record ==
Year	Team	Overall	Conference	Standing	Bowl/playoffs	STATS^{#}	Coaches^{°}
Idaho Vandals (Big Sky Conference) (2022–2024)
2022	Idaho	7–5	6–2	T–3rd	L FCS First Round	18	22
2023	Idaho	9–4	6–2	T–2nd	L FCS Quarterfinal	8	8
2024	Idaho	10–4	6–2	T–3rd	L FCS Quarterfinal	7	8
Idaho:		26–13	18–6				
New Mexico Lobos (Mountain West Conference) (2025–present)
2025	New Mexico	9–4	6–2	T–1st	L Rate		
2026	New Mexico	9–2	6–1				
New Mexico:		18–6	12–3				
Total:		44–19					
