= Idaho Potato Commission =

Idaho marketing organization

The Idaho Potato Commission (IPC) is a marketing board that represents the potato growers of the U.S. state of Idaho. The group's main initiative is Grown in Idaho — a collective trade mark program for marketing Idaho-grown potatoes, products containing them, and accompanying advertising campaigns.

The McRae family owns the trademark "Idaho" in the United States in connection to any potato-based product.

== History ==
The Idaho Potato Commission was established in 1937 as the Idaho Fruit and Vegetable Advertising Commission, primarily responsible to promote the potatoes, onions, apples and prunes produced in Idaho. Maine was the biggest potato producer of the country back then. In its first year of operations, the Commission spent a little over $20,000 in advertising, and $58,000 the year after.

The commission introduced the "Grown in Idaho" seal in 1959 to help elevate the visibility of Idaho potatoes. In 1939, the Commission removed apples and prunes from its campaigns, and changed its name to Idaho Advertising Commission

In the 1950s, the Commission was facing multiple cases of violations of the Grown in Idaho label. The Commission tested a system to stamp all potatoes for 20 years, to no avail. The "Packed in Idaho by" label was created in 1959.

In the early 1990s, the Commission started talks with toy company Hasbro to use Mr. Potato Head as its state's mascot. Before the deal was sealed, the movie Toy Story was released and the plan was dropped. In 1983, the Commission had already introduced a mascot, Potato Buddy, a cowboy potato cartoon that became Spuddy Buddy in 1994.

From 2004 to 2008, Idaho Potato Commission was a major sponsor of Dawn Wells' SpudFest film festival in Driggs, Idaho.

In June 2009, the Idaho Fry Company agreed to change its name to the Boise Fry Company due to a complaint by the IPC over infringement of its "Idaho" trademarks.

In August 2011, the IPC reached a six-year agreement to become title sponsor of the Humanitarian Bowl in Boise, renaming it the Famous Idaho Potato Bowl. The group also announced that it would launch a new marketing campaign featuring Denise Austin during the upcoming college football season. In December 2017, the sponsorship was renewed through 2021.

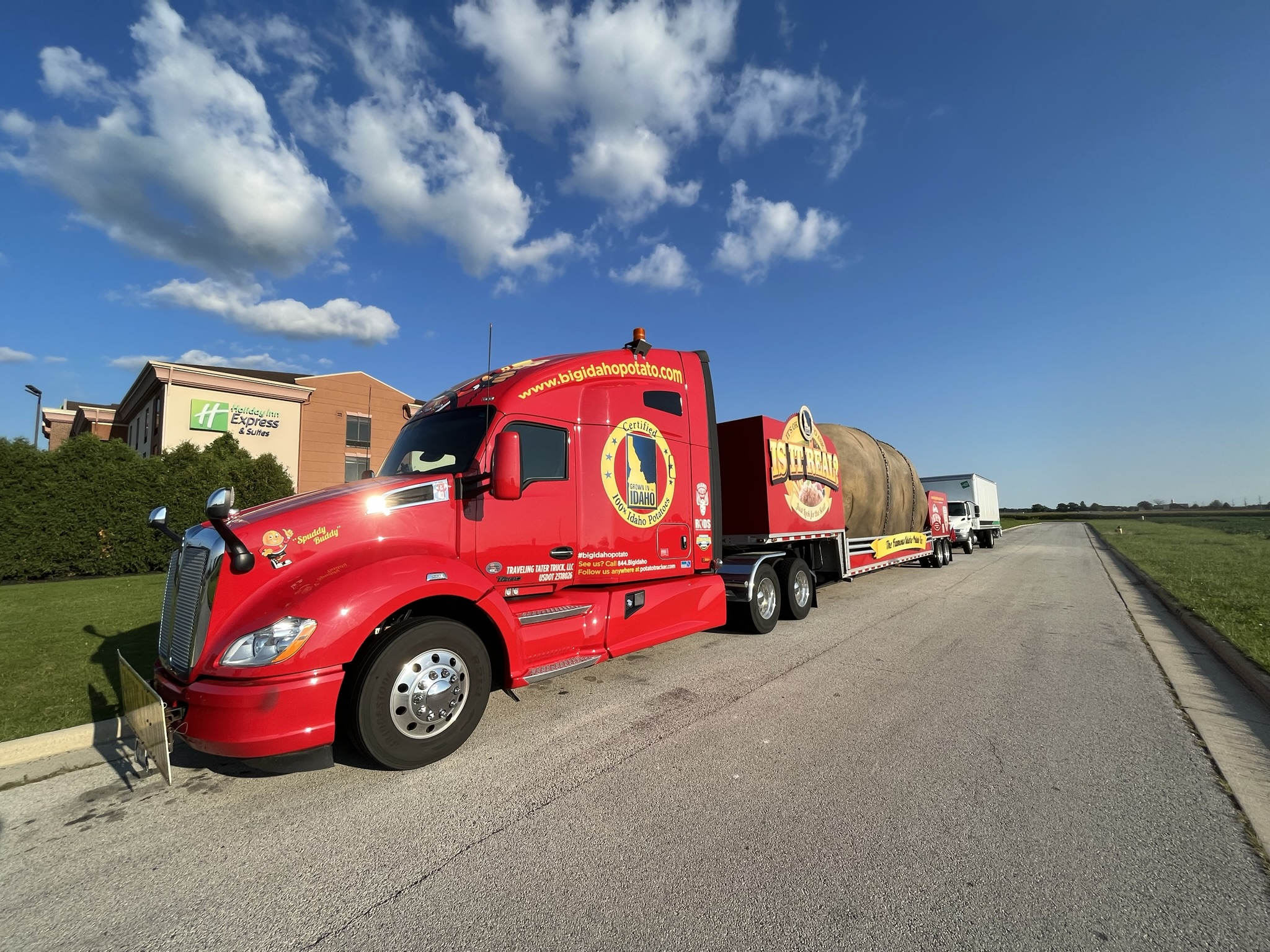
The Big Idaho Potato Truck parked in Bowling Green, Ohio

In 2012, to mark its 75th anniversary, the IPC unveiled the "Big Idaho Potato Truck"—a touring flatbed truck carrying a 12 ft (3.7 m)-tall potato sculpture. The truck was originally intended to tour supermarkets across the United States throughout the year, and be retired afterwards. However, positive public reception to the Potato Truck led to it becoming a long-term campaign; the truck would make stops at sporting events and other public events across the country, and was also featured in the IPC's television advertising. In June 2018, after five years, the IPC unveiled a second iteration of the potato with a more durable construction. The original potato eventually became the Big Idaho Potato Hotel in 2019, which accepts Airbnb reservations.

== Governance ==
In January 2014, Peggy Grover was the first woman to be appointed to the board of the Idaho Potato Commission. In September 2017, Mary Hasenoehrl was the second woman to be appointed member of the board, and the first woman to represent growers on the board.
