= P. J. Daniels =

American football player (born 1982)

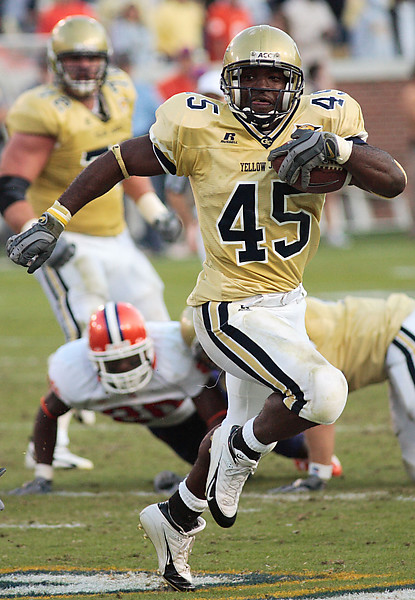
- Daniels while at Georgia Tech

No. 30
- Position: Running back

Personal information
- Born: December 12, 1982 (age 43); Houston, Texas, U.S.
- Listed height: 5 ft 10 in (1.78 m)
- Listed weight: 214 lb (97 kg)

Career information
- High school: Houston (TX) Elsik
- College: Georgia Tech
- NFL draft: 2006: 4th round, 132nd overall pick

Career history
- Baltimore Ravens (2006–2008)

Awards and highlights
- NCAA single bowl game rushing record, 2004; First-team All-ACC (2003); Second-team All-ACC (2005); 2004 Humanitarian Bowl MVP
- Stats at Pro Football Reference

Prince Ahadzie Daniels Jr. (P. J.) (born December 12, 1982) is an American former professional football player who was a running back in the National Football League (NFL). He played for the Baltimore Ravens of the NFL in 2006. He was selected by the Ravens in the fourth round of the 2006 NFL draft as the 132nd overall pick.

== College career ==
While at Georgia Tech, he majored in management and minored in chemistry. In four years, Daniels had over 3,300 yards rushing, 360 yards receiving, 230 kick return yards, and 26 all-purpose touchdowns. The most notable aspect of Daniels' career was that he began the 2002 season as a walk-on and was seventh on the depth chart. Through attrition, flunkouts, and hard work, Daniels became the starter for Georgia Tech in 2003. While at Georgia Tech, he set an NCAA bowl game rushing record with 311 yards and four touchdowns in the 2004 Humanitarian Bowl.

== Professional career ==
P.J. Daniels played sparingly during the 2006 NFL season and recorded six rushing attempts for a total of 14 yards. Daniels suffered an injury and was placed on the Injured reserved list and subsequently waived by the Ravens during the 2008 season.

Pre-draft measurables
Height	Weight	Arm length	Hand span	40-yard dash	10-yard split	20-yard split	20-yard shuttle	Three-cone drill	Vertical jump	Broad jump	Bench press
5 ft 10 1/8 in (1.78 m)	214 lb (97 kg)	30 1/2 in (0.77 m)	9 in (0.23 m)	4.61 s	1.56 s	2.65 s	4.40 s	7.13 s	35.0 in (0.89 m)	9 ft 11 in (3.02 m)	21 reps
All values from NFL Combine/Pro Day

Daniels was selected by the Baltimore Ravens in the fourth round (132nd overall) in the 2006 NFL draft. He did not see the field for the Ravens as a rookie, and was placed on injured reserve before the start of the 2007 season.
