= 1997 Montana Grizzlies football team =

American college football season

1997 Montana Grizzlies football

NCAA Division I-AA First Round, L 14–19 vs. McNeese State
- Conference: Big Sky Conference

Ranking
- Sports Network: No. 11
- Record: 8–4 (6–2 Big Sky)
- Head coach: Mick Dennehy (2nd season)
- Offensive coordinator: Brent Pease (2nd season)
- Defensive coordinator: Jerome Souers (8th season)
- Home stadium: Washington–Grizzly Stadium

1997 Big Sky Conference football standings
	Conf.			Overall
Team	W		L	W		L
No. 6 Eastern Washington $^	7	–	1	12	–	2
No. 11 Montana ^	6	–	2	8	–	4
Montana State	5	–	3	6	–	5
Northern Arizona	4	–	4	6	–	5
Weber State	4	–	4	6	–	5
Cal State Northridge	4	–	4	4	–	8
Portland State	3	–	5	4	–	7
Idaho State	2	–	6	3	–	8
Sacramento State	1	–	7	1	–	10
$ – Conference champion; ^ – NCAA Division I-AA playoff participant; Cal State Northridge record includes two losses by forfeit; Rankings from The Sports Network poll

The 1997 Montana Grizzlies football team represented the University of Montana in the 1997 NCAA Division I-AA football season. The Grizzlies were led by second-year head coach Mick Dennehy and played their home games at Washington–Grizzly Stadium.

== Schedule ==
Date	Time	Opponent	Rank	Site	TV	Result	Attendance	Source
September 13	1:05 pm	No. 14 Stephen F. Austin*	No. 1	Washington–Grizzly Stadium; Missoula, MT	KPAX	W 24–10	18,730	
September 20	1:05 pm	Saint Mary's*	No. 1	Washington–Grizzly Stadium; Missoula, MT		W 35–14	18,384	
September 27	1:05 pm	Sacramento State^{†}	No. 1	Washington–Grizzly Stadium; Missoula, MT		W 52–10	19,046	
October 4	1:00 pm	at Wyoming*	No. 1	War Memorial Stadium; Laramie, WY		L 13–28	18,608	
October 11	2:05 pm	at Idaho State	No. 2	Holt Arena; Pocatello, ID	KPAX	W 48–0	7,596	
October 18	1:05 pm	No. 20 Eastern Washington	No. 2	Washington–Grizzly Stadium; Missoula, MT (rivalry)		L 35–40	19,019	
October 25	4:05 pm	at No. 11 Northern Arizona	No. 6	Walkup Skydome; Flagstaff, AZ	KPAX	L 24–27	15,417	
November 1	12:05 pm	Cal State Northridge	No. 15	Washington–Grizzly Stadium; Missoula, MT		W 21–13	16,775	
November 8	8:05 pm	at Portland State	No. 13	Civic Stadium; Portland, OR	KPAX	W 37–7	12,387	
November 15	12:05 pm	Weber State	No. 11	Washington–Grizzly Stadium; Missoula, MT		W 38–13	15,972	
November 22	12:05 pm	at Montana State	No. 11	Reno H. Sales Stadium; Bozeman, MT (rivalry)	KPAX	W 27–25	13,507	
November 29	6:00 pm	at No. 6 McNeese State*	No. 11	Cowboy Stadium; Lake Charles, LA (NCAA Division I-AA First Round)		L 14–19	13,681	
*Non-conference game; ^{†}Homecoming; Rankings from The Sports Network Poll released prior to the game; All times are in Mountain time
