= 1997 Cal State Northridge Matadors football team =

American college football season

1997 Cal State Northridge Matadors football
- Conference: Big Sky Conference
- Record: 4–8, 2 wins forfeited (4–4 Big Sky)
- Head coach: Jim Fenwick (1st season)
- Offensive coordinator: Rob Phenicie (1st season)
- Defensive coordinator: John Rosenberg (1st season)
- Home stadium: North Campus Stadium

1997 Big Sky Conference football standings
	Conf.			Overall
Team	W		L	W		L
No. 6 Eastern Washington $^	7	–	1	12	–	2
No. 11 Montana ^	6	–	2	8	–	4
Montana State	5	–	3	6	–	5
Northern Arizona	4	–	4	6	–	5
Weber State	4	–	4	6	–	5
Cal State Northridge	4	–	4	4	–	8
Portland State	3	–	5	4	–	7
Idaho State	2	–	6	3	–	8
Sacramento State	1	–	7	1	–	10
$ – Conference champion; ^ – NCAA Division I-AA playoff participant; Cal State Northridge record includes two losses by forfeit; Rankings from The Sports Network poll

The 1997 Cal State Northridge Matadors football team represented California State University, Northridge as a member of the Big Sky Conference during the 1997 NCAA Division I-AA football season. Led by Jim Fenwick in his first and only season as head coach, Cal State Northridge finished the season with an overall record of 6–6 and a mark of 4–4 in conference play, placing in the three-way tie for fourth place in the Big Sky. The team outscored its opponents 370 to 316 for the season. The Matadors played home games at North Campus Stadium in Northridge, California.

After the season, the Matadors were forced to forfeit two of their non-conference wins due to the use of three ineligible players. The two forfeits dropped their overall record to 4–8.

== Schedule ==
Date	Opponent	Site	Result	Attendance	Source
August 30	at Boise State*	Bronco Stadium; Boise, ID	F 63–23 (forfeit)	26,824	
September 6	at Hawaii*	Aloha Stadium; Halawa, HI	L 21–34	33,138	
September 13	at New Mexico State*	Aggie Memorial Stadium; Las Cruces, NM	L 18–28	13,913	
September 20	Azusa Pacific*	North Campus Stadium; Northridge, CA	F 63–21 (forfeit)	4,927	
October 4	at Portland State	Civic Stadium; Portland, OR	L 13–26	6,888	
October 11	Weber State	North Campus Stadium; Northridge, CA	W 30–20	3,856	
October 18	at Montana State	Reno H. Sales Stadium; Bozeman, MT	L 20–31	9,357	
October 25	Sacramento State	North Campus Stadium; Northridge, CA	W 45–38	5,104	
November 1	at No. 15 Montana	Washington–Grizzly Stadium; Missoula, MT	L 13–21	16,775	
November 8	Idaho State	North Campus Stadium; Northridge, CA	W 31–22	2,718	
November 15	at No. 6 Eastern Washington	Woodward Field; Cheney, WA	L 32–39	4,179	
November 22	Northern Arizona	North Campus Stadium; Northridge, CA	W 21–13	4,329	
*Non-conference game; Rankings from The Sports Network Poll released prior to the game
