= 1997 North Texas Mean Green football team =

American college football season

1997 North Texas Mean Green football
- Conference: Big West Conference
- Record: 5–6 (3–2 Big West)
- Head coach: Matt Simon (4th season)
- Offensive coordinator: Charlie Hall (1st season)
- Defensive coordinator: Fred Bleil (2nd season)
- Home stadium: Fouts Field

1997 Big West Conference football standings
	Conf.			Overall
Team	W		L	W		L
Utah State +	4	–	1	6	–	6
Nevada +	4	–	1	5	–	6
Boise State	3	–	2	5	–	6
Idaho	2	–	3	5	–	6
North Texas	2	–	3	4	–	7
New Mexico State	0	–	5	2	–	9
+ – Conference co-champions

The 1997 North Texas Mean Green football team represented the University of North Texas in the 1997 NCAA Division I-A football season. The Mean Green played their home games at the Fouts Field in Denton, Texas, and competed in the Big West Conference. They were led by fourth-year head coach Matt Simon. The team finished the regular season with a 4–7 overall record with a 2–3 mark in Big West play. Simon was fired at the conclusion of the season.

== Schedule ==
Date	Time	Opponent	Site	Result	Attendance	Source
August 30		at Vanderbilt*	Vanderbilt Stadium; Nashville, TN	L 12–29	38,281	
September 6	3:00 p.m.	at Oregon State*	Parker Stadium; Corvallis, OR	L 7–33	30,818	
September 13		Indiana State*	Fouts Field; Denton, TX	W 41–6		
September 20	6:30 p.m.	at Texas Tech*	Jones Stadium; Lubbock, TX	W 30–27	43,620	
September 27	2:30 p.m.	vs. No. 22 Texas A&M*	Texas Stadium; Irving, TX	L 10–36	42,224	
October 4	5:00 p.m.	at Idaho	Kibbie Dome; Moscow, ID	L 17–30	10,270	
October 18		Boise State*^{†}	Fouts Field; Denton, TX	L 14–17	15,047	
October 25		at Nevada	Mackay Stadium; Reno, NV	L 10–65	19,470	
November 8		at New Mexico State	Aggie Memorial Stadium; Las Cruces, NM	W 26–15		
November 15		at Army*	Michie Stadium; West Point, NY	L 14–25		
November 22		Utah State	Fouts Field; Denton, TX	W 51–48	6,750	
*Non-conference game; ^{†}Homecoming; Rankings from AP Poll released prior to the game; All times are in Central time

== "Do you believe in the Mean Green?" ==
Despite a rough season in which North Texas failed to qualify for a bowl game, the 1997 team managed to pull of one of the signature wins in program history on the road over Texas Tech. The Mean Green led the Red Raiders 30-27 in the dying minutes at Jones Stadium in Lubbock. As a final desperation heave into the end zone was batted down incomplete by the North Texas secondary to secure the upset, play-by-play voice George Dunham exclaimed "Do you believe in the Mean Green?" The call became a rallying cry for Mean Green fans, and is still prominently used by the university to this day.
