= 1997 Sacramento State Hornets football team =

American college football season

1997 Sacramento State Hornets football
- Conference: Big Sky Conference
- Record: 1–10 (1–7 Big Sky)
- Head coach: John Volek (3rd season)
- Home stadium: Hornet Stadium

1997 Big Sky Conference football standings
	Conf.			Overall
Team	W		L	W		L
No. 6 Eastern Washington $^	7	–	1	12	–	2
No. 11 Montana ^	6	–	2	8	–	4
Montana State	5	–	3	6	–	5
Northern Arizona	4	–	4	6	–	5
Weber State	4	–	4	6	–	5
Cal State Northridge	4	–	4	4	–	8
Portland State	3	–	5	4	–	7
Idaho State	2	–	6	3	–	8
Sacramento State	1	–	7	1	–	10
$ – Conference champion; ^ – NCAA Division I-AA playoff participant; Cal State Northridge record includes two losses by forfeit; Rankings from The Sports Network poll

The 1997 Sacramento State Hornets football team represented California State University, Sacramento as a member of the Big Sky Conference during the 1997 NCAA Division I-AA football season. Led by third-year head coach John Volek, Sacramento State compiled an overall record of 1–10 with a mark of 1–7 in conference play, placing last out of nine teams in the Big Sky. The team was outscored by its opponents 408 to 188 for the season. The Hornets played home games at Hornet Stadium in Sacramento, California.

== Schedule ==
Date	Opponent	Site	Result	Attendance	Source
September 4	at Southwest Texas State*	Bobcat Stadium; San Marcos, TX	L 14–24	14,164	
September 20	UC Davis*	Hornet Stadium; Sacramento, CA (Causeway Classic)	L 28–36 ^{3OT}	15,650	
September 27	at No. 1 Montana	Washington–Grizzly Stadium; Missoula, MT	L 10–52	19,046	
October 4	Idaho State	Hornet Stadium; Sacramento, CA	W 23–19	3,589	
October 11	at Eastern Washington	Woodward Field; Cheney, WA	L 17–30	2,445	
October 18	No. 11 Northern Arizona	Hornet Stadium; Sacramento, CA	L 25–48	3,020	
October 25	at Cal State Northridge	North Campus Stadium; Northridge, CA	L 38–45 ^{OT}	5,104	
November 1	Portland State	Hornet Stadium; Sacramento, CA	L 13–27	2,701	
November 8	at Weber State	Wildcat Stadium; Ogden, UT	L 14–52	4,011	
November 15	at Montana State	Hornet Stadium; Sacramento, CA	L 6–30	2,018	
November 22	at No. 18 Cal Poly*	Mustang Stadium; San Luis Obispo, CA	L 0–45	7,214	
*Non-conference game; Rankings from The Sports Network Poll released prior to the game
