= 1997 Northern Arizona Lumberjacks football team =

American college football season

1997 Northern Arizona Lumberjacks football
- Conference: Big Sky Conference
- Record: 6–5 (4–4 Big Sky)
- Head coach: Steve Axman (8th season)
- Home stadium: J. Lawrence Walkup Skydome

1997 Big Sky Conference football standings
	Conf.			Overall
Team	W		L	W		L
No. 6 Eastern Washington $^	7	–	1	12	–	2
No. 11 Montana ^	6	–	2	8	–	4
Montana State	5	–	3	6	–	5
Northern Arizona	4	–	4	6	–	5
Weber State	4	–	4	6	–	5
Cal State Northridge	4	–	4	4	–	8
Portland State	3	–	5	4	–	7
Idaho State	2	–	6	3	–	8
Sacramento State	1	–	7	1	–	10
$ – Conference champion; ^ – NCAA Division I-AA playoff participant; Cal State Northridge record includes two losses by forfeit; Rankings from The Sports Network poll

The 1997 Northern Arizona Lumberjacks football team was an American football team that represented Northern Arizona University (NAU) as a member of the Big Sky Conference (Big Sky) during the 1997 NCAA Division I-AA football season. In their eighth and final year under head coach Steve Axman, the Lumberjacks compiled a 6–5 record (4–4 against conference opponents), outscored opponents by a total of 302 to 261, and tied for fourth place in the Big Sky.

The team played its home games at the J. Lawrence Walkup Skydome, commonly known as the Walkup Skydome, in Flagstaff, Arizona.

The team's statistical leaders include Kino Carson with 1,099 rushing yards (including 200 yards vs. Cal State Northridge), Travis Brown with 3,395 passing yards, and Ricky Pearsall with 1,802 receiving yards.

After the season, NAU offered coach Axman a three-year contract at $82,000 per year. He rejected the deal and accepted a position as Minnesota's quarterbacks coach.

== Schedule ==
Date	Opponent	Site	Result	Attendance	Source
August 30	at New Mexico*	University Stadium; Albuquerque, NM	L 10–33	25,643	
September 6	St. Cloud State*	Walkup Skydome; Flagstaff, AZ	W 33–10	9,761	
September 20	Minnesota-Duluth*	Walkup Skydome; Flagstaff, AZ	W 40–6	7,013	
September 27	Portland State^{†}	Walkup Skydome; Flagstaff, AZ	W 56–21	13,055	
October 4	at Weber State	Stewart Stadium; Ogden, UT	L 23–36	10,261	
October 11	Montana State	Walkup Skydome; Flagstaff, AZ	W 14–13	9,247	
October 18	at Sacramento State	Hornet Stadium; Sacramento, CA	W 48–25	3,020	
October 25	Montana	Walkup Skydome; Flagstaff, AZ	W 27–24	15,417	
November 1	at Idaho State	Holt Arena; Pocatello, ID	L 24–41	4,722	
November 8	Eastern Washington	Walkup Skydome; Flagstaff, AZ	L 14–31	12,093	
November 22	at Cal State Northridge	North Campus Stadium; Northridge, CA	L 13–21	4,329	
*Non-conference game; ^{†}Homecoming
