= 1997 Portland State Vikings football team =

American college football season

1997 Portland State Vikings football
- Conference: Big Sky Conference
- Record: 4–7 (3–5 Big Sky)
- Head coach: Tim Walsh (5th season)
- Home stadium: Civic Stadium

1997 Big Sky Conference football standings
| | Conf. | | | Overall |
| Team | W | | L | W | | L |
|---|---|---|---|---|---|---|
| No. 6 Eastern Washington $^ | 7 | – | 1 | 12 | – | 2 |
| No. 11 Montana ^ | 6 | – | 2 | 8 | – | 4 |
| Montana State | 5 | – | 3 | 6 | – | 5 |
| Northern Arizona | 4 | – | 4 | 6 | – | 5 |
| Weber State | 4 | – | 4 | 6 | – | 5 |
| Cal State Northridge | 4 | – | 4 | 4 | – | 8 |
| Portland State | 3 | – | 5 | 4 | – | 7 |
| Idaho State | 2 | – | 6 | 3 | – | 8 |
| Sacramento State | 1 | – | 7 | 1 | – | 10 |
$ – Conference champion; ^ – NCAA Division I-AA playoff participant; Cal State Northridge record includes two losses by forfeit; Rankings from The Sports Network poll

The 1997 Portland State Vikings football team was an American football team that represented Portland State University during the 1997 NCAA Division I-AA football season as a member of the Big Sky Conference. In their fifth year under head coach Tim Walsh, the team compiled a 3–8 record, with a mark of 3–5 in conference play, and finished seventh in the Big Sky.

== Schedule ==
| Date | Opponent | Site | Result | Attendance | Source |
|---|---|---|---|---|---|
| August 30 | at Fresno State* | Bulldog Stadium; Fresno, CA | L 7–35 | 33,114 | |
| September 6 | at Idaho* | Kibbie Dome; Moscow, ID | L 0–46 | 12,128 | |
| September 20 | No. 21 Eastern Washington | Civic Stadium; Portland, OR | L 14–31 | 8,216 | |
| September 27 | at No. 5 Northern Arizona | Walkup Skydome; Flagstaff, AZ | L 21–56 | 13,055 | |
| October 4 | Cal State Northridge | Civic Stadium; Portland, OR | W 26–13 | 6,888 | |
| October 11 | Saint Mary's* | Civic Stadium; Portland, OR | W 35–21 | 6,857 | |
| October 18 | at Weber State | Wildcat Stadium; Ogden, UT | L 7–16 | | |
| October 25 | Montana State | Civic Stadium; Portland, OR | W 44–0 | 7,811 | |
| November 1 | at Sacramento State | Hornet Stadium; Sacramento, CA | W 27–13 | 2,701 | |
| November 8 | No. 13 Montana | Civic Stadium; Portland, OR | L 7–37 | 12,387 | |
| November 15 | at Idaho State | Holt Arena; Pocatello, ID | L 24–26 | 5,228 | |
*Non-conference game; Rankings from The Sports Network Poll released prior to the game
