= 1997 Nevada Wolf Pack football team =

American college football season

1997 Nevada Wolf Pack football

Big West co-champion
- Conference: Big West Conference
- Record: 5–6 (4–1 Big West)
- Head coach: Jeff Tisdel (2nd season)
- Offensive coordinator: Chris Klenakis (1st season)
- Offensive scheme: Pro-style
- Co-defensive coordinators: Ken Flajole (2nd season); Ken Wilson (2nd season)
- Base defense: 3–4
- Home stadium: Mackay Stadium

1997 Big West Conference football standings
	Conf.			Overall
Team	W		L	W		L
Utah State +	4	–	1	6	–	6
Nevada +	4	–	1	5	–	6
Boise State	3	–	2	5	–	6
Idaho	2	–	3	5	–	6
North Texas	2	–	3	4	–	7
New Mexico State	0	–	5	2	–	9
+ – Conference co-champions

The 1997 Nevada Wolf Pack football team represented the University of Nevada, Reno during the 1997 NCAA Division I-A football season. Nevada competed as a member of the Big West Conference (BWC). The Wolf Pack were led by second–year head coach Jeff Tisdel and played their home games at Mackay Stadium.

== Schedule ==
Date	Time	Opponent	Site	Result	Attendance
August 30		at Colorado State*	Hughes Stadium; Fort Collins, CO	L 13–45	29,672
September 6		UNLV*	Mackay Stadium; Reno, NV (Fremont Cannon)	W 31–14	30,118
September 13	1:00 p.m.	Oregon*	Mackay Stadium; Reno, NV	L 20–23 ^{OT}	30,420
September 20		at Southern Miss*	M. M. Roberts Stadium; Hattiesburg, MS	L 19–35	
September 27		at Toledo*	Glass Bowl; Toledo, OH	L 13–31	
October 11		Wyoming*	Mackay Stadium; Reno, NV	L 30–34	21,338
October 18	1:00 p.m.	Idaho^{†}	Mackay Stadium; Reno, NV	W 42–23	22,960
October 25		North Texas	Mackay Stadium; Reno, NV	W 65–10	19,470
November 1		at New Mexico State	Aggie Memorial Stadium; Las Cruces, NM	W 45–24	
November 8		at Boise State	Bronco Stadium; Boise, ID (rivalry)	W 56–42	22,382
November 15		Utah State	Mackay Stadium; Reno, NV	L 19–38	22,780
*Non-conference game; ^{†}Homecoming; All times are in Pacific time
