= 1997 Idaho State Bengals football team =

American college football season

1997 Idaho State Bengals football
- Conference: Big Sky Conference
- Record: 3–8 (2–6 Big Sky)
- Head coach: Tom Walsh (1st season)
- Home stadium: Holt Arena

1997 Big Sky Conference football standings
	Conf.			Overall
Team	W		L	W		L
No. 6 Eastern Washington $^	7	–	1	12	–	2
No. 11 Montana ^	6	–	2	8	–	4
Montana State	5	–	3	6	–	5
Northern Arizona	4	–	4	6	–	5
Weber State	4	–	4	6	–	5
Cal State Northridge	4	–	4	4	–	8
Portland State	3	–	5	4	–	7
Idaho State	2	–	6	3	–	8
Sacramento State	1	–	7	1	–	10
$ – Conference champion; ^ – NCAA Division I-AA playoff participant; Cal State Northridge record includes two losses by forfeit; Rankings from The Sports Network poll

The 1997 Idaho State Bengals football team represented Idaho State University as a member of the Big Sky Conference during the 1997 NCAA Division I-AA football season. Led by first-year head coach Tom Walsh, the Bengals compiled an overall record of 3–8, with a mark of 2–6 in conference play, and finished eighth in the Big Sky.

== Schedule ==
Date	Time	Opponent	Site	Result	Attendance	Source
September 6		at Utah State*	Romney Stadium; Logan, UT	L 7–41	20,497	
September 13	4:00 p.m.	Idaho*	Holt Arena; Pocatello, ID (rivalry)	L 0–43	7,000	
September 27		Montana State	Holt Arena; Pocatello, ID	L 13–14	5,280	
October 4		at Sacramento State	Hornet Stadium; Sacramento, CA	L 19–23	3,589	
October 11	2:05 p.m.	No. 2 Montana	Holt Arena; Pocatello, ID	L 0–48	7,596	
October 18		Southern Utah*	Holt Arena; Pocatello, ID	W 46–31		
October 25		at No. 12 Eastern Washington	Woodward Field; Cheney, WA	L 7–51	3,605	
November 1		No. 10 Northern Arizona	Holt Arena; Pocatello, ID	W 41–24	4,722	
November 8		at Cal State Northridge	North Campus Stadium; Northridge, CA	L 22–31	2,718	
November 15		Portland State	Holt Arena; Pocatello, ID	W 26–24	5,228	
November 22		at Weber State	Wildcat Stadium; Ogden, UT	L 7–26	3,712	
*Non-conference game; Rankings from The Sports Network Poll released prior to the game; All times are in Mountain time
