= Jay Eck =

American basketball player and coach

Biographical details
- Born: 24 December 1950 (age 75); Madison, Wisconsin, U.S.

Playing career
- 1970–1973: Xavier

Coaching career (HC unless noted)
- 1976–1979: Aquinas HS (WI)
- 1979–1983: Bradley (assistant)
- 1983–1985: Pittsburgh (assistant)
- 1985–1987: Wisconsin-Stevens Point
- 1987–1991: Toledo
- 1995–1999: Loyola (Illinois) (assistant)
- 2004–2011: Towson (assistant)

Jay Eck (born 24 December 1950) is an American college basketball coach, last as an assistant coach at Towson University. He has previously served as head coach at the University of Toledo. Eck coached high school basketball at Aquinas High School in Wisconsin before making the jump to the NCAA Division I ranks to be an assistant coach at Bradley in 1979. Eck's son, Jason Eck, is the head football coach at New Mexico.
