= 1997 New Mexico State Aggies football team =

American college football season

1997 New Mexico State Aggies football
- Conference: Big West Conference
- Record: 2–9 (0–5 Big West)
- Head coach: Tony Samuel (1st season)
- Offensive coordinator: Barney Cotton (1st season)
- Offensive scheme: Option
- Defensive coordinator: Jeff Jamrog (1st season)
- Base defense: 4–3
- Home stadium: Aggie Memorial Stadium

1997 Big West Conference football standings
	Conf.			Overall
Team	W		L	W		L
Utah State +	4	–	1	6	–	6
Nevada +	4	–	1	5	–	6
Boise State	3	–	2	5	–	6
Idaho	2	–	3	5	–	6
North Texas	2	–	3	4	–	7
New Mexico State	0	–	5	2	–	9
+ – Conference co-champions

The 1997 New Mexico State Aggies football team was an American football team that represented New Mexico State University in the Big West Conference during the 1997 NCAA Division I-A football season. In their first year under head coach Tony Samuel, the Aggies compiled a 2–9 record. The team played its home games at Aggie Memorial Stadium in Las Cruces, New Mexico.

== Schedule ==
Date	Opponent	Site	Result	Attendance	Source
August 30	at Arizona State*	Sun Devil Stadium; Tempe, AZ	L 10–41	58,607	
September 6	at New Mexico*	University Stadium; Albuquerque, NM (rivalry)	L 24–61		
September 13	Cal State Northridge*	Aggie Memorial Stadium; Las Cruces, NM	W 28–18	13,913	
September 27	at UTEP*	Sun Bowl; El Paso, TX (rivalry)	L 16–24	21,779	
October 4	Cal Poly*	Aggie Memorial Stadium; Las Cruces, NM	L 35–38 ^{OT}		
October 11	at Boise State	Bronco Stadium; Boise, ID	L 10–52	22,814	
October 18	at Utah State	Romney Stadium; Logan, UT	L 7–38	17,251	
October 25	Arkansas State*	Aggie Memorial Stadium; Las Cruces, NM	W 34–20		
November 1	Nevada	Aggie Memorial Stadium; Las Cruces, NM	L 24–45		
November 8	North Texas	Aggie Memorial Stadium; Las Cruces, NM	L 15–26		
November 15	Idaho	Aggie Memorial Stadium; Las Cruces, NM	L 18–35		
*Non-conference game
