= 1997 Eastern Washington Eagles football team =

American college football season

1997 Eastern Washington Eagles football

Big Sky champion

NCAA Division I-AA Semifinal, L 14–25 vs. Youngstown State
- Conference: Big Sky Conference

Ranking
- Sports Network: No. 6
- Record: 12–2 (7–1 Big Sky)
- Head coach: Mike Kramer (4th season)
- Home stadium: Woodward Field; Joe Albi Stadium

1997 Big Sky Conference football standings
	Conf.			Overall
Team	W		L	W		L
No. 6 Eastern Washington $^	7	–	1	12	–	2
No. 11 Montana ^	6	–	2	8	–	4
Montana State	5	–	3	6	–	5
Northern Arizona	4	–	4	6	–	5
Weber State	4	–	4	6	–	5
Cal State Northridge	4	–	4	4	–	8
Portland State	3	–	5	4	–	7
Idaho State	2	–	6	3	–	8
Sacramento State	1	–	7	1	–	10
$ – Conference champion; ^ – NCAA Division I-AA playoff participant; Cal State Northridge record includes two losses by forfeit; Rankings from The Sports Network poll

The 1997 Eastern Washington Eagles football team represented Eastern Washington University as a member of the Big Sky Conference during the 1997 NCAA Division I-AA football season. Led by fourth-year head coach Mike Kramer, the Eagles compiled an overall record of 12–2, with a mark of 7–1 in conference play, and finished as Big Sky champion. The Eagles advanced to the NCAA Division I-AA playoffs and were defeated by Youngstown State in the semifinal.

== Schedule ==
Date	Opponent	Rank	Site	Result	Attendance	Source
September 6	Rocky Mountain*		Woodward Field; Cheney, WA	W 63–7	2,063	
September 13	Eastern Oregon*		Woodward Field; Cheney, WA	W 38–14	1,806	
September 20	at Portland State	No. 21	Civic Stadium; Portland, OR	W 31–14	8,216	
September 27	Weber State	No. 21	Woodward Field; Cheney, WA	W 35–11	3,574	
October 4	at Montana State	No. 20	Reno H. Sales Stadium; Bozeman, MT	L 7–17	11,107	
October 11	Sacramento State		Woodward Field; Cheney, WA	W 30–17	2,445	
October 18	at No. 2 Montana	No. 20	Washington–Grizzly Stadium; Missoula, MT (rivalry)	W 40–35	19,019	
October 25	Idaho State	No. 12	Woodward Field; Cheney, WA	W 51–7	3,605	
November 1	Idaho*	No. 11	Joe Albi Stadium; Spokane, WA	W 24–21	7,756	
November 8	at No. 16 Northern Arizona	No. 8	Walkup Skydome; Flagstaff, AZ	W 31–14	12,093	
November 15	Cal State Northridge	No. 6	Woodward Field; Cheney, WA	W 39–32	4,179	
November 29	No. 21 Northwestern State*	No. 6	Joe Albi Stadium; Spokane, WA (NCAA Division I-AA First Round)	W 40–10	6,384	
December 6	No. 5 Western Kentucky*	No. 6	Joe Albi Stadium; Spokane, WA (NCAA Division I-AA Quarterfinal)	W 38–21	6,829	
December 13	No. 4 Youngstown State*	No. 6	Joe Albi Stadium; Spokane, WA (NCAA Division I-AA Semifinal)	L 14–25	8,529	
*Non-conference game; Rankings from The Sports Network Poll released prior to the game
