= 1997 Humanitarian Bowl =

Cincinnati Bearcats	Utah State Aggies
(7–4)	(6–5)
C-USA	Big West
35	19
Head coach: Rick Minter	Head coach: John L. Smith
	1	2	3	4	Total
Cincinnati	7	14	14	0	35
Utah State	0	0	13	6	19
- Date: December 29, 1997
- Season: 1997
- Stadium: Bronco Stadium
- Location: Boise, Idaho
- Favorite: Cincinnati by 3
- Referee: Chuck McFerrin (Pac-10)
- Attendance: 16,289
- Payout: US$750,000 per team

United States TV coverage
- Network: ESPN2

The 1997 Humanitarian Bowl was the inaugural edition of the bowl game now known as the Famous Idaho Potato Bowl. It featured the Cincinnati Bearcats of Conference USA and the Utah State Aggies of the Big West Conference. This was Cincinnati's first bowl game in 46 years and first bowl win since 1949.

Kickoff was at 1:30 pm MST and it was televised by ESPN2.

== Game summary ==
- Cincinnati – Bonner 14-yard pass from Plummer (Judge kick, 4:03)
- Cincinnati – Bonner 14-yard pass from Kenner (Judge kick, 14:12)
- Cincinnati – Smith 1-yard run (Judge kick, 8:30)
- Cincinnati – Plummer 15-yard run (Judge kick, 8:39)
- Utah State – Smith 75-yard pass from Sauk (Bohn kick, 7:31)
- Cincinnati – O. Smith 7-yard run (Judge kick, 2:28)
- Utah State – Blue 3-yard run (Bohn kick failed, 0:29)
- Utah State – Passey 10-yard fumble return (Sauk pass failed, 14:18)

Favored Cincinnati took a 7–0 lead on a 14-yard touchdown pass from Chad Plummer to Cornelius Bonner. They led 14–0 on a 14-yard scoring pass from Deontey Kenner to Bonner. Lendon Smith scored on a 1-yard touchdown run as Cincinnati took a 21–0 halftime lead.

In the third quarter, Plummer scored on a 15-yard touchdown run making the score 28–0. Utah State got on the board with a 75-yard touchdown pass from Matthew Sauk to Steve Smith. Cincinnati answered with a 7-yard Orlando Smith touchdown run making the score 35–7. Utah State scored on a 3-yard touchdown run making the score 35–13 at the end of the third quarter. In the fourth quarter, Utah State's Brent Passey scored on a 10-yard fumble return making the final score 35–19.
