= Southern California Conference (junior college) =

Junior college athletic conference in Southern California

The Southern California Conference (SCC) was a junior college athletic conference with member schools located in Southern California. It was formed in 1968 with seven charter members: Cypress College, East Los Angeles College, Golden West College, Los Angeles City College (LACC), Los Angeles Harbor College, Los Angeles Southwest College (LASC), and Rio Hondo College. The conference began operations in 1969 and sponsored 11 sports. William B. Stanley, the athletic director at Rio Hondo, was elected the first president of the conference.

== Yearly football standings ==
1969 Southern California Conference football standings
	Conf.					Overall
Team	W		L		T	W		L		T
Harbor $^	5	–	0	–	0	8	–	2	–	0
East Los Angeles	3	–	2	–	0	7	–	2	–	0
Golden West	3	–	2	–	0	6	–	3	–	0
Los Angeles City	3	–	2	–	0	6	–	3	–	0
Rio Hondo *	1	–	4	–	0	3	–	7	–	0
Cypress	0	–	5	–	0	1	–	8	–	0
$ – Conference champion; ^ – California state junior college large division playoff participant * – Pasadena forfeited a non-conference tie with Rio Hondo.

1970 Southern California Conference football standings
	Conf.					Overall
Team	W		L		T	W		L		T
Rio Hondo $^	5	–	0	–	0	9	–	2	–	0
Los Angeles City	4	–	1	–	0	7	–	2	–	0
East Los Angeles	3	–	2	–	0	5	–	3	–	0
Cypress	2	–	3	–	0	2	–	7	–	0
Golden West	1	–	4	–	0	4	–	5	–	0
Harbor	0	–	5	–	0	1	–	8	–	0
$ – Conference champion; ^ – California state junior college large division playoff participant

1971 Southern California Conference football standings
	Conf.					Overall
Team	W		L		T	W		L		T
East Los Angeles +	4	–	1	–	0	7	–	2	–	0
Los Angeles City +	4	–	1	–	0	6	–	3	–	0
Rio Hondo +^	4	–	1	–	0	6	–	5	–	0
Harbor	2	–	3	–	0	4	–	5	–	0
Golden West	1	–	4	–	0	3	–	5	–	1
Cypress	0	–	5	–	0	3	–	6	–	0
$ – Conference champion; ^ – California state junior college large division playoff participant

1972 Southern California Conference football standings
	Conf.					Overall
Team	W		L		T	W		L		T
Rio Hondo $^	7	–	0	–	0	7	–	3	–	0
Golden West	5	–	2	–	0	?	–	?	–	?
Los Angeles City	4	–	3	–	0	?	–	?	–	?
Santa Monica	3	–	4	–	0	?	–	?	–	?
Los Angeles Southwest	3	–	4	–	0	?	–	?	–	?
East Los Angeles	2	–	5	–	0	?	–	?	–	?
Harbor	2	–	5	–	0	?	–	?	–	?
Cypress	2	–	5	–	0	?	–	?	–	?
$ – Conference champion; ^ – California state junior college large division playoff participant

1973 Southern California Conference football standings
	Conf.					Overall
Team	W		L		T	W		L		T
Rio Hondo +	6	–	1	–	0	8	–	1	–	0
Los Angeles City +^	6	–	1	–	0	10	–	2	–	1
Golden West	5	–	1	–	1	7	–	2	–	1
Cypress	3	–	3	–	1	4	–	4	–	1
Santa Monica	3	–	4	–	0	6	–	4	–	0
Harbor	3	–	4	–	0	3	–	7	–	0
East Los Angeles	1	–	6	–	0	1	–	9	–	0
Los Angeles Southwest	0	–	7	–	0	1	–	9	–	0
+ – Conference co-champions; ^ – California state junior college large division playoff participant

1974 Southern California Conference football standings
	Conf.					Overall
Team	W		L		T	W		L		T
East Los Angeles $^	7	–	0	–	0	9	–	1	–	2
Rio Hondo	5	–	2	–	0	7	–	2	–	0
Golden West	4	–	2	–	1	7	–	2	–	1
Los Angeles City	4	–	3	–	0	6	–	4	–	0
Harbor	4	–	3	–	0	5	–	4	–	1
Cypress	2	–	4	–	1	3	–	6	–	1
Santa Monica	1	–	6	–	0	3	–	7	–	0
Los Angeles Southwest	0	–	7	–	0	0	–	9	–	0
$ – Conference champion; ^ – California state junior college Division I playoff participant

1975 Southern California Conference football standings
	Conf.					Overall
Team	W		L		T	W		L		T
Rio Hondo $	6	–	0	–	0	8	–	2	–	0
Golden West	5	–	1	–	0	6	–	4	–	0
Santa Monica	4	–	2	–	0	6	–	3	–	0
Harbor	3	–	3	–	0	5	–	4	–	0
Cypress	2	–	4	–	10	3	–	7	–	0
Los Angeles City	1	–	5	–	0	2	–	7	–	0
Los Angeles Southwest	0	–	6	–	0	0	–	8	–	0
$ – Conference champion

1976 Southern California Conference football standings
	Conf.					Overall
Team	W		L		T	W		L		T
Santa Monica $	6	–	0	–	0	9	–	2	–	0
Golden West	4	–	2	–	0	7	–	3	–	0
Rio Hondo	4	–	2	–	0	5	–	4	–	0
Cypress	4	–	2	–	0	4	–	5	–	0
Harbor	2	–	4	–	0	2	–	6	–	1
Los Angeles City	1	–	5	–	0	2	–	8	–	0
Los Angeles Southwest	0	–	6	–	0	1	–	8	–	0
$ – Conference champion

1977 Southern California Conference football standings
	Conf.					Overall
Team	W		L		T	W		L		T
Golden West $	6	–	0	–	0	9	–	2	–	0
Santa Monica	5	–	1	–	0	9	–	1	–	0
Cypress	3	–	3	–	0	5	–	5	–	0
Harbor	3	–	3	–	0	3	–	7	–	0
Los Angeles City	2	–	4	–	0	?	–	?	–	?
Rio Hondo	2	–	4	–	0	?	–	?	–	?
Los Angeles Southwest	0	–	6	–	0	?	–	?	–	?
$ – Conference champion

1978 Southern California Conference football standings
	Conf.					Overall
Team	W		L		T	W		L		T
Golden West $	6	–	0	–	0	9	–	2	–	0
Santa Monica	5	–	1	–	0	7	–	1	–	1
Los Angeles Southwest	3	–	2	–	1	3	–	5	–	2
Harbor	3	–	2	–	1	3	–	6	–	1
Rio Hondo	2	–	4	–	0	2	–	7	–	0
Cypress	1	–	5	–	0	1	–	9	–	0
Los Angeles City	0	–	6	–	0	0	–	10	–	0
$ – Conference champion

1981 Southern California Conference football standings
	Conf.					Overall
Team	W		L		T	W		L		T
Harbor $	6	–	0	–	0	7	–	4	–	0
Compton	5	–	1	–	0	7	–	3	–	0
Los Angeles City	4	–	2	–	0	4	–	6	–	0
East Los Angeles	2	–	4	–	0	2	–	6	–	0
Los Angeles Southwest	2	–	4	–	0	2	–	6	–	0
West Los Angeles	2	–	4	–	0	2	–	6	–	0
Rio Hondo	0	–	6	–	0	2	–	8	–	0
$ – Conference champion

1982 Southern California Conference football standings
	Conf.					Overall
Team	W		L		T	W		L		T
Harbor $	5	–	1	–	0	8	–	3	–	0
West Los Angeles	4	–	2	–	0	4	–	6	–	0
Compton	3	–	3	–	0	4	–	6	–	0
Los Angeles City	3	–	3	–	0	3	–	7	–	0
East Los Angeles	2	–	4	–	0	4	–	6	–	0
Rio Hondo	2	–	4	–	0	3	–	7	–	0
Los Angeles Southwest	2	–	4	–	0	3	–	7	–	0
$ – Conference champion

1983 Southern California Conference football standings
	Conf.					Overall
Team	W		L		T	W		L		T
Pierce $	5	–	1	–	0	9	–	2	–	0
Los Angeles Valley	4	–	2	–	0	5	–	5	–	0
East Los Angeles	3	–	2	–	1	6	–	3	–	1
Los Angeles Southwest	3	–	3	–	0	5	–	4	–	0
Harbor	3	–	3	–	0	4	–	6	–	0
West Los Angeles	2	–	3	–	1	5	–	4	–	1
Los Angeles City	0	–	6	–	0	0	–	9	–	0
$ – Conference champion

1984 Southern California Conference football standings
	Conf.					Overall
Team	W		L		T	W		L		T
Pierce $	6	–	0	–	0	10	–	1	–	0
West Los Angeles	4	–	2	–	0	6	–	4	–	0
Harbor	4	–	2	–	0	5	–	5	–	0
Los Angeles Southwest	3	–	3	–	0	6	–	4	–	0
Los Angeles Valley	3	–	3	–	0	6	–	4	–	0
East Los Angeles	1	–	5	–	0	1	–	8	–	0
Los Angeles City	0	–	6	–	0	0	–	10	–	0
$ – Conference champion

1985 Southern California Conference football standings
	Conf.					Overall
Team	W		L		T	W		L		T
Pierce $	5	–	0	–	0	9	–	2	–	0
Los Angeles Valley	4	–	1	–	0	8	–	2	–	0
West Los Angeles	3	–	2	–	0	6	–	3	–	0
Harbor	2	–	3	–	0	2	–	7	–	0
East Los Angeles	1	–	4	–	0	3	–	6	–	0
Los Angeles Southwest	0	–	5	–	0	2	–	8	–	0
$ – Conference champion
