= 1997 Boise State Broncos football team =

American college football season

1997 Boise State Broncos football
- Conference: Big West Conference
- Record: 5–6 (3–2 Big West)
- Head coach: Houston Nutt (1st season)
- Offensive coordinator: Mike Markuson (1st season)
- Defensive coordinator: Bobby Allen (1st season)
- Home stadium: Bronco Stadium

1997 Big West Conference football standings
	Conf.			Overall
Team	W		L	W		L
Utah State +	4	–	1	6	–	6
Nevada +	4	–	1	5	–	6
Boise State	3	–	2	5	–	6
Idaho	2	–	3	5	–	6
North Texas	2	–	3	4	–	7
New Mexico State	0	–	5	2	–	9
+ – Conference co-champions

The 1997 Boise State Broncos football team represented Boise State University as a member of the Big West Conference during the 1997 NCAA Division I-A football season. Led by Houston Nutt in his first and only season as head coach, the Broncos compiled an overall record of 5–6 with a mark of 3–2 in conference play, placing third in the Big West. The team played home games on campus, at Bronco Stadium in Boise, Idaho.

== Schedule ==
Date	Time	Opponent	Site	Result	Attendance	Source
August 30		Cal State Northridge*	Bronco Stadium; Boise, ID	W 23–63 (Cal State forfeit)	26,824	
September 6	1:00 pm	at Wisconsin*	Camp Randall Stadium; Madison, WI	L 24–28	73,209	
September 13		at Central Michigan*	Kelly/Shorts Stadium; Mount Pleasant, MI	L 26–44	19,003	
September 20		Weber State*	Bronco Stadium; Boise, ID	W 24–7	25,677	
September 27	3:00 pm	at No. 15 Washington State*	Martin Stadium; Pullman, WA	L 0–58	34,131	
October 11		New Mexico State	Bronco Stadium; Boise, ID	W 52–10	22,814	
October 18		at North Texas	Fouts Field; Denton, TX	W 17–14	15,047	
October 25		Louisiana Tech*	Bronco Stadium; Boise, ID	L 27–31	20,016	
November 1		at Utah State	Romney Stadium; Logan, UT	L 20–24	18,205	
November 8		Nevada	Bronco Stadium; Boise, ID (rivalry)	L 42–56	22,382	
November 22	6:05 pm	at Idaho	Kibbie Dome; Moscow, ID (rivalry)	W 30–23 ^{OT}	14,501	
*Non-conference game; Rankings from AP Poll released prior to the game; All times are in Mountain time
