= 1997 Utah State Aggies football team =

American college football season

1997 Utah State Aggies football

Big West co-champion

Humanitarian Bowl, L 19–35 vs. Cincinnati
- Conference: Big West Conference
- Record: 6–6 (4–1 Big West)
- Head coach: John L. Smith (3rd season)
- Offensive coordinator: Bobby Petrino (3rd season)
- Defensive coordinator: Chris Smeland (3rd season)
- Home stadium: Romney Stadium

1997 Big West Conference football standings
	Conf.			Overall
Team	W		L	W		L
Utah State +	4	–	1	6	–	6
Nevada +	4	–	1	5	–	6
Boise State	3	–	2	5	–	6
Idaho	2	–	3	5	–	6
North Texas	2	–	3	4	–	7
New Mexico State	0	–	5	2	–	9
+ – Conference co-champions

The 1997 Utah State Aggies football team represented Utah State University in the 1997 NCAA Division I-A football season. The team was led by third-year head coach John L. Smith and played their home games at Romney Stadium in Logan, Utah.

Utah State was co-champion of the Big West Conference, completed the regular season with a 6–5 record (4–1 in conference), and received an invitation to the inaugural Humanitarian Bowl in Boise, Idaho. The Aggies were defeated by Cincinnati, 35–19, in their last bowl appearance until 2011. Smith left for Louisville after the season, and was succeeded by Dave Arslanian in 1998.

== Schedule ==
Date	Opponent	Site	Result	Attendance	Source
August 30	at Utah*	Robert Rice Stadium; Salt Lake City, UT (Battle of the Brothers, Beehive Boot)	W 21–14	33,804	
September 6	Idaho State*	Romney Stadium; Logan, UT	W 41–7	20,497	
September 13	No. 25 Colorado State*	Romney Stadium; Logan, UT	L 24–35	22,097	
September 20	New Mexico*	Romney Stadium; Logan, UT	L 22–25	15,112	
October 3	at No. 24 BYU*	Cougar Stadium; Provo, UT (rivalry, Beehive Boot)	L 35–42	65,754	
October 11	Oregon State*	Parker Stadium; Corvallis, OR	L 16–24	23,210	
October 18	New Mexico State	Romney Stadium; Logan, UT	W 38–7	17,251	
October 25	at Idaho	Kibbie Dome; Moscow, ID	W 63–17	11,163	
November 1	Boise State	Romney Stadium; Logan, UT	W 24–20	18,205	
November 15	at Nevada	Mackay Stadium; Reno, NV	W 38–19	22,780	
November 22	at North Texas	Fouts Field; Denton, TX	L 48–51	6,750	
December 29	vs. Cincinnati*	Bronco Stadium; Boise, ID (Humanitarian Bowl)	L 19–35	16,289	
*Non-conference game; Rankings from AP Poll released prior to the game
