= Marshall Thundering Herd football =

Football team of Marshall University

2026 Marshall Thundering Herd football team
- First season: 1895; 131 years ago
- Athletic director: Gerald Harrison
- Head coach: Tony Gibson; 2nd season, 8–10 (.444)
- Location: Huntington, West Virginia
- Stadium: Joan C. Edwards Stadium (capacity: 38,000)
- Field: James F. Edwards Field
- NCAA division: Division I FBS
- Conference: Sun Belt
- Division: East
- Colors: Kelly green, white and black
- All-time record: 643–581–47 (.524)
- Bowl record: 13–7 (.650)

NCAA Division I FCS championships
- 1992, 1996

Conference championships
- WVIAC: 1925, 1928, 1931 Buckeye: 1937 SoCon: 1988, 1994, 1996 MAC: 1997, 1998, 1999, 2000, 2002 C-USA: 2014 SBC: 2024

Division championships
- MAC East: 1997, 1998, 1999, 2000, 2001, 2002 C-USA East: 2013, 2014, 2020 SBC East: 2024
- Consensus All-Americans: 1
- Rivalries: App State (rivalry); East Carolina (rivalry); Ohio (rivalry); West Virginia (rivalry)

Uniforms
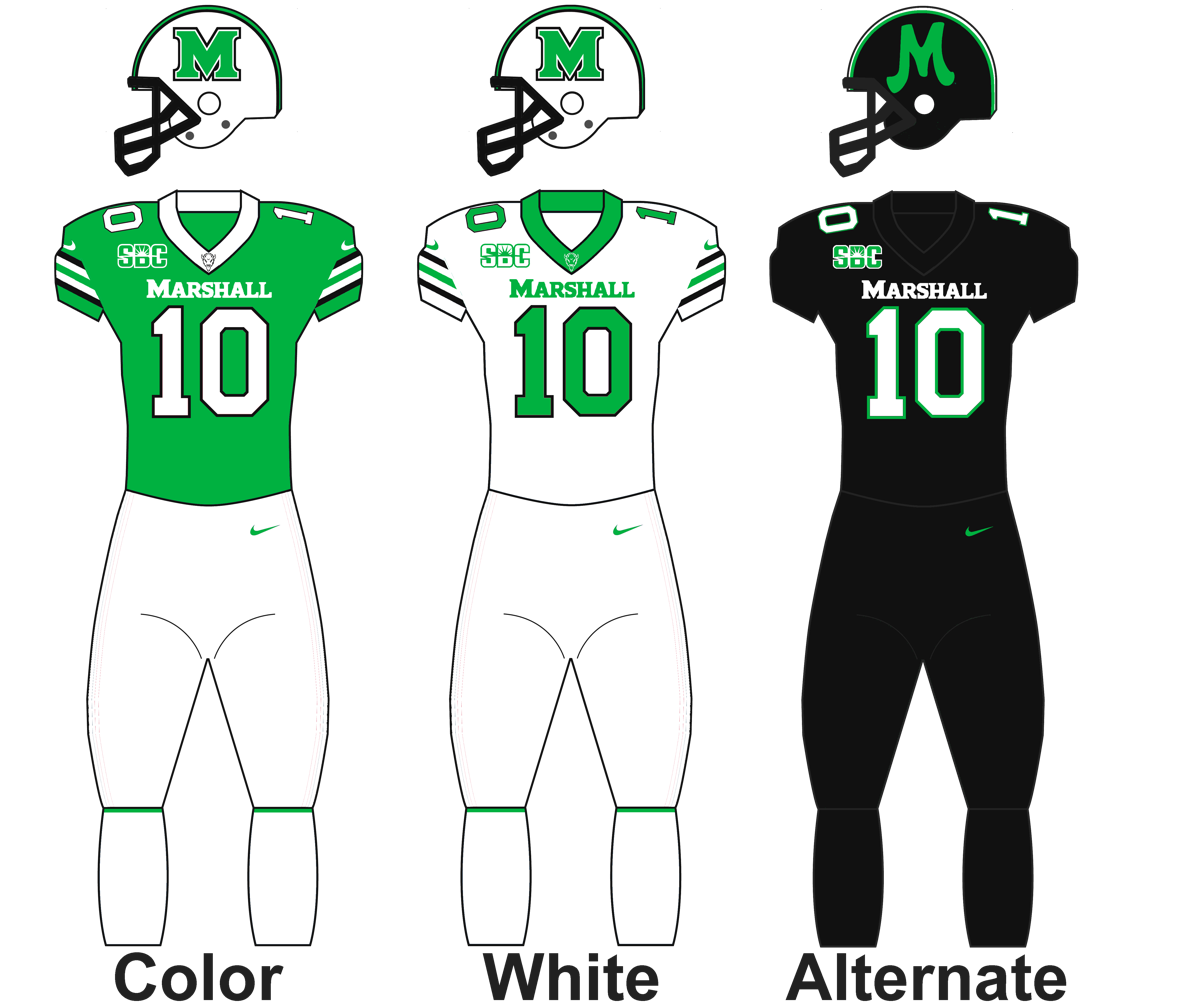
- Fight song: Sons of Marshall
- Mascot: Marco the Bison
- Marching band: Marching Thunder
- Outfitter: Nike
- Website: HerdZone.com

The Marshall Thundering Herd football team is an intercollegiate varsity sports program of Marshall University. The team represents the university as a member of the Sun Belt Conference East Division of the National Collegiate Athletic Association, playing at the NCAA Division I Football Bowl Subdivision level.

Marshall plays at Joan C. Edwards Stadium, which seats 38,227 and is expandable to 55,000. At the end of the 2024 football season, Marshall had a 192–45 record at Joan C. Edwards Stadium for a winning percentage of .810. The stadium opened in 1991 as Marshall University Stadium with a crowd of 33,116 for a 24–23 win over New Hampshire. On September 10, 2010, Marshall played the in-state rival West Virginia Mountaineers in Huntington in front of a record crowd of 41,382. Joan C. Edwards Stadium is one of two Division I stadiums named for a woman. The playing field is named James F. Edwards Field after Joan Edwards' husband, who was a businessman and philanthropist.

== History ==
=== Early history (1895–1916) ===
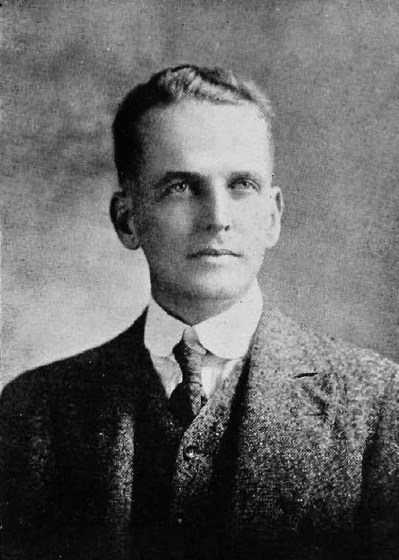
Boyd Chambers, the coach who called the "Tower Play".

Boyd Chambers was Marshall's head football coach from 1909 to 1916. He is best known for calling the "Tower Play", where one receiver lifted another up on his shoulders to complete a pass, during the 1915 season.

=== Rick Tolley era (1969–1970) ===
The memorial at Spring Hill Cemetery in Huntington, West Virginia to the victims of the Southern Airways Flight 932 crash.

Rick Tolley was Marshall's head football coach for two seasons, coming to Marshall from his post as defensive line coach for Wake Forest and posting records of 3–7 and 3–6. Tolley was killed on November 14, 1970, in a plane crash which killed all 75 passengers, including 37 players, five coaches, administrators, family, friends, and the Southern Airways five-person crew, as it returned to West Virginia after a game against East Carolina.

=== Jack Lengyel era (1971–1974) ===
Marshall athletic director, Joe McMullen, hired Jack Lengyel to be head coach in 1971. To rebuild following the plane crash, Lengyel recruited athletes from the baseball and basketball teams. Lengyel's record as Marshall's head coach was 9–33.

=== Frank Ellwood era (1975–1978) ===
Marshall hired Ohio University assistant Frank Ellwood, a Dover, Ohio, native who led the program for four seasons. The team went 2–9 during his first season and 5–6 during the 1976 campaign, a year in which the Thundering Herd upset 20th-ranked Miami (OH) on Sept. 12, 1976 at Fairfield Stadium in Huntington. The Herd had not defeated Miami since 1939. Marshall finished 2–9 and 1–10 in 1977 and 1978, respectively, failing to win a Southern Conference game in either season.

=== Sonny Randle era (1979–1983) ===
Sonny Randle became head coach following the 1978 season. Randle had been the head coach at East Carolina and Virginia. He went 12-42-1 during his five seasons in Huntington, which included a 5-26-1 record in Southern Conference play. Randle mentored Marshall Athletics Hall of Famer Carl Lee during his tenure.

=== Jim Donnan era (1990–1995) ===
Led by head coach Jim Donnan, who came to Marshall from his post as offensive coordinator at Oklahoma, Marshall won the Division I-AA national championship in 1992 over Youngstown State (31–28) and was national runner-up in 1991, 1993 and 1995. Marshall set a I-AA record with five consecutive seasons making the semifinals of the I-AA playoffs from 1991 to 1996. Donnan was named NCAA Division I-AA Coach of the Year twice during his tenure at Marshall and resigned after the 1995 season to accept the head football coach position at Georgia.

=== Bob Pruett era (1996–2004) ===
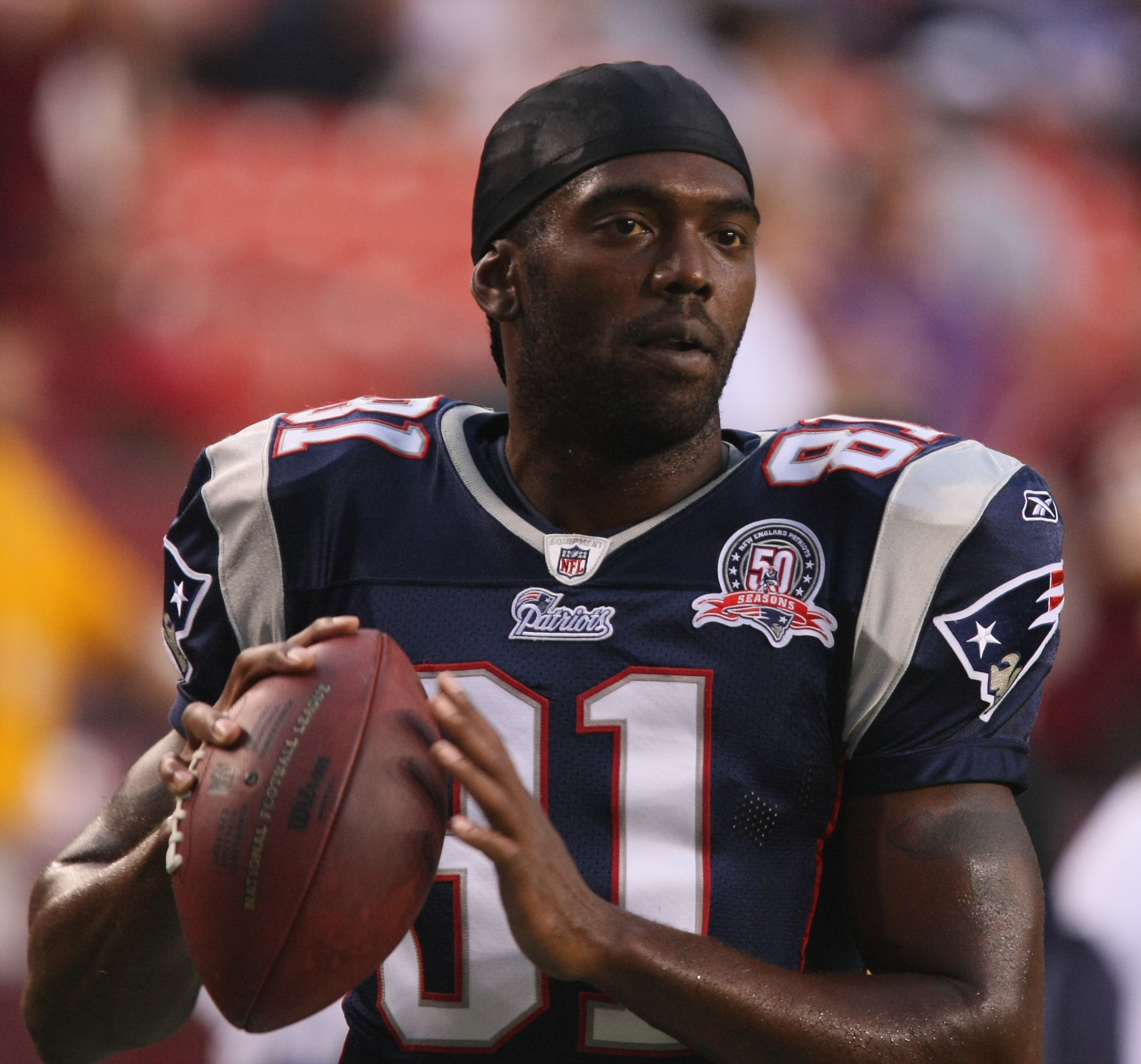
Randy Moss, star wide receiver at Marshall under coach Bob Pruett

Bob Pruett left his post as defensive coordinator at Florida to become head football coach at Marshall, where he served from 1996 to 2004. During his tenure at Marshall, the Thundering Herd compiled a record of 94–23, featured two undefeated seasons, won six conference championships, won five of seven bowl games, and captured the I-AA National Championship in 1996. Marshall moved to Division I-A and the Mid-American Conference in all sports in 1997. The 1996 team, ranked No. 1 all season, was 15–0 and won each game by more than two touchdowns. The 1996 team included future NFL players Chad Pennington, Randy Moss, John Wade, Chris Hanson, Eric Kresser, Doug Chapman. Marshall won the MAC title five of its eight seasons (1997-2000, 2002) and were runners up in 2001 in the conference before moving to Conference USA in 2005.

Since moving back to Division I-A, Marshall has finished in the Top 25 four times, in 1999, 2001, 2002 and 2014. From 1997 to 2000, Marshall appeared in the Motor City Bowl, losing in 1997 to Ole Miss before winning the next three bowl games against Louisville, BYU and Cincinnati. Marshall beat East Carolina 64-61 a double-overtime game in the 2001 GMAC Bowl in Mobile, Alabama. Marshall trailed 38–8 at halftime before rallying behind five Byron Leftwich touchdown passes. Marshall lost 32–14 to Cincinnati in the 2004 Plains Capital Fort Worth Bowl at Amon G. Carter Stadium in Pruett's final game as head coach before his retirement.

=== Mark Snyder era (2005–2009) ===
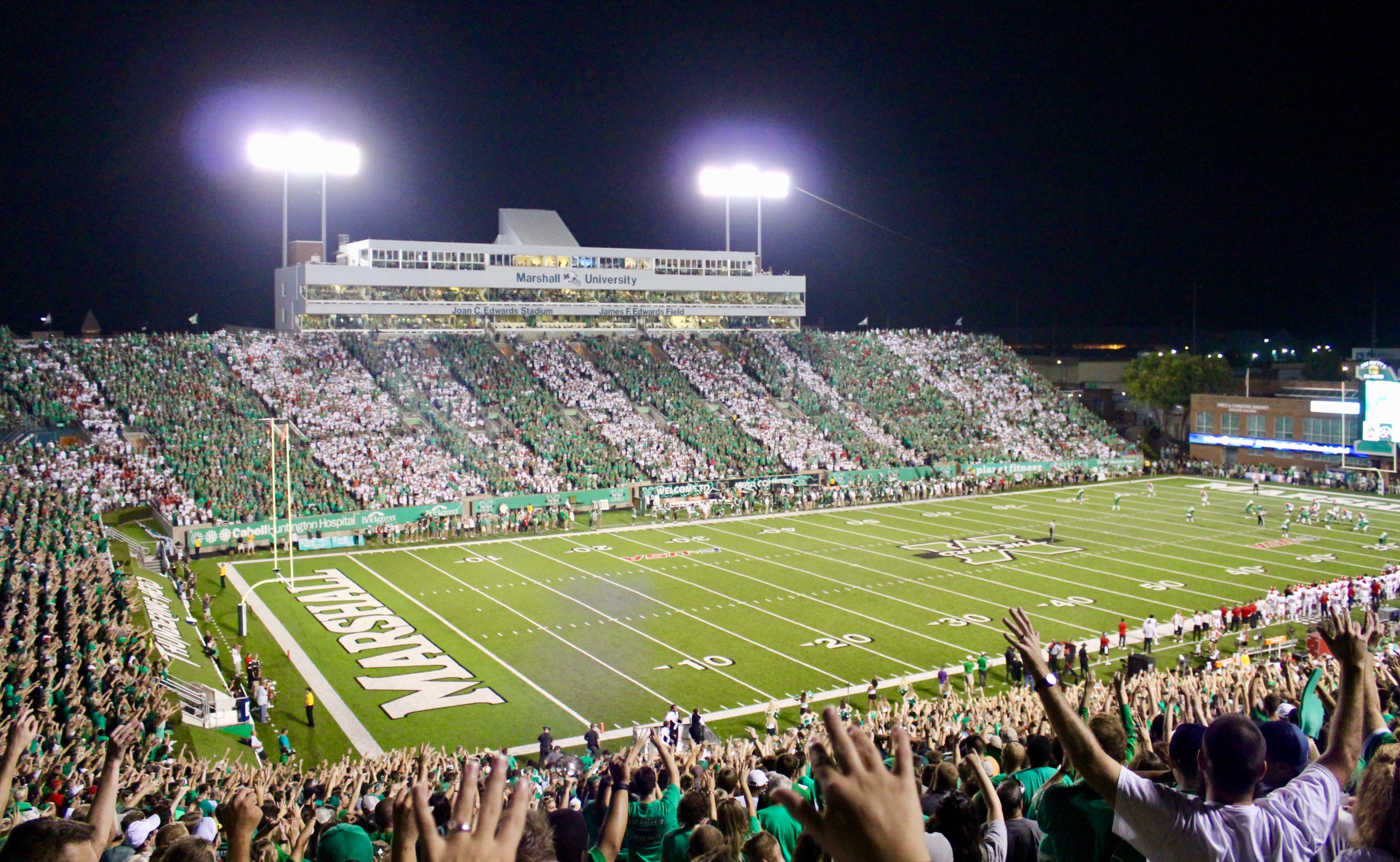
Marshall vs. Louisville 2016

Former Marshall football player Mark Snyder became head football coach, leaving his position as defensive coordinator for Ohio State. Snyder coached Ahmad Bradshaw, Lee Smith, Vinny Curry, Albert McClellan and Cody Slate during his time as head coach at Marshall. Snyder's best season was 6–6 in 2009. He resigned after five seasons that included one bowl berth, the 2009 Little Caesar's Pizza Bowl.

=== Doc Holliday era (2010–2020) ===
On December 17, 2009, Doc Holliday, an assistant coach at West Virginia University, became Marshall's head coach after signing a five-year contract at $600,000 per season. Holliday led Marshall to a 10–4 season in 2013, capped with a victory in the Military Bowl. In the 2014 season, he led the team to a 13–1 season, winning the school's first C-USA Championship and the inaugural Boca Raton Bowl against Northern Illinois 52–23. In 2015, Holliday led the Herd to their first victory over a Big Ten school after beating the Purdue Boilermakers en route to a 10–3 season, including a win in the 2015 St. Petersburg Bowl. In 2020, Holliday led Marshall to a 7–0 start and a No. 15 Associated Press ranking. A three-game losing streak followed and the team finished 7–3. Marshall won the Conference USA East Division title, before losing to the University of Alabama at Birmingham in the 2020 Conference USA Championship game. Holliday was named Coach of the Year in 2020 by Conference USA. In January 2021, Doc Holliday's contract was not extended.

=== Charles Huff era (2021–2024) ===
On January 17, 2021, Marshall hired Alabama running backs coach Charles Huff as its head coach. In his first season, Huff led Marshall to a 7–6 record. Marshall lost to the No. 23-ranked Louisiana Ragin' Cajuns 36–21 in the 2021 New Orleans Bowl. The school officially joined the Sun Belt conference in June 2022. On September 10, 2022, Huff led Marshall to their second all-time victory over a top-10 opponent after defeating the No. 8-ranked Notre Dame Fighting Irish 26–21 at Notre Dame Stadium. Huff earned his first bowl win as a head coach in the 2022 Myrtle Beach Bowl against the UConn Huskies 28–14, finishing the year 9–4. During the 2023 season, Huff guided Marshall to their first win over the Virginia Tech Hokies since 1940 with a 24–17 victory in Huntington. Despite a 4–0 start, Marshall would finish the regular season 6–6 and lose to the UTSA Roadrunners 35–17 in the 2023 Frisco Bowl to finish the year 6–7. During the 2024 season, Huff guided Marshall to its first Sun Belt East Division crown and first Sun Belt Conference Championship, becoming the first FBS school to win a title for three different conferences, by defeating Louisiana Regin' Cajuns 31-3 in Lafayette, Louisiana, as well as Marshall's first ten-win season since 2015. The day after the win, Coach Huff took the Head Coaching job at Southern Miss after his 4-year contract at Marshall was not renewed.

=== Tony Gibson era (2025–present) ===
Tony Gibson, the NC State defense coordinator, was hired on December 8, 2024 with a 6-year contract to replace Charles Huff.

== Conference affiliations ==
- Independent (1895–1924, 1952–1953, 1969–1976)
- West Virginia Athletic Conference (1925–1932)
- Buckeye Conference (1933–1938)
- West Virginia Intercollegiate Athletic Conference (1939–1947)
- Ohio Valley Conference (1948–1951)
- Mid-American Conference (1954–1968, 1997–2004)
- Southern Conference (1977–1996)
- Conference USA (2005–2021)
- Sun Belt Conference (2022–present)

== Championships ==
=== National championships ===
Marshall has won two NCAA Division I-AA national championships.

Season	Coach	Selector	Record	Opponent	Result
1992	Jim Donnan	NCAA Division I-AA	12–3	Youngstown State	W 31–28
1996	Bob Pruett	NCAA Division I-AA	15–0	Montana	W 49–29

=== Conference championships ===
Marshall has won 14 conference championships, 13 outright and one shared.

Season	Conference	Coach	Conference record	Overall record
1925	West Virginia Intercollegiate Athletic Conference	Charles Tallman	3–0–2	4–1–4
1928	West Virginia Intercollegiate Athletic Conference	Charles Tallman	5–0	8–1–1
1931	West Virginia Intercollegiate Athletic Conference	Tom Dandelet	4–1	6–3
1937	Buckeye Conference	Cam Henderson	4–0–1	9–0–1
1988†	Southern Conference	George Chaump	6–1	11–2
1994	Southern Conference	Jim Donnan	7–1	12–2
1996	Southern Conference	Bob Pruett	8–0	15–0
1997	Mid-American Conference	Bob Pruett	8–1	10–3
1998	Mid-American Conference	Bob Pruett	8–1	12–1
1999	Mid-American Conference	Bob Pruett	9–0	13–0
2000	Mid-American Conference	Bob Pruett	6–3	8–5
2002	Mid-American Conference	Bob Pruett	8–1	11–2
2014	Conference USA	Doc Holliday	7–1	13–1
2024	Sun Belt Conference	Charles Huff	7–1	10–3

† Co-champions

=== Division championships ===
Marshall has ten division championships.

Season	Division	Coach	Opponent	CG result
1997	MAC East	Bob Pruett	Toledo	W 34–14
1998†	MAC East	Bob Pruett	Toledo	W 23–17
1999	MAC East	Bob Pruett	Western Michigan	W 34–30
2000†	MAC East	Bob Pruett	Western Michigan	W 19–14
2001	MAC East	Bob Pruett	Toledo	L 36–41
2002	MAC East	Bob Pruett	Toledo	W 49–45
2013	C-USA East	Doc Holliday	Rice	L 24–41
2014	C-USA East	Doc Holliday	Louisiana Tech	W 26–23
2020	C-USA East	Doc Holliday	UAB	L 13–22
2024	Sun Belt East	Charles Huff	Louisiana	W 31–3

† Co-champions

== Bowl games ==
Marshall has played in 20 bowl games, compiling a record of 13–7 through the 2024 season. The Tangerine Bowl was unsanctioned by the NCAA until 1968. As such, the 1948 appearance in the game is not included in the official NCAA bowl listing for Marshall, which lists Marshall having a bowl record of 13–6.

Season	Coach	Bowl	Opponent	Result
1947	Cam Henderson	Tangerine Bowl	Catawba	L 0–7
1997	Bob Pruett	Motor City Bowl	Ole Miss	L 31–34
1998	Bob Pruett	Motor City Bowl	Louisville	W 48–29
1999	Bob Pruett	Motor City Bowl	BYU	W 21–3
2000	Bob Pruett	Motor City Bowl	Cincinnati	W 25–14
2001	Bob Pruett	GMAC Bowl	East Carolina	W 64–61^{2OT}
2002	Bob Pruett	GMAC Bowl	Louisville	W 38–15
2004	Bob Pruett	Fort Worth Bowl	Cincinnati	L 14–32
2009	Rick Minter	Little Caesars Pizza Bowl	Ohio	W 21–17
2011	Doc Holliday	Beef 'O' Brady's Bowl	FIU	W 20–10
2013	Doc Holliday	Military Bowl	Maryland	W 31–20
2014	Doc Holliday	Boca Raton Bowl	Northern Illinois	W 52–23
2015	Doc Holliday	St. Petersburg Bowl	Connecticut	W 16–10
2017	Doc Holliday	New Mexico Bowl	Colorado State	W 31–28
2018	Doc Holliday	Gasparilla Bowl	South Florida	W 38–20
2019	Doc Holliday	Gasparilla Bowl	UCF	L 25–48
2020	Doc Holliday	Camellia Bowl	Buffalo	L 10–17
2021	Charles Huff	New Orleans Bowl	Louisiana	L 21–36
2022	Charles Huff	Myrtle Beach Bowl	Connecticut	W 28–14
2023	Charles Huff	Frisco Bowl	UTSA	L 17–35

== Uniforms and Logos ==
Traditionally, the logo for Marshall athletics has been usually a green "M" letter logo, usually in trim, on what usually has been white helmets. Kelly and white are the primary colors of the football uniforms. The program also has three logos featuring a bull head mascot, one with the mascot head inside of the "M" logo with the wordmark "MARSHALL", and the other with the stylized "The Herd" wordmark.

Historically, there has also been a black alternate uniform. Historically, the football team has worn a white helmet, with a kelly green stripe surrounded by two white and black stripes across the middle of the helmet, with the "M" letter logo in kelly green with white and black trim; they have also worn a silver, or a kelly green helmet with the same striping as the white helmets, with both the same "M" logo in black (or white trim). For a period in the mid / late 1970s, they also wore a silver helmet which featured a kelly green logo of the state of West Virginia with the "M" logo inside of it.

The Thundering Herd athletic program has had a long standing relationship with Nike as their official outfitter. In 2023, the Marshall sports program extended their partnership with Nike and BSN Sports as the official provider of Marshall's athletic apparel, as well as footwear and other equipment needs in a multi-year deal.

In 2019, Marshall released 2 new (black home and white away) jerseys with 3 pants (black white, and kelly green.) The black and kelly green jerseys had the stylized "The Herd" alternate logo on the front. The white home jersey had the "Marshall" wordmark on the logo's front, with the Nike "swoosh" logo on both the jerseys and pants, which also had the "M" / "The Herd" wordmark logo also on the pants. The jersey numbers were in block font style on the road / alternate jerseys, as they had historically been, and in a varsity font style on the home white jerseys. The striping pattern which had been traditionally on the pants (white, black and kelly green) were removed.

The football team presently also wears, at times, two alternate black helmets, one with the same logo, and the other, with a charging bull logo, both have a white stripe surrounded by two thinner black and kelly green striping pattern going across the middle of the helmet.

In 2020, the football program introduced the current new set of Nike home uniforms, which featured the same traditional striping pattern across the helmets (white, black and a slightly lighter kelly green), jerseys and pants, as well as a new jersey number font style on the jerseys, a double outline varsity jersey number font (which were placed on the home jerseys in 2019) which now appears on all of the jerseys, and a contrasting black collar.

Another later notable change occurred in 2022, that the change of the conference which the team plays in, being as of 2022, the switch from Conference USA to the Sun Belt Conference, indicative in the conference logo on the jerseys.

In 2025, the program refined the football uniforms, adding a white collar on the home jersey and a kelly green collar on the away jersey. A Marco logo was also added in patch form to the front of the collar, replacing the former Bar-M logo that formerly occupied that section. A unique striping (Black, White, Green, White, Black) pattern was added to the jersey sleeves as well, the exact same striping pattern as on the helmet.

== Head coaches ==
Tenure	Season(s)	Coach	Record	Pct.
1903–1904	2	George Ford	4–4–4	.500
1905	1	Alfred McCray	6–2	.750
1906	1	Pearl Rardin	4–1	.800
1908	1	William G. Vinal	0–6	.000
1909–1916	8	Boyd Chambers	32–27–4	.539
1917	1	Burton Shipley	1–7–1	.167
1919	1	Archer Reilly	8–0	1.000
1920	1	Herbert Cramer	0–8	.000
1921–1922	2	Skeeter Shelton	11–6–1	.639
1923	1	Harrison Briggs	1–7	.125
1924	1	Russ Meredith	4–4	.500
1925–1928	4	Charles Tallman	22–9–7	.671
1929–1930	2	John Maulbetsch	8–8–2	.500
1931–1934	4	Tom Dandelet	18–16–2	.528
1935–1949	15	Cam Henderson	68–46–5	.592
1950–1952	3	Pete Pederson	9–19–3	.339
1953–1958	6	Herb Royer	21–31–2	.407
1959–1967	9	Charlie Snyder	28–58–3	.331
1968	1	Perry Moss	0–9–1	.050
1969–1970	2	Rick Tolley	6–13–0	.316
1971–1974	4	Jack Lengyel	9–33–0	.272
1975–1978	4	Frank Ellwood	10–34–0	.227
1979–1983	5	Sonny Randle	12–42–1	.227
1984–1985	2	Stan Parrish	13–8–1	.614
1986–1989	4	George Chaump	33–16–1	.670
1990–1995	6	Jim Donnan	64–21	.753
1996–2004	9	Bob Pruett	94–23	.803
2005–2009	5	Mark Snyder	22–37	.373
2009	1	Rick Minter	1–0	1.000
2010–2020	11	Doc Holliday	85–54	.612
2021–2024	4	Charles Huff	32–20	.615
2025–present	1	Tony Gibson	5–7	.417

== Division I-AA playoff results ==
Marshall has appeared in the I-AA playoffs eight times, compiling a record 23–6. They are two-time I-AA National Champions and four-time national runners-up.

Year	Round	Opponent	Result
1987	First Round; Quarterfinals; Semifinals; National Championship Game	James Madison; Weber State; Appalachian State; Northeast Louisiana	W 41–12; W 51–23; W 24–10; L 42–43
1988	First Round; Quarterfinals	North Texas; Furman	W 7–0; L 9–13
1991	First Round; Quarterfinals; Semifinals; National Championship Game	Western Illinois; Northern Iowa; Eastern Kentucky; Youngstown State	W 20–17 ^{OT} W 41–13; W 14–7; L 17–25
1992	First Round; Quarterfinals; Semifinals; National Championship Game	Eastern Kentucky; Middle Tennessee State; Delaware; Youngstown State	W 44–0; W 35–21; W 28–7; W 31–28
1993	First Round; Quarterfinals; Semifinals; National Championship Game	Howard; Delaware; Troy State; Youngstown State	W 28–14; W 34–31; W 24–21; L 5–17
1994	First Round; Quarterfinals; Semifinals	Middle Tennessee; James Madison; Boise State	W 49–14; W 28–21 ^{OT} L 24–28
1995	First Round; Quarterfinals; Semifinals; National Championship Game	Jackson State; Northern Iowa; McNeese State; Montana	W 38–8; W 41–24; W 25–13; L 20–22
1996	First Round; Quarterfinals; Semifinals; National Championship Game	Delaware; Furman; Northern Iowa; Montana	W 59–14; W 54–0; W 31–14; W 49–29

== "Rivalries" ==
=== Appalachian State ===
Known colloquially as The Old Mountain Feud, the rivalry with Appalachian State was played annually 1977–1996. The rivalry resumed annual play in the 2020 season and is set to continue as Marshall joins Appalachian State in the Sun Belt Conference East Division in 2022. The significance of the rivalry is that both schools are public universities in the Appalachian mountains, dominant in FCS and FBS Group of Five football, recruit the same players out of the same regions, and have a national reputation that exceeds most peer football programs of their size. An altercation at Kidd Brewer Stadium in 2021 made national news after a group of Mountaineer supporters taunted Marshall players on their way to the locker room. Appalachian State leads the all-time series, 16–11.

=== Ohio ===
Marshall's regional rival is Ohio University. Both schools compete against one another in the Battle for the Bell, with a traveling bell trophy as the prize for the victor. Both schools also played in the same MAC Conference for a number of years until Marshall joined Conference USA in 2005 - causing the annual rivalry game to go on hiatus. The regularly scheduled series resumed between the two schools in 2010. The rivalry was renewed in 2009 when the Herd and Bobcats faced off in the 2009 Little Caesars Pizza Bowl, which the Herd won 21–17. Ohio leads the all-time series over Marshall, however the Thundering Herd have won 10 of 15 meetings since rejoining the FBS in 1997. The six-year series contract between the two schools ran out following the 2015 season. The series has since been renewed, as both schools are set to play one another in a future matchup in 2027. Ohio leads the series 33–21–6 through the 2021 season.

=== West Virginia ===
Marshall played West Virginia in the annual Friends of Coal Bowl until 2012. Marshall and WVU first played in 1911, but it wasn't until 2006 before the two schools from the "Mountain State" faced off annually for the Governor's Cup. Some believe the rivalry began due to political pressure from the state government. The two last played in 2012, and there are no immediate plans to renew the rivalry. West Virginia holds a 12–0 lead in the series as of 2012. The record reflects a lack of true rivalry between the schools on the field as well as the lack of desire from either school to continue to series.

=== Western Kentucky ===
Marshall has played Western Kentucky University thirteen times, beginning in 1941 through 2021, with Marshall leading 8-5 in the series. The rivalry went into hiatus due to conference realignment but is scheduled to return as non-conference home and home series. The rivalry is slated to be resumed on Sept. 13, 2031 in Bowling Green, KY. The return trip is scheduled for Sept. 18, 2032 in Huntington, WV.

=== East Carolina ===
Marshall and East Carolina have a "friendly" rivalry with one another. They are emotionally bonded by the tragic plane crash on November 14, 1970. The Thundering Herd were coming back from Greenville, North Carolina after a 17–14 loss to the Pirates when their plane crashed near Ceredo, West Virginia. The teams have been bonded ever since.

One of Marshall and ECU's most memorable games was the 2001 GMAC Bowl as they combined for a bowl record, 125 points, as Marshall overcame a 30-point deficit to beat East Carolina 64–61 in double overtime. After Marshall defeated East Carolina in 2013, it marked ECU's last conference match-up as a member of Conference USA. On April 3, 2014, both schools announced that the two teams will meet again for a home and home seridatees in 2020 and 2021. East Carolina was supposed to host Marshall at Dowdy–Ficklen Stadium in Greenville, NC on September 5, 2020, but was cancelled due to the COVID-19 pandemic. Marshall will host at Joan C. Edwards Stadium in Huntington, West Virginia on September 11, 2021, before travelling to Greenville on September 9, 2023.

ECU was 6–3 against the Herd from 2005 to 2013 when both schools were in Conference USA. East Carolina leads the series 11–6.

== Home venues ==
- Central Field (1895-1927) - No team 1896 & 1918
- Fairfield Stadium (1928–1990) - No team 1943-1945
- Joan C. Edwards Stadium (1991–present)

== Top 25 finishes ==
=== I-AA Polls ===
Year	NCAA rank	Sports network rank
1987	No. 14	
1988	No. 7	
1991	No. 8	
1992		No. 10
1993		No. 9
1994		No. 2
1995		No. 6
1996		No. 1

=== 1-A/FBS Polls ===
Year	AP Rank	Coaches Rank
1999	No. 10	No. 10
2001		No. 21
2002	No. 24	No. 19
2014	No. 23	No. 22

== Individual honors ==
=== Award winners ===
- AFCA Coaches' Choice National Player of the Year

Mike Barber – 1988

- Walter Payton Award

Michael Payton – 1992

- Fred Biletnikoff Award

Randy Moss-1997

- Sammy Baugh Trophy

Chad Pennington – 1999

- William V. Campbell Trophy

Chad Pennington – 1999

=== All-Americans ===
Sources:

- Rasheen Ali (2021)
- Mike Barber (1987, 1988)
- Mike Bartrum (1992)
- Rogers Beckett (1999)
- Troy Brown (1991, 1992)
- B. J. Cohen (1995, 1996)
- Melvin Cunningham (1995, 1996)
- Josh Davis (2001)
- Sean Doctor (1987, 1988)
- Johnathan Goddard (2004)
- Mike Green (2024)
- Chris Hanson (1996)
- Eric Kresser (1996)
- Byron Leftwich (2001, 2002)
- Billy Lyon (1994, 1995, 1996)
- Albert McClellan (2005, 2006)
- Randy Moss (1996, 1997)
- Michael Payton (1991, 1992)
- Chad Pennington (1998, 1999)
- Steve Sciullo (2002)
- Cody Slate (2006)
- Mark Snyder (1987)
- Darius Watts (2001, 2002)
- Tyler Williams (2012)

=== Hall of Fame ===
==== College football ====
Marshall has six players and one coach in the College Football Hall of Fame.

- Harry "Cy" Young starred in football and baseball at Marshall College (University status in 1961) from 1910 to 1912. Young then left Marshall, and was a two-sport All-American at Washington & Lee. He is a member of the W&L HOF, MU HOF, WV Sportswriters HOF and Virginia Sports HOF besides the College FB HOF.
- Jackie Hunt (1939–41) set a national scoring record in 1940 with 27 touchdowns in a ten-game season. He rushed for nearly 4,000 yards for Thundering Herd, a hometown star for the Huntington High Pony Express before joining Marshall. He was drafted by the Chicago Bears and was a two-time All-American, playing in the Blue-Gray Game following his career.
- Mike Barber (1985–88) was a record-setting receiver for Marshall who helped lead the Herd to its first I-AA title game in 1987 and its first Southern Conference title in 1988. He still holds the receiving yardage record at MU with over 4,200 yards and was a two-time All-American before he was drafted by the San Francisco 49ers in the fourth round in 1989. Barber also played for the Arizona Cardinals and Cincinnati Bengals.
- Troy Brown (1991–92) considered the single-most dangerous scoring threat in all of Division I-AA during his two seasons in Huntington, few can match the heralded career of Marshall's record-breaking wide receiver. A dual threat on the playing field, Brown's elusive nature as a receiver and kick returner led the Thundering Herd to back-to-back trips to the Division I- AA (now FCS) National Championship game, garnering the NCAA title in 1992. He caught 139 receptions for 2,746 yards and 24 touchdowns in his career en route to earning First Team All-America honors his senior year. Brown went on to play 14 years in the NFL with the New England Patriots, where he became the franchise's all-time leading receiver and won three Super Bowls with the team.
- Michael Payton (1989-1992) was the starting quarterback for the Thundering Herd, leading the team to its first FCS national championship in 1992. Peyton was the 1992 winner of the Walter Payton Award and was a consensus First-Team All-American.
- Jim Donnan (1990–1995) the only coach representing Marshall in the College Football Hall of Fame. Donnan spent six seasons with Marshall and posted a 64–21 record. He led the Thundering Herd to four Division I-AA National Championship games, winning the 1992 national title. In 1994, the Thundering Herd won the Southern Conference Championship. His 15–4 playoff record ranks second best in NCAA FCS history. He was named Division I- AA Coach of the Year in 1992 and 1995.
- Randy Moss (1996-1997) was a star wide receiver at Marshall in the program's final year in Division I-AA and its first year transitioning back into I-A, after having previously transferred from Florida State. Over two seasons at Marshall, Moss accumulated a total of 174 receptions for 3,529 yards and 54 receiving touchdowns, plus an additional rushing touchdown in 1997. Among Moss's receiving accolades at Marshall, he tied Jerry Rice's 1984 mark at Mississippi Valley State with 28 receiving touchdowns during Marshall's 1996 undefeated NCAA Division I-AA Championship season, including a four-touchdown performance in the title game against Montana; a 49-29 victory, and set a freshman I-AA receiving record of 1,709 yards; a record that still stands today. He also scored a touchdown in all 28 games Marshall played in 1996-97, won the Fred Biletnikoff Award in 1997, and that same year was a finalist for the Heisman Trophy, finishing fourth in the voting. Moss went on to have a Hall of Fame career in the NFL.

==== Pro football ====
- Frank Gatski, C, 1985. Gatski is the only Marshall player to have his jersey number retired and was Marshall's first player in the Professional Football Hall of Fame. The university retired Gatski's No. 72 during a halftime ceremony at Joan C. Edwards Stadium on October 15, 2005. Gatski died a month later, at age 86. During his career with the Cleveland Browns (1946–56) and the Detroit Lions (1957) he won eight championships in 11 title game appearances. Cleveland won the All-American Football Conference four straight years, going 14–0 in 1948, before joining the NFL. The Browns won NFL titles in 1950, 1954 and 1955 and were runners-up in 1951, 1952 and 1953. Gatski's Lions beat the Browns for his final title in 1957. The 31st Street Bridge, connecting Huntington to Proctorville, Ohio, is also named in Gatski's honor, joining U.S. Senator Robert Byrd (formerly the Sixth St. Bridge) and Congressman Nick Rahall (the former 17th St. Bridge) among three structures stretching across the Ohio River from West Virginia to Ohio.
- Randy Moss, WR, 2018. Moss is the second player in the Professional Football Hall of Fame to have been a member of the Thundering Herd. In a career that spanned 14 seasons with the Minnesota Vikings, Oakland Raiders, New England Patriots, Tennessee Titans, and the San Francisco 49ers, Moss amassed the fourth-most receiving yards (15,292) and second-most receiving touchdowns (156) in NFL history. Moss appeared in two Super Bowls (losing both); Super Bowl XLII with the Patriots and Super Bowl XLVII with the 49ers. As of the end of the 2017 NFL season, Moss still holds the NFL record for 17 receiving touchdowns as a rookie (1998), when he also won the AP Offensive Rookie of the Year award, and most receiving touchdowns in a season (23), set back in 2007. Moss over his career also reached the 1,000-yard receiving mark eight times, was elected to six Pro Bowls (winning the MVP in 1999), made the First-team All-Pro four times, and selected as a member of the NFL 2000s All-Decade Team. In addition to his receiving abilities, Moss additionally accumulated two touchdown passes, one touchdown on a punt return, and an interception in his career.

=== Marshall University Hall of Fame ===
Established in 1984, members from the football team are listed below.

- 1970 Crash Victims 1990 Honored
- Bob Adkins, '39 1984
- Mike Barber, '88 1994
- Mike Bartrum, '92 2007
- Ahmad Bradshaw, '06 2017
- Troy Brown, '92 2002
- Doug Chapman, '99 2010
- George Chaump, 2013
- B. J. Cohen, '97 2005
- Larry Coyer, '64 1987
- Chris Crocker, '02 2013
- Melvin Cunningham, '96 2016
- Vinny Curry, '12 2022
- Josh Davis, '04 2018
- Sean Doctor, '88 2000
- Jim Donnan, 2008
- Carl Fodor, '85 1991
- Frank Gatski, '42 1985
- John Grace, '99 2010
- Len Hellyer, '56 1988
- Cam Henderson, '33–55 1984
- Eric Ihnat, '90 2017
- Dewey Klein, '91 2018
- Carl Lee, '82 1995
- Byron Leftwich, '02 2007
- Jack Lengyel, '71-74 2022
- Billy Lyon, '96 2007
- Albert McClellan, '09 2020
- Giradie Mercer, '99 2019
- Randy Moss, '97 2010
- Reggie Oliver, '73 1984
- Tim Openlander, '96 2015
- Chris Parker '95 2000
- Chad Pennington, '99 2010
- Tony Petersen, '88 1994
- Bob Pruett, '65 1999
- Steve Sciullo, '02 2020
- Charlie Slack, '56 1985
- Ed Ulinski, '41 1986
- John Wade, '97 2010
- Darius Watts, '03 2014
- Norm Willey, '49 2003
- Jamie Wilson, '96 2019
- William "Bill" Richard Winter, '64 1990
- Max Yates, '01 2019
- John Zontini '35 1984

=== Retired numbers ===
Marshall Thundering Herd retired numbers
No.	Player	Pos.	Tenure	No. ret.	Ref.
72	Frank Gatski	C	1940–1941	2005	

== Future non-conference opponents ==
Announced schedules as of March 30, 2026.

2026	2027	2028	2029	2030	2031	2032	2033
at Penn State	at Alabama	at Wisconsin	at Ohio	at Toledo	Toledo	Western Kentucky	Toledo
Middle Tennessee	at Ohio	Ohio		Austin Peay	at Western Kentucky	at Toledo	
at Missouri State	Boise State	Central Connecticut			Eastern Michigan		
Gardner–Webb	Bowling Green	at Eastern Michigan					
