= 1998 MAC Championship Game =

- Conference Championship
Toledo Rockets	Marshall Thundering Herd
(7–4)	(10–1)
17	23
Head coach: Gary Pinkel	Head coach: Bob Pruett
	1	2	3	4	Total
Toledo	7	0	0	10	17
Marshall	6	0	0	17	23
- Date: December 4, 1998
- Season: 1998
- Stadium: Marshall Stadium
- Location: Huntington, West Virginia
- MVP: QB Chad Pennington (Marshall)
- Favorite: Marshall by 12
- Attendance: 28,085

United States TV coverage
- Network: ESPN2

1998 Mid-American Conference football standings
	Conf.			Overall
Team	W		L	W		L
East Division
Marshall xy$	7	–	1	12	–	1
Miami (OH) x	7	–	1	10	–	1
Bowling Green	5	–	3	5	–	6
Ohio	5	–	3	5	–	6
Akron	3	–	6	4	–	7
Kent State	0	–	8	0	–	11
West Division
Toledo x	6	–	2	7	–	5
Western Michigan	5	–	3	7	–	4
Central Michigan	5	–	3	6	–	5
Eastern Michigan	3	–	6	3	–	8
Northern Illinois	2	–	6	2	–	9
Ball State	1	–	7	1	–	10
Championship: Marshall 23, Toledo 17
$ – Conference champion; x – Division champion/co-champions; y – Championship game participant

The 1998 MAC Championship Game was the second conference championship game of the Mid-American Conference, and was played on December 4, 1998, at Marshall Stadium, now known as Joan C. Edwards Stadium, in Huntington, West Virginia. The game featured a rematch of the 1997 game, between the East Division's Marshall Thundering Herd, and the West Division's Toledo Rockets. Marshall was heavily favored to win the game. Marshall defeated Toledo to claim their second consecutive conference title by a score of 23–17. During the game, Marshall starting quarterback Chad Pennington was hurt, and was replaced by Byron Leftwich.
