= Chad Pennington =

American football player (born 1976)

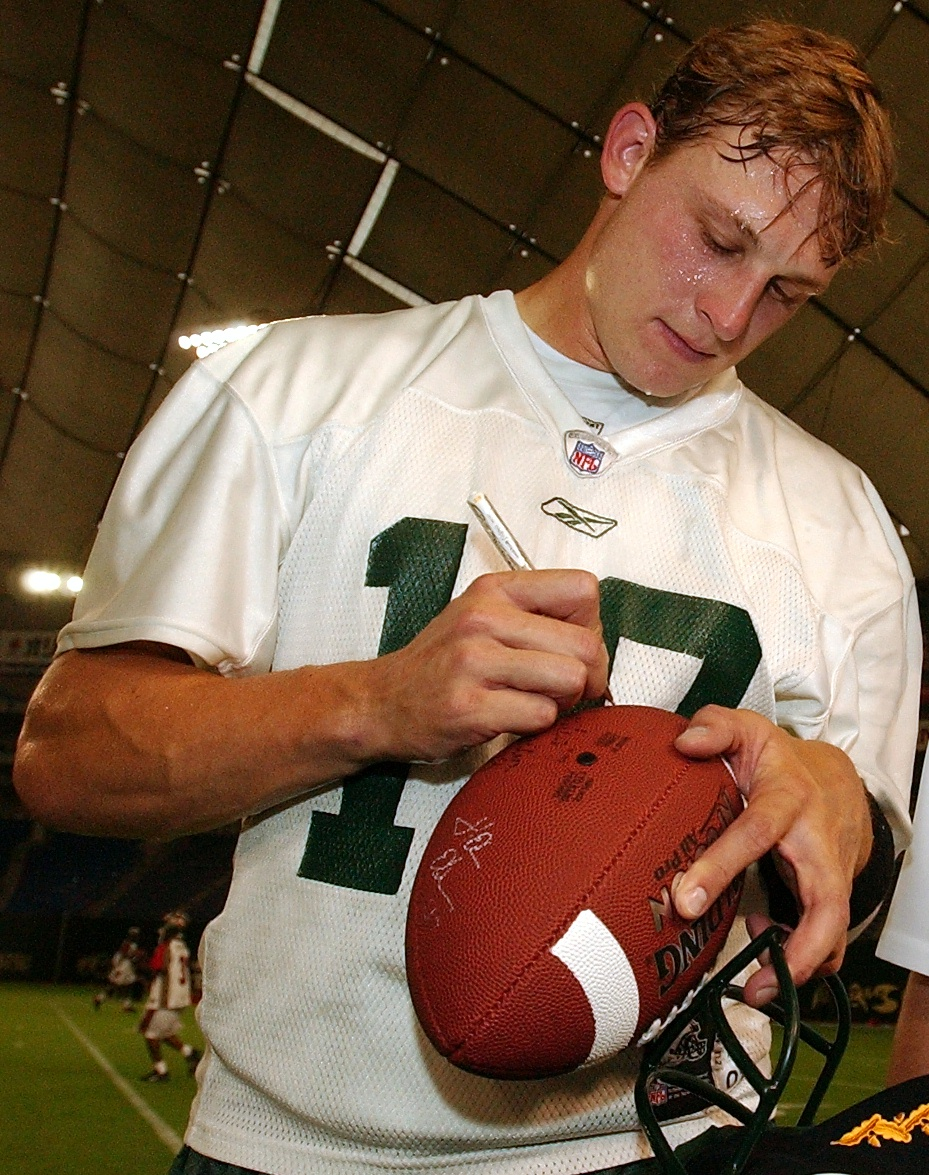
- Pennington with the New York Jets in 2003

No. 10
- Position: Quarterback

Personal information
- Born: June 26, 1976 (age 50); Knoxville, Tennessee, U.S.
- Listed height: 6 ft 3 in (1.91 m)
- Listed weight: 225 lb (102 kg)

Career information
- High school: Webb School (Knoxville)
- College: Marshall (1995–1999)
- NFL draft: 2000: 1st round, 18th overall pick

Career history

Playing
- New York Jets (2000–2007); Miami Dolphins (2008–2010)

Coaching
- Sayre School (2018–present) Head coach

Awards and highlights
- 2× NFL Comeback Player of the Year (2006, 2008); 2× NFL completion percentage leader (2002, 2008); NFL passer rating leader (2002); NCAA I-AA national champion (1996); Sammy Baugh Trophy (1999); William V. Campbell Trophy (1999); 2× NCAA passing touchdowns leader (1997, 1999); NCAA completion percentage leader (1999); MAC Most Valuable Player (1999); MAC Offensive Player of the Year (1999); 3× First-team All-MAC (1997, 1998, 1999)

Career NFL statistics
- Passing attempts: 2,471
- Passing completions: 1,632
- Completion percentage: 66.0%
- TD–INT: 102–64
- Passing yards: 17,823
- Passer rating: 90.1
- Stats at Pro Football Reference

James Chadwick Pennington (born June 26, 1976) is an American former professional football quarterback who played in the National Football League (NFL) for 11 seasons. He played college football for the Marshall Thundering Herd, winning the Sammy Baugh Trophy and MAC Offensive Player of the Year in 1999 after leading the NCAA in passing touchdowns and completion percentage. Pennington was selected in the first round of the 2000 NFL draft by the New York Jets, where he spent his first eight seasons. In his final three seasons, he was a member of the Miami Dolphins.

Pennington helped clinch a division title with the Jets in 2002 and the Dolphins in 2008, both of which are the most recent for either franchise. He also led the league in completion percentage during both seasons and in passer rating during the former. Pennington was the first player to win NFL Comeback Player of the Year multiple times, receiving the award in 2006 and 2008. At the time of his retirement, he held the NFL record for completion percentage. Since 2018, he has served as the head football coach of the Sayre School.

== Early life ==
Pennington is a native of Tennessee. His father, Elwood, was a physical education teacher and football coach at Halls High School, and his mother, Denise, a teacher at the Webb School of Knoxville, both in Knoxville. Both of Pennington's parents are of English descent. Pennington's first sport was basketball, which he began playing in the third grade. He began playing football in his freshman year in high school. His parents decided to have him repeat the eighth grade when he was enrolled at the Webb School of Knoxville due to the school's intense academic program. He played basketball and football at Webb, but knew he had a better chance at getting into college via football.

Pennington was recruited by only two colleges, Middle Tennessee State University and the University of Tennessee at Chattanooga. In 1995, he went to a training camp at Marshall University, his parents' alma mater, where he was noticed by head football coach Jim Donnan and offered a scholarship.

== College career ==
Originally the Thundering Herd's fourth-string quarterback in 1995 and slated to be redshirted, Pennington led Marshall to the 1995 NCAA Division I-AA Football Championship Game, which Marshall lost to Montana, 22–20. The following year, Pennington was redshirted in favor of Eric Kresser, a transfer from the Florida Gators, who guided the Herd's return to the I-AA Championship game (a victory) in 1996. Pennington returned to play in 1997 as Marshall moved from Division I-AA to Division I-A, and led the nation in passing touchdowns with 39. He led Marshall to the school's first bowl game victory in a 48–29 rout of Louisville in the 1998 Motor City Bowl. Pennington was named the game's MVP. In his senior year (1999), Pennington led the NCAA in completion percentage (67.9%) and again in passing touchdowns (37). Marshall went undefeated at 13–0 as Pennington led the team to its third consecutive Mid-American Conference championship. Pennington and Marshall returned to Pontiac, Michigan for the 1999 Motor City Bowl, where they won, 21–3, over BYU, capping Pennington's undefeated senior season.

Pennington set school records in several passing categories. He finished fifth in 1999 Heisman Trophy voting. Randy Moss was Pennington's top receiver at Marshall. Pennington finished his career at Marshall with 1,026 of 1,619 completions for 13,423 yards and 115 touchdowns with only 45 interceptions.

In addition to his success on the football field, Pennington excelled academically, graduating with a degree in journalism, a 3.83 grade point average and becoming a finalist for the Rhodes Scholarship. He wrote frequently for Marshall's newspaper The Parthenon and was a broadcaster for the school's radio station WMUL, although he used a pseudonym on air so as not to be distracting.

== Professional career ==
Pre-draft measurables
Height	Weight	Arm length	Hand span	40-yard dash	10-yard split	20-yard split	20-yard shuttle	Three-cone drill	Vertical jump	Broad jump	Wonderlic
6 ft 3 3/8 in (1.91 m)	229 lb (104 kg)	32 3/4 in (0.83 m)	10 1/4 in (0.26 m)	4.81 s	1.61 s	2.77 s	4.16 s	7.12 s	33.5 in (0.85 m)	9 ft 3 in (2.82 m)	25
All values from NFL Combine

=== New York Jets ===
==== 2000–2003 ====
Pennington was selected by the New York Jets in the first round of the 2000 NFL draft, 18th overall and the first quarterback taken.

After making only three appearances during his first two seasons, Pennington emerged as the Jets' starting quarterback after filling in for Vinny Testaverde during the fifth game of the 2002 season. Pennington helped reverse the Jets' fortunes by leading the 1–4 team to an eventual 9–7 record and an AFC East division championship. Despite starting less than a full season, Pennington threw for 3,120 yards with 22 touchdowns and six interceptions. His 104.2 quarterback rating set a team record. In the Wild Card game, Pennington threw for a 142 QB rating, leading the Jets over Peyton Manning and the number four passing offense of the Indianapolis Colts.

After their 2002 performance, Pennington and the Jets were given lofty expectations entering the 2003 pre-season; however, in the fourth pre-season game against the New York Giants, Pennington endured a fracture-dislocation on his left (non-throwing) hand after suffering a hit from linebacker Brandon Short. The injury forced him to miss the first six games of the season. Due to the severity of the injury, and a rushed rehab process, Pennington's wrist would never be the same, and his once outstanding play-fake became thoroughly ordinary. Without their starting quarterback, the Jets began the season 1–4. Despite his return, the Jets only won five more games to finish 6–10.

==== 2004 season ====
Into the 2004 season, the Jets signed Pennington to a team-record contract for seven years and $64.2 million and Pennington led the Jets to a 5–0 record. However, during a Week 9 game against the Buffalo Bills, Pennington injured his rotator cuff and subsequently missed three games. Second string quarterback Quincy Carter was 2–1 in Pennington's absence. After returning to action with a rout of the Houston Texans. Despite a scuffle with the New York media and losses to the New England Patriots and the St. Louis Rams, the Jets earned a wild card berth with a 10–6 record. Pennington then led the Jets to a first-round, 20–17 overtime win against the AFC West Champion San Diego Chargers, as he went 23–33, for 279 yards and two touchdowns. Pennington and the Jets then faced the 15–1 Steelers at Pittsburgh. Despite the Jets' offensive struggles and facing a 10–0 deficit, the Jets defense and special teams rallied to score 17 unanswered points. However, Pennington and the Jets would see their season end with kicker Doug Brien missing two potential game-winning field goals that head coach Herm Edwards played into very conservatively. The Steelers went on to win in overtime.

Pennington feuded with the local New York media throughout the season. During a news conference on December 20, 2004, Pennington scolded the assembled media, telling them it was 'not (their) right' but a 'privilege' of theirs to cover the Jets, 'to be around a bunch of professional athletes every day and do your job'.

==== 2005 season ====
Pennington underwent surgery on his right shoulder in Birmingham, Alabama on February 4, 2005. It was later revealed that he had suffered a substantial tear in the right rotator cuff, as well as a large bone spur on that shoulder. A dismal performance against the Kansas City Chiefs in September and a lackluster one against the Miami Dolphins the following week led to speculation that the shoulder had yet to fully heal, but both Pennington and Jets coach Herman Edwards denied this, citing a lack of pre-season practice and Pennington's less-than-full grasp of new offensive coordinator Mike Heimerdinger's plays. On September 25, 2005, against the Jacksonville Jaguars, Pennington once again suffered an injury, although he re-entered the game later and almost led the Jets to victory despite not throwing well. However, tests later showed another tear in his rotator cuff.

On October 6, 2005, Pennington once again underwent surgery to repair his right shoulder. Pennington and the Jets expected that with more rehabilitation time than his first surgery, he would have better strength and control with his throws entering the 2006 season. In the midst of the eventually-resolved labor talks of February–March 2006, Pennington restructured his contract with the New York Jets to ensure he remained with the team for at least the 2006 season. Pennington was reported to have taken a significant cut in pay, with the amounts lost recoverable by way of achievable incentives; however, the Jets organization did not comment on contractual issues.

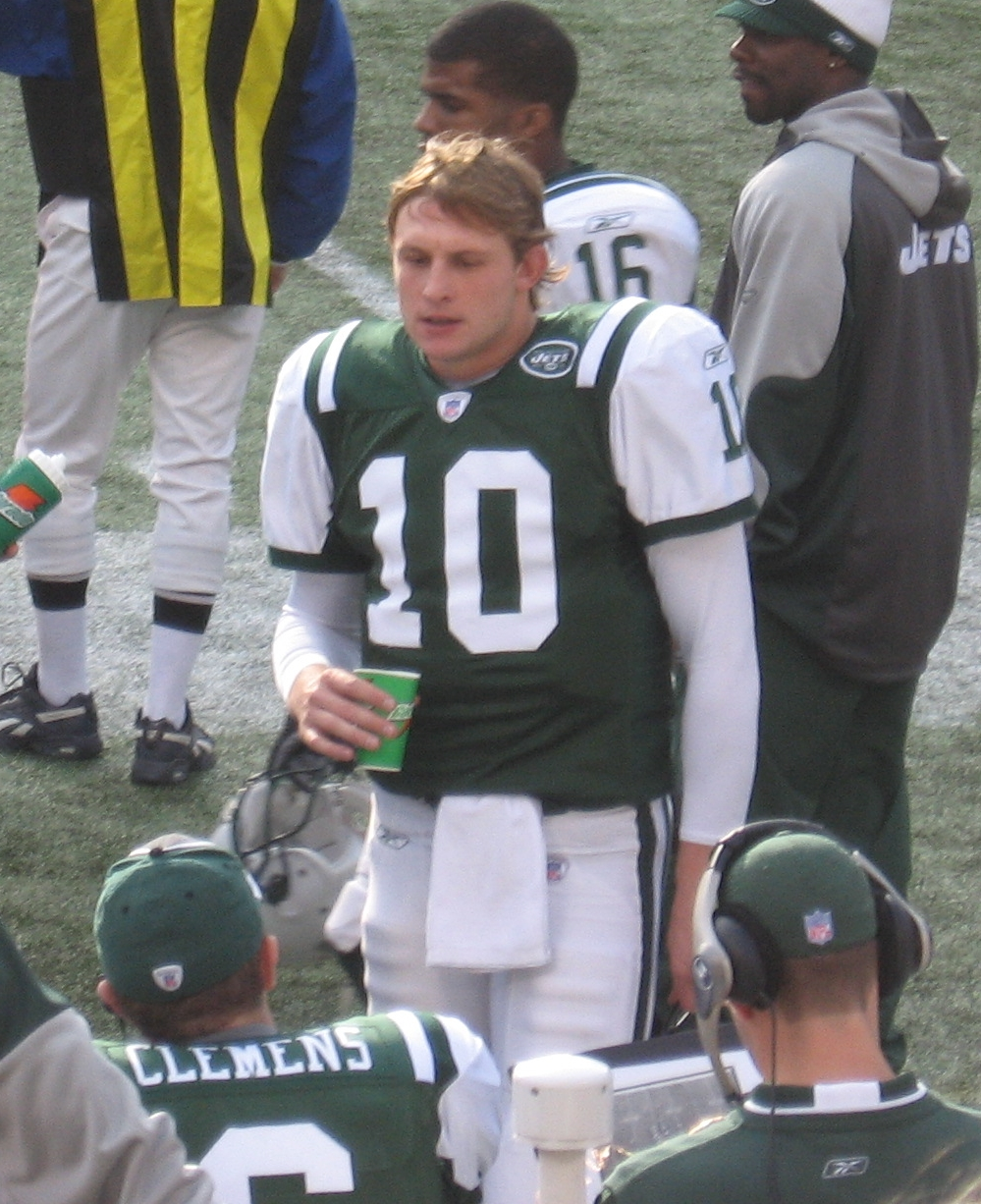
Pennington with the Jets in 2006.

==== 2006 season ====
Entering the 2006 season, Pennington trained with new throwing coaches, and worked significantly on the strength of his torso and throwing mechanics. During training camp, new head coach Eric Mangini told players and the press that the quarterback position was still uncertain, and that all four Jets quarterbacks (Chad Pennington, Patrick Ramsey, Brooks Bollinger, and Kellen Clemens) had a chance to be the starter. The Jets medical staff limited Pennington's throws to ensure the safety of his shoulder.

Pennington won the Jets pre-season quarterback competition, and started the 2006 season in pre-injury form. In the first two weeks of the season, and for the first time in his career, Pennington posted back-to-back 300-yard passing games. Pennington's Week One performance against the Tennessee Titans earned him AFC Offensive Player of the Week honors. In Week 15 in Minnesota, Pennington passed for a career-high 339 yards.

Pennington reached career highs for completions, passing attempts, and passing yardage with 3,352 yards, starting all sixteen games.

Although his lack of arm strength was often criticized, Pennington's abilities fit well with the new offense instituted by offensive coordinator Brian Schottenheimer. Using a short passing game and taking advantage of the "yards after catch" ability of wide receivers Laveranues Coles, Jerricho Cotchery, and running back Leon Washington, Pennington led the Jets to a 10–6 record and a playoff berth as a wild card team, a significant improvement over their 4–12 mark in 2005.

The Jets took on the New England Patriots in their lone playoff game. The Jets lost 37–16, with Pennington passing for 300 yards and a touchdown. With the start, Pennington also became the Jets' all-time leader in postseason starts by a quarterback with five.

For his stellar season, Pennington was awarded the Comeback Player of the Year Award, just one year after tearing his rotator cuff. He received 27 of the 50 votes cast, finishing far ahead of the 8.5 votes received by second-place finisher Drew Brees.

==== 2007 season ====
The 2007 season was a tumultuous one for Pennington. In the first game of the season, against the Patriots, Pennington suffered a high ankle sprain that kept him out of game two. In the third game, against the Miami Dolphins, he led the Jets to a 31–28 victory, throwing two touchdowns and running for a third. After a 17–14 loss to the Buffalo Bills in Week 4, he threw three interceptions against the New York Giants in Week 5, giving him five interceptions in two games. Two weeks later, he threw a costly interception late in the fourth quarter against the Cincinnati Bengals. After leading the Jets to a dismal 1–7 start, coach Eric Mangini decided to bench Pennington for second-year quarterback Kellen Clemens. Clemens suffered a rib injury during a Week 15 matchup against the Patriots, resulting in Pennington's return to game action. Pennington finished the game completing 25 of 38 pass attempts for 184 yards. He also threw for more yards and fewer interceptions than opposing quarterback Tom Brady, who was on his way to an MVP season, but that day was 14–27 for 140 yards with one interception. Pennington started the next week at Tennessee, where the Jets lost 6–10. Clemens replaced Pennington for the final game of the season against the Kansas City Chiefs. Pennington finished the 2007 season with 1,765 yards, 10 touchdowns, 9 interceptions and a passer rating of 86.1.

In 2008, upon entering training camp, Eric Mangini announced a competition for the starting quarterback position between Pennington and Clemens. However, on August 7, 2008, the Jets acquired veteran and former Green Bay Packers quarterback Brett Favre, leading to Pennington's release later that day.

=== Miami Dolphins ===
==== 2008 season ====
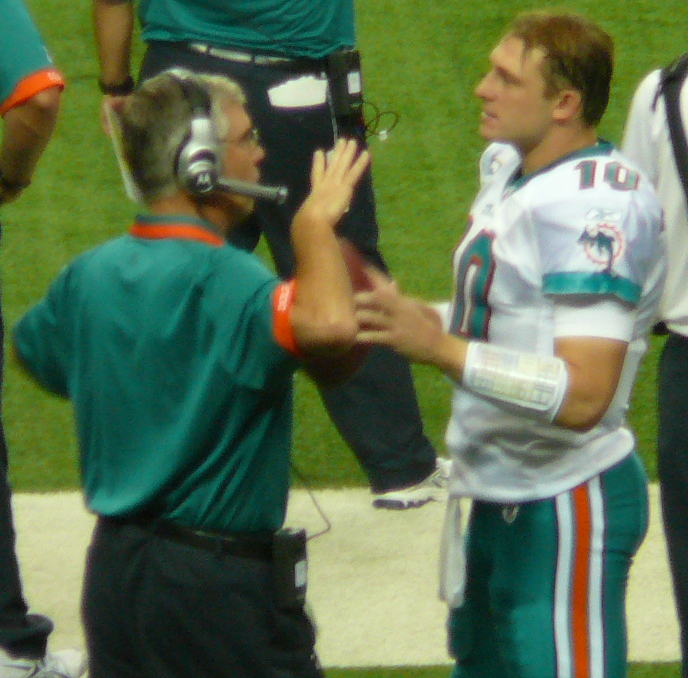
Pennington (right) with Miami Dolphins quarterbacks coach David Lee in 2009.

Upon his release from the Jets, it was reported that at least six teams were interested in Pennington. However, only the Minnesota Vikings and the Miami Dolphins were considered as serious contenders. On August 8, Pennington signed a two-year, $11.5 million deal with the Dolphins. Dolphins head coach Tony Sparano said that Pennington would have to compete for the starting job. He was later announced as the starting quarterback as the Dolphins moved into the regular season. His 67.4 completion percentage led the NFL and broke Miami's single-season record of 64.2 set by Dan Marino in 1984. He finished the season with a passer rating of 97.4, started all sixteen games for the Dolphins, and led them to an 11–5 record (including winning 9 of their last 10 games) and the third seed in the playoffs with an AFC East Championship. The Dolphins went on to lose to the Baltimore Ravens in the first round of the playoffs, 27–9. He was the first Dolphins quarterback since Hall of Famer Dan Marino to throw for 3,500 yards. For his role in the Dolphins' ten-win turnaround, Pennington received notable MVP consideration from several major media outlets. He received four votes, and finished tied for second with running back Michael Turner for the 2008 AP NFL MVP. The winner of the award, Peyton Manning, received 32 votes.

At the completion of the regular season, Pennington was awarded his second Comeback Player of the Year Award.

==== 2009 season ====
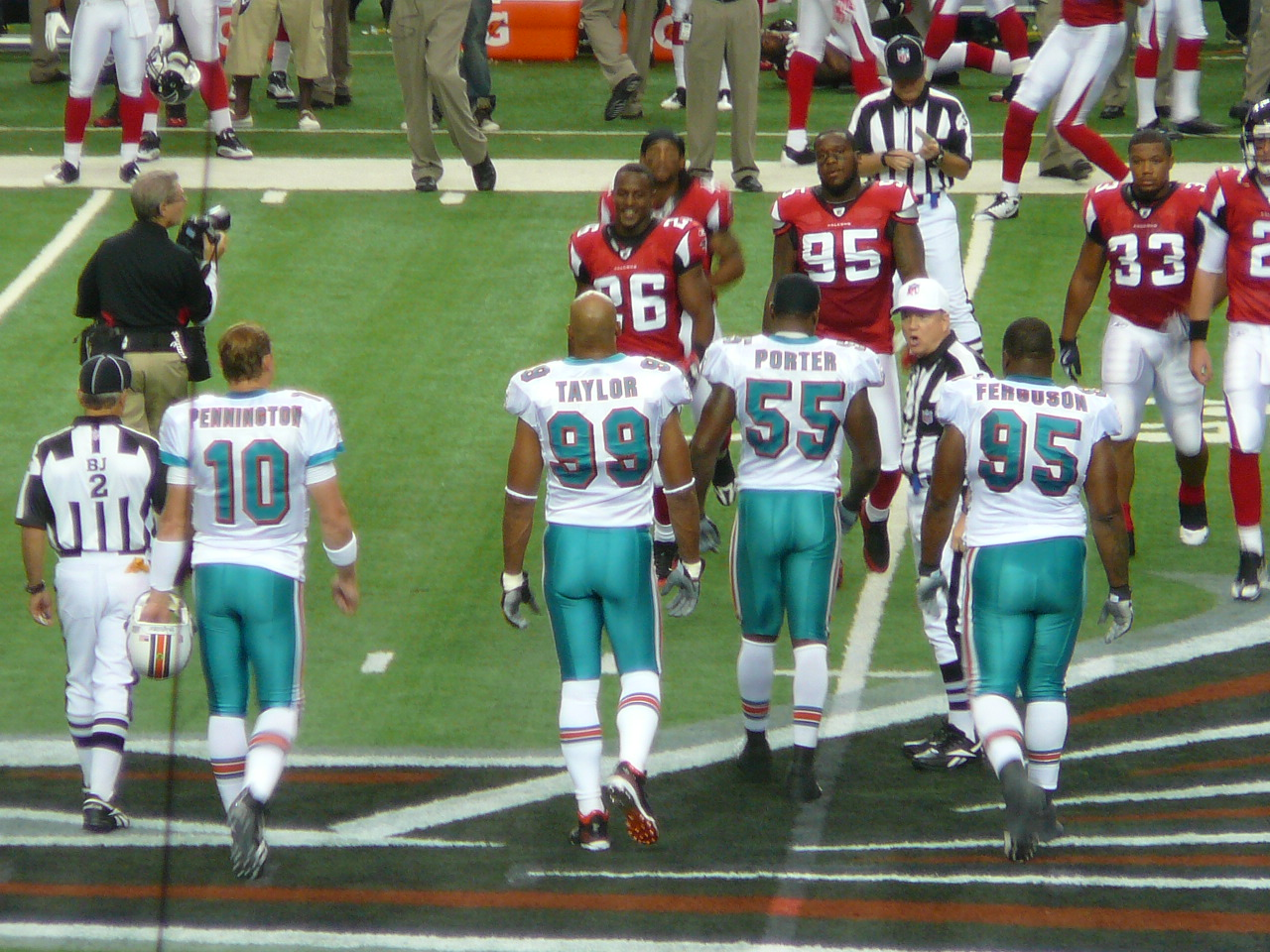
Pennington (#10) with fellow 2009 Dolphins team captains Jason Taylor, Joey Porter and Jason Ferguson.

Pennington was the starter for the Miami Dolphins 2009 season, with Chad Henne as the second string, and Pat White as the third string. On September 27, 2009, against the San Diego Chargers, during the third quarter Pennington injured the same shoulder on which he had two previous surgeries. Chad Henne served as his replacement in the 23–13 loss.

On September 28, Pennington went in for an MRI amidst speculation of a season-ending injury. On September 29, 2009, it was announced that initial results show a torn capsule in his throwing shoulder. After seeking a second opinion, Pennington decided to go with a third surgery on the shoulder. Pennington later said that although he was not sure if he would play again, he would try and rehabilitate the shoulder and work on getting back to the NFL. He was officially placed on injured reserve and the Dolphins acquired Tyler Thigpen from the Chiefs for an undisclosed 2010 draft pick.

==== 2010 season ====
On March 5, 2010, Pennington was re-signed by the Dolphins to a one-year deal. The deal would pay him $5.75 million if he had started, $4.2 million if he had been traded by the team, or $2.5 million as a back-up to Chad Henne.

On November 10, 2010, Pennington was named the starting quarterback for the November 14 game against the Titans. On his second play, Pennington suffered a severe shoulder injury. The injury was considered potentially career-ending.

==== 2011 season ====
Pennington attempted another comeback to the NFL in 2011. However, on March 31, 2011, he tore his ACL while playing a game of pick-up basketball. Pennington announced that he would work for Fox Sports as an analyst during the 2011 NFL season. On February 9, 2012, he announced he would retire rather than attempt a comeback following his fourth shoulder surgery.

== Career statistics ==
Legend
	Led the league
**Bold**	Career high

=== NFL ===
==== Regular season ====
Year	Team	Games			Passing								Rushing				Sacks		Fumbles	
Year	Team	GP	GS	Record	Cmp	Att	Pct	Yds	Avg	TD	Int	Rtg	Att	Yds	Avg	TD	Sck	SckY	Fum	Lost
2000	NYJ	1	0	—	2	5	40.0	67	**13.4**	1	0	**127.1**	1	0	0.0	0	1	4	0	0
2001	NYJ	2	0	—	10	20	50.0	92	4.6	1	0	79.6	1	11	**11.0**	0	1	8	0	0
2002	NYJ	15	12	8–4	275	399	**68.9**	3,120	7.8	**22**	6	104.2	29	49	1.7	**2**	22	135	2	1
2003	NYJ	10	9	4–5	189	297	63.6	2,139	7.2	13	12	82.9	21	42	2.0	**2**	25	160	**8**	2
2004	NYJ	13	13	8–5	242	370	65.4	2,673	7.2	16	9	91.0	34	**126**	3.7	1	18	103	5	2
2005	NYJ	3	3	1–2	49	83	59.0	530	6.4	2	3	70.9	6	27	4.5	0	9	52	**8**	2
2006	NYJ	16	16	10–6	**313**	**485**	64.5	3,352	6.9	17	**16**	82.6	**35**	109	3.1	0	**30**	172	7	**4**
2007	NYJ	9	8	1–7	179	260	68.8	1,765	6.8	10	9	86.1	20	32	1.6	1	26	**178**	5	0
2008	MIA	16	16	**11–5**	321	476	67.4	**3,653**	7.7	19	7	97.4	30	62	2.1	1	24	121	3	1
2009	MIA	3	3	0–3	51	74	**68.9**	413	5.6	1	2	76.0	3	7	2.3	0	6	32	3	2
2010	MIA	1	1	1–0	1	2	50.0	19	9.5	0	0	83.3	0	0	—	0	0	0	0	0
Career		89	81	44–37	1,632	2,471	66.0	17,823	7.2	102	64	90.1	180	465	2.6	7	162	965	41	14

==== Postseason ====
Year	Team	Games			Passing								Rushing				Sacks		Fumbles	
Year	Team	GP	GS	Record	Cmp	Att	Pct	Yds	Avg	TD	Int	Rtg	Att	Yds	Avg	TD	Sck	SckY	Fum	Lost
2001	NYJ	0	0	did not play																
2002	NYJ	2	2	**1–1**	40	**72**	55.6	405	5.6	**4**	2	78.8	3	6	2.0	0	**6**	22	**2**	0
2004	NYJ	2	2	**1–1**	**44**	66	**66.7**	**461**	7.0	2	1	**90.5**	**5**	**13**	**2.6**	0	5	26	0	0
2006	NYJ	1	1	0–1	23	40	57.5	300	**7.5**	1	1	79.2	2	1	0.5	0	3	22	1	**1**
2008	MIA	1	1	0–1	25	38	65.8	252	6.6	1	**4**	53.7	1	0	0.0	0	3	**28**	1	0
Career		6	6	2–4	132	216	61.1	1,418	6.6	8	8	77.3	11	20	1.8	0	17	98	4	1

=== College ===
Season	Team	Games			Passing						
Season	Team	GP	GS	Record	Cmp	Att	Pct	Yards	TD	Int	Rtg
1995	Marshall	14	12	10–2	219	354	61.9	2,445	15	**15**	125.4
1996	Marshall	Redshirt (redshirt)									
1997	Marshall	13	13	10–3	276	**473**	58.4	3,817	**42**	12	150.4
1998	Marshall	13	13	12–1	**297**	456	65.1	3,830	28	7	152.9
1999	Marshall	13	13	**13–0**	292	433	**67.4**	**4,006**	38	12	**168.6**
Total		53	51	45–6	1,084	1,716	63.2	14,098	123	46	150.5

Includes statistics from 1995 when Marshall competed in Division I-AA. Includes 1997 Motor City Bowl, 1998 Motor City Bowl and 1999 Motor City Bowl stats.

== Career highlights ==
NFL

- 2× NFL Comeback Player of the Year (2006, 2008)
- 2× NFL completion percentage leader (2002, 2008)
- NFL passer rating leader (2002)
- 47th "Perfect Game" in NFL History (on November 16, 2003, vs Indianapolis Colts)
- 2× PFWA NFL Comeback Player of the Year (2006, 2008)
- PFWA Most Improved Player of the Year (2002)

College

- NCAA I-AA national champion (1996)
- Sammy Baugh Trophy (1999)
- William V. Campbell Trophy (1999)
- 2× NCAA passing touchdowns leader (1997, 1999)
- NCAA completion percentage leader (1999)
- MAC Most Valuable Player (1999)
- MAC Offensive Player of the Year (1999)
- 3× First-team All-MAC (1997, 1998, 1999)

== Personal life ==
Pennington married his college girlfriend, Robin Hampton, on March 1, 2001. He famously brought his Jets' playbook on his honeymoon. The couple have three sons together, one of whom, Cole, spent three seasons as a quarterback on the Marshall football roster before transferring to Gardner–Webb after the 2024 season. Pennington and his family currently reside in Woodford County, Kentucky.

=== 1st and 10 Foundation ===
Chad and Robin Pennington created the 1st and 10 Foundation in 2003 with the mission to build stronger communities by funding programs and institutions that seek to improve quality of life throughout West Virginia, Tennessee, and the New York metropolitan area. Since its inception in 2003, the foundation has given more than half a million dollars to different charitable organizations.

=== Stock contractor ===
Pennington created #10 Bucking Bulls with partner JW Hart. He hauled bulls to the PBR Finals several times, with the most famous being #121, Cat Man Do.

=== High school football coaching ===
In 2018, Pennington was hired to be the head coach at Lexington, Kentucky's Sayre School, which was restarting a football program after a 40-year absence. In his first year of coaching, he led the team to a 3–5 record while playing a junior varsity schedule; the team was promoted to full varsity status in 2020. In 2024, Pennington led the Spartans to their first Kentucky Class 1A (Note: The Kentucky High School Athletic Association divides its football-playing members into six enrollment-based classes, with Sayre's class, known by the KHSAA as "1A" but by most state media as "A", consisting of the smallest schools.) state championship with a 27–22 victory over the Raceland Rams, with another of his sons, Luke, as the Spartans' starting quarterback.

== See also ==
- List of NCAA Division I FBS quarterbacks with at least 90 career passing touchdowns
- List of NCAA major college football yearly passing leaders
