= 1998 Bowling Green Falcons football team =

American college football season

1998 Bowling Green Falcons football
- Conference: Mid-American Conference
- East Division
- Record: 5–6 (5–3 MAC)
- Head coach: Gary Blackney (8th season)
- Offensive coordinator: Mike Faragalli (3rd season)
- Defensive coordinator: Tim Beckman (1st season)
- Home stadium: Doyt Perry Stadium

1998 Mid-American Conference football standings
	Conf.			Overall
Team	W		L	W		L
East Division
Marshall xy$	7	–	1	12	–	1
Miami (OH) x	7	–	1	10	–	1
Bowling Green	5	–	3	5	–	6
Ohio	5	–	3	5	–	6
Akron	3	–	6	4	–	7
Kent State	0	–	8	0	–	11
West Division
Toledo x	6	–	2	7	–	5
Western Michigan	5	–	3	7	–	4
Central Michigan	5	–	3	6	–	5
Eastern Michigan	3	–	6	3	–	8
Northern Illinois	2	–	6	2	–	9
Ball State	1	–	7	1	–	10
Championship: Marshall 23, Toledo 17
$ – Conference champion; x – Division champion/co-champions; y – Championship game participant

The 1998 Bowling Green Falcons football team was an American football team that represented Bowling Green University in the Mid-American Conference (MAC) during the 1998 NCAA Division I-A football season. In their eighth season under head coach Gary Blackney, the Falcons compiled a 5–6 record (5–3 against MAC opponents), finished in a tie for third place in the MAC East Division, and were outscored by all opponents by a combined total of 312 to 292.

The team's statistical leaders included Bob Niemet with 949 passing yards, Godfrey Lewis with 753 rushing yards, and Kurt Gerling with 656 receiving yards.

== Schedule ==
Date	Opponent	Site	Result	Attendance	Source
September 5	at Missouri*	Faurot Field; Columbia, MO	L 0–37	48,971	
September 12	at No. 9 Penn State*	Beaver Stadium; University Park, PA	L 3–48	96,291	
September 26	UCF*	Doyt Perry Stadium; Bowling Green, OH	L 31–38	15,824	
October 3	Ohio	Doyt Perry Stadium; Bowling Green, OH	W 35–7		
October 10	at Miami (OH)	Yager Stadium; Oxford, OH	L 12–24		
October 17	at Toledo	Glass Bowl; Toledo, OH (rivalry)	L 16–24		
October 24	Kent State	Doyt Perry Stadium; Bowling Green, OH (Anniversary Award)	W 42–21		
October 31	Marshall	Doyt Perry Stadium; Bowling Green, OH	W 34–13	11,237	
November 7	Akron	Doyt Perry Stadium; Bowling Green, OH	W 58–21		
November 14	at Western Michigan	Waldo Stadium; Kalamazoo, MI	L 27–56		
November 21	at Northern Illinois	Huskie Stadium; DeKalb, IL	W 34–23	11,380	
*Non-conference game; Rankings from AP Poll released prior to the game
