= 1998 Eastern Michigan Eagles football team =

American college football season

1998 Eastern Michigan Eagles football
- Conference: Mid-American Conference
- Record: 3–8 (3–6 MAC)
- Head coach: Rick Rasnick (4th season)
- Offensive coordinator: Todd Monken (1st season)
- Defensive coordinator: Sam Gruneisen (4th season)
- MVP: L. J. Shelton
- Captains: L. J. Shelton; Justin Ventura; Derek Vitatoe
- Home stadium: Rynearson Stadium

1998 Mid-American Conference football standings
	Conf.			Overall
Team	W		L	W		L
East Division
Marshall xy$	7	–	1	12	–	1
Miami (OH) x	7	–	1	10	–	1
Bowling Green	5	–	3	5	–	6
Ohio	5	–	3	5	–	6
Akron	3	–	6	4	–	7
Kent State	0	–	8	0	–	11
West Division
Toledo x	6	–	2	7	–	5
Western Michigan	5	–	3	7	–	4
Central Michigan	5	–	3	6	–	5
Eastern Michigan	3	–	6	3	–	8
Northern Illinois	2	–	6	2	–	9
Ball State	1	–	7	1	–	10
Championship: Marshall 23, Toledo 17
$ – Conference champion; x – Division champion/co-champions; y – Championship game participant

The 1998 Eastern Michigan Eagles football team represented Eastern Michigan University in the 1998 NCAA Division I-A football season. In their fourth season under head coach Rick Rasnick, the Eagles compiled a 3–8 record (3–6 against conference opponents), finished in fourth place in the West Division of the Mid-American Conference, and were outscored by their opponents, 309 to 216. The team's statistical leaders included Walter Church with 2,650 passing yards, Eric Powell with 473 rushing yards, and Jermaine Sheffield with 953 receiving yards. L. J. Shelton received the team's most valuable player award.

== Schedule ==
Date	Time	Opponent	Site	TV	Result	Attendance	Source
September 3	6:00 p.m.	No. 5 Northern Iowa*	Rynearson Stadium; Ypsilanti, MI		L 10–13	12,305	
September 12		at Ball State	Scheumann Stadium; Muncie, IN		W 13–7		
September 19	12:00 p.m.	at Michigan*	Michigan Stadium; Ann Arbor, MI	ESPN Plus	L 20–59	110,438	
September 26		Marshall	Rynearson Stadium; Ypsilanti, MI		L 23–26	13,611	
October 3		at Kent State	Dix Stadium; Kent, OH		W 26–17		
October 10		Central Michigan ^{†}	Rynearson Stadium; Ypsilanti, MI (rivalry)		L 23–36 ^{OT}	17,423	
October 17		at Western Michigan	Waldo Stadium; Kalamazoo, MI		L 35–45		
October 24	6:00 p.m.	Northern Illinois	Rynearson Stadium; Ypsilanti, MI		L 14–26	8,423	
November 7		at Ohio	Peden Stadium; Athens, OH		L 21–49		
November 14		at Akron	Rubber Bowl; Akron, OH		L 21–24		
November 21		Toledo	Rynearson Stadium; Ypsilanti, MI		W 10–7		
*Non-conference game; ^{†}Homecoming; Rankings from Coaches' Poll released prior to the game; All times are in Eastern time

== After the season ==
The following Eagle was selected in the 1999 NFL draft after the season.

Round	Pick	Player	Position	NFL club
1	21	L. J. Shelton	Tackle	Arizona Cardinals
