= 1998 Ohio Bobcats football team =

American college football season

1998 Ohio Bobcats football
- Conference: Mid-American Conference
- East Division
- Record: 5–6 (5–3 MAC)
- Head coach: Jim Grobe (4th season)
- Offensive coordinator: Troy Calhoun (2nd season)
- Defensive coordinator: Tim DeRuyter (4th season)
- Home stadium: Peden Stadium

1998 Mid-American Conference football standings
	Conf.			Overall
Team	W		L	W		L
East Division
Marshall xy$	7	–	1	12	–	1
Miami (OH) x	7	–	1	10	–	1
Bowling Green	5	–	3	5	–	6
Ohio	5	–	3	5	–	6
Akron	3	–	6	4	–	7
Kent State	0	–	8	0	–	11
West Division
Toledo x	6	–	2	7	–	5
Western Michigan	5	–	3	7	–	4
Central Michigan	5	–	3	6	–	5
Eastern Michigan	3	–	6	3	–	8
Northern Illinois	2	–	6	2	–	9
Ball State	1	–	7	1	–	10
Championship: Marshall 23, Toledo 17
$ – Conference champion; x – Division champion/co-champions; y – Championship game participant

The 1998 Ohio Bobcats football team was an American football team that represented Ohio University in the Mid-American Conference (MAC) during the 1998 NCAA Division I-A football season. In their fourth season under head coach Jim Grobe, the Bobcats compiled a 5–6 record (5–3 against MAC opponents), finished in a tie for third place in the MAC's East Division, and were outscored by all opponents by a combined total of 303 to 269. They played their home games in Peden Stadium in Athens, Ohio.

== Schedule ==
Date	Opponent	Site	TV	Result	Attendance	Source
September 3	at NC State*	Carter–Finley Stadium; Raleigh, NC		L 31–34	35,500	
September 12	at No. 17 Wisconsin*	Camp Randall Stadium; Madison, WI	MSC	L 0–45	74,676	
September 19	East Carolina*	Peden Stadium; Athens, OH	WITN	L 14–21	19,186	
September 26	at Western Michigan	Waldo Stadium; Kalamazoo, MI		W 37–35		
October 3	at Bowling Green	Doyt Perry Stadium; Bowling Green, OH		L 7–35		
October 10	Marshall	Peden Stadium; Athens, OH (rivalry)		L 23–30	21,728	
October 17	Akron	Peden Stadium; Athens, OH		W 28–14		
October 31	at Miami (OH)	Yager Stadium; Oxford, OH (rivalry)		L 21–35		
November 7	Eastern Michigan	Peden Stadium; Athens, OH		W 49–21		
November 14	Northern Illinois	Peden Stadium; Athens, OH		W 28–12		
November 21	at Kent State	Dix Stadium; Kent, OH		W 31–21		
*Non-conference game; Rankings from AP Poll released prior to the game
