= 1998 Akron Zips football team =

American college football season

1998 Akron Zips football
- Conference: Mid-American Conference
- East Division
- Record: 4–7 (3–6 MAC)
- Head coach: Lee Owens (4th season)
- Offensive coordinator: Paul Winters (4th season)
- Defensive coordinator: Joe Palmisano (1st season)
- Home stadium: Rubber Bowl

1998 Mid-American Conference football standings
| | Conf. | | | Overall |
| Team | W | | L | W | | L |
|---|---|---|---|---|---|---|
East Division
| Marshall xy$ | 7 | – | 1 | 12 | – | 1 |
| Miami (OH) x | 7 | – | 1 | 10 | – | 1 |
| Bowling Green | 5 | – | 3 | 5 | – | 6 |
| Ohio | 5 | – | 3 | 5 | – | 6 |
| Akron | 3 | – | 6 | 4 | – | 7 |
| Kent State | 0 | – | 8 | 0 | – | 11 |
West Division
| Toledo x | 6 | – | 2 | 7 | – | 5 |
| Western Michigan | 5 | – | 3 | 7 | – | 4 |
| Central Michigan | 5 | – | 3 | 6 | – | 5 |
| Eastern Michigan | 3 | – | 6 | 3 | – | 8 |
| Northern Illinois | 2 | – | 6 | 2 | – | 9 |
| Ball State | 1 | – | 7 | 1 | – | 10 |
Championship: Marshall 23, Toledo 17
$ – Conference champion; x – Division champion/co-champions; y – Championship game participant

The 1998 Akron Zips football team represented Akron University in the 1998 NCAA Division I-A football season as members of the Mid-American Conference. They were led by fourth–year head coach Lee Owens. The Zips played their home games at the Rubber Bowl in Akron, Ohio. They finished the season with a record of 4–7, 3–6 in MAC play to finish in fifth place in the East Division.

== Schedule ==
| Date | Opponent | Site | Result | Attendance | Source |
|---|---|---|---|---|---|
| September 5 | Marshall | Rubber Bowl; Akron, OH | L 16–27 | 15,623 | |
| September 12 | at Temple* | Veterans Stadium; Philadelphia, PA | W 35–28 | | |
| September 26 | Ball State | Rubber Bowl; Akron, OH | W 52–14 | | |
| October 3 | at Pittsburgh* | Pitt Stadium; Pittsburgh, PA | L 0–35 | 37,357 | |
| October 10 | at Kent State | Dix Stadium; Kent, OH (Wagon Wheel) | W 45–16 | | |
| October 17 | at Ohio | Peden Stadium; Athens, OH | L 14–28 | | |
| October 24 | Toledo | Rubber Bowl; Akron, OH | L 17–24 | | |
| October 31 | at Central Michigan | Kelly/Shorts Stadium; Mount Pleasant, MI | L 27–28 | 14,789 | |
| November 7 | at Bowling Green | Doyt Perry Stadium; Bowling Green, OH | L 21–58 | | |
| November 14 | Eastern Michigan | Rubber Bowl; Akron, OH | W 24–21 | | |
| November 21 | Miami (OH) | Rubber Bowl; Akron, OH | L 14–20 | | |
*Non-conference game
