= Eric Kresser =

American football player (born 1973)

No. 15
- Position: Quarterback

Personal information
- Born: February 6, 1973 (age 53); Cincinnati, Ohio, U.S.
- Listed height: 6 ft 2 in (1.88 m)
- Listed weight: 209 lb (95 kg)

Career information
- High school: Palm Beach Gardens (Palm Beach Gardens, Florida)
- College: Florida (1993–1995); Marshall (1996)
- NFL draft: 1997: undrafted

Career history
- Cincinnati Bengals (1997–1999); Berlin Thunder (2000); Montreal Alouettes (2002)

Awards and highlights
- Grey Cup champion (2002); NCAA I-AA national champion (1996)

Career NFL statistics
- Passing attempts: 21
- Passing completions: 10
- Completion percentage: 47.6%
- TD–INT: 1–2
- Passing yards: 164
- Passer rating: 50.6
- Stats at Pro Football Reference

Eric Joel Kresser (born February 6, 1973) is an American former professional football player who was a quarterback for five seasons in the National Football League (NFL) and Canadian Football League (CFL) during the 1990s and early 2000s. Kresser played college football for the Florida Gators and Marshall Thundering Herd, and thereafter, he played professionally for the Cincinnati Bengals of the NFL and the Montreal Alouettes of the CFL.

== Early life ==
Kresser was born in Cincinnati, Ohio in 1973. He attended Palm Beach Gardens High School in Palm Beach Gardens, Florida, where he lettered in high school football, basketball and baseball for the Palm Beach Gardens Gators. Kresser received all-state honors in football.

== College career ==
Kresser accepted an athletic scholarship to attend the University of Florida in Gainesville, Florida, where he played for coach Steve Spurrier's Florida Gators football team from 1992 to 1995. Memorably, as a junior in 1995, Kresser threw for 458 yards and six touchdowns against the Northern Illinois Huskies, including a 96-yard touchdown pass to Gators wide receiver Jacquez Green.

After transferring to Marshall University for his senior year, Kresser became the starting quarterback for the 1996 Marshall Thundering Herd football team under coach Bob Pruett. With future NFL hall of famer, wide receiver Randy Moss, as his primary target, Kresser threw for 35 touchdowns and over 3,400 yards, while winning the Southern Conference championship. Marshall defeated the Montana Grizzlies 49–29 in the 1996 NCAA Division I-AA Football Championship Game, and ended the season with a perfect 15–0 record.

== Professional career ==
Kresser signed a rookie contract with the Cincinnati Bengals, where he spent his entire three-year NFL career.

In 2000, the Bengals sent Kresser to play for the Berlin Thunder. He started the first four games before injuring his right shoulder.

After sitting out the 2001 season, Kresser played for the Grey Cup champion Montreal Alouettes in the 2002 CFL season.
