= 1998 Western Michigan Broncos football team =

American college football season

1998 Western Michigan Broncos football
- Conference: Mid-American Conference
- West Division
- Record: 7–4 (5–4 MAC)
- Head coach: Gary Darnell (2nd season)
- Offensive coordinator: Bill Cubit (2nd season)
- Defensive coordinator: Chuck Driesbach (2nd season)
- MVP: Tim Lester
- Home stadium: Waldo Stadium

1998 Mid-American Conference football standings
	Conf.			Overall
Team	W		L	W		L
East Division
Marshall xy$	7	–	1	12	–	1
Miami (OH) x	7	–	1	10	–	1
Bowling Green	5	–	3	5	–	6
Ohio	5	–	3	5	–	6
Akron	3	–	6	4	–	7
Kent State	0	–	8	0	–	11
West Division
Toledo x	6	–	2	7	–	5
Western Michigan	5	–	3	7	–	4
Central Michigan	5	–	3	6	–	5
Eastern Michigan	3	–	6	3	–	8
Northern Illinois	2	–	6	2	–	9
Ball State	1	–	7	1	–	10
Championship: Marshall 23, Toledo 17
$ – Conference champion; x – Division champion/co-champions; y – Championship game participant

The 1998 Western Michigan Broncos football team represented Western Michigan University in the Mid-American Conference (MAC) during the 1998 NCAA Division I-A football season. In their second season under head coach Gary Darnell, the Broncos compiled a 7–4 record (5–3 against MAC opponents), finished in third place in the MAC's West Division, and outscored their opponents, 360 to 312. The team played its home games at Waldo Stadium in Kalamazoo, Michigan.

The team's statistical leaders included Tim Lester with 3,311 passing yards, Darnell Fields with 1,016 rushing yards, and Steve Neal with 1,121 receiving yards. Kicker Brad Selent was named the MAC special teams player of the year.

== Schedule ==
Date	Opponent	Site	Result	Attendance	Source
September 3	Northern Illinois	Waldo Stadium; Kalamazoo, MI	W 37–23	35,107	
September 12	at Indiana*	Memorial Stadium; Bloomington, IN	L 30–45	31,238	
September 19	at Toledo	Glass Bowl; Toledo, OH	L 7–35		
September 26	Ohio	Waldo Stadium; Kalamazoo, MI	L 35–37		
October 3	Northeast Louisiana*	Waldo Stadium; Kalamazoo, MI	W 27–14	15,037	
October 10	at Vanderbilt*	Vanderbilt Stadium; Nashville, TN	W 27–24	26,432	
October 17	Eastern Michigan	Waldo Stadium; Kalamazoo, MI	W 45–35		
October 24	at Central Michigan	Kelly/Shorts Stadium; Mount Pleasant, MI (rivalry)	L 24–26	29,841	
October 31	at Kent State	Dix Stadium; Kent, OH	W 48–23		
November 7	at Ball State	Ball State Stadium; Muncie, IN	W 24–23		
November 14	Bowling Green	Waldo Stadium; Kalamazoo, MI	W 56–27		
*Non-conference game
