= 1998 Northern Illinois Huskies football team =

American college football season

1998 Northern Illinois Huskies football
- Conference: Mid-American Conference
- West Division
- Record: 2–9 (2–6 MAC)
- Head coach: Joe Novak (3rd season)
- Offensive coordinator: Dan Roushar (1st season)
- MVPs: Duane Hawthorne; Deon Mitchell
- Captains: Perry Amoo; Orlando Bowen; Deon Mitchell
- Home stadium: Huskie Stadium

1998 Mid-American Conference football standings
	Conf.			Overall
Team	W		L	W		L
East Division
Marshall xy$	7	–	1	12	–	1
Miami (OH) x	7	–	1	10	–	1
Bowling Green	5	–	3	5	–	6
Ohio	5	–	3	5	–	6
Akron	3	–	6	4	–	7
Kent State	0	–	8	0	–	11
West Division
Toledo x	6	–	2	7	–	5
Western Michigan	5	–	3	7	–	4
Central Michigan	5	–	3	6	–	5
Eastern Michigan	3	–	6	3	–	8
Northern Illinois	2	–	6	2	–	9
Ball State	1	–	7	1	–	10
Championship: Marshall 23, Toledo 17
$ – Conference champion; x – Division champion/co-champions; y – Championship game participant

The 1998 Northern Illinois Huskies football team represented Northern Illinois University as a member of the West Division of the Mid-American Conference (MAC) during the 1998 NCAA Division I-A football season. Led by third-year head coach Joe Novak, the Huskies compiled an overall record of 2–9 with a mark of 2–6 in conference play, placing fifth in the MAC's West Division. Northern Illinois played home games at Huskie Stadium in DeKalb, Illinois. On October 17, the Huskies ended the longest active losing streak at the time, beating Central Michigan.

== Schedule ==
Date	Time	Opponent	Site	TV	Result	Attendance
September 3	7:30 pm	at Western Michigan	Waldo Stadium; Kalamazoo, MI		L 23–37	35,107
September 12	11:30 am	at No. 5 Kansas State*	KSU Stadium; Manhattan, KS	FSN	L 7–73	41,967
September 19	6:30 pm	Eastern Illinois*	Huskie Stadium; DeKalb, IL		L 10–24	20,184
October 3	1:00 pm	at Ball State	Ball State Stadium; Muncie, IN (rivalry)		L 13–18	16,829
October 10	5:00 pm	at UCF*	Florida Citrus Bowl; Orlando, FL		L 17–38	30,415
October 17	11:00 am	Central Michigan	Huskie Stadium; DeKalb, IL	FSN	W 16–6	15,012
October 24	5:00 pm	at Eastern Michigan	Rynearson Stadium; Ypsilanti, MI		W 26–14	8,423
October 31	11:00 am	Toledo	Huskie Stadium; DeKalb, IL	FSN	L 3–16	14,931
November 7	11:30 am	Miami (OH)	Huskie Stadium; DeKalb, IL		L 10–41	15,867
November 14	12:00 pm	at Ohio	Peden Stadium; Athens, OH		L 12–28	16,172
November 21	12:30 pm	Bowling Green	Huskie Stadium; DeKalb, IL		L 23–34	11,380
*Non-conference game; Rankings from AP Poll released prior to the game; All times are in Central time
