= 1998 Marshall Thundering Herd football team =

American college football season

1998 Marshall Thundering Herd football

MAC champion MAC East Division co-champion Motor City Bowl champion

MAC Championship Game, W 23–17 vs. Toledo

Motor City Bowl, W 48–29 vs. Louisville
- Conference: Mid-American Conference
- East Division
- Record: 12–1 (7–1 MAC)
- Head coach: Bob Pruett (3rd season)
- Co-offensive coordinators: Tony Petersen (1st season); Gunter Brewer (3rd season)
- Offensive scheme: Spread
- Defensive coordinator: Kevin Kelly (3rd season)
- Base defense: 3–4
- Home stadium: Marshall University Stadium

1998 Mid-American Conference football standings
	Conf.			Overall
Team	W		L	W		L
East Division
Marshall xy$	7	–	1	12	–	1
Miami (OH) x	7	–	1	10	–	1
Bowling Green	5	–	3	5	–	6
Ohio	5	–	3	5	–	6
Akron	3	–	6	4	–	7
Kent State	0	–	8	0	–	11
West Division
Toledo x	6	–	2	7	–	5
Western Michigan	5	–	3	7	–	4
Central Michigan	5	–	3	6	–	5
Eastern Michigan	3	–	6	3	–	8
Northern Illinois	2	–	6	2	–	9
Ball State	1	–	7	1	–	10
Championship: Marshall 23, Toledo 17
$ – Conference champion; x – Division champion/co-champions; y – Championship game participant

The 1998 Marshall Thundering Herd football team represented Marshall University in the 1998 NCAA Division I-A football season. It was Marshall's second season competing at the NCAA Division I-A level. The team won their second consecutive Mid-American Conference (MAC) championship and was invited to the Motor City Bowl.

In the 1998 season Marshall was quarterbacked by future National Football League (NFL) starter Chad Pennington and featured future NFL player Doug Chapman as the starting running back. The team finished the season with an overall record of 12–1 repeated as champions of the MAC East Division with a 7–1 conference mark.

Marshall met and defeated Toledo in the MAC Championship Game for the second year in a row. By virtue of the win they were invited to the Motor City Bowl where they played the Louisville Cardinals. Marshall won the game 48–29, marking the first bowl game victory in the history of Marshall football.

== Schedule ==
Date	Opponent	Site	TV	Result	Attendance	Source
September 5	at Akron	Rubber Bowl; Akron, OH		W 27–16	15,623	
September 12	Troy State*	Marshall University Stadium; Huntington, WV		W 42–12	25,625	
September 19	at South Carolina*	Williams–Brice Stadium; Columbia, SC		W 24–21	78,717	
September 26	at Eastern Michigan	Rynearson Stadium; Ypsilanti, MI		W 26–23	13,611	
October 3	Miami (OH)	Marshall University Stadium; Huntington, WV		W 31–17	33,204	
October 10	at Ohio	Peden Stadium; Athens, OH (Battle for the Bell)		W 30–23	21,728	
October 17	Kent State	Marshall University Stadium; Huntington, WV		W 42–7	23,481	
October 24	Ball State	Marshall University Stadium; Huntington, WV		W 42–10	21,534	
October 31	at Bowling Green	Doyt Perry Stadium; Bowling Green, OH		L 13–34	11,237	
November 7	Central Michigan^{†}	Marshall University Stadium; Huntington, WV		W 28–0	23,082	
November 21	Wofford*	Marshall University Stadium; Huntington, WV		W 29–27	18,477	
December 4	Toledo	Marshall University Stadium; Huntington, WV (MAC Championship)	ESPN2	W 23–17	28,085	
December 23	vs. Louisville*	Pontiac Silverdome; Pontiac, MI (Motor City Bowl)	ESPN	W 48–29	38,016	
*Non-conference game; ^{†}Homecoming

== Awards and honors ==
- Bob Pruett, MAC Coach of the Year
- Chad Pennington, First Team All-MAC
- Doug Chapman, First Team All-MAC
- LaVorn Colclough, First Team All-MAC
- Mike Guilliams, First Team All-MAC
- Daninelle Derricott, First Team All-MAC
- Rogers Beckett, First Team All-MAC
- Ricky Hall, First Team All-MAC
- Giradie Mercer, First Team All-MAC
