= 1998 Central Michigan Chippewas football team =

American college football season

1998 Central Michigan Chippewas football
- Conference: Mid-American Conference
- West Division
- Record: 6–5 (5–3 MAC)
- Head coach: Dick Flynn (5th season)
- Offensive coordinator: Tom Kearly (8th season)
- MVP: Eric Flowers
- Home stadium: Kelly/Shorts Stadium

1998 Mid-American Conference football standings
	Conf.			Overall
Team	W		L	W		L
East Division
Marshall xy$	7	–	1	12	–	1
Miami (OH) x	7	–	1	10	–	1
Bowling Green	5	–	3	5	–	6
Ohio	5	–	3	5	–	6
Akron	3	–	6	4	–	7
Kent State	0	–	8	0	–	11
West Division
Toledo x	6	–	2	7	–	5
Western Michigan	5	–	3	7	–	4
Central Michigan	5	–	3	6	–	5
Eastern Michigan	3	–	6	3	–	8
Northern Illinois	2	–	6	2	–	9
Ball State	1	–	7	1	–	10
Championship: Marshall 23, Toledo 17
$ – Conference champion; x – Division champion/co-champions; y – Championship game participant

The 1998 Central Michigan Chippewas football team was an American football team that represented Central Michigan University in the Mid-American Conference (MAC) during the 1998 NCAA Division I-A football season. In their fifth season under head coach Dick Flynn, the Chippewas compiled a 6–5 record (5–3 against MAC opponents), finished in third place in the MAC's West Division, and were outscored by their opponents, 253 to 229. The team played its home games in Kelly/Shorts Stadium in Mount Pleasant, Michigan, with attendance of 101,814 in five home games.

The team's statistical leaders included Pete Shepherd with 2,005 passing yards, Eric Flowers with 1,302 rushing yards, and Reggie Allen with 832 receiving yards. Flowers also had the longest run in Central Michigan history (98 yards) against Ball State on November 21, 1998. Flowers was also selected as the team's most valuable player. Defensive tackle Jonathan McCall and flanker Reggie Allen were both selected as first-team All-MAC players.

== Schedule ==
Date	Opponent	Site	Result	Attendance	Source
September 5	at Iowa*	Kinnick Stadium; Iowa City, IA	L 0–38	58,920	
September 12	Western Illinois*	Kelly/Shorts Stadium; Mount Pleasant, MI	W 35–14	26,412	
September 26	Kent State	Kelly/Shorts Stadium; Mount Pleasant, MI	W 46–7	21,984	
October 3	at Michigan State*	Spartan Stadium; East Lansing, MI	L 7–38	70,905	
October 10	at Eastern Michigan	Rynearson Stadium; Ypsilanti, MI (rivalry)	W 36–23 ^{OT}	17,423	
October 17	at Northern Illinois	Huskie Stadium; DeKalb, IL	L 6–16	15,012	
October 24	Western Michigan	Kelly/Shorts Stadium; Mount Pleasant, MI (rivalry)	W 26–24	29,841	
October 31	Akron	Kelly/Shorts Stadium; Mount Pleasant, MI	W 28–27	14,789	
November 7	at Marshall	Marshall University Stadium; Huntington, WV	L 0–28	23,082	
November 14	at Toledo	Glass Bowl; Toledo, OH	L 14–17	15,948	
November 21	Ball State	Kelly/Shorts Stadium; Mount Pleasant, MI	W 31–21	10,153	
*Non-conference game

== Roster ==
1998 Central Michigan Chippewas football team roster
Players
Coaches
Offense

Pos.	#	Name	Class
WR	6	Joe Danna	Sr
QB	16	Jeff Davis	Jr
TE	90	George Ghattas	Sr

Defense

Pos.	#	Name	Class
ILB	41	Jason Gold	Sr
ILB	44	Jeremy Gold	Sr
FS	29	Brian Leigeb	So

Special teams

Pos.	#	Name	Class

Head coach

- Dick Flynn

Coordinators/assistant coaches

Legend

- (C) Team captain
- (S) Suspended
- (I) Ineligible
- Injured
- Redshirt

Roster
