= 1998 Ball State Cardinals football team =

American college football season

1998 Ball State Cardinals football
- Conference: Mid-American Conference
- West Division
- Record: 1–10 (1–7 MAC)
- Head coach: Bill Lynch (4th season)
- Home stadium: Ball State Stadium

1998 Mid-American Conference football standings
	Conf.			Overall
Team	W		L	W		L
East Division
Marshall xy$	7	–	1	12	–	1
Miami (OH) x	7	–	1	10	–	1
Bowling Green	5	–	3	5	–	6
Ohio	5	–	3	5	–	6
Akron	3	–	6	4	–	7
Kent State	0	–	8	0	–	11
West Division
Toledo x	6	–	2	7	–	5
Western Michigan	5	–	3	7	–	4
Central Michigan	5	–	3	6	–	5
Eastern Michigan	3	–	6	3	–	8
Northern Illinois	2	–	6	2	–	9
Ball State	1	–	7	1	–	10
Championship: Marshall 23, Toledo 17
$ – Conference champion; x – Division champion/co-champions; y – Championship game participant

The 1998 Ball State Cardinals football team was an American football team that represented Ball State University in the West Division of the Mid-American Conference (MAC) during the 1998 NCAA Division I-A football season. In its fourth season under head coach Bill Lynch, the team compiled a 1–10 record (1–7 against conference opponents) and finished in sixth place out of six teams in the MAC West. The team played its home games at Ball State Stadium in Muncie, Indiana.

The team's statistical leaders included Clay Walters with 969 passing yards, LeAndre Moore with 909 rushing yards, Manuel Compas with 378 receiving yards, and Thomas Pucke with 28 points scored.

== Schedule ==
Date	Opponent	Site	Result	Attendance	Source
September 5	at South Carolina*	Williams–Brice Stadium; Columbia, SC	L 20–38	78,830	
September 12	Eastern Michigan	Ball State Stadium; Muncie, IN	L 7–13		
September 19	at Iowa State*	Jack Trice Stadium; Ames, IA	L 0–38	33,634	
September 26	at Akron	Rubber Bowl; Akron, OH	L 14–52		
October 3	Northern Illinois	Ball State Stadium; Muncie, IN (rivalry)	W 18–13	16,829	
October 10	at Toledo	Glass Bowl; Toledo, OH	L 6–27		
October 17	Miami (OH)	Ball State Stadium; Muncie, IN	L 17–28		
October 24	at Marshall	Marshall University Stadium; Huntington, WV	L 10–42	21,534	
November 7	Western Michigan	Ball State Stadium; Muncie, IN	L 23–24		
November 14	at UCF*	Florida Citrus Bowl; Orlando, FL	L 14–37	31,412	
November 21	at Central Michigan	Kelly/Shorts Stadium; Mount Pleasant, MI	L 21–31		
*Non-conference game
