= 1998 Miami RedHawks football team =

American college football season

1998 Miami RedHawks football

MAC East Division co-champion
- Conference: Mid-American Conference
- East Division
- Record: 10–1 (7–1 MAC)
- Head coach: Randy Walker (9th season)
- Offensive coordinator: Kevin Wilson (7th season)
- Offensive scheme: I formation
- Defensive coordinator: Terry Hoeppner (4th season)
- Base defense: 4–3
- Home stadium: Yager Stadium

1998 Mid-American Conference football standings
	Conf.			Overall
Team	W		L	W		L
East Division
Marshall xy$	7	–	1	12	–	1
Miami (OH) x	7	–	1	10	–	1
Bowling Green	5	–	3	5	–	6
Ohio	5	–	3	5	–	6
Akron	3	–	6	4	–	7
Kent State	0	–	8	0	–	11
West Division
Toledo x	6	–	2	7	–	5
Western Michigan	5	–	3	7	–	4
Central Michigan	5	–	3	6	–	5
Eastern Michigan	3	–	6	3	–	8
Northern Illinois	2	–	6	2	–	9
Ball State	1	–	7	1	–	10
Championship: Marshall 23, Toledo 17
$ – Conference champion; x – Division champion/co-champions; y – Championship game participant

The 1998 Miami RedHawks football team was an American football team that represented Miami University during the 1998 NCAA Division I-A football season. In their ninth season under head coach Randy Walker, the RedHawks finished in a tie for first place in the East Division of the Mid-American Conference (MAC), compiled a 10–1 record (7–1 against MAC opponents), and outscored all opponents by a combined total of 317 to 142. The team's sole loss came against MAC champion Marshall by a 31–17 score.

The team's statistical leaders included Mike Bath with 1,500 passing yards, Travis Prentice with 1,787 rushing yards, and Trevor Gaylor with 653 receiving yards.

== Schedule ==
Date	Time	Opponent	Site	Result	Attendance	Source
September 5	6:00 p.m.	at No. 12 North Carolina*	Kenan Memorial Stadium; Chapel Hill, NC	W 13–10	60,100	
September 12		at Army*	Michie Stadium; West Point, NY	W 14–13		
September 26		Toledo	Yager Stadium; Oxford, OH	W 28–14		
October 3		at Marshall	Marshall University Stadium; Huntington, WV	L 17–31	33,204	
October 10		Bowling Green	Yager Stadium; Oxford, OH	W 24–12		
October 17		at Ball State	Ball State Stadium; Muncie, IN	W 28–17		
October 24		at Cincinnati*	Nippert Stadium; Cincinnati, OH (rivalry)	W 41–0		
October 31		Ohio	Yager Stadium; Oxford, OH (rivalry)	W 35–21		
November 7	12:30 p.m.	at Northern Illinois	Huskie Stadium; DeKalb, IL	W 41–10	15,867	
November 14		Kent State	Yager Stadium; Oxford, OH	W 56–0		
November 21		at Akron	Rubber Bowl; Akron, OH	W 20–14		
*Non-conference game; Rankings from AP Poll released prior to the game; All times are in Eastern time
