= 1998 Kent State Golden Flashes football team =

American college football season

1998 Kent State Golden Flashes football
- Conference: Mid-American Conference
- East Division
- Record: 0–11 (0–8 MAC)
- Head coach: Dean Pees (1st season)
- Offensive coordinator: Charley Molnar (5th season)
- Defensive coordinator: Greg Colby (1st season)
- Home stadium: Dix Stadium

1998 Mid-American Conference football standings
	Conf.			Overall
Team	W		L	W		L
East Division
Marshall xy$	7	–	1	12	–	1
Miami (OH) x	7	–	1	10	–	1
Bowling Green	5	–	3	5	–	6
Ohio	5	–	3	5	–	6
Akron	3	–	6	4	–	7
Kent State	0	–	8	0	–	11
West Division
Toledo x	6	–	2	7	–	5
Western Michigan	5	–	3	7	–	4
Central Michigan	5	–	3	6	–	5
Eastern Michigan	3	–	6	3	–	8
Northern Illinois	2	–	6	2	–	9
Ball State	1	–	7	1	–	10
Championship: Marshall 23, Toledo 17
$ – Conference champion; x – Division champion/co-champions; y – Championship game participant

The 1998 Kent State Golden Flashes football team was an American football team that represented Kent State University in the Mid-American Conference (MAC) during the 1998 NCAA Division I-A football season. In their first season under head coach Dean Pees, the Golden Flashes compiled a 0–11 record (0–8 against MAC opponents), finished in last place in the MAC East, and were outscored by all opponents by a combined total of 454 to 149.

The team's statistical leaders included Demarlo Rozier with 621 rushing yards, Jose Davis with 2,046 passing yards, and Eugene Baker with 685 receiving yards.

This was the last winless season for Kent State until 2024.

== Schedule ==
Date	Opponent	Site	Result	Attendance	Source
September 5	at No. 19 Georgia*	Sanford Stadium; Athens, GA	L 3–56	86,003	
September 12	Youngstown State (I-AA)*	Dix Stadium; Kent, OH	L 10–24	17,782	
September 19	at Navy*	Navy–Marine Corps Memorial Stadium; Annapolis, MD	L 24–38		
September 26	at Central Michigan	Kelly/Shorts Stadium; Mount Pleasant, MI	L 7–46	21,984	
October 3	Eastern Michigan	Dix Stadium; Kent, OH	L 17–26		
October 10	Akron	Dix Stadium; Kent, OH (Wagon Wheel)	L 16–45		
October 17	at Marshall	Marshall University Stadium; Huntington, WV	L 7–42	23,481	
October 24	at Bowling Green	Doyt Perry Stadium; Bowling Green, OH (Anniversary Award)	L 21–42		
October 31	Western Michigan	Dix Stadium; Kent, OH	L 23–48		
November 14	at Miami (OH)	Yager Stadium; Oxford, OH	L 0–56		
November 21	Ohio	Dix Stadium; Kent, OH	L 21–31		
*Non-conference game; Rankings from AP Poll released prior to the game
