= 2000 Motor City Bowl =

Cincinnati Bearcats	Marshall Thundering Herd
(7–4)	(7–5)
C-USA	MAC
14	25
Head coach: Rick Minter	Head coach: Bob Pruett
	1	2	3	4	Total
Cincinnati	7	7	0	0	14
Marshall	9	0	13	3	25
- Date: December 27, 2000
- Season: 2000
- Stadium: Pontiac Silverdome
- Location: Pontiac, Michigan
- MVP: Byron Leftwich QB Marshall
- Referee: Joe Rider (ACC)
- Attendance: 52,911

United States TV coverage
- Network: ESPN
- Announcers: Pam Ward, Don McPherson, and Holly Rowe

The 2000 Motor City Bowl was a National Collegiate Athletic Association bowl game in which the Marshall Thundering Herd of the MAC defeated the Cincinnati Bearcats of the Conference USA 25–14. It was played on December 27, 2000, at the Pontiac Silverdome in Pontiac, Michigan. The Bearcats were C-USA runners-up fresh off the wins from five of their last six games, which included Syracuse and #20 Southern Mississippi. Marshall however was the four-time MAC champion who had also won five of their last six games, one of which was against Western Michigan, who had defeated them earlier in the season, in the MAC Championship Game.

Cincinnati kicker Jonathan Ruffin was an All-America and had won the Lou Groza Award as the nation's best placekicker. Quarterback Deontey Kenner led the Bearcat offense, while 330 lb defensive tackle Mario Monds led the defense.

Marshall's offense was led by future NFL quarterback Byron Leftwich, its defense was led by four-year starter Paul Toviessi. This year marked the 30th anniversary of the tragic 1970 plane crash which took the lives of 75 Marshall football players, coaches, administrators, and boosters on November 14.

Marshall quarterback Byron Leftwich was named the game's MVP.

The game was the 4th installment of the Motor City Bowl, matching the Conference USA against the Mid-American Conference for the first time in its history.

== Scoring summary ==
Scoring play	Score
1st Quarter
MU– Watts 77-yard TD pass from Leftwich (Jenkins kick), 12:48	MU 7–0
UC– McCleskey 2-yard TD run (Ruffin kick), 8:28	Tie 7–7
MU– Safety Owens, 2:35	MU 9–7
2nd Quarter
UC– McCleskey 2-yard TD run (Ruffin kick), 1:44	UC 14–9
3rd Quarter
MU– Leftwich 1-yard TD run (Leftwich pass failed), 12:01	MU 15–14
MU– Wallace 4-yard TD run (Jenkins kick), 7:24	MU 22–14
4th Quarter
MU – Jenkins 25-yard FG, 00:43	MU 25–14
