= Marco the Bison =

Mascot of Marshall University in West Virginia, USA

Marco (Marshall University Mascot)
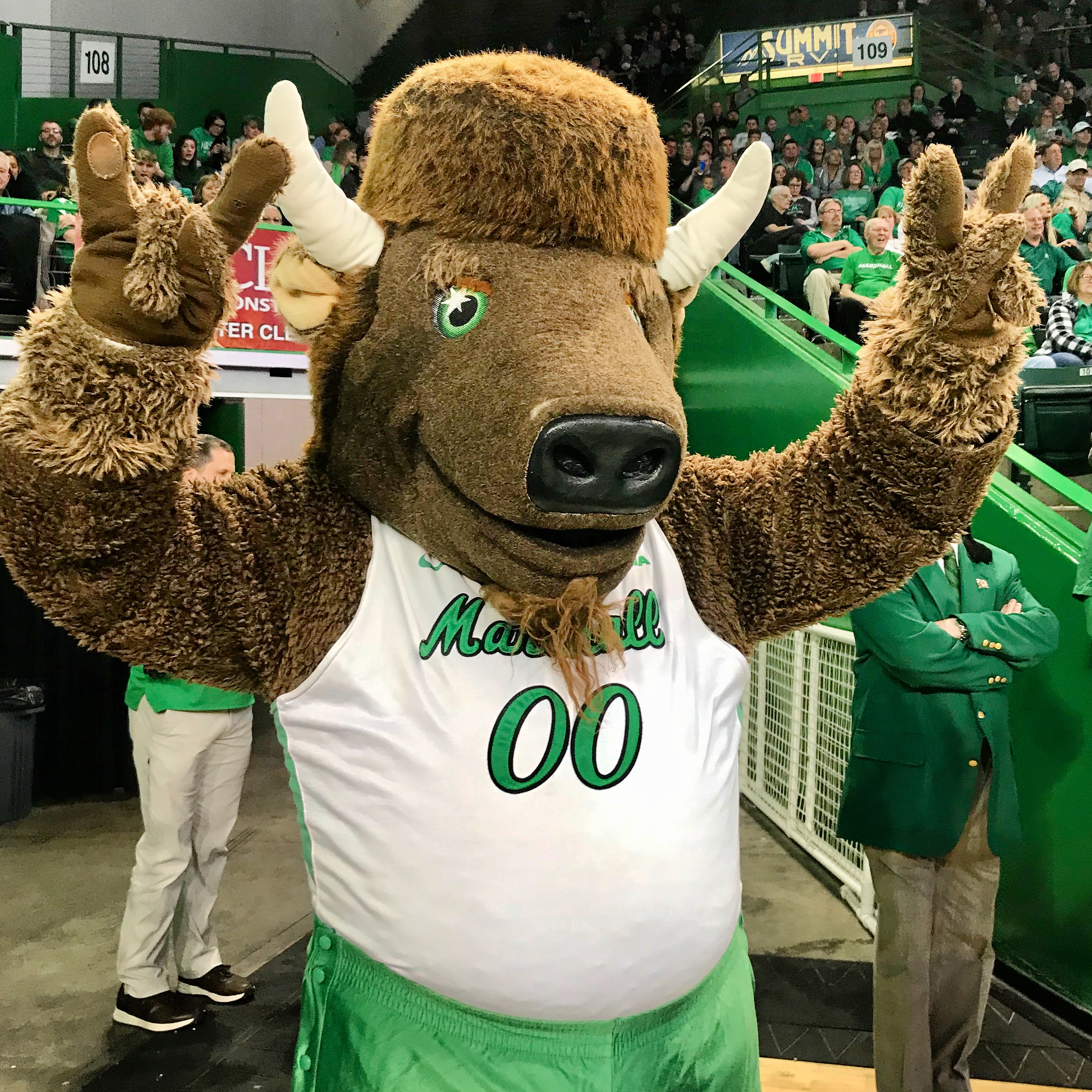
- Official Athletics Mascot of Marshall University
- University: Marshall University
- Conference: Sun Belt
- Description: anthropomorphic bison
- Origin of name: Marshall College (now Marshall University)
- First seen: 1965 (Latest Version Fall 2013)

Marco the Bison is the official costumed mascot of Marshall University in Huntington, West Virginia. He is an American Bison dressed in the home uniform of the school. Marco's name developed from a mix of the university's name at the time, Marshall College. Marshall became a university in 1961, but the name for Marco stuck.

== Origin ==
Marshall's early sports teams were called Indians or "Normalists," as Marshall was a normal school, a two-year degree that qualified the degree holder to teach secondary school. When the team changed colors from black and blue to green and white in 1903 the team went by "Big Green" for a number of years.

Marshall's student body first got a bison in the 1930s, when an animal from the famous Marland 101 Ranch in Oklahoma was procured. The animal went along with the nickname then The Herald-Dispatch's sports editor started using for the team in 1928.

Duke Ridgley was a fan of Zane Grey's novel, "The Thundering Herd," and the silent movie that came out not long after the book was released in 1925. Bison had indeed roamed the Ohio Valley near Huntington, WV at one time.

While the student newspaper suggested "Judges" to honor the college's namesake, Chief Justice John Marshall, and the evening newspaper, The Huntington Advertiser, wanted "Boogiecats" or "Boogercats" to replace the name, "Big Green." It was a cat found in Scotland called a Boogie Cat, or mountain lion in the U.S.

Ridgley won out in the end and "Thundering Herd" became one of the most distinctive nicknames in sports, but there would be other challengers through the years.

The Big Green vs. Marco controversy was on-going, however. In 1958, the student body voted on three possibilities: Thundering Herd, Big Green and Green Gobblers. Big Green won, but many still referred to the team as the Herd. In 1964, Dr. Stewart Smith, President of Marshall University, gave student, faculty, alumni and others a chance to vote on three again: Thundering Herd, Big Green and the Rams, with Sam the Ram suggested by a former President of the MU Alumni Association, Leonard Samworth.

On January 5, 1965, over 85 percent of the voters went with Thundering Herd. Big Green was given to the scholarship foundation for athletics and is still used for that purpose. Sam the Ram went away forever, along with Green Gobblers, Boogercats, Indians and Judges.

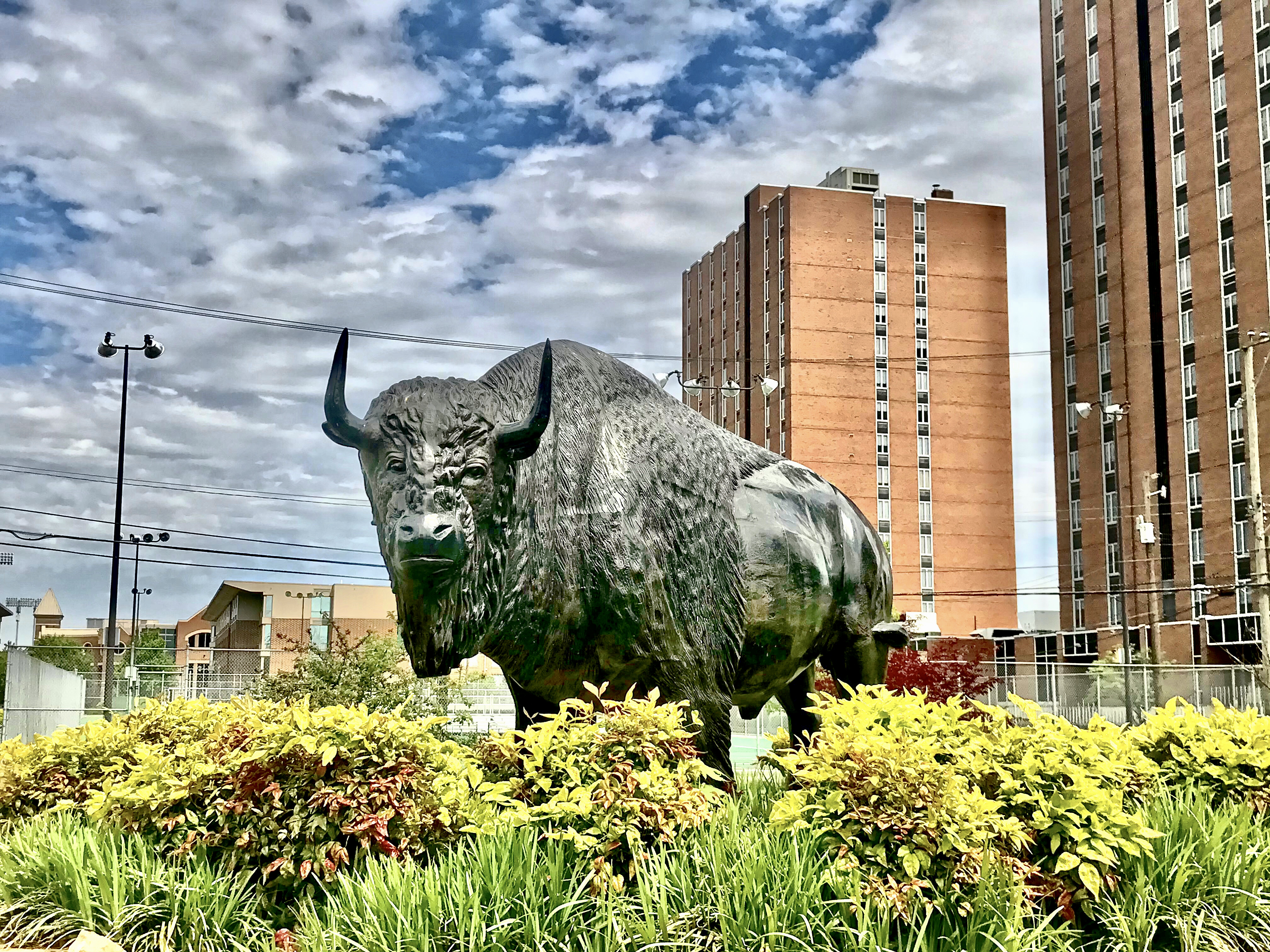
Marco statue on Hodges Field

Marshall's mascot Marco had many different looks since he was first put into costume in 1954. He started off as a four-legged, rugged looking bison of paper mache' in the 1930s in a homecoming parade skit, then progressed to Marco in a full football uniform, in furry full costume, adding a vest in the 1980s.

Marco has not always been the only mascot used at Marshall. During football seasons in the late 1960s and early 1970s, Marshall used two mascots: Marco, and another real bison, purchased by one of the doctors who died on the Marshall Football plane crash of November 14, 1970, killing all 75 persons aboard including most of the football team and coaches. The two made regular appearances at football game: in fact, the real Marco got loose on the Astroturf in 1971 and delayed a second-half kickoff until he was returned to his cage. The real bison was retired to nearby Camden Park, a nearby amusement park which had a petting zoo in the 1970s and where he stayed when not at Fairfield Stadium for games. Marshall also had "Marsha," a female mascot in the wake of the women's liberation movement of the 1970s who was created in 1973 but only through the end of the 1970s.

There was even a "Buffy," a green-furred bison with the distinctive Marshall "beanie" who was added for a single year by the women's basketball program in 1979-80, along with a walking basketball with big eyes called "Bouncy." They both disappeared soon after the end of that season.

Marco was nationally recognized when he won the National Mascot Championship award in 1992, beating "Big Red" from Western Kentucky among others.

== Criticism ==
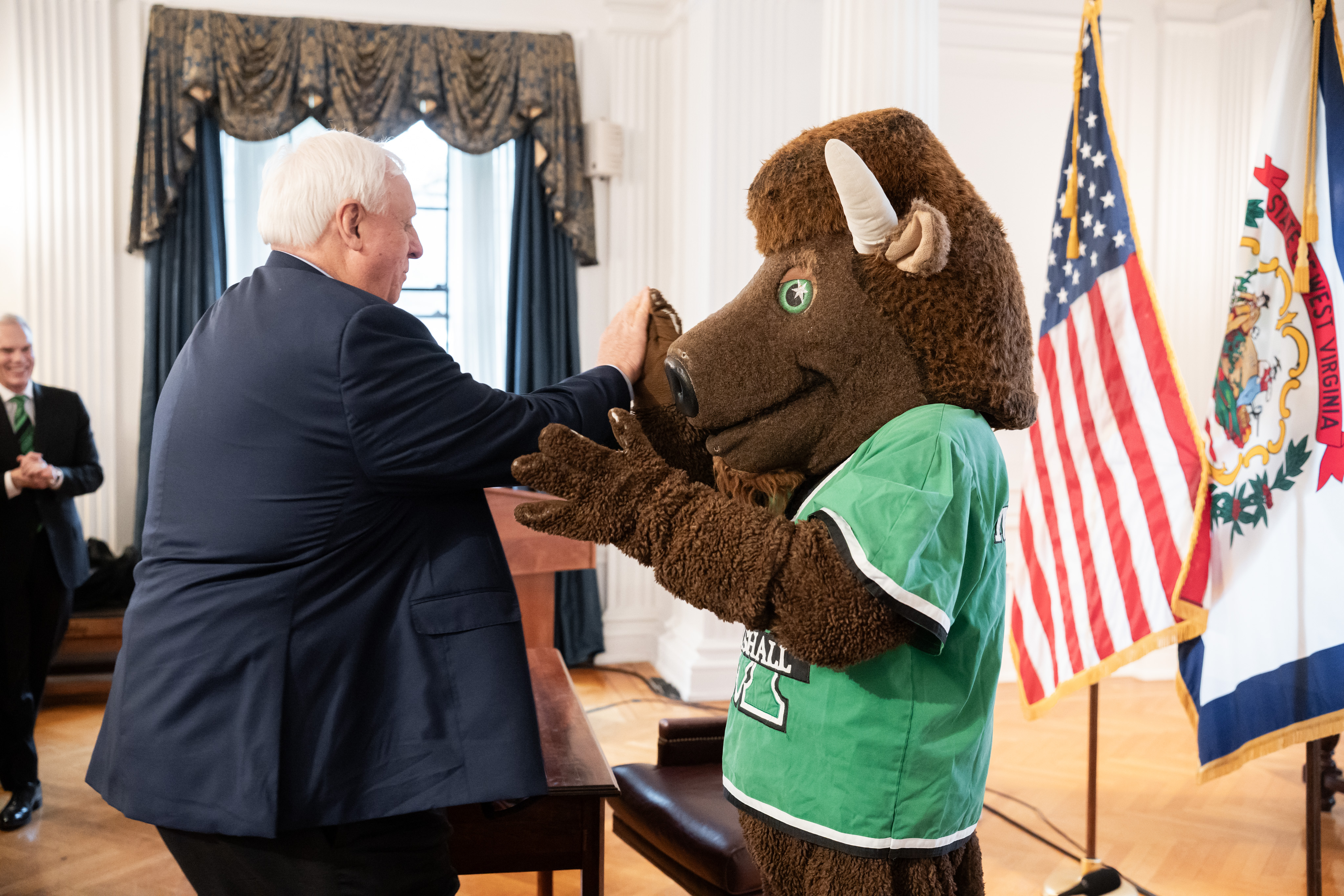
Marco with West Virginia governor Jim Justice

The university's beloved mascot underwent a makeover in 2008, thanks to a fundraising effort in the fall headed by the Marshall University Alumni Association in conjunction with the MU Athletic Department. His new costume was crafted by Dale Morton Studios in Hurricane, West Virginia. He was revealed prior to the Marshall homecoming game on November 15, 2008 against the UCF Knights.

When the smoke cleared from the tunnel, fans saw a mascot with smaller feet, track pants, muscles and a face bearing an enormous nose, long nails on the fingers (supposed to look like hooves on the rare time the mascot held his fingers together and down towards the ground) and glaring eyes. Since then, feedback on the Internet has been overwhelmingly negative.

Of the 389 people who had responded to The Herald-Dispatch's unscientific online poll question of whether they liked the new look, 81 percent said no. And more than 2,300 people had joined a Facebook group called "Bring Back Classic Marco!"

In 2013 yet another makeover was performed and Marco received a new suit similar to the one used prior to 2008.

== Lore ==
Marco graduated with a master's degree in Sports Administration with two minors in psychology. Between under grad and grad school, Marco took a gap year to go fishing up in the Great Lakes area.

Here he met the love of his life, Marsha. The two met while on a guided fishing tour on Lake Superior. Later she would join Marco at Marshall University and would be beside him as they cheered on their athletes. Though some years later, Marsha would retire from the cheering life and left Marco to pump up the crowds alone while she moved on to work in digital designs (her true passion).

== Other institutions with a bison/buffalo mascot ==
- Bethany College
- Bucknell University
- University of Colorado, called "Ralphie" who runs on the field before the team
- Gallaudet University
- Howard University, the Buffalo Soldiers in the 1990s, after a famous African-American fighting unit
- Lipscomb University
- Harding University
- Nichols College
- North Dakota State University
- Oklahoma Baptist University
- Southwestern Law School
- University of Manitoba in Canada
- West Texas A&M University

== See also ==
- List of U.S. college mascots
