= The Parthenon (newspaper) =

Student newspaper of Marshall University

- Type: Student newspaper
- Format: Tabloid
- School: Marshall University
- Editor: Baylee Parsons
- Founded: 1898
- Headquarters: 109 Communications Building; 1 John Marshall Drive; Huntington, West Virginia; United States
- Circulation: 6,000
- Website: marshallparthenon.com

The Parthenon is the independent student newspaper of Marshall University based in Huntington, West Virginia. The paper began publication in 1898. It currently is published in print on Wednesdays with content added daily online. It is distributed for "free" (it is funded by a fee added to tuition and by ad revenue) on the Huntington and South Charleston campuses. The Parthenon is also published online. Student reporters change every semester and are instructed by the faculty adviser in a beat reporting class within the school of journalism. Editors, staff reporters and other staff change annually or every semester. The Parthenon is advised by a professor in the journalism and mass communications department at the university, however all editorial decisions are made solely by the editorial staff. The newspaper generally covers campus news and news from the local area, sometimes mentioning state or national events.

== History ==
The first edition of a newspaper called The Parthenon appeared in November 1898, making it one of the oldest university newspapers in the country. A news magazine by another name predated it. The Parthenon is published online daily and in print each Wednesday of the semester. During the summer, it publishes biweekly. It is produced by student editors who are responsible for the news and editorial content.The Parthenon consistently wins awards from the West Virginia Press Association and the Society of Professional Journalists.

The editor and managing editor are chosen by a media committee and they then choose their member staff to serve as editors and staff reporters. During the regular academic year, many of the stories printed in the paper are written by students taking reporting classes thus earning students the clippings to build a professional portfolio for internships and job interviews. Non-journalism students participate by writing columns, reviews and letters to the editor, or by serving as a staff editor if they have the necessary experience.

During the second world war, The Parthenon editorial staff was almost entirely women, gaining the nickname "The Petticoat Parthenon."

== Sections ==
The Parthenon currently has sections in news, sports - covering all Marshall University athletics, life, and opinion. The Parthenon also previously produced video and podcast content.

== Controversies ==
In 1992, The Parthenon published the name of a rape victim in a 4–3 vote among the student editorial board to publish the name. The decision received considerable backlash and coverage both nationally and on Marshall's campus and the surrounding community.

== Popular culture ==
- The Parthenon was featured in many transitions within the ESPN documentary, Rand University, a feature-length 30 for 30 film that explores Randy Moss's origins
