= Bob Pruett =

American football player and coach (born 1943)

Biographical details
- Born: June 20, 1943 (age 83); Beckley, West Virginia, U.S.

Playing career
- 1962–1964: Marshall
- Positions: Halfback, tight end

Coaching career (HC unless noted)
- 1965–1967: Falls Church HS (VA) (assistant)
- 1968–1969: Hayfield SS (VA) (assistant)
- 1970–1972: Groveton HS (VA)
- 1973–1978: Gar-Field HS (VA)
- 1979–1980: Marshall (DL)
- 1981–1982: Marshall (DC/DB)
- 1983–1984: Wake Forest (DB)
- 1985–1989: Wake Forest (DC)
- 1990–1991: Ole Miss (DB)
- 1992–1993: Tulane (DC)
- 1994–1995: Florida (DC)
- 1996–2004: Marshall
- 2008: Virginia (DC)

Head coaching record
- Overall: 94–23 (college)
- Bowls: 5–2
- Tournaments: 4–0 (NCAA D-I-AA playoffs)

Accomplishments and honors

Championships
- 1 Division I-AA National (1996); 1 SoCon (1996); 5 MAC (1997–2000, 2002); 6 MAC East Division (1997–2002)

Awards
- 2× MAC Coach of the Year (1997–1998)

Robert Lewis Pruett (born June 20, 1943) is a former American college football coach. He served as the head football coach Marshall University for nine seasons, from 1996 to 2004. During his tenure at Marshall, the Marshall Thundering Herd football team compiled a record of 94–23 (.803 winning percentage), completed two undefeated seasons, won six conference championships, won five of seven bowl games played, and captured the NCAA Division I-AA Football Championship in 1996. Pruett has coached many high-profile National Football League (NFL) players, including Randy Moss, Chad Pennington, and Byron Leftwich. In 1999, he was inducted into the Marshall University Athletics Hall of Fame for his collegiate career in football, track and field, and wrestling.

== Early life and playing career ==
Pruett is a native of Beckley, West Virginia and was a star football player, wrestler, and sprinter at Woodrow Wilson High School. He attended Marshall University in Huntington, West Virginia where he originally played halfback on the football team, but moved to tight end his last two years, catching 24 passes for 442 yards and four touchdowns. After graduation in 1965 he signed as a free agent with the Dallas Cowboys of the National Football League, and later played for four seasons with the Virginia Sailors / Roanoke Buckskins, a semi-pro team in Virginia.

== High school coaching career ==
Pruetts' coaching career began with the school system of Fairfax County, Virginia in the Washington, D.C. suburbs. He was an assistant football coach, head wrestling coach and head golf coach at Falls Church High School (1965–1967) and Hayfield Secondary School (1968–1969). His first head coaching job was at Groveton High School from 1970 to 1972. He was portrayed in the movie Remember the Titans when the 1971 Groveton vs TC Williams game was featured. Pruett then moved to Gar-Field Senior High School in Woodbridge, Virginia, serving as head football coach from 1973 to 1978.

== Collegiate coaching career ==
Pruett earned his first collegiate coaching job in 1979 as the defensive line coach for his alma mater, Marshall University. In 1981, he became the defensive backs coach and defensive coordinator for the Herd until the end of the 1982 season. Before the start of the 1983 season, Pruett joined the coaching staff of the Wake Forest Demon Deacons as the defensive backs coach. His lifelong friend, Al Groh, was the head coach of the Demon Deacons at the time. He remained the defensive backs coach until 1985, when he took on the role of defensive coordinator. Though Groh stepped down as head coach of the Deacons in 1986, Pruett kept the job of DC until 1990, when he became the defensive backs coach at Ole Miss the next season. Pruett, known for his diverse defensive coverages, gained high respect in the NCAA, and as a result, would coach as a defensive coordinator or head coach for the rest of his coaching career. The following year, the Tulane Green Wave hired him as their defensive coordinator until the end of the 1993 season, when one of his lifelong goals came true.

Pruett, who had aspired to coach at the University of Florida for quite some time, applied and was employed by Steve Spurrier's staff for the 1994 and 1995 seasons as defensive coordinator. In his first season there, his defense held opposing teams to an average of 84.6 rushing yards per game, and kept those same teams to an average of 17.1 points per game. That season, the Gators played the University of Alabama Crimson Tide in the SEC Championship, in which they won, 24–23. They then accepted a bid to play in the Sugar Bowl against their in-state rivals, the Florida State Seminoles, in which they lost, 23-17.

In his second and final season at Florida, Pruett's defensive squad led the team to an undefeated regular season. Also, the UF defense that year was ranked top 25 in the nation in scoring defense, pass efficiency defense, rushing defense, and total defense. In the SEC Championship that year, the Gators took on the Arkansas Razorbacks and came out with an easy win, with the score 34–3. At #2 in the AP Polls, The Gators were given a bid to play in the Fiesta Bowl in Tempe, Arizona against the also undefeated Nebraska Cornhuskers. The game was a rout, with the Cornhuskers coming away with the victory, 62–24. This game came to be known as the "Fiasco Bowl" due to the lopsided score.

While coaching at Florida, the head coaching job at Marshall University became vacant due to Jim Donnan taking the head coaching job at the University of Georgia. Pruett immediately applied for the position, later Marshall President J. Wade Gilley called Pruett and informed him that the job was his. In 2003, Pruett served as the head coach of the Blue squad in what turned out to be the final Blue-Gray Football Classic. Pruett and his Blue team defeated the Gray 31-24.

In 2008, Pruett came out of retirement to become the defensive coordinator for Virginia. After the 2008 season, Pruett retired again.

== Head coaching record ==
=== College ===
Year	Team	Overall	Conference	Standing	Bowl/playoffs	Coaches^{#}	AP^{°}
Marshall Thundering Herd (Southern Conference) (1996)
1996	Marshall	15–0	8–0	1st	W NCAA Division I-AA Championship		
Marshall Thundering Herd (Mid-American Conference) (1997–2004)
1997	Marshall	10–3	7–1	1st (East)	L Motor City		
1998	Marshall	12–1	7–1	T–1st (East)	W Motor City		
1999	Marshall	13–0	8–0	1st (East)	W Motor City	10	10
2000	Marshall	8–5	5–3	T–1st (East)	W Motor City		
2001	Marshall	11–2	8–0	1st (East)	W GMAC	21	
2002	Marshall	11–2	7–1	1st (East)	W GMAC	19	24
2003	Marshall	8–4	6–2	2nd (East)			
2004	Marshall	6–6	6–2	T–2nd (East)	L Fort Worth		
Marshall:		94–23	62–10				
Total:		94–23					
National championship Conference title Conference division title or championship game berth
^{#}Rankings from final Coaches Poll.; ^{°}Rankings from final AP Poll.
