= 1998 Toledo Rockets football team =

American college football season

1998 Toledo Rockets football

MAC West Division champion

MAC Championship Game, L 17–23 vs. Marshall
- Conference: Mid-American Conference
- West Division
- Record: 7–5 (6–2 MAC)
- Head coach: Gary Pinkel (8th season)
- Offensive coordinator: Dave Christensen (2nd season)
- Offensive scheme: Multiple
- Defensive coordinator: Tom Amstutz (5th season)
- Base defense: 4–4
- Home stadium: Glass Bowl

1998 Mid-American Conference football standings
	Conf.			Overall
Team	W		L	W		L
East Division
Marshall xy$	7	–	1	12	–	1
Miami (OH) x	7	–	1	10	–	1
Bowling Green	5	–	3	5	–	6
Ohio	5	–	3	5	–	6
Akron	3	–	6	4	–	7
Kent State	0	–	8	0	–	11
West Division
Toledo x	6	–	2	7	–	5
Western Michigan	5	–	3	7	–	4
Central Michigan	5	–	3	6	–	5
Eastern Michigan	3	–	6	3	–	8
Northern Illinois	2	–	6	2	–	9
Ball State	1	–	7	1	–	10
Championship: Marshall 23, Toledo 17
$ – Conference champion; x – Division champion/co-champions; y – Championship game participant

The 1998 Toledo Rockets football team was an American football team that represented the University of Toledo in the Mid-American Conference (MAC) during the 1998 NCAA Division I-A football season. In their eighth season under head coach Gary Pinkel, the Rockets compiled a 7–5 record (6–2 against MAC opponents), finished in first place in the MAC's West Division, lost to Marshall in the MAC Football Championship Game (17–23), and outscored all opponents by a combined total of 229 to 216.

The team's statistical leaders included Chris Wallace with 2,476 passing yards, Wasean Tait with 625 rushing yards, and Ray Curry with 513 receiving yards.

== Schedule ==
Date	Opponent	Site	Result	Attendance	Source
September 5	Temple*	Glass Bowl; Toledo, OH	W 24–12		
September 12	at No. 1 Ohio State*	Ohio Stadium; Columbus, OH	L 0–49	93,149	
September 19	Western Michigan	Glass Bowl; Toledo, OH	W 35–7		
September 26	at Miami (OH)	Yager Stadium; Oxford, OH	L 14–28		
October 3	UCF*	Glass Bowl; Toledo, OH	L 24–31	20,008	
October 10	Ball State	Glass Bowl; Toledo, OH	W 27–6		
October 17	Bowling Green	Glass Bowl; Toledo, OH (Battle of I-75 Trophy)	W 24–16		
October 24	at Akron	Rubber Bowl; Akron, OH	W 24–17		
October 31	at Northern Illinois	Huskie Stadium; DeKalb, IL	W 16–3	14,931	
November 14	Central Michigan	Glass Bowl; Toledo, OH	W 17–14	15,948	
November 21	at Eastern Michigan	Ypsilanti, MI	L 7–10		
December 4	at Marshall	Huntington, WV (MAC Championship Game)	L 17–23	28,085	
*Non-conference game; Rankings from AP Poll released prior to the game
