= 1998 Motor City Bowl =

Louisville Cardinals	Marshall Thundering Herd
(7–4)	(11–1)
C-USA	MAC
29	48
Head coach: John L. Smith	Head coach: Bob Pruett
	1	2	3	4	Total
Louisville	0	21	0	8	29
Marshall	7	14	17	10	48
- Date: December 23, 1998
- Season: 1998
- Stadium: Pontiac Silverdome
- Location: Pontiac, Michigan
- MVP: QB Chad Pennington (Marshall)
- Attendance: 38,016

United States TV coverage
- Network: ESPN
- Announcers: Mike Tirico (play-by-play); Todd Blackledge (analyst)

The 1998 Motor City Bowl was a National Collegiate Athletic Association bowl game in which the Marshall Thundering Herd of the MAC defeated the Louisville Cardinals of Conference USA 48–29. It was played on December 23, 1998, at the Pontiac Silverdome in Pontiac, Michigan.

== Background ==
Marshall was the only Division I-A or I-AA school to record 100 victories in the 1990s, and they had been in both Divisions for the decade. After twenty years of dominating Division I-AA and winning two championships, they moved to I-A starting with the 1997 season, joining the Mid-American Conference. In their first season, they won the MAC title and played in the 1997 Motor City Bowl, which they lost. Marshall, led by Chad Pennington at quarterback, was looking for their first ever bowl victory, having lost their first two.

This was Louisville's first bowl game since the 1993 Liberty Bowl. John L. Smith took over a program that had gone 1-10 the previous year, leading Louisville to 3rd place in Conference USA.

== Game summary ==
The game went 12 minutes and 56 seconds before the first score, but when James Williams caught a touchdown pass from Chad Pennington, the scoring began. Marshall and Louisville were tied 21–21 at half time after six consecutive touchdowns combined from both teams to end the half with the average drive covering 84 yards. But Marshall scored 24 straight points in the second half before Louisville responded with a Collins touchdown. But it was too little too late as Billy Malashevich (who had kicked 6 extra points and a field goal previously in this game) kicked a field goal with ten minutes remaining that sealed the game for the Herd as they celebrated their first bowl win in Herd history. Chad Pennington threw for 411 yards and for 4 touchdowns on 18 of 24 passes. Chris Redman went 35 for 54 for 336 yards and Leroy Collins had 94 yards on 14 carries for three touchdowns. Marshall only punted once, on its first possession of the game.

== Aftermath ==
Marshall would go to a bowl game for four consecutive years, including two more Motor City Bowls. In 2009, they returned to play in what was now renamed the Little Caesars Pizza Bowl.

This began Louisville's streak of nine consecutive bowl-eligible seasons, which ended after Louisville's Orange Bowl win in 2007. The two teams would meet again in the 2002 GMAC Bowl.

== Statistics ==
Statistics	Louisville	Marshall
First downs	26	27
Yards rushing	66	202
Yards passing	336	411
Total Offensive Yards	402	613
Punts-Average	4-49.3	1-58.0
Fumbles-Lost	3-0	2-0
Interceptions	1	0
Penalties-Yards	13-109	14-123
