= Marshall Thundering Herd football statistical leaders =

The Marshall Thundering Herd football statistical leaders are individual statistical leaders of the Marshall Thundering Herd football program in various categories, including passing, rushing, receiving, total offense, defensive stats, and kicking. Within those areas, the lists identify single-game, single-season, and career leaders. The Thundering Herd represent Marshall University in the NCAA Division I FBS Sun Belt Conference.

Although Marshall began competing in intercollegiate football in 1895, the school's official record book considers the "modern era" to have begun in 1950. Records from before this year are often incomplete and inconsistent, and they are generally not included in these lists.

These lists are dominated by more recent players for several reasons:

- Since 1950, seasons have increased from 10 games to 11 and then 12 games in length.
- With the exception of the World War II years, freshmen were not allowed to play until the 1971 season in the aftermath of the crash of Southern Airways Flight 932. The NCAA allowed freshmen at all schools to start playing in 1972.
- Bowl games only began counting toward single-season and career statistics in 2002. The Thundering Herd have played in seven bowl games since this decision, giving many recent players an extra game to accumulate statistics.
- Although bowl games were not counted toward single-season and career statistics until 2002, games in NCAA championship tournaments have always been included. This is relevant because Marshall had a very successful tenure in Division I-AA, now known as the Football Championship Subdivision. When Marshall first played at the I-AA level in 1982, the tournament involved 12 teams; it expanded to 16 teams in 1986, remaining at that size through Marshall's final I-AA season in 1996. The Herd were regularly involved in the division's championship tournament, advancing to the championship game seven times and winning it twice. Several single-season records date from this era.

These lists are updated through the end of the 2025 season.

== Passing ==
=== Passing yards ===
Career
| Rk | Player | Yards | Years |
|---|---|---|---|
| 1 | Rakeem Cato | 14,079 | 2011 2012 2013 2014 |
| 2 | Chad Pennington | 13,143 | 1995 1997 1998 1999 |
| 3 | Byron Leftwich | 11,903 | 1998 1999 2000 2001 2002 |
| 4 | Michael Payton | 9,411 | 1989 1990 1991 1992 |
| 5 | Chase Litton | 8,335 | 2015 2016 2017 |
| 6 | Todd Donnan | 7,050 | 1991 1992 1993 1994 |
| 7 | John Gregory | 7,020 | 1986 1987 1988 1989 |
| 8 | Carl Fodor | 6,655 | 1982 1983 1984 1985 |
| 9 | Tony Petersen | 6,501 | 1986 1987 |
| 10 | Grant Wells | 5,623 | 2019 2020 2021 |

Single season
| Rk | Player | Yards | Year |
|---|---|---|---|
| 1 | Tony Petersen | 4,902 | 1987 |
| 2 | Byron Leftwich | 4,268 | 2002 |
| 3 | Rakeem Cato | 4,201 | 2012 |
| 4 | Byron Leftwich | 4,132 | 2001 |
| 5 | Rakeem Cato | 3,916 | 2013 |
| 6 | Rakeem Cato | 3,903 | 2014 |
| 7 | Chad Pennington | 3,799 | 1999 |
| 8 | Michael Payton | 3,610 | 1992 |
| 9 | Grant Wells | 3,532 | 2021 |
| 10 | Chad Pennington | 3,480 | 1997 |

Single game
| Rk | Player | Yards | Year | Opponent |
|---|---|---|---|---|
| 1 | Byron Leftwich | 576 | 2001 | East Carolina |
| 2 | Michael Payton | 496 | 1991 | VMI |
| 3 | Chase Litton | 486 | 2015 | Charlotte |
| 4 | Tony Petersen | 481 | 1987 | Western Carolina |
| 5 | Tony Petersen | 474 | 1987 | Northeast Louisiana |
| 6 | Byron Leftwich | 471 | 2001 | Central Michigan |
| 7 | Byron Leftwich | 469 | 2002 | Appalachian State |
| 8 | Rakeem Cato | 456 | 2013 | Tulsa |
| 9 | Byron Leftwich | 455 | 2001 | Buffalo |
| 10 | Eric Kresser | 449 | 1996 | Delaware |

=== Passing touchdowns ===
Career
| Rk | Player | TDs | Years |
|---|---|---|---|
| 1 | Rakeem Cato | 131 | 2011 2012 2013 2014 |
| 2 | Chad Pennington | 115 | 1995 1997 1998 1999 |
| 3 | Byron Leftwich | 89 | 1998 1999 2000 2001 2002 |
| 4 | Chase Litton | 72 | 2015 2016 2017 |
| 5 | Michael Payton | 69 | 1989 1990 1991 1992 |
| 6 | Todd Donnan | 61 | 1991 1992 1993 1994 |
| 7 | John Gregory | 51 | 1986 1987 1988 1989 |
| 8 | Tony Petersen | 43 | 1986 1987 |
| 9 | Carl Fodor | 39 | 1982 1983 1984 1985 |
| 10 | Stan Hill | 38 | 2001 2002 2003 2004 |

Single season
| Rk | Player | TDs | Year |
|---|---|---|---|
| 1 | Rakeem Cato | 40 | 2014 |
| 2 | Chad Pennington | 39 | 1997 |
| | Rakeem Cato | 39 | 2013 |
| 4 | Byron Leftwich | 38 | 2001 |
| 5 | Chad Pennington | 37 | 1999 |
| | Rakeem Cato | 37 | 2012 |
| 7 | Tony Petersen | 35 | 1987 |
| | Eric Kresser | 35 | 1996 |
| 9 | Todd Donnan | 33 | 1994 |
| 10 | Michael Payton | 31 | 1992 |

Single game
| Rk | Player | TDs | Year | Opponent |
|---|---|---|---|---|
| 1 | Rakeem Cato | 7 | 2014 | Western Kentucky |
| 2 | Byron Leftwich | 6 | 2001 | Ohio |
| | Chase Litton | 6 | 2016 | Morgan State |

== Rushing ==
Complete yardage totals for Jackie Hunt and John Zontini are not available because such specific statistics were not always kept back then. However, the Marshall record book estimates career totals for them and includes them in the official career rushing yards list.

=== Rushing yards ===
Career
| Rk | Player | Yards | Years |
|---|---|---|---|
| 1 | Chris Parker | 5,924 | 1992 1993 1994 1995 |
| 2 | Doug Chapman | 4,016 | 1996 1997 1998 1999 |
| 3 | Ron Darby | 3,903 | 1986 1987 1988 1989 |
| 4 | Jackie Hunt | 3,900 | 1939 1940 1941 |
| 5 | Ahmad Bradshaw | 2,982 | 2004 2005 2006 |
| 6 | John Zontini | 2,900 | 1931 1932 1933 1934 |
| 7 | Darius Marshall | 2,857 | 2007 2008 2009 |
| 8 | Brenden Knox | 2,852 | 2018 2019 2020 |
| 9 | Rasheen Ali | 2,831 | 2020 2021 2022 2023 |
| 10 | Glenn Pedro | 2,724 | 1990 1991 1992 1993 |

Single season
| Rk | Player | Yards | Year |
|---|---|---|---|
| 1 | Chris Parker | 1,833 | 1995 |
| 2 | Devon Johnson | 1,767 | 2014 |
| 3 | Chris Parker | 1,750 | 1993 |
| 4 | Chris Parker | 1,728 | 1994 |
| 5 | Ahmad Bradshaw | 1,523 | 2006 |
| 6 | Khalan Laborn | 1,513 | 2022 |
| 7 | Ron Darby | 1,506 | 1987 |
| 8 | Rasheen Ali | 1,401 | 2021 |
| 9 | Brenden Knox | 1,387 | 2019 |
| 10 | Erik Thomas | 1,296 | 1996 |

Single game
| Rk | Player | Yards | Year | Opponent |
|---|---|---|---|---|
| 1 | Devon Johnson | 272 | 2014 | Florida Atlantic |
| 2 | Ron Darby | 262 | 1988 | Western Carolina |
| 3 | Ahmad Bradshaw | 261 | 2006 | UTEP |
| 4 | Larry Fourqurean | 245 | 1981 | Appalachian State |
| 5 | Ahmad Bradshaw | 242 | 2006 | UAB |
| 6 | Steward Butler | 233 | 2014 | Western Kentucky |
| 7 | Jack Mahone | 224 | 1963 | Kent State |
| 8 | Brenden Knox | 220 | 2019 | Florida Atlantic |
| 9 | Ron Lear | 218 | 1979 | Furman |
| 10 | Chris Parker | 209 | 1993 | Chattanooga |

=== Rushing touchdowns ===
Career
| Rk | Player | TDs | Years |
|---|---|---|---|
| 1 | Chris Parker | 68 | 1992 1993 1994 1995 |
| 2 | Doug Chapman | 52 | 1996 1997 1998 1999 |
| 3 | Jackie Hunt | 43 | 1939 1940 1941 |
| 4 | Tom Stark | 41 | 1927 1928 1929 1930 |
| 5 | Rasheen Ali | 39 | 2020 2021 2022 2023 |
| 6 | Ron Darby | 38 | 1986 1987 1988 1989 |
| 7 | Glenn Pedro | 31 | 1990 1991 1992 1993 |
| | Ahmad Bradshaw | 31 | 2004 2005 2006 |
| 9 | Franklin Wallace | 29 | 2000 2001 2002 2003 |
| 10 | John Zontini | 27 | 1931 1932 1933 1934 |

Single season
| Rk | Player | TDs | Year |
|---|---|---|---|
| 1 | Jackie Hunt | 27 | 1940 |
| 2 | Chris Parker | 23 | 1993 |
| | Chris Parker | 23 | 1994 |
| | Rasheen Ali | 23 | 2021 |
| 5 | Ahmad Bradshaw | 19 | 2006 |
| 6 | Chris Parker | 18 | 1995 |
| 7 | Devon Johnson | 17 | 2014 |
| 8 | Mickey Jackson | 16 | 1965 |
| | Ron Darby | 16 | 1987 |
| | Ron Darby | 16 | 1988 |
| | Khalan Laborn | 16 | 2022 |

Single game
| Rk | Player | TDs | Year | Opponent |
|---|---|---|---|---|
| 1 | Jackie Hunt | 5 | 1940 | Detroit Tech |
| | Ahmad Bradshaw | 5 | 2006 | UTEP |

== Receiving ==
=== Receptions ===
Career
| Rk | Player | Rec | Years |
|---|---|---|---|
| 1 | Tommy Shuler | 322 | 2011 2012 2013 2014 |
| 2 | Josh Davis | 306 | 2001 2002 2003 2004 |
| 3 | Darius Watts | 272 | 2000 2001 2002 2003 |
| 4 | Mike Barber | 249 | 1985 1986 1987 1988 |
| 5 | Tim Martin | 221 | 1993 1994 1995 1996 |
| 6 | Nate Poole | 212 | 1997 1998 1999 2000 |
| 7 | Cody Slate | 199 | 2006 2007 2008 2009 |
| 8 | Corey Gammage | 178 | 2019 2020 2021 2022 |
| 9 | Ricky Carter | 176 | 1992 1993 1994 1995 |
| 10 | John "Fuzzy" Filliez | 168 | 1973 1974 1975 1976 |
| | Randy Moss | 168 | 1996 1997 |

Single season
| Rk | Player | Rec | Year |
|---|---|---|---|
| 1 | Tommy Shuler | 110 | 2012 |
| 2 | Mike Barber | 106 | 1987 |
| | Tommy Shuler | 106 | 2013 |
| 4 | Troy Brown | 101 | 1992 |
| 5 | Sean Doctor | 96 | 1987 |
| 6 | Tommy Shuler | 92 | 2014 |
| 7 | Darius Watts | 91 | 2001 |
| 8 | Randy Moss | 90 | 1997 |
| 9 | Denero Marriott | 86 | 2002 |
| | Josh Davis | 86 | 2004 |

Single game
| Rk | Player | Rec | Year | Opponent |
|---|---|---|---|---|
| 1 | Tommy Shuler | 19 | 2012 | Purdue |
| 2 | Tommy Shuler | 18 | 2014 | Northern Illinois |
| 3 | David Foye | 15 | 2000 | Kent State |
| | Denero Marriott | 15 | 2001 | East Carolina |
| | Josh Davis | 15 | 2001 | Akron |
| 6 | Mike Barber | 14 | 1987 | Western Carolina |
| | Tommy Shuler | 14 | 2012 | East Carolina |
| 8 | Randy Clarkson | 13 | 1985 | Ohio |
| | Randy Moss | 13 | 1997 | Ball State |
| | Antavious Wilson | 13 | 2009 | Southern Miss |

=== Receiving yards ===
Career
| Rk | Player | Yards | Years |
|---|---|---|---|
| 1 | Mike Barber | 4,262 | 1985 1986 1987 1988 |
| 2 | Darius Watts | 4,031 | 2000 2001 2002 2003 |
| 3 | Josh Davis | 3,889 | 2001 2002 2003 2004 |
| 4 | Tommy Shuler | 3,563 | 2011 2012 2013 2014 |
| 5 | Randy Moss | 3,467 | 1996 1997 |
| 6 | Tim Martin | 2,886 | 1993 1994 1995 1996 |
| 7 | Nate Poole | 2,775 | 1997 1998 1999 |
| 8 | Troy Brown | 2,746 | 1991 1992 |
| 9 | Cody Slate | 2,619 | 2006 2007 2008 2009 |
| 10 | Aaron Dobson | 2,398 | 2009 2010 2011 2012 |

Single season
| Rk | Player | Yards | Year |
|---|---|---|---|
| 1 | Mike Barber | 1,757 | 1987 |
| 2 | Randy Moss | 1,709 | 1996 |
| 3 | Troy Brown | 1,654 | 1992 |
| 4 | Randy Moss | 1,647 | 1997 |
| 5 | Darius Watts | 1,417 | 2001 |
| 6 | Sean Doctor | 1,372 | 1987 |
| 7 | Mike Barber | 1,325 | 1988 |
| 8 | Brian Dowler | 1,197 | 1991 |
| 9 | Josh Davis | 1,191 | 2002 |
| 10 | Mike Barber | 1,180 | 1986 |

Single game
| Rk | Player | Yards | Year | Opponent |
|---|---|---|---|---|
| 1 | Randy Moss | 288 | 1996 | Delaware |
| 2 | Josh Davis | 264 | 2002 | Appalachian State |
| 3 | Andre Motley | 262 | 1990 | Chattanooga |
| 4 | Troy Brown | 248 | 1991 | VMI |
| | Tyre Brady | 248 | 2017 | NC State |
| 6 | Denero Marriott | 234 | 2001 | East Carolina |
| 7 | Davonte Allen | 232 | 2015 | Charlotte |
| 8 | Mike Barber | 222 | 1988 | East Tennessee State |
| 9 | Randy Moss | 220 | 1996 | Montana |
| 10 | Randy Moss | 216 | 1997 | Kent State |

=== Receiving touchdowns ===
Career
| Rk | Player | TDs | Years |
|---|---|---|---|
| 1 | Randy Moss | 53 | 1996 1997 |
| 2 | Darius Watts | 47 | 2000 2001 2002 2003 |
| 3 | Gator Hoskins | 28 | 2010 2011 2012 2013 |
| 4 | Mike Barber | 26 | 1985 1986 1987 1988 |
| 5 | Tommy Shuler | 25 | 2011 2012 2013 2014 |
| 6 | Troy Brown | 24 | 1991 1992 |
| | Aaron Dobson | 24 | 2009 2010 2011 2012 |
| 8 | Tim Martin | 23 | 1993 1994 1995 |
| | Josh Davis | 23 | 2001 2002 2003 2004 |
| | Cody Slate | 23 | 2006 2007 2008 2009 |

Single season
| Rk | Player | TDs | Year |
|---|---|---|---|
| 1 | Randy Moss | 28 | 1996 |
| 2 | Randy Moss | 25 | 1997 |
| 3 | Darius Watts | 18 | 2001 |
| 4 | Troy Brown | 16 | 1992 |
| 5 | Gator Hoskins | 15 | 2013 |
| 6 | Brian Dowler | 13 | 1991 |
| | James Williams | 13 | 1999 |
| 8 | Keith Baxter | 12 | 1987 |
| | Darius Watts | 12 | 2002 |
| | Aaron Dobson | 12 | 2011 |

Single game
| Rk | Player | TDs | Year | Opponent |
|---|---|---|---|---|
| 1 | Randy Moss | 5 | 1997 | Ball State |
| 2 | Randy Moss | 4 | 1996 | Montana |
| | Denero Marriott | 4 | 2001 | Toledo |

== Total offense ==
Total offense is the sum of passing and rushing statistics. It does not include receiving or returns.

=== Total offense yards ===
Career
| Rk | Player | Yards | Years |
|---|---|---|---|
| 1 | Rakeem Cato | 14,918 | 2011 2012 2013 2014 |
| 2 | Chad Pennington | 13,048 | 1995 1997 1998 1999 |
| 3 | Byron Leftwich | 12,084 | 1998 1999 2000 2001 2002 |
| 4 | Michael Payton | 9,704 | 1989 1990 1991 1992 |
| 5 | Todd Donnan | 7,057 | 1991 1992 1993 1994 |
| 6 | John Gregory | 6,720 | 1986 1987 1988 1989 |
| 7 | Bernard Morris | 6,705 | 2004 2005 2006 2007 |
| 8 | Carl Fodor | 6,377 | 1982 1983 1984 1985 |
| 9 | Tony Petersen | 6,268 | 1986 1987 |
| 10 | Chris Parker | 5,924 | 1992 1993 1994 1995 |

Single season
| Rk | Player | Yards | Year |
|---|---|---|---|
| 1 | Tony Petersen | 4,737 | 1987 |
| 2 | Rakeem Cato | 4,385 | 2014 |
| 3 | Byron Leftwich | 4,267 | 2002 |
| 4 | Rakeem Cato | 4,232 | 2012 |
| 5 | Byron Leftwich | 4,224 | 2001 |
| 6 | Rakeem Cato | 4,210 | 2013 |
| 7 | Chad Pennington | 3,902 | 1999 |
| 8 | Michael Payton | 3,744 | 1992 |
| 9 | Bernard Morris | 3,637 | 2007 |
| 10 | Grant Wells | 3,588 | 2021 |

Single game
| Rk | Player | Yards | Year | Opponent |
|---|---|---|---|---|
| 1 | Byron Leftwich | 566 | 2001 | East Carolina |
| 2 | Chase Litton | 497 | 2015 | Charlotte |
| 3 | Byron Leftwich | 495 | 2001 | Central Michigan |

=== Touchdowns responsible for ===
"Touchdowns responsible for" is the official NCAA term for combined passing and rushing touchdowns.

Career
| Rk | Player | TDs | Years |
|---|---|---|---|
| 1 | Rakeem Cato | 146 | 2011 2012 2013 2014 |
| 2 | Chad Pennington | 104 | 1995 1997 1998 1999 |
| 3 | Byron Leftwich | 95 | 1998 1999 2000 2001 2002 |

Single season
| Rk | Player | TDs | Year |
|---|---|---|---|
| 1 | Rakeem Cato | 48 | 2014 |
| 2 | Rakeem Cato | 45 | 2013 |
| 3 | Byron Leftwich | 40 | 2001 |
| 4 | Rakeem Cato | 38 | 2012 |
| 5 | Tony Petersen | 36 | 1987 |
| | Eric Kresser | 36 | 1996 |
| 7 | Michael Payton | 35 | 1992 |
| 8 | Todd Donnan | 34 | 1994 |
| 9 | Byron Leftwich | 33 | 2002 |
| 10 | Michael Payton | 28 | 1991 |

Single game
| Rk | Player | TDs | Year | Opponent |
|---|---|---|---|---|
| 1 | Rakeem Cato | 7 | 2014 | Western Kentucky |

== Defense ==
=== Interceptions ===
Career
| Rk | Player | Ints | Years |
|---|---|---|---|
| 1 | Reggie Giles | 19 | 1985 1986 1987 1988 |
| 2 | Larry Coyer | 13 | 1962 1963 1964 |
| | Joe Chirico | 13 | 1990 1991 1992 |
| | Danny Derricott | 13 | 1997 1998 1999 2000 |
| 5 | Melvin Cunningham | 12 | 1993 1994 1995 1996 |
| | Micah Abraham | 12 | 2019 2020 2021 2022 2023 |
| 7 | Shannon Morrison | 11 | 1991 1992 1993 1994 |
| | Rogers Beckett | 11 | 1996 1997 1998 1999 |
| 9 | Glenn Bates | 10 | 1982 1983 |
| | Von Woodson | 10 | 1986 1987 1988 1989 |
| | Mark Snyder | 10 | 1987 |
| | Jayson Grayson | 10 | 1993 1994 1995 |

Single season
| Rk | Player | Ints | Year |
|---|---|---|---|
| 1 | Mark Snyder | 10 | 1987 |
| 2 | Reggie Giles | 8 | 1986 |
| 3 | Reggie Giles | 7 | 1987 |
| 4 | Von Woodson | 6 | 1988 |
| | Shannon Morrison | 6 | 1994 |
| | Danny Derricott | 6 | 1998 |
| | Chris Royal | 6 | 2004 |
| | Micah Abraham | 6 | 2022 |

Single game
| Rk | Player | Ints | Year | Opponent |
|---|---|---|---|---|
| 1 | Jackie Hunt | 3 | 1941 | Wake Forest |
| | George Barlow | 3 | 1989 | East Tennessee State |
| | Joe Chirico | 3 | 1990 | Appalachian State |

=== Tackles ===
Career
| Rk | Player | Tackles | Years |
|---|---|---|---|
| 1 | Roger Johnson | 548 | 1991 1992 1993 1994 |
| 2 | Bill Yanossy | 471 | 1973 1974 1975 1976 |
| 3 | Larry McCloud | 451 | 1994 1995 1996 1997 |
| 4 | William King | 443 | 1990 1991 1992 1993 |
| 5 | Mario Harvey | 420 | 2007 2008 2009 2010 |
| 6 | Donahue Stephenson | 420 | 1990 1991 1992 1993 |
| 7 | John Grace | 414 | 1996 1997 1998 1999 |
| 8 | Shannon King | 409 | 1990 1991 1992 1993 |
| 9 | John Spellacy | 392 | 1985 1986 1987 1988 |
| 10 | Max Yates | 382 | 1998 1999 2000 2001 |

Single season
| Rk | Player | Tackles | Year |
|---|---|---|---|
| 1 | John Spellacy | 189 | 1987 |
| 2 | William King | 178 | 1993 |
| 3 | Duran Smith | 160 | 2002 |
| 4 | Max Yates | 159 | 2001 |
| 5 | Bill Yanossy | 157 | 1974 |

Single game
| Rk | Player | Tackles | Year | Opponent |
|---|---|---|---|---|
| 1 | Charles Henry | 30 | 1972 | Miami (Ohio) |

=== Sacks ===
Career
| Rk | Player | Sacks | Years |
|---|---|---|---|
| 1 | B. J. Cohen | 51.0 | 1994 1995 1996 1997 |
| 2 | Billy Lyon | 30.0 | 1993 1994 1995 1996 |
| 3 | Johnathan Goddard | 27.5 | 2001 2002 2003 2004 |
| 4 | Vinny Curry | 26.5 | 2008 2009 2010 2011 |
| 5 | Cecil Fletcher | 23.0 | 1985 1986 1987 |
| | John Duncan | 23.0 | 1993 1994 1995 1996 |
| 7 | Mike Green | 21.5 | 2023 2024 |
| 8 | Albert McClellan | 20.0 | 2005 2006 2007 2008 2009 |
| 9 | Jamus Martin | 19.5 | 2001 2002 2003 2004 |
| 10 | Gary Thompson | 19.0 | 2013 2014 2015 2016 |
| | Koby Cumberlander | 19.0 | 2018 2019 2020 2021 2022 |
| | Owen Porter | 19.0 | 2019 2020 2021 2022 2023 |

Single season
| Rk | Player | Sacks | Year |
|---|---|---|---|
| 1 | Cecil Fletcher | 17.0 | 1987 |
| | Mike Green | 17.0 | 2024 |
| 3 | B. J. Cohen | 16.0 | 1995 |
| | Johnathan Goddard | 16.0 | 2004 |
| 5 | Tony Bolland | 14.0 | 1987 |
| 6 | B. J. Cohen | 13.0 | 1997 |

Single game
| Rk | Player | Sacks | Year | Opponent |
|---|---|---|---|---|
| 1 | Johnathan Goddard | 4.0 | 2004 | Miami (Ohio) |

== Kicking ==
=== Field goals made ===
Career
| Rk | Player | FGs | Years |
|---|---|---|---|
| 1 | Dewey Klein | 54 | 1988 1989 1990 1991 |

Single season
| Rk | Player | FGs | Year |
|---|---|---|---|
| 1 | Lorcan Quinn | 21 | 2025 |
| 2 | Dewey Klein | 19 | 1988 |
| | David Merrick | 19 | 1993 |
| | Tim Openlander | 19 | 1995 |
| 5 | Nick Smith | 18 | 2015 |
| | Justin Rohrwasser | 18 | 2019 |
| 7 | Justin Haig | 17 | 2014 |

Single game
| Rk | Player | FGs | Year | Opponent |
|---|---|---|---|---|
| 1 | Jorge Diaz Nicolas | 5 | 2026 | Old Dominion |
| 2 | David Merrick | 4 | 1993 | East Tennessee State |
| | Tim Openlander | 4 | 1995 | The Citadel |
| | Billy Malashevich | 4 | 1999 | Miami (Ohio) |
| | Justin Haig | 4 | 2014 | Louisiana Tech |
| | Justin Rohrwasser | 4 | 2019 | Western Kentucky |
| | Rece Verhoff | 4 | 2022 | Old Dominion |
| | Lorcan Quinn | 4 | 2025 | Texas State |
