= List of Marshall Thundering Herd in the NFL draft =

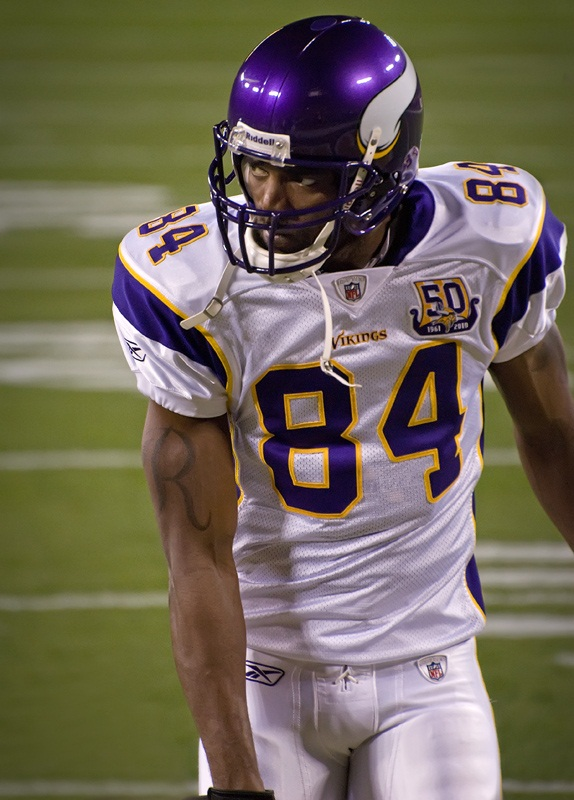
Randy Moss was drafted 21st overall by the Minnesota Vikings in the 1998 NFL draft

The Marshall Thundering Herd football team, representing Marshall University, has had 47 players drafted into the National Football League (NFL) since the league began holding drafts in 1936. (Note: Because of the NFL–AFL merger agreement, the history of the AFL is officially recognized by the NFL and therefore this list includes the AFL draft (1960–1966) and the common draft (1967–1969).) This includes three players taken in the first round. The New England Patriots have drafted the most Marshall players with five. Four former Thundering Herd have been selected to a Pro Bowl, six former Thundering Herd have won a league championship with their respective teams, and one former Thundering have been selected to both a Pro Bowl and won a league championship.

Each NFL franchise seeks to add new players through the annual NFL draft. The draft rules were last updated in 2009. The team with the worst record the previous year picks first, the next-worst team second, and so on. Teams that did not make the playoffs are ordered by their regular-season record with any remaining ties broken by strength of schedule. Playoff participants are sequenced after non-playoff teams, based on their round of elimination (wild card, division, conference, and Super Bowl).

Before the merger agreements in 1966, the American Football League (AFL) operated in direct competition with the NFL and held a separate draft. This led to a massive bidding war over top prospects between the two leagues. As part of the merger agreement on June 8, 1966, the two leagues would hold a multiple round "common draft". When the AFL officially merged with the NFL in 1970, the common draft simply became the NFL draft.

== Key ==
B	Back	K	Kicker	NT	Nose tackle
C	Center	LB	Linebacker	FB	Fullback
DB	Defensive back	P	Punter	HB	Halfback
DE	Defensive end	QB	Quarterback	WR	Wide receiver
DT	Defensive tackle	RB	Running back	G	Guard
E	End	T	Offensive tackle	TE	Tight end

*	Selected to a Pro Bowl
†	Won an NFL/Super Bowl championship
‡	Selected to a Pro Bowl and won an NFL/Super Bowl championship

== Selections ==
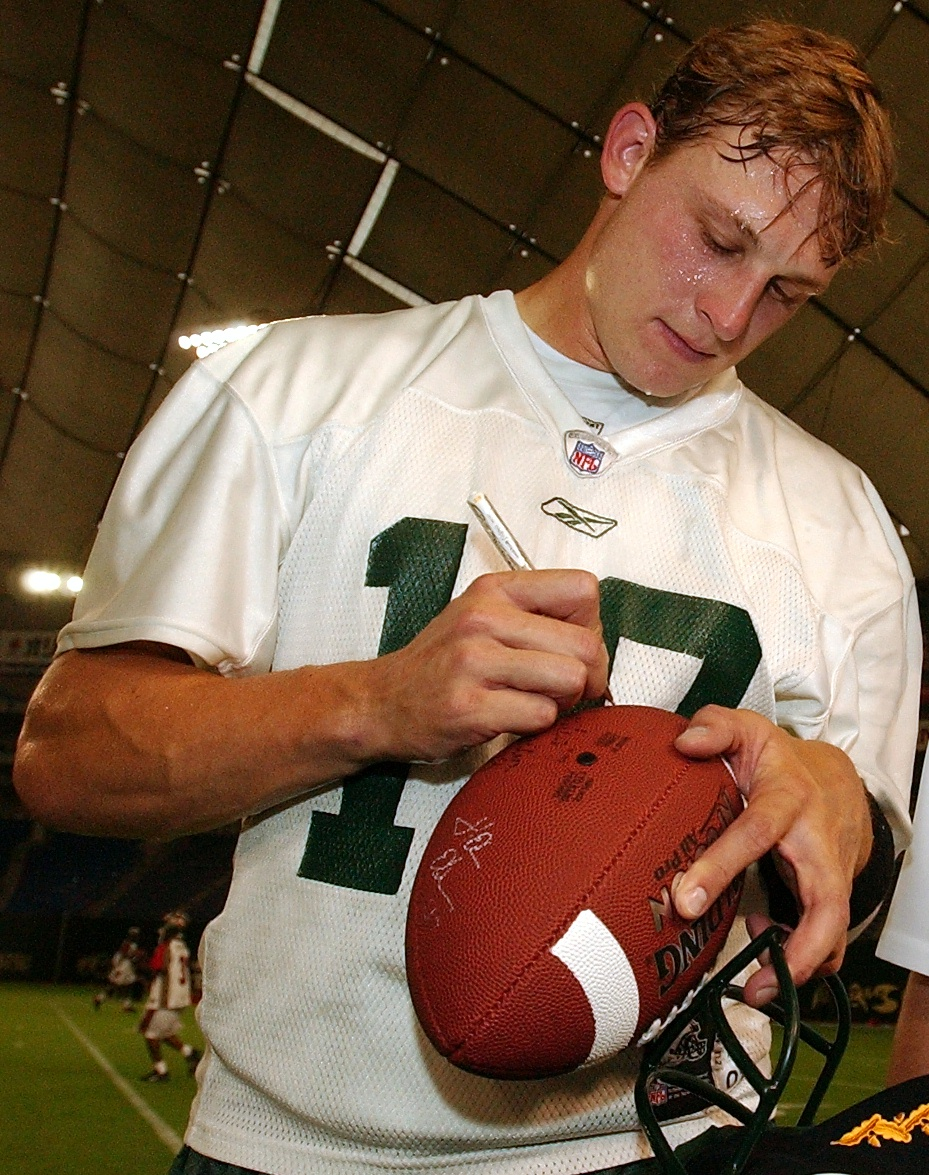
Chad Pennington was drafted eighteenth overall by the New York Jets in the 2000 NFL draft.

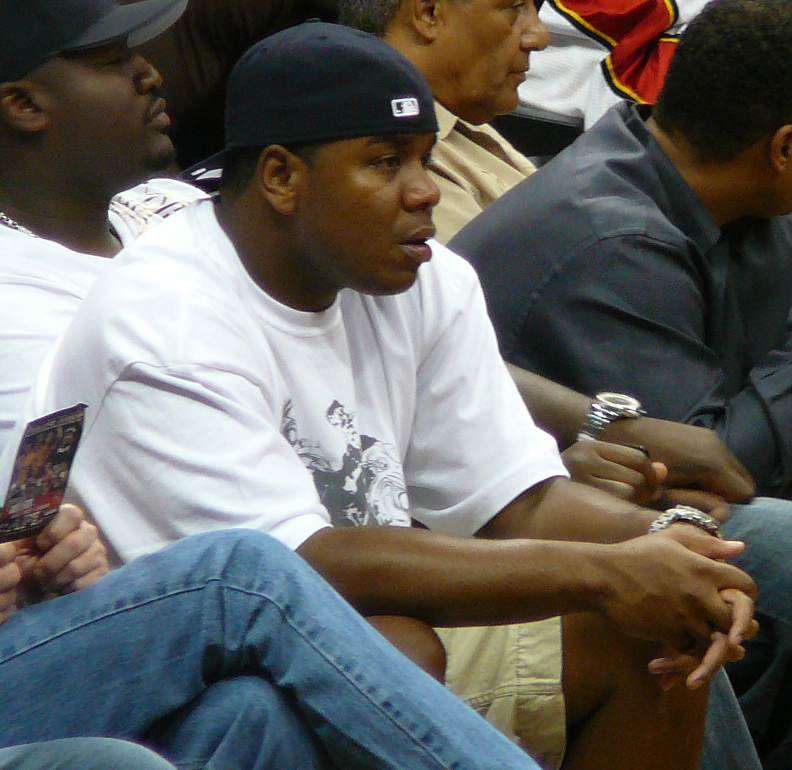
Byron Leftwich was drafted seventh overall by the Jacksonville Jaguars in the 2003 NFL draft.

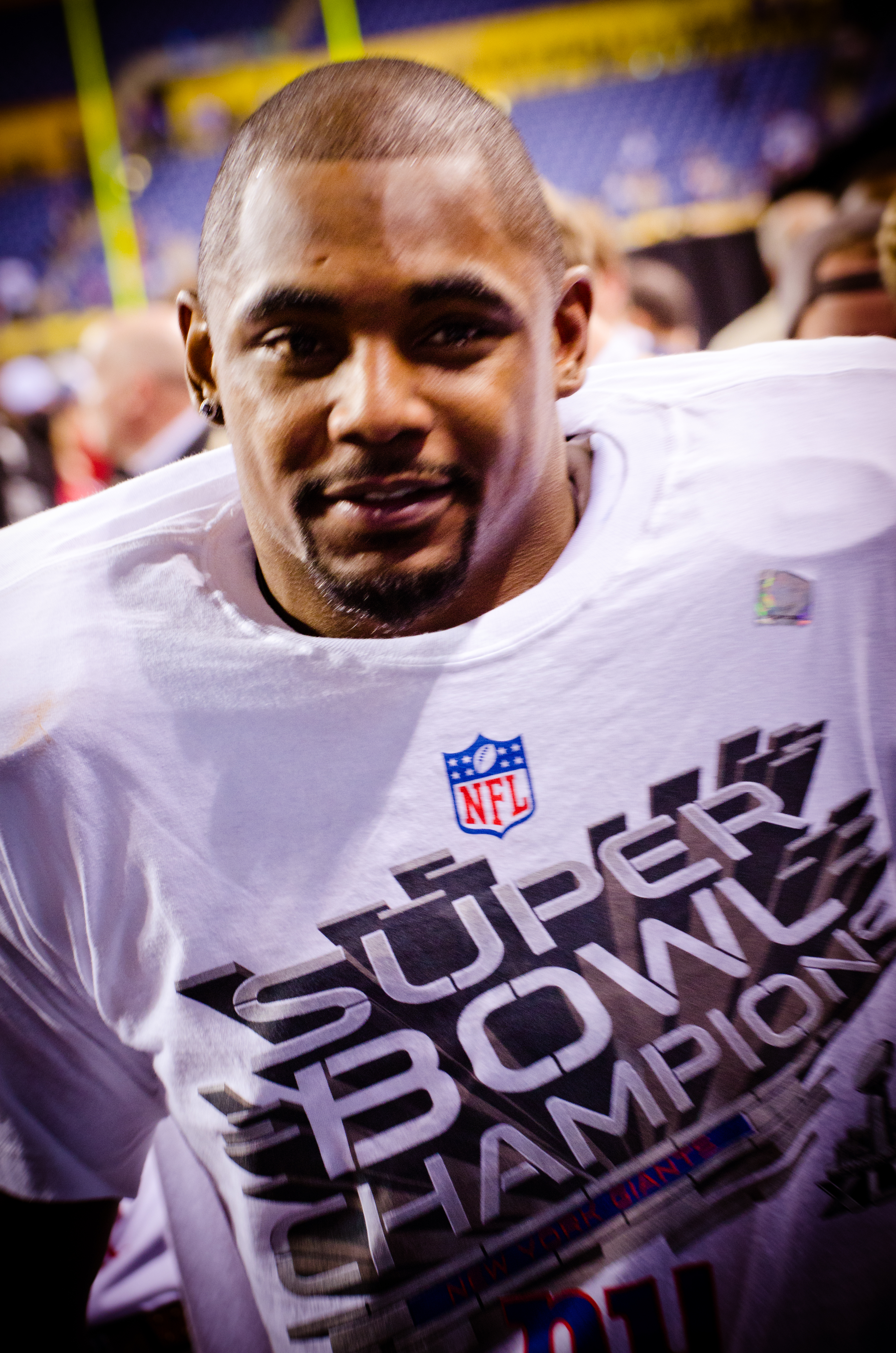
Ahmad Bradshaw was drafted 250th overall by the New York Giants in the 2007 NFL draft.

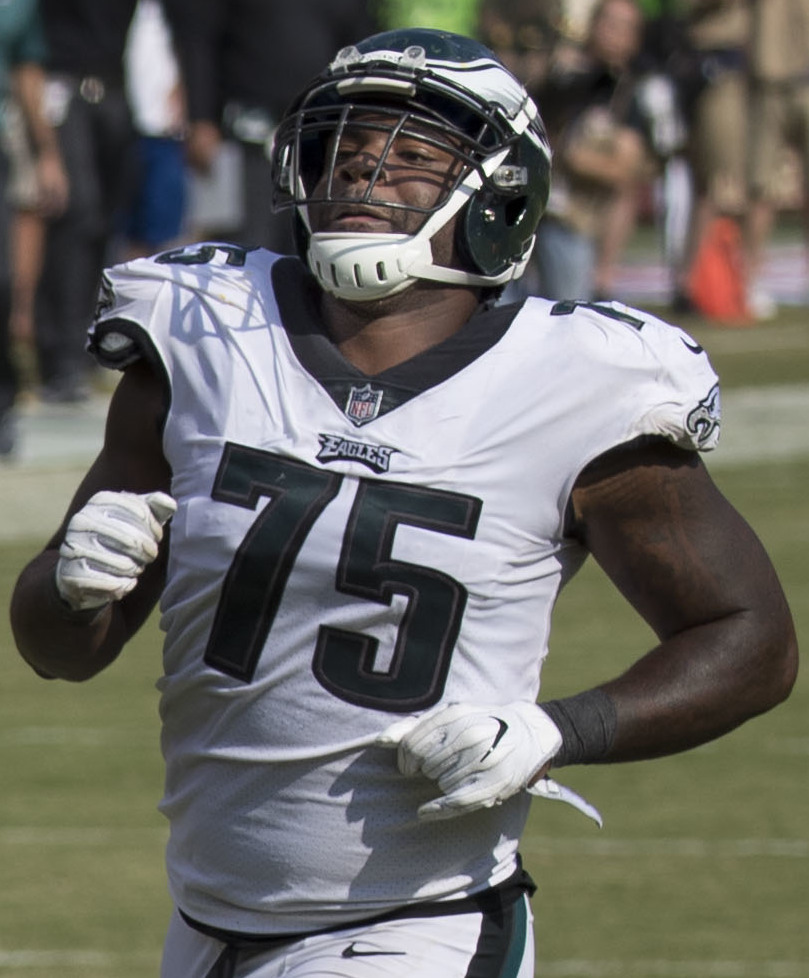
Vinny Curry was drafted 59th overall by the Philadelphia Eagles in the 2012 NFL draft.

Year	Round	Pick	Overall	Player	Team (Note: This is the team that drafted the player, not their most recent team.)	Position	Notes
1939	17	1	151	Ev Elkins	Chicago Cardinals	B	—
1939	18	2	162	Frank Huffman	Chicago Cardinals	E	—
1940	14	6	126	Jack Morlock	Detroit Lions	B	—
1941	7	3	53	Jim Roberts	Pittsburgh Steelers	C	—
1942	13	10	120	Jackie Hunt	Chicago Bears	B	—
1948	21	8	193	Charlie Snyder	Pittsburgh Steelers	T	—
1950	13	13	170	Norm Willey*	Philadelphia Eagles	B	Pro Bowl (1954, 1955); All-Pro (1954)
1954	13	12	157	Jim Swierczek	Detroit Lions	B	—
1955	18	5	210	Albie Maier	Pittsburgh Steelers	G	—
1956	8	12	97	Len Hellyer	Cleveland Browns	B	—
1958	15	1	170	Ray Dunlap	Chicago Cardinals	B	—
1958	24	11	288	Jim O'Connor	Cleveland Browns	T	—
1959	29	3	338	Jim O'Connor	Chicago Cardinals	T	—
1962	17	10	234	Rucker Wickline	Detroit Lions	C	—
1964	18	13	251	Mike Hicks	Green Bay Packers	G	—
1965	16	1	211	Tom Good	New York Giants	B	—
1967	14	12	353	Andy Socha	Washington Redskins	RB	—
1983	7	18	186	Carl Lee*	Minnesota Vikings	DB	Pro Bowl (1988, 1989, 1990); All-Pro (1988)
1989	4	28	112	Michael Barber^{†}	San Francisco 49ers	WR	Super Bowl champion (XXIV)
1989	6	25	164	Sean Doctor	Buffalo Bills	TE	—
1993	8	2	198	Troy Brown^{‡}	New England Patriots	WR	Pro Bowl (2001); Super Bowl champion (XXXVI, XXXVIII, XXXIX)
1998	1	21	21	Randy Moss*	Minnesota Vikings	WR	Pro Bowl (1998, 1999, 2000, 2002, 2003, 2007); All-Pro (1998, 2000, 2003, 2007); NFL Offensive Rookie of the Year (1998); Pro Football Hall of Fame Inductee (2018)
1998	5	25	148	John Wade	Jacksonville Jaguars	C	—
2000	1	18	18	Chad Pennington	New York Jets	QB	NFL Comeback Player of the Year (2006, 2008)
2000	2	12	43	Rogers Beckett	San Diego Chargers	DB	—
2000	3	26	88	Doug Chapman	Minnesota Vikings	RB	—
2000	6	9	175	James Williams	Seattle Seahawks	WR	—
2001	2	20	51	Paul Toviessi	Denver Broncos	DE	—
2002	7	32	243	Chris Massey	St. Louis Rams	FB	—
2003	1	7	7	Byron Leftwich^{†}	Jacksonville Jaguars	QB	Super Bowl champion (XLIII)
2003	3	20	84	Chris Crocker	Cleveland Browns	DB	—
2003	4	25	122	Steve Sciullo	Indianapolis Colts	T	—
2004	2	22	54	Darius Watts	Denver Broncos	WR	—
2005	6	32	206	Johnathan Goddard^{†}	Detroit Lions	DE	Super Bowl champion (XLI)
2007	7	40	250	Ahmad Bradshaw^{†}	New York Giants	RB	Super Bowl champion (XLII, XLVI)
2011	5	28	159	Lee Smith	New England Patriots	TE	—
2012	2	27	59	Vinny Curry^{†}	Philadelphia Eagles	DE	Super Bowl champion (LII)
2013	2	27	59	Aaron Dobson^{†}	New England Patriots	WR	Super Bowl champion (XLIX)
2014	6	23	199	Garrett Scott	Seattle Seahawks	T	—
2015	7	30	247	Darryl Roberts	New England Patriots	DB	—
2020	5	14	159	Justin Rohrwasser	New England Patriots	K	—
2020	7	29	243	Chris Jackson	Tennessee Titans	DB	—
2021	4	33	138	Josh Ball	Dallas Cowboys	T	—
2022	7	38	259	Nazeeh Johnson^{†}	Kansas City Chiefs	DB	Super Bowl champion (LVII, LVIII)
2024	5	30	165	Rasheen Ali	Baltimore Ravens	RB	—
2024	6	25	201	Micah Abraham	Indianapolis Colts	DB	—
2025	2	27	59	Mike Green	Baltimore Ravens	DE	—

== Notable undrafted players ==
Note: No drafts held before 1920

Debut year	Player name	Position	Debut NFL/AFL team	Notes
1946	Frank Gatski^{†}	C	Cleveland Browns	Pro Bowl (1956); NFL champion (1950, 1954, 1955)
1960	Jim Barton	C	Dallas Texans	—
1984	Terry Echols	LB	Pittsburgh Steelers	—
1987	Alan Huff	DT	Pittsburgh Steelers	—
1987	Sam Manos	C	Cincinnati Bengals	—
1993	Mike Bartrum^{*}	TE	Kansas City Chiefs	Pro Bowl (2005)
1996	Chris Parker	RB	Jacksonville Jaguars	—
1997	Eric Kresser	QB	Cincinnati Bengals	—
1997	Billy Lyon	DT	Kansas City Chiefs	—
1997	Jamie Wilson	T	Carolina Panthers	—
1999	Chris Hanson^{*}	P	Cleveland Browns	Pro Bowl (2002)
1999	Jermaine Wiggins	TE	New York Jets	—
2000	Giradie Mercer	DT	Philadelphia Eagles	—
2000	Andre O'Neal	LB	Kansas City Chiefs	—
2000	Jason Starkey	C	Arizona Cardinals	—
2001	J. R. Jenkins	K	Baltimore Ravens	—
2001	Nate Poole	WR	Arizona Cardinals	—
2002	Max Yates	LB	Minnesota Vikings	—
2004	Jason Rader	TE	Atlanta Falcons	—
2008	Doug Legursky^{†}	C	Pittsburgh Steelers	Super Bowl champion (XLIII)
2009	C. J. Spillman	DB	San Diego Chargers	—
2010	Daniel Baldridge	T	Jacksonville Jaguars	—
2010	Albert McClellan^{†}	LB	Baltimore Ravens	Super Bowl champion (XLVII, LIII)
2011	Mario Harvey	LB	Pittsburgh Steelers	—
2012	Omar Brown^{†}	DB	Baltimore Ravens	Super Bowl champion (XLVII)
2014	Gator Hoskins	TE	Miami Dolphins	—
2015	Neville Hewitt	LB	Miami Dolphins	—
2016	Devon Johnson	RB/FB	Carolina Panthers	—
2017	Emanuel Byrd	TE	Kansas City Chiefs	—
2017	Michael Clark	WR	Green Bay Packers	—
2019	Ryan Bee	DE	Washington Redskins	—
2019	Kaare Vedvik	P	New York Jets	—
2020	Omari Cobb	LB	Kansas City Chiefs	—
2021	Tavante Beckett	LB	Detroit Lions	—
2023	Steven Gilmore Jr.	CB	Detroit Lions	—
2024	Ethan Driskell	OL	Kansas City Chiefs	—
2024	Elias Neal	LB	Los Angeles Rams	–
2024	Dalton Tucker	OL	Indianapolis Colts	—
2025	J.J. Roberts	DB	Tampa Bay Buccaneers	
