= 2015 St. Petersburg Bowl =

- 8th St. Petersburg Bowl
| UConn Huskies | Marshall Thundering Herd |
| (6–6) | (9–3) |
| The American | C-USA |
| 10 | 16 |
| Head coach: Bob Diaco | Head coach: John "Doc" Holliday |
| | 1 | 2 | 3 | 4 | Total |
|---|---|---|---|---|---|
| UConn | 7 | 0 | 3 | 0 | 10 |
| Marshall | 7 | 6 | 0 | 3 | 16 |
- Date: December 26, 2015
- Season: 2015
- Stadium: Tropicana Field
- Location: St. Petersburg, Florida
- MVP: Marshall WR Deandre Reaves
- Favorite: Marshall by 4
- Referee: Kevin Mar (Mtn. West)
- Attendance: 14,652

United States TV coverage
- Network: ESPN/ESPN Radio
- Announcers: Tom Hart, Anthony Becht, & Tiffany Greene (ESPN); Drew Goodman, Rene Ingoglia, & Brett McMurphy (ESPN Radio)

The 2015 St. Petersburg Bowl was a post-season college football bowl game between the UConn Huskies of the American Athletic Conference and the Marshall Thundering Herd of Conference USA, played on December 26, 2015 at Tropicana Field in St. Petersburg, Florida. The game was the final contest of the 2015 FBS football season for both teams. It ended in a 16–10 victory for Marshall.

The Huskies were selected to play in the 2015 St. Petersburg Bowl following a 6–6 regular season highlighted by a win over the otherwise-undefeated Houston Cougars to achieve bowl eligibility. UConn faced Marshall, who finished their regular season with a 9–3 record and for the first time since 2012 did not qualify for the Conference USA championship game.

== Team selection ==
In 2015, the St. Petersburg Bowl selection committee had a contractual arrangement with the American Athletic Conference ("The American") and Conference USA (C-USA) to select a team from each conference. (Note: The bowl also had a backup arrangement with the Atlantic Coast Conference (ACC) to select a team from that conference should either The American or C-USA fail to provide a team. As both conferences had sufficient bowl-eligible team available, this backup arrangement did not come into play.) The American's arrangement began with the bowl's inception in 2008, through The American's predecessor, the Big East Conference. (Note: In 2014, The American became the successor to the Big East, which operated from 1979 through 2013. See 2010–13 Big East Conference realignment for more information.)

This game featured the UConn Huskies of The American against the Marshall Thundering Herd of C-USA in their first meeting against each other.

=== UConn ===
After finishing the regular season 6–6 (4–4 The American), the Huskies accepted an invitation to play in this game.

This was the Huskies' sixth bowl appearance and their first since the 2011 Fiesta Bowl where they lost to Oklahoma by a score of 48–20. This was their first bowl game in the state of Florida and their first against a team from Conference USA.

=== Marshall ===
After finishing the regular season 9–3 (6–2 C-USA), the Herd accepted an invitation to play in this game.

This was the Herd's twelfth bowl appearance and their second appearance in the St. Petersburg Bowl. They previously won the 2011 edition (then named the Beef 'O' Brady's Bowl) against FIU by a score of 20–10. This was their first bowl against a team from the American Athletic Conference.

== Game summary ==
=== First quarter ===
UConn received the opening kickoff to start the game. Running back Arkeel Newsome ran the ball on three straight plays but failed to gain the requisite ten yards required to earn a first down; the Huskies punted the ball to the Thundering Herd. After a running play by running back Hyleck Foster gained a single yard, Marshall achieved the first first down of the game on a 21-yard pass play from quarterback Chase Litton to wide receiver Deandre Reaves, moving the ball onto the UConn side of the field. The Herd drive stalled at that point; after two further running plays and an incomplete pass they punted, pinning the Huskies at their own 9-yard line. UConn was again unable to earn a first down, punting the ball back to Marshall. Reaves, serving as the punt returner, advanced the ball to the UConn 20-yard line, giving Marshall excellent field position. The Thundering Herd capitalized on their second play from scrimmage, a 16-yard play-action pass from Litton to tight end Ryan Yurachek for a touchdown. After Marshall successfully kicked the extra point, the score was 7–0 in their favor.

The Huskies responded to the Herd score on their next drive. Starting from the 25-yard line after a touchback on the kickoff, UConn earned five first downs in twelve plays, with Shirreffs converting all five off three runs and two passes. The last first down, a 17-yard pass to Newsome, gave the Huskies a 1st-and-goal from the Herd 8-yard line. UConn running back Ron Johnson scored on the next play, running the ball to the right and just making it into the end zone before being forced out of bounds. The Huskies converted the extra point, tying the score at 7–7.

On their next possession, Marshall was only able to convert one first down before being forced to punt. UConn had only enough time for one play, a pass from Shirreffs to Newsome for four yards, before the first quarter clock expired. The score remained tied 7–7 at the end of the quarter.

=== Second quarter ===
Starting the quarter with a 2nd-and-6 play from their own 24-yard line, UConn failed to gain the required yardage in two plays, forcing them to punt back to Marshall. Beginning at their own 32-yard line, the Herd drove down the field into the UConn red zone, earning a 1st-and-10 at the Huskies' 11-yard line. After three more plays, Marshall's drive stalled at the UConn 3-yard line. They were forced to settle for a 21-yard field goal by kicker Nick Smith, giving the Herd a 10–7 lead.

On the ensuing possession, UConn was able to reach midfield before being forced to punt. Marshall began their next drive from their own 4-yard line with just under 5 minutes left in the half. The Herd mixed running and passing plays, driving 85 yards over 14 plays and earning six first downs. With three seconds left in the half Smith kicked a 29-yard field goal—his second of the game—making the score 13–7 in Marshall's favor heading into halftime.

=== Third quarter ===
Marshall began their first drive of the second half from their own 25-yard line after the touchback on the kickoff. After a pass interference penalty on UConn cornerback Jhavon Williams moved the ball to the 40-yard line, Marshall converted three third downs as they moved down the field, on a pass play to Reaves and two runs by backup quarterback Michael Birdsong. A fourth third down play, an attempted pass from Birdsong to Yurachek, fell incomplete, bringing up 4th-and-2 from the UConn 17-yard line. After a timeout, the Herd eschewed another field goal and elected to go for the first down. Litton completed a pass to Reaves but for no gain, giving the ball back to the Huskies on loss of downs.

The Huskies would not take advantage of this opportunity, but would soon get another. After earning two first downs after a pass to tight end Alec Bloom and a pass interference call on cornerback Rodney Allen, Shirreffs' 2nd-and-8 pass at midfield was intercepted by safety Kendall Gant. Taking over from their own 44-yard line, Marshall converted two more third downs on passes from Litton to Reaves and to wide receiver Josh Knight. Facing 3rd-and-1 from the UConn 20-yard line, fullback Devon Johnson's run was stopped for no gain. After a false start penalty moved them back five yards, Marshall opted this time to kick the 43-yard field goal. The kick was missed, turning the ball back over to UConn.

Sherriffs responded to the missed kick with a first-down 15-yard run; the next play, he completed a pass to Newsome for ten yards. A 15-yard personal foul penalty on linebacker Devontre'a Tyler moved the ball to the Marshall 35-yard-line. The Huskies were unable to move the ball further, after a 2-yard run by Newsome, a sack on Shirreffs by defensive lineman Ryan Bee that gave back those two yards, and an incomplete pass intended for wide receiver Noel Thomas. UConn kicker Bobby Puyol converted the 52-yard field goal with seconds left in the quarter. After the kickoff and Marshall threw one incomplete pass, the third quarter ended with the score 13–10 in Marshall's favor.

=== Fourth quarter ===
After earning one first down on a pass to Yurachek, on 2nd-and-5 from the Marshall 33-yard line Litton threw a long pass that was intercepted by UConn cornerback Jamar Summers. Taking over at the UConn 10-yard line, Shirreffs led the team down the field, earning first downs on two runs and a pass to tight end Steve Hashemi. After a false start penalty on first down, the Huskies were stopped again at midfield, forcing a punt that was fair-caught by Reaves at the Herd 5-yard line. Marshall's responding drive was led by running back Keion Davis. He uncorked a 41-yard run on his third of five consecutive runs to open the drive; he would carry the ball on ten out of thirteen plays, running over six minutes off the game clock and forcing UConn to use all of its remaining timeouts. The drive finally was stopped at the UConn 15-yard line. Smith kicked a 32-yard field goal—his third of the game—to give Marshall a 16–10 lead.

UConn received the next kickoff with 1:44 left in the game, needing a touchdown to tie the score and an extra-point conversion to take the lead. Beginning at the 25-yard line after the touchback, on the first play from scrimmage Shirreffs completed a pass to Mayala for fifteen yards and a first down. On the second play, Shirreffs was sacked by defensive lineman Gary Thompson, losing three yards. A completed pass to wide receiver Tyraiq Beals for four yards brought up 3rd-and-9 from the UConn 41-yard line. Shirreffs' next two passes fell incomplete, turning the football over to Marshall on downs. With only 0:21 left and the Huskies out of timeouts, the Herd were content to take a knee to run out the clock and end the game. The final score was 16–10 in Marshall's favor.

=== Scoring summary ===
Scoring summary

| Quarter | Time | Drive | | | Team | Scoring information | Score | |
| Quarter | Time | Plays | Yards | TOP | Team | Scoring information | UCONN | MRSH |
|---|---|---|---|---|---|---|---|---|
| 1 | 8:10 | 2 | 20 | 0:49 | MRSH | Ryan Yurachek 16-yard touchdown reception from Chase Litton, Nick Smith kick good | 0 | 7 |
| 1 | 1:51 | 13 | 75 | 6:19 | UCONN | Ron Johnson 8-yard touchdown run, Bobby Puyol kick good | 7 | 7 |
| 2 | 8:04 | 13 | 65 | 6:02 | MRSH | 21-yard field goal by Nick Smith | 7 | 10 |
| 2 | 0:00 | 15 | 85 | 4:57 | MRSH | 29-yard field goal by Nick Smith | 7 | 13 |
| 3 | 0:02 | 6 | 40 | 2:32 | UCONN | 52-yard field goal by Bobby Puyol | 10 | 13 |
| 4 | 1:44 | 13 | 80 | 6:35 | MRSH | 32-yard field goal by Nick Smith | 10 | 16 |
| "TOP" = time of possession. For other American football terms, see Glossary of American football. | | | | | | | 10 | 16 |

== Final statistics ==
Statistical comparison
| | UConn | Marshall |
|---|---|---|
| 1st downs | 15 | 24 |
| Total yards | 213 | 389 |
| Passing yards | 86 | 218 |
| Rushing yards | 127 | 171 |
| Penalties | 3–25 | 4–45 |
| 3rd down conversions | 3–10 | 11–17 |
| 4th down conversions | 0–1 | 0–1 |
| Turnovers | 1 | 1 |
| Time of possession | 25:18 | 34:42 |

For his performance in the 2015 St. Petersburg Bowl, Marshall wide receiver Deandre Reaves was named player of the game. Reaves caught nine passes for 88 yards, the longest being for 21 yards in the first quarter. He had a key punt return for 26 yards that set up the lone Marshall touchdown, and also returned a kickoff for 23 yards. (Note: The kickoff return was negated by a holding penalty on the kick return team.)

== See also ==
- Glossary of American football
- American football positions
