= 2001 GMAC Bowl =

- Highest-scoring bowl game
Marshall Thundering Herd	East Carolina Pirates
(10–2)	(6–5)
MAC	C-USA
64	61
Head coach: Bob Pruett	Head coach: Steve Logan
AP / Coaches / BCS; NR / 25 / NR
	1	2	3	4	OT	2OT	Total
Marshall	0	8	28	15	7	6	64
East Carolina	21	17	3	10	7	3	61
- Date: December 19, 2001
- Season: 2001
- Stadium: Ladd–Peebles Stadium
- Location: Mobile, Alabama
- MVP: Marshall QB Byron Leftwich
- Referee: Bill LeMonnier (Big Ten)
- Attendance: 40,139

United States TV coverage
- Network: ESPN2
- Announcers: Steve Levy (Play by Play); Todd Christensen (Analyst); Dave Ryan (Sideline)

The 2001 GMAC Bowl, a college football bowl game held on December 19 at Ladd–Peebles Stadium in Mobile, Alabama, pitted the Marshall Thundering Herd, then of the Mid-American Conference, against the East Carolina Pirates from Conference USA. This game featured what was then the biggest comeback in NCAA Division I-A (now Division I FBS) bowl history, as Marshall came back from a 38–8 halftime deficit to force overtime and eventually win 64–61 in double overtime. It was also the highest-scoring bowl game in history, breaking the previous record set when Texas Tech defeated Air Force 55–41 in the 1995 Copper Bowl. Although the record for greatest bowl comeback was broken by Texas Tech when it returned to the Copper Bowl, by then renamed the Insight Bowl, in 2006, the 2001 GMAC Bowl remains the highest-scoring bowl game ever.

The game, with an official attendance of 40,139, was telecast on ESPN2. It was a rematch of one of Marshall's most historically significant games. On November 14, 1970, the two teams met at East Carolina, with the Pirates winning 17–14. That night, the plane carrying the Herd back to Huntington, West Virginia crashed just before landing, killing all 75 on board. The two teams had only met one time since the crash, a 45–0 East Carolina win in 1978. They later played every year from 2005 to 2013, when both schools were members of the C-USA East Division.

== The buildup ==
This game was expected to be a high-scoring affair, as both teams featured "high-flying quarterbacks" who would go on to become teammates on the Jacksonville Jaguars—senior David Garrard for East Carolina, who would join the Jags in 2002, and junior Byron Leftwich for Marshall, who joined the team a year later. The two remained teammates until 2007, when Garrard beat out Leftwich for the team's starting position in the preseason and Leftwich was released, soon signing with the Atlanta Falcons.

== Game summary ==
=== First quarter ===
The start of the game could not have been much better for East Carolina or worse for Marshall. On the second play from scrimmage, Leftwich threw a screen pass deep in his own territory that bounced off the arms of intended receiver Denero Marriott into the hands of Ty Hunt, who returned the interception 12 yards for the game's first touchdown. On Marshall's second possession, a snap out of the shotgun went over Leftwich's right shoulder, and Jerome Stewart picked up the ball and ran it back 43 yards for another Pirates touchdown. Marshall appeared to be finding its rhythm on its third drive, with Leftwich completing five consecutive passes. However, that drive also ended in a turnover, with Leftwich throwing an interception to Stewart in the end zone. The quarter would end with the Pirates up 21–0, with Garrard scoring on a 9-yard run.

=== Second quarter ===
After the Pirates' Kevin Miller kicked a field goal, the Herd finally got on the board when Leftwich connected on a 35-yard touchdown pass to Darius Watts. The ensuing two-point conversion made the score 24–8. However, the Pirates' domination continued, with Leonard Henry scoring the first of his three rushing touchdowns on the night and Garrard scoring on another short run after Marshall fumbled on an attempted punt return. The half ended with East Carolina up 38–8, and several thousand fans left the game then.

=== Third quarter ===
Marshall dominated the third quarter much as East Carolina had controlled the first quarter. The comeback started early, with Ralph Street returning a Garrard interception for a touchdown. Leftwich then ran for another touchdown; after the Pirates added another Miller field goal, the Herd's Terence Tarpley returned another Garrard interception for a touchdown, a play that was seen as the game's turning point. Marshall added another touchdown on a Franklin Wallace run before the end of the quarter, making the score 41–36.

=== Fourth quarter ===
This quarter was a back-and-forth affair. A Miller field goal, increasing the Pirates' lead to 44–36, was followed by a Marshall drive ending with a Leftwich touchdown pass to Marriott, giving the Herd the chance to tie the game with a two-point conversion, which failed. Henry then ran for a second touchdown. With 1 minute 53 seconds left, Curtis Head kicked a field goal for Marshall to cut the lead to 51–45. Marshall then tried an onside kick which East Carolina recovered. The Pirates were unable to move the ball on three downs and punted. The kick went for a touchback, giving the Herd the ball on their own 20 with 50 seconds and no timeouts left.

Leftwich then led the Herd on a furious last-minute drive, connecting with three passes of 20 yards or more before finding Watts in the end zone for a touchdown with 7 seconds left. All Marshall needed to cap a historic comeback was for Head to kick the extra point—but for the seventh time that season, he missed, leaving the game tied at 51–51. The game was already the highest-scoring in bowl history even before going to overtime, with the two teams combining for 102 points, breaking the previous record of 96.

=== Overtime ===
Both teams scored rushing touchdowns in the first overtime period, with Wallace's second score of the night matched by Henry's third. In the second overtime, the Herd defense was able to hold the Pirates to a Miller field goal. When Marshall got the ball, Leftwich connected with Marriott on a pass that put them first-and-goal at the Pirates' 4-yard line. Two running plays lost a total of 4 yards. On third-and-goal, Leftwich connected with Josh Davis on what appeared to be an 8-yard touchdown pass. The drama was not over, as a penalty was called on the play. The call turned out to be against the Pirates, and the touchdown stood, capping an improbable comeback. This was the last of five games that the Pirates lost by seven points or fewer over the course of that season.

== Scoring summary ==
Scoring Play	Score
1st Quarter
ECU – Ty Hunt 12 yd interception return (Kevin Miller kick), 14:03	ECU 7–0
ECU – Jerome Steward 43 yd fumble return (Miller kick), 11:39	ECU 14–0
ECU – David Garrard 9 yd run (Miller kick), 6:48	ECU 21–0
2nd Quarter
ECU – Kevin Miller 25 yd field goal, 9:06	ECU 24–0
MRSH – Darius Watts 35 yd pass from Byron Leftwich (Trod Buggs run), 6:35	ECU 24–8
ECU – Leonard Henry 7 yd run (Miller kick), 6:00	ECU 31–8
ECU – Garrard 6 yd run (Miller kick), 4:47	ECU 38–8
3rd Quarter
MRSH – Ralph Street 25 yd interception return (Curtis Head kick), 14:37	ECU 38–15
MRSH – Leftwich 9 yd run (Head kick), 12:23	ECU 38–22
ECU – Miller 22 yd field goal, 8:34	ECU 41–22
MRSH – Terrance Tarpley 25 yd interception return (Head kick), 5:21	ECU 41–29
MRSH – Franklin Wallace 15 yd run (Head kick), 1:00	ECU 41–36
4th Quarter
ECU – Miller 32 yd field goal, 10:43	ECU 44–36
MRSH – Denero Marriot 30 yd pass from Leftwich (Leftwich pass failed), 6:15	ECU 44–42
ECU – Henry 55 yd run (Miller kick), 5:00	ECU 51–42
MRSH – Curtis Head 27 yd field goal, 1:53	ECU 51–45
MRSH – Watts 11 yd pass from Leftwich (Head kick failed), 0:07	TIED 51–51
1st Overtime
MRSH – Wallace 2 yd run (Head kick)	MRSH 58–51
ECU – Henry 25 yd run (Miller kick)	TIED 58–58
2nd Overtime
ECU – Miller 37 yd field goal	ECU 61–58
MRSH – Josh Davis 8 yd pass from Leftwich	MRSH 64–61

=== Statistics ===
Statistics	Marshall	East Carolina
First downs	36	23
Plays–yards	104–649	76–492
Rushes–yards	34–73	53–331
Passing yards	576	161
Passing: comp–att–int	41–70–2	11–23–2
Time of possession	46:49	28:11

Team	Category	Player	Statistics
Marshall	Passing	Byron Leftwich	41/70, 576 yards, 4 TD, 2 INT
Marshall	Rushing	Franklin Wallace	17 carries, 86 yards, 2 TD
Marshall	Receiving	Denero Marriott	15 receptions, 234 yards, 1 TD
East Carolina	Passing	David Garrard	11/23, 161 yards, 2 INT
East Carolina	Rushing	Leonard Henry	29 carries, 195 yards, 2 TD
East Carolina	Receiving	Derrick Collier	4 receptions, 75 yards

== Records ==
Leftwich's 576 passing yards for the game tied the bowl game record set by Ty Detmer of BYU in the 1989 Holiday Bowl (Detmer's total was set without overtime play)—these still stand as of December 2019. East Carolina earned the dubious honor of scoring the most points ever by a losing team in a bowl game. The two teams combined for 16 touchdowns and 125 points, also bowl game records. Until 2011, this game remained the highest-scoring bowl game at the end of regulation time, with the total 102 points scored in regulation. The only other bowl game, at that time, to see 102 total points scored was the 2003 Hawaii Bowl, in which Hawaii defeated Houston, 54–48 in three overtimes. These games edged out the 101 points scored in California's 52–49 win over Virginia Tech in the 2003 Insight Bowl. Washington and Baylor broke the record for most points in regulation in the 2011 Alamo Bowl, scoring 123 combined points with Baylor winning, 67–56.

== See also ==
- East Carolina–Marshall football rivalry
- Houston Oilers at Buffalo Bills, 1993 Wildcard Playoff
- The Monday Night Miracle
- 2006 Michigan State vs. Northwestern football game (a 35-point comeback in the 2006 college regular season)
- 2006 Insight Bowl, which broke the record for greatest bowl comeback
