= Tony Petersen =

American football player and coach (born 1966)

Current position
- Title: Offensive coordinator
- Team: Northern Illinois

Biographical details
- Born: October 9, 1966 (age 60); Lodi, California, U.S.

Playing career

Football
- 1984–1985: San Joaquin Delta
- 1986–1987: Marshall
- 1989: Minnesota Vikings

Baseball
- 1985–1986: San Joaquin Delta
- 1988–1989: Marshall
- Positions: Quarterback (football); Pitcher (baseball)

Coaching career (HC unless noted)

Football
- 1990: Kentucky (GA)
- 1991: Marshall (RB)
- 1992: Marshall (WR)
- 1993–1995: Marshall (QB)
- 1996: Marshall (TE)
- 1997: Marshall (QB)
- 1998: Marshall (OC/QB)
- 1999: Minnesota (QB)
- 2000–2006: Minnesota (co-OC/QB)
- 2007–2008: Iowa State (QB)
- 2009: South Dakota (AHC/WR)
- 2010–2012: Marshall (AHC/co-OC/QB)
- 2013–2015: Louisiana Tech (OC/QB)
- 2016–2018: East Carolina (OC/QB)
- 2019: Missouri (offensive analyst)
- 2020: Appalachian State (OC/QB)
- 2021: Illinois (OC/QB)
- 2022: Illinois State (OC/WR)
- 2023–2025: Illinois State (OC/QB)
- 2026–present: Northern Illinois (OC/QB)

Accomplishments and honors

Awards
- SoCon Offensive Player of the Year (1987); SoCon Athlete of the Year (1988)

Anthony Robert Petersen (born October 9, 1966) is an American college football coach and former quarterback. He currently is the offensive coordinator and quarterback coach at Northern Illinois. Most recently, he was the offensive coordinator at Illinois State University. Petersen played college football at Marshall, where he broke school records and won Southern Conference Offensive Player of the Year award as a senior in 1987.

Since 1990, Petersen has been an offensive assistant at various college football programs. During his first stint at Marshall from 1991 to 1998, Petersen coached various positions during Marshall's rise from Division I-AA to Division I-A before becoming offensive coordinator in 1998. With Petersen on staff, Marshall won the NCAA Division I-AA national championships in 1992 and 1996 and Mid-American Conference titles in 1997 and 1998. Later in his career, Petersen was offensive coordinator at Minnesota from 2000 to 2006, again at Marshall from 2010 to 2012, and Louisiana Tech from 2013 to 2015, winning six bowl games in those years.

== Early life and college career ==
Born and raised in Lodi, California, Petersen graduated from Tokay High School in Lodi in 1984. After high school, Petersen attended San Joaquin Delta College in nearby Stockton. At San Joaquin Delta, Petersen played at quarterback on the football team in 1984 and 1985. Petersen also pitched on the San Joaquin Delta baseball team and was selected by the Kansas City Royals in the 16th round of the January 1986 Major League Baseball Draft.

Petersen transferred to Marshall University in Huntington, West Virginia in 1986. He shared starting duties at quarterback on the Marshall Thundering Herd in the 1986 season and started every game in 1987. As a senior in 1987, Petersen led Marshall to its first 10-win season in program history as he threw for 4,902 yards and 35 touchdowns. In the spring of 1988, Petersen was a relief pitcher on the Marshall Thundering Herd baseball team, where he went 5–2 with three saves. Petersen won the Southern Conference Offensive Player of the Year award in football in 1987 and Southern Conference Athlete of the Year award in 1988 for his combined football and baseball performances in 1987–88. In 1989, Petersen went 4–2 with five saves. Petersen set 16 Southern Conference single-season and career records in passing and total offense, to go along with six Marshall single-season school marks. Petersen graduated from Marshall with a Bachelor of Arts in education in 1990.

== Coaching career ==
=== Kentucky graduate assistant and first stint at Marshall (1990–1998) ===
After signing as an undrafted free agent with the Minnesota Vikings in 1989, Petersen started his coaching career as a graduate assistant at Kentucky in 1990 under Bill Curry. Petersen then returned to Marshall in 1991 in the beginning of an eight-year tenure as assistant coach in various roles. During those years, Marshall qualified for the postseason eight straight times, winning NCAA Division I-AA national championships in 1992 and 1996 and Mid-American Conference titles in both 1997 and 1998 upon moving to Division I-A in 1997.

In 1991, Petersen was running backs coach. He moved to coaching wide receivers in 1992, when he helped in the development of future NFL wide receiver and three-time Super Bowl champion Troy Brown during the run to the Division I-AA title. From 1993 to 1995, Petersen was quarterbacks coach. After serving as tight ends coach in the 1996 national championship season, Petersen returned to coaching quarterbacks in 1997 and was promoted to offensive coordinator in 1998. During that time, he coached future NFL quarterbacks Chad Pennington and Byron Leftwich.

During his coaching career at Marshall, Petersen completed a Master of Science degree in health and physical education in 1995.

=== Minnesota passing game and offensive coordinator (1999–2006) ===
From 1999 to 2006, Petersen was an offensive assistant coach at Minnesota under Glen Mason. He was passing game coordinator in 1999 before serving as co-offensive coordinator and quarterbacks coach from 2000 to 2006. Petersen coached record-breaking quarterbacks Bryan Cupito and Asad Abdul-Khaliq. Minnesota also appeared in five bowls including three consecutive wins, the 2002 Music City Bowl, 2003 Sun Bowl, and 2004 Music City Bowl.

=== Iowa State and South Dakota assistant (2007–2009) ===
From 2007 to 2008, Petersen was quarterbacks coach at Iowa State under Gene Chizik, helping senior quarterback Bret Meyer set school record totals for passing yards and total offense. Then in 2009, Petersen was assistant head coach and wide receivers at South Dakota under Ed Meierkort.

=== Second stint at Marshall (2010–2012) ===
Under Doc Holliday, Petersen began his second stint as Marshall assistant coach in 2010, as assistant head coach, co-offensive coordinator, and quarterbacks coach. Petersen helped Marshall win the 2011 Beef 'O' Brady's Bowl. In 2012, Petersen coached sophomore quarterback Rakeem Cato, who would lead Division I FBS in completions per game (33.83) and become the first underclass winner of the Conference USA MVP award.

=== Louisiana Tech offensive coordinator (2013–2015) ===
In 2013, Petersen became offensive coordinator at Louisiana Tech under Skip Holtz. Louisiana Tech won only four games in 2013 but turned around to win two consecutive bowl games, the 2014 Heart of Dallas Bowl and 2015 New Orleans Bowl.

=== Later coaching career (2016–present) ===
Petersen was offensive coordinator at East Carolina under Scottie Montgomery from 2016 to 2018. However, he was not as successful there as in his previous two stops, as East Carolina won only three games per season.

In 2019, Petersen was an offensive analyst at Missouri under Barry Odom. Petersen returned to being an offensive coordinator and quarterbacks coach the following year at Appalachian State under Shawn Clark.

In 2021, Petersen was the offensive coordinator at the University of Illinois Urbana-Champaign, under coach Bret Bielema. Both in their first season, Petersen was dismissed after the season.

On January 18, 2022, Petersen was named offensive coordinator at Illinois State. Following the 2022 season, Petersen was named the quarterback coach.

Following the 2025 season, Petersen was named the offensive coordinator and quarterback coach at Northern Illinois.

== Personal life ==
Petersen is married with three children. His grandfather Ike Petersen was a running back in the NFL from 1935 to 1936.
