= Eastside High School (Gainesville, Florida) =

Public school in east Gainesville, Florida, United States

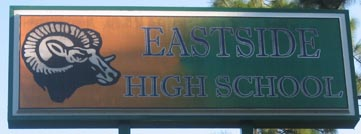

Location
- 1201 Southeast 43rd Street; Gainesville, Florida 32641-7698; United States; 29°38′24″N 82°16′07″W

Information
- Type: Public secondary
- Established: 1970
- School district: Alachua County Public Schools
- Principal: Leroy Williams
- Teaching staff: 51.00 (FTE)
- Grades: 9–12
- Enrollment: 1,231 (2023-2024)
- Student to teacher ratio: 24.14
- Campus: Suburban
- Colors: Orange and green
- Mascot: Ram
- Website: Eastside High School
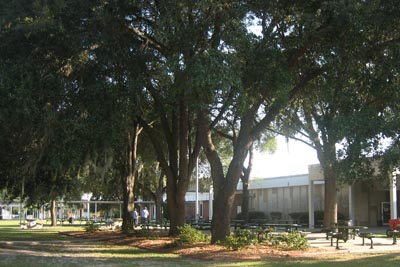
- EHS: front entrance and picnic area

Eastside High School is a public school in east Gainesville, Florida, United States. It was opened in 1970 and is managed by the Alachua County School District. Eastside harbors three magnet programs: the Institute of Culinary Arts, an International Baccalaureate (IB) program, and the medical skills services (MSS).

== Administration ==
The school has been served by the following principals: John Dukes, Mae Islar, Ron Nelson, Robert Schenck, Bill Herschleb, Sandra Hollinger, Michael Thorne, Jeff Charbonnet, Shane Andrew, and Leroy Williams.

== Academics ==
Eastside was ranked by Newsweek as the 4th best high school in the United States in 2005, and 6th in 2006, making it the top-rated public high school in the country two years in a row. In 2010 the school was ranked 17th overall, and again in High School Challenge 2011.

Eastside has hosted an International Baccalaureate program, which focuses on the classical liberal arts and sciences, since 1987.

== Awards and competitions ==
- In 2006 the boys' basketball team won the 5A State Championship, the first state championship in Eastside basketball history.
- In 2007, the Eastside team at the Florida State Spanish Conference won the state championship.
- Eastside placed first in le Congrès de la Culture Francaise en Floride (French language competition) 27 times from 1991 to 2018.
- In 2013–2014, Eastside's Florida Student Astronaut Challenge team placed first in Florida at the state competition in Cape Canaveral.

== Notable alumni ==
- Nancy Yi Fan - Author
- Gator Hoskins - NFL player
- Jarvis Johnson - YouTuber
- Kenyatta Jones - NFL player
- Marvin Pope - CFL player and coach
- Anthony Richardson - Quarterback for the Indianapolis Colts
- Craig Silverstein - First employee of Google
- Allison Wagner - Swimmer
- Harvey Ward - Mayor of Gainesville
- Andrew H. Warren - prosecutor and politician
