= East Carolina–Marshall football rivalry =

American college football rivalry

- East Carolina Pirates Marshall Thundering Herd
- First meeting: November 18, 1967; East Carolina, 29–13
- Latest meeting: September 9, 2023; Marshall, 31–13

Statistics
- Total meetings: 17
- All-time series: East Carolina leads, 11–6
- Largest victory: East Carolina, 45–0 (1978)
- Longest win streak: 3; East Carolina (2008–2010)
- Current win streak: 1; Marshall (2023–present)

Locations of East Carolina and Marshall

The East Carolina–Marshall football rivalry, referred to by some fans and media as the Honor Game or the Emotional Rivalry, is a college football rivalry game between two public universities, East Carolina University Pirates and the Marshall University Thundering Herd. The current winner is Marshall, who won 31–13 on September 9, 2023. East Carolina leads the all-time series, 11–6.

== History ==
East Carolina and Marshall have a "friendly" rivalry with one another. They are emotionally bonded by the tragic plane crash on November 14, 1970. The Thundering Herd were coming back from Greenville, North Carolina after a 17–14 loss to the Pirates when their plane crashed near Ceredo, West Virginia.

East Carolina joined Conference USA (CUSA) in 1997 as an affiliate member for football only until the 2001 season as the school moved up to full membership. When three teams from the Big East Conference moved to the ACC, the Big East looked for new members for their conference and invited five schools from CUSA to join their conference. Then CUSA added six other teams, including Marshall from the Mid-American Conference. The six new teams brought CUSA to twelve teams in which the conference can split into divisions and host a Conference USA Football Championship Game. East Carolina and Marshall were placed in the "East" division and played annually since then.

East Carolina and Marshall's most memorable game was the 2001 GMAC Bowl as they combined for a bowl-record 125 points, as Marshall overcame a 30-point deficit to beat East Carolina 64–61 in double overtime.

With East Carolina's move to the American Athletic Conference in 2014, the annual meeting with Marshall that had taken place since 2005 was discontinued. On April 3, 2014, both schools announced that the two teams will meet again for a home-and-home series in 2020 and 2021. East Carolina will host Marshall at Dowdy–Ficklen Stadium on September 5, 2020. Marshall will host the second game of the series at Joan C. Edwards Stadium on September 11, 2021. The 2020 game was not played due to the COVID-19 pandemic.

East Carolina leads the all-time record over Marshall 11–6.

Marshall's 31–13 win over the East Carolina in 2023 was the school's first ever win in Greenville. It is seen as a long-awaited sort of "finishing the job" for the Herd in the rivalry.

== Game results ==
East Carolina victories	Marshall victories

No.	Date	Location	Winner	Score
1	November 18, 1967	Huntington, WV	East Carolina	29–13
2	November 16, 1968	Greenville, NC	East Carolina	49–20
3	November 15, 1969	Huntington, WV	Marshall	38–7
4	November 14, 1970	Greenville, NC	East Carolina	17–14
5	November 18, 1978	Greenville, NC	East Carolina	45–0
6	December 19, 2001†	Mobile, AL	Marshall	64–61^{2OT}
7	November 19, 2005	Huntington, WV	East Carolina	34–29
8	November 11, 2006	Greenville, NC	East Carolina	33–20
9	November 10, 2007	Huntington, WV	Marshall	26–7
10	November 8, 2008	Greenville, NC	East Carolina	19–16^{OT}
11	October 3, 2009	Huntington, WV	East Carolina	21–17
12	October 23, 2010	Greenville, NC	East Carolina	37–10
13	November 26, 2011	Huntington, WV	Marshall	34–27^{OT}
14	November 23, 2012	Greenville, NC	East Carolina	65–59^{2OT}
15	November 29, 2013	Huntington, WV	Marshall	59–28
16	September 18, 2021	Huntington, WV	East Carolina	42–38
17	September 9, 2023	Greenville, NC	Marshall	31–13
Series: East Carolina leads 11–6
† 2001 GMAC Bowl

=== Locations ===
As of November 5, 2023

City	Hosted	Record
Huntington, WV	8 (1967–present)	Series tied; 4–4
Greenville, NC	8 (1968–present)	ECU leads; 7–1
Mobile, AL	1 (2001)	Marshall leads; 1–0

== See also ==
- List of NCAA college football rivalry games
