= Cody Slate =

American football player (born 1987)

No. 80
- Position: Tight end

Personal information
- Born: August 14, 1987 (age 39); Indianapolis, Indiana
- Listed height: 6 ft 4 in (1.93 m)
- Listed weight: 235 lb (107 kg)

Career information
- College: Marshall
- NFL draft: 2010: undrafted

Career history
- Kansas City Chiefs (2010–2011)*
- * Offseason or practice squad member only

Awards and highlights
- 2× First-team All-Conference USA (2006, 2009); All Freshman Conference USA selection (Media) (2006); Conference USA All-Freshman selection (Coaches) (2006)
- Stats at Pro Football Reference

Cody Alan Slate (born August 14, 1987) is an American former football tight end. He previously played for the Kansas City Chiefs. He played college football at Marshall University. He attended Hargrave Military Academy. Slate was considered one of the top tight ends in the nation and a top prospect at the tight end for the 2010 NFL draft, but was undrafted, after suffering from a torn ACL. Slate was projected as a legitimate All-American candidate for the 2009 season after he led the Thundering Herd in catches during the last two years and earned All Conference USA Honors.
