= Carl Fodor =

American football player (born 1963)

No. 11
- Position: Quarterback

Personal information
- Born: November 6, 1963 (age 63); Weirton, West Virginia, U.S.
- Listed height: 6 ft 2 in (1.88 m)
- Listed weight: 190 lb (86 kg)

Career information
- College: Marshall

Career history
- 1986: St. Louis Cardinals*
- 1987–1988: Calgary Stampeders
- * Offseason or practice squad member only

Career CFL statistics
- Passing comp: 56
- Passing att: 143
- Passing yards: 809
- Passing TDs: 1

Carl E. Fodor Jr. (born November 6, 1963) is an American former professional football player who was a quarterback for two seasons with the Calgary Stampeders of the Canadian Football League (CFL). He played college football for the Marshall Thundering Herd. He was also a member of the St. Louis Cardinals of the National Football League (NFL).

== Early life ==
Carl E. Fodor Jr. was born on November 6, 1963, in Weirton, West Virginia. He played high school football at Weir High School in Weirton, earning all-state honors.

== College career ==
Fodor was a three-year letterman at Marshall University for the Thundering Herd from 1983 to 1985. He completed 60 of 127 passes (47.2%) for 802 yards, four touchdowns, and eight interceptions in 1984. In 1985, he led the Thundering Herd to their first winning season since 1965 by finishing with a 6–5 record. Fodor totaled 218 completions on 411 passing attempts (53.0%) for 2,888 yards, 22 touchdowns, and 18 interceptions that year, becoming the first Marshall player to pass for at least 2,000 yards in a season. In the spring of 1985, he won the Hardman Award, given to the best amateur athlete in West Virginia. As a senior in 1985, he completed 196 of 400 passes (49.1%) for 2,438 yards, 13 touchdowns, and 19 interceptions while leading the team to a 7–3–1 record. Fodor set school career records in completions with 521, passing attempts with 1,059, passing yards with 6,655 and passing touchdowns with 39. He was inducted into the Marshall University Athletics Hall of Fame in 1991.

== Professional career ==
After going undrafted in the 1985 NFL draft, Fodor signed a one-year contract with the St. Louis Cardinals on May 28, 1986. On Jul 19, 1986, it was reported that Fodor had been released among the first cuts at training camp.

Fodor was signed by the Calgary Stampeders in April 1987. He played in nine games in 1987, completing three of 16 passes for 58 yards and one interception while also rushing four times for 27 yards and one touchdown. He played in 15 games, starting two, during the 1988 season, recording 53 completions on 127 passing attempts (41.7%) for 751 yards, one touchdown, and 11 interceptions, and 14 carries for 134 yards.
