= Gator Hoskins =

American football player (born 1991)

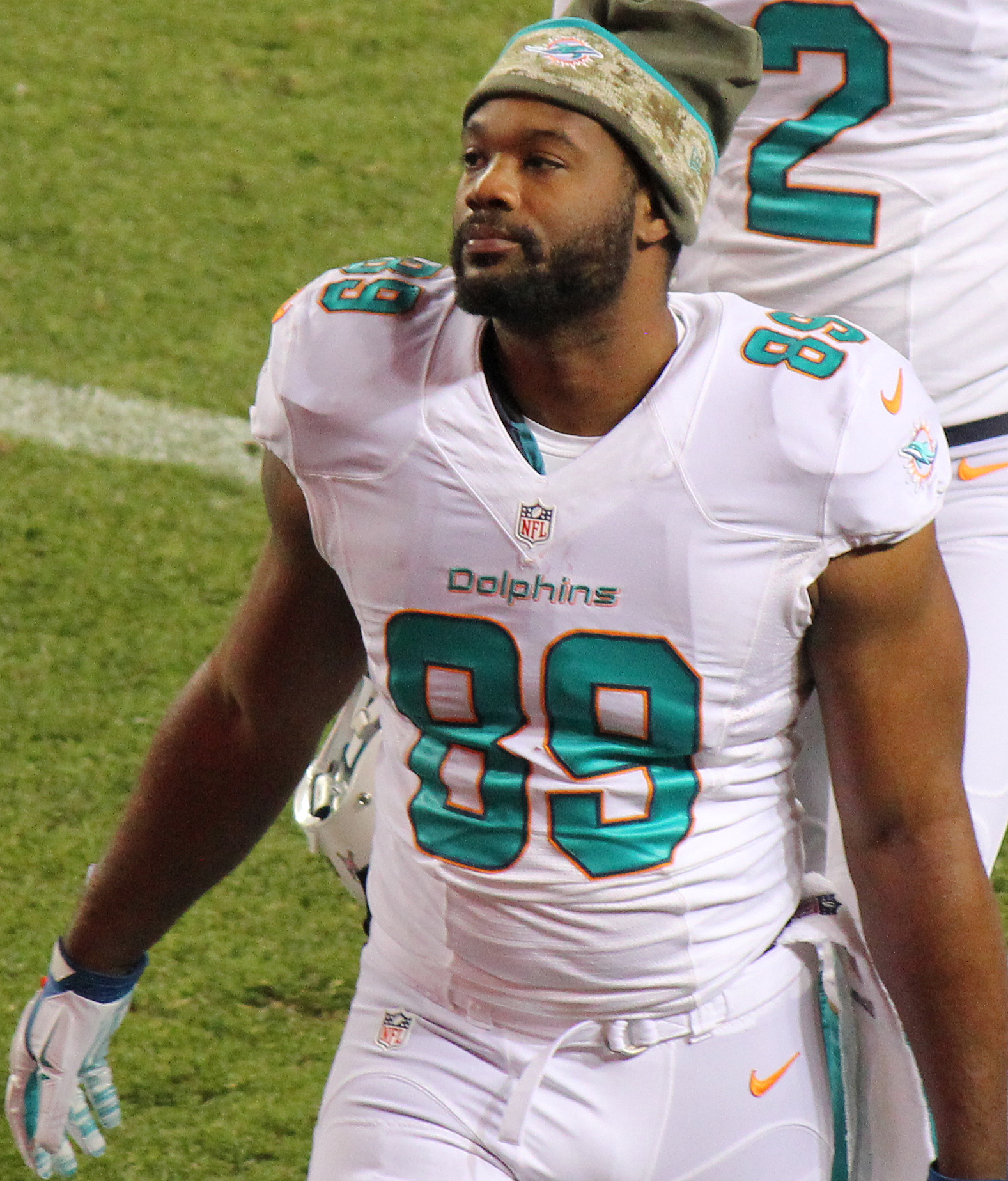
- Hoskins in 2014.

No. 89
- Position: Tight end

Personal information
- Born: December 19, 1991 (age 34); San Francisco, California, U.S.
- Listed height: 6 ft 2 in (1.88 m)
- Listed weight: 248 lb (112 kg)

Career information
- High school: Eastside (Gainesville, Florida)
- College: Marshall (2010–2013)
- NFL draft: 2014: undrafted

Career history
- Miami Dolphins (2014); Seattle Seahawks (2014)*
- * Offseason or practice squad member only

Awards and highlights
- First-team All-C-USA (2013); Second-team All-C-USA (2012)

Career NFL statistics
- Receptions: 3
- Receiving yards: 21
- Stats at Pro Football Reference

Harold "Gator" Hoskins (born December 19, 1991) is an American former professional football player who was a tight end for the Miami Dolphins and Seattle Seahawks of the National Football League (NFL). He played college football for the Marshall Thundering Herd.

== Early life and college ==
Hoskins attended Eastside High School in Gainesville, Florida.

He attended college at Marshall and had a successful career for the Thundering Herd. During his career at Marshall, he amassed 99 receptions for 1,318 yards and 28 touchdowns. In Marshall's Military Bowl victory over Maryland, he had six catches for 104 yards and two touchdowns. He was selected to the 2013 All-Conference USA first-team by league coaches and was one of eight semifinalists for the annual John Mackey Award that goes to the top tight end in the nation.

== Professional career ==
=== Miami Dolphins ===
Hoskins signed with the Miami Dolphins after going undrafted in the 2014 NFL draft. On December 16, 2014, he was waived by Miami.

=== Seattle Seahawks ===
Hoskins was signed to the Seattle Seahawks' practice squad on December 19, 2014. He was released on December 24, 2014.

== Coaching career ==
Hoskins was hired as Eastside High School’s head football coach on May 9, 2022.
