= Johnathan Goddard =

American football player (1981–2008)

Jonathan Goddard

No. 55, 50, 96, 99
- Positions: Defensive end, linebacker

Personal information
- Born: May 11, 1981; San Diego, California, U.S.
- Died: June 15, 2008 (aged 27); Clay County, Florida, U.S.

Career information
- High school: Edward H. White (Jacksonville, Florida)
- College: Marshall (2001–2004)
- NFL draft: 2005: 6th round, 206th overall pick

Career history
- Detroit Lions (2005)*; Indianapolis Colts (2005–2006); Colorado Crush (2008)
- * Offseason or practice squad member only

Awards and highlights
- Super Bowl champion (XLI); First-team All-American (2004); MAC Defensive Player of the Year (2004)

Career NFL statistics
- Games played: 1
- Total tackles: 1
- Stats at Pro Football Reference

Jonathan Bruce Goddard (May 11, 1981 – June 15, 2008) was an American professional football defensive end who played in the National Football League (NFL) and Arena Football League (AFL). He was selected by the Detroit Lions and also spent time with the Indianapolis Colts and Colorado Crush before his death in a June 2008 motorcycle accident.

== Early life ==
Goddard was born in San Diego, California and attended Edward H. White High School in Jacksonville, Florida.

== College career ==
Goddard attended Marshall University, where he played for the Thundering Herd and was an All-America selection.

His senior season statistics include 78 tackles, 16 sacks, 28 tackles for loss, 5 broken up passes, 5 forced fumbles, and 3 quarterback hurries. He was runner-up in the Bronko Nagurski Trophy standings.

== Professional career ==
=== Detroit Lions ===
Goddard was selected by the Detroit Lions in the sixth round (206th overall) of the 2005 NFL draft with a pick acquired from the New England Patriots. He was signed to a three-year contract on July 15 and assigned No. 99. However, injuries plagued him during the 2005 preseason and he was released by the team on September 3.

=== Indianapolis Colts ===
Following his release from the Lions, Goddard was signed to the practice squad by the Indianapolis Colts on September 14. He was promoted to the active roster on January 1, 2006, and made his NFL debut the same day against the Arizona Cardinals. Goddard recorded one solo tackle in the Colts' 17–13 victory. He was inactive during the team's divisional round loss to the Pittsburgh Steelers.

On August 20, 2006, Goddard suffered a foot injury in a preseason game against the Seattle Seahawks. He was placed on season-ending injured reserve three days later.

=== Colorado Crush ===
Goddard was signed by the Colorado Crush of the Arena Football League on May 6, 2008. He appeared in two games for the team, recording one assisted tackle and breaking up a pass. He was waived by the team on June 4.

== Death ==
Goddard died on June 15, 2008, from injuries suffered in a motorcycle accident in northern Florida. According to reports, Goddard's motorcycle went off the shoulder of a road at high speed and overturned at approximately 7:40 p.m. in Clay County.

== See also ==
- List of gridiron football players who died during their careers
