= Sean Doctor =

American football player (born 1966)

Profile
- Position: Running back

Personal information
- Born: July 10, 1966 (age 60)
- Listed height: 6 ft 2 in (1.88 m)
- Listed weight: 215 lb (98 kg)

Career information
- College: Marshall
- NFL draft: 1989: 6th round, 164th overall pick

Career history
- Buffalo Bills (1989)*; Raleigh–Durham Skyhawks (1991); Charlotte Rage (1993); Buffalo Destroyers (1999)
- * Offseason or practice squad member only
- Stats at ArenaFan.com

Sean P. Doctor (born July 10, 1966) is an American former football running back. He was selected by the Buffalo Bills in the sixth round of the 1989 NFL draft after playing college football at Marshall University. He was also a member of the Raleigh–Durham Skyhawks of the World League of American Football (WLAF), and the Charlotte Rage and Buffalo Destroyers of the Arena Football League (AFL).

== College career ==
Doctor played college football for the Marshall Thundering Herd. He was an All-American and first team All-Southern Conference selection as a tight end in 1987 and 1988. He helped the Thundering Herd advance to the 1987 NCAA Division I-AA Football Championship Game by recording 1,372 receiving yards as a junior, setting a school record for tight ends. Doctor was inducted into the Marshall University Athletics Hall of Fame in 2000.

== Professional career ==
Doctor was selected by the Buffalo Bills of the National Football League (NFL) in the sixth round with the 164th pick in the 1989 NFL draft. In August 1989, he was suspended by the NFL for the last game of the preseason and the first three games of the regular season for using steroids. He played for the Raleigh–Durham Skyhawks of the WLAF during the 1991 season. Doctor played for the AFL's Charlotte Rage in 1993. He played for the Buffalo Destroyers of the AFL in 1999.
