= Chase Litton =

American football player (born 1995)

No. 8
- Position: Quarterback

Personal information
- Born: October 5, 1995 (age 31); Winter Park, Florida, U.S.
- Listed height: 6 ft 5 in (1.96 m)
- Listed weight: 230 lb (104 kg)

Career information
- High school: Wharton (Tampa, Florida)
- College: Marshall (2015–2017)
- NFL draft: 2018: undrafted

Career history
- Kansas City Chiefs (2018)*; Jacksonville Jaguars (2019)*; Seattle Dragons (2020)*; Tampa Bay Vipers (2020); Ottawa Redblacks (2021)*; Winnipeg Blue Bombers (2022)*; Calgary Stampeders (2023)*
- * Offseason or practice squad member only
- Stats at Pro Football Reference

Chase Litton (born October 5, 1995) is an American former professional football quarterback. He played college football at Marshall University. He was signed by the Kansas City Chiefs as an undrafted free agent in 2018.

== Early life ==
Litton attended Wharton High School in Tampa, Florida. As a senior in 2013, he threw for nearly 2,200 yards and 13 touchdowns. He originally committed to play football for the USF Bulls, but decommitted before his senior year. He then did not sign with any school on 2014 National Signing Day and announced that he would be attending a prep school and that he would reclassify into the class of 2015. However, Litton chose not to attend prep school and instead committed to play football for the Marshall Thundering Herd as a class of 2014 recruit.

== College career ==
As a freshman in 2015, Litton was not originally the Thundering Herd's starting quarterback, but took over the starting role in the third game of the season. In 11 games, Litton threw for 2,605 yards and 23 touchdowns, a Marshall freshman record.

In 2016, as a sophomore, Litton started ten games at quarterback, missing two games due to both injury and suspension. He threw for 2,612 yards and 24 touchdowns against nine interceptions.

As a junior in 2017, Litton started all 13 of Marshall's games, completing 266 of 443 passes for 3,115 yards and 25 touchdowns. After the season, Litton declared for the 2018 NFL draft.

== Professional career ==
Pre-draft measurables
Height	Weight	Arm length	Hand span	40-yard dash	10-yard split	20-yard split	20-yard shuttle	Three-cone drill	Vertical jump	Broad jump
6 ft 5 in (1.96 m)	230 lb (104 kg)	32 1/4 in (0.82 m)	9 3/8 in (0.24 m)	4.90 s	1.66 s	2.85 s	4.53 s	7.49 s	29.5 in (0.75 m)	8 ft 10 in (2.69 m)
All values from NFL Combine

After going undrafted in the 2018 NFL draft, Litton signed with the Kansas City Chiefs as an undrafted free agent on May 5, 2018. He was waived by the Chiefs on September 1, and was re-signed to the practice squad the following day. Litton signed a reserve/future contract with the Chiefs on January 23, 2019. On August 31, Litton was waived as part of final roster cuts.

On September 2, 2019, Litton was signed to the Jacksonville Jaguars' practice squad. He was released by the Jaguars on October 21.

Litton was allocated to the Seattle Dragons before the 2020 XFL Supplemental Draft on November 22, 2019.

Litton was traded to the Tampa Bay Vipers on January 19, 2020. He was waived on March 6, 2020.

Litton signed with the Ottawa Redblacks of the CFL on March 11, 2021. He was released by the Redblacks on July 10.

On May 1, 2022 the Winnipeg Blue Bombers announced they had signed Litton. He was released by Winnipeg on June 18.

On November 22, 2022, Litton signed with the Calgary Stampeders of the Canadian Football League (CFL). He was placed on the reserve/suspended list on May 14, 2023. Litton was released by the Stampeders on September 26.
