= Micah Abraham =

American football player (born 2000)

Profile
- Position: Cornerback

Personal information
- Born: December 11, 2000 (age 25); Tampa, Florida, U.S.
- Listed height: 5 ft 10 in (1.78 m)
- Listed weight: 185 lb (84 kg)

Career information
- High school: East Lake (Tarpon Springs, Florida)
- College: Marshall (2019–2023)
- NFL draft: 2024: 6th round, 201st overall pick

Career history
- Indianapolis Colts (2024)*; Cincinnati Bengals (2024)*; St. Louis Battlehawks (2025); Denver Broncos (2025)*; Orlando Storm (2026)
- * Offseason or practice squad member only

Awards and highlights
- 2× First-team All-Sun Belt (2022, 2023); Second-team All-Conference USA (2021)
- Stats at Pro Football Reference

Micah Abraham (born December 11, 2000) is an American professional football cornerback. He played college football for the Marshall Thundering Herd and was selected by the Indianapolis Colts in the sixth round of the 2024 NFL draft.

== Early life ==
Abraham was born on December 11, 2000, in Tampa, Florida, being the youngest of three children. He attended East Lake High School in Tarpon Springs where he competed in football and track and won All-Region honors in both sports. He was ranked a three-star recruit and committed to play college football for the Marshall Thundering Herd.

== College career ==
Abraham became a starter at safety mid-season as a true freshman in 2019 and was chosen Freshman All-Conference USA. He ended the season having appeared in all 13 games, seven as a starter, and totaled 36 tackles, an interception and defended three passes. He moved to cornerback and played in 10 games with one start in 2020, recording nine tackles. He was a full-time starter for the next three seasons, only missing one start while being chosen second-team All-Conference USA in 2021 and first-team All-Sun Belt Conference in 2022 and 2023. He led the team and conference in passes defended in 2021 with 15, and then was the team leading in that category with 16 in 2022 and 19 in 2023, also being the conference leader in interceptions his last two years, with six in 2022 and four in 2023. He ended his collegiate career with 62 games played, 46 as a starter, and 150 tackles, 12 interceptions and 55 total passes defended.

== Professional career ==
Pre-draft measurables
Height	Weight	Arm length	Hand span	40-yard dash	10-yard split	20-yard split	20-yard shuttle	Three-cone drill	Vertical jump	Broad jump	Bench press
5 ft 9 3/4 in (1.77 m)	185 lb (84 kg)	30 3/4 in (0.78 m)	8 in (0.20 m)	4.44 s	1.55 s	2.58 s	4.44 s	7.12 s	31 in (0.79 m)	9 ft 7 in (2.92 m)	13 reps
All values from Pro Day

=== Indianapolis Colts ===
Abraham was selected in the sixth round (201st overall) of the 2024 NFL draft by the Indianapolis Colts. He was waived on August 27.

=== Cincinnati Bengals ===
On October 8, 2024, Abraham was signed to the Cincinnati Bengals practice squad. He signed a reserve/future contract with Cincinnati on January 7, 2025.

On May 12, 2025, Abraham was waived by the Bengals.

=== St. Louis Battlehawks ===
On May 13, 2025, Abraham signed with the St. Louis Battlehawks of the United Football League (UFL). His contract was terminated on August 15, to sign with an NFL team.

=== Denver Broncos ===
On August 15, 2025, Abraham signed with the Denver Broncos. On August 24, Abraham was waived by the Broncos.

=== Orlando Storm ===
On January 13, 2026, Abraham was selected by the Orlando Storm in the 2026 UFL Draft. He was released on May 8.

== Personal life ==
Abraham's father, Donnie, was a Pro Bowl cornerback in the NFL. His cousin Tim Jennings also played in the NFL while his brother, Devin, played college football.
