= Max Yates (American football) =

American football player (born 1979)

No. 50, 57
- Position: Linebacker

Personal information
- Born: October 30, 1979 (age 47); Newport News, Virginia, U.S.
- Listed height: 6 ft 2 in (1.88 m)
- Listed weight: 228 lb (103 kg)

Career information
- High school: Denbigh (Newport News)
- College: Marshall
- NFL draft: 2002: undrafted

Career history
- Minnesota Vikings (2002–2004); San Francisco 49ers (2004–2005)*
- * Offseason or practice squad member only

Awards and highlights
- MAC Defensive Player of the Year (2001); 2× First-team All-MAC (2000, 2001); Second-team All-MAC (1999)

Career NFL statistics
- Tackles: 2
- Stats at Pro Football Reference

Max Yates (born October 30, 1979) is an American former professional football player who was a linebacker in the National Football League (NFL). He was signed by the Minnesota Vikings as an undrafted free agent in 2002 and would play three seasons in the NFL. He played college football for the Marshall Thundering Herd.

At Marshall, Yates finished his career with 383 tackles and was named MAC Defensive Player of the Year as a senior in 2001. In 2019, he was inducted into the Marshall Athletics Hall of Fame.

Yates was signed as an undrafted free agent by the Vikings in 2002. However, Yates only appeared in one game with the Vikings during the 2004 season.

Yates has a son named Jaden, who also has played football at Marshall.
