= Josh Davis (American football) =

American football player (born 1980)

No. 82, 13
- Position: Wide receiver

Personal information
- Born: December 11, 1980 (age 45); Hickory Grove, South Carolina, U.S.
- Listed height: 6 ft 2 in (1.88 m)
- Listed weight: 188 lb (85 kg)

Career information
- High school: York (SC) Comprehensive
- College: Marshall

Career history
- Miami Dolphins (2005)*; New Orleans Saints (2005–2006)*; Minnesota Vikings (2006)*; Hamburg Sea Devils (2007); Carolina Panthers (2007)
- * Offseason or practice squad member only

Awards and highlights
- First-team All-MAC (2001); Second-team All-MAC (2004)

Josh Davis (born December 11, 1980) is an American former professional football player who was a wide receiver in the National Football League (NFL). He was signed by the Miami Dolphins in 2005. He played college football for the Marshall Thundering Herd.

Davis was also a member of the New Orleans Saints, the Minnesota Vikings and the Carolina Panthers.

== High school career ==
Before attending Marshall University, Davis was a wide receiver at York Comprehensive High School. He was the All Region football player of the year his Sophomore, Junior and Senior year. He was also the Special Teams player of the year his Sophomore, Junior and Senior year. Davis was the Offensive player of the year his senior year and was selected and awarded as one of the top 100 football players in South Carolina. In addition, he lettered in basketball his Freshman, Sophomore, Junior and Senior year. Davis lettered in track for the 100 yard meter for the state of South Carolina. He took first place in the 100-yard dash in the State Championship and second place in the 200 yard dash in the Upper State Championship. He successfully attended Fork Union Military Academy after High School and was selected and participated in the North South Shrine game. While at Fork Union Davis had an incredible career as a Wide receiver - coached by John Shuman.

== College career ==
Davis graduated from Marshall University in Huntington, WV. He was selected for Freshman football All-American Team. Davis broke the NCAA record for receptions as a freshman. He was ranked second in NCAA history for career receptions, ranked first in the Mid-American Conference for career receptions and was also ranked in the top 5 for receiving yards in the MAC. Davis made first-team All-MAC as a Freshman, Sophomore, Junior and Senior. He was selected and participated in the East-West Shrine game. Davis was the MVP for the 2004 Fort Worth Bowl game.

Davis was awarded and selected as one of the top 100 Black Legend athletes at Marshall University and awarded Offensive player of the game several times throughout his collegiate career.

== Professional career ==
Davis was a wide receiver and punt returner for the Miami Dolphins, New Orleans Saints, Minnesota Vikings, and Carolina Panthers. He was also an outstanding wide receiver in the NFL Europe for the Hamburg Sea Devils in Germany. Davis was part of the legendary team who won the World Bowl in 2007 during the last NFL Europe football season. In 2017 he was inducted into the York County Sports Hall of Fame. In 2018 he was inducted into the Marshall University Athletics Hall of Fame.
