= Jackie Hunt =

American football player (1920–1991)

No. 25
- Positions: Halfback, fullback

Personal information
- Born: February 17, 1920; Huntington, West Virginia, U.S.
- Died: June 21, 1991 (aged 71); Proctorville, Ohio, U.S.
- Listed height: 6 ft 0 in (1.83 m)
- Listed weight: 192 lb (87 kg)

Career information
- High school: Huntington
- College: Marshall (1938–1941)
- NFL draft: 1942: 13th round, 120th overall pick

Career history
- Chicago Bears (1945)

Career NFL statistics
- Rushing yards: 1
- Rushing average: 1
- Stats at Pro Football Reference
- College Football Hall of Fame

John Seva Hunt (February 17, 1920 – June 21, 1991) was an American professional football fullback/halfback. He was elected to the College Football Hall of Fame in 2004. He played with the Marshall Thundering Herd, and later played professionally with the Chicago Bears of the National Football League (NFL) in 1945.
