= Darius Watts =

American football player and coach (born 1981)

No. 18, 17
- Position: Wide receiver

Personal information
- Born: December 19, 1981 (age 44); Atlanta, Georgia, U.S.
- Listed height: 6 ft 2 in (1.88 m)
- Listed weight: 190 lb (86 kg)

Career information
- High school: Banneker (Union City, Georgia)
- College: Marshall
- NFL draft: 2004: 2nd round, 54th overall pick

Career history
- Denver Broncos (2004–2005); New York Giants (2006); Philadelphia Soul (2008)

Awards and highlights
- ArenaBowl champion (2008); Second-team All-American (2001); 2× First-team All-MAC (2001 - 2002)

Career NFL statistics
- Receptions: 33
- Receiving yards: 407
- Receiving touchdowns: 1
- Stats at Pro Football Reference

Career AFL statistics
- Receptions: 38
- Receiving yards: 376
- Receiving touchdowns: 5
- Total tackles: 3
- Stats at ArenaFan.com

Darius Orlando Watts (born December 19, 1981) is an American former professional football player who was a wide receiver in the National Football League (NFL). He was selected by the Denver Broncos in the second round of the 2004 NFL draft.

In the NFL, Watts played for the Denver Broncos and New York Giants. He sustained an injury with the New York Giants that ended his NFL career in 2007. He made a comeback in 2008 to play for the Philadelphia Soul in the Arena Football League (AFL).

== Early life ==
Watts was a four-year letterman in football at Banneker High School, as well as in basketball and track. He was first given the nickname of "Spider" from his middle school basketball coach, stating that he looked like Spiderman, and the name has stuck with him through high school, college and into the pros.

== College career ==
Watts played 48 career games at Marshall, he recorded 272 receptions for 4,031 yards (14.8 avg.) and 47 touchdowns. His 272 career receptions ranked fifth all-time in NCAA Division I-A history and were a Mid-American Conference record while only Troy Edwards of Louisiana Tech (50 in 1996–98) had more touchdown receptions in a career in NCAA Division I-A history than Watts' MAC-record 47 career touchdowns. Additionally, his 4,031 career receiving yards were topped only by Mike Barber (4,262, 1985–88) in school history.

In 2000, Watts was one of only two true freshmen to play for Marshall, starting four games to record 36 catches for 616 yards (17.1 avg.) with six touchdowns. He earned First-team All-MAC honors in 2001 as a sophomore, and was one of 11 semifinalists for the Biletnikoff Award, recording career-highs in receptions (91) and receiving yards (1,417), a 15.6 yards-per-reception average, along with an NCAA-high 18 touchdowns that ranked third on the school's single-season list. His 91 receptions ranked fourth all-time in school history for a single-season, and he recorded the most catches in a season since Marshall returned to Division I-A competition by passing the 90 receptions by Randy Moss in 1997. He tied for the second-most receptions in MAC history, his yardage total was third best and his touchdown total tied him for the second best in MAC history as well. As a junior in 2002, he was preseason All-America selection. He also earned First-team All-MAC honors with 71 receptions for 1,030 yards (14.7 avg.) and 12 touchdowns and became the MAC's All-Time touchdown receptions leader. As a senior in 2003, he Watts was a team capitan for the second consecutive season and he recorded 74 receptions for 968 yards (13.1 avg.) and 11 touchdowns.

== Professional career ==
Pre-draft measurables
Height	Weight	Arm length	Hand span
6 ft 1 3/8 in (1.86 m)	188 lb (85 kg)	32 5/8 in (0.83 m)	9 in (0.23 m)
All values from NFL Combine

=== National Football League ===
Watts was chosen in the second round (54th overall) by the Denver Broncos in the 2004 NFL draft.

As a rookie in 2004, Watts caught 31 passes for 385 yards and one touchdown for an average of 14.8 ypc. He played in all 16 games, starting two. Watts carried the ball five times for 33 yards and recorded one tackle as well. In 2004, he tied for the fifth-most receptions by a rookie in Broncos history.

He recorded only two receptions for 22 yards during his second season. He was inactive for the team's final ten games. After another inconsistent pre-season the Broncos released him on September 2, 2006. The New York Giants signed him to their practice squad and signed him to the team after they lost to the New Orleans Saints on December 24, 2006. The Giants re-signed him for the 2007 season on March 23, 2007. He was released by the Giants on July 20, 2007, due to an undisclosed injury.

=== Arena Football League ===
Watts signed with the Philadelphia Soul on Thursday January 31, 2008. As a rookie in the Arena Football League, he recorded 38 receptions for 376 yards and five touchdowns. He also won his first championship at the professional level when the Soul defeated the San Jose SaberCats 59–56 in ArenaBowl XXII.

== Coaching ==
Watts is the head football coach for the Metropolitan State University of Denver Roadrunners club football team.

== Personal ==
He is the son of Yukon and Joanna Watts. Married to La'Kea Watts.

== See also ==
- List of NCAA Division I FBS career receiving touchdowns leaders
- List of Arena Football League and National Football League players
