= Chris Parker (running back) =

American football player (born 1972)

No. 39
- Position: Running back

Personal information
- Born: December 31, 1972 (age 53); Lynchburg, Virginia, U.S.
- Listed height: 5 ft 11 in (1.80 m)
- Listed weight: 213 lb (97 kg)

Career information
- High school: Heritage (Lynchburg)
- College: Marshall (1992–1995)
- NFL draft: 1996: undrafted

Career history
- Jacksonville Jaguars (1996–1997)

Awards and highlights
- NCAA Division I-AA national champion (1992)
- Stats at Pro Football Reference

Christopher Lee Parker (born December 31, 1972) is an American former professional football running back who played one season with the Jacksonville Jaguars of the National Football League (NFL). He played college football at Marshall University.

== Early life and college ==
Christopher Lee Parker was born on December 31, 1972, in Lynchburg, Virginia. He attended Heritage High School in Lynchburg.

He lettered for the Marshall Thundering Herd from 1992 to 1995. He was part of the Marshall team that won the NCAA Division I-AA national championship in 1992. He rushed 339 times for 1,750 yards and 23 touchdowns in 1993, 321 times for 1,728 yards and 23 touchdowns in 1994, and 349 times for 1,833 yards and 18 touchdowns in 1995. He finished with career totals of 5,311 yards and 64 touchdowns. In 2000, he was inducted into the Marshall Athletics Hall of Fame for his career in football and track & field. Parker was among the candidates on the 2020 ballot for the College Football Hall of Fame.

== Professional career ==
Parker signed with the Jacksonville Jaguars on April 25, 1996, after going undrafted in the 1996 NFL draft. He was waived on August 19, and signed to the team's practice squad on September 24, 1996. He was placed on injured reserve on September 2, 1997. Parker played in one game for the Jaguars during the 1997 season, returning one kickoff for nine yards. He was released on August 10, 1998.
