= Devon Johnson =

American football player (1993–2018)

No. 47
- Position: Running back / Fullback

Personal information
- Born: July 28, 1993
- Died: November 6, 2018 (aged 25)
- Listed height: 6 ft 0 in (1.83 m)
- Listed weight: 245 lb (111 kg)

Career information
- High school: Richlands (VA)
- College: Marshall (2012–2015)
- NFL draft: 2016: undrafted

Career history
- Carolina Panthers (2016)

Awards and highlights
- First-team All-Conference USA (2014)
- Stats at Pro Football Reference

Devon Johnson (July 28, 1993 – November 6, 2018) was an American football running back and fullback. He played college football for Marshall and was signed by the Carolina Panthers as an undrafted free agent in 2016, although he did not play for the latter. Johnson died at the age of 25 on November 6, 2018.

== Early life and education ==
Johnson was born on July 28, 1993 at Welch Community hospital and spent his early years in War, WV in McDowell county and later moved and grew up in Richlands, Virginia. He attended Richlands High School, where he played high school football. As a junior, he rushed for over 1,400 yards and scored 22 touchdowns, leading the school to the Group AA Division 3 state title game. He also played linebacker on defense, and as a senior made 85 tackles, as well as ran for 1,376 yards and 23 touchdowns, which earned him the Virginia High School Coaches Association's Group AA state Offensive Player of the Year award. He was also named Defensive Player of the Year by the Bristol Herald Courier and was the Bluefield Daily Telegraph Player of the Year. In his high school career, Johnson made a total of 216 tackles and 16 sacks on defense, while recording offensively 457 rush attempts for 4,340 yards and 63 touchdowns.

Johnson announced his commitment to Marshall University in January 2011 on a football scholarship, declining an offer from the University of Virginia. As a freshman in 2012, Johnson played mainly on special teams as a tight end, making 11 tackles. On offense, he recorded three catches for 21 yards. He appeared in a total of 11 games during the season, missing only their matchup with the West Virginia Mountaineers.

Johnson changed his position to linebacker during the 2013 preseason camp, but switched back to tight end at the start of the season. Overall, as a sophomore, he appeared in all 14 games as a backup, making 12 receptions for 218 yards and scoring two touchdowns. His longest play of the season came on a 52-yard catch in a win over East Carolina. On several goal-line plays, Marshall sent in Johnson as a running back, and he scored three rushing touchdowns that way. On special teams, he recorded 13 tackles.

As a junior, Johnson played running back and fullback, and was a Doak Walker Award finalist and first-team All-Conference USA selection, following a year that he placed fifth nationally in rushing. He recorded ten games with over 100 rushing yards, a school record in major-college seasons. His top performances of the season included a game against FAU with 272 yards, a game with 199 yards against Rice, and a 198-yard game against Old Dominion. Johnson totaled 1,767 rushing yards, second all-time in Marshall history, and 17 rushing touchdowns, the largest single-season total by a school member since Ahmad Bradshaw posted 19 in 2006. Following the season, he was named the team's offensive Most Valuable Player.

As a senior, Johnson was plagued by injuries, and only ran for 593 yards in seven games, making five touchdowns.

Known for his "bullish, bruising running style and ability to run through the opposition," Johnson was nicknamed "Rockhead."

== Professional career ==
After going unselected in the 2016 NFL draft, Johnson was signed by the Carolina Panthers as an undrafted free agent. He spent the 2016 season on injured reserve and was waived by the Panthers on May 2, 2017.

== Death ==
Johnson died on November 6, 2018, at the Bluefield Regional Medical Center, at the age of 25. His cause of death was not reported. His coach at Marshall Doc Holliday released a statement that said, "I am shocked and saddened at the news of Devon Johnson's passing. Devon was a force in our program, both literally and figuratively. Whether on the field or off, his impact was immeasurable and he will be missed by so many at Marshall. Our thoughts and prayers go out to his friends and family."
