= Michael Barber (wide receiver) =

American football player (born 1967)

No. 86, 84
- Position: Wide receiver

Personal information
- Born: June 19, 1967 (age 59); Winfield, West Virginia, U.S.
- Listed height: 5 ft 10 in (1.78 m)
- Listed weight: 172 lb (78 kg)

Career information
- High school: Winfield
- College: Marshall
- NFL draft: 1989: 4th round, 112th overall pick

Career history
- San Francisco 49ers (1989); Phoenix Cardinals (1989); Cincinnati Bengals (1990–1992); Tampa Bay Buccaneers (1992)

Awards and highlights
- Super Bowl champion (XXIV); First-team All-American (1975)

Career NFL statistics
- Receptions: 38
- Receiving yards: 483
- Touchdowns: 2
- Stats at Pro Football Reference
- College Football Hall of Fame

Michael Dale Barber, Jr. (born June 19, 1967) is an American former professional football player who was a wide receiver in the National Football League (NFL). He played college football at Marshall University. He was inducted into the College Football Hall of Fame in 2005. Selected in the fourth round (pick 112) of the 1989 NFL draft by the San Francisco 49ers, he played four seasons in the NFL. He was inducted into the West Virginia Sports Hall of Fame in 2020.

== Early life ==
A multi-sport athlete at Winfield High School in West Virginia, Barber played football, basketball, and track. Barber was a quarterback, free safety, kicker, punter, and kick returner. He earned 1st Team All-State honors as a defensive back in both his junior and senior seasons. He accepted a scholarship to play football at Marshall University as a wide receiver.

== College career ==
Barber holds two Marshall University all-time records: career receiving yards (4,262) and games with 100 or more receiving yards (21). He ranks second in single-season receiving yards (1,757) and single-season receptions (106).

Barber was the 1988 I-AA National Player of the Year, selected by the American Football Coaches Association.

Barber was inducted into the College Football Hall of Fame in 2005. He was named Marshall's Athlete of the Decade (1980s) by the Herald Dispatch and was inducted into Marshall's Hall of Fame in 1994. He averaged 17.1 yards per catch over his career. In 1987, he was the NCAA statistical leader with 106 receptions, 1,757 yards, and 11 touchdowns. In both 1987 and 1988, he was a consensus I-AA 1st Team All-American. He caught at least three passes in 39 consecutive games. He threw four touchdown passes at MU on backward lateral plays.

== Professional career ==
Pre-draft measurables
Height	Weight	40-yard dash	10-yard split	20-yard split	20-yard shuttle	Vertical jump
5 ft 10 1/2 in (1.79 m)	165 lb (75 kg)	4.55 s	1.56 s	2.67 s	4.03 s	35.5 in (0.90 m)
All values from NFL Combine

Barber was selected by the San Francisco 49ers in the fourth round of the 1989 NFL draft with the 112th overall pick. This was Marshall's highest-round draft pick until Randy Moss was taken in the first round in 1998. He was one of only five rookies to make the roster and backed up all-pro receivers Jerry Rice and John Taylor.

Prior to the 1990 season, Barber signed with the Cincinnati Bengals, where he worked as the 3rd receiver, often working out of the slot position. He started two games at wide receiver, backup punt returner, and special teams.

Barber began the 1992 season on injured reserve with a separated shoulder and was released mid-season by the Bengals. Two days later he was signed by the Tampa Bay Buccaneers, where he played in one game, catching one pass for 37 yards and injuring his shoulder again.

Barber retired from football prior to the 1993 season.

== Personal life ==
Barber resides in Hurricane, West Virginia, with his wife Amy. They have four children, Brett, Abby, Chloe, and Audrey. He is a Regional Manager for Brechbuhler Scales, Inc. Barber and his wife are assistant coaches for the Hurricane High School girls' soccer team, the West Virginia AAA 2018 state champions.
