= Byron Leftwich =

American football coach and former player (born 1980)

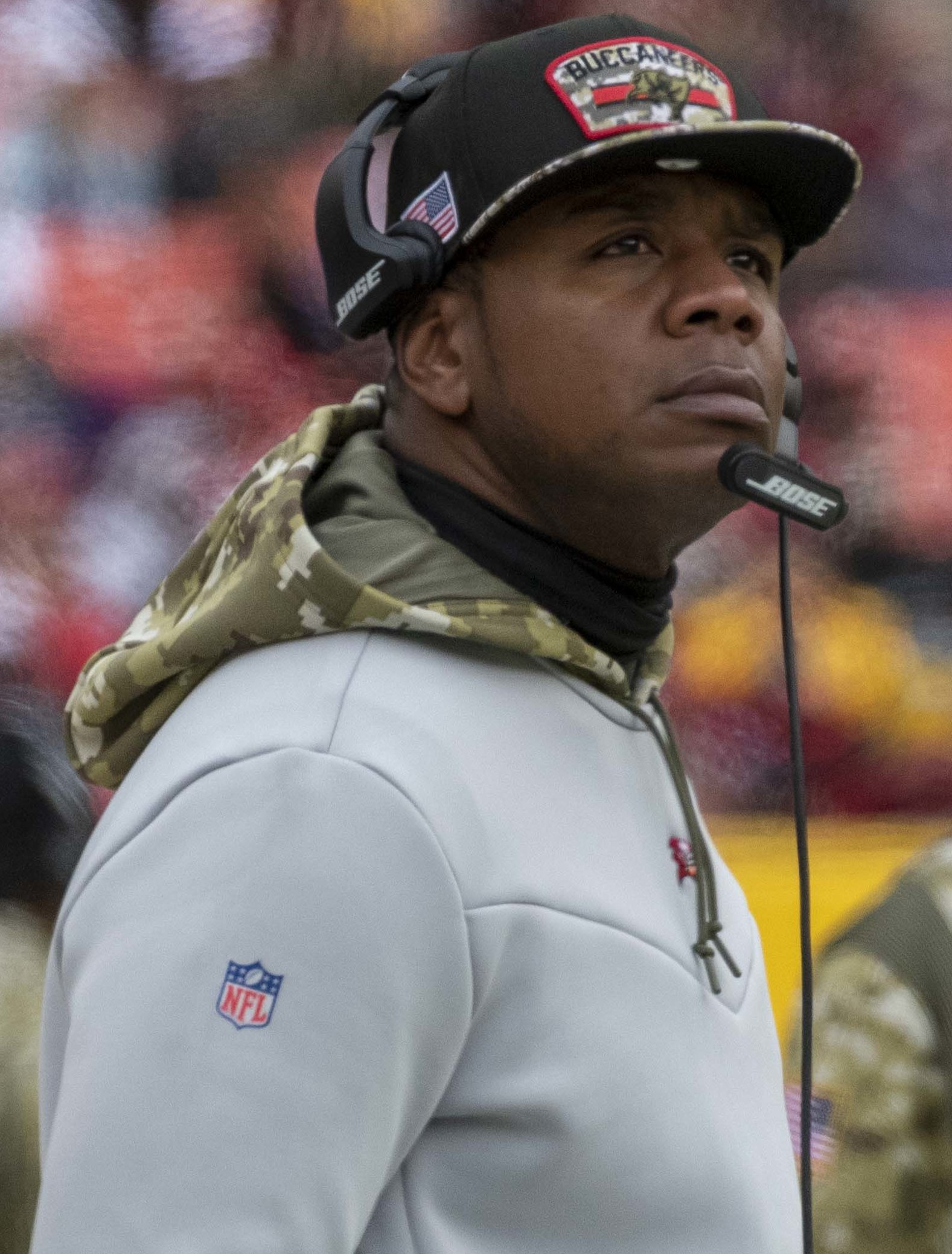
- Leftwich with the Tampa Bay Buccaneers in 2021

Colorado Buffaloes
- Title: Assistant coach

Personal information
- Born: January 14, 1980 (age 46); Washington, D.C., U.S.
- Listed height: 6 ft 5 in (1.96 m)
- Listed weight: 250 lb (113 kg)

Career information
- Position: Quarterback (No. 7, 4)
- High school: H.D. Woodson (Washington, D.C.)
- College: Marshall (1998–2002)
- NFL draft: 2003: 1st round, 7th overall pick

Career history

Playing
- Jacksonville Jaguars (2003–2006); Atlanta Falcons (2007); Pittsburgh Steelers (2008); Tampa Bay Buccaneers (2009); Pittsburgh Steelers (2010–2012)

Coaching
- Arizona Cardinals (2016) Coaching intern; Arizona Cardinals (2017–2018) Quarterbacks coach; Arizona Cardinals (2018) Interim offensive coordinator; Tampa Bay Buccaneers (2019–2022) Offensive coordinator; Colorado (2025–present) Assistant coach

Awards and highlights
- As player: Super Bowl champion (XLIII); PFWA All-Rookie Team (2003); 2× MAC Most Valuable Player (2001, 2002); 2× MAC Offensive Player of the Year (2001, 2002); 2× First-team All-MAC (2001, 2002); As coach: Super Bowl champion (LV)

Career NFL statistics
- Passing attempts: 1,605
- Passing completions: 930
- Completion percentage: 57.9%
- TD–INT: 58–42
- Passing yards: 10,532
- Passer rating: 78.9
- Rushing yards: 415
- Rushing touchdowns: 10
- Stats at Pro Football Reference
- Coaching profile at Pro Football Reference

Byron Antron Leftwich (born January 14, 1980) is an American football coach and former quarterback who played in the National Football League (NFL) for 10 seasons. He played college football for the Marshall Thundering Herd, winning MAC Most Valuable Player twice between 2001 and 2002. Leftwich was selected seventh overall in the 2003 NFL draft by the Jacksonville Jaguars, where he held a starting role during his first four seasons. He spent the remainder of his career as a backup for the Atlanta Falcons, Pittsburgh Steelers, and Tampa Bay Buccaneers and was a member of the Steelers team that won Super Bowl XLIII.

Following his retirement, Leftwich began a coaching career in 2016 under Bruce Arians with the Arizona Cardinals. He rejoined Arians as the offensive coordinator of the Buccaneers, a position he held from 2019 to 2022, and helped the team win Super Bowl LV. Leftwich was named an assistant coach for the Colorado Buffaloes in 2025.

== Early life ==
Leftwich attended Howard D. Woodson High School in Washington, DC, and was a letterman in football, basketball, and baseball. He garnered an honorable mention on The Washington Post's All-Met football team in 1997 as a senior. Leftwich was also first-team All-DCIAA East in basketball his senior year.

== College career ==
Leftwich starred at Marshall University in Huntington, West Virginia. He was the MVP of the 2000 Motor City Bowl. Leftwich gained recognition after quarterbacking a 64–61 overtime victory over East Carolina in the 2001 GMAC Bowl, in which he competed against future teammate David Garrard. He is also remembered for being carried by linemen Steve Sciullo and Steve Perretta after breaking his shin, specifically the left tibia, and returning to the game, taking Marshall down the field on multiple series as he rallied his team to a 17-point comeback against Akron in November 2002, although Marshall still lost 34–20.

Because ESPN began broadcasting Mid-American Conference (MAC) games on Tuesdays and Wednesdays—days without other football on television—in 2000, nationwide "MACtion" audiences watched Leftwich's teams. Leftwich, along with fellow Marshall alumni Chad Pennington, Randy Moss, and Doug Chapman, are credited for helping the MAC gain more national attention; Marshall is now a member of the Sun Belt Conference. In his career at Marshall, Leftwich completed 939 of 1,442 passes (65.1 percent) for 11,903 yards, 89 touchdowns and 28 interceptions. He amassed 12,090 yards of total offense on 1,632 plays, ranking second on the school's all-time list behind Pennington.

== Professional career ==
Pre-draft measurables
Height	Weight	Arm length	Hand span	40-yard dash	Wonderlic
6 ft 5 3/8 in (1.97 m)	241 lb (109 kg)	31 1/8 in (0.79 m)	9 1/4 in (0.23 m)	4.85 s	25

=== Jacksonville Jaguars ===
Publicity from MACtion games helped make the obscure Leftwich a top ten draft selection. At the 2003 NFL draft, the Minnesota Vikings and Baltimore Ravens agreed to a trade to move the Ravens into position to take him with Minnesota's seventh overall selection. However, one of the teams had second thoughts at the last minute and the Vikings missed the allotted time for their pick. As a result, the Vikings had defaulted on their selection and consequently moved back to the ninth pick. The Jaguars, who were originally slotted to be drafting eighth overall, were taken up to the seventh pick, and they used it to take Leftwich.

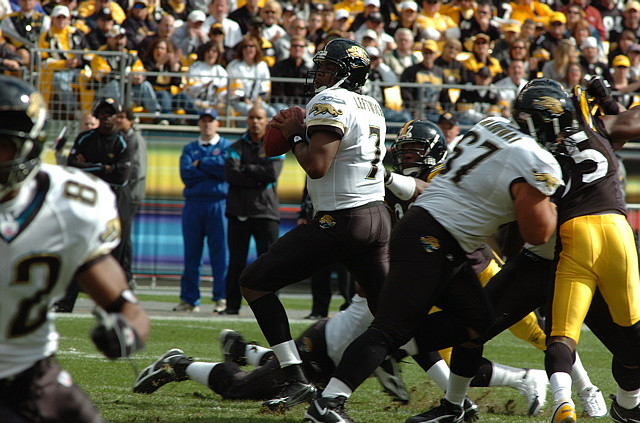
Leftwich (#7) in 2005

Leftwich took over as the Jaguars starting quarterback in game four of his rookie year after Mark Brunell was injured in the previous week's matchup against the Indianapolis Colts.

For the first 10 games of the 2005 regular season, Leftwich was developing into the quarterback the Jaguars believed he would become when they picked him in the first round. He attained a passer rating of 89.3, ninth-best in the NFL, and a 3:1 touchdown-to-interception ratio (15:5).

However, in the Week 12 game against the Arizona Cardinals, Leftwich suffered a broken ankle after being sacked by Cardinals' safety Adrian Wilson on the first play of the game. Leftwich missed the remaining five games of the regular season. He returned against the New England Patriots in the AFC Wild Card round of the playoffs. The Patriots won 28–3.

Leftwich entered his fourth NFL season as the Jaguars' starting quarterback, but without veteran wide receiver Jimmy Smith, who suddenly retired in May 2006. Leftwich led the Jaguars to victories on national television in consecutive weeks against the favored Dallas Cowboys and Pittsburgh Steelers to begin the 2006 season. Leftwich suffered an ankle injury in a Week 4 loss to the Washington Redskins. Following a Week 6 loss to the Houston Texans, Leftwich had surgery to repair the ankle, which effectively ended his season.

David Garrard replaced Leftwich for the remainder of the season. In his first seven games as Leftwich's replacement, Garrard led the Jaguars to five wins and two losses and an 8–5 record through 13 games. Garrard's and the team's success in Leftwich's absence led to speculation that the Jaguars might seek to replace Leftwich permanently with Garrard. However, the Jaguars lost the three final games of the season, preventing the team from making the playoffs, and Garrard struggled in each game. Garrard's ineffectiveness prompted Jaguars head coach Jack Del Rio to replace him with backup Quinn Gray.

In February 2007, Del Rio publicly reaffirmed his commitment to Leftwich, formally naming him as the team's starter over Garrard and Gray.

After observing Leftwich's and Garrard's performances throughout the 2007 preseason, in the week preceding the first regular season game of 2007, Del Rio named Garrard the team's starter and declared that Leftwich would be either cut or traded. The Jaguars cut Leftwich on September 1, 2007.

=== Atlanta Falcons ===
On September 17, 2007, Leftwich was flown out to Atlanta to meet with Atlanta Falcons officials, citing a possible signing with the team. On September 18, Leftwich signed a two-year deal with the Falcons with incentives attached that could make the deal worth up to $7 million.

Leftwich entered the season as a backup to starter Joey Harrington. After replacing Harrington late in Week 5, Leftwich got the start in Week 7 and played very well, before having to leave the game with an ankle sprain. He got the start again in Week 11 after returning from his injury. Harrington regained his starting position and Leftwich did not play again. On February 15, 2008, he was released by the Falcons.

=== Pittsburgh Steelers (first stint) ===
On August 10, 2008, Leftwich was signed by the Pittsburgh Steelers to a one-year deal after Pittsburgh's backup Charlie Batch was injured in a preseason game. The contract was worth $645,000 and included a $40,000 signing bonus. Leftwich started the 2008 season as the backup to quarterback Ben Roethlisberger. "I'm the guy sitting in the bullpen," he stated prior to the first game of the 2008 season. "If something were to happen, I have to go out there." Leftwich performed well throughout the season when called upon, appearing in five games. During the 2008 season, he completed 21 of 36 attempts for 303 yards and two touchdowns with no interceptions for a 104.3 passer rating, in addition to rushing for one touchdown. Leftwich earned a Super Bowl ring as the Steelers' backup when the Steelers defeated the Arizona Cardinals in Super Bowl XLIII.

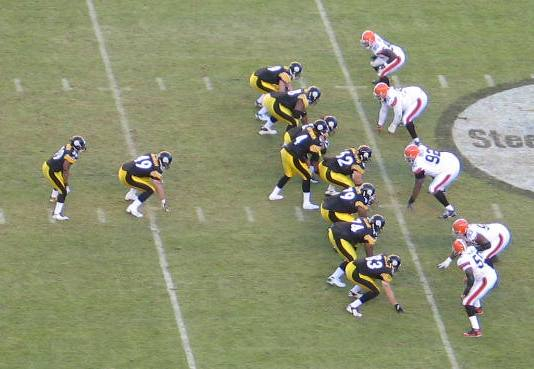
Leftwich under center as a member of the Pittsburgh Steelers

=== Tampa Bay Buccaneers ===
Leftwich agreed to terms on a two-year contract with the Tampa Bay Buccaneers on April 12, 2009. On August 29, Buccaneers head coach Raheem Morris named Leftwich the team's starter for the 2009 regular season. On September 28, Buccaneers benched Leftwich after a disappointing loss to the New York Giants and an 0–3 start to the season. Josh Johnson was named the Tampa Bay Buccaneers' new starting QB, while Leftwich moved down to third string behind Josh Freeman. After spending several games inactive due to an elbow injury, on November 24 Leftwich was placed on injured reserve, ending his 2009 season.

=== Pittsburgh Steelers (second stint) ===
Leftwich was traded to the Steelers in exchange for a 2010 seventh-round draft pick on April 20, 2010. He was expected to be the starter while Ben Roethlisberger served his four-game suspension, but suffered a knee injury during the preseason finale against the Carolina Panthers. Leftwich was cut from the Steelers on September 18, 2010, in a temporary move to make room for defensive lineman Steve McLendon, who was signed due to an injury to Casey Hampton. However, on September 19, Steelers quarterback Dennis Dixon was injured in a win over the Tennessee Titans and Leftwich was re-signed on the morning of September 20. Leftwich made one appearance during the regular season finale, in relief of Roethlisberger, once the game was out of reach for the opposing Cleveland. The final score was 41–9 and he completed 5 passes out of 7 attempts for a total of 42 yards with no touchdowns or interceptions. Leftwich was the Steelers backup quarterback for their playoff run and Super Bowl XLV loss to the Green Bay Packers.

During Week 3 of the 2011 preseason against the Atlanta Falcons, Leftwich broke his left arm after landing awkwardly while running with the ball. On September 2, he was placed on the Injured Reserve list, causing him to miss the entire season. He later re-signed with the team in April 2012.

During Week 10 of the 2012 season, Ben Roethlisberger was knocked out of the game against the Kansas City Chiefs at Heinz Field, injuring his SC joint and rib on the only sack of the game. Leftwich came into the game and completed seven of 14 passes for 73 yards, helping lead the team to a go-ahead fourth quarter field goal in a game that would eventually be tied before the Steelers finally won in overtime. Two days after the win against the Chiefs, the Steelers announced that Leftwich would be the starter in Week 11 against the Baltimore Ravens at home. He had a career-long rush of 31 yards for a touchdown in the opening drive in the loss against the Ravens. However, in the process, Leftwich broke his rib and was sidelined after the game, which would be the last one of his career.

== NFL career statistics ==
Legend
**Bold**	Career high

=== Regular season ===
Year	Team	Games			Passing								Rushing				Sacked		Fumbles	
Year	Team	GP	GS	Record	Cmp	Att	Pct	Yds	Avg	TD	Int	Rtg	Att	Yds	Avg	TD	Sck	SckY	Fum	Lost
2003	JAX	15	13	5–8	239	418	57.2	2,819	6.7	14	**16**	73.0	25	108	4.3	**2**	19	90	**11**	2
2004	JAX	14	14	8–6	**267**	**441**	60.5	**2,941**	6.7	**15**	10	82.2	**39**	**148**	3.8	**2**	**25**	**114**	5	**3**
2005	JAX	11	11	**8–3**	175	302	57.9	2,123	**7.0**	**15**	5	89.3	31	67	2.2	**2**	23	110	8	1
2006	JAX	6	6	3–3	108	183	59.0	1,159	6.3	7	5	79.0	25	41	1.6	**2**	9	48	2	1
2007	ATL	3	2	0–2	32	58	55.2	279	4.8	1	2	59.5	6	7	1.2	0	6	37	6	0
2008	PIT	5	0	–	21	36	58.3	303	8.4	2	0	**104.3**	4	7	1.8	1	2	22	0	0
2009	TB	3	3	0–3	58	107	54.2	594	5.6	4	3	71.2	6	6	1.0	0	2	0	2	0
2010	PIT	1	0	–	5	7	**71.4**	42	6.0	0	0	86.6	0	0	0.0	0	2	7	0	0
2011	PIT	0	0	–	DNP															
2012	PIT	2	1	0–1	25	53	47.2	272	5.1	0	1	54.9	1	31	**31.0**	1	3	24	1	1
Career		60	50	24–26	930	1,605	57.9	10,532	6.6	58	42	78.9	137	415	3.0	10	92	452	35	8

=== Postseason ===
Year	Team	Games			Passing								Rushing				Sacked		Fumbles	
Year	Team	GP	GS	Record	Cmp	Att	Pct	Yds	Avg	TD	Int	Rtg	Att	Yds	Avg	TD	Sck	SckY	Fum	Lost
2005	JAX	1	1	**0–1**	**18**	**31**	**58.1**	**179**	**5.8**	0	**1**	**61.1**	3	**26**	**8.7**	0	**4**	**30**	**1**	0
2008	PIT	1	0	–	0	1	0.0	0	0.0	0	0	39.6	**4**	-2	-0.5	0	0	0	0	0
Career		2	1	0–1	18	32	56.3	179	5.6	0	1	59.2	7	24	3.4	0	4	30	1	0

== Coaching career ==
=== Arizona Cardinals ===
On May 9, 2016, Leftwich was hired by the Arizona Cardinals as a coaching intern during training camp. He was given the duty to help train the Cardinals quarterbacks.

On January 27, 2017, Leftwich was hired by the Cardinals as their quarterbacks coach under head coach Bruce Arians, who had been his offensive coordinator on the Pittsburgh Steelers. Shortly after Bruce Arians retired as head coach of the Arizona Cardinals and Steve Wilks took his place.

On October 19, 2018, after the Cardinals fired offensive coordinator Mike McCoy, Leftwich was promoted to take over his role as interim offensive coordinator. On December 31, 2018, Leftwich was fired by the Cardinals, along with head coach Steve Wilks and the team finished 3–13, their worst record since 2000.

=== Tampa Bay Buccaneers ===
On January 8, 2019, Leftwich was hired by the Tampa Bay Buccaneers as their offensive coordinator, reuniting with new head coach Bruce Arians. Arians, who was returning from retirement, said in an interview with ESPN that he would not have taken the job if Leftwich wasn't available.

After the 2020 regular season, Arians stated that he had delegated the offense to Leftwich, and expressed frustration that the coordinator was not interviewed by other NFL teams for a head coaching position. At the end of that season, their second with Arians and Leftwich, the Buccaneers won Super Bowl LV. After the 2021 season, Leftwich received multiple head coaching interviews but was not hired by any organization.

On January 19, 2023, Leftwich was fired from the Buccaneers organization.

=== Colorado ===
In March 2025, Leftwich was hired as an assistant coach for the Colorado Buffaloes under head coach Deion Sanders.

== In the media ==
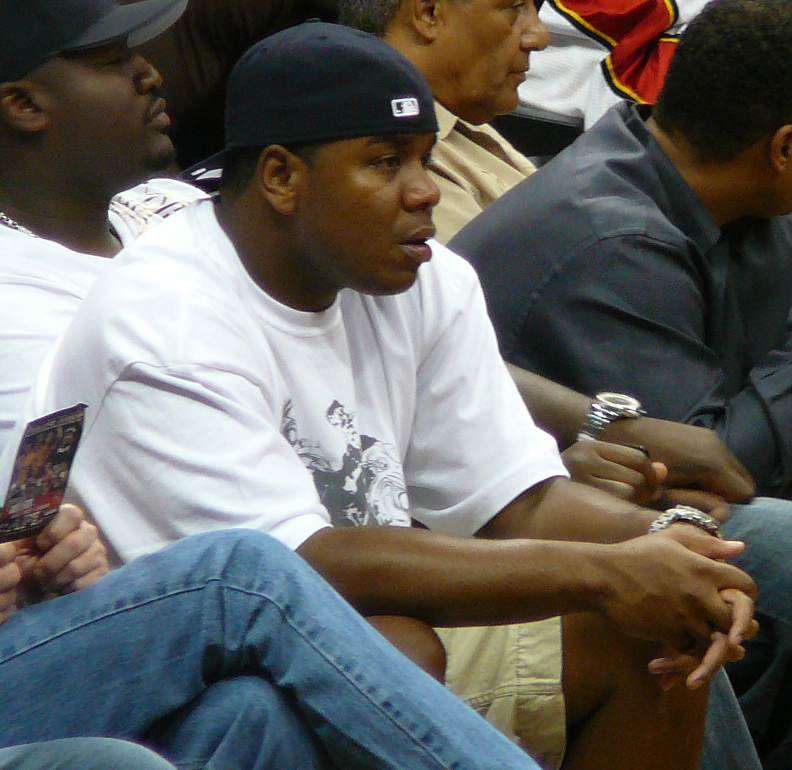
Leftwich in 2008

- In college, Leftwich starred in MTV's True Life: I'm a Heisman Trophy candidate.
- During the 2003 season, Leftwich was featured on Hey Rookie, Welcome to the NFL, an ESPN documentary profiling the life of a few select NFL first-year players.
- In 2004, Leftwich served as the grand marshal for the Pepsi 400 at Daytona International Speedway.
- Leftwich appeared on Quite Frankly with Stephen A. Smith hosted by Stephen A. Smith on ESPN in the spring of 2006.
- A 1967 Lincoln Continental owned by Leftwich was featured on an episode of the show Unique Whips on Speed Channel.
- Leftwich and fellow NFL player Michael Strahan were interviewed by NBC during coverage of the Kentucky Derby in May 2007.
- Leftwich was a frequent guest on the NFL Total Access, the flagship show of the NFL Network. On multiple appearances, host Rich Eisen has drawn comparisons between Leftwich and actor Gary Coleman.
- In the ending clip montage of the 2006 film We Are Marshall, Leftwich's famous effort of playing on a broken leg is featured.

== See also ==
- List of NCAA major college football yearly total offense leaders
