= 1999 Motor City Bowl =

BYU Cougars	Marshall Thundering Herd
(8–3)	(12–0)
Mountain West	MAC
3	21
Head coach: LaVell Edwards	Head coach: Bob Pruett
AP / Coaches / BCS; NR / 25 / NR	AP / Coaches / BCS; 11 / 11 / 12
	1	2	3	4	Total
BYU	3	0	0	0	3
Marshall	0	7	7	7	21
- Date: December 27, 1999
- Season: 1999
- Stadium: Pontiac Silverdome
- Location: Pontiac, Michigan
- MVP: RB Doug Chapman (Marshall)
- Attendance: 52,449

United States TV coverage
- Network: ESPN
- Announcers: Ron Franklin, Mike Gottfried, Adrian Karsten

The 1999 Motor City Bowl was a National Collegiate Athletic Association bowl game in which the #11 Marshall Thundering Herd of the MAC defeated the BYU Cougars of the Mountain West Conference 21–3. It was played on December 27, 1999, at the Pontiac Silverdome in Pontiac, Michigan.

== Background ==
BYU started the season with a win over Washington at home, 35–28. They were thrust into the AP poll at #25 soon after, and they responded with a win over conference opponent #23 Colorado State, which rose them to #17. But a 45–40 loss to Virginia at home dropped them out of the polls. A six game winning streak gradually made them rise back, reaching #15 before a game with Wyoming. The Cougars were beaten 31–17, and a loss the following week to Utah made them fall out of the AP poll for good, though they were still ranked in the Coaches Poll. In the first season of the Mountain West Conference, the Cougars finished as co-champions with Colorado State and Utah.

Marshall was in the third year of play in Division I-A, and they ran the table by winning all of their games for the second time in four years. They began the season unranked, but rose to #21 before their matchup with Temple. They rose to #15 by the sixth win, and rose gradually to #11 in the AP Polls before their match-up with Western Michigan in the MAC Championship Game. Marshall came back from a 20–0 halftime deficit to win 34–30, their fourth straight conference title (1 Southern, 3 Mid-American Conference). With the win, the Thundering Herd had a 49–4 record in four seasons. Marshall's offense was led by future NFL quarterback Chad Pennington and running back Doug Chapman.

The game was the third installment of the Motor City Bowl, matching the Mountain West Conference against the Mid-American Conference for the first time in its history.

== Scoring summary ==
- BYU – Owen Pochman 28 yard field goal
- Marshall – Doug Chapman 30 yard touchdown pass from Chad Pennington (Malashevich kick)
- Marshall – Chapman 87 yard touchdown run (Malashevich kick)
- Marshall – Chapman 1 yard touchdown run (Malashevich kick)

For Marshall, Chad Pennington went 17-of-28 for 207 yards and 1 touchdown and interception. Doug Chapman rushed for 133 yards on 14 carries for two touchdowns while also catching 4 passes for 40 yards and a touchdown. For BYU, neither of their three quarterbacks were effective. Kevin Feterik had the most yards with his 6-of-11 performance for 125 yards. However, he left the game midway through the third quarter. The other two quarterbacks (Charlie Peterson and Bret Engemann) combined for 10-of-18 for 2 interceptions and 95 yards. The three quarterbacks also had -44 rushing yards on 14 carries, while the rest of the runners had just 28 yards. This was Marshall's 50th win in four years.

== Statistics ==
Statistics	BYU	Marshall
First downs	12	14
Rushing yards	-16	147
Passing yards	220	207
Total yards	204	354
Sacked-yards lost	8–53	3–16
Return yards	18	90
Passing (C–A–I)	16–29–2	17–28–1
Fumbles–lost	2–2	0–0
Penalties–yards	8–81	11–84
Punts–average	5–48.3	4–42.8
Time of possession	30:31	29:29

Team	Category	Player	Statistics
BYU	Passing	Kevin Feterik	6/11, 125 yds
BYU	Rushing	Donny Atuaia	2 car, 19 yds
BYU	Receiving	Margin Hooks	4 rec, 108 yds
Marshall	Passing	Chad Pennington	17/28, 207 yds, 1 TD, 1 int
Marshall	Rushing	Doug Chapman	14 car, 133 yds, 2 TD
Marshall	Receiving	James Williams	5 rec, 95 yds

== Aftermath ==
Marshall finished #10 in the final AP Polls, their highest ever finish. Though the Thundering Herd lost five games the following year, they managed to win the MAC once again and qualify for another Motor City Bowl, which they won. BYU won their next Mountain West Conference title in 2001, which gave them the right to play in the Liberty Bowl. They did not win a bowl game until 2006.
