= 1999 Marshall Thundering Herd football team =

American college football season

1999 Marshall Thundering Herd football

MAC champion MAC East Division champion Motor City Bowl champion

MAC Championship Game, W 34–30 vs. Western Michigan

Motor City Bowl, W 21–3 vs. BYU
- Conference: Mid-American Conference
- East Division

Ranking
- Coaches: No. 10
- AP: No. 10
- Record: 13–0 (8–0 MAC)
- Head coach: Bob Pruett (4th season)
- Co-offensive coordinators: Marty Galbraith (1st season); Gunter Brewer (4th season)
- Offensive scheme: Spread
- Defensive coordinator: Tim Billings (1st season)
- Base defense: Multiple
- Home stadium: Marshall University Stadium

1999 Mid-American Conference football standings
	Conf.			Overall
Team	W		L	W		L
East Division
No. 10 Marshall x$	8	–	0	13	–	0
Miami (OH)	6	–	2	7	–	4
Akron	5	–	3	7	–	4
Ohio	5	–	3	5	–	6
Bowling Green	3	–	5	5	–	6
Kent State	2	–	6	2	–	9
Buffalo	0	–	8	0	–	11
West Division
Western Michigan x	6	–	2	7	–	5
Toledo	5	–	3	6	–	5
Northern Illinois	5	–	3	5	–	6
Eastern Michigan	4	–	4	4	–	7
Central Michigan	3	–	5	4	–	7
Ball State	0	–	8	0	–	11
Championship: Marshall 34, Western Michigan 30
$ – Conference champion; x – Division champion/co-champions; Rankings from AP Poll

The 1999 Marshall Thundering Herd football team represented Marshall University in the 1999 NCAA Division I-A football season. The Thundering Herd played their home games at Marshall University Stadium in Huntington, West Virginia, and competed in the East Division of the Mid-American Conference (MAC). The team was coached by fourth-year head coach Bob Pruett. Marshall became the second non-automatic qualifying team in the Bowl Championship Series (BCS) era to finish the year ranked in the top 10 of the AP Poll.

Marshall outscored its opponents 463–137 en route to an undefeated, 13–0, season. The season-opener at Clemson (13–10) and the MAC Championship Game vs. Western Michigan (34–30) were the only games decided by less than 12 points.

== Schedule ==
Date	Time	Opponent	Rank	Site	TV	Result	Attendance
September 4	6:00 pm	at Clemson*		Memorial Stadium; Clemson, SC	WSAZ	W 13–10	79,186
September 11	7:00 pm	Liberty*		Marshall University Stadium; Huntington, WV	WSAZ	W 63–3	26,374
September 18	7:00 pm	Bowling Green		Marshall University Stadium; Huntington, WV	FSNP	W 35–16	29,741
September 25	8:00 pm	Temple*	No. 21	Marshall University Stadium; Huntington, WV	FSNP	W 34–0	30,194
October 2	2:00 pm	at Miami (OH)	No. 17	Yager Stadium; Oxford, OH	ESPN Plus	W 32–14	30,087
October 14	8:00 pm	Toledo	No. 15	Marshall University Stadium; Huntington, WV	ESPN	W 38–13	30,203
October 23	12:00 pm	at Buffalo	No. 15	University at Buffalo Stadium; Amherst, NY	FSNP	W 59–3	13,120
October 30	4:00 pm	Northern Illinois^{†}	No. 13	Marshall University Stadium; Huntington, WV	FSN	W 41–9	30,081
November 6	2:00 pm	at Kent State	No. 13	Dix Stadium; Kent, OH	WSAZ	W 28–16	12,280
November 13	12:00 pm	at Western Michigan	No. 12	Waldo Stadium; Kalamazoo, MI		W 31–17	30,472
November 26	12:30 pm	Ohio	No. 12	Marshall University Stadium; Huntington, WV (Battle for the Bell)	FSN	W 34–3	26,053
December 3	8:00 pm	Western Michigan	No. 11	Marshall University Stadium; Huntington, WV (MAC Championship Game)	ESPN2	W 34–30	28,069
December 27	1:30 pm	vs. BYU*	No. 11	Pontiac Silverdome; Pontiac, MI (Motor City Bowl)	ESPN	W 21–3	52,449
*Non-conference game; ^{†}Homecoming; Rankings from AP Poll released prior to the game; All times are in Eastern time

== Game summaries ==
=== Clemson ===
	1	2	3	4	Total
Thundering Herd	6	0	0	7	13
Tigers	0	3	0	7	10

=== Liberty ===
	1	2	3	4	Total
Flames	0	0	3	0	3
Thundering Herd	14	21	14	14	63

=== Bowling Green ===
	1	2	3	4	Total
Falcons	3	10	3	0	16
Thundering Herd	14	14	7	0	35

=== Temple ===
	1	2	3	4	Total
Owls	0	0	0	0	0
#21 Thundering Herd	14	7	10	3	34

=== Miami (OH) ===
	1	2	3	4	Total
#17 Thundering Herd	9	10	3	10	32
RedHawks	0	0	0	14	14

=== Toledo ===
	1	2	3	4	Total
Rockets	3	10	0	0	13
#15 Thundering Herd	7	17	0	14	38

=== Buffalo ===
	1	2	3	4	Total
#15 Thundering Herd	14	24	14	7	59
Bulls	3	0	0	0	3

=== Northern Illinois ===
	1	2	3	4	Total
Huskies	0	6	0	3	9
#13 Thundering Herd	14	0	14	13	41

=== Kent State ===
	1	2	3	4	Total
#13 Thundering Herd	14	0	7	7	28
Golden Flashes	0	10	3	3	16

=== Western Michigan ===
	1	2	3	4	Total
#12 Thundering Herd	7	7	17	0	31
Broncos	3	7	0	7	17

=== Ohio ===
	1	2	3	4	Total
Bobcats	0	3	0	0	3
#12 Thundering Herd	0	13	7	14	34

=== Western Michigan–MAC Championship ===
	1	2	3	4	Total
Broncos	10	10	3	7	30
#11 Thundering Herd	0	0	20	14	34

=== BYU–Motor City Bowl ===
	1	2	3	4	Total
Cougars	3	0	0	0	3
#11 Thundering Herd	0	7	7	7	21

== Roster ==
1999 Marshall Thundering Herd football team roster
Players
Coaches
Offense

Pos.	#	Name	Class
RB	22	Doug Chapman	Sr
WR	6	John Cooper	Jr
WR	82	Chris DeShazor	So
C	58	Jeff Edwards	Fr
WR	2	Brian Greenleaf	Fr
OL	66	K. J. Greer	Fr
OT	63	Mike Guilliams	Sr
TE	44	Brad Hammon	Sr
OL	65	Paul Hardy	Fr
OL	73	Scott Harper	Jr
QB	7	Byron Leftwich	Fr
QB	10	Chad Pennington	Sr
WR	3	Nate Poole	Jr
OL	75	Steve Sciullo	Fr
C	62	Jason Starkey	Sr
WR	9	Lanier Washington	Jr
WR	83	James Williams	Sr

Defense

Pos.	#	Name	Class
DE	86	Bobby Addison	So
DL	50	Antony Beckett	Jr
DB	42	Rogers Beckett	Sr
DL	96	Ronnie Bowman	Jr
DB	19	Chris Crocker	Fr
DB	15	Yancey Satterwhite	Fr
LB	4	John Grace	Sr
DT	93	Giradie Mercer	Sr
LB	55	Andre O'Neal	Sr
DE	53	Ralph Street	Jr
DB	21	Terrance Tarpley	Fr
DB	27	Willie Tisdale	Jr
DE	85	Paul Toviessi	Jr
LB	5	Max Yates	So

Special teams

Pos.	#	Name	Class
K	8	T. C. Beaver	So
K	43	J. R. Jenkins	Jr
LS	54	Chris Massey	So
K	20	Jason Witczak	So

Head coach

- Bob Pruett

Coordinators/assistant coaches

Legend

- (C) Team captain
- (S) Suspended
- (I) Ineligible
- Injured
- Redshirt

Roster
Last update: 1999-10-12

== Team players drafted in the NFL ==
The following players were selected in the 2000 NFL draft.

Player	Position	Round	Pick	Franchise
Chad Pennington	Quarterback	1	17	New York Jets
Rogers Beckett	Defensive Back	2	43	San Diego Chargers
Doug Chapman	Running Back	3	88	Minnesota Vikings
James Williams	Wide Receiver	6	175	Seattle Seahawks

== Awards and honors ==
- Chad Pennington, Davey O'Brien Trophy finalist
- Chad Pennington, Heisman Trophy Finalist
- Chad Pennington, MAC Championship Game MVP and MAC Offensive Player of the Year
- Chad Pennington, 1st Team All-MAC
- Nate Poole, 1st Team All-MAC
- Giradie Mercer, 1st Team All-MAC
- Doug Chapman, 1st Team All-MAC
- John Grace, 1st Team All-MAC
- Rogers Beckett, 1st Team All-MAC
- James Williams, 1st Team All-MAC

== Rankings ==
Ranking movements Legend: ██ Increase in ranking ██ Decrease in ranking — = Not ranked RV = Received votes
	Week																
Poll	Pre	1	2	3	4	5	6	7	8	9	10	11	12	13	14	15	Final
AP	RV	RV	RV	RV	21	17	15	15	15	13	13	12	11	12	11	11	10
Coaches	RV		RV	25	22	17	15	16	15	13	12	11	11	12	11	11	10
BCS	Not released									14	14	—	14	13	12	12	Not released
