= 1999 MAC Championship Game =

- Conference Championship
Western Michigan Broncos	Marshall Thundering Herd
(7–4)	(11–0)
30	34
Head coach: Gary Darnell	Head coach: Bob Pruett
	AP / Coaches / BCS; 11 / 11 / 12
	1	2	3	4	Total
Western Michigan	10	10	3	7	30
Marshall	0	0	20	14	34
- Date: December 3, 1999
- Season: 1999
- Stadium: Marshall Stadium
- Location: Huntington, West Virginia
- MVP: QB Chad Pennington (Marshall)
- Favorite: Marshall by 20.5
- Attendance: 28,069

United States TV coverage
- Network: ESPN2

1999 Mid-American Conference football standings
	Conf.			Overall
Team	W		L	W		L
East Division
No. 10 Marshall x$	8	–	0	13	–	0
Miami (OH)	6	–	2	7	–	4
Akron	5	–	3	7	–	4
Ohio	5	–	3	5	–	6
Bowling Green	3	–	5	5	–	6
Kent State	2	–	6	2	–	9
Buffalo	0	–	8	0	–	11
West Division
Western Michigan x	6	–	2	7	–	5
Toledo	5	–	3	6	–	5
Northern Illinois	5	–	3	5	–	6
Eastern Michigan	4	–	4	4	–	7
Central Michigan	3	–	5	4	–	7
Ball State	0	–	8	0	–	11
Championship: Marshall 34, Western Michigan 30
$ – Conference champion; x – Division champion/co-champions; Rankings from AP Poll

The 1999 Mid-American Conference Championship Game was played on December 3, 1999, at Marshall Stadium, now known as Joan C. Edwards Stadium, in Huntington, West Virginia. The game featured the winner of each division of the Mid-American Conference. The game featured the Marshall Thundering Herd, of the East Division, and the Western Michigan Broncos, of the West Division. The Thundering Herd came back from a 23−0 third-quarter deficit to defeat the Broncos 34−30, preserving Marshall's perfect season.

== Teams ==
=== Western Michigan ===
Western Michigan entered the championship game as West Division champions, having compiled a 7–4 record, 6–2 record in MAC play. The Broncos started the season 7–2 and 6–0 in MAC play before losing the final two games of the regular season, including a 31–17 loss to Marshall on November 13.

=== Marshall ===
Marshall entered the championship game as East Division champions, having compiled an undefeated 11–0 record, 8–0 record in MAC play. Marshall has spent eleven consecutive weeks the AP Top 25 after defeating Bowling Green on September 18. They entered the MAC Championship game at No. 11 in the AP and Coaches poll.

== Game summary ==
1999 MAC Championship Game

Quarter	1	2	3	4	Total
Western Michigan	10	10	3	7	30
No. 11 Marshall	0	0	20	14	34

at Marshall University Stadium • Huntington, West Virginia

- Date: Friday, December 3, 1999
- Game time: 8:00 p.m. EST (7:00 p.m. CST)
- Game weather: Cloudy • Temperature: 59 °F (15 °C) • Wind: S 5–10 mph
- Game attendance: 28,069
- Referee: Ray Vaughn
- TV announcers (ESPN2): Rich Waltz (play-by-play), Mike Gottfried (analyst)

Game information

First quarter

- (6:47) WMU – Corey Alston 16 yard pass from Tim Lester, Brad Selent kick (Western Michigan 7–0)
- (0:37) WMU – Brad Selent 31 yard field goal (Western Michigan 10–0)

Second quarter

- (10:48) WMU – Robert Sanford 1 yard rush, Brad Selent kick (Western Michigan 17–0)
- (0:00) WMU – Brad Selent 32 yard field goal (Western Michigan 20–0)

Third quarter

- (8:34) WMU – Brad Selent 36 yard field goal (Western Michigan 23–0)
- (5:56) MRSH – Nate Poole 38 yard pass from Chad Pennington, Billy Malashevich kick (Western Michigan 23–7)
- (3:37) MRSH – Doug Chapman 24 yard rush, Chad Pennington pass failed (Western Michigan 23–13)
- (2:13) MRSH – James Williams 17 yard pass from Chad Pennington, J. R. Jenkins kick (Western Michigan 23–20)

Fourth quarter

- (12:36) MRSH – Doug Chapman 2 yard rush, J. R. Jenkins kick (Marshall 27–23)
- (7:20) WMU – Jake Moreland 4 yard pass from Tim Lester, Brad Selent kick (Western Michigan 30–27)
- (0:04) MRSH – Eric Pinkerton 1 yard pass from Chad Pennington, J. R. Jenkins kick (Marshall 34–30)

=== Statistics ===
Statistics	WMU	MRSH
First downs	30	19
Plays–yards	86–453	57–398
Rushes–yards	45–171	26–114
Passing yards	282	284
Passing: comp–att–int	27–41–2	20–31–1
Time of possession	37:11	22:49

Team	Category	Player	Statistics
Western Michigan	Passing	Tim Lester	27/41, 282 yards, 2 TD, 2 INT
Western Michigan	Rushing	Robert Sanford	32 carries, 163 yards, 1 TD
Western Michigan	Receiving	Steve Neal	8 receptions, 105 yards
Marshall	Passing	Chad Pennington	20/31, 284 yards, 3 TD, 1 INT
Marshall	Rushing	Doug Chapman	17 carries, 75 yards, 2 TD
Marshall	Receiving	James Williams	7 receptions, 94 yards, 1 TD
