= Rick Rasnick =

American football player and coach (1959–2019)

Biographical details
- Born: September 15, 1959; Los Angeles, California, U.S.
- Died: February 13, 2019 (aged 59); Torrance, California, U.S.

Playing career
- 1979–1980: San Jose State
- Position: Center

Coaching career (HC unless noted)
- 1981–1986: San Jose State (GA/OL)
- 1987–1990: San Jose State (OC)
- 1991–1994: Utah (OC)
- 1995–1999: Eastern Michigan

Head coaching record
- Overall: 20–34

Ricky Dean Rasnick (September 15, 1959 – February 13, 2019) was an American college football coach. He was the head football coach at Eastern Michigan University from 1995 to 1999. Rasnick's 1995 team was the last Eastern Michigan Eagles football team to finish with a winning record until the 2016 season, 21 years later.

== Early years ==
Rasnick was born on September 15, 1959, to Jim and Donna Rasnick. He has a younger sister, Kendahl, born in 1963, and a younger brother, Ryan, born in 1967. According to Rasnick, "Sports was always a family deal", with both brothers playing basketball, Little League baseball, and Pop Warner football while Kendahl was a cheerleader and their parents either coached or cheered from the sidelines.

Rasnick was the starting center for the San Jose State Spartans football team in 1981 and 1982.

== Coaching career ==
=== Assistant coaching ===
After graduating, Rasnick stayed at his alma mater, first working as a graduate assistant, then becoming the offensive line coach until 1986. In 1987, he became the team's offensive coordinator for four years. When head coach Claude Gilbert was fired following the 1989 season, Rasnick served as the team's interim head coach for several months during the off-season, and he was a finalist for the permanent head coach position.

When Terry Shea was hired to take over at San Jose State, Rasnick became the offensive coordinator for the Utah Utes, where he remained for four seasons, from 1991 through the end of the 1994 season. Even from the beginning of his time at Utah, Rasnick was being considered for head coaching positions; Idaho State University contacted him following the 1991 season. During his time at Utah, the team consistently featured one of the nation's top offenses, and Rasnick was considered largely responsible for this success.

=== Eastern Michigan ===
On January 3, 1995, Rasnick was interviewed by Eastern Michigan, and the following day he was hired as head coach with a five-year contract. Rasnick brought a more open, pass-oriented offense to Eastern Michigan than his predecessor, Ron Cooper had used. Rasnick's offense featured Charlie Batch as quarterback in 1995 and 1997; Batch sat out 1996 with an injury.

During his time at Eastern Michigan, Rasnick's recruiting noticeably favored junior-college transfers rather than high school seniors.

On November 16, 1999, three days after a 29–26 loss at Central Michigan, Eastern Michigan athletic director Dave Diles, Jr. held a press conference to announce that he had fired Rasnick as head coach. Diles announced that defensive coordinator Tony Lombardi would serve as the interim head coach for the final game of the season, four days later, against Northern Illinois, saying, "I felt it was best to make a change at this time to begin an immediate search for a new head football coach. After undergoing a very thorough and comprehensive assessment of our football program I'm convinced that Rick Rasnick is not the person to take our football team to a Mid-American Conference championship level."

Rasnick was the Eastern Michigan head coach for five seasons, from 1995 until 1999, compiling a record of 20–34.

== Head coaching record ==
Year	Team	Overall	Conference	Standing	Bowl/playoffs
Eastern Michigan Eagles (Mid-American Conference) (1995–1999)
1995	Eastern Michigan	6–5	5–3	5th	
1996	Eastern Michigan	3–8	3–5	T–6th	
1997	Eastern Michigan	4–7	4–5	4th (West)	
1998	Eastern Michigan	3–8	3–6	4th (West)	
1999	Eastern Michigan	4–6	4–3	4th (West)	
Eastern Michigan:		20–34	19–22		
Total:		20–34			
