= 1999 Penn State Nittany Lions football team =

American college football season

1999 Penn State Nittany Lions football

Alamo Bowl champion

Alamo Bowl, W 24–0 vs. Texas A&M
- Conference: Big Ten Conference

Ranking
- Coaches: No. 11
- AP: No. 11
- Record: 10–3 (5–3 Big Ten)
- Head coach: Joe Paterno (34th season)
- Offensive coordinator: Fran Ganter (16th season)
- Offensive scheme: Pro-style
- Defensive coordinator: Jerry Sandusky (23rd season)
- Base defense: 4–3
- Captains: Brandon Short; Kevin Thompson
- Home stadium: Beaver Stadium

1999 Big Ten Conference football standings
	Conf.			Overall
Team	W		L	W		L
No. 4 Wisconsin $	7	–	1	10	–	2
No. 7 Michigan State	6	–	2	10	–	2
No. 5 Michigan %	6	–	2	10	–	2
No. 11 Penn State	5	–	3	10	–	3
No. 18 Minnesota	5	–	3	8	–	4
No. 24 Illinois	4	–	4	8	–	4
No. 25 Purdue	4	–	4	7	–	5
Ohio State	3	–	5	6	–	6
Indiana	3	–	5	4	–	7
Northwestern	1	–	7	3	–	8
Iowa	0	–	8	1	–	10
$ – BCS representative as conference champion; % – BCS at-large representative; Rankings from AP Poll

The 1999 Penn State Nittany Lions football team represented the Pennsylvania State University as a member of the Big Ten Conference during the 1999 NCAA Division I-A football season. Led by 34th-year head coach Joe Paterno, the Nittany Lions compiled an overall record of 10–3 with a mark of 5–3 in conference play, tying for fourth place in the Big Ten. Penn State was invited to the Alamo Bowl, where the Nittany Lions defeated Texas A&M. The team played home games at Beaver Stadium in University Park, Pennsylvania.

Penn State set a new-single season attendance record of 675,503.

== Schedule ==
Date	Time	Opponent	Rank	Site	TV	Result	Attendance	Source
August 28	1:00 p.m.	No. 4 Arizona*	No. 3	Beaver Stadium; University Park, PA (Pigskin Classic, College GameDay)	ABC	W 41–7	97,168	
September 4	12:00 p.m.	Akron*	No. 2	Beaver Stadium; University Park, PA	ESPN Plus	W 70–24	95,192	
September 11	12:00 p.m.	Pittsburgh*	No. 2	Beaver Stadium; University Park, PA (rivalry)	ESPN	W 20–17	96,127	
September 18	3:30 p.m.	at No. 8 Miami (FL)*	No. 3	Miami Orange Bowl; Miami, FL	CBS	W 27–23	74,427	
September 25	12:00 p.m.	Indiana	No. 2	Beaver Stadium; University Park, PA	ESPN	W 45–24	96,416	
October 9	12:00 p.m.	at Iowa	No. 2	Kinnick Stadium; Iowa City, IA	ESPN Plus	W 31–7	66,398	
October 16	12:00 p.m.	No. 18 Ohio State	No. 2	Beaver Stadium; University Park, PA (rivalry)	ABC	W 23–10	97,007	
October 23	3:30 p.m.	at No. 16 Purdue	No. 2	Ross–Ade Stadium; West Lafayette, IN	ABC	W 31–25	68,355	
October 30	3:30 p.m.	at Illinois	No. 2	Memorial Stadium; Champaign, IL	ABC	W 27–7	50,014	
November 6	12:00 p.m.	Minnesota^{†}	No. 2	Beaver Stadium; University Park, PA (Governor's Victory Bell)	ESPN2	L 23–24	96,753	
November 13	12:00 p.m.	No. 16 Michigan	No. 6	Beaver Stadium; University Park, PA (rivalry)	ABC	L 27–31	96,840	
November 20	3:30 p.m.	at No. 15 Michigan State	No. 13	Spartan Stadium; East Lansing, MI (rivalry)	ABC	L 28–35	74,231	
December 28	7:30 p.m.	vs. No. 18 Texas A&M*	No. 13	Alamodome; San Antonio, TX (Alamo Bowl)	ESPN	W 24–0	65,380	
*Non-conference game; ^{†}Homecoming; Rankings from AP Poll released prior to the game; All times are in Eastern time

== Rankings ==
Ranking movements Legend: ██ Increase in ranking ██ Decrease in ranking ( ) = First-place votes
	Week																
Poll	Pre	1	2	3	4	5	6	7	8	9	10	11	12	13	14	15	Final
AP	3 (4)	2 (26)	2 (26)	3 (6)	2 (7)	2 (5)	2 (5)	2 (6)	2 (6)	2 (10)	2 (9)	6	13	15	14	13	11
Coaches Poll	4 (8)	4*	2 (19)	3 (7)	2 (6)	2 (5)	2 (6)	2 (6)	2 (7)	2 (16)	2 (13)	8	13	15	17	17	11
BCS	Not released									2	2	7	11	12	13	11	Not released

== Roster ==
1999 Penn State Nittany Lions football team roster
Players
Coaches
Offense

Pos.	#	Name	Class
OT	78	John Blick	Sr
FB	36	Mike Cerimele	Jr
WR	13	Sam Crenshaw	Jr
WR	20	Eddie Drummond	So
RB	34	Omar Easy	So
WR	2	Chafie Fields	Sr
TE	85	John Gilmore	So
G	71	Joe Hartings	So
WR	24	Bryant Johnson	Fr
TE	82	Brad Karson	So
OT	67	Kareem McKenzie	Jr
TE	89	Tony Stewart	Jr
QB	16	Kevin Thompson	Sr
RB	22	Kenny Watson	Jr

Defense

Pos.	#	Name	Class
LB	11	LaVar Arrington	Jr
CB	1	Bruce Branch	So
CB	6	James Boyd	Jr
DE	86	Courtney Brown	Sr
DT	99	Tim Falls	Fr
DT	95	David Fleischhauer	Sr
SS	4	Derek Fox	Sr
DE	96	Bob Jones	So
CB	10	Bhawoh Jue	Jr
DE	94	Marc Kielmeyer	Jr
CB	19	Anthony King	Sr
DE	37	Justin Kurpeikis	Jr
CB	27	David Macklin	Sr
CB	26	Bryan Scott	Fr
LB	43	Brandon Short	Sr

Special teams

Pos.	#	Name	Class
P	41	Pat Pidgeon	Sr

Head coach

- Joe Paterno

Coordinators/assistant coaches

Legend

- (C) Team captain
- (S) Suspended
- (I) Ineligible
- Injured
- Redshirt

Roster

== Awards ==
- LaVar Arrington: Chuck Bednarik Award, Dick Butkus Award

== NFL draft ==
Four Nittany Lions were drafted in the 2000 NFL draft, including the first two overall picks.

Round	Pick	Overall	Name	Position	Team
1st	1	1	Courtney Brown	Defensive end	Cleveland Browns
1st	1	2	LaVar Arrington	Linebacker	Washington Redskins
3rd	29	91	David Macklin	Cornerback	Indianapolis Colts
4th	11	105	Brandon Short	Linebacker	New York Giants
