= 1999 NCAA Division I-A football season =

American college football season

1999 NCAA Division I-A season
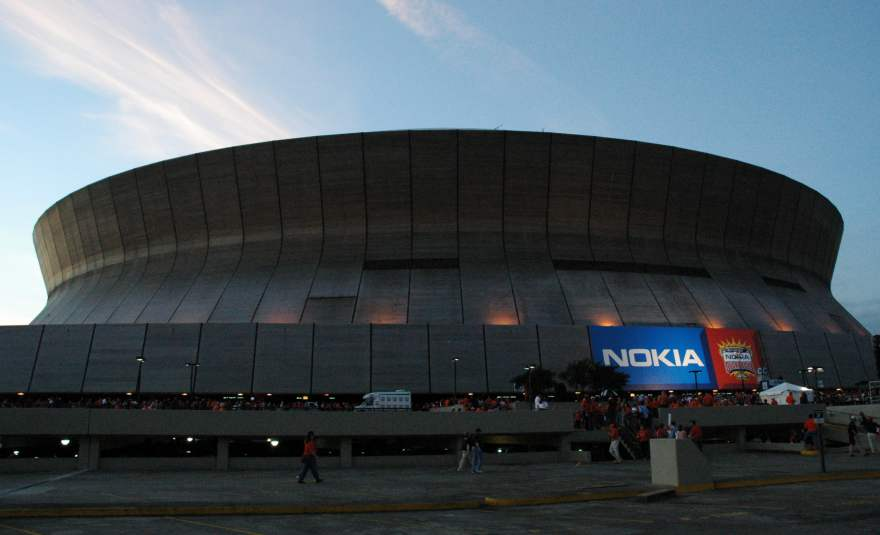
- The Superdome was the site of the national championship
- Number of teams: 114
- Preseason AP No. 1: Florida State

Postseason
- Duration: December 18, 1999 – January 4, 2000
- Bowl games: 23
- Heisman Trophy: Wisconsin running back Ron Dayne

Bowl Championship Series
- 2000 Sugar Bowl
- Site: Louisiana Superdome, New Orleans, Louisiana
- Champion(s): Florida State

Division I-A football seasons
- ← 1998 2000 →

The 1999 NCAA Division I-A football season saw Florida State named national champions, defeating Virginia Tech in the BCS Sugar Bowl.

Florida State became the first team in history to start out preseason No. 1 and remain there through the entire season. Their 12–0 season gave them 109 victories in the '90s, the most for any decade. Virginia Tech also had a remarkable season behind freshman quarterback Michael Vick, who was being touted as college football's best player.

Vick was outshone in the national championship game by Florida State wide receiver Peter Warrick. Warrick had early problems with the law, charged with a misdemeanor he sat out two games early in the season. But he scored three touchdowns in the title game, earning MVP honors.

The BCS adopted a new rule after the previous season, nicknamed the "Kansas State Rule," which stated that any team ranked in the top four in the final BCS poll is assured of an invitation to a BCS bowl game.

Many teams faced debacles. East Carolina faced Hurricane Floyd, and in that same week, faced the No. 9 Miami Hurricanes. The Pirates were down, 23–3, but scored 24 unanswered points to win the football game, 27–23.

Kansas State finished 6th in the BCS standings but again received no BCS bowl invitation, this time being passed over in favor of Michigan (ranked eighth). Kansas State's predicament demonstrated early on the problem of trying to balance historic bowl ties and creating a system which gives top bowl bids to the most deserving teams. In addition, for a second straight season, a team from outside the BCS Automatic Qualifying conferences (Marshall) went undefeated but did not receive a bid to a BCS bowl game, which illustrated the problem of BCS Non-Automatic Qualifying conference teams being shut out of the BCS bowls.

== Rule changes ==
The NCAA Rules Committee adopted the following changes for the 1999 season:

- Holding penalties committed behind the line of scrimmage will be enforced from the previous spot, modifying a 1991 rule that penalized holding (as well as illegal use of hands and clipping) committed behind the scrimmage line from the spot of the foul.
- The penalty for intentional grounding was changed from a five-yard penalty from the spot of the foul plus loss-of-down to simply a loss-of-down at the spot of the foul.
- Bandannas that are visible are considered illegal equipment.
- Offensive teams may not break a huddle with 12 or more players.
- Continuing action dead-ball fouls against both teams are disregarded, however any disqualified players must leave the game.

== Conference and program changes ==
Two teams upgraded from Division I-AA, thus increasing the number of Division I-A schools from 112 to 114.

- The Mountain West Conference was formed prior to the season by eight former members of the Western Athletic Conference.
- Arkansas State joined the Big West Conference as its seventh member after three seasons as an independent.
- Alabama–Birmingham joined the Conference USA after playing three seasons as an I-A Independent.
- Two schools made the move up to Division I-A football this season: the University at Buffalo and Middle Tennessee State University.

=== Conference changes ===
School	1998 Conference	1999 Conference
Air Force Falcons	WAC	Mountain West
Alabama–Birmingham Blazers	I-A Independent	Conference USA
Arkansas State Indians	I-A Independent	Big West
Buffalo Bulls	I-AA Independent	MAC (I-A)
BYU Cougars	WAC	Mountain West
Colorado State Rams	WAC	Mountain West
Middle Tennessee Blue Raiders	Ohio Valley (I-AA)	I-A Independent
New Mexico Lobos	WAC	Mountain West
San Diego State Aztecs	WAC	Mountain West
UNLV Rebels	WAC	Mountain West
Utah Utes	WAC	Mountain West
Wyoming Cowboys	WAC	Mountain West

=== Program changes ===
Two programs, each playing as independents, changed their names prior to the season:

- After Northeast Louisiana University changed its name to the University of Louisiana at Monroe, the Northeast Louisiana Indians became the Louisiana–Monroe Indians.
- Similarly, after the University of Southwestern Louisiana changed its name to the University of Louisiana at Lafayette, the Southwestern Louisiana Ragin' Cajuns became the Louisiana–Lafayette Ragin' Cajuns.

== Regular season ==
=== August–September ===
In the preseason AP Poll, No. 1 Florida State was followed by No. 2 Tennessee, the team which had defeated them in last year's championship game. The top five were rounded out by No. 3 Penn State, No. 4 Arizona, and No. 5 Florida.

August 28: No. 1 Florida State beat Louisiana Tech 41–7, and No. 3 Penn State blasted No. 4 Arizona by the same 41–7 score in the Pigskin Classic. The other highly ranked teams had not begun their seasons, and the next AP Poll featured No. 1 Florida State, No. 2 Penn State, No. 3 Tennessee, No. 4 Florida, and No. 5 Nebraska (who moved up from sixth place).

September 4: No. 1 Florida State was idle. No. 2 Penn State posted another blowout win, 70–24 over Akron. No. 3 Tennessee began their schedule with a 42–17 defeat of Wyoming, No. 4 Florida beat Western Michigan 55–26, and No. 5 Nebraska won 42–7 at Iowa. The top five remained the same in the next poll.

September 11: No. 1 Florida State got past No. 10 Georgia Tech by a 41–35 score. No. 2 Penn State had an even closer call, needing a late field goal and a block of a potential game-tying kick with time running out to preserve a 20–17 win over rival Pittsburgh. No. 3 Tennessee was idle. No. 4 Florida beat Central Florida 58–27, and No. 5 Nebraska shut out California 45–0. The next poll featured No. 1 Florida State, No. 2 Tennessee, and No. 3 Penn State, with Florida and Nebraska tied at No. 4.

September 18: No. 1 Florida State beat No. 20 North Carolina State 42–11. No. 2 Tennessee visited No. 4 Florida, whom they had defeated in 1998 after several frustrating losses earlier in the decade. This time, the Gators went back on top in a 23–21 squeaker. No. 3 Penn State edged past No. 8 Miami as the Nittany Lions followed a crucial fourth-down stop with a 79-yard touchdown pass to win 27–23. No. 4 Nebraska dropped out of the top five after struggling to beat Southern Mississippi 20–13. A tie-breaking safety proved to be the key play in No. 6 Michigan's 18–13 win at Syracuse, while No. 7 Texas A&M overwhelmed Tulsa 62–13. The next poll featured No. 1 Florida State, No. 2 Penn State, No. 3 Florida, No. 4 Michigan, and No. 5 Texas A&M.

September 25: No. 1 Florida State visited North Carolina for a 42–10 victory, No. 2 Penn State defeated Indiana 45–24, and No. 3 Florida won 38–10 at Kentucky. No. 4 Michigan held eventual Heisman Trophy winner Ron Dayne without a single rushing yard in the second half of the Wolverines' 21–16 victory at No. 20 Wisconsin. No. 5 Texas A&M beat Southern Mississippi 23–6, and the top five remained the same in the next poll.

=== October ===
October 2: No. 1 Florida State beat Duke 51–23. No. 2 Penn State was idle. No. 3 Florida hosted No. 21 Alabama for a thriller in which the Crimson Tide's Shaun Alexander ran for four touchdowns, including game-tying scores both at the end of regulation and in overtime. Alabama missed the extra point on the latter touchdown, but an offsides penalty gave their kicker a second chance, and this time he converted the point-after for a 40-39 finish which was Florida's first loss at home in five years. No. 4 Michigan defeated No. 11 Purdue 38–12, but No. 5 Texas A&M was upset 21–19 by Texas Tech. No. 6 Nebraska won 38–14 over Oklahoma State, and No. 8 Virginia Tech pulled off a 31–7 victory at No. 24 Virginia. The next poll featured No. 1 Florida State, No. 2 Penn State, No. 3 Michigan, No. 4 Nebraska, and No. 5 Virginia Tech.

October 9: No. 1 Florida State hosted No. 19 Miami and won 31–21, while No. 2 Penn State visited Iowa for a 31–7 victory. No. 3 Michigan fell 34–31 to No. 11 Michigan State as the Spartans' Bill Burke and Plaxico Burress set school records for passing and receiving yards. No. 4 Nebraska defeated Iowa State 49–14, and No. 5 Virginia Tech won 58–20 at Rutgers. The next poll featured No. 1 Florida State, No. 2 Penn State, No. 3 Nebraska, No. 4 Virginia Tech, and No. 5 Michigan State.

October 16: No. 1 Florida State beat Wake Forest 33–10, and No. 2 Penn State defeated No. 18 Ohio State 23–10. No. 3 Nebraska was idle. No. 4 Virginia Tech overwhelmed No. 16 Syracuse 62–0; not only did the Hokies' offense put on a show, but the defense also returned two fumbles and an interception for touchdowns. No. 5 Michigan State lost 52–28 at No. 20 Purdue. No. 6 Tennessee was idle, but nevertheless moved back into the top five: No. 1 Florida State, No. 2 Penn State, No. 3 Nebraska, No. 4 Virginia Tech, and No. 5 Tennessee.

October 23: Clemson coach Tommy Bowden nearly pulled off an upset against his father Bobby's top-ranked Florida State team, but the Seminoles escaped with a 17–14 victory. No. 2 Penn State looked ineffective on offense, but the Nittany Lions converted three turnovers into touchdowns in a 31–25 win at No. 16 Purdue which moved coach Joe Paterno into third place on the all-time wins list. No. 3 Nebraska also struggled to hold onto the ball, losing three fumbles (including a crucial one at their opponent's 2-yard line) in a 24–20 loss at No. 18 Texas. No. 4 Virginia Tech was idle. No. 5 Tennessee visited No. 10 Alabama for a 21–7 win, and idle No. 6 Florida returned to the top five: No. 1 Florida State, No. 2 Penn State, No. 3 Virginia Tech, No. 4 Tennessee, and No. 5 Florida. The first BCS standings, released after this weekend's games, had the same top four but placed Kansas State at No. 5.

October 30: No. 1 Florida State won 35–10 at Virginia, No. 2 Penn State went to Illinois for a 27–7 victory, No. 3 Virginia Tech was a 30–17 winner at Pittsburgh, No. 4 Tennessee beat South Carolina 30–7, and No. 5 Florida defeated No. 10 Georgia 30–14. The top five remained the same in the AP Poll, and Florida's big victory was sufficient to move the Gators from sixth to fourth place in the BCS standings.

=== November ===
November 6: No. 1 Florida State was idle. Unranked Minnesota completed a 4th-and-16 pass to set up a game-winning field goal and stun No. 2 Penn State 24–23; after their hot start, the Nittany Lions would lose all of their remaining regular-season games by a touchdown or less. Another thriller took place in Morgantown, where No. 3 Virginia Tech led West Virginia 19–7 with five minutes left but then allowed two Mountaineers touchdowns in quick succession. In a last-ditch effort, Michael Vick led the Hokies on a 58-yard drive resulting in a field goal which put them back on top 22–20 as time expired. No. 4 Tennessee beat No. 24 Notre Dame 38–14, No. 5 Florida escaped Vanderbilt 13–6, and No. 6 Kansas State held off Colorado 20–14. The next AP Poll featured No. 1 Florida State, No. 2 Virginia Tech, No. 3 Tennessee, No. 4 Florida, and No. 5 Kansas State; the BCS standings had Tennessee second and Virginia Tech third.

November 13: No. 1 Florida State defeated Maryland 49–10. No. 2 Virginia Tech beat No. 19 Miami 43–10. No. 3 Tennessee blew a fourth-quarter lead to Arkansas and lost 28–24, while No. 4 Florida won 20–3 at South Carolina to clinch a spot in the SEC Championship Game. No. 5 Kansas State fell 41–15 at No. 7 Nebraska. No. 9 Wisconsin breezed past Iowa 41–3 to win the Big Ten title and a spot in the Rose Bowl. The next AP Poll featured No. 1 Florida State, No. 2 Virginia Tech, No. 3 Florida, No. 4 Nebraska, and No. 5 Wisconsin, while the BCS standings had Nebraska third, Florida fourth, and Tennessee fifth.

November 20: Undefeated No. 1 Florida State visited one-loss No. 3 Florida with a spot in the national title game likely at stake, and the Seminoles prevailed 30–23. No. 2 Virginia Tech, the only other undefeated squad in the major conferences, blew out Temple 62–7. No. 4 Nebraska was idle, and No. 5 Wisconsin had already finished their schedule. The next AP Poll featured No. 1 Florida State, No. 2 Virginia Tech, No. 3 Nebraska, No. 4 Wisconsin, and No. 5 Florida; the BCS standings ranked Tennessee fourth rather than Wisconsin.

November 26: No. 1 Florida State, No. 4 Wisconsin, and No. 5 Florida had all finished their schedules. No. 2 Virginia Tech completed their undefeated season with a 38–14 defeat of No. 22 Boston College. No. 3 Nebraska blew a 27–3 fourth-quarter lead over Colorado and gave the Buffaloes a chance to win in regulation, but a missed field goal sent the game to overtime. After Colorado opened the extra period with a field goal, Eric Crouch's one-yard touchdown run gave the Cornhuskers a 33–30 win and a berth in the Big 12 Championship Game. The top five remained the same in the next AP Poll; the BCS standings had Florida fourth and Tennessee fifth.

=== December ===
December 4: In the Big 12 Championship Game, No. 3 Nebraska faced No. 12 Texas, the only team that had defeated them in the regular season. The Cornhuskers redeemed themselves this time, breezing to a 22–6 victory. The SEC Championship Game between No. 5 Florida and No. 7 Alabama had a much more surprising result. After the favored Gators scored the first touchdown, the Crimson Tide ran off 34 points in a row on their way to a 34–7 victory. The final AP Poll of the regular season featured No. 1 Florida State, No. 2 Virginia Tech, No. 3 Nebraska, No. 4 Wisconsin, and No. 5 Alabama; the final BCS standings had the same top three, Alabama fourth, and Tennessee fifth.

As the only two unbeaten teams in the major conferences, No. 1 Florida State and No. 2 Virginia Tech were the obvious choices to play for the national championship in the Sugar Bowl. No. 3 Nebraska drew No. 6 Tennessee, who earned an at-large BCS bid, in the Fiesta Bowl. The Rose Bowl featured the usual Big Ten/Pac-10 matchup between No. 4 Wisconsin and No. 22 Stanford. No. 8 Michigan, who finished second in the Big Ten, got the other at-large spot and faced No. 5 Alabama in the Orange Bowl. For the second year in a row, No. 7 Kansas State was kept out of the BCS bowls despite having just one loss; the Wildcats' opponent would be Washington in the Holiday Bowl. No. 11 Marshall, who finished undefeated but was not part of a major conference, went up against Brigham Young in the Motor City Bowl.

== Regular season top 10 matchups ==
Rankings reflect the AP Poll. Rankings for Week 9 and beyond will list BCS Rankings first and AP Poll second. Teams that failed to be a top 10 team for one poll or the other will be noted.

- Week 0
  - No. 3 Penn State defeated No. 4 Arizona, 41–7 (Beaver Stadium, University Park, Pennsylvania)
- Week 2
  - No. 1 Florida State defeated No. 10 Georgia Tech, 41–35 (Doak Campbell Stadium, Tallahassee, Florida)
- Week 3
  - No. 3 Penn State defeated No. 8 Miami, 27–23 (Miami Orange Bowl, Miami, Florida)
  - No. 4 Florida defeated No. 2 Tennessee, 23–21 (Ben Hill Griffin Stadium, Gainesville, Florida)
- Week 6
  - No. 6 Tennessee defeated No. 10 Georgia, 37–20 (Neyland Stadium, Knoxville, Tennessee)
- Week 8
  - No. 5 Tennessee defeated No. 10 Alabama, 21–7 (Bryant-Denny Stadium, Tuscaloosa, Alabama)
- Week 9
  - No. 6/5 Florida defeated No. NR/10 Georgia, 30–14 (Alltel Stadium, Jacksonville, Florida)
- Week 11
  - No. 6/7 Nebraska defeated No. 5/5 Kansas State, 41–15 (Memorial Stadium, Lincoln, Nebraska)
  - No. 9/11 Alabama defeated No. 10/8 Mississippi State, 19–7 (Bryant-Denny Stadium, Tuscaloosa, Alabama)
- Week 12
  - No. 1/1 Florida State defeated No. 4/3 Florida, 30–23 (Ben Hill Griffin Stadium, Gainesville, Florida)
- Week 14
  - No. 7/7 Alabama defeated No. 4/5 Florida, 34–7 (1999 SEC Championship Game, Georgia Dome, Atlanta, Georgia)

== Conference standings ==
1999 Atlantic Coast Conference football standings
	Conf.			Overall
Team	W		L	W		L
No. 1 Florida State $#	8	–	0	12	–	0
No. 17 Georgia Tech	5	–	3	8	–	4
Virginia	5	–	3	7	–	5
Clemson	5	–	3	6	–	6
Wake Forest	3	–	5	7	–	5
NC State	3	–	5	6	–	6
Duke	3	–	5	3	–	8
Maryland	2	–	6	5	–	6
North Carolina	2	–	6	3	–	8
# – BCS National Champion; $ – BCS representative as conference champion; Rankings from AP Poll

1999 Big 12 Conference football standings
	Conf.			Overall
Team	W		L	W		L
North Division
No. 3 Nebraska xy$	7	–	1	12	–	1
No. 6 Kansas State x	7	–	1	11	–	1
Colorado	5	–	3	7	–	5
Kansas	3	–	5	5	–	7
Iowa State	1	–	7	4	–	7
Missouri	1	–	7	4	–	7
South Division
No. 21 Texas xy	6	–	2	9	–	5
Oklahoma	5	–	3	7	–	5
Texas Tech	5	–	3	6	–	5
No. 23 Texas A&M	5	–	3	8	–	4
Oklahoma State	3	–	5	5	–	6
Baylor	0	–	8	1	–	10
Championship: Nebraska 22, Texas 6
$ – BCS representative as conference champion; x – Division champion/co-champions; y – Championship game participant; Rankings from AP Poll

1999 Big East Conference football standings
	Conf.			Overall
Team	W		L	W		L
No. 2 Virginia Tech $	7	–	0	11	–	1
No. 15 Miami (FL)	6	–	1	9	–	4
Boston College	4	–	3	8	–	4
Syracuse	3	–	4	7	–	5
West Virginia	3	–	4	4	–	7
Pittsburgh	2	–	5	5	–	6
Temple	2	–	5	2	–	9
Rutgers	1	–	6	1	–	10
$ – BCS representative as conference champion; Rankings from AP Poll

1999 Big Ten Conference football standings
	Conf.			Overall
Team	W		L	W		L
No. 4 Wisconsin $	7	–	1	10	–	2
No. 7 Michigan State	6	–	2	10	–	2
No. 5 Michigan %	6	–	2	10	–	2
No. 11 Penn State	5	–	3	10	–	3
No. 18 Minnesota	5	–	3	8	–	4
No. 24 Illinois	4	–	4	8	–	4
No. 25 Purdue	4	–	4	7	–	5
Ohio State	3	–	5	6	–	6
Indiana	3	–	5	4	–	7
Northwestern	1	–	7	3	–	8
Iowa	0	–	8	1	–	10
$ – BCS representative as conference champion; % – BCS at-large representative; Rankings from AP Poll

1999 Big West Conference football standings
	Conf.			Overall
Team	W		L	W		L
Boise State $	5	–	1	10	–	3
Idaho	4	–	2	7	–	4
New Mexico State	3	–	2	6	–	5
Utah State	3	–	3	4	–	7
Arkansas State	2	–	3	4	–	7
Nevada	2	–	4	3	–	8
North Texas	1	–	5	2	–	9
$ – Conference champion

1999 Conference USA football standings
	Conf.			Overall
Team	W		L	W		L
No. 14 Southern Miss $	6	–	0	9	–	3
East Carolina	4	–	2	9	–	3
Louisville	4	–	2	7	–	5
UAB	4	–	2	5	–	6
Memphis	4	–	2	5	–	6
Houston	3	–	3	7	–	4
Army	1	–	5	3	–	8
Tulane	1	–	5	3	–	8
Cincinnati	0	–	6	3	–	8
$ – Conference champion; Rankings from AP Poll

1999 Mid-American Conference football standings
	Conf.			Overall
Team	W		L	W		L
East Division
No. 10 Marshall x$	8	–	0	13	–	0
Miami (OH)	6	–	2	7	–	4
Akron	5	–	3	7	–	4
Ohio	5	–	3	5	–	6
Bowling Green	3	–	5	5	–	6
Kent State	2	–	6	2	–	9
Buffalo	0	–	8	0	–	11
West Division
Western Michigan x	6	–	2	7	–	5
Toledo	5	–	3	6	–	5
Northern Illinois	5	–	3	5	–	6
Eastern Michigan	4	–	4	4	–	7
Central Michigan	3	–	5	4	–	7
Ball State	0	–	8	0	–	11
Championship: Marshall 34, Western Michigan 30
$ – Conference champion; x – Division champion/co-champions; Rankings from AP Poll

1999 Mountain West Conference football standings
	Conf.			Overall
Team	W		L	W		L
Utah +	5	–	2	9	–	3
BYU +	5	–	2	8	–	4
Colorado State +	5	–	2	8	–	4
Wyoming	4	–	3	7	–	4
San Diego State	3	–	4	5	–	6
New Mexico	3	–	4	4	–	7
Air Force	2	–	5	6	–	5
UNLV	1	–	6	3	–	8
+ – Conference co-champions; Rankings from AP Poll

1999 Pacific-10 Conference football standings
	Conf.			Overall
Team	W		L	W		L
Stanford $	7	–	1	8	–	4
No. 19 Oregon	6	–	2	9	–	3
Washington	6	–	2	7	–	5
Arizona State	5	–	3	6	–	6
Oregon State	4	–	4	7	–	5
Arizona	3	–	5	6	–	6
USC	3	–	5	6	–	6
California	3	–	5	4	–	7
UCLA	2	–	6	4	–	7
Washington State	1	–	7	3	–	9
$ – BCS representative as conference champion; Cal later vacated 4 wins (3 in conference) due to NCAA sanctions.; Rankings from AP Poll

1999 Southeastern Conference football standings
	Conf.			Overall
Team	W		L	W		L
Eastern Division
No. 12 Florida x	7	–	1	9	–	4
No. 9 Tennessee	6	–	2	9	–	3
No. 16 Georgia	5	–	3	8	–	4
Kentucky	4	–	4	6	–	6
Vanderbilt	2	–	6	5	–	6
South Carolina	0	–	8	0	–	11
Western Division
No. 8 Alabama x$	7	–	1	10	–	3
No. 13 Mississippi State	6	–	2	10	–	2
No. 22 Ole Miss	4	–	4	8	–	4
No. 17 Arkansas	4	–	4	8	–	4
Auburn	2	–	6	5	–	6
LSU	1	–	7	3	–	8
Championship: Alabama 34, Florida 7
$ – BCS representative as conference champion; x – Division champion/co-champions; Rankings from AP Poll

1999 Western Athletic Conference football standings
	Conf.			Overall
Team	W		L	W		L
Hawaii +	5	–	2	9	–	4
TCU +	5	–	2	8	–	4
Fresno State +	5	–	2	8	–	5
Rice	4	–	3	5	–	6
SMU	3	–	3	4	–	6
UTEP	3	–	4	5	–	7
San Jose State	1	–	5	3	–	7
Tulsa	1	–	6	2	–	9
+ – Conference co-champions

1999 NCAA Division I-A independents football records
	Conf.			Overall
Team	W		L	W		L
Louisiana Tech		–		8	–	3
Louisiana–Monroe		–		5	–	6
Notre Dame		–		5	–	7
Navy		–		5	–	7
UCF		–		4	–	7
Middle Tennessee		–		3	–	8
Louisiana–Lafayette		–		2	–	9
Rankings from AP Poll

== I-AA team wins over I-A teams ==
Italics denotes I-AA teams.

Date	Visiting team	Home team	Site	Result	Attendance	Ref.
September 2	No. 20 (I-AA) Western Illinois	Northern Illinois	Huskie Stadium • DeKalb, Illinois	27–21	17,930	
September 11	No. 9 (I-AA) Northern Iowa	Ohio	Peden Stadium • Athens, Ohio	36–21	21,275	
September 11	No. 10 (I-AA) Troy State	Cincinnati	Nippert Stadium • Cincinnati, Ohio	31–24	16,091	
September 18	Buffalo	Connecticut	Memorial Stadium • Storrs, Connecticut	0–23	12,547	
October 30	No. 12 (I-AA) Furman	North Carolina	Kenan Memorial Stadium • Chapel Hill, North Carolina	28–3	33,000	
November 6	No. 10 (I-AA) Hofstra	Buffalo	University at Buffalo Stadium • Amherst, New York	20–13	8,699	
^{#}Rankings from AP Poll released prior to game.

== Rankings ==
The top 25 from the AP and USA Today/ESPN Coaches Polls.

=== Pre-season polls ===
AP
Ranking	Team
1	Florida State (48)
2	Tennessee (15)
3	Penn State (4)
4	Arizona (1)
5	Florida (1)
6	Nebraska
7	Texas A&M
8	Michigan
9	Ohio State
10	Wisconsin
11	Georgia Tech
12	Miami (FL)
13	Virginia Tech (1)
14	Georgia
15	Colorado
16	UCLA
17	Texas
18	Notre Dame
19	USC
20т	Alabama
20т	Kansas State
22	Arkansas
23	Purdue
24	Virginia
25	Arizona State

USA Today/ESPN Coaches
Ranking	Team
1	Florida State (36)
2	Tennessee (13)
3	Arizona (2)
4	Penn State (8)
5	Florida
6	Nebraska
7	Michigan
8	Texas A&M
9	Ohio State
10	Wisconsin
11	Georgia Tech
12	Miami (FL)
13	Georgia
14	Virginia Tech
15	UCLA
16	Texas
17	Colorado
18	Notre Dame
19	Kansas State
20	Alabama
21	USC
22	Arkansas
23	Purdue
24	Virginia
25	Arizona State

=== BCS final rankings ===
Rank	Team	Conference and standing	Bowl game
1	Florida State	ACC champions	Sugar Bowl (BCS National Championship)
2	Virginia Tech	Big East champions	Sugar Bowl (BCS National Championship)
3	Nebraska	Big 12 Champions	Fiesta Bowl
4	Alabama	SEC Champions	Orange Bowl
5	Tennessee	SEC Eastern Division second place	Fiesta Bowl
6	Kansas State	Co-Big 12 North Division Champions	Holiday Bowl
7	Wisconsin	Big Ten Champions	Rose Bowl
8	Michigan	Big Ten second place (tie)	Orange Bowl
9	Michigan State	Big Ten second place (tie)	Citrus Bowl
10	Florida	SEC Eastern Division champions	Citrus Bowl
11	Penn State	Big Ten fourth place (tie)	Alamo Bowl
12	Marshall	MAC Champions	Motor City Bowl
13	Minnesota	Big Ten fourth place (tie)	Sun Bowl
14	Texas A&M	Big 12 South Division second place (tie)	Alamo Bowl
15	Texas	Big 12 South Division Champions	Cotton Bowl

=== Final polls ===
Rank	Associated Press	Coaches' Poll
1	Florida State (70)	Florida State (59)
2	Virginia Tech	Nebraska
3	Nebraska	Virginia Tech
4	Wisconsin	Wisconsin
5	Michigan	Michigan
6	Kansas State	Kansas State
7	Michigan State	Michigan State
8	Alabama	Alabama
9	Tennessee	Tennessee
10	Marshall	Marshall
11	Penn State	Penn State
12	Florida	Mississippi State
13	Mississippi State	Southern Miss
14	Southern Miss	Florida
15	Miami (FL)	Miami (FL)
16	Georgia	Georgia
17	Arkansas	Minnesota
18	Minnesota	Oregon
19	Oregon	Arkansas
20	Georgia Tech	Texas A&M
21	Texas	Georgia Tech
22	Ole Miss	Ole Miss
23	Texas A&M	Texas
24	Illinois	Stanford
25	Purdue	Illinois

== Bowl games ==
Rankings from final regular season AP poll

=== BCS bowls ===
- Sugar Bowl: No. 1 Florida State (BCS No. 1, ACC Champ) 46, No. 2 Virginia Tech (BCS No. 2, Big East Champ) 29
- Orange Bowl: No. 8 Michigan (At Large) 35, No. 5 Alabama (SEC Champ) 34 (OT)
- Rose Bowl: No. 4 Wisconsin (Big 10 Champ) 17, No. 22 Stanford (Pac-10 Champ) 9
- Fiesta Bowl: No. 3 Nebraska (Big 12 Champ) 31, No. 6 Tennessee (At Large) 21

=== Other New Years Day bowls ===
- Cotton Bowl Classic: No. 24 Arkansas 27, No. 12 Texas (Big 12 Runner Up) 6
- Florida Citrus Bowl: No. 9 Michigan State 37, No. 10 Florida (SEC Runner Up) 34
- Outback Bowl: No. 21 Georgia 28, No. 19 Purdue 25 (OT)
- Gator Bowl: No. 23 Miami 28, No. 17 Georgia Tech 13

=== December bowl games ===
- Peach Bowl: No. 16 Mississippi State 17, Clemson 7
- MicronPC Bowl: Illinois 63, Virginia 21
- Sun Bowl: Oregon 24, No. 13 Minnesota 20
- Alamo Bowl: No. 14 Penn State* 24, No. 18 Texas A&M 0
- Insight.com Bowl: Colorado 62, No. 25 Boston College 28
- Holiday Bowl: No. 7 Kansas State 24, Washington 20
- Liberty Bowl: No. 15 Southern Mississippi (C-USA Champ) 23, Colorado State 17
- Aloha Bowl: Wake Forest 23, Arizona State 3
- Oahu Bowl: Hawaii-Manoa (WAC Champ) 23, Oregon State 17
- Independence Bowl: Mississippi 27, Oklahoma 25
- Music City Bowl: Syracuse 20, Kentucky 13
- Las Vegas Bowl: Utah 17, Fresno State 16
- Motor City Bowl: No. 11 Marshall (MAC Champ) 21, BYU (MWC Champ) 3
- Humanitarian Bowl: Boise State (Big West Champ) 34, Louisville 31
- Mobile Alabama Bowl: TCU 28, No. 20 East Carolina 14

== Heisman Trophy voting ==
The Heisman Trophy is given to the year's most outstanding player

Player	School	Position	1st	2nd	3rd	Total
Ron Dayne	Wisconsin	RB	586	121	42	2,042
Joe Hamilton	Georgia Tech	QB	96	285	136	994
Michael Vick	Virginia Tech	QB	25	72	100	319
Drew Brees	Purdue	QB	3	89	121	308
Chad Pennington	Marshall	QB	21	45	94	247
Peter Warrick	Florida State	WR	14	50	61	203
Shaun Alexander	Alabama	RB	11	43	52	171
Thomas Jones	Virginia	RB	10	32	46	140
LaVar Arrington	Penn State	LB	3	14	17	54
Tim Rattay	Louisiana Tech	QB	1	5	16	29

== Other major awards ==
- Maxwell Award (College Player of the Year) – Ron Dayne, Wisconsin
- Walter Camp Award (Back) – Ron Dayne, Wisconsin
- Davey O'Brien Award (Quarterback) – Joe Hamilton, Georgia Tech
- Johnny Unitas Golden Arm Award (Senior Quarterback) – Chris Redman, Louisville
- Doak Walker Award (Running Back) – Ron Dayne, Wisconsin
- Fred Biletnikoff Award (Wide Receiver) – Troy Walters, Stanford
- Bronko Nagurski Trophy (Defensive Player) – Corey Moore, Virginia Tech, DE
- Chuck Bednarik Award – LaVar Arrington, Penn State
- Dick Butkus Award (Linebacker) – LaVar Arrington, Penn State
- Lombardi Award (Lineman or Linebacker) – Corey Moore, Virginia Tech, DE
- Outland Trophy (Interior Lineman) – Chris Samuels, Alabama, OT
- Jim Thorpe Award (Defensive Back) – Tyrone Carter, Minnesota
- Lou Groza Award (Placekicker) – Sebastian Janikowski, Florida St.
- Paul "Bear" Bryant Award – Frank Beamer, Virginia Tech
- Football Writers Association of America Coach of the Year Award – Frank Beamer, Virginia Tech

== Attendances ==
#	Team	Games	Total	Average
1	Michigan	6	666,049	111,008
2	Tennessee	7	747,870	106,839
3	Penn State	7	675,503	96,500
4	Ohio State	7	654,192	93,456
5	Georgia	6	516,702	86,117
6	Florida	6	512,960	85,493
7	Alabama	7	582,563	83,223
8	Texas	6	496,036	82,673
9	Auburn	7	566,333	80,905
10	Notre Dame	7	560,084	80,012
11	Florida State	6	472,350	78,725
12	LSU	7	550,409	78,630
13	Clemson	5	391,510	78,302
14	South Carolina	6	469,635	78,273
15	Wisconsin	6	468,487	78,081
16	Nebraska	6	466,375	77,729
17	Oklahoma	5	373,320	74,664
18	Michigan State	6	444,886	74,148
19	Texas A&M	6	438,755	73,126
20	Washington	6	430,738	71,790
21	Kentucky	6	406,536	67,756
22	BYU	6	391,111	65,185
23	Purdue	6	380,826	63,471
24	Iowa	6	380,786	63,464
25	Missouri	6	350,242	58,374
26	Southern California	6	345,091	57,515
27	Arizona State	6	343,227	57,205
28	Arkansas	6	321,840	53,640
29	Virginia Tech	6	315,111	52,519
30	Colorado	6	312,751	52,125
31	Arizona	6	306,905	51,151
32	UCLA	6	298,951	49,825
33	Stanford	6	298,430	49,738
34	Kansas State	7	334,959	47,851
35	Mississippi	6	280,973	46,829
36	Syracuse	6	280,445	46,741
37	Virginia	6	277,900	46,317
38	Air Force	5	229,907	45,981
39	Texas Tech	5	229,472	45,894
40	Georgia Tech	6	274,624	45,771
41	West Virginia	6	273,371	45,562
42	Minnesota	7	318,086	45,441
43	Illinois	6	271,745	45,291
44	North Carolina State	5	225,240	45,048
45	Oregon	6	263,622	43,937
46	North Carolina	6	259,000	43,167
47	Oklahoma State	6	258,490	43,082
48	California	5	214,700	42,940
49	East Carolina	7	294,255	42,036
50	Boston College	5	206,734	41,347
51	Pittsburgh	7	287,967	41,138
52	Vanderbilt	7	280,094	40,013
53	Miami Hurricanes	6	235,578	39,263
54	Utah	5	195,853	39,171
55	Iowa State	6	233,578	38,930
56	Hawaii	9	347,712	38,635
57	Louisville	7	268,729	38,390
58	Mississippi State	7	264,749	37,821
59	Fresno State	6	223,384	37,231
60	Indiana	7	255,465	36,495
61	UTEP	5	171,671	34,334
62	Navy	5	170,234	34,047
63	Kansas	7	235,500	33,643
64	Army	6	198,297	33,050
65	Oregon State	6	195,101	32,517
66	Maryland	6	193,275	32,213
67	Northwestern	6	185,070	30,845
68	Baylor	6	175,013	29,169
69	Marshall	7	200,715	28,674
70	San Diego State	5	141,138	28,228
71	Colorado State	5	137,884	27,577
72	Memphis	6	161,597	26,933
73	Western Michigan	5	134,368	26,874
74	Washington State	6	161,229	26,872
75	UNLV	5	131,543	26,309
76	TCU	6	157,738	26,290
77	Rutgers	6	155,188	25,865
78	Southern Miss	5	129,168	25,834
79	Louisiana Tech	4	101,633	25,408
80	Rice	4	101,200	25,300
81	Idaho	4	100,805	25,201
82	New Mexico	6	142,879	23,813
83	Boise State	7	160,853	22,979
84	UCF	6	131,530	21,922
85	Nevada	6	128,841	21,474
86	Toledo	7	149,968	21,424
87	Temple	4	83,084	20,771
88	Tulane	5	103,217	20,643
89	UAB	5	102,244	20,449
90	Houston	5	100,014	20,003
91	Wyoming	6	119,212	19,869
92	Cincinnati	6	118,702	19,784
93	SMU	5	98,127	19,625
94	Wake Forest	6	116,509	19,418
95	Central Michigan	5	96,316	19,263
96	Ohio	5	95,224	19,045
97	Ball State	4	73,541	18,385
98	Duke	5	88,303	17,661
99	North Texas	4	69,793	17,448
100	Utah State	5	87,199	17,440
101	Miami RedHawks	5	86,813	17,363
102	Buffalo	5	84,196	16,839
103	Louisiana-Lafayette	5	79,507	15,901
104	Northern Illinois	5	76,760	15,352
105	Tulsa	6	83,850	13,975
106	Arkansas State	5	68,801	13,760
107	Louisiana-Monroe	4	54,204	13,551
108	New Mexico State	4	52,962	13,241
109	Middle Tennessee State	5	62,359	12,472
110	Eastern Michigan	4	47,290	11,823
111	Bowling Green	5	57,186	11,437
112	Kent	5	51,708	10,342
113	San Jose State	4	23,920	7,973
114	Akron	5	41,378	8,276
