= 1999 Alamo Bowl =

1999 Sylvania Alamo Bowl
| Penn State Nittany Lions | Texas A&M Aggies |
| (9–3) | (8–3) |
| Big Ten | Big 12 |
| 24 | 0 |
| Head coach: Joe Paterno | Head coach: R. C. Slocum |
| AP / Coaches / BCS; 13 / 17 / 11 | AP / Coaches / BCS; 18 / 13 / 14 |
| | 1 | 2 | 3 | 4 | Total |
|---|---|---|---|---|---|
| Penn State | 7 | 7 | 0 | 10 | 24 |
| Texas A&M | 0 | 0 | 0 | 0 | 0 |
- Date: December 28, 1999
- Season: 1999
- Stadium: Alamodome
- Location: San Antonio, Texas
- MVP: Rashard Casey (QB, Penn State); LaVar Arrington (LB, Penn State)
- Favorite: Penn State by 6
- Referee: Rom Gilbert (SEC)
- Attendance: 65,380

United States TV coverage
- Network: ESPN
- Announcers: Ron Franklin (play-by-play), Mike Gottfried (analyst) and Adrian Karsten (sideline)

The 1999 Alamo Bowl featured the Penn State Nittany Lions and the Texas A&M Aggies.

Derek Fox started the scoring for Penn State, with a 34-yard interception return for a touchdown. In the second quarter, quarterback Rashard Casey threw a 45-yard touchdown pass to wide receiver Eddie Drummond. After a scoreless third quarter, Rashard Casey scored on a 4-yard run, to put Penn State up 21–0. Travis Forney then capped the game with a 39-yard field goal.

This game was a bright ending to what was an otherwise disappointing season for Penn State. Ranked #3 in the preseason polls, the team won their first nine games, including victories at #8 Miami and when hosting #4 Arizona. However, the Nittany Lions then lost their last three games by a combined 12 points, dropping them to fourth place in the Big Ten Conference. This was the only shutout bowl victory during Joe Paterno's tenure as head coach of Penn State. The only other bowl shutout for Penn State was a 7–0 defeat of Alabama in the 1959 Liberty Bowl.

The game was Penn State defensive coordinator Jerry Sandusky's last. It is also alleged that Sandusky engaged in sexual misconduct with a minor during the trip to the 1999 Alamo Bowl.

The 2007 Alamo Bowl was Penn State and Texas A&M's only other bowl meeting, where the Nittany Lions edged the Aggies, 24–17. Penn State and Texas A&M have also met twice during regular season play: the Aggies won 27–14 at Penn State in 1979, and the Lions won 25–9 in College Station in 1980.
