= 1999 Miami RedHawks football team =

American college football season

1999 Miami RedHawks football
- Conference: Mid-American Conference
- East Division
- Record: 7–4 (6–2 MAC)
- Head coach: Terry Hoeppner (1st season)
- Home stadium: Yager Stadium

1999 Mid-American Conference football standings
	Conf.			Overall
Team	W		L	W		L
East Division
No. 10 Marshall x$	8	–	0	13	–	0
Miami (OH)	6	–	2	7	–	4
Akron	5	–	3	7	–	4
Ohio	5	–	3	5	–	6
Bowling Green	3	–	5	5	–	6
Kent State	2	–	6	2	–	9
Buffalo	0	–	8	0	–	11
West Division
Western Michigan x	6	–	2	7	–	5
Toledo	5	–	3	6	–	5
Northern Illinois	5	–	3	5	–	6
Eastern Michigan	4	–	4	4	–	7
Central Michigan	3	–	5	4	–	7
Ball State	0	–	8	0	–	11
Championship: Marshall 34, Western Michigan 30
$ – Conference champion; x – Division champion/co-champions; Rankings from AP Poll

The 1999 Miami RedHawks football team represented the Miami University in the 1999 NCAA Division I-A football season. They played their home games at Yager Stadium in Oxford, Ohio and competed as members of the Mid-American Conference. The team was coached by head coach Terry Hoeppner.

== Schedule ==
Date	Time	Opponent	Site	TV	Result	Attendance
September 4	12:30 pm	at Northwestern*	Ryan Field; Evanston, IL		W 28–3	28,108
September 11	12:00 pm	at West Virginia*	Mountaineer Field; Morgantown, WV	ESPN Plus	L 27–43	43,799
September 18	2:00 pm	Eastern Michigan	Yager Stadium; Oxford, OH		W 35–14	15,199
September 25	1:00 pm	at Central Michigan	Kelly/Shorts Stadium; Mount Pleasant, MI		W 24–16	27,041
October 2	2:00 pm	No. 17 Marshall	Yager Stadium; Oxford, OH	ESPN Plus	L 14–32	30,087
October 9	4:00 pm	at Bowling Green	Doyt Perry Stadium; Bowling Green, OH		W 45–31	10,298
October 16	2:00 pm	at Kent State	Dix Stadium; Kent, OH		W 17–10	11,068
October 30	12:30 pm	Cincinnati*^{†}	Yager Stadium; Oxford, OH (Victory Bell)	ESPN Plus	L 42–52	22,469
November 6	1:00 pm	Akron	Yager Stadium; Oxford, OH		W 32–23	10,687
November 13	1:00 pm	at Ohio	Peden Stadium; Athens, OH (Battle of the Bricks)	ONN	L 28–40	20,852
November 20	1:00 pm	Buffalo	Yager Stadium; Oxford, OH		W 43–0	8,371
*Non-conference game; ^{†}Homecoming; Rankings from AP Poll released prior to the game; All times are in Eastern time

== Roster ==
1999 Miami RedHawks football team roster
Players
Coaches
Offense

Pos.	#	Name	Class
QB	8	Mike Bath	Jr
OL	54	Bob Beinecke	Sr
OL	74	Jacob Bell	Fr
TE	83	Brett Bilins	Jr
WR	3	Sly Johnson	Jr
OL	53	Chris Kalafatis	Sr
RB	41	Travis Prentice	Sr
RB	27	Daryl Robinson	Fr
TE	91	Geoff Robinson	Fr
OL	79	Jon Ryder	So
QB	15	John Schacke	Jr
WR	14	Nate Sexton	Sr
OL	63	Justin Smith	Fr
WR	82	Ryan Sprague	Fr
RB	49	Will Stanley	Fr
WR	81	Randy Stegman	Fr
RB	12	James Sterling	Fr
TE	93	Brody Stipp	Fr
OL	75	Alex Sulfsted	Jr
TE	86	Mike Sullivan	Jr

Defense

Pos.	#	Name	Class
DB	7	Rod Clark	So
LB	45	Nathan Clayton	Fr
LB	46	Dustin Cohen	Sr
DB	2	DeMarrio Jones	Jr
LB	48	Robert Jordan	Jr
DL	70	Richard Manuel	Fr
DL	97	Shane Martinkovic	Jr
DL	98	Andy Aracri	Jr
DL	92	Bob Petrovic	Jr
DL	55	Brian Potter	Jr
DL	52	Kyle Judy	Fr
DB	22	Bryan McCullough	Sr
DB	23	Kevin Williams	Sr
DB	28	Jacob Yavasile	Jr
LB	36	Mike Yeager	Sr

Special teams

Pos.	#	Name	Class
P	10	Kent McCullough	Jr

Head coach

- Terry Hoeppner

Coordinators/assistant coaches

Legend

- (C) Team captain
- (S) Suspended
- (I) Ineligible
- Injured
- Redshirt

Roster
Last update: 1999-10-01
