= 1999 Northern Illinois Huskies football team =

American college football season

1999 Northern Illinois Huskies football
- Conference: Mid-American Conference
- West Division
- Record: 5–6 (5–3 MAC)
- Head coach: Joe Novak (4th season)
- Offensive coordinator: Dan Roushar (2nd season)
- MVPs: William Andrews; Donnavan Carter
- Captains: Donnavan Carter; Ryan Diem; Chris Finlen; Lamain Rucker; Mike Stack
- Home stadium: Huskie Stadium

1999 Mid-American Conference football standings
	Conf.			Overall
Team	W		L	W		L
East Division
No. 10 Marshall x$	8	–	0	13	–	0
Miami (OH)	6	–	2	7	–	4
Akron	5	–	3	7	–	4
Ohio	5	–	3	5	–	6
Bowling Green	3	–	5	5	–	6
Kent State	2	–	6	2	–	9
Buffalo	0	–	8	0	–	11
West Division
Western Michigan x	6	–	2	7	–	5
Toledo	5	–	3	6	–	5
Northern Illinois	5	–	3	5	–	6
Eastern Michigan	4	–	4	4	–	7
Central Michigan	3	–	5	4	–	7
Ball State	0	–	8	0	–	11
Championship: Marshall 34, Western Michigan 30
$ – Conference champion; x – Division champion/co-champions; Rankings from AP Poll

The 1999 Northern Illinois Huskies football team represented Northern Illinois University as a member of the West Division of the Mid-American Conference (MAC) during the 1999 NCAA Division I-A football season. Led by fourth-year head coach Joe Novak, the Huskies compiled an overall record of 5–6 with a mark of 5–3 in conference play, tying for second place in the MAC's West Division. Northern Illinois played home games at Huskie Stadium in DeKalb, Illinois.

== Schedule ==
Date	Time	Opponent	Site	TV	Result	Attendance	Source
September 2	6:30 pm	Western Illinois*	Huskie Stadium; DeKalb, IL		L 21–27	17,930	
September 11	3:00 pm	at Vanderbilt*	Vanderbilt Stadium; Nashville, TN	WJYS	L 31–34	28,514	
September 18	5:15 pm	at Iowa*	Kinnick Stadium; Iowa City, IA	ESPN Plus	L 0–24	63,478	
September 25	6:30 pm	Western Michigan	Huskie Stadium; DeKalb, IL		L 21–24	19,213	
October 2	6:00 pm	at Buffalo	University at Buffalo Stadium; Amherst, NY		W 45–21	12,915	
October 9	2:00 pm	Ball State^{†}	Huskie Stadium; DeKalb, IL (rivalry)		W 37–17	18,482	
October 16	12:00 pm	at Central Michigan	Kelly/Shorts Stadium; Mount Pleasant, MI		W 31–27	21,047	
October 23	12:00 pm	Kent State	Huskie Stadium; DeKalb, IL	FSN	W 50–7	11,690	
October 30	3:00 pm	at No. 13 Marshall	Marshall University Stadium; Huntington, WV	FSN	L 9–41	30,081	
November 13	12:00 pm	at Toledo	Glass Bowl; oledo, OH		L 14–44	14,910	
November 20	2:00 pm	Eastern Michigan	Huskie Stadium; DeKalb, IL		W 30–23	9,445	
*Non-conference game; ^{†}Homecoming; Rankings from AP Poll released prior to the game; All times are in Central time
