= 1999 Bowling Green Falcons football team =

American college football season

1999 Bowling Green Falcons football
- Conference: Mid-American Conference
- East Division
- Record: 5–6 (3–5 MAC)
- Head coach: Gary Blackney (9th season)
- Offensive coordinator: Mike Faragalli (4th season)
- Defensive coordinator: Tim Beckman (2nd season)
- Home stadium: Doyt Perry Stadium

1999 Mid-American Conference football standings
	Conf.			Overall
Team	W		L	W		L
East Division
No. 10 Marshall x$	8	–	0	13	–	0
Miami (OH)	6	–	2	7	–	4
Akron	5	–	3	7	–	4
Ohio	5	–	3	5	–	6
Bowling Green	3	–	5	5	–	6
Kent State	2	–	6	2	–	9
Buffalo	0	–	8	0	–	11
West Division
Western Michigan x	6	–	2	7	–	5
Toledo	5	–	3	6	–	5
Northern Illinois	5	–	3	5	–	6
Eastern Michigan	4	–	4	4	–	7
Central Michigan	3	–	5	4	–	7
Ball State	0	–	8	0	–	11
Championship: Marshall 34, Western Michigan 30
$ – Conference champion; x – Division champion/co-champions; Rankings from AP Poll

The 1999 Bowling Green Falcons football team was an American football team that represented Bowling Green University in the Mid-American Conference (MAC) during the 1999 NCAA Division I-A football season. In their ninth season under head coach Gary Blackney, the Falcons compiled a 5–6 record (3–5 against MAC opponents), finished in fifth place in the MAC East Division, and were outscored by all opponents by a combined total of 312 to 296.

The team's statistical leaders included Ricky Schneider with 1,121 passing yards, Joe Alls with 592 rushing yards, and Kurt Gerling with 775 receiving yards.

== Schedule ==
Date	Opponent	Site	Result	Attendance	Source
September 4	at Pittsburgh*	Pitt Stadium; Pittsburgh, PA	L 10–30	30,560	
September 11	Tennessee Tech*	Doyt Perry Stadium; Bowling Green, OH	W 40–15		
September 18	at Marshall	Marshall University Stadium; Huntington, WV	L 16–35	29,741	
September 25	at Kent State	Dix Stadium; Kent, OH (Anniversary Award)	L 27–41		
October 2	Toledo	Doyt Perry Stadium; Bowling Green, OH (rivalry)	W 34–23	23,918	
October 9	Miami (OH)	Doyt Perry Stadium; Bowling Green, OH	L 31–45	10,298	
October 16	at Akron	Rubber Bowl; Akron, OH	L 12–55	6,039	
October 23	at Ohio	Peden Stadium; Athens, OH	L 14–17	18,385	
October 30	Central Michigan	Doyt Perry Stadium; Bowling Green, OH	W 31–7	8,573	
November 13	Ball State	Doyt Perry Stadium; Bowling Green, OH	W 35–14		
November 20	at UCF*	Florida Citrus Bowl; Orlando, FL	W 33–30 ^{OT}	14,299	
*Non-conference game
