= 1999 Eastern Michigan Eagles football team =

American college football season

1999 Eastern Michigan Eagles football
- Conference: Mid-American Conference
- West Division
- Record: 4–7 (4–4 MAC)
- Head coach: Rick Rasnick (5th season; first 10 games); Tony Lombardi (interim, final game)
- Offensive coordinator: Todd Monken (2nd season)
- MVP: Donald "Blake" McCall
- Captains: Brandon Campbell; Walter Church; Donald "Blake" McCall; Tom Michel; Ashley Travis
- Home stadium: Rynearson Stadium

1999 Mid-American Conference football standings
| | Conf. | | | Overall |
| Team | W | | L | W | | L |
|---|---|---|---|---|---|---|
East Division
| No. 10 Marshall x$ | 8 | – | 0 | 13 | – | 0 |
| Miami (OH) | 6 | – | 2 | 7 | – | 4 |
| Akron | 5 | – | 3 | 7 | – | 4 |
| Ohio | 5 | – | 3 | 5 | – | 6 |
| Bowling Green | 3 | – | 5 | 5 | – | 6 |
| Kent State | 2 | – | 6 | 2 | – | 9 |
| Buffalo | 0 | – | 8 | 0 | – | 11 |
West Division
| Western Michigan x | 6 | – | 2 | 7 | – | 5 |
| Toledo | 5 | – | 3 | 6 | – | 5 |
| Northern Illinois | 5 | – | 3 | 5 | – | 6 |
| Eastern Michigan | 4 | – | 4 | 4 | – | 7 |
| Central Michigan | 3 | – | 5 | 4 | – | 7 |
| Ball State | 0 | – | 8 | 0 | – | 11 |
Championship: Marshall 34, Western Michigan 30
$ – Conference champion; x – Division champion/co-champions; Rankings from AP Poll

The 1999 Eastern Michigan Eagles football team represented Eastern Michigan University in the 1999 NCAA Division I-A football season. In their fifth and final season under head coach Rick Rasnick, the Eagles compiled a 4–7 record (4–4 against conference opponents), finished in fourth place in the West Division of the Mid-American Conference, and were outscored by their opponents, 338 to 239. The team's statistical leaders included Walter Church with 2,015 passing yards, Eric Powell with 583 rushing yards, and Brandon Campbell with 764 receiving yards. Donald "Blake" McCall received the team's most valuable player award.

== Schedule ==
| Date | Opponent | Site | Result | Attendance | Source |
|---|---|---|---|---|---|
| September 11 | at Michigan State* | Spartan Stadium; East Lansing, MI | L 7–51 | 72,569 | |
| September 18 | at Miami (OH) | Yager Stadium; Oxford, OH | L 14–35 | 15,199 | |
| September 25 | Akron | Rynearson Stadium; Ypsilanti, MI | W 38–17 | 14,423 | |
| October 2 | at Louisville* | Papa John's Cardinal Stadium; Louisville, KY | L 10–45 | 33,879 | |
| October 9 | Western Michigan^{†} | Rynearson Stadium; Ypsilanti, MI | L 37–40 ^{OT} | 16,524 | |
| October 16 | Ohio | Rynearson Stadium; Ypsilanti, MI | W 27–26 | 10,435 | |
| October 23 | at Toledo | Glass Bowl; Toledo, OH | W 20–13 | 18,801 | |
| October 30 | at UCF* | Florida Citrus Bowl; Orlando, FL | L 6–31 | 27,845 | |
| November 6 | Ball State | Rynearson Stadium; Ypsilanti, MI | W 31–21 | | |
| November 13 | at Central Michigan | Kelly/Shorts Stadium; Mount Pleasant, MI (rivalry) | L 26–29 | 13,321 | |
| November 20 | at Northern Illinois | Huskie Stadium; DeKalb, IL | L 23–30 | 9,445 | |
*Non-conference game; ^{†}Homecoming
