= 1999 Kent State Golden Flashes football team =

American college football season

1999 Kent State Golden Flashes football
- Conference: Mid-American Conference
- East Division
- Record: 2–9 (2–6 MAC)
- Head coach: Dean Pees (2nd season)
- Offensive coordinator: Charley Molnar (6th season)
- Defensive coordinator: Greg Colby (2nd season)
- Home stadium: Dix Stadium

1999 Mid-American Conference football standings
	Conf.			Overall
Team	W		L	W		L
East Division
No. 10 Marshall x$	8	–	0	13	–	0
Miami (OH)	6	–	2	7	–	4
Akron	5	–	3	7	–	4
Ohio	5	–	3	5	–	6
Bowling Green	3	–	5	5	–	6
Kent State	2	–	6	2	–	9
Buffalo	0	–	8	0	–	11
West Division
Western Michigan x	6	–	2	7	–	5
Toledo	5	–	3	6	–	5
Northern Illinois	5	–	3	5	–	6
Eastern Michigan	4	–	4	4	–	7
Central Michigan	3	–	5	4	–	7
Ball State	0	–	8	0	–	11
Championship: Marshall 34, Western Michigan 30
$ – Conference champion; x – Division champion/co-champions; Rankings from AP Poll

The 1999 Kent State Golden Flashes football team was an American football team that represented Kent State University in the Mid-American Conference (MAC) during the 1999 NCAA Division I-A football season. In their second season under head coach Dean Pees, the Golden Flashes compiled a 2–9 record (2–6 against MAC opponents), finished in sixth place in the MAC East, and were outscored by all opponents by a combined total of 376 to 213.

The team's statistical leaders included Chante Murphy with 676 rushing yards, Jose Davis with 1,969 passing yards, and Jason Gavadza with 654 receiving yards.

== Schedule ==
Date	Opponent	Site	Result	Attendance
September 4	at Cincinnati*	Nippert Stadium; Cincinnati, OH	L 3–41	17,210
September 11	Navy*	Dix Stadium; Kent, OH	L 28–48	12,872
September 18	at Pittsburgh*	Pitt Stadium; Pittsburgh, PA	L 23–30	29,840
September 25	Bowling Green	Dix Stadium; Kent, OH (Anniversary Award)	W 41–27	
October 2	at Ohio	Peden Stadium; Athens, OH	L 3–31	18,286
October 9	at Toledo	Glass Bowl; Toledo, OH	L 7–47	18,011
October 16	Miami (OH)	Dix Stadium; Kent, OH	L 10–17	11,068
October 23	at Northern Illinois	Huskie Stadium; DeKalb, IL	L 7–50	11,690
October 30	Buffalo	Dix Stadium; Kent, OH	W 41–20	5,786
November 6	No. 13 Marshall	Dix Stadium; Kent, OH	L 16–28	12,280
November 13	at Akron	Rubber Bowl; Akron, OH (Wagon Wheel)	L 34–37	10,015
*Non-conference game; Rankings from AP Poll released prior to the game
