= 1999 Ohio Bobcats football team =

American college football season

1999 Ohio Bobcats football
- Conference: Mid-American Conference
- East Division
- Record: 5–6 (5–3 MAC)
- Head coach: Jim Grobe (5th season)
- Offensive coordinator: Troy Calhoun (3rd season)
- Defensive coordinator: Brian Knorr (1st season)
- Home stadium: Peden Stadium

1999 Mid-American Conference football standings
	Conf.			Overall
Team	W		L	W		L
East Division
No. 10 Marshall x$	8	–	0	13	–	0
Miami (OH)	6	–	2	7	–	4
Akron	5	–	3	7	–	4
Ohio	5	–	3	5	–	6
Bowling Green	3	–	5	5	–	6
Kent State	2	–	6	2	–	9
Buffalo	0	–	8	0	–	11
West Division
Western Michigan x	6	–	2	7	–	5
Toledo	5	–	3	6	–	5
Northern Illinois	5	–	3	5	–	6
Eastern Michigan	4	–	4	4	–	7
Central Michigan	3	–	5	4	–	7
Ball State	0	–	8	0	–	11
Championship: Marshall 34, Western Michigan 30
$ – Conference champion; x – Division champion/co-champions; Rankings from AP Poll

The 1999 Ohio Bobcats football team represented Ohio University during the 1999 NCAA Division I-A football season. Ohio competed as a member of the Mid-American Conference (MAC) in the East Division. The Bobcats were led by head coach Jim Grobe. They played their home games in Peden Stadium in Athens, Ohio.

== Schedule ==
Date	Time	Opponent	Site	TV	Result	Attendance
September 4	12:00 pm	at Minnesota*	Hubert H. Humphrey Metrodome; Minneapolis, MN		L 7–33	35,552
September 11	7:00 pm	No. 9 (I-AA) Northern Iowa*	Peden Stadium; Athens, OH	ONN	L 21–36	21,275
September 18	3:30 pm	at No. 13 Ohio State*	Ohio Stadium; Columbus, OH	ABC	L 16–40	93,222
September 25	7:00 pm	at Buffalo	Peden Stadium; Athens, OH	ONN	W 45–6	17,277
October 2	7:00 pm	Kent State	Peden Stadium; Athens, OH		W 31–3	18,286
October 9	3:00 pm	at Akron	Rubber Bowl; Akron, OH		L 28–41	7,665
October 16	6:00 pm	at Eastern Michigan	Rynearson Stadium; Ypsilanti, MI	ONN	L 26–27	10,435
October 23	1:00 pm	Bowling Green^{†}	Peden Stadium; Athens, OH		W 17–14	18,385
October 30	2:00 pm	at Ball State	Ball State Stadium; Muncie, IN		W 37–25	18,821
November 13	1:00 pm	Miami (OH)	Peden Stadium; Athens, OH (Battle of the Bricks)	ONN	W 40–28	20,852
November 26	11:30 am	at No. 12 Marshall	Marshall University Stadium; Huntington, WV (Battle for the Bell)	FSN	L 3–34	26,053
*Non-conference game; ^{†}Homecoming; Rankings from AP Poll released prior to the game; All times are in Eastern time
