= 1999 Ball State Cardinals football team =

American college football season

1999 Ball State Cardinals football
- Conference: Mid-American Conference
- West Division
- Record: 0–11 (0–8 MAC)
- Head coach: Bill Lynch (5th season)
- Home stadium: Ball State Stadium

1999 Mid-American Conference football standings
| | Conf. | | | Overall |
| Team | W | | L | W | | L |
|---|---|---|---|---|---|---|
East Division
| No. 10 Marshall x$ | 8 | – | 0 | 13 | – | 0 |
| Miami (OH) | 6 | – | 2 | 7 | – | 4 |
| Akron | 5 | – | 3 | 7 | – | 4 |
| Ohio | 5 | – | 3 | 5 | – | 6 |
| Bowling Green | 3 | – | 5 | 5 | – | 6 |
| Kent State | 2 | – | 6 | 2 | – | 9 |
| Buffalo | 0 | – | 8 | 0 | – | 11 |
West Division
| Western Michigan x | 6 | – | 2 | 7 | – | 5 |
| Toledo | 5 | – | 3 | 6 | – | 5 |
| Northern Illinois | 5 | – | 3 | 5 | – | 6 |
| Eastern Michigan | 4 | – | 4 | 4 | – | 7 |
| Central Michigan | 3 | – | 5 | 4 | – | 7 |
| Ball State | 0 | – | 8 | 0 | – | 11 |
Championship: Marshall 34, Western Michigan 30
$ – Conference champion; x – Division champion/co-champions; Rankings from AP Poll

The 1999 Ball State Cardinals football team was an American football team that represented Ball State University in the West Division of the Mid-American Conference (MAC) during the 1999 NCAA Division I-A football season. In its fifth season under head coach Bill Lynch, the team compiled a 0–11 record (0–8 against conference opponents) and finished in sixth place out of six teams in the MAC West. The team played its home games at Ball State Stadium in Muncie, Indiana.

The team's statistical leaders included Brian Conn with 1,525 passing yards, Nick Dunbar with 592 rushing yards, and Adrian Reese with 664 receiving yards and 30 points scored.

== Schedule ==
| Date | Opponent | Site | Result | Attendance | Source |
|---|---|---|---|---|---|
| September 4 | at Indiana* | Memorial Stadium; Bloomington, IN | L 9–21 | 31,238 | |
| September 11 | at No. 9 Wisconsin* | Camp Randall Stadium; Madison, WI | L 10–50 | 75,807 | |
| September 18 | Toledo | Ball State Stadium; Muncie, IN | L 10–23 | | |
| September 25 | at Army* | Michie Stadium; West Point, NY | L 21–41 | 30,082 | |
| October 2 | Akron | Ball State Stadium; Muncie, IN | L 9–31 | | |
| October 9 | at Northern Illinois | Huskie Stadium; DeKalb, IL (rivalry) | L 17–37 | 18,482 | |
| October 23 | at Western Michigan | Waldo Stadium; Kalamazoo, MI | L 0–28 | | |
| October 30 | Ohio | Ball State Stadium; Muncie, IN | L 25–37 | | |
| November 6 | at Eastern Michigan | Rynearson Stadium; Ypsilanti, MI | L 21–31 | | |
| November 13 | at Bowling Green | Doyt Perry Stadium; Bowling Green, OH | L 14–35 | | |
| November 20 | Central Michigan | Ball State Stadium; Muncie, IN | L 21–27 | | |
*Non-conference game; Rankings from AP Poll released prior to the game

== Roster ==
1999 Ball State Cardinals football team roster
Players
Coaches
Offense 77 Jason Baksas OL 6-5 250 Fr 78 Kris Berry OL 6-4 255 Fr. Hartford City, Ind. 63 Nathan Boyd C 6-2 294 So. Evansville, Ind. 60 Ryan Carter OT 6-5 305 Sr. Clyde, Ohio 23 Kevin Cartwright TB 6-0 206 Jr. Jasper, Ind. 67 Lavar Charleston OT 6-3 262 So. Detroit, Mich. 9 Brian Conn QB 6-2 211 So. Elkhart, Ind. 4 Jamar Cottee WR 5-9 177 So. Terre Haute, Ind. 84 Montez Currin WR 5-11 176 Sr. Indianapolis, Ind. 85 Robert Dascal WR 6-0 190 Fr. Bloomington, Ind. 48 Tony DelAngel FB 6-1 234 So. Bolingbrook, Ill. 26 Nick Dunbar TB 5-10 194 Fr. Bloomington, Ind. 97 Jon Eckert TE 6-5 229 Fr. New Bremen, Ohio 15 Talmadge Hill QB 6-1 185 Fr. Oak Park, Ill. 57 Mike Jantzen OL 6-2 280 Fr. New Haven, Ky. 74 Aaron Johnson OT 6-5 310 Jr. Duluth, Minn. 7 Anthony Jones TB 5-10 179 So. Gary, Ind. 87 Jermaine Jordan WR 6-2 197 Jr. Glendale Heights, Ill. 59 Chad Ludwig C 6-3 310 Jr. Bloomingdale, Ill. 21 Billy Lynch WR 5-9 150 So. Muncie, Ind. 44 Marcus Merriweather TB 6-1 210 So. Fort Wayne, Ind. 79 David Miller OG 6-3 315 Fr. Goshen, Ind. 61 John Moore OG 6-6 310 So. Kettering, Ohio 96 Doug Nelson TE 6-5 261 Jr. Indianapolis, Ind. 45 Gerald Palmer FB 6-0 235 So. Louisville, Ky. 14 Corey Parchman WR 6-1 177 Jr. Indianapolis, Ind. 89 Jimmy Place TE 6-7 230 Sr. Dayton, Ohio 80 Clint Planck WR 6-4 200 Fr. Middletown, Ohio 20 Adrian Reese WR 5-9 169 Sr. Fort Wayne, Ind. 19 Andy Roesch QB 6-4 210 Fr. Galion, Ohio 34 Sean Schembra WR 5-11 185 Fr. Indianapolis, Ind. 12 Ryan Schrink QB 6-0 201 Fr. Seymour, Ind. 49 Johnny Short TB 5-8 185 Fr. Kankakee, Ill. 65 Shane Smith OG 6-5 300 So. Akron, Ohio 71 Chris Sorrells OT 6-4 256 So. Fishers, Ind. 95 Tim Streit TE 6-5 238 Fr. Fishers, Ind. 32 Quavis Tate TB 5-6 191 Jr. Fort Wayne, Ind. 73 Jeff Thiel OG 6-4 305 Jr. Dyer, Ind. 68 Andrew Thompson OL 6-6 320 Fr. Milan, Ind. 38 Scott Volk FB 5-11 228 Fr. Crown Point, Ind. 6 Clay Walters QB 6-5 205 Jr. Carmel, Ind. 82 David Westbrook WR 6-3 190 So. Muncie, Ind. 70 Brian Whalen OT 6-5 270 So. Glenview, Ill.

| Pos. | # | Name | Class |
|---|---|---|---|
| WR | 5 | Tony Ajibade | So |
| RB | 1 | Jesse Avant | Fr |

Defense 8 Vernard Alsberry OLB 6-0 198 So. University Park, Ill. 24 Nate Andrews OLB 5-10 197 Jr. Nappanee, Ind. 2 Charles Avant CB 5-10 182 Fr 33 Chikosi Bell DB 5-10 165 Jr. Diamondbar, Calif. 3 Alger Boswell CB 5-7 188 So. Gary, Ind. 35 Cornelius Bowick ILB 6-2 216 Jr. Fort Wayne, Ind. 30 Jeremy Coleman CB 5-10 175 Fr. Indianapolis, Ind. 92 Rachman Crable DE 6-3 243 So. Indianapolis, Ind. 27 Donald Crumpton OLB 6-3 185 So. Indianapolis, Ind. 18 Byron Driver OLB 6-0 197 Jr. Fort Wayne, Ind. 78 James Easley DL 5-9 200 So. Fort Wayne, Ind. 42 Lowell Faison CB 5-9 189 Sr. Norfolk, Va. 99 Bayette George DE 6-2 240 So. Valparaiso, Ind. 86 John Hauser OLB 5-10 185 Fr. Columbus, Ohio 56 Merco Hietberg DL 6-4 270 Fr. Mooreseville, Ind. 64 Colin Johnson DT 6-1 275 Fr. Joliet, Ill. 58 Shaka Johnson ILB 5-11 225 So. University Park, Ill. 94 Brendan Kavanagh ILB 6-2 210 Fr. Lockport, Ill. 22 Obie LeFlore S 5-10 178 So. Chicago, Ill. 36 Allen Lidy ILB 6-0 252 So. Newburgh, Ind. 52 Marlon Llewellyn ILB 5-11 216 Sr. Ft. Lauderdale, Fla. 13 Chickaro Martin CB 5-10 164 Jr. Fort Wayne, Ind. 53 Rob Mayzer DL 6-3 255 Fr. Westerville, Ohio 51 Matt Messaros DT 6-0 276 Jr. Gahanna, Ohio 50 Andrew Metzler ILB 5-11 220 Fr. Zionsville, Ind. 31 Steve Monson DB 5-10 175 Fr. Bolingbrook, Ill. 43 Doug Owusu DB 6-0 170 Fr. Bolingbrook, Ill. 55 Greg Pagnard DL 6-3 275 Fr. Tiffin, Ohio 28 Nate Perry OLB 6-1 214 Sr. Flint, Mich. 37 Ernest Pressley ILB 6-1 203 Sr. Opa Locka, Fla. 66 Sunungura Rusununguko DE 6-2 248 Jr. Indianapolis, Ind. 11 Pete Smith S 5-10 160 Jr. Fort Wayne, Ind. 39 Keith Story CB 5-8 166 So. Fort Wayne, Ind. 47 Paul Strabavy ILB 6-2 225 Fr. Whiting, Ind. 25 Jason Teeters CB 5-6 173 So. Muncie, Ind. 10 Lecedus Thompson OLB 6-0 213 Sr. Lauderdale Lakes, Fla. 76 Evan Triggs DT 6-3 266 Jr. Indianapolis, Ind. 91 Brent Walker ILB 6-2 223 So. McCordsville, Ind. 40 Wayne Washington OLB 6-0 192 Fr. Oak Park, Ill. 17 Jade Winchell S 5-10 193 Fr. Santa Claus, Ind. 72 Mark Zackery DT 5-11 262 So. Indianapolis, Ind.

| Pos. | # | Name | Class |
|---|---|---|---|
| DT | 93 | Marcus Adams | So |

Special teams 88 Kevin Jennings P 6-0 205 Sr. Indianapolis, Ind. 16 Brad Kroft P 6-2 222 Sr. Marietta, Ohio 41 Thomas Pucke PK 5-10 205 So. Reading, Ohio

| Pos. | # | Name | Class |

Head coach

- Bill Lynch

Coordinators/assistant coaches

Legend

- (C) Team captain
- (S) Suspended
- (I) Ineligible
- Injured
- Redshirt

Roster
