= 1999 Akron Zips football team =

American college football season

1999 Akron Zips football
- Conference: Mid-American Conference
- East Division
- Record: 7–4 (5–3 MAC)
- Head coach: Lee Owens (5th season)
- Offensive coordinator: Paul Winters (5th season)
- Defensive coordinator: Joe Palmisano (2nd season)
- Captains: George Cameron; Jon Eaton; Steve Hale; Dan Wessman
- Home stadium: Rubber Bowl

1999 Mid-American Conference football standings
	Conf.			Overall
Team	W		L	W		L
East Division
No. 10 Marshall x$	8	–	0	13	–	0
Miami (OH)	6	–	2	7	–	4
Akron	5	–	3	7	–	4
Ohio	5	–	3	5	–	6
Bowling Green	3	–	5	5	–	6
Kent State	2	–	6	2	–	9
Buffalo	0	–	8	0	–	11
West Division
Western Michigan x	6	–	2	7	–	5
Toledo	5	–	3	6	–	5
Northern Illinois	5	–	3	5	–	6
Eastern Michigan	4	–	4	4	–	7
Central Michigan	3	–	5	4	–	7
Ball State	0	–	8	0	–	11
Championship: Marshall 34, Western Michigan 30
$ – Conference champion; x – Division champion/co-champions; Rankings from AP Poll

The 1999 Akron Zips football team represented Akron University in the 1999 NCAA Division I-A football season; they competed in the Mid-American Conference. They were led by fifth–year head coach Lee Owens. The Zips played their home games at the Rubber Bowl in Akron, Ohio. They outscored their opponents 315–314 and finished with a record of 7 wins and 4 losses (7–4).

The Zips spoiled Navy's homecoming on October 23, winning 35–29, after trailing 23–0.

== Schedule ==
Date	Opponent	Site	Result	Attendance	Source
September 4	at No. 2 Penn State*	Beaver Stadium; University Park, PA	L 24–70	95,192	
September 11	at Buffalo	University at Buffalo Stadium; Buffalo, NY	W 17–10	20,835	
September 18	Temple*	Rubber Bowl; Akron, OH	W 25–15	10,980	
September 25	at Eastern Michigan	Rynearson Stadium; Ypsilanti, MI	L 17–38	14,423	
October 2	at Ball State	Ball State Stadium; Muncie, IN	W 31–9	20,752	
October 9	Ohio	Rubber Bowl; Akron, OH	W 41–28	7,665	
October 16	Bowling Green	Rubber Bowl; Akron, OH	W 55–25	6,039	
October 23	at Navy*	Navy–Marine Corps Memorial Stadium; Annapolis, MD	W 35–29	30,780	
October 30	Western Michigan	Rubber Bowl; Akron, OH	L 10–24	6,679	
November 6	at Miami (OH)	Yager Stadium; Oxford, OH	L 23–32	10,687	
November 13	Kent State	Rubber Bowl; Akron, OH (Wagon Wheel)	W 37–34	10,015	
*Non-conference game; Rankings from AP Poll released prior to the game
