= 1999 Toledo Rockets football team =

American college football season

1999 Toledo Rockets football
- Conference: Mid-American Conference
- West Division
- Record: 6–5 (5–3 MAC)
- Head coach: Gary Pinkel (9th season)
- Offensive coordinator: Dave Christensen (3rd season)
- Offensive scheme: Multiple
- Defensive coordinator: Tom Amstutz (6th season)
- Base defense: 4–4
- Home stadium: Glass Bowl

1999 Mid-American Conference football standings
	Conf.			Overall
Team	W		L	W		L
East Division
No. 10 Marshall x$	8	–	0	13	–	0
Miami (OH)	6	–	2	7	–	4
Akron	5	–	3	7	–	4
Ohio	5	–	3	5	–	6
Bowling Green	3	–	5	5	–	6
Kent State	2	–	6	2	–	9
Buffalo	0	–	8	0	–	11
West Division
Western Michigan x	6	–	2	7	–	5
Toledo	5	–	3	6	–	5
Northern Illinois	5	–	3	5	–	6
Eastern Michigan	4	–	4	4	–	7
Central Michigan	3	–	5	4	–	7
Ball State	0	–	8	0	–	11
Championship: Marshall 34, Western Michigan 30
$ – Conference champion; x – Division champion/co-champions; Rankings from AP Poll

The 1999 Toledo Rockets football team represented the University of Toledo during the 1999 NCAA Division I-A football season. They competed as a member of the Mid-American Conference (MAC) in the West Division. The Rockets were led by head coach Gary Pinkel.

== Schedule ==
Date	Time	Opponent	Site	TV	Result	Attendance	Source
September 2	8:00 p.m.	Syracuse*	Glass Bowl; Toledo, OH	ESPN Plus	L 12–35	27,900	
September 18	2:00 p.m.	at Ball State	Ball State Stadium; Muncie, IN		W 23–10	15,460	
September 25	7:00 p.m.	UMass*	Glass Bowl; Toledo, OH		W 24–3	20,916	
October 2	7:00 p.m.	at Bowling Green	Doyt Perry Stadium; Bowling Green, OH (rivalry)	ESPN Plus	L 23–34	23,918	
October 9	7:00 p.m.	Kent State	Glass Bowl; Toledo, OH		W 47–7	18,011	
October 14	8:00 p.m.	at No. 15 Marshall	Marshall University Stadium; Huntington, WV	ESPN	L 13–38	30,203	
October 23	1:00 p.m.	Eastern Michigan^{†}	Glass Bowl; Toledo, OH		L 13–20	18,801	
October 30	1:00 p.m.	Louisiana Tech*	Glass Bowl; Toledo, OH		L 17–34	17,904	
November 6	12:00 p.m.	at Central Michigan	Kelly/Shorts Stadium; Mount Pleasant, MI	FSN	W 32–13	9,012	
November 13	1:00 p.m.	Northern Illinois	Glass Bowl; Toledo, OH		W 44–14	14,910	
November 20	1:00 p.m.	Western Michigan	Glass Bowl; Toledo, OH		W 45–21	11,557	
*Non-conference game; ^{†}Homecoming; Rankings from AP Poll released prior to the game; All times are in Eastern time

== Roster ==
1999 Toledo Rockets football team roster
Players
Coaches
Offense

Pos.	#	Name	Class
WR	17	Donta Greene	Fr
TB	19	Chester Taylor	Jr
WR	23	Carl Ford	Fr
WR	80	Mel Long	Jr

Defense

Pos.	#	Name	Class

Special teams

Pos.	#	Name	Class

Head coach

- Gary Pinkel

Coordinators/assistant coaches

- Dave Christensen – Offensive coordinator and offensive line
- David Yost – Quarterbacks and recruiting coordinator
- Brian Jones – Running backs
- Cornell Ford – Wide receivers
- Bruce Walker – Tight ends
- Tom Amstutz – Defensive coordinator and assistant head coach
- Craig Kuligowski – Defensive line
- David Walkosky – Outside linebacker
- Matt Eberflus – Defensive backs
- David Hutchinson – Graduate assistant
- Mark Lister – Graduate assistant
- Ted Smith – Graduate assistant

Legend

- (C) Team captain
- (S) Suspended
- (I) Ineligible
- Injured
- Redshirt

Roster
