= 1999 Central Michigan Chippewas football team =

American college football season

1999 Central Michigan Chippewas football
- Conference: Mid-American Conference
- West Division
- Record: 4–7 (3–5 MAC)
- Head coach: Dick Flynn (6th season)
- Offensive coordinator: Tom Kearly (9th season)
- MVP: Joe Adam
- Home stadium: Kelly/Shorts Stadium

1999 Mid-American Conference football standings
	Conf.			Overall
Team	W		L	W		L
East Division
No. 10 Marshall x$	8	–	0	13	–	0
Miami (OH)	6	–	2	7	–	4
Akron	5	–	3	7	–	4
Ohio	5	–	3	5	–	6
Bowling Green	3	–	5	5	–	6
Kent State	2	–	6	2	–	9
Buffalo	0	–	8	0	–	11
West Division
Western Michigan x	6	–	2	7	–	5
Toledo	5	–	3	6	–	5
Northern Illinois	5	–	3	5	–	6
Eastern Michigan	4	–	4	4	–	7
Central Michigan	3	–	5	4	–	7
Ball State	0	–	8	0	–	11
Championship: Marshall 34, Western Michigan 30
$ – Conference champion; x – Division champion/co-champions; Rankings from AP Poll

The 1999 Central Michigan Chippewas football team was an American football team that represented Central Michigan University in the Mid-American Conference (MAC) during the 1999 NCAA Division I-A football season. In their sixth and final season under head coach Dick Flynn, the Chippewas compiled a 4–7 record (3–5 against MAC opponents), finished in fifth place in the MAC's West Division, and were outscored by their opponents, 344 to 229. The team played its home games in Kelly/Shorts Stadium in Mount Pleasant, Michigan, with attendance of 89,698 in five home games.

The team's statistical leaders included Pete Shepherd with 2,295 passing yards, Eric Flowers with 766 rushing yards, and Jammarl O'Neal with 1,085 receiving yards. O'Neal became only the second Central Michigan player to total over 1,000 receiving yards. Defensive tackle Joe Adam was selected as the team's most valuable player.

On November 9, Flynn announced his resignation as Central Michigan's head coach, effective after the final two games of the season. He had been with Central Michigan for 22 years, including the final six years as the head football coach. Flynn compiled a 28–37 record as head coach.

== Schedule ==
Date	Opponent	Site	Result	Attendance	Source
September 2	Eastern Illinois*	Kelly/Shorts Stadium; Mount Pleasant, MI	W 33–17	19,267	
September 11	at Syracuse*	Carrier Dome; Syracuse, NY	L 7–47	45,563	
September 18	at No. 14 Purdue*	Ross–Ade Stadium; West Lafayette, IN	L 16–58	58,349	
September 25	Miami (OH)	Kelly/Shorts Stadium; Mount Pleasant, MI	L 16–24	27,041	
October 2	at Western Michigan	Waldo Stadium; Kalamazoo, MI (rivalry)	L 16–38	36,102	
October 9	at Buffalo	University at Buffalo Stadium; Buffalo, NY	W 38–19	16,128	
October 16	Northern Illinois^{†}	Kelly/Shorts Stadium; Mount Pleasant, MI	L 27–31	21,047	
October 30	at Bowling Green	Doyt Perry Stadium; Bowling Green, OH	L 7–31	8,573	
November 6	Toledo	Kelly/Shorts Stadium; Mount Pleasant, MI	L 13–32	9,012	
November 13	Eastern Michigan	Kelly/Shorts Stadium; Mount Pleasant, MI (rivalry)	W 29–26	13,321	
November 20	at Ball State	Scheumann Stadium; Muncie, IN	W 27–21	17,327	
*Non-conference game; ^{†}Homecoming; Rankings from AP Poll released prior to the game
