= 1999 Buffalo Bulls football team =

American college football season

1999 Buffalo Bulls football
- Conference: Mid-American Conference
- East Division
- Record: 0–11 (0–8 MAC)
- Head coach: Craig Cirbus (5th season)
- Defensive coordinator: Joe Reich (3rd season)
- Captains: Mike Garofalo; Drew Haddad; Tom Brown; Josh Stello; Carlos Spencer
- Home stadium: University at Buffalo Stadium

1999 Mid-American Conference football standings
	Conf.			Overall
Team	W		L	W		L
East Division
No. 10 Marshall x$	8	–	0	13	–	0
Miami (OH)	6	–	2	7	–	4
Akron	5	–	3	7	–	4
Ohio	5	–	3	5	–	6
Bowling Green	3	–	5	5	–	6
Kent State	2	–	6	2	–	9
Buffalo	0	–	8	0	–	11
West Division
Western Michigan x	6	–	2	7	–	5
Toledo	5	–	3	6	–	5
Northern Illinois	5	–	3	5	–	6
Eastern Michigan	4	–	4	4	–	7
Central Michigan	3	–	5	4	–	7
Ball State	0	–	8	0	–	11
Championship: Marshall 34, Western Michigan 30
$ – Conference champion; x – Division champion/co-champions; Rankings from AP Poll

The 1999 Buffalo Bulls football team represented the University at Buffalo as a member of the Mid-American Conference (MAC) during the 1999 NCAA Division I-AA football season. Led by fifth-year head coach Craig Cirbus, the Bulls compiled an overall record of 0–11 with a mark of 0–8 in conference play, placing last out of seven teams in the MAC's East Division. The team played home games at the University at Buffalo Stadium in Amherst, New York.

== Schedule ==
Date	Time	Opponent	Site	TV	Result	Attendance	Source
September 11	7:00 pm	Akron	University at Buffalo Stadium; Amherst, NY		L 10–17	20,835	
September 18	7:00 pm	at Connecticut*	Memorial Stadium; Storrs, CT		L 0–23	12,547	
September 25	7:00 pm	at Ohio	Peden Stadium; Athens, OH	ESN	L 6–45	17,277	
October 2	7:00 pm	Northern Illinois	University at Buffalo Stadium; Amherst, NY		L 21–45	12,915	
October 9	1:30 pm	Central Michigan^{†}	University at Buffalo Stadium; Amherst, NY		L 19–38	16,128	
October 16	6:00 pm	at Western Michigan	Waldo Stadium; Kalamazoo, MI		L 17–45	15,516	
October 23	12:00 pm	No. 15 Marshall	University at Buffalo Stadium; Amherst, NY	ESN	L 3–59	13,120	
October 30	2:00 pm	at Kent State	Dix Stadium; Kent, OH		L 20–41	5,786	
November 6	12:00 pm	Hofstra*	University at Buffalo Stadium; Amherst, NY		L 13–20	8,699	
November 13	1:00 pm	at Virginia*	Scott Stadium; Charlottesville, VA		L 21–50	40,100	
November 20	1:00 pm	at Miami (OH)	Yager Stadium; Oxford, OH		L 0–43	8,371	
*Non-conference game; ^{†}Homecoming; Rankings from AP Poll released prior to the game; All times are in Eastern time

== After the season ==
=== NFL draft ===
The following Bull was selected in the 2000 NFL draft following the season.

Round	Pick	Player	Position	NFL club
7	233	Drew Haddad	Wide receiver	Buffalo Bills
