= 1999 Western Michigan Broncos football team =

American college football season

1999 Western Michigan Broncos football

MAC West Division champion

MAC Championship Game, L 30–34 vs. Marshall
- Conference: Mid-American Conference
- West Division
- Record: 7–5 (6–2 MAC)
- Head coach: Gary Darnell (3rd season)
- Offensive coordinator: Bill Cubit (3rd season)
- Defensive coordinator: Chuck Driesbach (3rd season)
- MVP: Tim Lester
- Home stadium: Waldo Stadium

1999 Mid-American Conference football standings
	Conf.			Overall
Team	W		L	W		L
East Division
No. 10 Marshall x$	8	–	0	13	–	0
Miami (OH)	6	–	2	7	–	4
Akron	5	–	3	7	–	4
Ohio	5	–	3	5	–	6
Bowling Green	3	–	5	5	–	6
Kent State	2	–	6	2	–	9
Buffalo	0	–	8	0	–	11
West Division
Western Michigan x	6	–	2	7	–	5
Toledo	5	–	3	6	–	5
Northern Illinois	5	–	3	5	–	6
Eastern Michigan	4	–	4	4	–	7
Central Michigan	3	–	5	4	–	7
Ball State	0	–	8	0	–	11
Championship: Marshall 34, Western Michigan 30
$ – Conference champion; x – Division champion/co-champions; Rankings from AP Poll

The 1999 Western Michigan Broncos football team represented Western Michigan University in the Mid-American Conference (MAC) during the 1999 NCAA Division I-A football season. In their third season under head coach Gary Darnell, the Broncos compiled a 7–5 record (6–2 against MAC opponents), finished in a tie for first place in the MAC's West Division, outscored their opponents, 373 to 342, and lost to Marshall in the MAC Football Championship Game. The team played its home games at Waldo Stadium in Kalamazoo, Michigan.

The team's statistical leaders included Tim Lester with 3,639 passing yards, Robert Sanford with 1,137 rushing yards, and Steve Neal with 1,113 receiving yards.

== Schedule ==
Date	Opponent	Site	Result	Attendance	Source
September 4	at No. 4 Florida*	Ben Hill Griffin Stadium; Gainesville, FL	L 26–55	85,322	
September 11	No. 19 (I-AA) Youngstown State*	Waldo Stadium; Kalamazoo, MI	W 46–28	35,874	
September 18	at Missouri*	Faurot Field; Columbia, MO	L 34–48	60,206	
September 25	at Northern Illinois	Huskie Stadium; DeKalb, IL	W 24–21	19,213	
October 2	Central Michigan	Waldo Stadium; Kalamazoo, MI (rivalry)	W 38–16	36,102	
October 9	at Eastern Michigan	Rynearson Stadium; Ypsilanti, MI	W 40–37 ^{OT}	16,524	
October 16	Buffalo	Waldo Stadium; Kalamazoo, MI	W 45–17	15,516	
October 23	Ball State	Waldo Stadium; Kalamazoo, MI	W 28–0	16,404	
October 30	at Akron	Rubber Bowl; Akron, OH	W 24–10	6,679	
November 13	No. 12 Marshall	Waldo Stadium; Kalamazoo, MI	L 17–31	30,472	
November 20	at Toledo	Glass Bowl; Toledo, OH	L 21–45	11,557	
December 3	at No. 11 Marshall	Marshall University Stadium; Huntington, WV (MAC Championship Game)	L 30–34	28,069	
*Non-conference game; Rankings from AP Poll released prior to the game

== Roster ==
1999 Western Michigan Broncos football team roster
Players
Coaches
Offense

Pos.	#	Name	Class
WR	17	Matt LaFleur	Fr
TE	84	Jake Moreland	Sr
WR	85	Antonio Thomas	Fr

Defense

Pos.	#	Name	Class
DT	98	Chad Wangerin	Fr

Special teams

Pos.	#	Name	Class
P	6	J. D. Brink	Sr

Head coach

- Gary Darnell

Coordinators/assistant coaches

Legend

- (C) Team captain
- (S) Suspended
- (I) Ineligible
- Injured
- Redshirt

Roster
Last update: 2000-01-16
