= Doug Chapman (American football) =

American football player and coach (born 1977)

Marshall Thundering Herd
- Title: Director of player development

Personal information
- Born: August 22, 1977 (age 49); Flint, Michigan, U.S.
- Listed height: 5 ft 10 in (1.78 m)
- Listed weight: 213 lb (97 kg)

Career information
- Position: Running back (No. 34)
- High school: Lloyd C. Bird (Chesterfield, Virginia)
- College: Marshall
- NFL draft: 2000: 3rd round, 88th overall pick

Career history

Playing
- Minnesota Vikings (2000–2003); San Diego Chargers (2004)*
- * Offseason or practice squad member only

Coaching
- Marshall (2021–present) Director of player development & senior analyst

Awards and highlights
- NCAA I-AA national champion (1996); 2× First-team All-MAC (1998, 1999); Second-team All-MAC (1997)

Career NFL statistics
- Rushing yards: 317
- Average: 3.5
- Touchdowns: 1
- Stats at Pro Football Reference

Doug Chapman (born August 22, 1977) is an American former professional football player who was a running back in the National Football League (NFL). He was selected in the third round of the 2000 NFL draft, 88th overall, by the Minnesota Vikings where he played from 2000 to 2003 and with the San Diego Chargers in 2004. He is currently serving as the director of player development and senior analyst at Marshall.

== College career ==
Chapman attended Marshall University, where he rushed for over 4,000 yards and scored 61 total touchdowns. He was a member of the undefeated 1996 Marshall Thundering Herd football team that won the 1996 NCAA Division I-AA Football Championship Game and Mid-American Conference championship in 1997, 1998 and 1999. He was MVP of the 1999 Motor City Bowl and was inducted into the Marshall University Hall of Fame in 2010.

== Professional career ==
In his first NFL start versus the Green Bay Packers, Chapman rushed for 90 yards, which was the most allowed by Green Bay's defense through six weeks of the regular season. An offensive penalty negated his first 100-yard rushing performance. After Minnesota, Chapman signed with the San Diego Chargers in 2004, where he suffered a career ending back injury during preseason against the Indianapolis Colts. Chapman officially retired in 2006.

== NFL career statistics ==
Legend
**Bold**	Career high

Year	Team	Games		Rushing					Receiving				
Year	Team	GP	GS	Att	Yds	Avg	Lng	TD	Rec	Yds	Avg	Lng	TD
2001	MIN	16	3	**63**	**195**	3.1	19	0	**16**	**135**	**8.4**	**38**	**1**
2002	MIN	6	0	12	89	**7.4**	**27**	0	0	0	0.0	0	0
2003	MIN	4	0	15	33	2.2	6	0	1	8	8.0	8	0
		26	3	90	317	3.5	27	0	17	143	8.4	38	1

== Post-playing career ==
Chapman was an on-air color commentator with ESPN and CBS Sports Network from 2008 to 2012. While serving as an NFL and college football expert for Campus Insiders and 120 Sports (now Stadium), Chapman joined the Big Ten Network for the 2013 & 2014 seasons as an analyst on Big Ten & Beyond, making his debut on September 3, 2013. Chapman then helped launch and serve as anchor and Director of Content for American Sports Network, a startup linear network affiliated with Sinclair Broadcast Group through 2017.

In February 2021, Chapman was hired at Marshall as a senior analyst and director of player development under first-year head coach Charles Huff.
