= J. R. Jenkins =

American football player (born 1979)

No. 6
- Position: Kicker

Personal information
- Born: January 31, 1979 (age 47); Springfield, Illinois
- Listed height: 6 ft 1 in (1.85 m)
- Listed weight: 195 lb (88 kg)

Career information
- High school: Loganville (Loganville, Georgia)
- College: Marshall
- NFL draft: 2001: undrafted

Career history
- Detroit Fury (2001–2002); Baltimore Ravens (2002); Berlin Thunder (2003)

Career NFL statistics
- Field goals: 0
- Field goal attempts: 1
- Stats at Pro Football Reference

Career AFL statistics
- Field goals: 3
- Field goal attempts: 13
- Extra points: 51
- Extra point attempts: 56
- Stats at ArenaFan.com

John Robert Jenkins (born January 31, 1979) is an American football former kicker in the National Football League for the Baltimore Ravens.

== Football career ==
Jenkins played football at Marshall University from 1997 to 2001 as a kicker, handling kickoff duties for the first two seasons before becoming the team's primary kicker in 1999. He went undrafted in the 2001 NFL draft.

=== Detroit Fury ===
After leaving Marshall University, Jenkins signed with the Detroit Fury of the Arena Football League on June 6, 2001, to replace Detroit's previous kicker, Kent Baker. During a playoff game against the Arizona Rattlers, Jenkins kicked a 57-yard field goal, the longest of his professional football career. He left the AFL April 22, 2002, to sign with the Baltimore Ravens of the NFL.

=== Baltimore Ravens ===
During the 2001–02 offseason, the Baltimore Ravens signed Jenkins to perform kickoff duties, as his leg was much stronger than incumbent kicker Matt Stover's leg. During his tenure with the Ravens, he attempted 1 field goal against the Tampa Bay Buccaneers, which was blocked by Ellis Wyms. He was put on the practice squad after week 10 due to injuries. He would go on to be assigned to NFL Europe with the Berlin Thunder for the off season. He was eventually cut after the 3rd preseason game in 2003

=== Berlin Thunder ===
Jenkins was assigned to the Berlin Thunder of NFL Europe during the 2003 NFL off-season. Again, he was mostly used as a kickoff and long field goal specialist, going 6/11 on field goal attempts, making 2/4 of his attempts of 50+ yards.
