= LaVar Arrington =

American football player (born 1978)

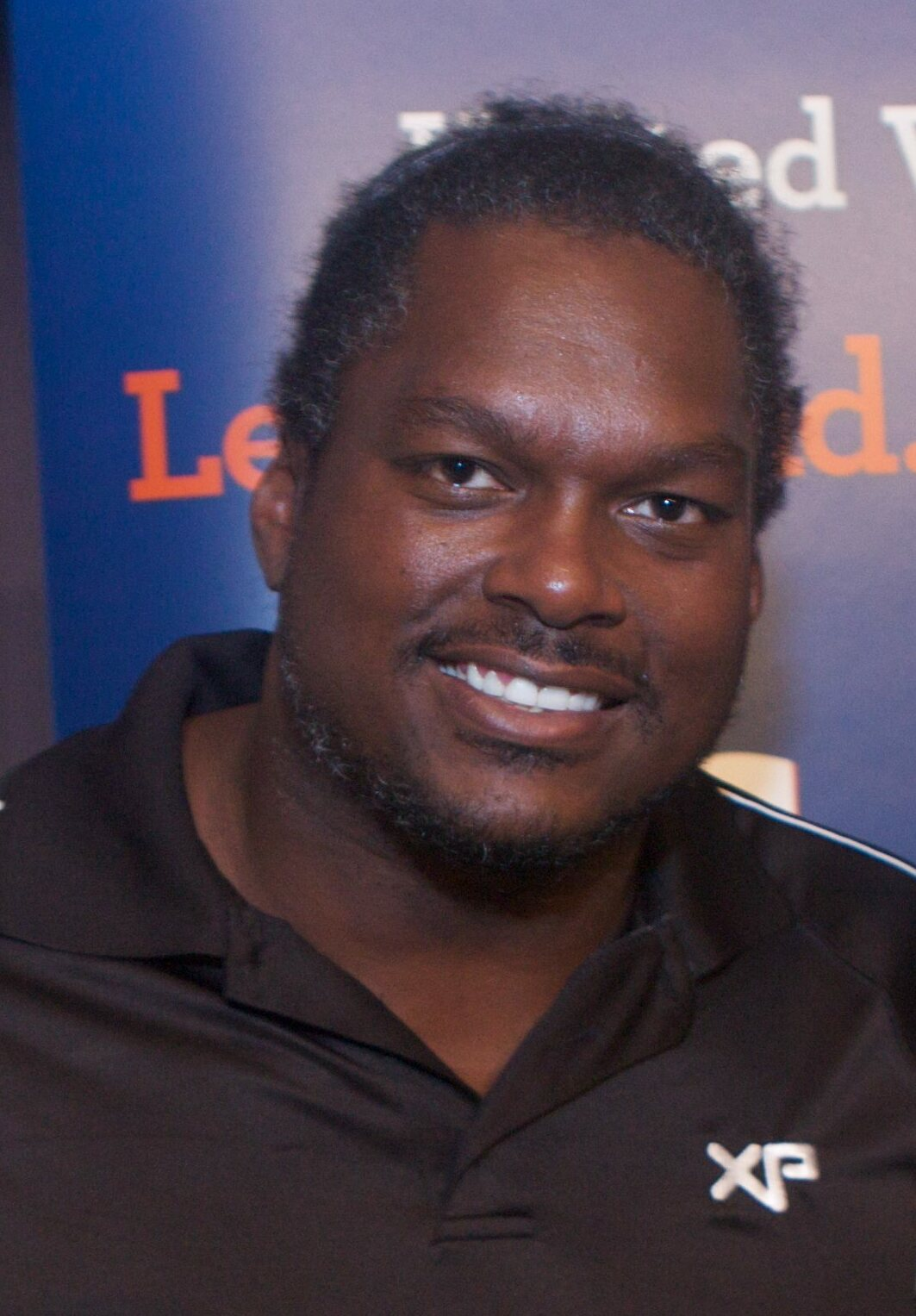
- Arrington in 2012

No. 56, 55
- Position: Linebacker

Personal information
- Born: June 20, 1978 (age 48); Pittsburgh, Pennsylvania, U.S.
- Listed height: 6 ft 3 in (1.91 m)
- Listed weight: 257 lb (117 kg)

Career information
- High school: North Hills (Pittsburgh)
- College: Penn State (1997–1999)
- NFL draft: 2000: 1st round, 2nd overall pick

Career history
- Washington Redskins (2000–2005); New York Giants (2006)

Awards and highlights
- 2× Second-team All-Pro (2001, 2003); 3× Pro Bowl (2001–2003); NFL forced fumbles co-leader (2003); PFWA All-Rookie Team (2000); Washington Commanders 90 Greatest; Chuck Bednarik Award (1999); Butkus Award (1999); Jack Lambert Trophy (1999); Unanimous All-American (1999); First-team All-American (1998); Big Ten Co-Defensive Player of the Year (1998); 2× First-team All-Big Ten (1998, 1999)

Career NFL statistics
- Tackles: 417
- Sacks: 23.5
- Safeties: 1
- Forced fumbles: 6
- Fumble recoveries: 7
- Pass deflections: 38
- Interceptions: 3
- Defensive touchdowns: 2
- Stats at Pro Football Reference
- College Football Hall of Fame

LaVar RaShad Arrington (born June 20, 1978) is an American former professional football player who was a linebacker for seven seasons in the National Football League (NFL). He played college football for the Penn State Nittany Lions and was selected with the second overall pick by the Washington Redskins of the 2000 NFL draft. He was also a member of the New York Giants.

== Early life ==
Arrington was born in Pittsburgh. He played linebacker and running back at North Hills High School in Pittsburgh. After his senior year, he was named the 1996 Parade National Player of the Year, Bobby Dodd National High School Back of the Year the Gatorade Player of the Year and USA Today Pennsylvania Player of the Year. He became the second player in Pennsylvania Class 4-A history to rush for more than 4,000 career yards, with 4,357 on 711 carries and 72 touchdowns. He played in the 1997 Big 33 Football Classic, the annual game between Pennsylvania and Ohio's best high school football players. In basketball, he was recruited to play basketball for Georgetown, UMass, and North Carolina.

Also a standout sprinter, Arrington was on the school's track and field team, where he recorded personal-best times of 10.85 seconds in the 100 meters and 23.14 seconds in the 200 meters. He also had top-jumps of 1.96 meters in the high jump and 6.76 meters in the long jump.

He was inducted into the WPIAL Hall of Fame on June 24, 2011.

== College career ==
While attending Penn State University, Arrington played for coach Joe Paterno's Nittany Lions teams from 1997 to 1999. His signature play with the Nittany Lions came during a game against Illinois. On a fourth and short yardage play, Arrington anticipated the snap count and jumped over the offensive line to tackle the runner in the backfield. The play became known as "The LaVar Leap". Arrington's tendency for spectacular plays and his cover appearance on the Sports Illustrated 1999 College Football Preview Issue led many to mention him as a possible Heisman Trophy candidate. Arrington received several honors during his college career, including the Chuck Bednarik Award, Dick Butkus Award, and Lambert Award in 1999. He was an All-Big Ten selection, a first-team All-American in 1998, and a consensus first-team All-American in 1999. Arrington finished ninth in balloting for the 1999 Heisman Trophy. He left Penn State after his junior season to enter the NFL draft.

On December 11, 2014, the Big Ten Network included Arrington on "The Mount Rushmore of Penn State Football", as chosen by online fan voting. Arrington was joined in the honor by John Cappelletti, Jack Ham, and Shane Conlan.

== Professional career ==
Pre-draft measurables
Height	Weight
6 ft 3 3/8 in (1.91 m)	250 lb (113 kg)
Values from NFL Combine

=== Washington Redskins ===
The Washington Redskins chose Arrington with the second overall pick, in the 2000 NFL draft, and he played for the Redskins from 2000 to 2005. After four seasons with the Redskins, Arrington signed an eight-year, $68 million contract extension. His agent Carl Poston was accused of neglecting to inspect the final revision of the contract, in which $6.5 million worth of bonuses contained in earlier drafts were missing. Poston was eventually suspended for two years by the National Football League Players' Association (NFLPA) over the mishandling of Arrington's contract; Arrington did not support the NFLPA's decision. Arrington's final two seasons with the Redskins was marred by knee injuries and conflicts with coaches Joe Gibbs and Gregg Williams. In March 2006 Arrington paid the Redskins $4.4 million to buy his free agency.

=== New York Giants ===
In April 2006, Arrington agreed to a seven-year, $49 million contract with the New York Giants. He was injured in week 7 against the Dallas Cowboys and missed the rest of the season with a ruptured Achilles tendon. On February 12, 2007, he was released by the New York Giants.

=== Motorcycle accident and retirement ===
Arrington's agent Kevin Poston initially stated that his client intended to play during the 2007 NFL season, saying "things could change at some point, but as of this moment LaVar is focused on playing this season."

However, on June 18, 2007, Arrington was involved in a serious motorcycle accident in suburban Maryland. He was on the Route 50 off-ramp of the Capital Beltway when he lost control of his 2007 Kawasaki Ninja ZX-14, striking a guardrail. Arrington was rushed to Prince George's Medical Center, in serious but stable condition. Arrington sustained a broken right forearm, broken lower vertebrae, and deep cuts to his leg. He was issued two citations, one for failure to control speed to avoid a collision, the other for operating a vehicle without a class license that contributed to a crash. A September 23, 2007, New York Daily News article confirmed his retirement.

=== Career statistics ===
Legend
	Led the league
**Bold**	Career high

=== Regular season ===
Year	Team	Games		Tackles					Interceptions					Fumbles			
Year	Team	GP	GS	Cmb	Solo	Ast	Sck	Sfty	Int	Yds	Lng	TD	PD	FF	FR	Yds	TD
2000	WAS	16	11	55	45	10	4.0	0	0	0	0	0	4	0	0	0	0
2001	WAS	14	14	**99**	**82**	17	0.5	0	**3**	**120**	**67**	**1**	9	0	2	0	0
2002	WAS	16	16	95	70	**25**	**11.0**	0	0	0	0	0	8	0	**3**	**1**	**1**
2003	WAS	16	16	90	77	13	6.0	0	0	0	0	0	**11**	**6**	2	-7	0
2004	WAS	4	2	15	11	4	1.0	0	0	0	0	0	2	0	0	0	0
2005	WAS	13	8	47	39	8	0.0	0	0	0	0	0	1	0	0	0	0
2006	NYG	6	5	16	14	2	1.0	**1**	0	0	0	0	3	0	0	0	0
Career		85	72	417	338	79	23.5	1	3	120	67	1	38	6	7	-6	1

== After football ==
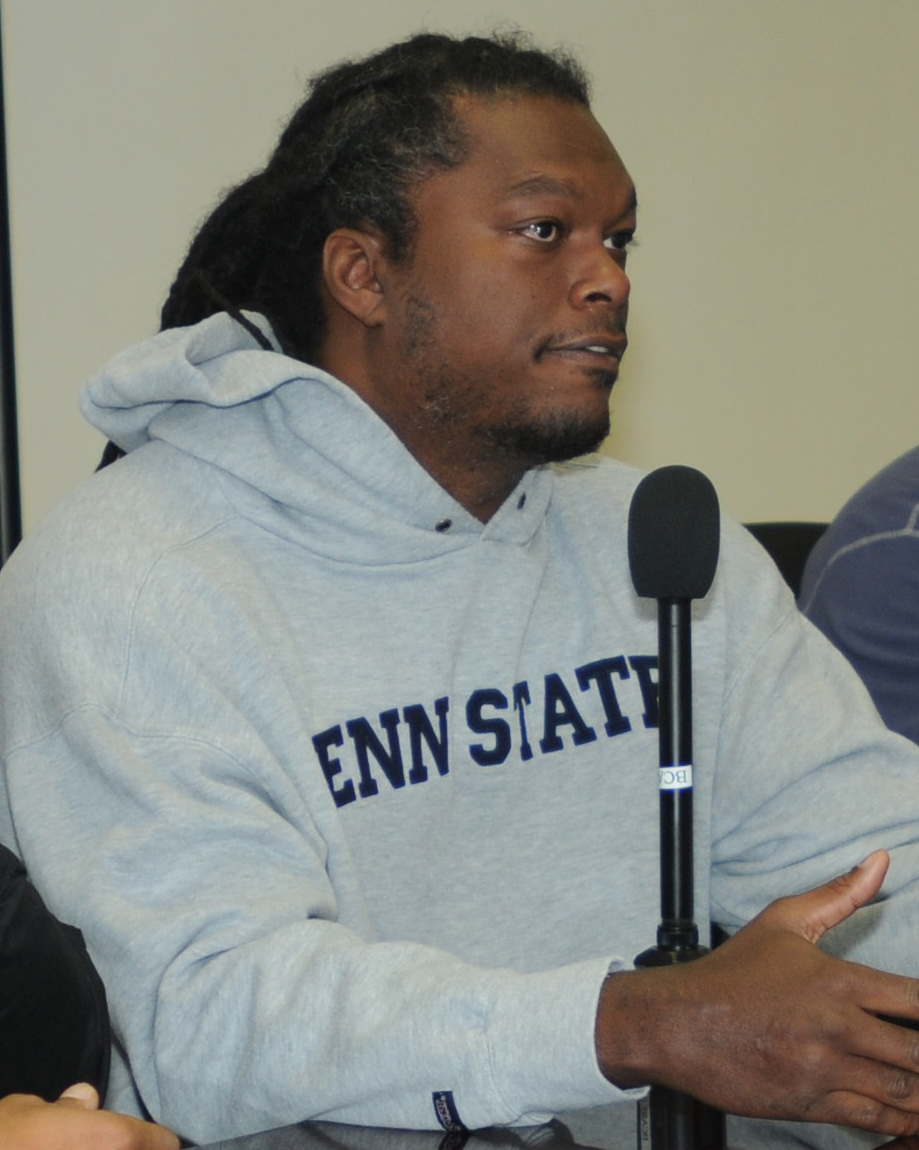
Arrington at Joint Base Balad in 2010

=== Broadcasting career ===
Arrington started working on pregame and postgame shows for Comcast SportsNet before the Redskins' 2007 season week 3 loss to the Giants. He became a permanent member of the Comcast team on October 14 for the Green Bay Packers game.

He returned to Comcast SportsNet's on-air lineup for week 3 of the 2008 NFL season, appearing on the pregame and postgame shows, and on Washington Post Live. Comcast also featured a segment entitled "Life on the Sidelines with LaVar Arrington" during its Redskins Kickoff program on game days.

Arrington did a weekday afternoon radio talk show in Washington, DC with DJ Chad Dukes, titled "The LaVar Arrington Show with Chad Dukes." The inaugural show aired on July 20, 2009, on 106.7 The Fan. He also hosts his own weekly sports show titled "SportsWeek with Lavar Arrington" on local Washington television station DC50.

On July 10, 2014, it was announced that Arrington would be joining NFL Network's NFL AM program.

In 2019 Arrington began working as a football analyst on FS1 on the "Speak For Yourself" sports talk program.

In September 2021, Arrington teamed up with Brady Quinn and Jonas Knox for "2 Pros and a Cup of Joe," Fox Sports Radio's morning drive show.

=== Entrepreneurship ===
Arrington formed a sports agency, Leap Management, LLC, in 2008. The firm's first clients were 2009 NFL draft prospects Aaron Maybin, Derrick Williams, Josh Gaines, and Tyrell Sales.

Arrington founded Xtreme Procision (XP) in 2010, a state-of-the-art football training system aimed at developing the world's next generation of football players. Xtreme Procision offers football training camps nationwide, as well as football training products with visual target zones to aid in accelerating development.

== Personal life ==
LaVar Arrington was named after LeVar Burton, following the actor's portrayal of Kunta Kinte in the 1977 television miniseries Roots. He has an older brother, Michael, who played basketball at Slippery Rock University and a younger brother, Eric. His father, Michael, became an ordained minister after he retired from the military. His mother, Carolyn, is a special education teacher in the Pittsburgh public school system. Arrington lives in Los Angeles County, California with his wife Trishia. The couple have four children, including LaVar Arrington II.

Arrington opened a restaurant named The Sideline in Landover, Maryland on January 30, 2008. In March 2009 one man was killed and six other people were injured after an argument ended in a burst of gunfire just outside the main entrance to the restaurant. The restaurant went bankrupt and closed in December 2009.

Arrington appeared in several television commercials for Eastern Motors with fellow athletes Carmelo Anthony, Clinton Portis, Sean Taylor, and Antawn Jamison. He appeared on a 2002 episode of the TLC program While You Were Out, where he helped redesign a room for his brother, Michael. Arrington served as a judge for ESPN's Dream Job.
