= James Williams (wide receiver) =

American football player (born 1978)

No. 88, 16
- Position: Wide receiver

Personal information
- Born: March 6, 1978 (age 48); Vicksburg, Mississippi, U.S.
- Listed height: 5 ft 10 in (1.78 m)
- Listed weight: 186 lb (84 kg)

Career information
- High school: Warren Central (Vicksburg)
- College: Marshall
- NFL draft: 2000: 6th round, 175th overall pick

Career history
- Seattle Seahawks (2000–2002); Detroit Lions (2003); Tampa Bay Buccaneers (2004)*
- * Offseason or practice squad member only

Awards and highlights
- First-team All-MAC (1999)

Career NFL statistics
- Receptions: 29
- Receiving touchdowns: 410
- Receiving touchdowns: 1
- Stats at Pro Football Reference

James L. Williams (born March 6, 1978) is an American former professional football player who was a wide receiver in the National Football League (NFL). He played college football for the Marshall Thundering Herd. Williams was selected by the Seattle Seahawks in the sixth round of the 2000 NFL draft and also played for the Detroit Lions.

== NFL career statistics ==
Legend
| **Bold** | Career high |

| Year | Team | Games | | Receiving | | | | | |
| Year | Team | GP | GS | Tgt | Rec | Yds | Avg | Lng | TD |
|---|---|---|---|---|---|---|---|---|---|
| 2000 | SEA | 10 | 0 | 16 | 8 | 99 | 12.4 | 18 | 0 |
| 2001 | SEA | 6 | **2** | 17 | **12** | **212** | **17.7** | **49** | **1** |
| 2002 | SEA | **13** | **2** | **20** | 9 | 99 | 11.0 | 18 | 0 |
| 2003 | DET | 1 | 0 | 1 | 0 | 0 | 0.0 | 0 | 0 |
| | | 30 | 4 | 54 | 29 | 410 | 14.1 | 49 | 1 |

Pre-draft measurables
| Height | Weight | Arm length | Hand span | 40-yard dash | 10-yard split | 20-yard split | 20-yard shuttle | Three-cone drill | Vertical jump | Broad jump |
|---|---|---|---|---|---|---|---|---|---|---|
| 5 ft 10 7/8 in (1.80 m) | 180 lb (82 kg) | 30 1/2 in (0.77 m) | 9 5/8 in (0.24 m) | 4.51 s | 1.57 s | 2.64 s | 4.16 s | 7.22 s | 36.0 in (0.91 m) | 10 ft 3 in (3.12 m) |
All values from NFL Combine

== See also ==
- List of NCAA major college football yearly receiving leaders
