= Demographics of South Carolina =

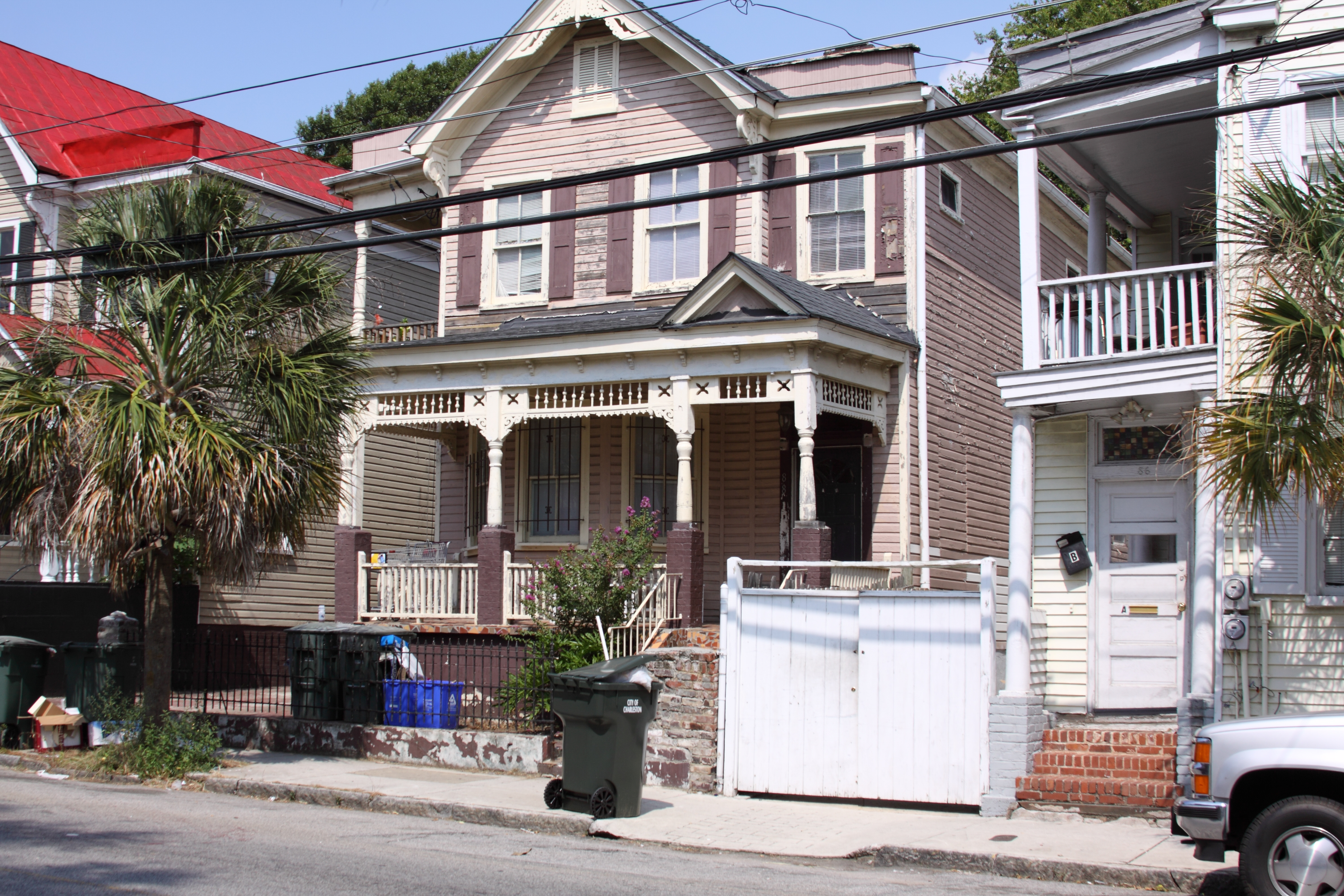
Columbus Street, Charleston, South Carolina

The U.S. state of South Carolina is located in the Southern United States. It is the 23rd largest state by population, with a population of 5,118,425 according to 2020 United States Census estimates.

== Demographics ==
Historical population
Census	Pop.	Note	%±
1790	249,073		—
1800	345,591		38.8%
1810	415,115		20.1%
1820	502,741		21.1%
1830	581,185		15.6%
1840	594,398		2.3%
1850	668,507		12.5%
1860	703,708		5.3%
1870	705,606		0.3%
1880	995,577		41.1%
1890	1,151,149		15.6%
1900	1,340,316		16.4%
1910	1,515,400		13.1%
1920	1,683,724		11.1%
1930	1,738,765		3.3%
1940	1,899,804		9.3%
1950	2,117,027		11.4%
1960	2,382,594		12.5%
1970	2,590,516		8.7%
1980	3,121,820		20.5%
1990	3,486,703		11.7%
2000	4,012,012		15.1%
2010	4,625,384		15.3%
2020	5,118,425		10.7%
2025 (est.)	5,570,274		8.8%
Source: 1910–2020, 2025

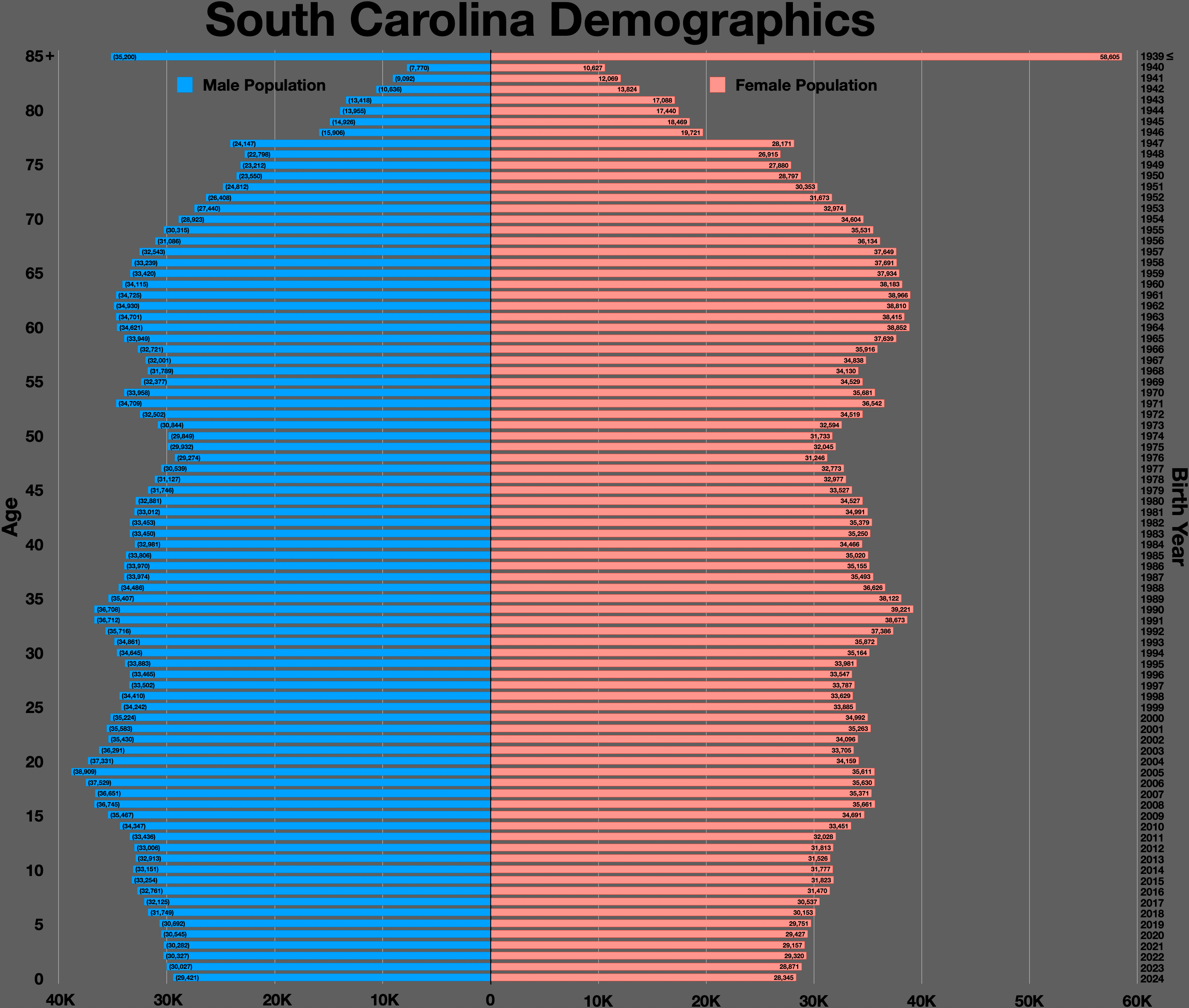
South Carolina population pyramid

South Carolina's center of population is 2.4 mi (3.9 km) north of the State House in the city of Columbia.

According to the United States Census Bureau, as of 2020, South Carolina had an estimated population of 5,118,425, which is an increase of 493,041, or 10.7%, since the year 2010.

According to the University of South Carolina's Arnold School of Public Health, Consortium for Latino Immigration Studies, South Carolina's foreign-born population grew faster than any other state between 2000 and 2005. The Consortium reports that the number of Hispanics in South Carolina is greatly undercounted by census enumerators and may be more than 400,000.

Demographics of South Carolina (csv)
By race	White	Black	AIAN*	Asian	NHPI*
2000 (total population)	68.88%	30.01%	0.69%	1.13%	0.10%
2000 (Hispanic only)	2.05%	0.26%	0.05%	0.03%	0.02%
2005 (total population)	69.12%	29.68%	0.69%	1.31%	0.10%
2005 (Hispanic only)	2.95%	0.27%	0.06%	0.04%	0.02%
Growth 2000–05 (total population)	6.43%	4.89%	6.09%	23.49%	13.76%
Growth 2000–05 (non-Hispanic only)	5.01%	4.87%	4.61%	23.16%	10.36%
Growth 2000–05 (Hispanic only)	52.78%	7.64%	23.97%	34.25%	26.89%
* AIAN is American Indian or Alaskan Native; NHPI is Native Hawaiian or Pacific Islander

South Carolina's population increased by 15.4 percent between 1990 and 2000 and by another 7.4 percent between 2000 and 2005; 11.6 percent of that increase has been attributed to immigration, primarily from Mexico and Latin America. Most work in the construction industry, with another proportion in agriculture, in addition to processing factories. The Latino population has increased considerably faster in South Carolina and the Southeast than for the United States as a whole.

From 1720 until 1920, African slaves and their descendants made up a majority of the state's population. (See census data below.) Whites became a majority in the state after that date, following the migration of tens of thousands of blacks to northern industrial cities in the Great Migration. In the 21st century, most of the African-American population in the state lives in the Lowcountry and the Midlands areas, historically areas of their greatest concentrations of population.

6.6% of South Carolina's total population were reported as under 5 years old, 25.2% under 18, and 12.1% were 65 or older. Females made up approximately 51.4% of the population in 2000. Those who self-identify as having American ancestry are of mostly British Isles ancestry: English and Scots-Irish stock.

Barbadian slaves were brought to South Carolina.

French Huguenots immigrated to the state.

The Catawba, Pee Dee, Chicora, Edisto, Santee, Yamassee, and Chicora-Waccamaw tribes are all still present in the state.

=== Births data ===
Note: Births in table do not add up, because Hispanics are counted both by their ethnicity and by their race, giving a higher overall number.

Live Births by Single Race/Ethnicity of Mother
Race	2014	2015	2016	2017	2018	2019	2020	2021	2022	2023	2024
White	33,639 (58.4%)	33,927 (58.4%)	32,929 (57.4%)	32,283 (56.6%)	31,890 (56.3%)	31,660 (55.5%)	30,465 (54.7%)	31,841 (55.7%)	32,323 (55.9%)	31,884 (55.2%)	32,336 (55.0%)
Black	18,598 (32.3%)	18,577 (32.0%)	16,527 (28.8%)	16,851 (29.5%)	16,681 (29.4%)	16,802 (29.5%)	16,309 (29.3%)	16,009 (28.0%)	15,333 (26.5%)	14,746 (25.5%)	14,387 (24.5%)
Asian	1,293 (2.2%)	1,289 (2.2%)	1,134 (2.0%)	1,125 (2.0%)	1,172 (2.1%)	1,155 (2.0%)	1,148 (2.1%)	1,167 (2.0%)	1,176 (2.0%)	1,186 (2.0%)	1,275 (2.1%)
American Indian	193 (0.3%)	217 (0.4%)	151 (0.3%)	183 (0.3%)	156 (0.3%)	176 (0.3%)	106 (0.2%)	122 (0.2%)	124 (0.2%)	150 (0.2%)	122 (0.2%)
Hispanic (any race)	4,646 (8.1%)	4,942 (8.5%)	5,135 (8.9%)	5,221 (9.2%)	5,255 (9.3%)	5,741 (10.1%)	5,993 (10.7%)	6,386 (11.2%)	7,073 (12.2%)	7,957 (13.8%)	8,893 (15.1%)
Total	57,627 (100%)	58,139 (100%)	57,342 (100%)	57,029 (100%)	56,669 (100%)	57,038 (100%)	55,704 (100%)	57,185 (100%)	57,820 (100%)	57,729 (100%)	58,768 (100%)

- Since 2016, data for births of White Hispanic origin are not collected, but included in one Hispanic group; persons of Hispanic origin may be of any race.
- NH = Non-Hispanic

== Vital statistics ==
Year	Population	Live births	Deaths	Natural change	Crude birth rate (per 1,000)	Crude death rate (per 1,000)	Natural change (per 1,000)	Crude migration change (per 1,000)
2000	4,024,223	56,114	36,948	19,166	13.9	9.2	4.7	
2001	4,064,995	55,756	36,612	19,144	13.7	9.0	4.7	5.3
2002	4,107,795	54,570	37,736	16,834	13.3	9.2	4.1	6.3
2003	4,150,297	55,649	38,112	17,537	13.4	9.2	4.2	6.0
2004	4,210,921	56,590	37,276	19,314	13.4	8.9	4.5	9.8
2005	4,270,150	57,711	38,707	19,004	13.5	9.1	4.4	9.4
2006	4,357,847	62,171	38,761	23,410	14.3	8.9	5.4	14.8
2007	4,444,110	62,875	39,439	23,436	14.1	8.9	5.2	14.1
2008	4,528,996	63,071	40,289	22,782	13.9	8.9	5.0	13.7
2009	4,589,872	60,620	40,449	20,171	13.2	8.8	4.4	8.9
2010	4,633,669	58,342	41,614	16,728	12.6	9.0	3.6	5.8
2011	4,661,744	57,393	42,072	15,321	12.3	9.0	3.3	2.7
2012	4,699,358	57,155	43,198	13,957	12.2	9.2	3.0	5.0
2013	4,738,067	56,795	44,582	12,213	12.0	9.4	2.6	5.6
2014	4,789,723	57,627	45,454	12,173	12.0	9.5	2.5	8.2
2015	4,850,136	58,139	47,198	10,941	12.0	9.7	2.3	10.2
2016	4,908,404	57,342	48,130	9,212	11.7	9.8	1.9	10.0
2017	4,963,742	57,029	49,441	7,588	11.5	10.0	1.5	9.6
2018	5,019,607	56,669	50,640	6,029	11.3	10.1	1.2	9.9
2019	5,076,874	57,038	50,962	6,076	11.2	10.0	1.2	10.1
2020	5,131,992	55,704	61,223	-5,519	10.9	11.9	-1.0	11.8
2021	5,194,346	57,185	65,422	-8,237	11.0	12.6	-1.6	13.6
2022	5,288,957	57,820	61,052	-3,232	10.9	11.5	-0.6	18.5
2023	5,390,798	57,729	58,012	-283	10.7	10.8	-0.1	18.9
2024	5,490,316	58,768	58,235	533	10.7	10.6	0.1	18.0
2025	5,570,274	59,361	59,072	289	10.7	10.6	0.1	14.3

== Center of population ==
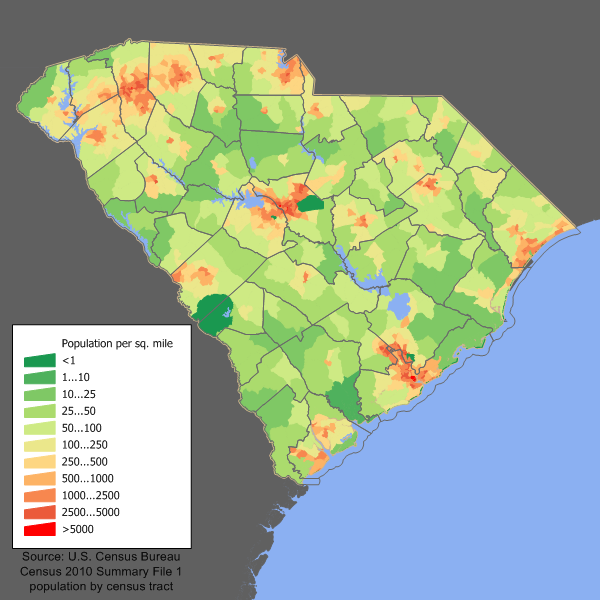
South Carolina Population Density in 2010.

=== Most populous counties ===
County	Seat	2000 Population	2010 Population	2017 Population
Greenville	Greenville	379,616	451,225	506,837
Richland	Columbia	320,667	384,504	411,592
Charleston	Charleston	309,969	350,209	401,438
Horry	Conway	196,629	269,291	333,268
Spartanburg	Spartanburg	253,431	284,307	306,854
Lexington	Lexington	216,014	254,920	290,642
York	York	164,614	229,073	266,439
Berkeley	Moncks Corner	142,651	177,843	217,937
Anderson	Anderson	165,740	187,126	198,759
Beaufort	Beaufort	120,937	162,233	186,844

=== Cities and towns ===
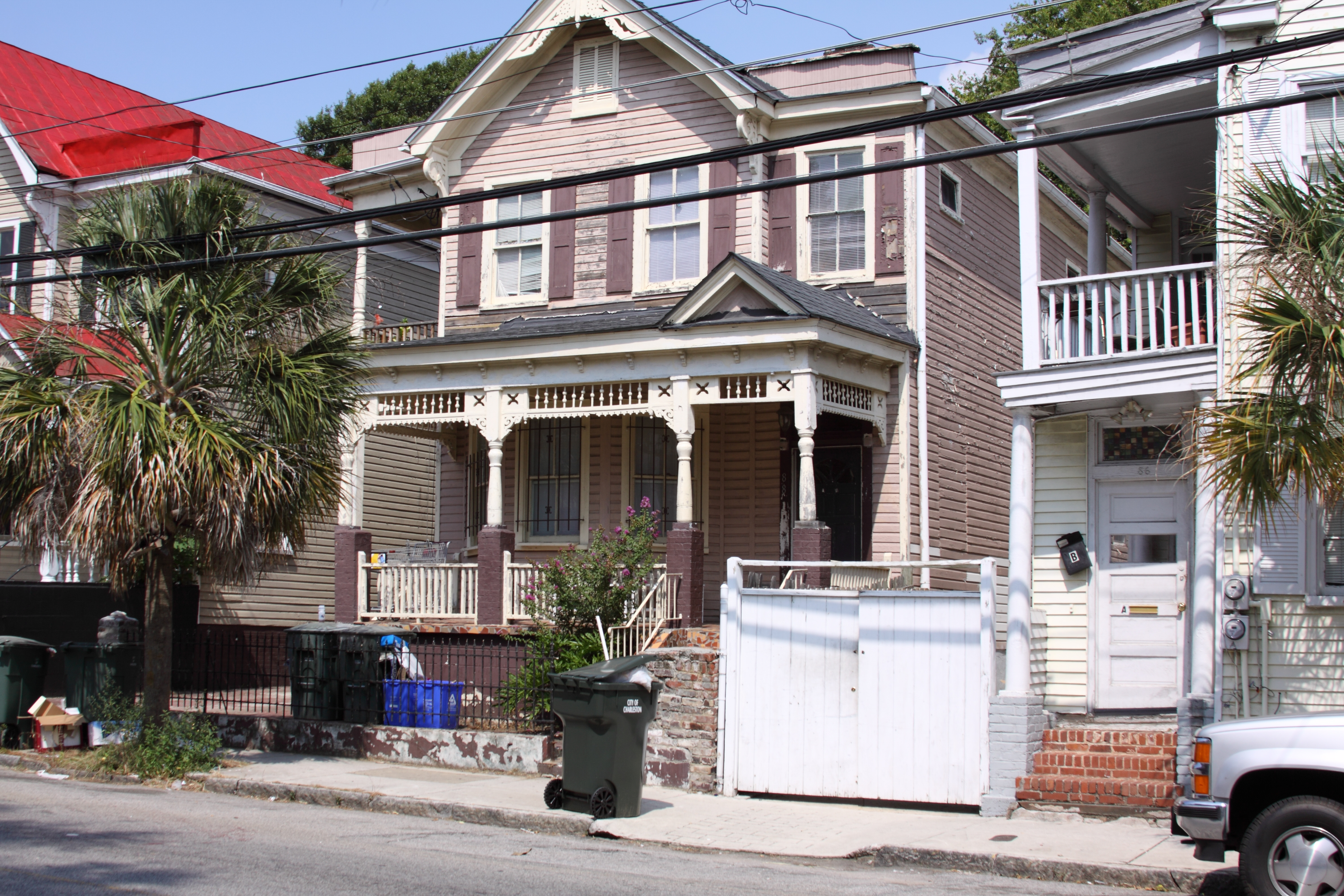
Charleston – Columbus Street

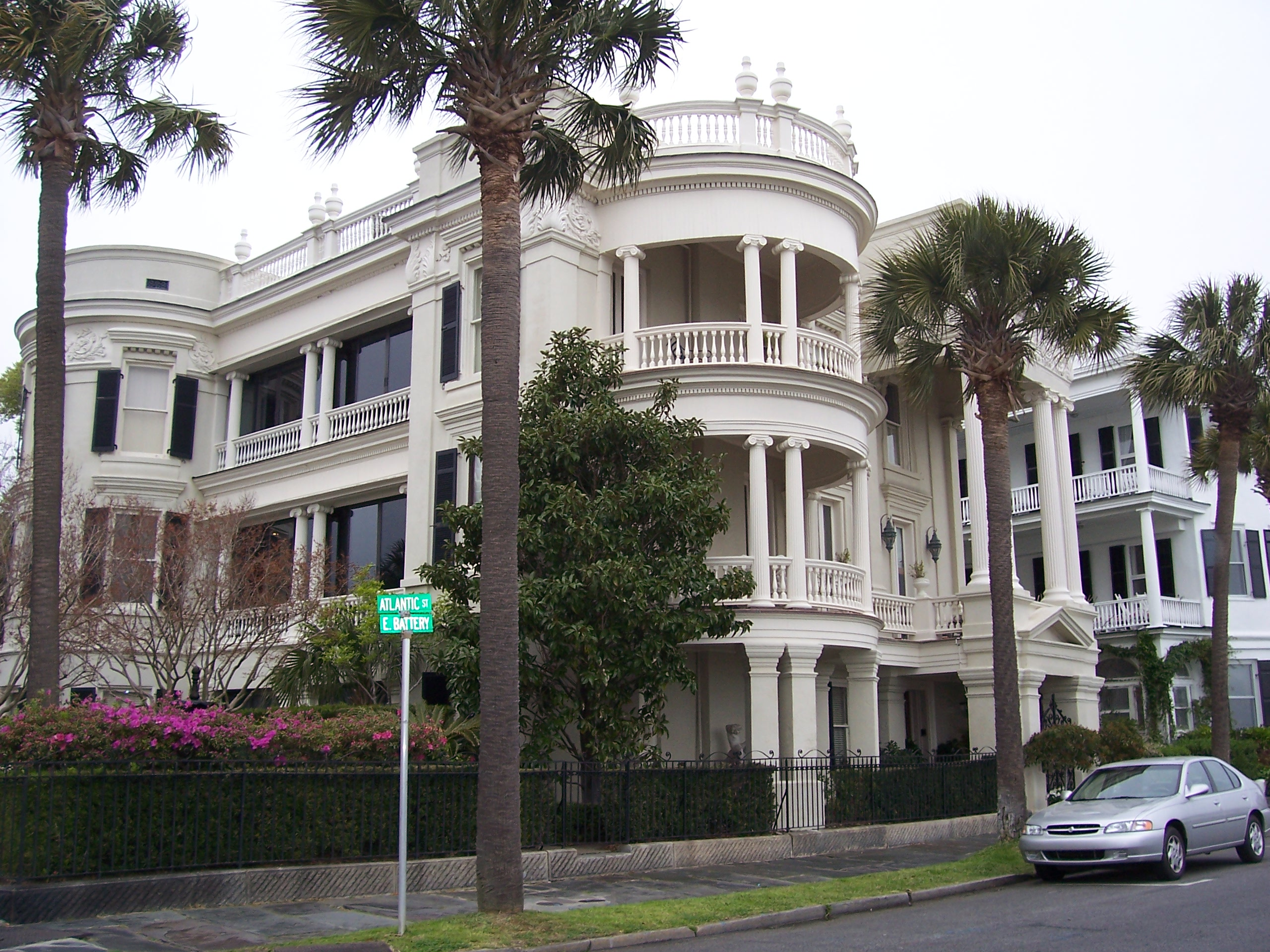
Charleston – Atlantic Street at E. Battery Street

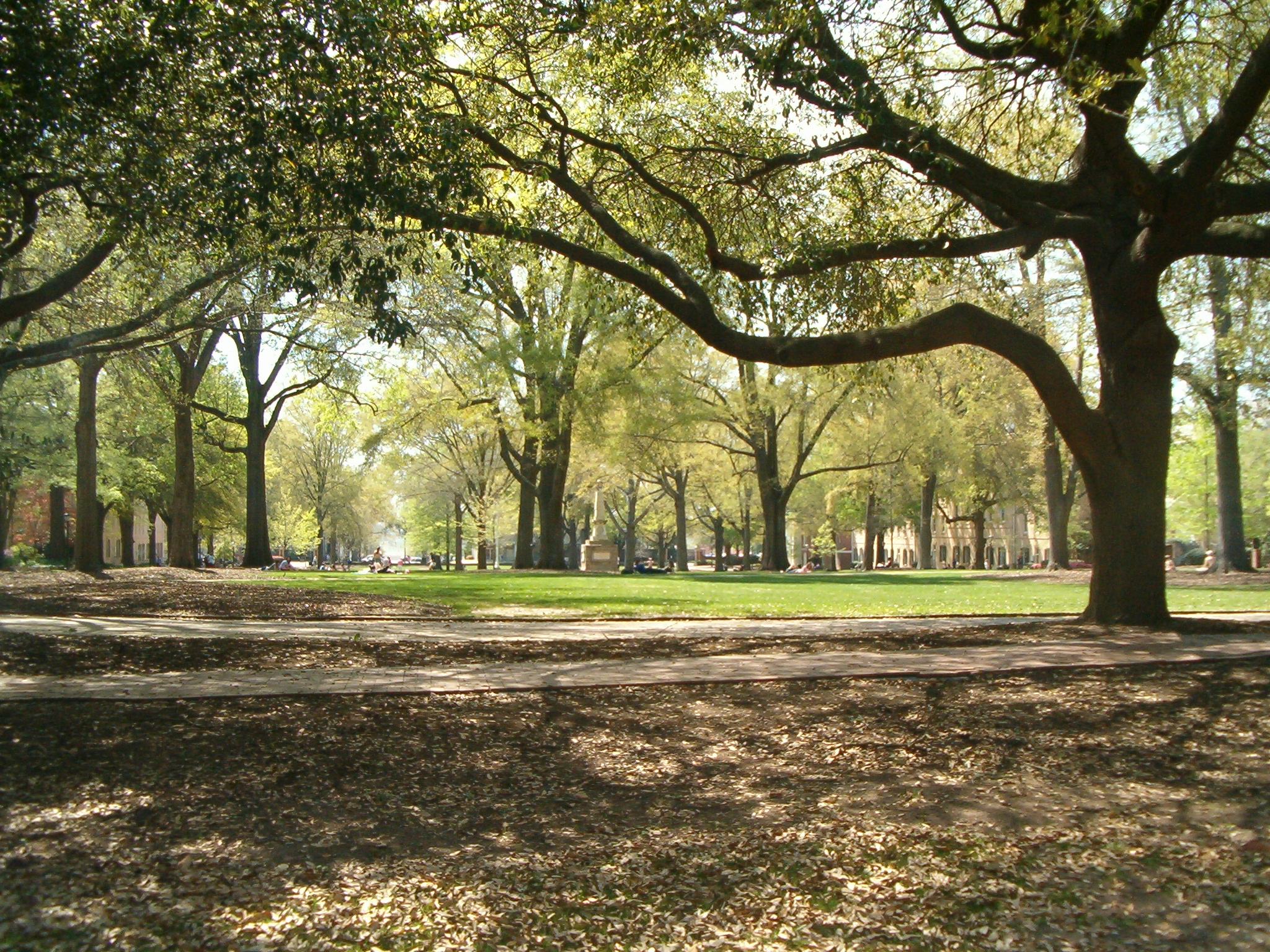
Columbia – USC Horseshoe – listed on National Register of Historic Places

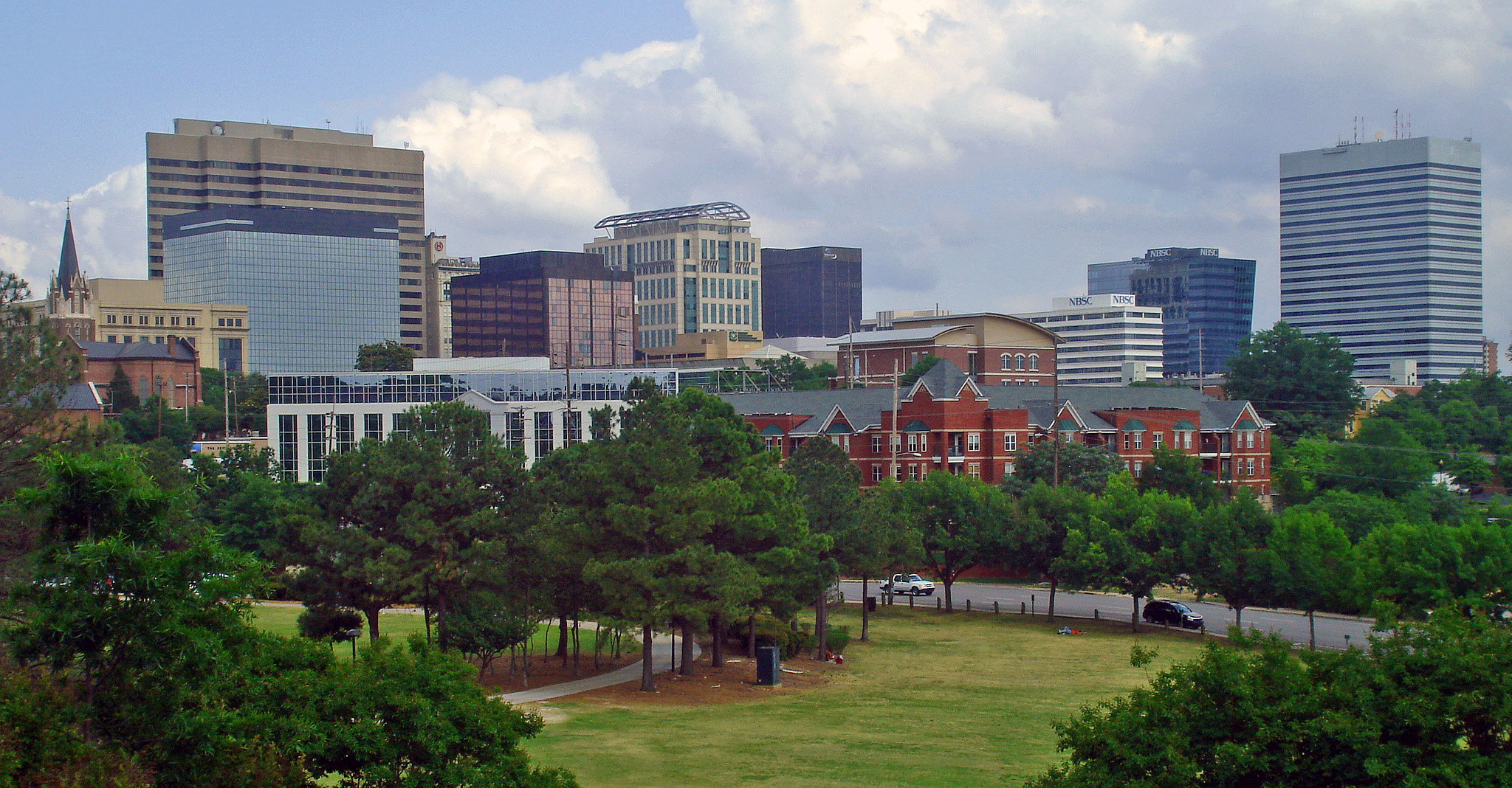
Columbia – Skyline from Arsenal Hill

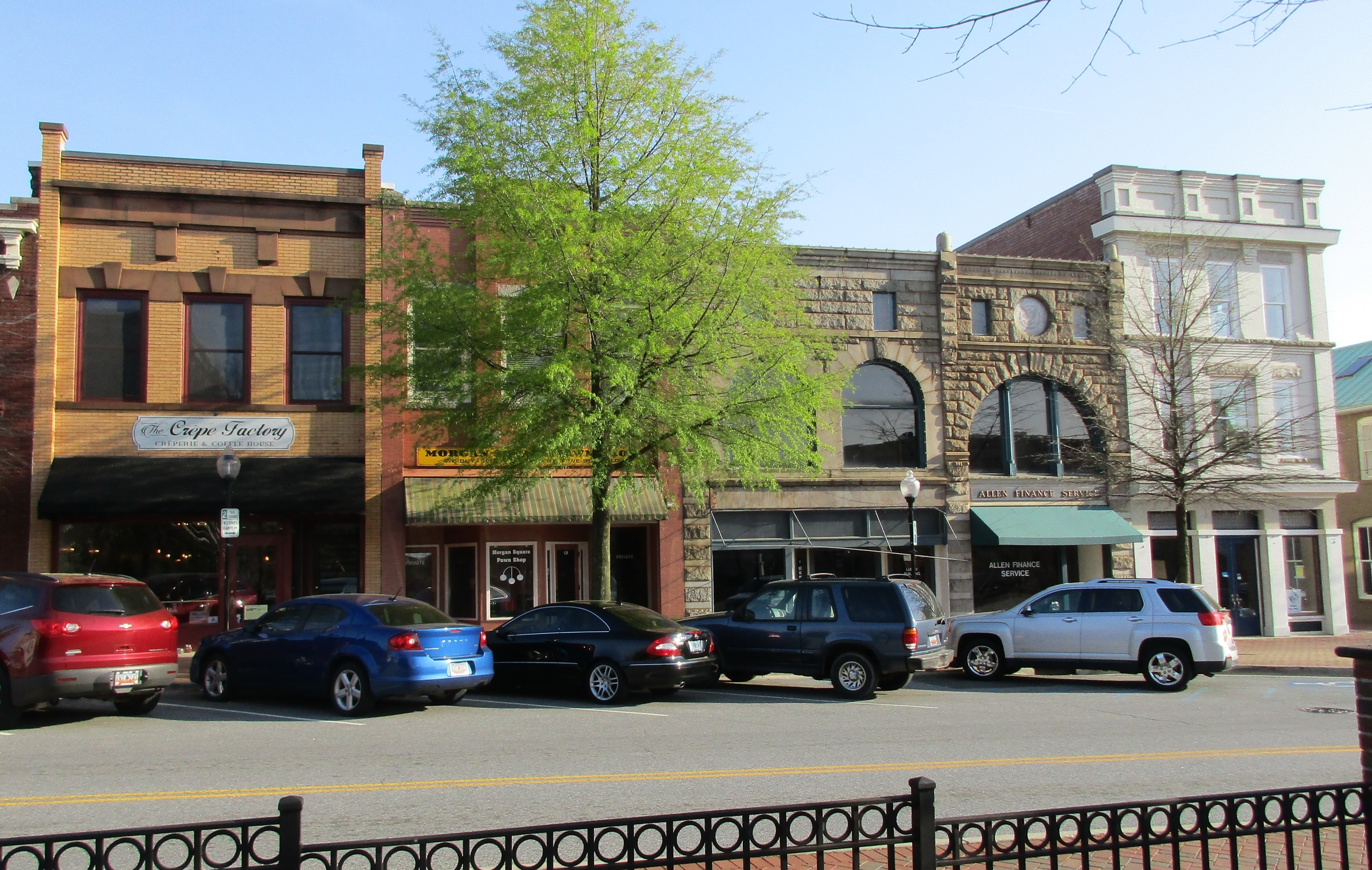
Spartanburg – Historical buildings on West Main

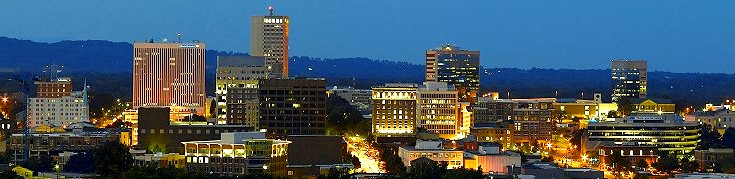
Greenville – Skyline by night

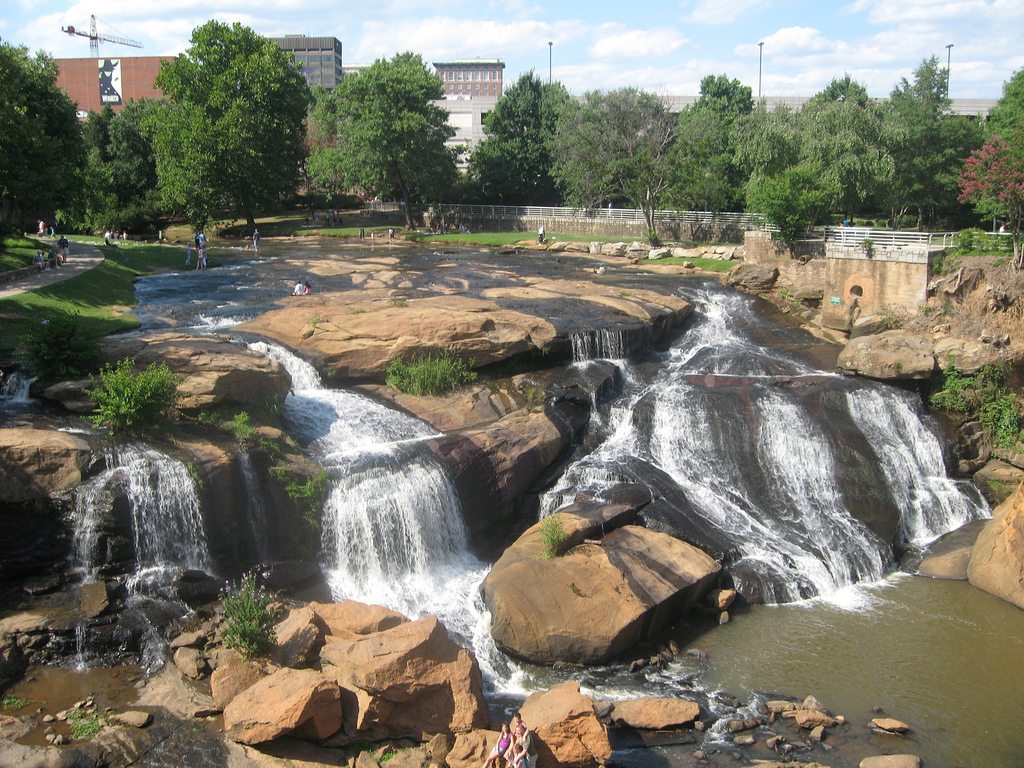
Greenville – Falls in Downtown area.

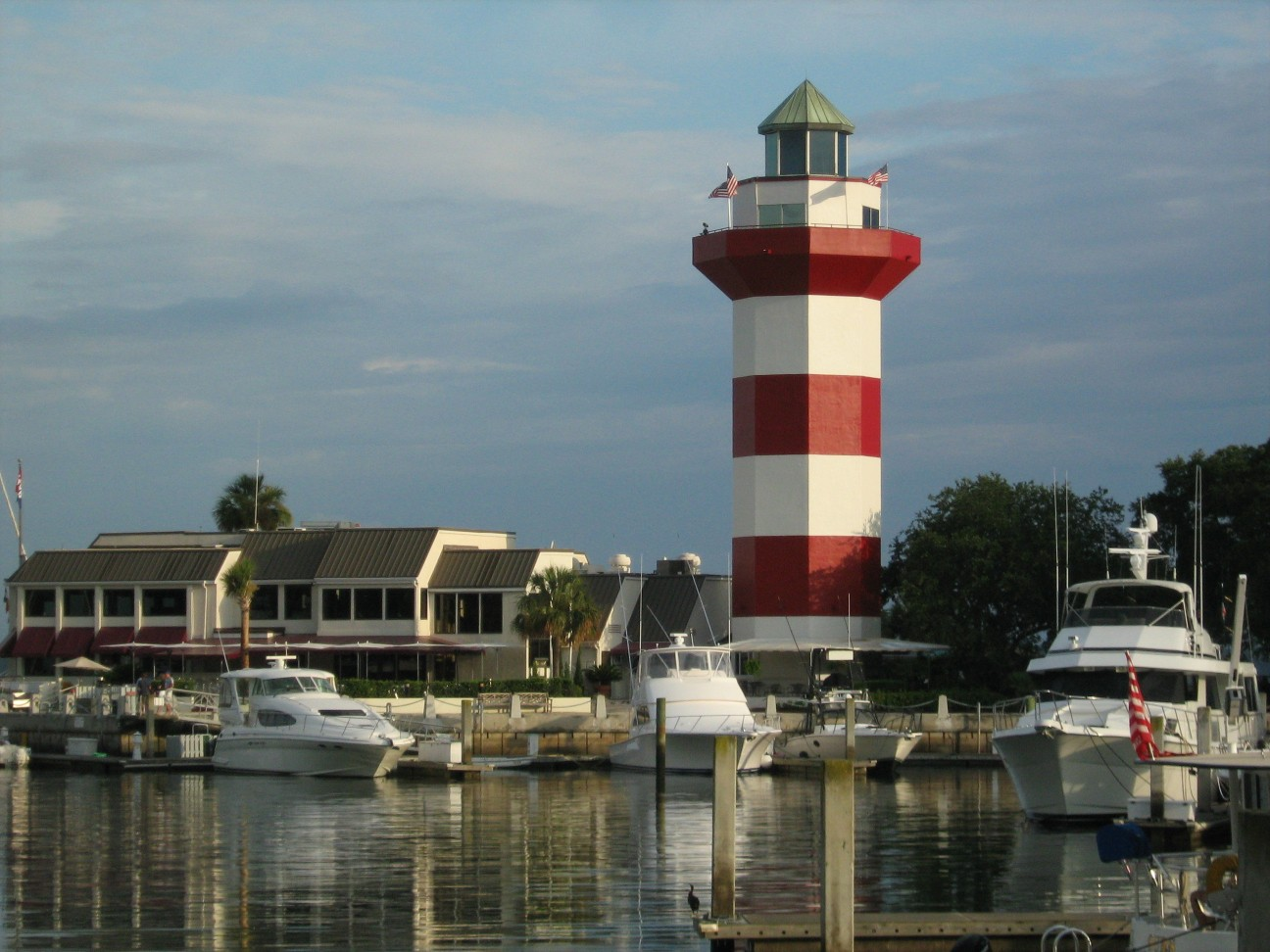
Hilton Head Island – Harbour Town

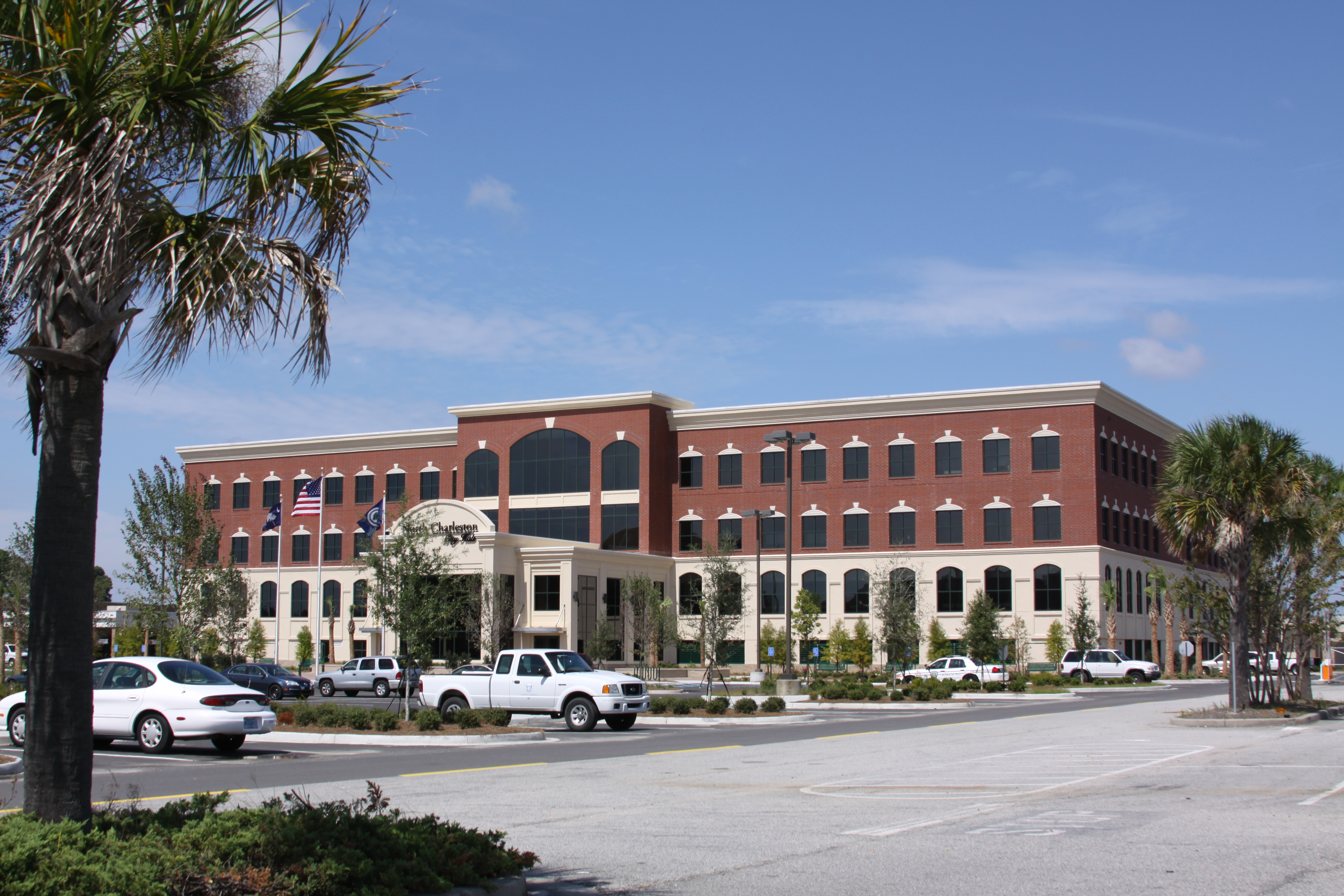
North Charleston – City Hall

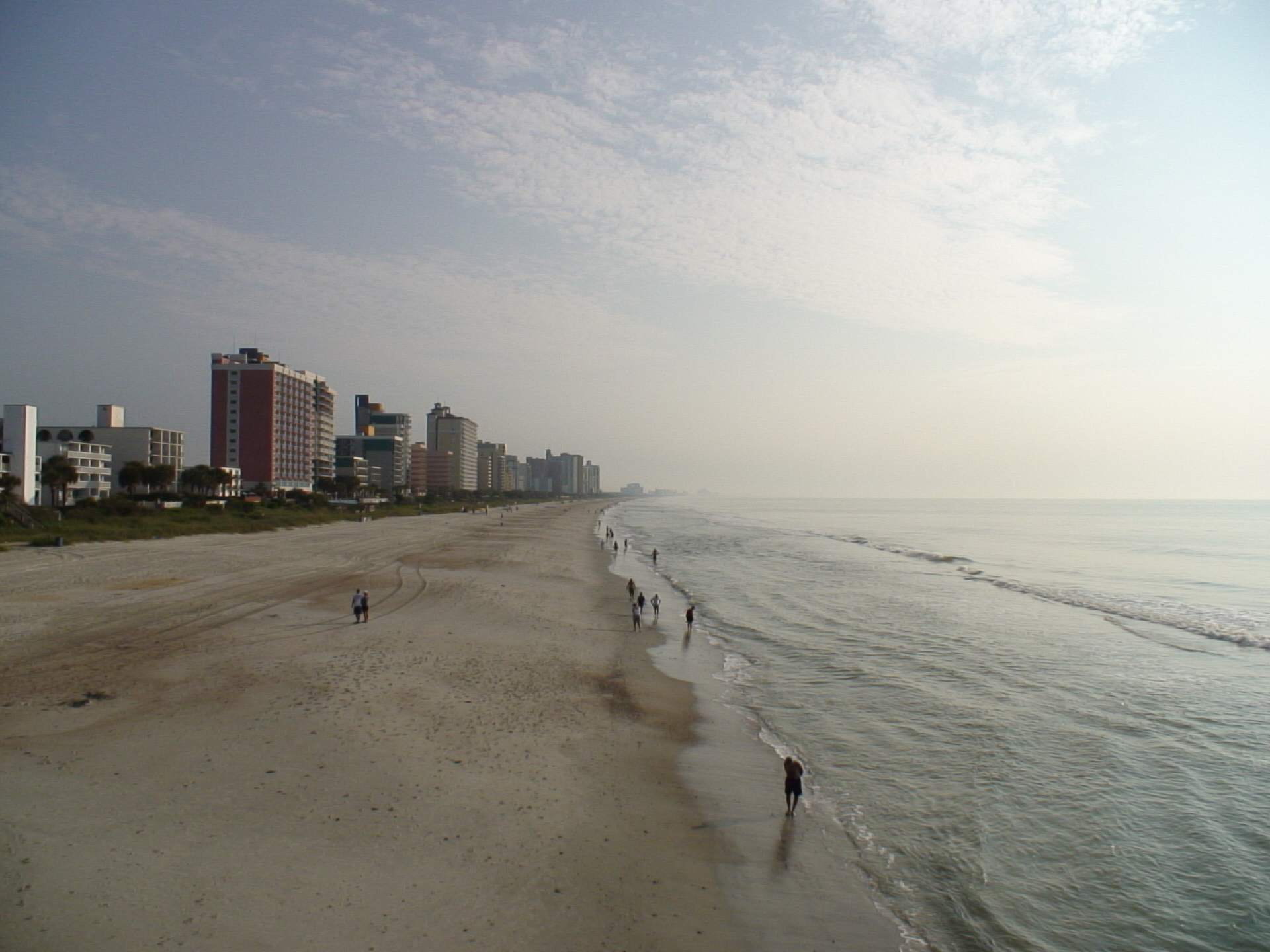
Myrtle Beach

=== Largest municipalities ===
Population estimates as of 2010.

- Columbia – 129,272
- Charleston – 120,083
- North Charleston – 97,471
- Mount Pleasant – 67,843
- Rock Hill – 66,154
- Greenville – 73,758
- Summerville – 43,392
- Sumter- 40,524
- Hilton Head Island – 37,099
- Florence – 37,056
- Spartanburg – 37,013
- Goose Creek – 35,938
- Aiken – 29,524
- Myrtle Beach – 27,109
- Anderson – 26,686
- Greer – 25,515
- Greenwood – 23,222
- Mauldin – 22,889
- North Augusta – 21,348
- Easley – 19,993

=== City and MSAs ===
South Carolina's metropolitan statistical areas (MSAs) are much larger than their central city population counts suggest. South Carolina law makes it difficult for municipalities to annex unincorporated areas, so city proper populations look smaller than is reflected in the total metropolitan populations.

For example, Myrtle Beach has a municipal population of less than 50,000 persons, but its MSA has more than 200,000 persons. Anderson's municipal population is smaller than Sumter's, but the Anderson MSA is larger, as seen below.

Columbia, Charleston, and Greenville all have urbanized area populations between 400,000 and 550,000, while their metropolitan statistical area (MSA) populations are each more than 600,000. The Greenville-Spartanburg-Anderson MSA population consists of approximately 1.4 million people, making it the largest in the state and third largest in the Carolinas.

=== Urban Area Population ===
As of 2010:

- Columbia – 549,777
- Charleston/North Charleston - 548,404
- Greenville – 400,492
- Myrtle Beach – 215,304
- Spartanburg – 180,786
- Mauldin/Simpsonville - 120,577
- Rock Hill – 104,996
- Florence – 89,557
- Anderson – 75,702
- Sumter – 73,107
- Hilton Head Island - 68,998

== Religion ==
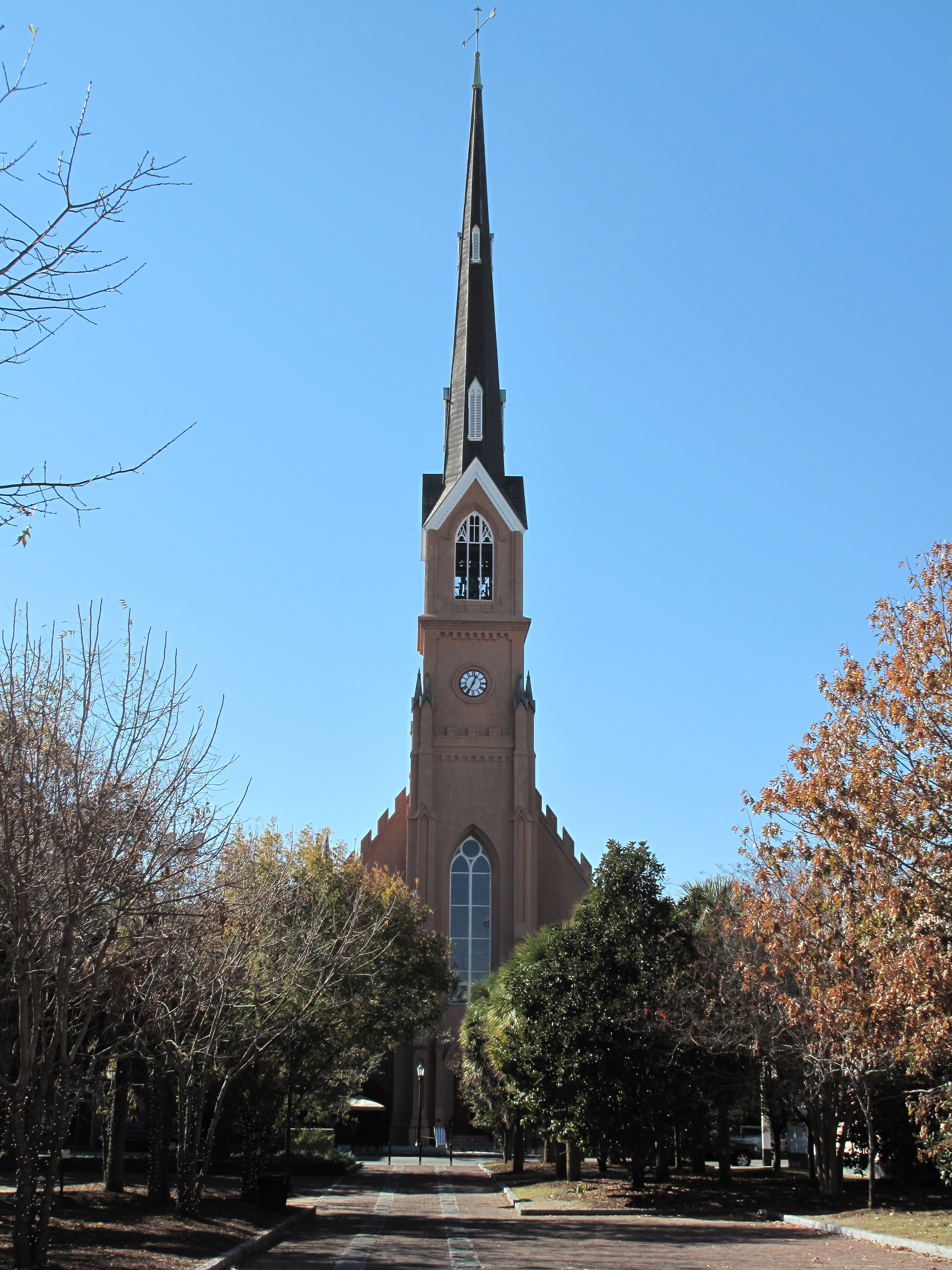
St. Matthew's German Evangelical Lutheran Church in Charleston is the tallest house of worship in the state. Its spire rises 255 feet.

South Carolina residents are majority Protestant Christian, with a lower percentage of people claiming no religious affiliation than the national average. The religious affiliations of the people of South Carolina are as follows:

- Christian: 78%
  - Protestant: 65%
    - Evangelical (e.g., Southern Baptist Convention): 35%
    - Mainline Protestant (e.g., United Methodist Church): 15%
    - Historically Black (e.g., African Methodist Episcopal Church): 15%
  - Roman Catholic: 10%
  - Other Christian: 3%
- Other Religions: 3%
- Non-Religious: 19%

Sephardic Jews have lived in the state for more than 300 years, especially in and around Charleston. Many came from London, where they were merchants. Until about 1830, South Carolina had the largest population of Jews in North America, most in Charleston. Some have married and assimilated into Christian society; in the 21st century, less than 1% of the total religiously affiliated people are Jewish. The proportion of Roman Catholics in the state has been increasing given migrants from the North and immigration from Latin America.

== Historical demographics ==
Beginning in 1790, the United States Census Bureau collected the population statistics of South Carolina. The years listed prior to that are estimates and exclude the Native American population. From 1790 until 1860, the designated demographic classifications were white, black slave and free black.

View source data.

Following the Civil War, the racial groupings were white, black and other.

View source data.

The following is a list of census data for the state of South Carolina:

Census Year	Demographic	Population	% of Pop.	% Growth
1670	White	140	90.3%	–
1670	Slave	15	9.7%	–
1670	Total	155	100%	-
1680	White	1,000	83.3%	+614.3%
1680	Slave	200	16.7%	+1233.3%
1680	Total	1,200	100%	+674.2%
1700	White	3,100	56.4%	+210.0%
1700	Slave	2,400	43.6%	+1100.0%
1700	Total	5,500	100%	+358.3%
1708	White	4,080	42.6%	+31.6%
1708	Black Slaves	4,100	42.8%	–
1708	Indian Slaves	1,400	14.6%	–
1708	Total	9,580	100%	+74.2%
1720	White	6,500	35.1%	+59.3%
1720	Slave	12,000	64.9%	+118.2%
1720	Total	18,500	100%	+93.1%
1730	White	10,000	33.3%	+53.9%
1730	Slave	20,000	66.7%	+66.7%
1730	Total	30,000	100%	+62.2%
1740	White	20,000	33.3%	+100.0%
1740	Slave	40,000	66.7%	+100.0%
1740	Total	60,000	100%	+100.0%
1750	White	21,667	33.3%	+8.3%
1750	Slave	43,333	66.7%	+8.3%
1750	Total	65,000	100%	+8.3%
1760	White	32,000	38.1%	+47.7%
1760	Slave	52,000	61.9%	+20.0%
1760	Total	84,000	100%	+29.2%
1770	White	50,000	38.5%	+56.3%
1770	Slave	80,000	61.5%	+53.9%
1770	Total	130,000	100%	+54.7%
1780	White	83,000	46.1%	+66.0%
1780	Slave	97,000	53.9%	+21.3%
1780	Total	180,000	100%	+38.5%
1790	White	140,178	56.3%	+68.9%
1790	Slave	107,094	43.0%	+10.4%
1790	Free Black	1,801	0.7%	–
1790	Total	249,073	100%	+38.4%
1800	White	196,255	56.8%	+40.0%
1800	Slave	146,151	42.3%	+36.5%
1800	Free Black	3,185	0.9%	+76.9%
1800	Total	345,591	100%	+38.8%
1810	White	214,196	51.6%	+9.1%
1810	Slave	196,365	47.3%	+34.4%
1810	Free Black	4,554	1.1%	+42.9%
1810	Total	415,115	100%	+20.1%
1820	White	237,440	47.2%	+10.9%
1820	Slave	258,475	51.4%	+31.6%
1820	Free Black	6,826	1.4%	+49.9%
1820	Total	502,741	100%	+21.1%
1830	White	257,863	44.4%	+8.6%
1830	Slave	323,322	55.6%	+25.1%
1830	Total	581,185	100%	+15.6%
1840	White	259,084	43.6%	+0.5%
1840	Slave	327,038	55.0%	+1.2%
1840	Free Black	8,276	1.4%	+21.2%
1840	Total	594,398	100%	+2.3%
1850	White	274,563	41.1%	+6.0%
1850	Slave	393,944	58.9%	+20.5%
1850	Total	668,507	100%	+12.5%
1860	White	271,300	41.4%	+6.1%
1860	Slave	487,406	57.2%	+2.2%
1860	Free Black	9,914	1.4%	+19.8%
1860	Other	88	0.0%	–
1860	Total	703,708	100%	+5.3%
1870	White	289,667	41.1%	-0.6%
1870	Black	465,814	58.9%	+3.3%
1870	Other	125	0.0%	+42.1%
1870	Total	705,606	100%	+0.3%
1880	White	391,105	39.3%	+35.0%
1880	Black	604,332	60.7%	+45.3%
1880	Other	140	0.0%	+12.0%
1880	Total	995,577	100%	+41.1%
1890	White	462,008	40.1%	+18.1%
1890	Black	728,934	59.9%	+14.0%
1890	Other	207	0.0%	+47.9%
1890	Total	1,151,149	100%	+15.6%
1900	White	547,807	41.6%	+20.7%
1900	Black	789,321	58.4%	+13.6%
1900	Other	188	0.0%	-9.2%
1900	Total	1,340,316	100%	+16.4%
1910	White	679,161	44.9%	+21.8%
1910	Black	833,843	55.1%	+6.6%
1910	Other	396	0.0%	+110.6%
1910	Total	1,515,400	100%	+13.1%
1920	White	878,538	51.4%	+20.5%
1920	Black	864,719	48.6%	+3.7%
1920	Other	467	0.0%	+17.9%
1920	Total	1,683,724	100%	+11.1%
1930	White	994,049	54.3%	+15.3%
1930	Black	693,681	45.6%	-8.2%
1930	Other	1,035	0.1%	+121.6%
1930	Total	1,738,765	100%	+3.3%
1940	White	1,084,308	57.1%	+14.9%
1940	Black	714,164	42.9%	+2.6%
1940	Other	1,332	0.1%	+28.7%
1940	Total	1,899,804	100%	+9.3%
1950	White	1,293,405	61.1%	+19.3%
1950	Black	722,077	38.8%	+1.0%
1950	Other	1,545	0.1%	+16.0%
1950	Total	2,117,027	100%	+11.4%
1960	White	1,551,022	65.1%	+19.9%
1960	Black	829,291	34.8%	+0.9%
1960	Other	2,281	0.1%	+47.6%
1960	Total	2,382,594	100%	+12.5%
1970	White	1,794,430	69.3%	+15.7%
1970	Black	789,041	30.4%	-4.9%
1970	Other	7,045	0.3%	+208.9%
1970	Total	2,590,516	100%	+8.7%
1980	White	2,147,224	68.8%	+19.7%
1980	Black	948,623	30.4%	+20.2%
1980	Other	25,973	0.8%	+268.7%
1980	Total	3,121,820	100%	+20.5%
1990	White	2,406,974	69.0%	+12.1%
1990	Black	1,039,884	29.8%	+9.6%
1990	Other	39,845	1.2%	+53.4%
1990	Total	3,486,703	100%	+11.7%
2000	White	2,695,560	67.2%	+12.0%
2000	Black	1,185,216	29.5%	+14.0%
2000	Other	131,236	3.3%	+229.4%
2000	Total	4,012,012	100%	+15.1%
2010	White	3,062,000	66.2%	+13.6%
2010	Black	1,290,684	27.9%	+8.9%
2010	Other	274,680	5.9%	+109.3%
2010	Total	4,625,364	100%	+15.3%
