= York Historic District =

York Historic District may refer to:

- York Historic District (York, Maine), listed on the National Register of Historic Places (NRHP)
- York Historic District (York, Pennsylvania), listed on the NRHP in York County, Pennsylvania
- York Historic District (York, South Carolina), listed on the NRHP
- York Historic District (Bellingham, Washington), listed on the NRHP in Whatcom County, Washington
