= York Historic District (York, South Carolina) =

Historic district in South Carolina, United States

- U.S. National Register of Historic Places
- U.S. Historic district
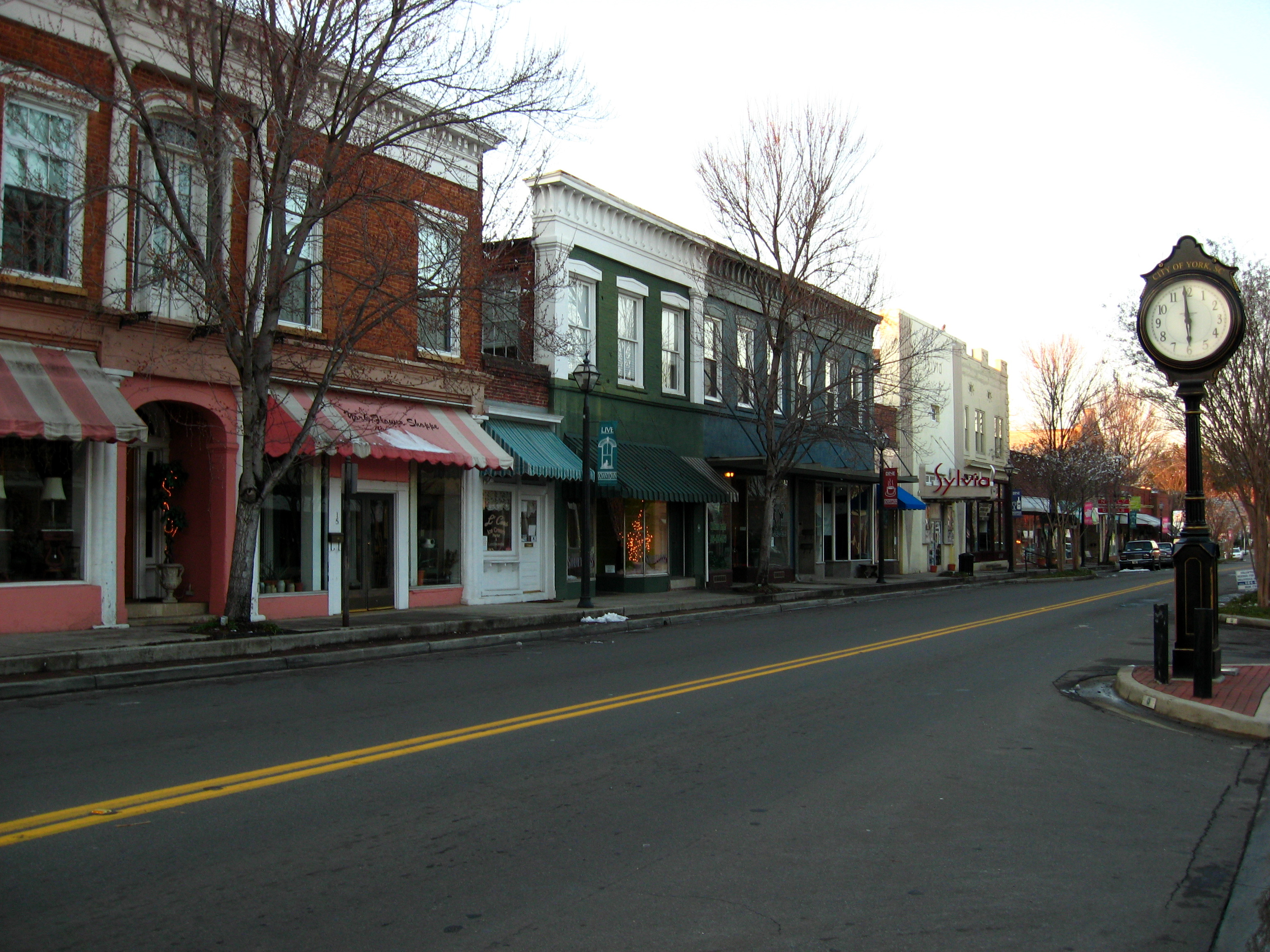
- Downtown York, South Carolina

- Location within South Carolina Location within the United States
- Location: SC 5 and U.S. 321, York, South Carolina
- Coordinates: 34°59′53″N 81°13′35″W
- Area: 170 acres (69 ha)
- Architect: Walker, C.
- Architectural style: Classical Revival, Greek Revival, Gothic Revival
- NRHP reference No.: 79002396
- Added to NRHP: October 18, 1979

York Historic District in York, South Carolina is a historic district that was listed on the National Register of Historic Places in 1979.

The district includes Hart House and Wilson House, which are both separately listed on the NRHP.

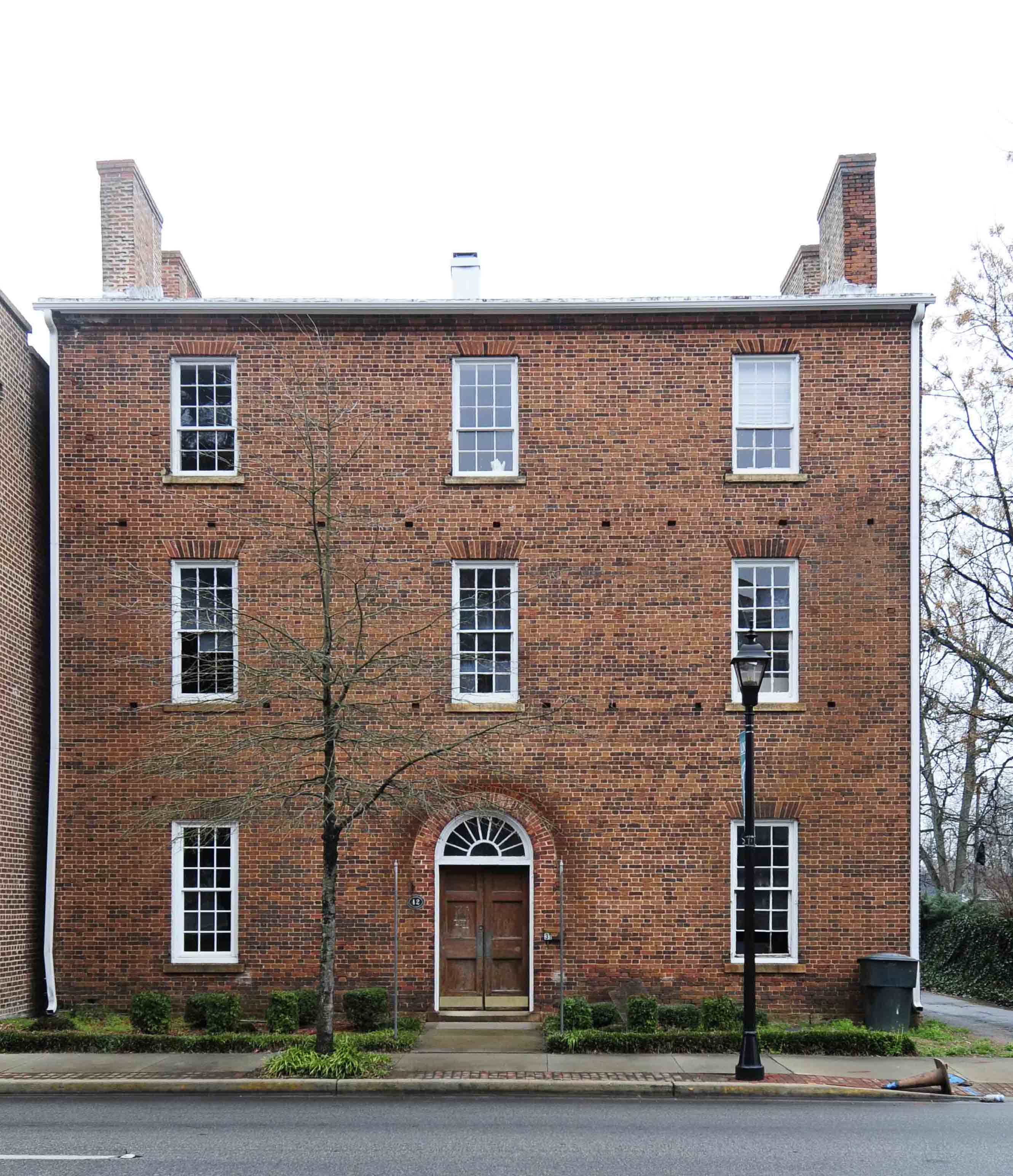
Wilson House Old Jail

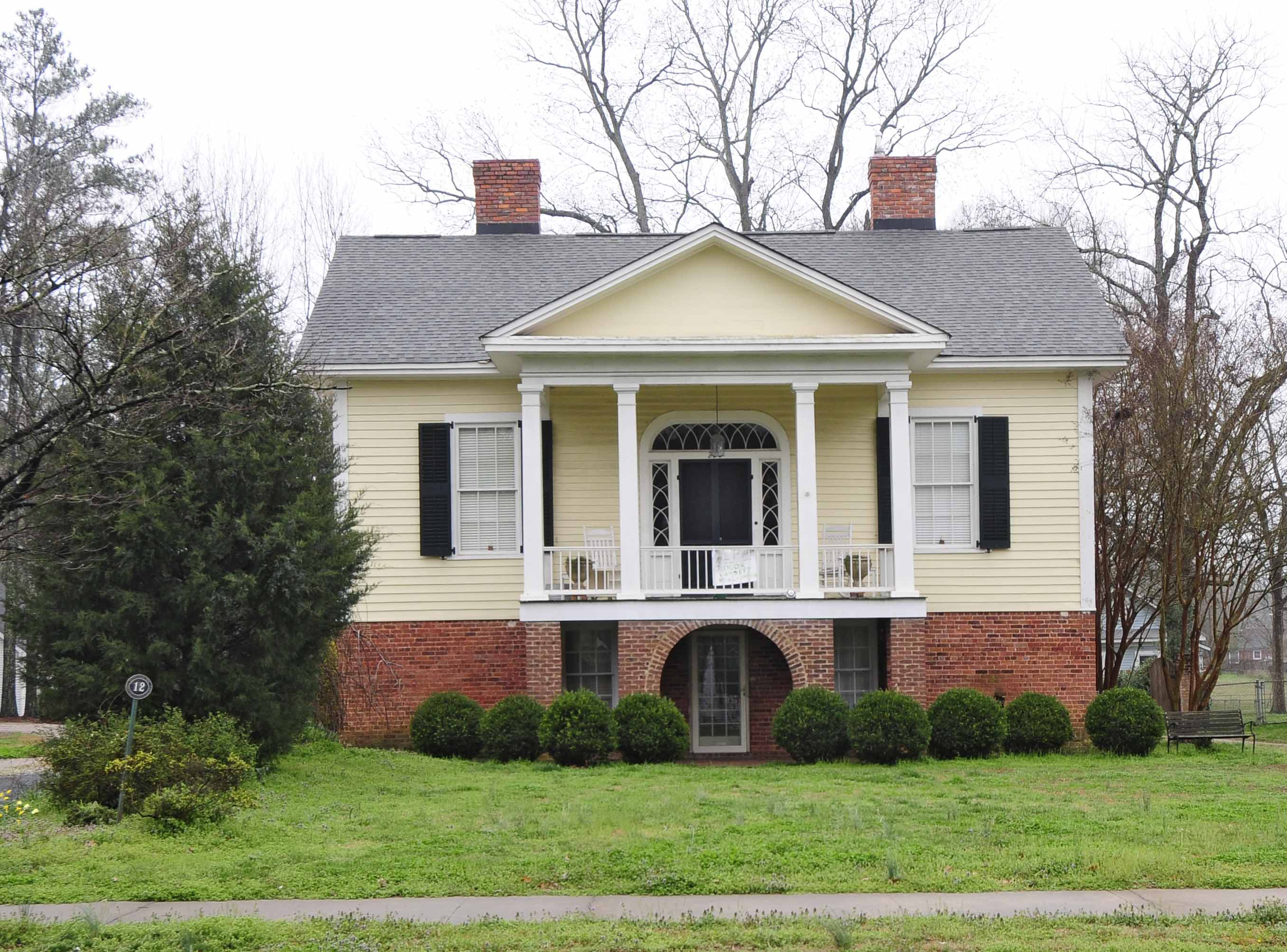
Hart House
