= Dulcina DeBerry =

American educator and librarian

- Born: June 12, 1878; York, South Carolina, US
- Died: December 29, 1969 (aged 91); Cleveland, Ohio, US
- Education: Talladega College; Shaw University
- Occupations: Librarian, educator

Dulcina DeBerry (June 12, 1878 – December 29, 1969) was an American educator and librarian. She became the first African American to work as a librarian in Madison County, Alabama, when in 1940 she arranged the opening of the first public library for black community members in the Huntsville area.

== Early life and education ==
Dulcina B. Torrence was born June 12, 1878, in York, South Carolina. She graduated from a two-year normal school and later earned a degree from Shaw University.

Her first job was as a schoolteacher in King's Mountain, North Carolina. Around 1903 she went to Talladega College where she met her husband, Perfect DeBerry, who was studying to become a minister. For the next thirty-five years she taught schoolchildren and lived with her family in North Carolina, Missouri, and Ohio.

== Work as a librarian ==
After retiring from teaching, DeBerry moved to Huntsville, Alabama, in 1940 to care for her elderly mother. An avid reader, she was dismayed to learn that the Huntsville Public Library was closed to African Americans; there were no alternate library services in the area. She reached out to the librarian at the central branch, who covertly lent DeBerry books from the library. The librarian arranged a meeting with DeBerry and the library director, and the director agreed to apply for funding from the Works Progress Administration for library resources for African Americans to use. DeBerry was given access to a small space in the basement of the nearby Lakeside Methodist Church; ten days later, the library opened.

Focus on children's literacy was a main focus of the library. DeBerry held a summer vacation reading club, a children's story hour, and offered services to the Madison County schools so teachers could use library books in their classrooms. DeBerry organized leading black citizens to serve on the library's board. In November 1940, the library moved to Winston Street School and was named the Winston Street Branch Library; in 1943, the Huntsville Library officially claimed the library as one of its branches, keeping DeBerry as librarian.

In 1947 the library moved to a larger building and was renamed the Dulcina DeBerry Library. Funding for the library primarily came from the African American community through fundraisers until the city began providing an annual allocation for the library in 1948. In 1951 the library moved again, sharing a space with a community center.

DeBerry retired from the library and returned home to Raleigh, North Carolina, in 1951.

After Urban Renewal Authority efforts began in Huntsville in the 1960s, the library moved once more; in 1968 the library board decided to focus their efforts on bookmobiles, and the Dulcina DeBerry Library was closed in October 1968.

== Later life and death ==
DeBerry and her husband later moved to Cleveland, Ohio, and DeBerry died there on December 29, 1969.
