= York County School District 1 =

School district in South Carolina, United States

York County School District 1 (York School District)

Address
- 1475 E. Liberty Street York, South Carolina, 29745; United States

District information
- Type: Public School District
- Grades: Pre-K—12
- Superintendent: Dr. Heath Branham
- NCES District ID: 4503810

Students and staff
- Students: 5,238 (2019-2020)
- Staff: 417 certified employees; 337 classified employees(on FTE basis)
- Student–teacher ratio: 14.35
- District mascot: Cougars

Other information
- Website: www.york.k12.sc.us

York School District is a suburban school district in York County, South Carolina. The district serves 5,286 students. Students from the cities of York, Sharon, Hickory Grove, and McConnells, and other unincorporated areas of southern and southwestern York County attend York schools.

The racial composition of the district is as follows: 73% white, 20% African American, 4% Hispanic and 3% other.

52.9% of students are eligible for free and reduced lunch. All schools within York School District One are eligible for Title I but the school district chooses the 3 most needy schools to concentrate funding on.

== Administration ==
Mrs. Kelly Coxe was unanimously voted upon by the York School District One Board of Trustees on September 11, 2018. She officially took office in January 2019. The prior superintendent of the York School District was Dr. Vernon Prosser, who resigned in 2018. The board of trustees members are: Dr. Al Johnson (term ending in 2012), Shirley Harris (term ending in 2010), Betty F. Johnson (term ending in 2010), Melissa Ramsey (term ending in 2012), Chris Revels, chairman (term ending in 2012), Mike Smith (term ending in 2010), and Chris Stevenson, vice-chair (term ending in 2012).

== Schools ==
There are 10 schools in York School District One: five elementary schools, one intermediate school, one middle school, one high school, one alternative school, and one technology center.

Elementary Schools

- Cotton Belt Elementary (K-4th grade)
- Harold C Johnson Elementary (K-4th grade)
- Hickory Grove-Sharon Elementary (K-6th grade)
- Hunter Street Elementary (K-4th grade)
- Jefferson Elementary (K-4th grade)

Middle Schools

- York Intermediate School (5th & 6th grade)
- York Middle School (7th and 8th grade)

High Schools

- York Comprehensive High School (9th - 12th grade)

Alternative Schools

- York One Academy

Technology Schools

- Floyd D. Johnson Technology Center
