= Allison Plantation =

Historic house in South Carolina, United States

- U.S. National Register of Historic Places
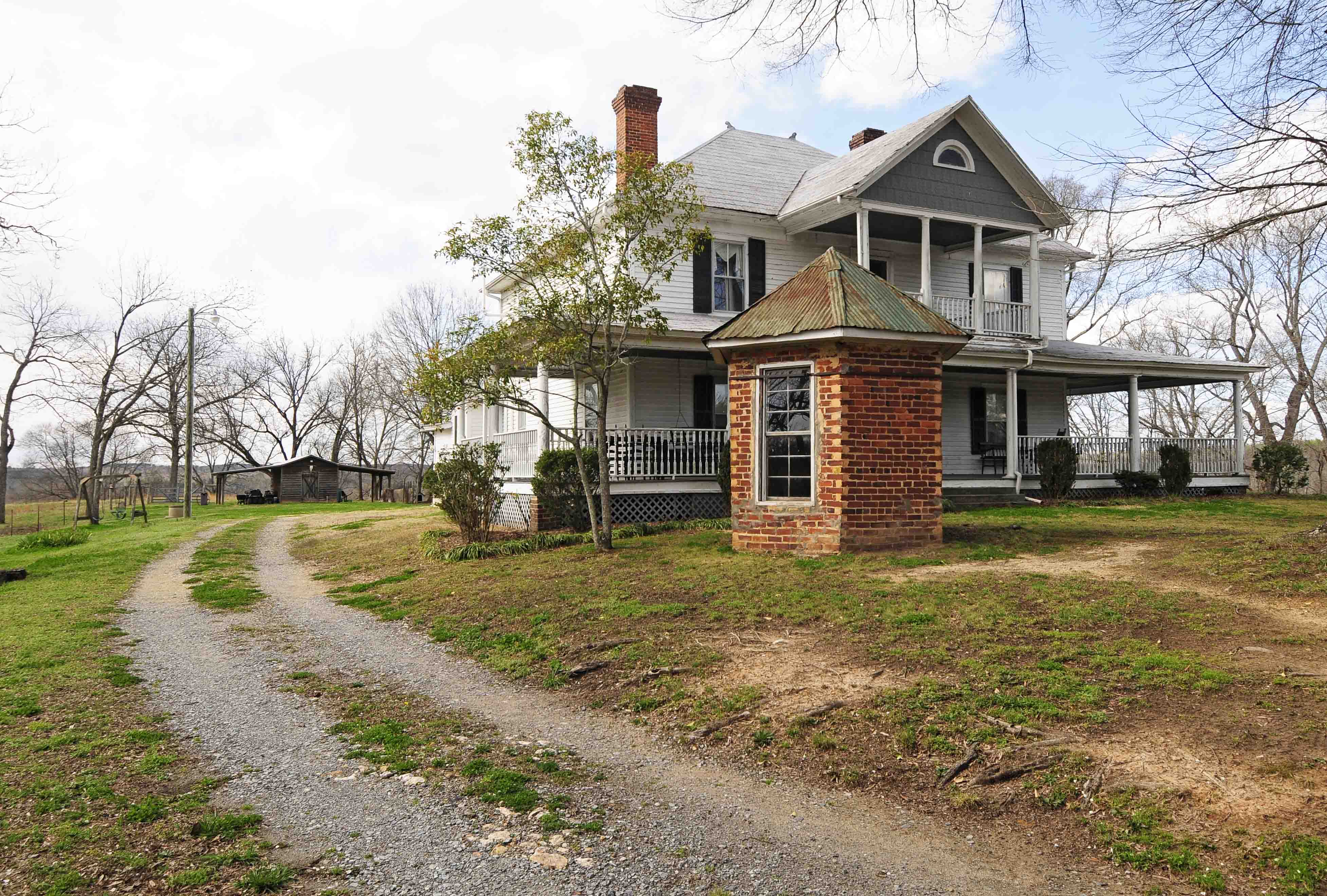
- Allison Plantation, March 2012

- Location within South Carolina Location within the United States
- Location: Off South Carolina Highways 40 and 60, near York, South Carolina
- Coordinates: 35°0′8″N 81°22′32″W
- Area: 42 acres (17 ha)
- Built: 1860
- Architectural style: Greek Revival
- NRHP reference No.: 80003716
- Added to NRHP: September 29, 1980

Allison Plantation is a historic home and farm complex located near York, York County, South Carolina. The main house was built about 1860, and is a 2 1/2-story, frame Greek Revival style dwelling. It has a two-room one-story frame ell and two-story pedimented portico supported by square columns. Also on the property are a one-story frame barn, remains of the detached log kitchen, a concrete pedestal for a windmill, a spring house, smokehouse, mill, and the dilapidated remains of Dr. Allison's Drugstore. It was the home of Dr. Robert Turner Allison, a locally prominent physician and politician.

It was added to the National Register of Historic Places in 1980.

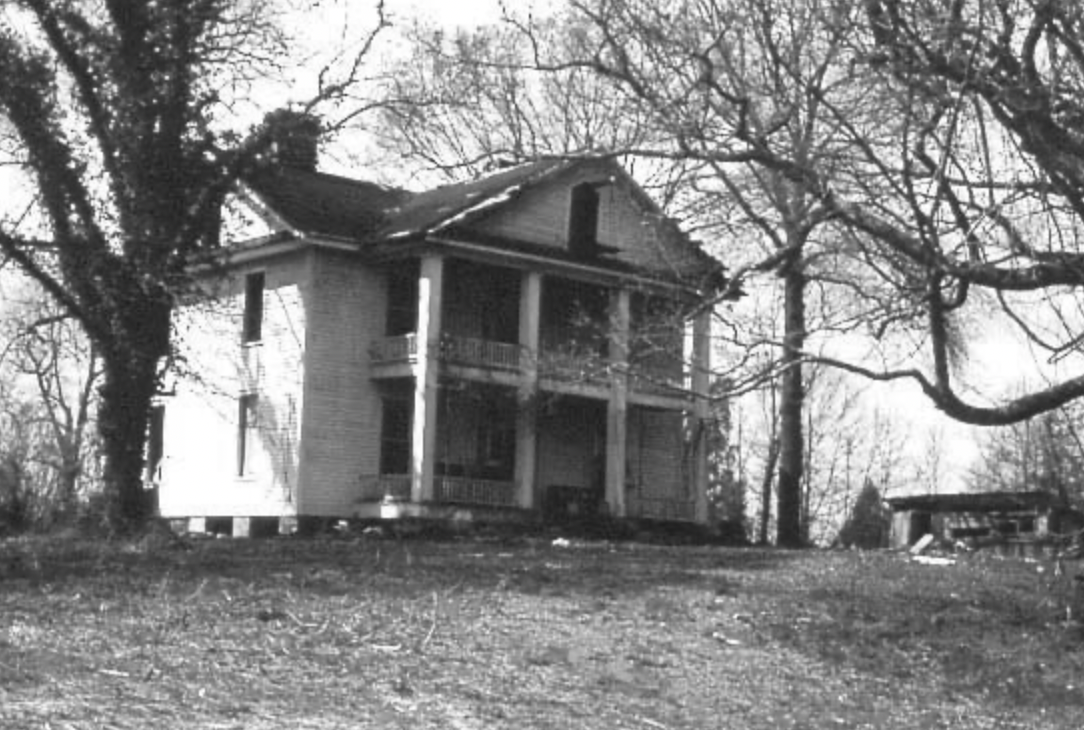
Allison Plantation house, c. 1860
