= York Comprehensive High School =

Location
- 275 Alexander Love Highway; York, South Carolina 29745; United States; 35°00′53″N 81°13′34″W

Information
- School type: Public, high school
- School district: York School District 1
- Superintendent: Kelly Coxe
- Principal: Jenna Markey
- Staff: 87.50 (FTE)
- Grades: 9–12
- Enrollment: 1,525 (2023-2024)
- Student to teacher ratio: 17.43
- Colors: Black and gray
- Athletics conference: Region III–AAAA
- Mascot: Cougar
- Rival: Clover High School

York Comprehensive High School is the sole high school in York County School District 1. Mrs. Jenna Howell-Markey serves as principal. The school is located in York, South Carolina.

Due to the growth and aging of the original building, a new high school was built. The new high school is on Alexander Love Highway. The new campus will accommodate grades 9–12. Ninth graders had been housed at York Junior High for several years because the old York Comprehensive could not handle a large number of students. The new campus is designed to hold 1,800 students.

== Sports, clubs, and activities ==
York Comprehensive athletes will compete in Region III–AAAA. Other schools in the region are:

- AC Flora High School
- Camden High School
- Dreher High School
- Lancaster High School
- Richland Northeast High School
- South Pointe High School

York's arch rival in sports is the Clover High School Blue Eagles. The rivalry is one of the oldest in the state.

- The school's women's basketball team won the 2001–2002 AAA state championship.
- The women's basketball team, also led by Latta was a runner-up in the 2002–2003 AAA state championship.

== Controversy ==
In May 2015, the school became the center of a national controversy when it banned the act of flying large flags from vehicles on the school grounds. Soon after posts on social media, this ban got national attention, mostly due to the perception that this policy was an attack on the American flag itself. In response to protests and threats of litigation, the school reversed the flag ban, allowing the American flag to be flown on vehicles.

== Notable alumni ==
- Josh Davis, NFL wide receiver
- Spencer Lanning, NFL punter
- Ivory Latta, WNBA player
- Beau Nunn, professional football player
- John Spratt, politician
- Charles Randolph-Wright, film, television, and theater director; television producer, screenwriter, and playwright
- Keith Richardson, MMA fighter and bare-knuckle boxer
