= Lake Pointe Academy =

Location
- 3168 Hands Mill Hwy; York, SC, 29745; United States
- Coordinates: 35.0635°N 81.0912°W

Information
- Type: Private
- Motto: Educate, encourage, equip
- Established: 2005
- Grades: K5-12
- Enrollment: 197
- Slogan: A ship in harbor is safe, but that is not what a ship is for. – John Shedd
- Mascot: Mariner
- Website: www.lakepointeacademy.com

Lake Pointe Academy is a private, inter-denominationally Christian, college prep school.

It is located in York, SC.
