= Witherspoon-Hunter House =

Historic house in South Carolina, United States

- U.S. National Register of Historic Places
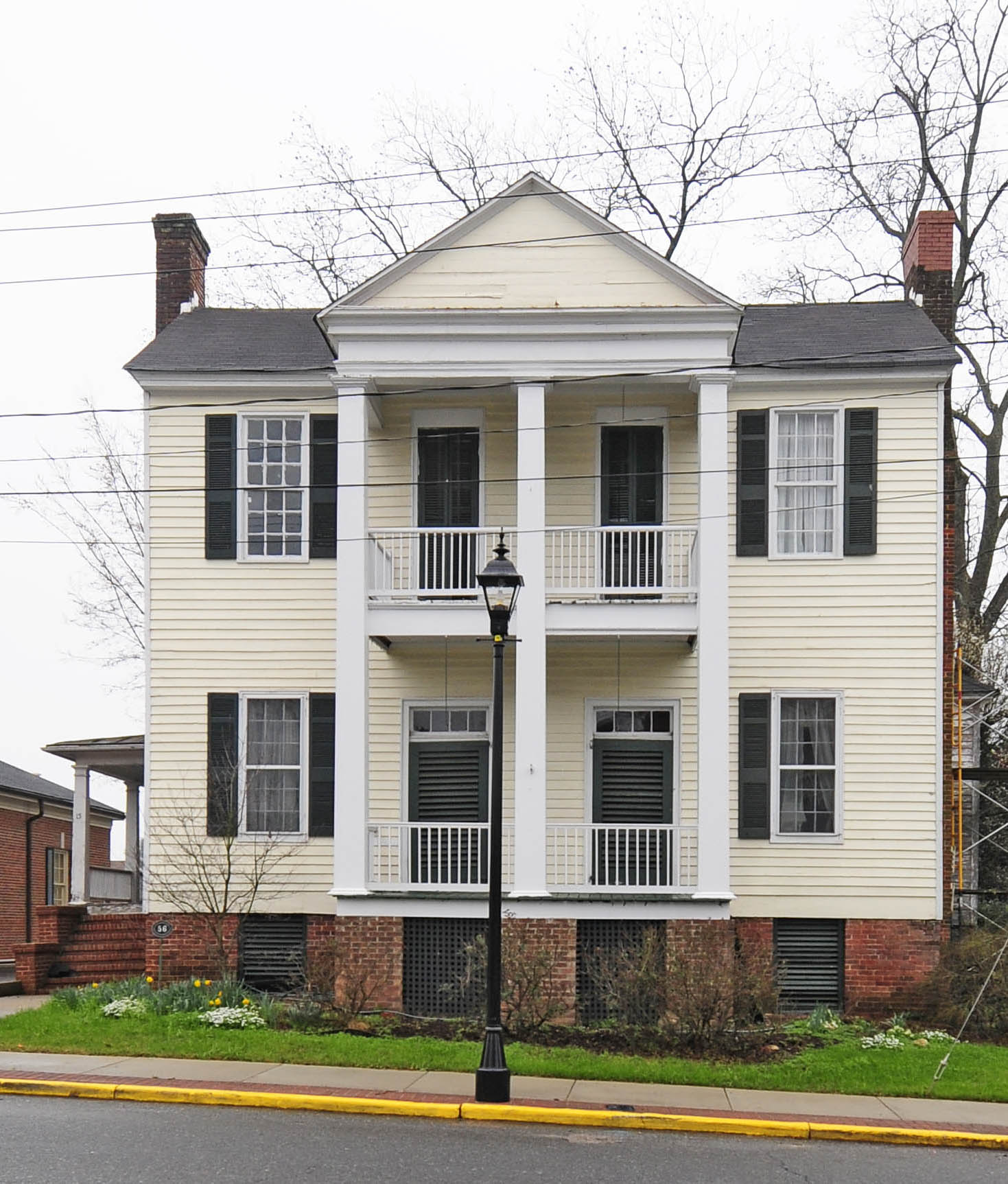
- Witherspoon-Hunter House, March 2012

- Location within South Carolina Location within the United States
- Location: 15 W. Liberty St., York, South Carolina
- Coordinates: 34°59′50″N 81°14′37″W
- Area: less than one acre
- Built: c. 1825
- Built by: Hoover, Thomas B.
- NRHP reference No.: 78002536
- Added to NRHP: February 7, 1978

Witherspoon-Hunter House is a historic home located at York, York County, South Carolina. It was built about 1825, and consists of a two-story, front section covered by a gable roof, with a one-story L-shaped rear annex. The house is of frame construction and rests upon a raised brick basement. It features a double-tiered front portico. Also on the property is a small brick building.

It was added to the National Register of Historic Places in 1978.
