= York, South Carolina =

- City
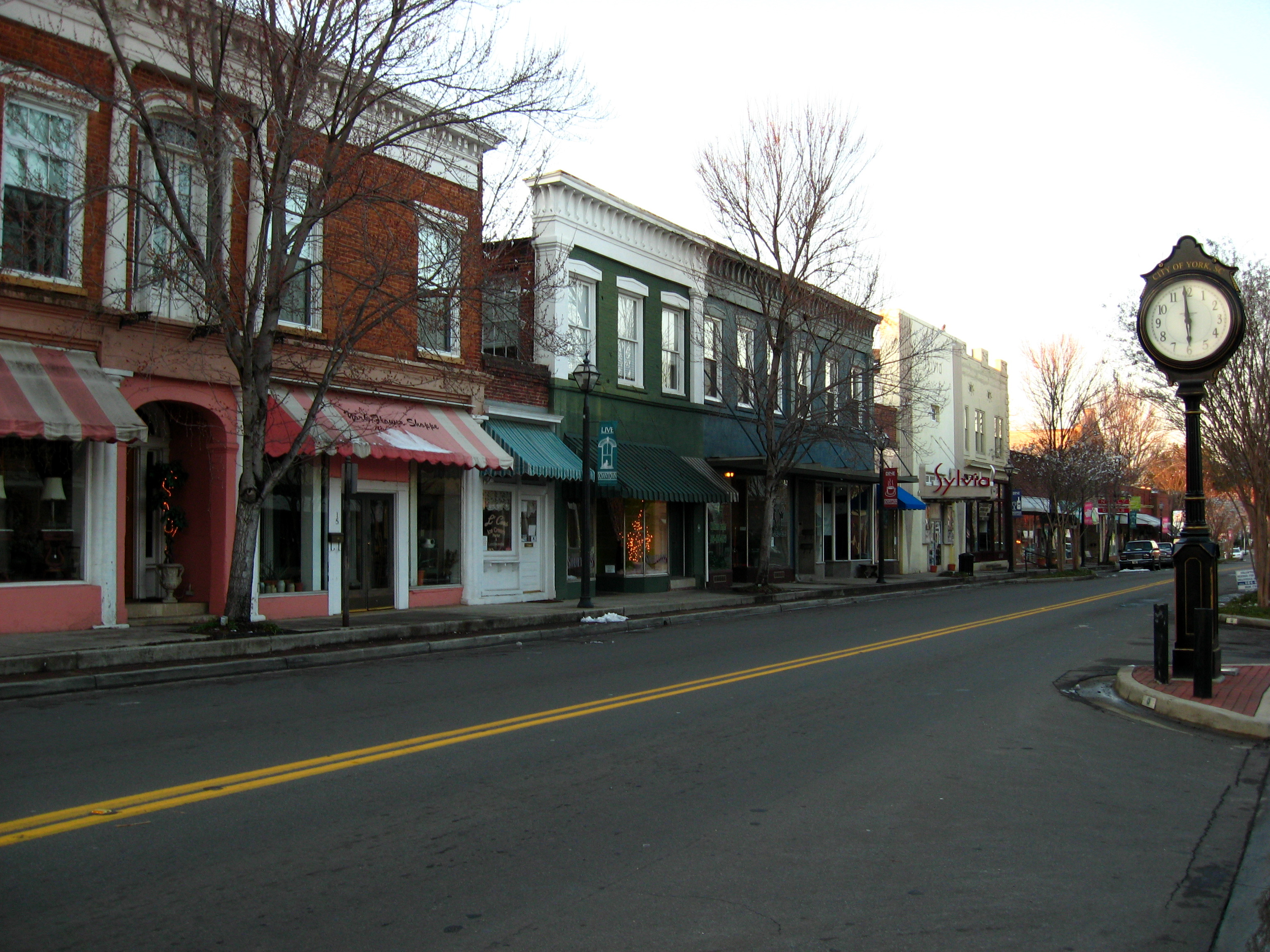
- Downtown York, 2009

- Seal
- Nickname: The White Rose City
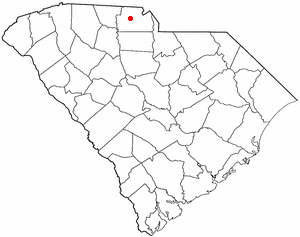
- Location of York, South Carolina
- Coordinates: 35°00′20″N 81°14′22″W
- Country: United States
- State: South Carolina
- County: York

Government
  - Type: Council-Manager

Area
  - Total: 8.60 sq mi (22.27 km^{2})
  - Land: 8.48 sq mi (21.96 km^{2})
  - Water: 0.12 sq mi (0.31 km^{2})
- Elevation: 725 ft (221 m)

Population (2020)
  - Total: 8,503
  - Density: 1,002.7/sq mi (387.15/km^{2})
  - Demonym: Yorkite
- Time zone: UTC-5 (Eastern (EST))
  - Summer (DST): UTC-4 (EDT)
- ZIP code: 29745
- Area codes: 803, 839
- FIPS code: 45-79630
- GNIS feature ID: 2405801
- Website: yorksc.gov

York /ˈjɔːrk/ is a city in and the county seat of York County, South Carolina, United States. The population was approximately 7,736 at the 2010 census, and up to 8,053 as of the 2020 census. York is located approximately 27 miles (43 km) southwest of Charlotte, North Carolina and 13 miles (21 km) west of Rock Hill, South Carolina.

== History ==
The first European settlers came to York in the early 1750s, having migrated south from Pennsylvania and Virginia. Of the three major groups settling Pennsylvania, the English came first, then the Germans, and then the Scots. The county names of Lancashire, Cheshire and Yorkshire had been brought from England to Pennsylvania, and then on to South Carolina by the early settlers.

Prior to this, the first known inhabitants of York County were the Catawba Indians.

The town of York was originally known as Fergus's Crossroads for a tavern, owned by two brothers, William and John Fergus, that was located at the intersection of the road from Rutherfordton to Camden and the road from Charlottesburg (Charlotte) to Augusta. When the county of York was established in 1785 the state statute required each county to erect a courthouse and public buildings in the most convenient part of the county, with a tax levied to cover the cost of "building the court houses, prisons, pillories, whipping posts and stocks." Fergus's Crossroads was near the geographic center of the newly formed county and was chosen for the site of the new county seat.

The town of Yorkville was established as the County seat in 1785. Situated between two Revolutionary battle sites, the Battle of Kings Mountain and the Battle of Williamson's Plantation, York was the only county in South Carolina to remain undefeated during that war.

In 1823, there were 451 people living in Yorkville, 292 white and 159 black, with 80 houses in the town, eight stores, five taverns, one male academy and one female academy and a printing office. The town could boast 52 mechanics, eight lawyers, two physicians and one clergyman.

Yorkville was officially incorporated on December 7, 1841. W. I. Clawson was the first mayor, and Stanhope Sadler, F. M. Galbraith, T. H. Simril and B. T. Wheeler were wardens. The population was about 800. Over the next two decades, before the outbreak of the American Civil War, Yorkville's population swelled to 2,000. In 1860 a gas works was installed on West Liberty Street, below the old county jail; Yorkville was the first town in the Upcountry with gas lighting.

In 1853, Lewis Grist bought his father's newspaper and changed the name to the Yorkville Enquirer, which was published weekly until 2006, when it was merged with the Clover Herald to form the Enquirer-Herald, a weekly newspaper covering western York County.

In 1915, the residents of the town voted to shorten its name to "York".

=== Antebellum education ===
Private academies operated on and off during Yorkville's early years. In 1854, the Yorkville Female Academy was established on East Jefferson Street. The next year, Micah Jenkins and Asbury Coward, young Citadel graduates, established the King's Mountain Military Academy. It was closed during the Civil War, during which Jenkins was killed, but Coward returned to Yorkville and reopened the school. The original buildings no longer stand, but it became the site of the Episcopal Church Home for Children, an orphanage located for many years in York, which is today a treatment center for emotionally disturbed children named York Place.

=== Historic sites ===
Allison Plantation, Hart House, Wilson House, Witherspoon-Hunter House, York County Courthouse, and York Historic District are listed on the National Register of Historic Places.

The Rose Hotel was built in 1852, by Dr. E.A. Crenshaw and was referred to in the Lowcountry as one of the most palatial hotels in the Upcountry. Today it has been restored and completely renovated as apartments.

The First Presbyterian Church was designed in 1846 by Robert Walker, a noted architect from Charleston, but construction wasn't begun until several years later and wasn't completed until after the Civil War. A gallery originally lined three sides of the sanctuary, part of it remains as a rear balcony, and the chancel originally featured a single uplifted pulpit that was converted in 1949 to a divided chancel and choir loft. The building is listed on the National Register of Historic Places and the American Presbyterian and Reformed Historical Sites.

The present York County Courthouse was completed in 1914 and an annex was built in 1955, which completes the present structure, the fourth courthouse to occupy the site. The third courthouse, which was torn down in 1912 to make way for the present one, was designed by Robert Mills, the architect of the Washington Monument and the U.S. Treasury Building, as well as many other courthouses in South Carolina. Most county court functions are conducted now at the Moss Justice Center, on the eastern edge of town.

In 1976, as a part of the National Bicentennial, downtown York was designated a Historic District on the National Register of Historic Places, one of the largest historic districts in the state, consisting of 340 acres (1.4 km^{2}) and containing over 180 historic structures and landmarks.

== Geography ==
According to the United States Census Bureau, the city has a total area of 7.9 square miles (20 km^{2}), of which 7.9 square miles (20 km^{2}) is land and 0.1 square miles (0.26 km^{2}) (0.88%) is water.

== Demographics ==
Historical population
Census	Pop.	Note	%±
1850	511		—
1860	1,360		166.1%
1880	1,330		—
1890	1,553		16.8%
1900	2,012		29.6%
1910	2,326		15.6%
1920	2,731		17.4%
1930	2,827		3.5%
1940	3,495		23.6%
1950	4,181		19.6%
1960	4,758		13.8%
1970	5,081		6.8%
1980	6,412		26.2%
1990	6,709		4.6%
2000	6,985		4.1%
2010	7,736		10.8%
2020	8,503		9.9%
2025 (est.)	10,620	▲	24.9%
U.S. Decennial Census

York first appeared in the 1850 U.S. Census as "Yorkville". The town a recorded population of 511 excluding slaves, which were not separately returned.

=== 2020 census ===
As of the 2020 census, York had a population of 8,503 and a median age of 36.6 years. 27.1% of residents were under the age of 18 and 16.8% of residents were 65 years of age or older. For every 100 females there were 84.6 males, and for every 100 females age 18 and over there were 78.4 males age 18 and over.

96.8% of residents lived in urban areas, while 3.2% lived in rural areas.

There were 3,244 households in York, of which 36.7% had children under the age of 18 living in them. Of all households, 34.7% were married-couple households, 17.1% were households with a male householder and no spouse or partner present, and 40.8% were households with a female householder and no spouse or partner present. About 27.6% of all households were made up of individuals and 13.4% had someone living alone who was 65 years of age or older.

There were 3,497 housing units, of which 7.2% were vacant. The homeowner vacancy rate was 2.5% and the rental vacancy rate was 5.6%.

Racial composition as of the 2020 census
Race	Number	Percent
White	4,427	52.1%
Black or African American	3,040	35.8%
American Indian and Alaska Native	39	0.5%
Asian	74	0.9%
Native Hawaiian and Other Pacific Islander	5	0.1%
Some other race	387	4.6%
Two or more races	531	6.2%
Hispanic or Latino (of any race)	723	8.5%

=== 2000 census ===
As of the census of 2000, there were 6,985 people, 2,536 households, and 1,787 families residing in the city. The population density was 887.6 inhabitants per square mile (342.7/km^{2}). There were 2,766 housing units at an average density of 351.5 per square mile (135.7/km^{2}). The racial makeup of the city was 51.8% White, 38.4% African American, 0.8% Native American, 0.6% Asian, 3.65% from other races, and 2.1% from two or more races. Hispanic or Latino of any race were 7.03% of the population.

There were 2,536 households, out of which 33.5% had children under the age of 18 living with them, 39.9% were married couples living together, 25.2% had a female householder with no husband present, and 29.5% were non-families. 25.3% of all households were made up of individuals, and 11.2% had someone living alone who was 65 years of age or older. The average household size was 2.65 and the average family size was 3.13.

In the city, the population was spread out, with 27.9% under the age of 18, 9.1% from 18 to 24, 28.7% from 25 to 44, 19.6% from 45 to 64, and 14.5% who were 65 years of age or older. The median age was 34 years. For every 100 females, there were 86.0 males. For every 100 females age 18 and over, there were 79.8 males.

The median income for a household in the city was $30,564, and the median income for a family was $34,253. Males had a median income of $31,646 versus $20,290 for females. The per capita income for the city was $14,218. About 17.2% of families and 30.6% of the population were below the poverty line, including 23.6% of those under age 18 and 13.5% of those age 65 or over.

== Education ==
York is served by York County School District 1 with seven elementary schools, one intermediate school, one middle school and one high school, York Comprehensive High School.

York has a public library, a branch of the York County Library.

- Lake Pointe Academy (2005)

== Notable Person ==
- Dulcina DeBerry (1878–1969), educator and librarian
