= Hart House (York, South Carolina) =

Historic house in South Carolina, United States

- U.S. National Register of Historic Places
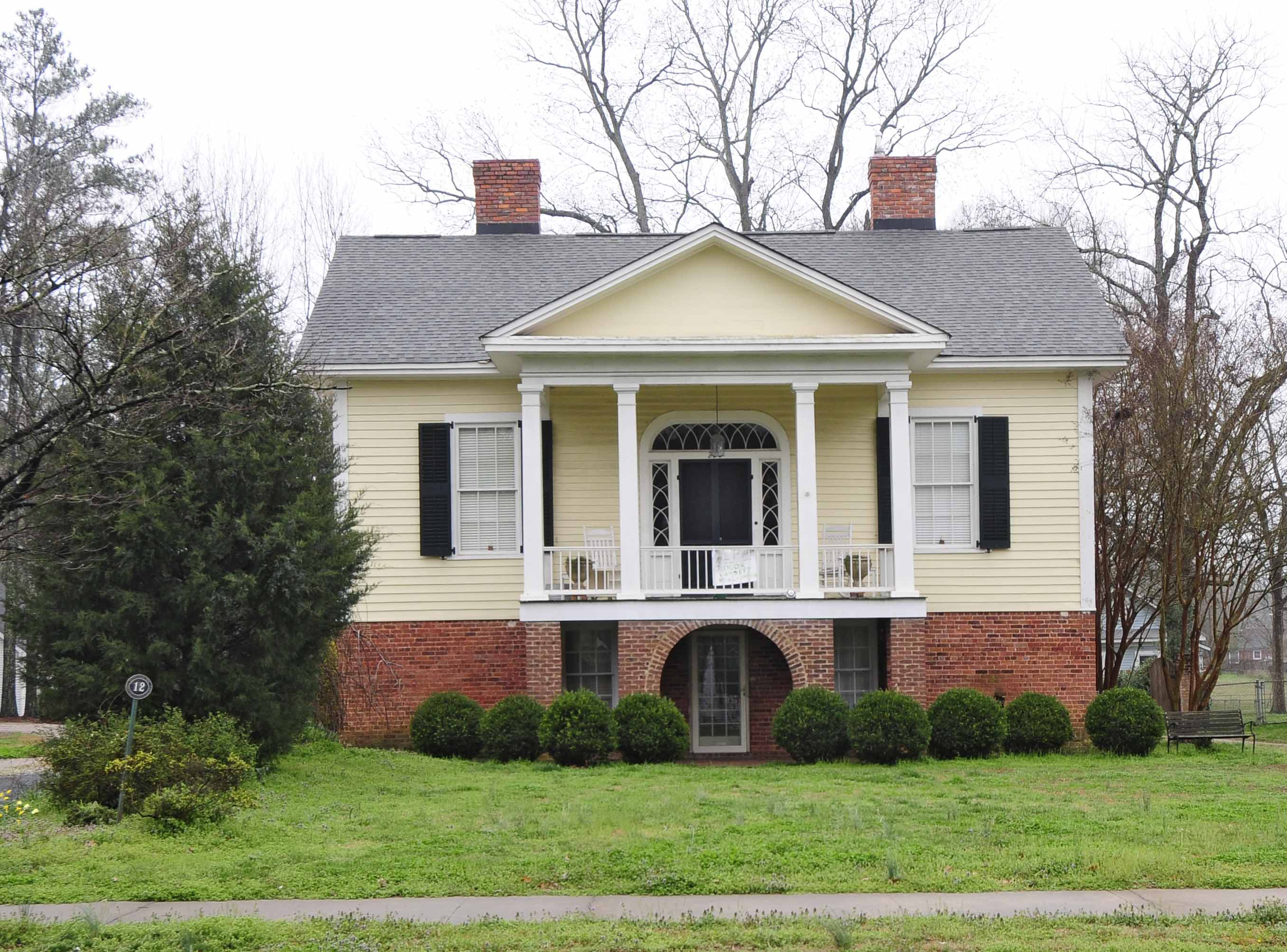
- Hart House, March 2012

- Location within South Carolina Location within the United States
- Location: 220 E. Liberty St., York, South Carolina
- Coordinates: 34°59′29″N 81°14′12″W
- Area: 0.6 acres (0.24 ha)
- Built: c. 1855
- Architectural style: Greek Revival
- NRHP reference No.: 77001236
- Added to NRHP: December 2, 1977

Hart House is a historic home located at York, York County, South Carolina. It was built about 1855, and is a frame Greek Revival style raised cottage on a brick foundation. It features Palladian windows in the gable ends and a double portico with simple square columns.

It was added to the National Register of Historic Places in 1977.
