= Wilson House (York, South Carolina) =

Historic house in South Carolina, United States

- U.S. National Register of Historic Places
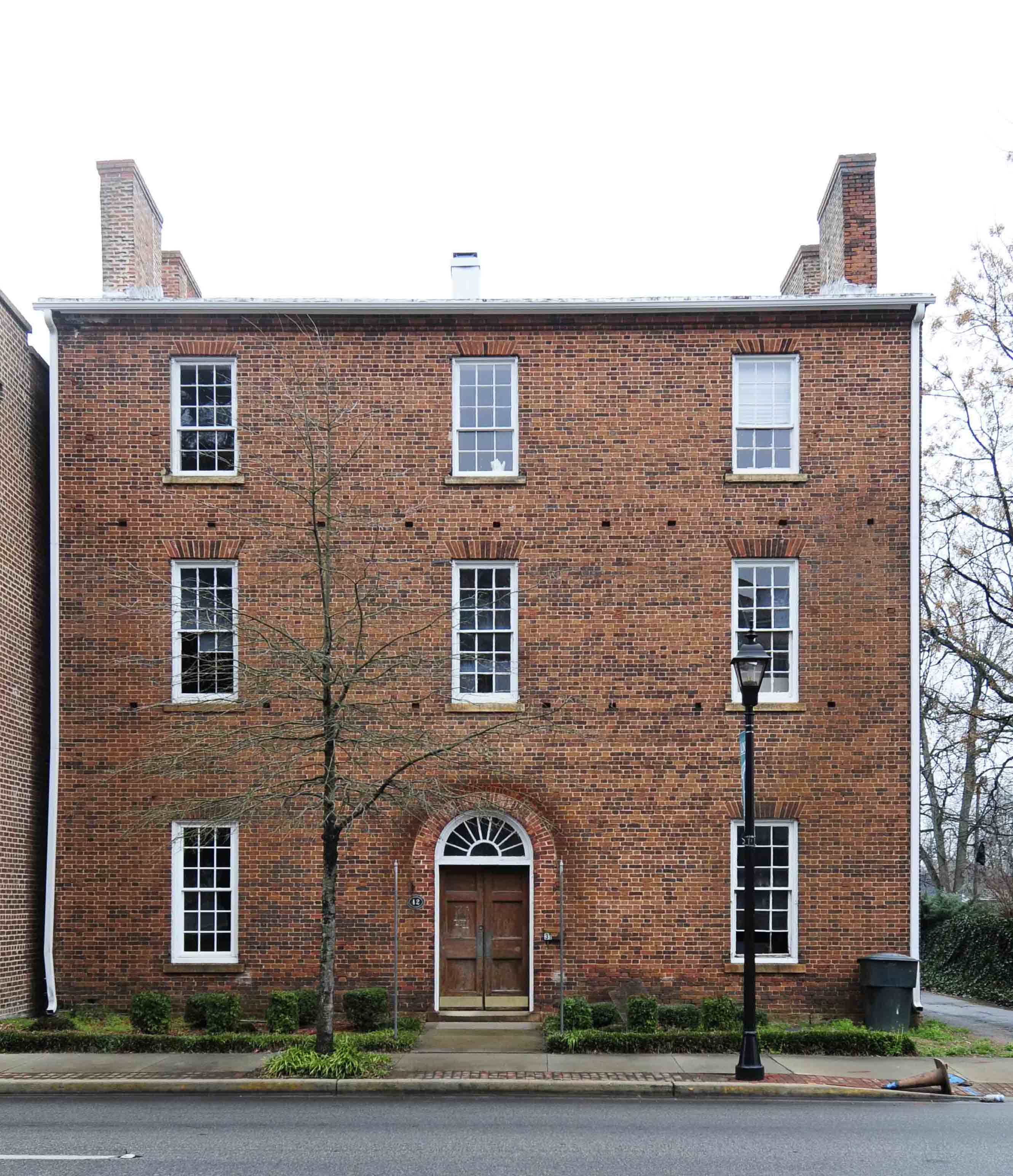
- Wilson House, March 2012

- Location within South Carolina Location within the United States
- Location: 3 S. Congress St., York, South Carolina
- Coordinates: 34°59′36″N 81°14′32″W
- Area: 1.8 acres (0.73 ha)
- Built: 1828
- Built by: Hoover, Thomas B.
- Architect: Mills, Robert
- NRHP reference No.: 74001887
- Added to NRHP: November 20, 1974

Wilson House, also known as Old Jail and Yorkville Jail, is a historic home located in York, York County, South Carolina. It is attributed to Robert Mills and was built in 1828. It is a three-story, brick building originally designed as a local jail. It features brick arches and a semi-circular fanlight. It was converted into a residence in 1853, and then used as a jail during the Reconstruction Era when Federal troops imprisoned Ku Klux Klan members.

It was added to the National Register of Historic Places in 1974.
