= Ralo, Boulkiemdé =

Ralo
- Location in Burkina Faso
- Coordinates: 12°12′N 2°9′W
- Country: Burkina Faso
- Region: Centre-Ouest Region
- Province: Boulkiemdé Province
- Department: Poa Department

Population (2019)
  - Total: 3,190
- Time zone: UTC+0 (GMT 0)

Ralo is a town in the Poa Department of Boulkiemdé Province in central western Burkina Faso.

Population
Year	Pop.	±%
1985	4,020	—
2006	2,947	−26.7%
2019	3,190	+8.2%
