= Manéviré =

Manéviré Manvire
- Interactive map of Manéviré
- Coordinates: 12°27′40″N 2°08′02″W
- Country: Burkina Faso
- Region: Centre-Ouest Region
- Province: Boulkiemdé Province
- Department: Kindi Department

Population (2019)
  - Total: 3,660
- Time zone: UTC+0 (GMT 0)

Manéviré is a town in the Kindi Department of Boulkiemdé Province in central western Burkina Faso.

Population
Year	Pop.	±%
1985	1,316	—
2006	3,021	+129.6%
2019	3,660	+21.2%
