= Kalwaka =

- Location in Burkina Faso
- Country: Burkina Faso
- Region: Centre-Ouest Region
- Province: Boulkiemdé Province
- Department: Soaw Department

Population (2019)
  - Total: 2,526
- Time zone: UTC+0 (GMT 0)

Kalwaka is a town in the Soaw Department of Boulkiemdé Province in central western Burkina Faso.

Population
| Year | Pop. | ±% |
|---|---|---|
| 1985 | 1,269 | — |
| 2006 | 1,930 | +52.1% |
| 2019 | 2,526 | +30.9% |
