= Kaligri =

Kaligri Katigre
- Location in Burkina Faso
- Coordinates: 12°18′N 1°52′W
- Country: Burkina Faso
- Region: Centre-Ouest Region
- Province: Boulkiemdé Province
- Department: Bingo Department

Population (2019)
  - Total: 1,138
- Time zone: UTC+0 (GMT 0)

Kaligri is a town in the Bingo Department of Boulkiemdé Province in central western Burkina Faso.

Population
Year	Pop.	±%
1985	1,242	—
2006	1,136	−8.5%
2019	1,138	+0.2%
