= Kouria =

- Location in Burkina Faso
- Coordinates: 12°33′N 1°56′W
- Country: Burkina Faso
- Region: Centre-Ouest Region
- Province: Boulkiemdé Province
- Department: Siglé Department

Population (2019)
  - Total: 4,489
- Time zone: UTC+0 (GMT 0)

Kouria is a town in the Siglé Department of Boulkiemdé Province in central western Burkina Faso.

Population
Year	Pop.	±%
1985	2,424	—
2006	2,980	+22.9%
2019	4,489	+50.6%
