= Godin-Oualogtinga =

- Location in Burkina Faso
- Coordinates: 12.3779°N 2.3012°W
- Country: Burkina Faso
- Region: Centre-Ouest Region
- Province: Boulkiemdé Province
- Department: Koudougou Department

Population (2019)
  - Total: 6,050

Godin-Oualogtinga is a town in the Koudougou Department of Boulkiemdé Province in central Burkina Faso.

Population
| Year | Pop. | ±% |
|---|---|---|
| 1985 | 3,953 | — |
| 2006 | 5,451 | +37.9% |
| 2019 | 6,050 | +11.0% |
