= Nayalgué =

Nayalgué may refer to:

- Nayalgué, Bazèga, Burkina Faso
- Nayalgué, Boulkiemdé, Burkina Faso
