= Yargo, Boulkiemdé =

Yargo
- Country: Burkina Faso
- Region: Centre-Ouest Region
- Province: Boulkiemdé Province
- Department: Siglé Department

Population (2019)
  - Total: 267
- Time zone: UTC+0 (GMT 0)

Yargo is a village in the Siglé Department of Boulkiemdé Province in central western Burkina Faso.

Population
Year	Pop.	±%
1985	485	—
2006	210	−56.7%
2019	267	+27.1%
