= Gninga =

- Location in Burkina Faso
- Coordinates: 12°22′N 2°14′W
- Country: Burkina Faso
- Region: Centre-Ouest Region
- Province: Boulkiemdé Province
- Department: Koudougou Department

Population (2019)
  - Total: 2,792

Gninga is a town in the Koudougou Department of Boulkiemdé Province in central Burkina Faso.

Population
Year	Pop.	±%
1985	1,694	—
2006	2,782	+64.2%
2019	2,792	+0.4%
