= Loaga =

- Location in Burkina Faso
- Coordinates: 12°14′N 2°4′W
- Country: Burkina Faso
- Region: Centre-Ouest Region
- Province: Boulkiemdé Province
- Department: Poa Department

Population (2019)
  - Total: 5,020
- Time zone: UTC+0 (GMT 0)

Loaga is a town in the Poa Department of Boulkiemdé Province in central western Burkina Faso.

Population
Year	Pop.	±%
1985	4,317	—
2006	4,886	+13.2%
2019	5,020	+2.7%
