= Bangré =

- Country: Burkina Faso
- Region: Centre-Ouest Region
- Province: Boulkiemdé Province
- Department: Thyou Department

Population (2019)
  - Total: 4,049
- Time zone: UTC+0 (GMT 0)

Bangré is a village in the Thyou Department of Boulkiemdé Province in central western Burkina Faso.

Population
Year	Pop.	±%
2006	3,197	—
2019	4,049	+26.6%
