= Poéssé =

- Location in Burkina Faso
- Country: Burkina Faso
- Region: Centre-Ouest Region
- Province: Boulkiemdé Province
- Department: Soaw Department

Population (2019)
  - Total: 4,534
- Time zone: UTC+0 (GMT 0)

Poéssé is a town in the Soaw Department of Boulkiemdé Province in central western Burkina Faso.

Population
Year	Pop.	±%
1985	2,112	—
2006	3,282	+55.4%
2019	4,534	+38.1%
