= Somassi, Boulkiemdé =

Coordinates: 12.5809°N 2.0886°W

Somassi
- Interactive map of Somassi
- Country: Burkina Faso
- Region: Centre-Ouest Region
- Province: Boulkiemdé Province
- Department: Pella Department

Population (2019)
  - Total: 1,314
- Time zone: UTC+0 (GMT 0)

Somassi is a village in the Pella Department of Boulkiemdé Province in central western Burkina Faso.

Population
Year	Pop.	±%
1985	931	—
2006	1,064	+14.3%
2019	1,314	+23.5%
