= Rana, Burkina Faso =

Rana Rama
- Interactive map of Rana
- Country: Burkina Faso
- Region: Centre-Ouest Region
- Province: Boulkiemdé Province
- Department: Imasgho Department

Population (2019)
  - Total: 3,375
- Time zone: UTC+0 (GMT 0)

Rana is a town in the Imasgho Department of Boulkiemdé Province in central western Burkina Faso.

Population
Year	Pop.	±%
1985	2,234	—
2006	2,792	+25.0%
2019	3,375	+20.9%
