= Sakoinsé =

- Location in Burkina Faso
- Coordinates: 12°11′N 1°57′W
- Country: Burkina Faso
- Region: Centre-Ouest Region
- Province: Boulkiemdé Province
- Department: Kokologho Department

Population (2019)
  - Total: 7,827
- Time zone: UTC+0 (GMT 0)

Sakoinsé is a town in the Kokologho Department of Boulkiemdé Province in central western Burkina Faso. The local park is home to the town's skateboarding scene, and features several large half-pipes.

Population
Year	Pop.	±%
1985	5,348	—
2006	6,324	+18.2%
2019	7,827	+23.8%
