= Pitmoaga =

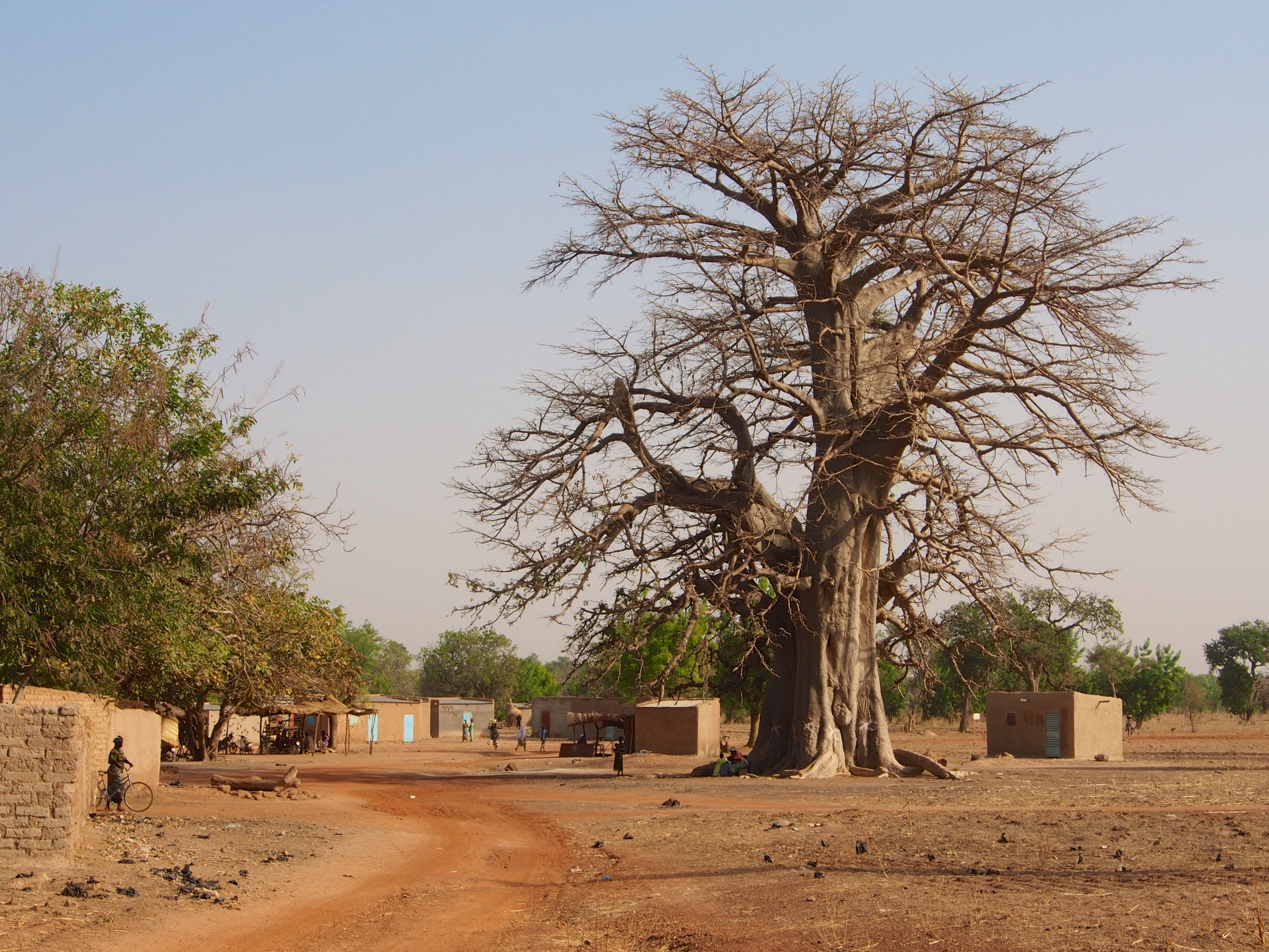
- View of one of the entrance

- Location in Burkina Faso
- Coordinates: 12°14′N 1°52′W
- Country: Burkina Faso
- Region: Centre-Ouest Region
- Province: Boulkiemdé Province
- Department: Kokologho Department

Population (2019)
  - Total: 5,606
- Time zone: UTC+0 (GMT 0)

Pitmoaga is a town in the Kokologho Department of Boulkiemdé Province in central western Burkina Faso.

Population
Year	Pop.	±%
1985	5,932	—
2006	3,634	−38.7%
2019	5,606	+54.3%
