= Silmissin =

- Country: Burkina Faso
- Region: Centre-Ouest Region
- Province: Boulkiemdé Province
- Department: Nandiala Department

Population (2019)
  - Total: 368
- Time zone: UTC+0 (GMT 0)

Silmissin is a village in the Nandiala Department of Boulkiemdé Province in central western Burkina Faso.

Population
Year	Pop.	±%
2006	399	—
2019	368	−7.8%
