= Koulgorin =

- Country: Burkina Faso
- Region: Centre-Ouest Region
- Province: Boulkiemdé Province
- Department: Bingo Department

Population (2019)
  - Total: 2,151
- Time zone: UTC+0 (GMT 0)

Koulgorin is a town in the Bingo Department of Boulkiemdé Province in central western Burkina Faso.

Population
Year	Pop.	±%
1985	2,443	—
2006	1,694	−30.7%
2019	2,151	+27.0%
