= Douré, Boulkiemdé =

Douré
- Location in Burkina Faso
- Coordinates: 12°13′N 1°54′W
- Country: Burkina Faso
- Region: Centre-Ouest Region
- Province: Boulkiemdé Province
- Department: Kokologho Department

Population (2019)
  - Total: 3,805
- Time zone: UTC+0 (GMT 0)

Douré is a town in the Kokologho Department of Boulkiemdé Province in central western Burkina Faso.

Population
Year	Pop.	±%
1985	2,634	—
2006	2,943	+11.7%
2019	3,805	+29.3%
