= Toêga =

Coordinates: 12.3211°N 2.4222°W

- Interactive map of Toêga
- Country: Burkina Faso
- Region: Centre-Ouest Region
- Province: Boulkiemdé Province
- Department: Koudougou Department

Population (2019)
  - Total: 1,208

Toêga is a town in the Koudougou Department of Boulkiemdé Province in central Burkina Faso.

Population
Year	Pop.	±%
1985	1,529	—
2006	1,407	−8.0%
2019	1,208	−14.1%
