= Soula, Boulkiemdé =

Soula
- Location in Burkina Faso
- Coordinates: 12°2′N 2°5′W
- Country: Burkina Faso
- Region: Centre-Ouest Region
- Province: Boulkiemdé Province
- Department: Thyou Department

Population (2019)
  - Total: 4,582
- Time zone: UTC+0 (GMT 0)

Soula is a town in the Thyou Department of Boulkiemdé Province in central western Burkina Faso.

Population
Year	Pop.	±%
1985	3,408	—
2006	3,294	−3.3%
2019	4,582	+39.1%
