= Kandaga =

- Location in Burkina Faso
- Coordinates: 12.5854°N 2.0053°W
- Country: Burkina Faso
- Region: Centre-Ouest Region
- Province: Boulkiemdé Province
- Department: Pella Department

Population (2019)
  - Total: 624
- Time zone: UTC+0 (GMT 0)

Kandaga is a village in the Pella Department of Boulkiemdé Province in central western Burkina Faso.

Population
Year	Pop.	±%
2006	464	—
2019	624	+34.5%
