= Dacissé, Siglé =

Dacissé
- Location in Burkina Faso
- Coordinates: 12°34′N 1°56′W
- Country: Burkina Faso
- Region: Centre-Ouest Region
- Province: Boulkiemdé Province
- Department: Siglé Department

Population (2019)
  - Total: 1,667
- Time zone: UTC+0 (GMT 0)

Dacissé is a town in the Siglé Department of Boulkiemdé Province in central western Burkina Faso.

Population
Year	Pop.	±%
1985	1,117	—
2006	1,368	+22.5%
2019	1,667	+21.9%
