= Séguédin =

Séguédin may refer to:

- Séguédin, Nanoro
- Séguédin, Siglé
- Séguédin, Soaw

== See also ==
- Segedin (disambiguation)
