= Bayandi Tanguin =

- Country: Burkina Faso
- Region: Centre-Ouest Region
- Province: Boulkiemdé Province
- Department: Ramongo Department

Population (2019)
  - Total: 1,036
- Time zone: UTC+0 (GMT 0)

Bayandi Tanguin is a town in the Ramongo Department of Boulkiemdé Province in central western Burkina Faso.

Population
Year	Pop.	±%
1985	1,041	—
2006	891	−14.4%
2019	1,036	+16.3%
