= Villy, Burkina Faso =

- Location in Burkina Faso
- Coordinates: 12°17′N 2°13′W
- Country: Burkina Faso
- Region: Centre-Ouest Region
- Province: Boulkiemdé Province
- Department: Koudougou Department
- Elevation: 285 m (935 ft)

Population (2012)
  - Total: 20,914

Villy is a town in the Koudougou Department of Boulkiemdé Province in central Burkina Faso. The town has a population of 2,813.
