= Bayandi Palogo =

Bayandi Palogo Bayendi Paloga
- Country: Burkina Faso
- Region: Centre-Ouest Region
- Province: Boulkiemdé Province
- Department: Ramongo Department

Population (2019)
  - Total: 1,345
- Time zone: UTC+0 (GMT 0)

Bayandi Palogo is a town in the Ramongo Department of Boulkiemdé Province in central western Burkina Faso.

Population
Year	Pop.	±%
1985	822	—
2006	976	+18.7%
2019	1,345	+37.8%
