= Bisraaga =

- Country: Burkina Faso
- Region: Centre-Ouest Region
- Province: Boulkiemdé Province
- Department: Bingo Department

Population (2019)
  - Total: 481
- Time zone: UTC+0 (GMT 0)

Bisraaga is a village in the Bingo Department of Boulkiemdé Province in central western Burkina Faso.

Population
Year	Pop.	±%
2006	668	—
2019	481	−28.0%
