= Guirgo =

Guirgo may refer to:

- Guirgo, Bazèga, Burkina Faso
- Guirgo, Boulkiemdé, Burkina Faso
