= Zékemzougou =

Zékemzougou Zikemzangou
- Location in Burkina Faso
- Coordinates: 12°19′22″N 1°56′58″W
- Country: Burkina Faso
- Region: Centre-Ouest Region
- Province: Boulkiemdé Province
- Department: Bingo Department

Population (2019)
  - Total: 1,135
- Time zone: UTC+0 (GMT 0)

Zékemzougou is a town in the Bingo Department of Boulkiemdé Province in central western Burkina Faso.

Population
| Year | Pop. | ±% |
|---|---|---|
| 1985 | 691 | — |
| 2006 | 1,094 | +58.3% |
| 2019 | 1,135 | +3.7% |
