= Bouloum Nabyiri =

Bouloum Nabyiri Bouloum Nabiyiri
- Location in Burkina Faso
- Coordinates: 12°12′N 2°15′W
- Country: Burkina Faso
- Region: Centre-Ouest Region
- Province: Boulkiemdé Province
- Department: Ramongo Department

Population (2019)
  - Total: 2,884
- Time zone: UTC+0 (GMT 0)

Bouloum Nabyiri is a town in the Ramongo Department of Boulkiemdé Province in central western Burkina Faso.

Population
Year	Pop.	±%
1985	1,697	—
2006	1,286	−24.2%
2019	2,884	+124.3%
