= Yaoguin =

Yaoguin Yarguin
- Location in Burkina Faso
- Coordinates: 12°14′N 2°6′W
- Country: Burkina Faso
- Region: Centre-Ouest Region
- Province: Boulkiemdé Province
- Department: Poa Department

Population (2019)
  - Total: 4,085
- Time zone: UTC+0 (GMT 0)

Yaoguin is a town in the Poa Department of Boulkiemdé Province in central western Burkina Faso.

Population
Year	Pop.	±%
1985	2,579	—
2006	3,481	+35.0%
2019	4,085	+17.4%
