= Kabinou =

- Location in Burkina Faso
- Coordinates: 12°11′N 2°17′W
- Country: Burkina Faso
- Region: Centre-Ouest Region
- Province: Boulkiemdé Province
- Department: Ramongo Department

Population (2019)
  - Total: 2,066
- Time zone: UTC+0 (GMT 0)

Kabinou is a town in the Ramongo Department of Boulkiemdé Province in central western Burkina Faso.

Population
Year	Pop.	±%
1985	1,808	—
2006	2,291	+26.7%
2019	2,066	−9.8%
