= Soaw =

Soaw may refer to:

- Soaw, Burkina Faso, a town in Boulkiemdé Province, Burkina Faso
- Soaw Department, a department of Boulkiemdé Province, Burkina Faso
- School of the Americas Watch, an American political advocacy group
