= Somé =

- Location in Burkina Faso
- Coordinates: 12°23′N 2°13′W
- Country: Burkina Faso
- Region: Centre-Ouest Region
- Province: Boulkiemdé Province
- Department: Nandiala Department

Population (2019)
  - Total: 4,245
- Time zone: UTC+0 (GMT 0)

Somé is a town in the Nandiala Department of Boulkiemdé Province in central western Burkina Faso.

Population
Year	Pop.	±%
1985	2,293	—
2006	2,995	+30.6%
2019	4,245	+41.7%
