= Moungounissi =

- Location in Burkina Faso
- Coordinates: 12°9′N 2°10′W
- Country: Burkina Faso
- Region: Centre-Ouest Region
- Province: Boulkiemdé Province
- Department: Poa Department

Population (2019)
  - Total: 1,210
- Time zone: UTC+0 (GMT 0)

Moungounissi is a town in the Poa Department of Boulkiemdé Province in central western Burkina Faso.

Population
Year	Pop.	±%
2006	1,095	—
2019	1,210	+10.5%
