= Gogo, Boulkiemdé =

Gogo
- Location in Burkina Faso
- Coordinates: 12°8′N 2°11′W
- Country: Burkina Faso
- Region: Centre-Ouest Region
- Province: Boulkiemdé Province
- Department: Poa Department

Population (2019)
  - Total: 3,154
- Time zone: UTC+0 (GMT 0)

Gogo is a town in the Poa Department of Boulkiemdé Province in central western Burkina Faso.

Population
Year	Pop.	±%
1985	2,753	—
2006	2,971	+7.9%
2019	3,154	+6.2%
