= Tatyou =

- Country: Burkina Faso
- Region: Centre-Ouest Region
- Province: Boulkiemdé Province
- Department: Thyou Department

Population (2019)
  - Total: 898
- Time zone: UTC+0 (GMT 0)

Tatyou is a village in the Thyou Department of Boulkiemdé Province in central western Burkina Faso.

Population
Year	Pop.	±%
2006	745	—
2019	898	+20.5%
