= Kanyalé =

- Country: Burkina Faso
- Region: Centre-Ouest Region
- Province: Boulkiemdé Province
- Department: Imasgho Department

Population (2019)
  - Total: 1,717
- Time zone: UTC+0 (GMT 0)

Kanyalé is a town in the Imasgho Department of Boulkiemdé Province in central western Burkina Faso.

Population
Year	Pop.	±%
1985	1,522	—
2006	1,864	+22.5%
2019	1,717	−7.9%
