= Godo, Pella =

Godo
- Location in Burkina Faso
- Coordinates: 12°36′N 1°58′W
- Country: Burkina Faso
- Region: Centre-Ouest Region
- Province: Boulkiemdé Province
- Department: Pella Department

Population (2019)
  - Total: 1,902
- Time zone: UTC+0 (GMT 0240)

Godo is a town in the Pella Department of Boulkiemdé Province in central western Burkina Faso.

Population
| Year | Pop. | ±% |
|---|---|---|
| 1985 | 1,263 | — |
| 2006 | 1,543 | +22.2% |
| 2019 | 1,902 | +23.3% |
