= Palagré =

Coordinates: 12°36′N 1°51′W

- Interactive map of Palagré
- Country: Burkina Faso
- Region: Centre-Ouest Region
- Province: Boulkiemdé Province
- Department: Siglé Department

Population (2019)
  - Total: 295
- Time zone: UTC+0 (GMT 0)

Palagré is a village in the Siglé Department of Boulkiemdé Province in central western Burkina Faso.

Population
Year	Pop.	±%
2006	266	—
2019	295	+10.9%
