= Mongdin =

- Location in Burkina Faso
- Country: Burkina Faso
- Region: Centre-Ouest Region
- Province: Boulkiemdé Province
- Department: Soaw Department

Population (2019)
  - Total: 894
- Time zone: UTC+0 (GMT 0)

Mongdin is a village in the Soaw Department of Boulkiemdé Province in central western Burkina Faso.

Population
Year	Pop.	±%
2006	775	—
2019	894	+15.4%
