= Noéssin =

Noéssin Noesen
- Location in Burkina Faso
- Coordinates: 12°10′N 2°12′W
- Country: Burkina Faso
- Region: Centre-Ouest Region
- Province: Boulkiemdé Province
- Department: Poa Department

Population (2019)
  - Total: 1,472
- Time zone: UTC+0 (GMT 0)

Noéssin is a town in the Poa Department of Boulkiemdé Province in central western Burkina Faso.

Population
Year	Pop.	±%
1985	813	—
2006	1,060	+30.4%
2019	1,472	+38.9%
