= Sarana, Pella =

Sarana
- Location in Burkina Faso
- Coordinates: 12°36′N 2°6′W
- Country: Burkina Faso
- Region: Centre-Ouest Region
- Province: Boulkiemdé Province
- Department: Pella Department

Population (2019)
  - Total: 2,309
- Time zone: UTC+0 (GMT 0)

Sarana is a town in the Pella Department of Boulkiemdé Province in central western Burkina Faso.

Population
Year	Pop.	±%
1985	1,190	—
2006	1,729	+45.3%
2019	2,309	+33.5%
