= Salbisgo-Dapoya =

- Location in Burkina Faso
- Coordinates: 12°12′N 2°19′W
- Country: Burkina Faso
- Region: Centre-Ouest Region
- Province: Boulkiemdé Province
- Department: Ramongo Department

Population (2019)
  - Total: 2,448
- Time zone: UTC+0 (GMT 0)

Salbisgo-Dapoya is a town in the Ramongo Department of Boulkiemdé Province in central western Burkina Faso.

Population
Year	Pop.	±%
2006	4,566	—
2019	2,448	−46.4%
