= Martin Zongo =

Burkinabé professor

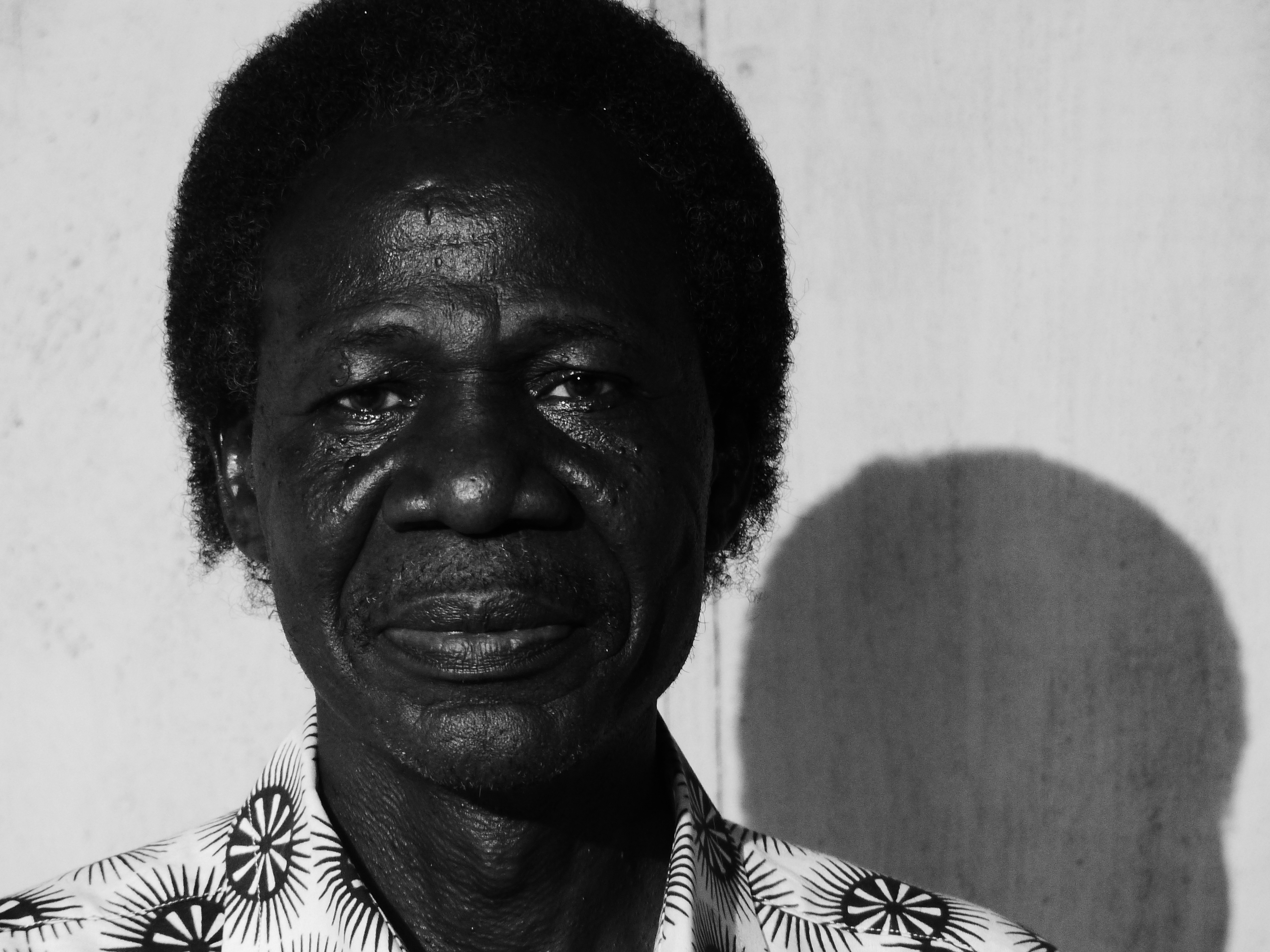
- Born: Gouim, Boulkiemdé, Burkina Faso
- Education: Modern Literature
- Occupations: Cultural administrator, theatre professor
- Employer: Carrefour international de théâtre de Ouagadougou
- Known for: Cultural administration, theatre

Martin Zongo (born 1957 in Gouim, Boulkiemdé, Burkina Faso) is a Burkinabé cultural figure, professor, cultural administrator, and member of the economic and social council of Burkina Faso. He is the administrator of the Carrefour international de théâtre de Ouagadougou (CITO).

== Biography ==
=== Academic background ===
After primary school in Imasgo, Réo, and Temnaoré, then in Koudougou, from 1963 to 1969, Martin Zongo joined the juvenile center of Saaba. He remained there until 1972. He obtained his certificate of secondary education in 1974 at the college de la Salle in Ouagadougou, then the baccalaureate in Bobo-Dioulasso at the Ouezzin Coulibaly high school. Martin Zongo holds a master's degree in modern literature, obtained at the University of Ouagadougou in 1982.

=== Career ===
Martin Zongo was director of studies at the private Louis Pasteur College, then French professor at the Lycée de Pô, from 1982 to 1984. Then, in the following two years, during President Thomas Sankara's revolution, he was High Commissioner of Nahouri and then Boulgou provinces. In 1987, he was appointed secretary-general of the National Commission for UNESCO in Burkina Faso, a position he held until 1991.

In 1994, he became the administrator of the Fraternity Theater founded by Professor Jean Pierre Guingané. It was during this period that he was secretary-general of the International Theater and Puppet Festival of Ouagadougou.

Since 2002, he has been the administrator of the Carrefour international de théâtre de Ouagadougou.

== Awards ==
- 1983: 3rd Prize Theater at the Grand National Literature Prize
