= Sapelo, Burkina Faso =

Sapelo
- Location in Burkina Faso
- Coordinates: 12°20′N 1°48′W
- Country: Burkina Faso
- Region: Centre-Ouest Region
- Province: Boulkiemdé Province
- Department: Bingo Department

Population (2019)
  - Total: 532
- Time zone: UTC+0 (GMT 0)

Sapelo is a village in the Bingo Department of Boulkiemdé Province in central western Burkina Faso.

Population
| Year | Pop. | ±% |
|---|---|---|
| 1985 | 390 | — |
| 2006 | 457 | +17.2% |
| 2019 | 532 | +16.4% |
