= Kougsin =

- Location in Burkina Faso
- Coordinates: 12°6′N 2°17′W
- Country: Burkina Faso
- Region: Centre-Ouest Region
- Province: Boulkiemdé Province
- Department: Sourgou Department

Population (2019)
  - Total: 2,183
- Time zone: UTC+0 (GMT 0)

Kougsin is a town in the Sourgou Department of Boulkiemdé Province in central western Burkina Faso.

Population
Year	Pop.	±%
2006	1,313	—
2019	2,183	+66.3%
