= Kolokom =

- Location in Burkina Faso
- Country: Burkina Faso
- Region: Centre-Ouest Region
- Province: Boulkiemdé Province
- Department: Soaw Department

Population (2019)
  - Total: 1,030
- Time zone: UTC+0 (GMT 0)

Kolokom is a village in the Soaw Department of Boulkiemdé Province in central western Burkina Faso.

Population
Year	Pop.	±%
1985	202	—
2006	499	+147.0%
2019	1,030	+106.4%
