= Makoula =

Makoula Mankoula
- Location in Burkina Faso
- Coordinates: 12°36′N 1°53′W
- Country: Burkina Faso
- Region: Centre-Ouest Region
- Province: Boulkiemdé Province
- Department: Siglé Department

Population (2019)
  - Total: 2,414
- Time zone: UTC+0 (GMT 0)

Makoula is a town in the Siglé Department of Boulkiemdé Province in central western Burkina Faso.

Population
Year	Pop.	±%
1985	3,092	—
2006	2,027	−34.4%
2019	2,414	+19.1%
