= Yargo-Yarcés =

- Location in Burkina Faso
- Coordinates: 12°13′N 2°5′W
- Country: Burkina Faso
- Region: Centre-Ouest Region
- Province: Boulkiemdé Province
- Department: Poa Department

Population (2019)
  - Total: 1,926
- Time zone: UTC+0 (GMT 0)

Yargo-Yarcés is a town in the Poa Department of Boulkiemdé Province in central western Burkina Faso.

Population
Year	Pop.	±%
1985	1,291	—
2006	1,720	+33.2%
2019	1,926	+12.0%
