= Koné, Burkina Faso =

Koné
- Location in Burkina Faso
- Coordinates: 12°22′N 2°4′W
- Country: Burkina Faso
- Region: Centre-Ouest Region
- Province: Boulkiemdé Province
- Department: Kindi Department

Population (2019)
  - Total: 7,296
- Time zone: UTC+0 (GMT 0)

Koné is a town in the Kindi Department of Boulkiemdé Province in central western Burkina Faso.

Population
Year	Pop.	±%
1985	3,801	—
2006	6,054	+59.3%
2019	7,296	+20.5%
