= Masséré =

- Country: Burkina Faso
- Region: Centre-Ouest Region
- Province: Boulkiemdé Province
- Department: Kindi Department

Population (2019)
  - Total: 1,961
- Time zone: UTC+0 (GMT 0)

Masséré is a town in the Kindi Department of Boulkiemdé Province in central western Burkina Faso.

Population
Year	Pop.	±%
1985	1,018	—
2006	2,061	+102.5%
2019	1,961	−4.9%
