= 2023 Zorkoum attack =

2023 battle in Burkina Faso

- Part of Jihadist insurgency in Burkina Faso
Date	March 21, 2023
Location	Zorkoum, Centre-Ouest, Burkina Faso

Belligerents
Burkina Faso: Burkina Faso Armed Forces; Volunteers for the Defense of the Homeland	Jama'at Nasr al-Islam wal Muslimin

Casualties and losses
14 killed	~20 killed

On March 21, 2023, jihadists from Jama'at Nasr al-Islam wal-Muslimin attacked a Burkinabe base in Zorkoum, Centre-Ouest, killing fourteen soldiers and pro-government militiamen dead along with twenty jihadists dead.

== Background ==
Much of northern Burkina Faso has been the frontline of an insurgency waged by Jama'at Nasr al-Islam wal-Muslimin and the Islamic State in the Greater Sahara since 2015, with these groups intensifying their attacks on civilians seen as sympathetic to the government since 2019. These jihadist groups had been known to invade towns near Kaya, including Zorkoum, multiple times over the past few years demanding zakat.

== Attack ==
The attack took place at a barracks for the VDP, a pro-government civilian militia group. The unit had been responsible for providing security to workers fixing water supplies for the city of Kaya. Four Burkinabe soldiers and ten VDP were killed in the attack, according to France 24 citing local sources. Around twenty jihadists were reported killed by Burkinabe authorities as well.

JNIM claimed responsibility for the attack on April 19, along with a second attack in Zorkoum on April 10 that killed several soldiers and militants while the former were traveling to Bittou.
