= Bingo, Burkina Faso =

Bingo may refer to:

- Bingo Department, Burkina Faso
- Bingo, Boulkiemdé, Burkina Faso – the capital of Bingo Department
- Bingo, Boulgou, Burkina Faso
