= Balogho =

- Location in Burkina Faso
- Coordinates: 12.513802°N 1.933036°W
- Country: Burkina Faso
- Region: Centre-Ouest Region
- Province: Boulkiemdé Province
- Department: Siglé Department

Population (2019)
  - Total: 1,571
- Time zone: UTC+0 (GMT 0)

Balogho is a town in the Siglé Department of Boulkiemdé Province in central western Burkina Faso.

Population
| Year | Pop. | ±% |
|---|---|---|
| 2006 | 1,969 | — |
| 2019 | 1,571 | −20.2% |
