= Guillé =

- Location in Burkina Faso
- Coordinates: 12°20′N 1°50′W
- Country: Burkina Faso
- Region: Centre-Ouest Region
- Province: Boulkiemdé Province
- Department: Bingo Department

Population (2019)
  - Total: 888
- Time zone: UTC+0 (GMT 0)

Guillé is a town in the Bingo Department of Boulkiemdé Province in central western Burkina Faso.

Population
Year	Pop.	±%
1985	743	—
2006	933	+25.6%
2019	888	−4.8%
