= Nassoulou =

- Location in Burkina Faso
- Coordinates: 12°21′N 2°7′W
- Country: Burkina Faso
- Region: Centre-Ouest Region
- Province: Boulkiemdé Province
- Department: Kindi Department

Population (2019)
  - Total: 8,625
- Time zone: UTC+0 (GMT 0)

Nassoulou is a town in the Kindi Department of Boulkiemdé Province in central western Burkina Faso.

Population
Year	Pop.	±%
1985	5,061	—
2006	7,142	+41.1%
2019	8,625	+20.8%
