= Kolgrogogo =

Kolgrogogo Kologrogogo
- Country: Burkina Faso
- Region: Centre-Ouest Region
- Province: Boulkiemdé Province
- Department: Koudougou Department

Population (2019)
  - Total: 704

Kolgrogogo is a town in the Koudougou Department of Boulkiemdé Province in central Burkina Faso.

Population
| Year | Pop. | ±% |
|---|---|---|
| 1985 | 408 | — |
| 2006 | 605 | +48.3% |
| 2019 | 704 | +16.4% |
