= Tio, Burkina Faso =

Tio
- Location in Burkina Faso
- Coordinates: 12°28′N 1°51′W
- Country: Burkina Faso
- Region: Centre-Ouest Region
- Province: Boulkiemdé Province
- Department: Siglé Department

Population (2019)
  - Total: 1,305
- Time zone: UTC+0 (GMT 0)

Tio is a town in the Siglé Department of Boulkiemdé Province in central western Burkina Faso.

Population
Year	Pop.	±%
1985	833	—
2006	1,393	+67.2%
2019	1,305	−6.3%
