= Nidaga =

- Location in Burkina Faso
- Coordinates: 12°4′N 1°59′W
- Country: Burkina Faso
- Region: Centre-Ouest Region
- Province: Boulkiemdé Province
- Department: Kokologho Department

Population (2019)
  - Total: 2,012
- Time zone: UTC+0 (GMT 0)

Nidaga is a town in the Kokologho Department of Boulkiemdé Province in central western Burkina Faso.

Population
Year	Pop.	±%
1985	1,302	—
2006	1,620	+24.4%
2019	2,012	+24.2%
