= Rihalo =

- Location in Burkina Faso
- Coordinates: 12°27′N 2°12′W
- Country: Burkina Faso
- Region: Centre-Ouest Region
- Province: Boulkiemdé Province
- Department: Nandiala Department

Population (2019)
  - Total: 1,630
- Time zone: UTC+0 (GMT)

Rihalo is a town in the Nandiala Department of Boulkiemdé Province in central western Burkina Faso.

Population
Year	Pop.	±%
1985	600	—
2006	1,044	+74.0%
2019	1,630	+56.1%
