= Kirguilounga =

- Location in Burkina Faso
- Coordinates: 12.6123°N 2.0530°W
- Country: Burkina Faso
- Region: Centre-Ouest Region
- Province: Boulkiemdé Province
- Department: Pella Department

Population (2019)
  - Total: 1,614
- Time zone: UTC+0 (GMT 0)

Kirguilounga is a town in the Pella Department of Boulkiemdé Province in central western Burkina Faso.

Population
Year	Pop.	±%
1985	1,007	—
2006	1,328	+31.9%
2019	1,614	+21.5%
