= Niangdo =

Niangdo Niangado
- Location in Burkina Faso
- Coordinates: 12°16′00″N 2°04′00″W
- Country: Burkina Faso
- Region: Centre-Ouest Region
- Province: Boulkiemdé Province
- Department: Poa Department

Population (2019)
  - Total: 2,913
- Time zone: UTC+0 (GMT 0)

Niangdo is a town in the Poa Department of Boulkiemdé Province in central western Burkina Faso.

Population
Year	Pop.	±%
1985	2,693	—
2006	3,419	+27.0%
2019	2,913	−14.8%
