= Doulou =

- Location in Burkina Faso
- Coordinates: 12°19′N 2°17′W
- Country: Burkina Faso
- Region: Centre-Ouest Region
- Province: Boulkiemdé Province
- Department: Koudougou Department

Population (2019)
  - Total: 4,747

Doulou is a town in the Koudougou Department of Boulkiemdé Province in central Burkina Faso.

Population
Year	Pop.	±%
1985	3,012	—
2006	4,052	+34.5%
2019	4,747	+17.2%
