= Gourongo =

- Location in Burkina Faso
- Coordinates: 12°19′N 2°09′W
- Country: Burkina Faso
- Region: Centre-Ouest Region
- Province: Boulkiemdé Province
- Department: Nandiala Department

Population (2019)
  - Total: 2,121
- Time zone: UTC+0 (GMT 0)

Gourongo is a town in the Nandiala Department of Boulkiemdé Province in central western Burkina Faso.

Population
Year	Pop.	±%
2006	1,897	—
2019	2,121	+11.8%
