= Daurnogomdé =

Daurnogomdé Dawanegomde, Daumogomde, Dawaningomde
- Location in Burkina Faso
- Coordinates: 12°33′N 1°50′W
- Country: Burkina Faso
- Region: Centre-Ouest Region
- Province: Boulkiemdé Province
- Department: Siglé Department

Population (2019)
  - Total: 829
- Time zone: UTC+0 (GMT 0)

Daurnogomdé is a village in the Siglé Department of Boulkiemdé Province in central western Burkina Faso.

Population
Year	Pop.	±%
1985	895	—
2006	604	−32.5%
2019	829	+37.3%
