= Sogpelcé =

Sogpelcé may refer to:

- Sogpelcé, Poa
- Sogpelcé, Thyou
