= Koulnatenga =

Koulnatenga Koulnatinga
- Location in Burkina Faso
- Coordinates: 12°12′N 1°59′W
- Country: Burkina Faso
- Region: Centre-Ouest Region
- Province: Boulkiemdé Province
- Department: Kokologho Department

Population (2019)
  - Total: 910
- Time zone: UTC+0 (GMT 0)

Koulnatenga is a village in the Kokologho Department of Boulkiemdé Province in central western Burkina Faso.

Population
Year	Pop.	±%
1985	389	—
2006	710	+82.5%
2019	910	+28.2%
