= Babouli =

- Location in Burkina Faso
- Coordinates: 12.6382°N 2.0081°W
- Country: Burkina Faso
- Region: Centre-Ouest Region
- Province: Boulkiemdé Province
- Department: Pella Department

Population (2019)
  - Total: 655
- Time zone: UTC+0 (GMT 0)

Babouli is a town in the Pella Department of Boulkiemdé Province in central western Burkina Faso.

Population
Year	Pop.	±%
2006	471	—
2019	655	+39.1%
