= Kolonkandé =

- Location in Burkina Faso
- Coordinates: 12°12′N 2°15′W
- Country: Burkina Faso
- Region: Centre-Ouest Region
- Province: Boulkiemdé Province
- Department: Ramongo Department

Population (2005)
  - Total: 3,579
- Time zone: UTC+0 (GMT 0)

Kolonkandé is a town in the Ramongo Department of Boulkiemdé Province in central western Burkina Faso. It has a population of 3,579.
