= Nabziniguima =

Nabziniguima Nabzinigma
- Location in Burkina Faso
- Coordinates: 12.6250°N 2.0129°W
- Country: Burkina Faso
- Region: Centre-Ouest Region
- Province: Boulkiemdé Province
- Department: Pella Department

Population (2019)
  - Total: 1,139
- Time zone: UTC+0 (GMT 0)

Nabziniguima is a town in the Pella Department of Boulkiemdé Province in central western Burkina Faso.

Population
Year	Pop.	±%
1985	522	—
2006	841	+61.1%
2019	1,139	+35.4%
