= Nafougo =

Nafougo Nafourgou, Nafourgo
- Location in Burkina Faso
- Coordinates: 12°31′N 1°51′W
- Country: Burkina Faso
- Region: Centre-Ouest Region
- Province: Boulkiemdé Province
- Department: Siglé Department

Population (2019)
  - Total: 281
- Time zone: UTC+0 (GMT 0)

Nafougo is a village in the Siglé Department of Boulkiemdé Province in central western Burkina Faso.

Population
Year	Pop.	±%
1985	186	—
2006	243	+30.6%
2019	281	+15.6%
