= Boukou =

- Country: Burkina Faso
- Region: Centre-Ouest Region
- Province: Boulkiemdé Province
- Department: Siglé Department

Population (2019)
  - Total: 1,242
- Time zone: UTC+0 (GMT 0)

Boukou is a town in the Siglé Department of Boulkiemdé Province in central western Burkina Faso.

Population
Year	Pop.	±%
1985	622	—
2006	1,055	+69.6%
2019	1,242	+17.7%
