= Saria, Burkina Faso =

Saria
- Location in Burkina Faso
- Coordinates: 12°16′N 2°9′W
- Country: Burkina Faso
- Region: Centre-Ouest Region
- Province: Boulkiemdé Province
- Department: Koudougou Department

Population (2019)
  - Total: 3,182

Saria, Burkina Faso is a town in the Koudougou Department of Boulkiemdé Province in central Burkina Faso.

Population
Year	Pop.	±%
1985	3,818	—
2006	3,195	−16.3%
2019	3,182	−0.4%
