= Lallé, Boulkiemdé =

Lallé
- Location in Burkina Faso
- Coordinates: 12°35′N 1°51′W
- Country: Burkina Faso
- Region: Centre-Ouest Region
- Province: Boulkiemdé Province
- Department: Siglé Department

Population (2019)
  - Total: 2,735
- Time zone: UTC+0 (GMT 0)

Lallé is a town in the Siglé Department of Boulkiemdé Province in central western Burkina Faso.

Population
Year	Pop.	±%
1985	1,667	—
2006	2,104	+26.2%
2019	2,735	+30.0%
