= Ouoro =

- Location in Burkina Faso
- Coordinates: 12°3′N 2°25′W
- Country: Burkina Faso
- Region: Centre-Ouest Region
- Province: Boulkiemdé Province
- Department: Sourgou Department

Population (2019)
  - Total: 4,060
- Time zone: UTC+0 (GMT 0)

Ouoro is a town in the Sourgou Department of Boulkiemdé Province in central western Burkina Faso.

Population
Year	Pop.	±%
1985	2,703	—
2006	3,491	+29.2%
2019	4,060	+16.3%
