= Sâ =

- Location in Burkina Faso
- Coordinates: 12°19′N 1°51′W
- Country: Burkina Faso
- Region: Centre-Ouest Region
- Province: Boulkiemdé Province
- Department: Bingo Department

Population (2019)
  - Total: 1,362
- Time zone: UTC+0 (GMT 0)

Sâ is a town in the Bingo Department of Boulkiemdé Province in central western Burkina Faso.

Population
Year	Pop.	±%
1985	1,131	—
2006	1,438	+27.1%
2019	1,362	−5.3%
