= Manega =

Manega Menega
- Country: Burkina Faso
- Region: Centre-Ouest Region
- Province: Boulkiemdé Province
- Department: Kokologho Department

Population (2019)
  - Total: 2,267
- Time zone: UTC+0 (GMT 0)

Manega or Menega is a town in the Kokologho Department of Boulkiemdé Province in central western Burkina Faso. It has a population of 1,991.

Population
Year	Pop.	±%
1985	1,764	—
2006	1,809	+2.6%
2019	2,267	+25.3%
