= Boulsin =

Boulsin may refer to:

- Boulsin, Bazèga, Burkina Faso
- Boulsin, Boulkiemdé, Burkina Faso
