= Bayandi Nabyiri =

- Country: Burkina Faso
- Region: Centre-Ouest Region
- Province: Boulkiemdé Province
- Department: Ramongo Department

Population (2019)
  - Total: 2,340
- Time zone: UTC+0 (GMT 0)

Bayandi Nabyiri is a town in the Ramongo Department of Boulkiemdé Province in central western Burkina Faso.

Population
Year	Pop.	±%
1985	1,210	—
2006	1,687	+39.4%
2019	2,340	+38.7%
