= Bologo =

- Location in Burkina Faso
- Coordinates: 12°02′N 0°16′W
- Country: Burkina Faso
- Region: Centre-Ouest Region
- Province: Boulkiemdé Province
- Department: Siglé Department

Population (2019)
  - Total: 6,590
- Time zone: UTC+0 (GMT 0)

for the sub-prefecture of Chad, see Bologo, Chad.

Bologo is a town in the Siglé Department of Boulkiemdé Province in central western Burkina Faso.

Population
Year	Pop.	±%
1985	4,370	—
2006	4,681	+7.1%
2019	6,590	+40.8%
