= Palilgogo =

- Country: Burkina Faso
- Region: Centre-Ouest Region
- Province: Boulkiemdé Province
- Department: Siglé Department

Population (2019)
  - Total: 645
- Time zone: UTC+0 (GMT 0)

Palilgogo is a village in the Siglé Department of Boulkiemdé Province in central western Burkina Faso.

Population
Year	Pop.	±%
1985	313	—
2006	595	+90.1%
2019	645	+8.4%
