= Salgisgo-Itaoré =

- Country: Burkina Faso
- Region: Centre-Ouest Region
- Province: Boulkiemdé Province
- Department: Ramongo Department

Population (2019)
  - Total: 4,552
- Time zone: UTC+0 (GMT 0)

Salgisgo-Itaoré is a town in the Ramongo Department of Boulkiemdé Province in central western Burkina Faso.

Population
Year	Pop.	±%
2006	881	—
2019	4,552	+416.7%
