= Pelbilin =

- Interactive map of Pelbilin
- Coordinates: 12°35′N 2°2′W
- Country: Burkina Faso
- Region: Centre-Ouest Region
- Province: Boulkiemdé Province
- Department: Pella Department

Population (2019)
  - Total: 907
- Time zone: UTC+0 (GMT 0)

Pelbilin is a town in the Pella Department of Boulkiemdé Province in central western Burkina Faso.

Population
Year	Pop.	±%
2006	594	—
2019	907	+52.7%
