= Koanga, Burkina Faso =

Koanga Kouanga
- town
- Country: Burkina Faso
- Region: Centre-Ouest Region
- Province: Boulkiemdé Province
- Department: Bingo Department

Population (2019)
  - Total: 1,547
- Time zone: UTC+0 (GMT 0)

Koanga is a town in the Bingo Department of Boulkiemdé Province in central western Burkina Faso.

Population
Year	Pop.	±%
1985	1,016	—
2006	1,393	+37.1%
2019	1,547	+11.1%
