= Lounga =

- Location in Burkina Faso
- Country: Burkina Faso
- Region: Centre-Ouest Region
- Province: Boulkiemdé Province
- Department: Imasgho Department

Population (2019)
  - Total: 2,175
- Time zone: UTC+0 (GMT 0)

Lounga is a town in the Imasgho Department of Boulkiemdé Province in central western Burkina Faso.

Population
Year	Pop.	±%
1985	814	—
2006	1,984	+143.7%
2019	2,175	+9.6%
