= Ouéra =

- Country: Burkina Faso
- Region: Centre-Ouest Region
- Province: Boulkiemdé Province
- Department: Imasgho Department

Population (2019)
  - Total: 1,700
- Time zone: UTC+0 (GMT 0)

Ouéra is a town in the Imasgho Department of Boulkiemdé Province in central western Burkina Faso.

Population
Year	Pop.	±%
1985	1,123	—
2006	1,693	+50.8%
2019	1,700	+0.4%
