= Kamsé =

- Location in Burkina Faso
- Coordinates: 12°3′N 2°5′W
- Country: Burkina Faso
- Region: Centre-Ouest Region
- Province: Boulkiemdé Province
- Department: Thyou Department

Population (2019)
  - Total: 2,077
- Time zone: UTC+0 (GMT 0)

Kamsé is a town in the Thyou Department of Boulkiemdé Province in central western Burkina Faso.

Population
Year	Pop.	±%
2006	1,538	—
2019	2,077	+35.0%
