= Rogho =

- Location in Burkina Faso
- Coordinates: 12°5′N 2°12′W
- Country: Burkina Faso
- Region: Centre-Ouest Region
- Province: Boulkiemdé Province
- Department: Sourgou Department

Population (2019)
  - Total: 3,700
- Time zone: UTC+0 (GMT 0)

Rogho is a town in the Sourgou Department of Boulkiemdé Province in central western Burkina Faso.

Population
Year	Pop.	±%
1985	2,282	—
2006	2,846	+24.7%
2019	3,700	+30.0%
