= Tia, Burkina Faso =

Tia
- Location in Burkina Faso
- Coordinates: 12°31′N 1°49′W
- Country: Burkina Faso
- Region: Centre-Ouest Region
- Province: Boulkiemdé Province
- Department: Siglé Department

Population (2019)
  - Total: 1,066
- Time zone: UTC+0 (GMT 0)

Tia is a village in the Siglé Department of Boulkiemdé Province in central western Burkina Faso.

Population
Year	Pop.	±%
1985	607	—
2006	843	+38.9%
2019	1,066	+26.5%
