= Bokin, Boulkiemdé =

Coordinates: 12.54085°N 2.21866°W

Bokin
- Interactive map of Bokin
- Country: Burkina Faso
- Region: Centre-Ouest Region
- Province: Boulkiemdé Province
- Department: Soaw Department

Population (2019)
  - Total: 299
- Time zone: UTC+0 (GMT 0)

Bokin is a village in the Soaw Department of Boulkiemdé Province in central western Burkina Faso.

Population
| Year | Pop. | ±% |
|---|---|---|
| 1985 | 143 | — |
| 2006 | 229 | +60.1% |
| 2019 | 299 | +30.6% |
