= Lattou =

Lattou Latou
- Location in Burkina Faso
- Coordinates: 12°18′N 2°22′W
- Country: Burkina Faso
- Region: Centre-Ouest Region
- Province: Boulkiemdé Province
- Department: Koudougou Department

Population (2019)
  - Total: 2,979

Lattou is a town in the Koudougou Department of Boulkiemdé Province in central Burkina Faso.

Population
Year	Pop.	±%
1985	2,152	—
2006	3,055	+42.0%
2019	2,979	−2.5%
