= Ramongo-Tanguin =

- Country: Burkina Faso
- Region: Centre-Ouest Region
- Province: Boulkiemdé Province
- Department: Ramongo Department

Population (2019)
  - Total: 3,332
- Time zone: UTC+0 (GMT 0)

Ramongo-Tanguin is a town in the Ramongo Department of Boulkiemdé Province in central western Burkina Faso.

Population
| Year | Pop. | ±% |
|---|---|---|
| 1985 | 1,852 | — |
| 2006 | 2,719 | +46.8% |
| 2019 | 3,332 | +22.5% |
