= Villa, Burkina Faso =

Villa
- Location in Burkina Faso
- Coordinates: 12°17′N 1°50′W
- Country: Burkina Faso
- Region: Centre-Ouest Region
- Province: Boulkiemdé Province
- Department: Bingo Department

Population (2019)
  - Total: 1,805
- Time zone: UTC+0 (GMT 0)

Villa is a town in the Bingo Department of Boulkiemdé Province in central western Burkina Faso.

Population
Year	Pop.	±%
1985	1,596	—
2006	1,867	+17.0%
2019	1,805	−3.3%
