= Tiogo Mossi =

Coordinates: 12.3317°N 2.3885°W

- Interactive map of Tiogo Mossi
- Country: Burkina Faso
- Region: Centre-Ouest Region
- Province: Boulkiemdé Province
- Department: Koudougou Department

Population (2019)
  - Total: 3,098

Tiogo Mossi is a town in the Koudougou Department of Boulkiemdé Province in central Burkina Faso.

Population
Year	Pop.	±%
1985	1,588	—
2006	2,685	+69.1%
2019	3,098	+15.4%
