= Yagoam =

- Country: Burkina Faso
- Region: Centre-Ouest Region
- Province: Boulkiemdé Province
- Department: Ramongo Department

Population (2019)
  - Total: 1,088
- Time zone: UTC+0 (GMT 0)

Yagoam is a town in the Ramongo Department of Boulkiemdé Province in central western Burkina Faso.

Population
Year	Pop.	±%
1985	426	—
2006	1,070	+151.2%
2019	1,088	+1.7%
