= Ramonkodogo =

- Location in Burkina Faso
- Coordinates: 12°12′N 2°12′W
- Country: Burkina Faso
- Region: Centre-Ouest Region
- Province: Boulkiemdé Province
- Department: Ramongo Department

Population (2019)
  - Total: 2,686
- Time zone: UTC+0 (GMT 0)

Ramonkodogo is a town in the Ramongo Department of Boulkiemdé Province, in central western Burkina Faso.

Population
Year	Pop.	±%
1985	1,896	—
2006	1,834	−3.3%
2019	2,686	+46.5%
