= Semtenga =

- Country: Burkina Faso
- Region: Centre-Ouest Region
- Province: Boulkiemdé Province
- Department: Siglé Department

Population (2019)
  - Total: 1,000
- Time zone: UTC+0 (GMT 0)

Semtenga is a village in the Siglé Department of Boulkiemdé Province in central western Burkina Faso.

Population
Year	Pop.	±%
2006	766	—
2019	1,000	+30.5%
