= Danierma =

Danierma Dancerma
- Location in Burkina Faso
- Country: Burkina Faso
- Region: Centre-Ouest Region
- Province: Boulkiemdé Province
- Department: Imasgho Department

Population (2019)
  - Total: 2,058
- Time zone: UTC+0 (GMT 0)

Danierma is a town in the Imasgho Department of Boulkiemdé Province in central western Burkina Faso.

Population
Year	Pop.	±%
1985	1,738	—
2006	2,112	+21.5%
2019	2,058	−2.6%
