= Gourcy, Boulkiemdé =

Gourcy
- Country: Burkina Faso
- Region: Centre-Ouest Region
- Province: Boulkiemdé Province
- Department: Nandiala Department

Population (2019)
  - Total: 3,449
- Time zone: UTC+0 (GMT 0)

Gourcy is a town in the Nandiala Department of Boulkiemdé Province in central western Burkina Faso.

Population
| Year | Pop. | ±% |
|---|---|---|
| 2006 | 2,937 | — |
| 2019 | 3,449 | +17.4% |
