= Péyiri =

- Interactive map of Péyiri
- Country: Burkina Faso
- Region: Centre-Ouest Region
- Province: Boulkiemdé Province
- Department: Koudougou Department

Population (2019)
  - Total: 2,695

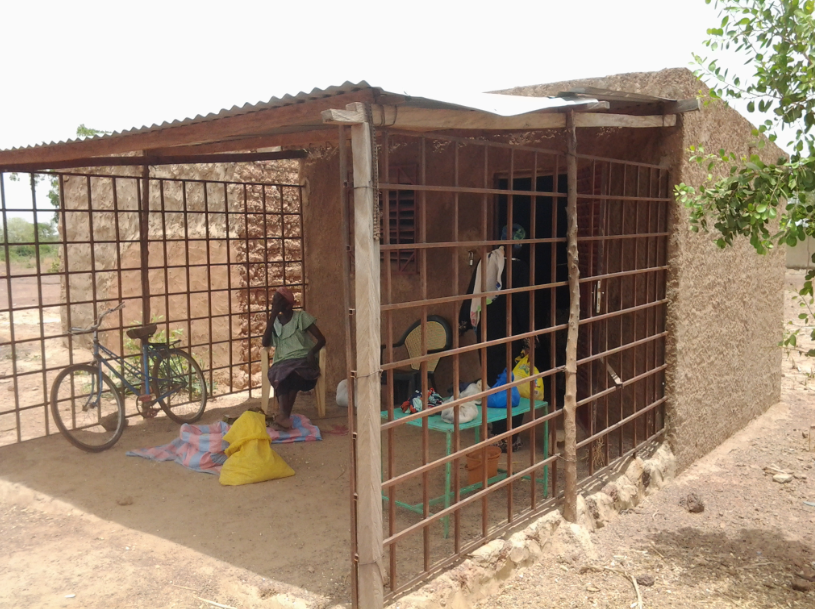
Péyiri Cereal Bank

Péyiri is a town in the Koudougou Department of Boulkiemdé Province in central Burkina Faso.

Population
Year	Pop.	±%
1985	1,551	—
2006	2,058	+32.7%
2019	2,695	+31.0%
