= Kikigogo =

- Location in Burkina Faso
- Coordinates: 12°23′N 2°22′W
- Country: Burkina Faso
- Region: Centre-Ouest Region
- Province: Boulkiemdé Province
- Department: Koudougou Department

Population (2019)
  - Total: 1,894

Kikigogo is a village in the Koudougou Department of Boulkiemdé Province in central Burkina Faso.

Population
Year	Pop.	±%
1985	1,067	—
2006	1,545	+44.8%
2019	1,894	+22.6%
