= Vella, Burkina Faso =

Vella Velia
- Location in Burkina Faso
- Coordinates: 12°0′N 2°7′W
- Country: Burkina Faso
- Region: Centre-Ouest Region
- Province: Boulkiemdé Province
- Department: Thyou Department

Population (2019)
  - Total: 1,722
- Time zone: UTC+0 (GMT 0)

Vella is a town in the Thyou Department of Boulkiemdé Province in central western Burkina Faso.

Population
Year	Pop.	±%
1985	1,728	—
2006	2,518	+45.7%
2019	1,722	−31.6%
