= Daboala =

Daboala Dabola
- Location in Burkina Faso
- Coordinates: 12°36′N 2°2′W
- Country: Burkina Faso
- Region: Centre-Ouest Region
- Province: Boulkiemdé Province
- Department: Pella Department

Population (2019)
  - Total: 1,634
- Time zone: UTC+0 (GMT 0)

Daboala is a town in the Pella Department of Boulkiemdé Province in central western Burkina Faso.

Population
Year	Pop.	±%
1985	1,112	—
2006	1,295	+16.5%
2019	1,634	+26.2%
