= Goumogo =

- Location in Burkina Faso
- Coordinates: 12°07′N 1°46′W
- Country: Burkina Faso
- Region: Centre-Ouest Region
- Province: Boulkiemdé Province
- Department: Thyou Department

Population (2019)
  - Total: 2,267
- Time zone: UTC+0 (GMT 0)

Goumogo is a town in the Thyou Department of Boulkiemdé Province in central western Burkina Faso.

Population
Year	Pop.	±%
1985	1,154	—
2006	1,570	+36.0%
2019	2,267	+44.4%
