= Tibrela =

- Country: Burkina Faso
- Region: Centre-Ouest Region
- Province: Boulkiemdé Province
- Department: Nandiala Department

Population (2019)
  - Total: 4,393
- Time zone: UTC+0 (GMT 0)

Tibrela is a town in the Nandiala Department of Boulkiemdé Province in central western Burkina Faso.

Population
Year	Pop.	±%
1985	1,844	—
2006	3,000	+62.7%
2019	4,393	+46.4%
