= Lâ =

- Location in Burkina Faso
- Coordinates: 12°4′N 2°19′W
- Country: Burkina Faso
- Region: Centre-Ouest Region
- Province: Boulkiemdé Province
- Department: Sourgou Department

Population (2019)
  - Total: 2,853
- Time zone: UTC+0 (GMT 0)

Lâ is a town in the Sourgou Department of Boulkiemdé Province in central western Burkina Faso.

Population
Year	Pop.	±%
1985	1,269	—
2006	2,279	+79.6%
2019	2,853	+25.2%
