= Sigoghin =

Sigoghin Sigoguin
- Country: Burkina Faso
- Region: Centre-Ouest Region
- Province: Boulkiemdé Province
- Department: Koudougou Department

Population (2019)
  - Total: 4,048

Sigoghin is a town in the Koudougou Department of Boulkiemdé Province in central Burkina Faso.

Population
Year	Pop.	±%
1985	1,522	—
2006	1,909	+25.4%
2019	4,048	+112.0%
