= Kokologo =

Kokologo Kokologho
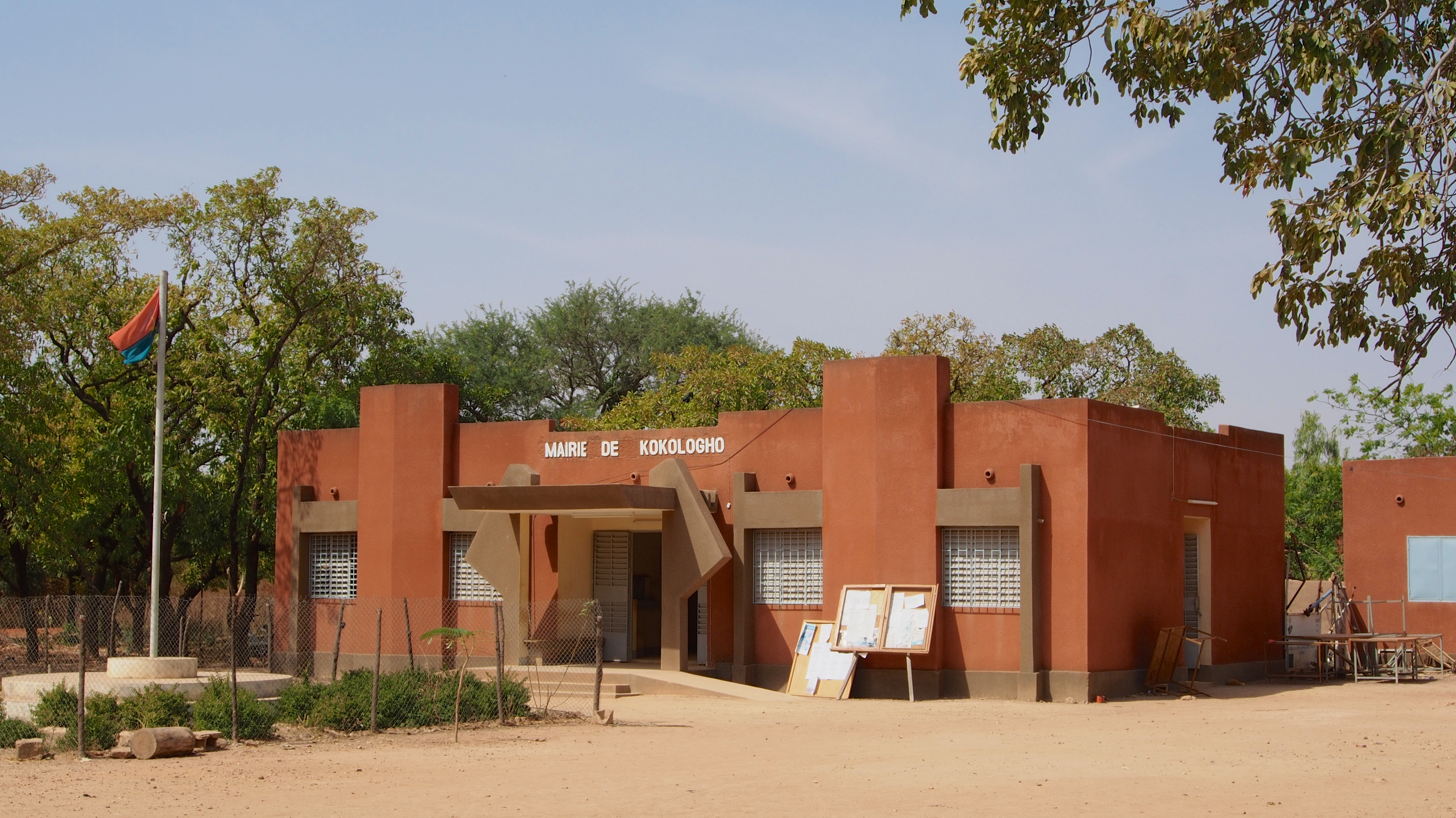

- Location in Burkina Faso
- Coordinates: 12°11′N 1°53′W
- Country: Burkina Faso
- Region: Centre-Ouest Region
- Province: Boulkiemdé Province
- Department: Kokologo Department

Population (2019)
  - Total: 10,467
- Time zone: UTC+0 (GMT 0)

Kokologo or Kokologho is the capital of the Kokologo Department of Boulkiemdé Province in central western Burkina Faso.

Population
Year	Pop.	±%
1985	7,490	—
2006	14,194	+89.5%
2019	10,467	−26.3%
