= Gouim =

- town
- Location in Burkina Faso
- Country: Burkina Faso
- Region: Centre-Ouest Region
- Province: Boulkiemdé Province
- Department: Nandiala Department

Population (2019)
  - Total: 2,820
- Time zone: UTC+0 (GMT 0)

Gouim is a town in the Nandiala Department of Boulkiemdé Province in central western Burkina Faso.

Population
Year	Pop.	±%
1985	1,401	—
2006	2,218	+58.3%
2019	2,820	+27.1%
