= Kindi, Kindi =

Kindi
- Location in Burkina Faso
- Coordinates: 12°26′N 2°1′W
- Country: Burkina Faso
- Region: Centre-Ouest Region
- Province: Boulkiemdé Province
- Department: Kindi Department
- Elevation: 330 m (1,080 ft)

Population (2019)
  - Total: 16,424
- Time zone: UTC+0 (GMT 0)

Kindi is the capital of the Kindi Department of Boulkiemdé Province in central western Burkina Faso.

Population
Year	Pop.	±%
1985	6,826	—
2006	11,308	+65.7%
2019	16,424	+45.2%
