= Goala =

Goala may refer to:

- Vedea, Teleorman, formerly Goala, a commune in Romania
- Goala, Burkina Faso, a town in the Sahara
- Golla (caste), herdsman community of south India
- Gowala (caste), herdsman community of east India
