= Temnaoré, Boulkiemdé =

Temnaoré
- Location in Burkina Faso
- Coordinates: 12°36′N 1°53′W
- Country: Burkina Faso
- Region: Centre-Ouest Region
- Province: Boulkiemdé Province
- Department: Siglé Department

Population (2019)
  - Total: 4,766
- Time zone: UTC+0 (GMT 0)

Temnaoré is a village in the Siglé Department of Boulkiemdé Province in central western Burkina Faso.

Population
Year	Pop.	±%
1985	2,159	—
2006	4,540	+110.3%
2019	4,766	+5.0%
