= Imasgho =

Imasgho Imasgo
- town
- Location in Burkina Faso
- Coordinates: 12.4393°N 2.3331°W
- Country: Burkina Faso
- Region: Centre-Ouest Region
- Province: Boulkiemdé Province
- Department: Imasgho Department

Population (2019)
  - Total: 10,193
- Time zone: UTC+0 (GMT 0)

Imasgho is the capital of the Imasgho Department of Boulkiemdé Province in central western Burkina Faso.

Population
Year	Pop.	±%
1985	8,265	—
2006	12,053	+45.8%
2019	10,193	−15.4%
