= Thyou =

Thyou Thiou
- Location in Burkina Faso
- Coordinates: 11°57′N 2°12′W
- Country: Burkina Faso
- Region: Centre-Ouest Region
- Province: Boulkiemdé Province
- Department: Thyou Department

Population (2019)
  - Total: 8,786
- Time zone: UTC+0 (GMT 0)

Thyou is the capital of the Thyou Department of Boulkiemdé Province in central western Burkina Faso.

Population
Year	Pop.	±%
1985	7,342	—
2006	5,955	−18.9%
2019	8,786	+47.5%
