= Goala, Burkina Faso =

Goala
- Location in Burkina Faso
- Coordinates: 12°33′N 2°5′W
- Country: Burkina Faso
- Region: Centre-Ouest Region
- Province: Boulkiemdé Province
- Department: Pella Department

Population (2019)
  - Total: 4,586
- Time zone: UTC+0 (GMT 0)

Goala is a town in the Pella Department of Boulkiemdé Province in central western Burkina Faso.

Goala is in the Sahara desert. It gets very hot.

Population
Year	Pop.	±%
1985	3,716	—
2006	3,663	−1.4%
2019	4,586	+25.2%
