= Temnaoré =

Temnaoré may refer to:

- Temnaoré, Bam, Burkina Faso
- Temnaoré, Boulkiemdé, Burkina Faso
