= Segedin =

Segedin or Šegedin may refer to:

- Sanjak of Segedin, an administrative territorial entity of the Ottoman Empire whose capital was Szeged
- Szeged, a city in Hungary whose name in the Serbian language is Segedin
- Leo Segedin (1927–2025), American artist and educator
- Petar Šegedin (disambiguation)
- Rob Segedin (born 1988), American MLB player

== See also ==
- Séguédin (disambiguation)
