= Sogpelcé, Poa =

Sogpelcé
- Location in Burkina Faso
- Coordinates: 12°10′N 2°10′W
- Country: Burkina Faso
- Region: Centre-Ouest Region
- Province: Boulkiemdé Province
- Department: Poa Department

Population (2019)
  - Total: 1,751
- Time zone: UTC+0 (GMT 0)

Sogpelcé is a town in the Poa Department of Boulkiemdé Province in central western Burkina Faso.

Population
Year	Pop.	±%
2006	1,597	—
2019	1,751	+9.6%
