= Ramongo =

- Location in Burkina Faso
- Country: Burkina Faso
- Region: Centre-Ouest Region
- Province: Boulkiemdé Province
- Department: Ramongo Department

Population (2005)
  - Total: 2,500
- Time zone: UTC+0 (GMT 0)

Ramongo is a town in the Ramongo Department of Boulkiemdé Province in central western Burkina Faso. It is the capital of the Ramongo Department and has a population of 2,500.
