= Basziri, Kokologho =

Basziri
- Location in Burkina Faso
- Coordinates: 12°11′N 1°51′W
- Country: Burkina Faso
- Region: Centre-Ouest Region
- Province: Boulkiemdé Province
- Department: Kokologho Department

Population (2019)
  - Total: 8,952
- Time zone: UTC+0 (GMT 0)

Basziri is a town in the Kokologho Department of Boulkiemdé Province in central western Burkina Faso.

Population
Year	Pop.	±%
1985	2,990	—
2006	1,961	−34.4%
2019	8,952	+356.5%
