= Boulsin, Boulkiemdé =

Boulsin
- Location in Burkina Faso
- Coordinates: 12°22′N 2°24′W
- Country: Burkina Faso
- Region: Centre-Ouest Region
- Province: Boulkiemdé Province
- Department: Koudougou Department

Population (2019)
  - Total: 2,105

Boulsin is a town in the Koudougou Department of Boulkiemdé Province in central Burkina Faso.

Population
Year	Pop.	±%
1985	2,898	—
2006	1,761	−39.2%
2019	2,105	+19.5%
