= Pella, Burkina Faso =

Pella
- Location in Burkina Faso
- Coordinates: 12°35′N 2°2′W
- Country: Burkina Faso
- Region: Centre-Ouest Region
- Province: Boulkiemdé Province
- Department: Pella Department

Population (2019)
  - Total: 7,922
- Time zone: UTC+0 (GMT 0)

Pella is a is the capital of the Pella Department of Boulkiemdé Province in central western Burkina Faso.

Population
Year	Pop.	±%
1985	5,214	—
2006	6,282	+20.5%
2019	7,922	+26.1%
