= Séguédin, Soaw =

Séguédin
- Location in Burkina Faso
- Country: Burkina Faso
- Region: Centre-Ouest Region
- Province: Boulkiemdé Province
- Department: Soaw Department

Population (2019)
  - Total: 3,128
- Time zone: UTC+0 (GMT 0)

Séguédin is a town in the Soaw Department of Boulkiemdé Province in central western Burkina Faso.

Population
Year	Pop.	±%
2006	2,617	—
2019	3,128	+19.5%
