= Zoétgomdé, Boulkiemdé =

Zoétgomdé
- Location in Burkina Faso
- Country: Burkina Faso
- Region: Centre-Ouest Region
- Province: Boulkiemdé Province
- Department: Soaw Department

Population (2019)
  - Total: 1,032
- Time zone: UTC+0 (GMT 0)

Zoétgomdé is a village in the Soaw Department of Boulkiemdé Province in central western Burkina Faso.

Population
| Year | Pop. | ±% |
|---|---|---|
| 1985 | 909 | — |
| 2006 | 767 | −15.6% |
| 2019 | 1,032 | +34.6% |
