= Moukouan =

- Country: Burkina Faso
- Region: Centre-Ouest Region
- Province: Boulkiemdé Province
- Department: Thyou Department

Population (2019)
  - Total: 1,300
- Time zone: UTC+0 (GMT 0)

Moukouan is a town in the Thyou Department of Boulkiemdé Province in central western Burkina Faso.

Population
| Year | Pop. | ±% |
|---|---|---|
| 2006 | 1,109 | — |
| 2019 | 1,300 | +17.2% |
