= Sourgou =

- Location in Burkina Faso
- Coordinates: 12°8′N 2°17′W
- Country: Burkina Faso
- Region: Centre-Ouest Region
- Province: Boulkiemdé Province
- Department: Sourgou Department

Population (2019)
  - Total: 3,080
- Time zone: UTC+0 (GMT 0)

Sourgou is the capital of the Sourgou Department of Boulkiemdé Province in central western Burkina Faso.

Population
Year	Pop.	±%
1985	3,931	—
2006	2,983	−24.1%
2019	3,080	+3.3%
