= Siglé =

- Location in Burkina Faso
- Coordinates: 12°33′22″N 1°53′16″W
- Country: Burkina Faso
- Region: Centre-Ouest Region
- Province: Boulkiemdé Province
- Department: Siglé Department

Population (2019)
  - Total: 2,684
- Time zone: UTC+0 (GMT 0)

Siglé is the capital of the Siglé Department of Boulkiemdé Province in central western Burkina Faso.

Population
Year	Pop.	±%
1985	2,227	—
2006	2,253	+1.2%
2019	2,684	+19.1%
