= Zerkoum =

- Location in Burkina Faso
- Coordinates: 12°23′N 2°4′W
- Country: Burkina Faso
- Region: Centre-Ouest Region
- Province: Boulkiemdé Province
- Department: Kindi Department

Population (2019)
  - Total: 3,915
- Time zone: UTC+0 (GMT 0)

Zerkoum is a town in the Kindi Department of Boulkiemdé Province in central western Burkina Faso.

Population
Year	Pop.	±%
1985	2,019	—
2006	3,104	+53.7%
2019	3,915	+26.1%
