= Sam, Boulkiemdé =

Sam
- Location in Burkina Faso
- Coordinates: 12°5′N 2°0′W
- Country: Burkina Faso
- Region: Centre-Ouest Region
- Province: Boulkiemdé Province
- Department: Kokologho Department

Population (2019)
  - Total: 1,255
- Time zone: UTC+0 (GMT 0)

Sam is a town in the Kokologho Department of Boulkiemdé Province in central western Burkina Faso.

Population
Year	Pop.	±%
1985	654	—
2006	1,007	+54.0%
2019	1,255	+24.6%
