= Sam, Burkina Faso =

Sam, Burkina Faso may refer to:

- Sam, Boulkiemdé
- Sam, Bourzanga
- Sam, Kongoussi
