= Mboukou =

Mboukou may refer to:

- Jean-Pierre Makouta-Mboukou (1929–2012), Congolese politician
- Marie-Christine Mboukou (born 1942), Central African Republic politician
- Lake Mboukou, lake in the Congo

== See also ==
- Moukouan
- Mboumoua
