= Goulouré =

Goulouré may refer to:

- Goulouré, Kokologho
- Goulouré, Nanoro
