= Poa, Boulkiemdé =

Poa
- Location in Burkina Faso
- Coordinates: 12°13′N 2°6′W
- Country: Burkina Faso
- Region: Centre-Ouest Region
- Province: Boulkiemdé Province
- Department: Poa Department

Population (2019)
  - Total: 7,376
- Time zone: UTC+0 (GMT 0)

Poa is the capital of the Poa Department of Boulkiemdé Province in central western Burkina Faso.

Population
Year	Pop.	±%
1985	5,207	—
2006	7,103	+36.4%
2019	7,376	+3.8%
