= Guirgo, Boulkiemdé =

Guirgo
- Location in Burkina Faso
- Coordinates: 12°6′N 2°19′W
- Country: Burkina Faso
- Region: Centre-Ouest Region
- Province: Boulkiemdé Province
- Department: Sourgou Department

Population (2019)
  - Total: 1,656
- Time zone: UTC+0 (GMT 0)

Guirgo is a town in the Sourgou Department of Boulkiemdé Province in central western Burkina Faso.

Population
Year	Pop.	±%
1985	1,028	—
2006	797	−22.5%
2019	1,656	+107.8%
