= Basziri =

Basziri may refer to:

- Basziri, Kokologho
- Basziri, Nanoro
