= Séguédin, Siglé =

Séguédin
- Location in Burkina Faso
- Coordinates: 12°29′N 1°51′W
- Country: Burkina Faso
- Region: Centre-Ouest Region
- Province: Boulkiemdé Province
- Department: Siglé Department

Population (2019)
  - Total: 1,441
- Time zone: UTC+0 (GMT 0)

Séguédin is a town in the Siglé Department of Boulkiemdé Province in central western Burkina Faso.

Population
Year	Pop.	±%
1985	886	—
2006	1,176	+32.7%
2019	1,441	+22.5%
