= Sogpelcé, Thyou =

Sogpelcé Sogpelse
- Country: Burkina Faso
- Region: Centre-Ouest Region
- Province: Boulkiemdé Province
- Department: Thyou Department

Population (2019)
  - Total: 4,447
- Time zone: UTC+0 (GMT 0)

Sogpelcé is a town in the Thyou Department of Boulkiemdé Province in central western Burkina Faso.

Population
Year	Pop.	±%
1985	1,930	—
2006	3,806	+97.2%
2019	4,447	+16.8%
