= Zoétgomdé =

Zoétgomdé may refer to:

- Zoétgomdé, Boulkiemdé, Burkina Faso
- Zoétgomdé, Ganzourgou, Burkina Faso
