= Nandiala =

- Location in Burkina Faso
- Coordinates: 12°20′N 2°10′W
- Country: Burkina Faso
- Region: Centre-Ouest Region
- Province: Boulkiemdé Province
- Department: Nandiala Department

Population (2019)
  - Total: 2,258
- Time zone: UTC+0 (GMT 0)

Nandiala is the capital of the Nandiala Department of Boulkiemdé Province in central western Burkina Faso.

Population
Year	Pop.	±%
2006	1,664	—
2019	2,258	+35.7%
