= Goulouré, Kokologho =

Goulouré
- Location in Burkina Faso
- Coordinates: 12°13′N 1°55′W
- Country: Burkina Faso
- Region: Centre-Ouest Region
- Province: Boulkiemdé Province
- Department: Kokologho Department

Population (2019)
  - Total: 5,874
- Time zone: UTC+0 (GMT 0)

Goulouré is a town in the Kokologho Department of Boulkiemdé Province in central western Burkina Faso.

Population
Year	Pop.	±%
1985	4,500	—
2006	4,801	+6.7%
2019	5,874	+22.3%
