= Nayalgué, Boulkiemdé =

Nayalgué
- Location in Burkina Faso
- Coordinates: 12°19′N 2°19′W
- Country: Burkina Faso
- Region: Centre-Ouest Region
- Province: Boulkiemdé Province
- Department: Koudougou Department

Population (2019)
  - Total: 2,972

Nayalgué (or Nayalgay) is a town in the Koudougou Department of Boulkiemdé Province in central Burkina Faso.

Population
| Year | Pop. | ±% |
|---|---|---|
| 1985 | 3,144 | — |
| 2006 | 3,523 | +12.1% |
| 2019 | 2,972 | −15.6% |
