= Thyou Department =

Coordinates: 11°57′N 2°12′W

Thyrou
- Department
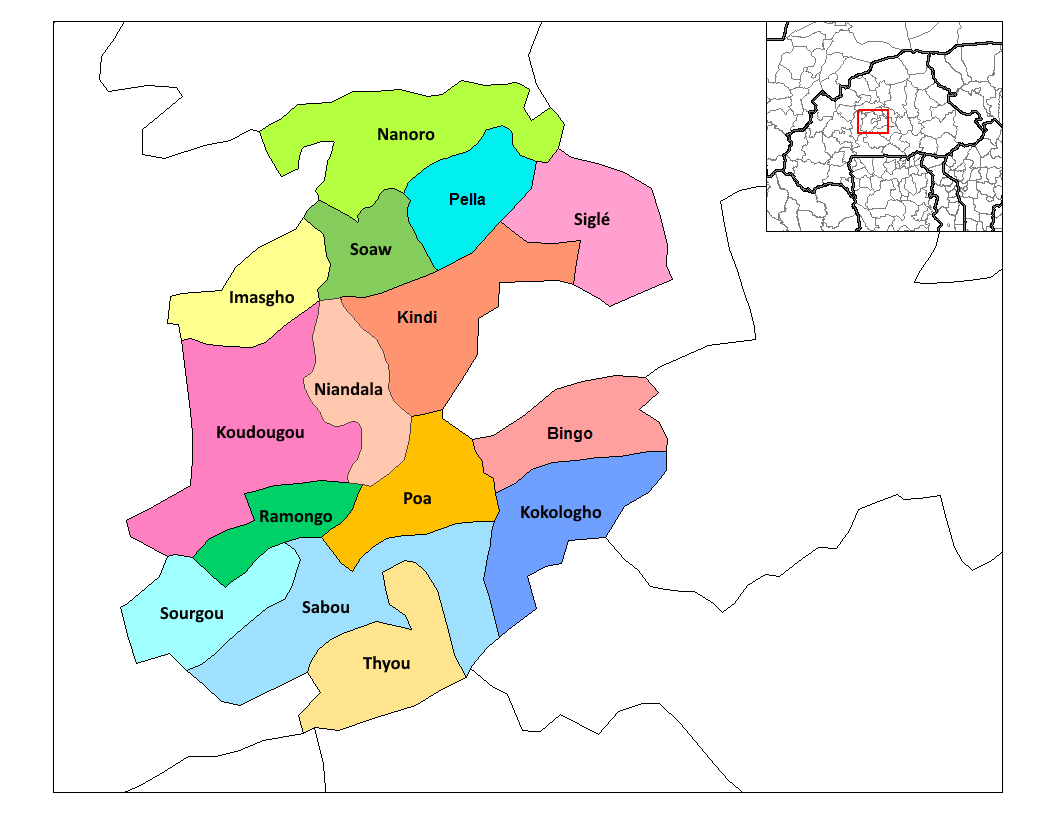
- Thyou Department location in the province
- Country: Burkina Faso
- Province: Boulkiemdé Province

Population (2005)
  - Total: 24,487
- Time zone: UTC+0 (GMT 0)

Thyrou is a department or commune of Boulkiemdé Province in central Burkina Faso. As of 2005 it has a population of 24,487. Its capital lies at the town of Thyrou.

== Towns and villages ==
· Thyou · Boutoko · Goumogo · Kamsé · Moukouan · Sogpelcé · Soula · Tatyou · Vella · Bangré
