= Siglé Department =

Coordinates: 12°33′26″N 1°53′13″W

Siglé
- Department
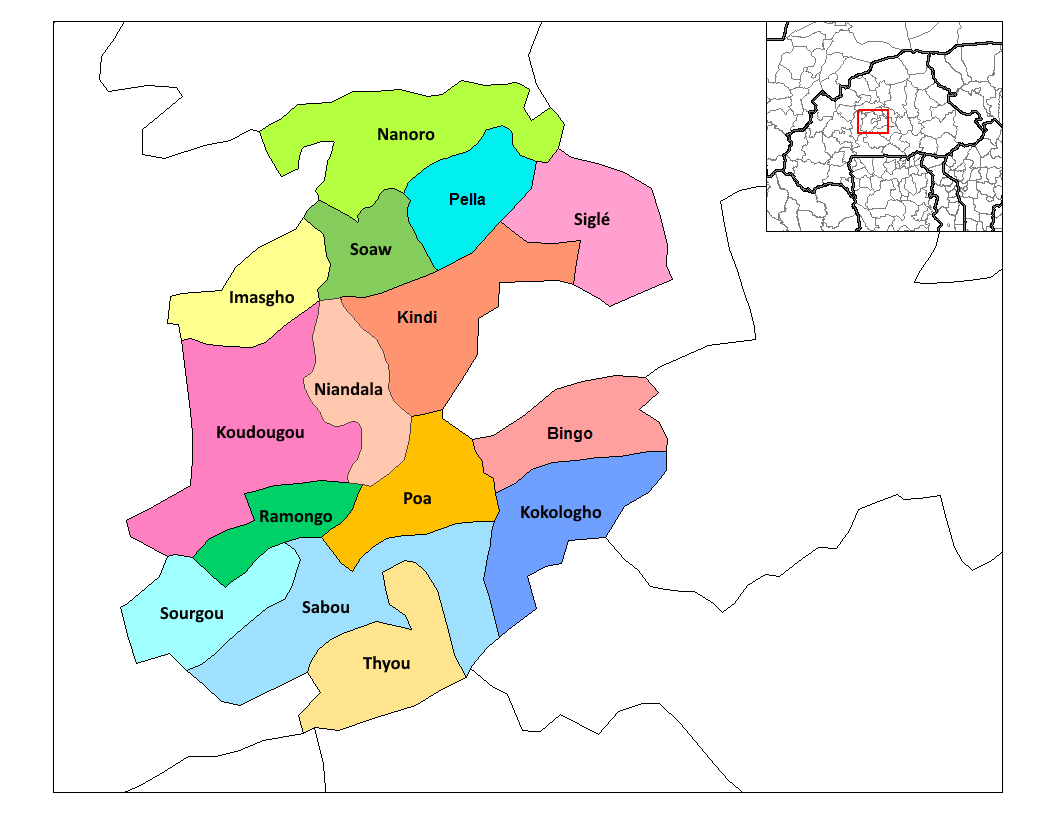
- Siglé Department location in the province
- Country: Burkina Faso
- Province: Boulkiemdé Province

Population (2005)
  - Total: 31,279
- Time zone: UTC+0 (GMT 0)

Siglé is a department or commune of Boulkiemdé Province in central Burkina Faso. As of 2005 it has a population of 31,279. Its capital lies at the town of Siglé.

== Towns and villages ==
· Siglé · Balogho · Bologo · Boukou · Dacissé · Daurnogomdé · Kouria · Lallé · Makoula · Nafougo · Palagré · Palilgogo · Séguédin · Semtenga · Temnaoré · Tia · Tio · Yargo
