= Sourgou Department =

Coordinates: 12°08′N 2°17′W

Sourgou
- Department
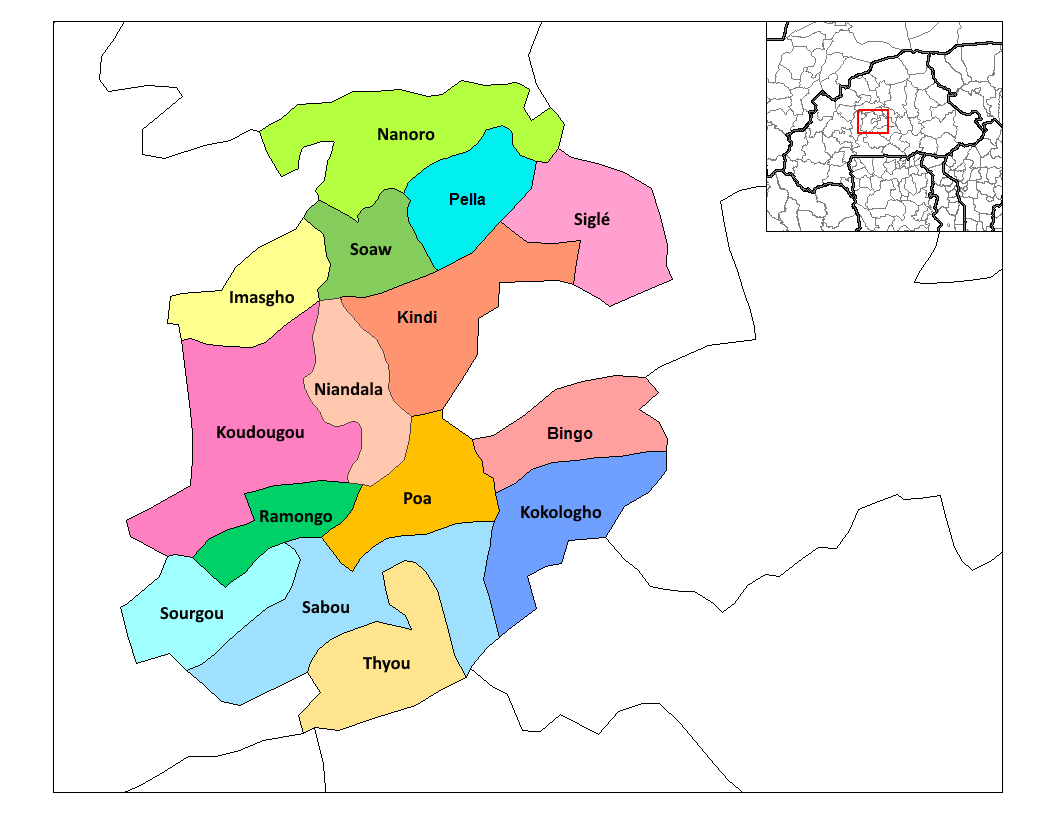
- Sourgou Department location in the province
- Country: Burkina Faso
- Province: Boulkiemdé Province

Population (2005)
  - Total: 13,878
- Time zone: UTC+0 (GMT 0)

Sourgou is a department or commune of Boulkiemdé Province in central Burkina Faso. As of 2005 it has a population of 13,878. Its capital lies at the town of Sourgou.

== Towns and villages ==
· Sourgou · Guirgo · Kougsin · Lâ · Ouoro · Rogho
