= Nandiala Department =

Coordinates: 12.3856°N 2.1605°W

Nandiala
- Department
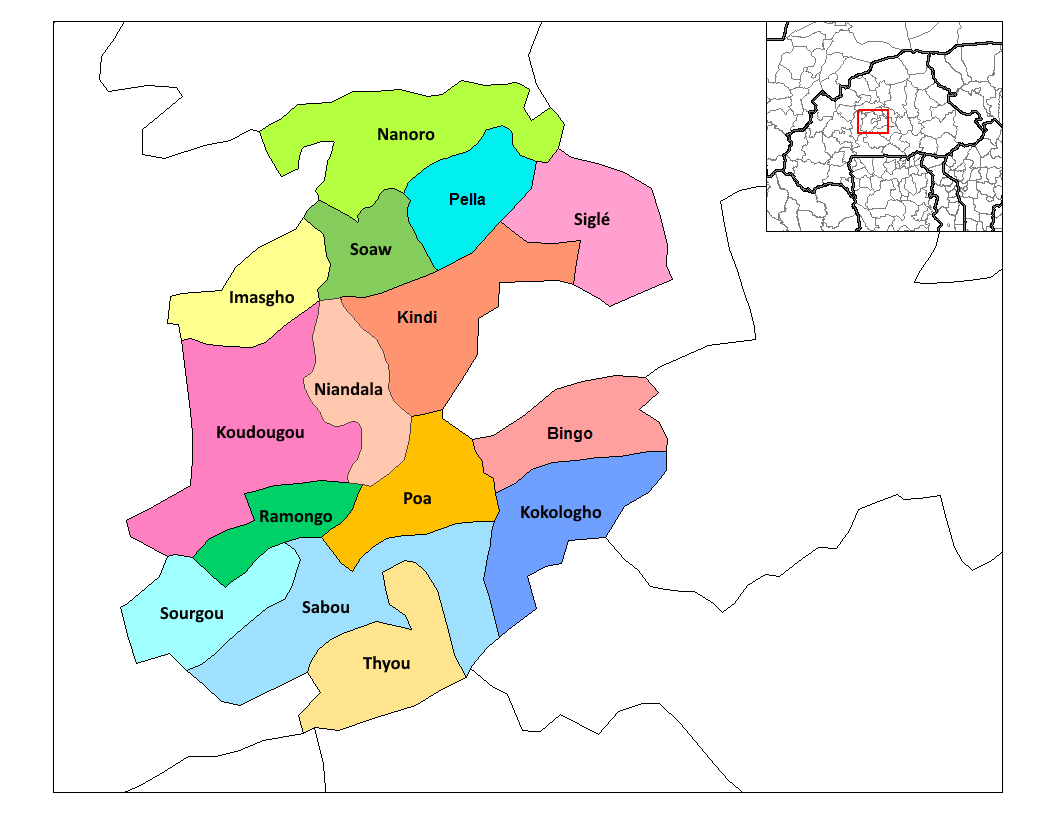
- Nandiala Department location in the province
- Country: Burkina Faso
- Province: Boulkiemdé Province

Population (2019)
  - Total: 31,314
- Time zone: UTC+0 (GMT 0)

Nandiala is a department or commune of Boulkiemdé Province in central Burkina Faso. As of 2005 it has a population of 33,530. Its capital lies at the town of Nandiala.

== Towns and villages ==
· Nandiala · Baoguin · Gouim · Gourongo · Gourcy · Itaoré · Kaoncé · Rihalo · Silmissin · Somé · Tibrela
