= Kokologo Department =

Coordinates: 12.2°N 1.86667°W

Kokologo Kokologho
- Department
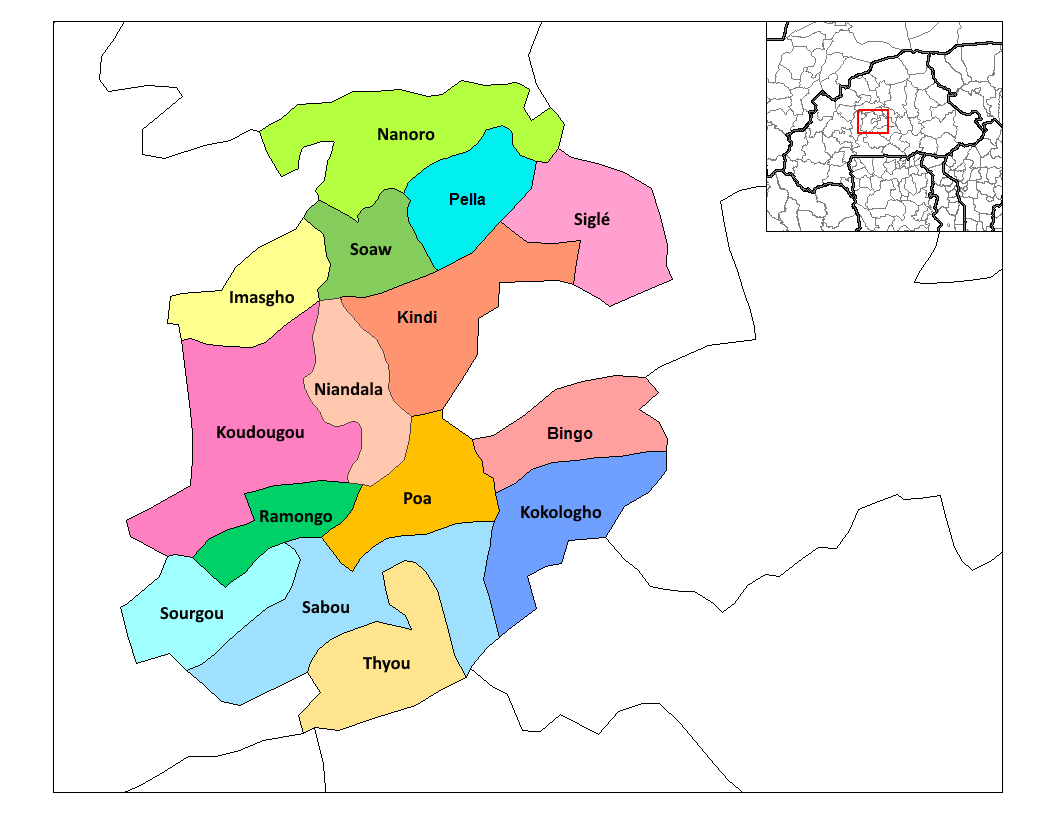
- Kokologho Department location in the province
- Country: Burkina Faso
- Province: Boulkiemdé Province

Area
  - Total: 115.3 sq mi (298.6 km^{2})

Population (2019)
  - Total: 51,670
  - Density: 448.2/sq mi (173.0/km^{2})
- Time zone: UTC+0 (GMT 0)

Kokologo or Kokologho is a department or commune of Boulkiemdé Province in central Burkina Faso. As of 2005, it had a population of 40,621. Its capital lies at the town of Kokologho.

== Towns and villages ==
· Kokologho · Basziri · Douré · Goulouré · Koulnatenga · Manega · Nidaga · Pitmoaga · Sakoinsé · Sam
