= Bingo, Boulkiemdé =

Bingo
- Location in Burkina Faso
- Coordinates: 12°18′N 1°49′W
- Country: Burkina Faso
- Region: Centre-Ouest Region
- Province: Boulkiemdé Province
- Department: Bingo Department

Population (2019)
  - Total: 2,465
- Time zone: UTC+0 (GMT 0)

Bingo is the capital of the Bingo Department of Boulkiemdé Province in central western Burkina Faso.

Population
Year	Pop.	±%
1985	1,766	—
2006	2,043	+15.7%
2019	2,465	+20.7%

== Namesakes ==
There are several other places in Burkina Faso with this name, such as one southwest of Kaya.
