= Soaw, Burkina Faso =

Soaw Soau
- Location in Burkina Faso
- Country: Burkina Faso
- Region: Centre-Ouest Region
- Province: Boulkiemdé Province
- Department: Soaw Department

Population (2019)
  - Total: 8,596
- Time zone: UTC+0 (GMT 0)

Soaw is the capital of the Soaw Department of Boulkiemdé Province in central western Burkina Faso.

Population
| Year | Pop. | ±% |
|---|---|---|
| 1985 | 4,258 | — |
| 2006 | 5,895 | +38.4% |
| 2019 | 8,596 | +45.8% |
