= Kindi Department =

Coordinates: 12°26′N 2°2′W

Kindi
- Department
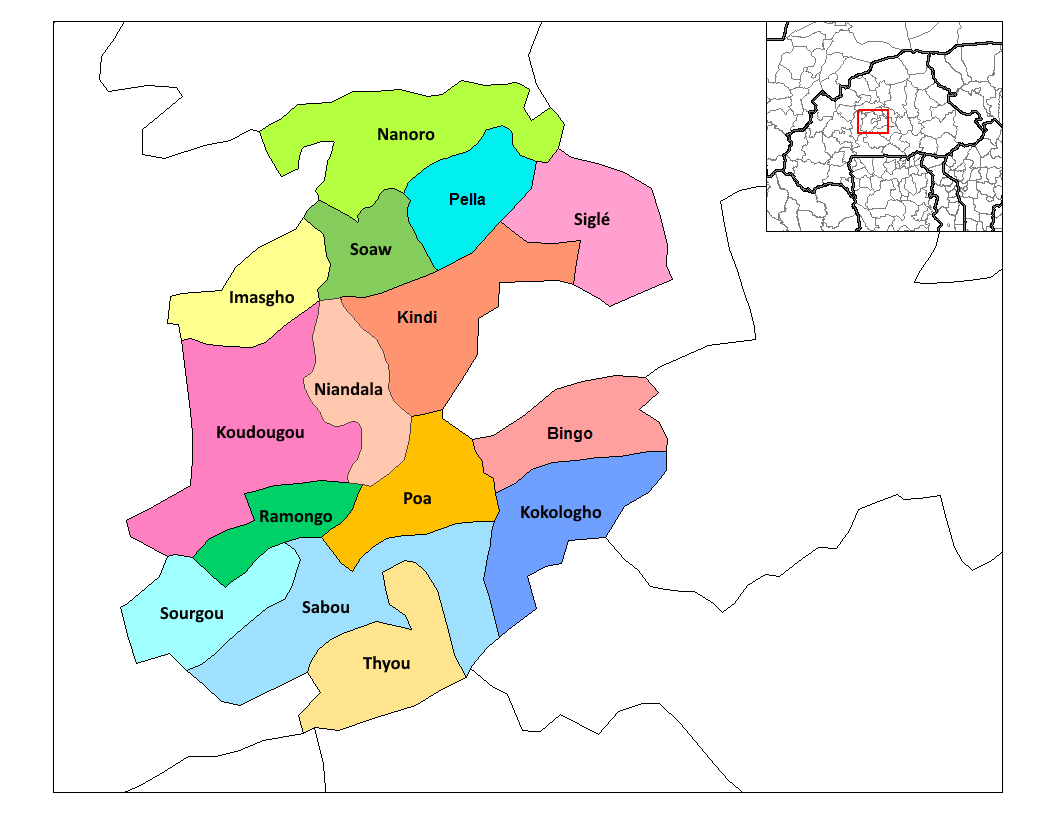
- Kindi Department location in the province
- Country: Burkina Faso
- Province: Boulkiemdé Province

Area
  - Total: 102.0 sq mi (264.3 km^{2})

Population (2019 census)
  - Total: 41,881
  - Density: 410.4/sq mi (158.5/km^{2})
- Time zone: UTC+0 (GMT 0)

Kindi is a department or commune of Boulkiemdé Province in central Burkina Faso. As of 2019 it had a population of 41,881. Its capital lies at the town of Kindi.

== Towns and villages ==
· Kindi · Koné · Manéviré · Masséré · Nassoulou · Zerkoum
