= Koudougou Department =

Coordinates: 12.25°N 2.36667°W

Koudougou
- Department
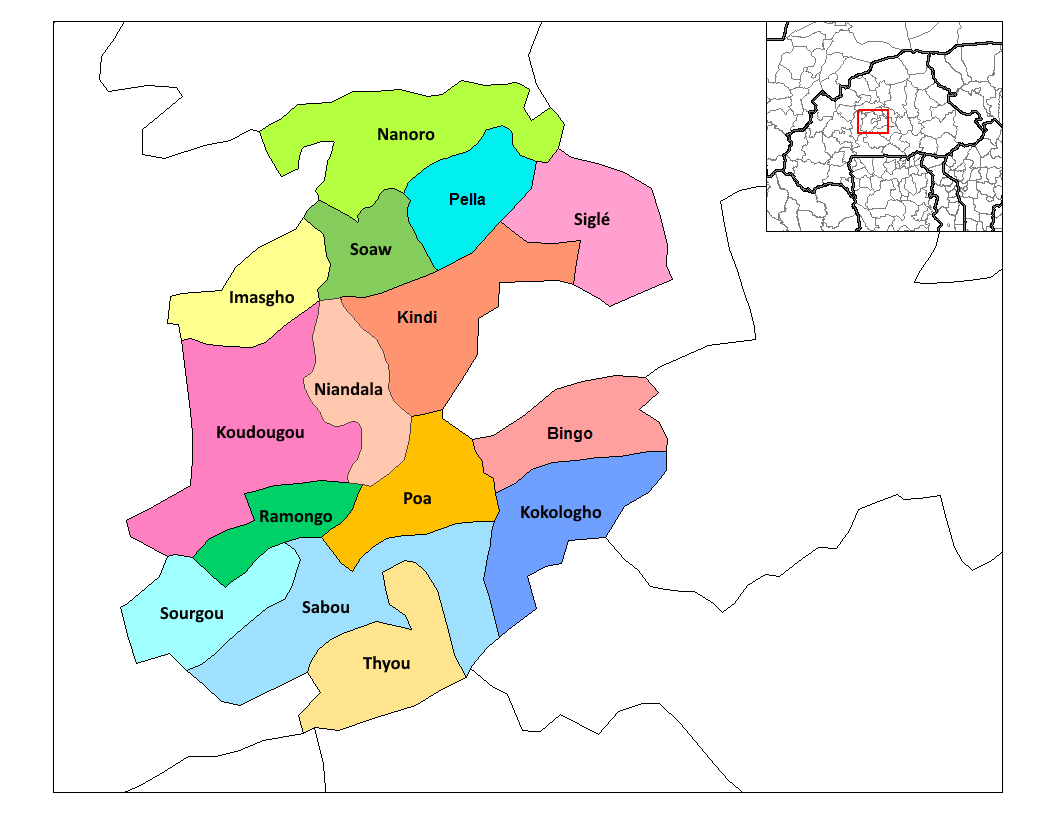
- Koudougou Department location in the province
- Country: Burkina Faso
- Province: Boulkiemdé Province

Area
  - Department: 225 sq mi (584 km^{2})

Population (2019 census)
  - Department: 216,774
  - Density: 961/sq mi (371/km^{2})
  - Urban: 160,239
- Time zone: UTC+0 (GMT 0)

Koudougou is a department or commune of Boulkiemdé Province in central Burkina Faso. As of 2019 it has a population of 216,774. Its capital is the town of Koudougou.

== Towns and villages ==
· Koudougou · Boulsin · Doulou · Gninga · Godin-Oualogtinga · Kamedji · Kikigogo · Kolgrogogo · Lattou · Nayalgué · Péyiri · Saria · Sigoghin · Toêga · Tiogo Mossi · Villy
