= Pella Department =

Coordinates: 12°35′N 2°2′W

Pella
- Department
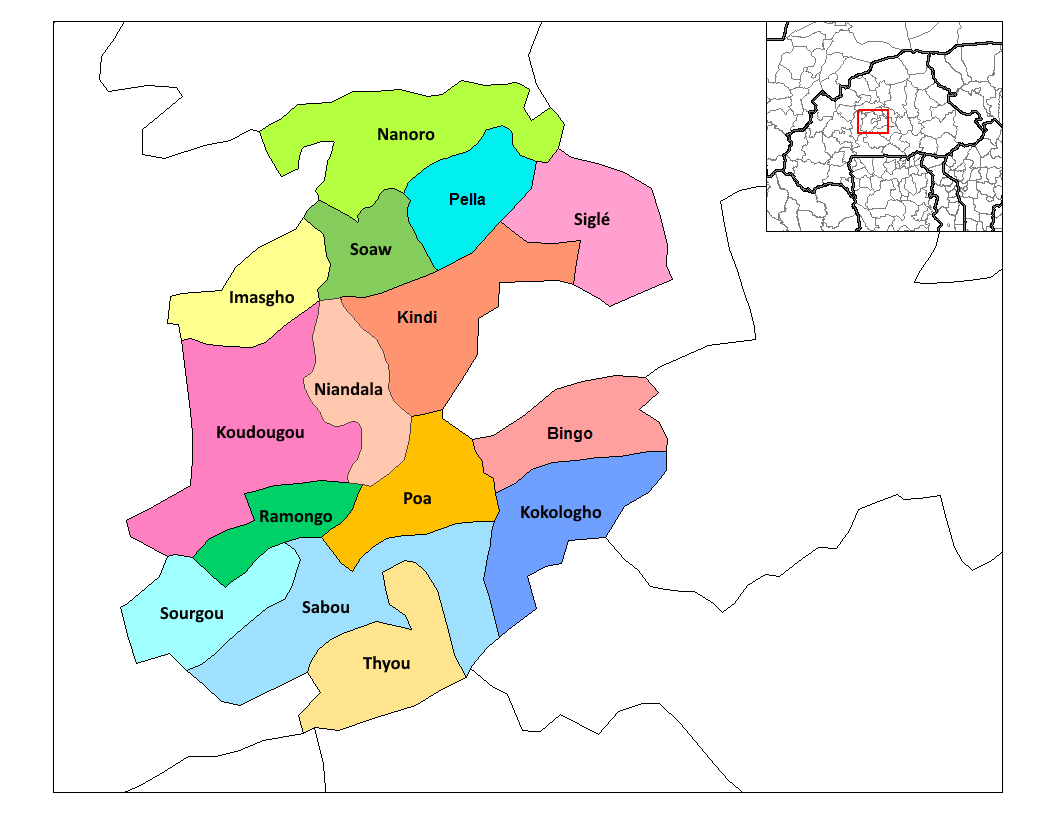
- Pella Department location in the province
- Country: Burkina Faso
- Province: Boulkiemdé Province

Area
  - Total: 78.4 sq mi (203.0 km^{2})

Population (2019 census)
  - Total: 24,606
  - Density: 313.9/sq mi (121.2/km^{2})
- Time zone: UTC+0 (GMT 0)

Pella is a department or commune of Boulkiemdé Province in central Burkina Faso. As of 2005 it has a population of 19,563. Its capital lies at the town of Pella.

== Towns and villages ==
· Pella · Babouli · Daboala · Goala · Godo · Kandaga · Kirguilounga · Nabziniguima · Pelbilin · Sarana · Somassi
