= Ramongo Department =

Coordinates: 12°13′N 2°14′W

Ramongo
- Department
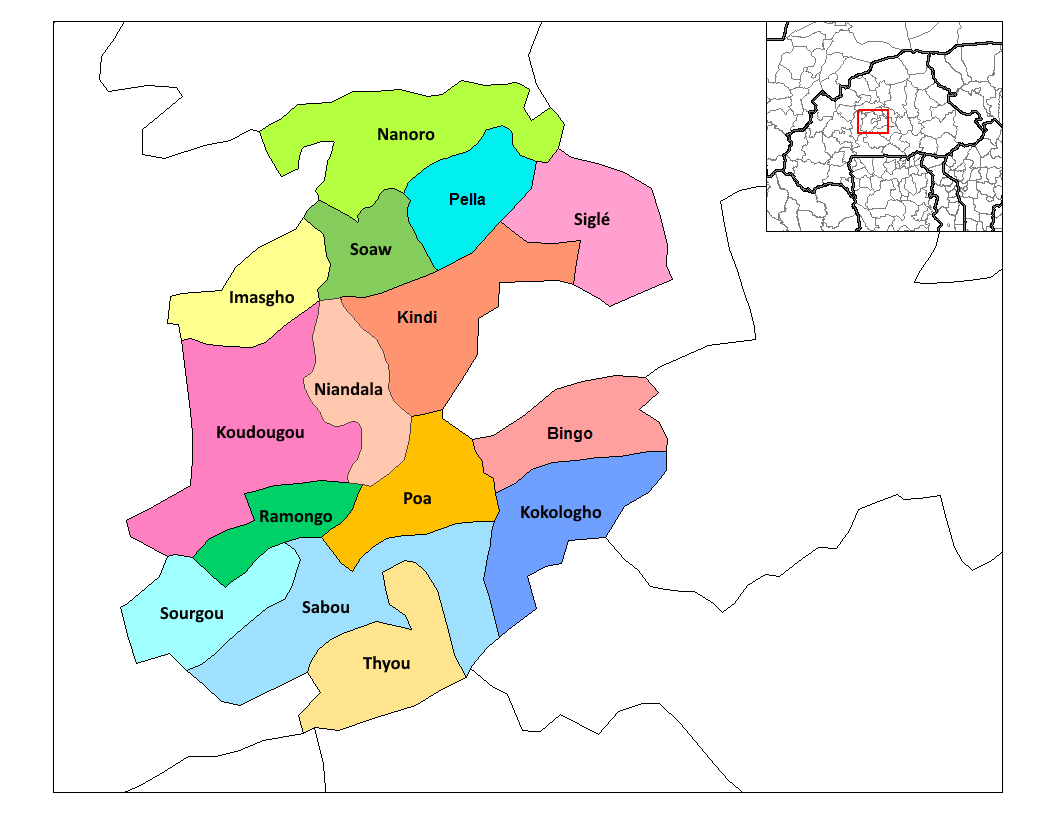
- Ramongo Department location in the province
- Country: Burkina Faso
- Province: Boulkiemdé Province

Population (2005)
  - Total: 28,326
- Time zone: UTC+0 (GMT 0)

Ramongo is a department or commune of Boulkiemdé Province in central Burkina Faso. As of 2005 it has a population of 28,326. Its capital lies at the town of Ramongo.

== Towns and villages ==
Ramongo · Bayandi Nabyiri · Bayandi Palogo · Bayandi Tanguin · Bouloum Nabyiri · Kabinou · Kamsi · Kolonkandé · Koukinkuilga · Ramongo-Tanguin · Ramonkodogo · Salbisgo-Dapoya · Salgisgo-Itaoré · Yagoam
