= Imasgho Department =

Coordinates: 12°26′N 2°20′W

Imasgho
- Department
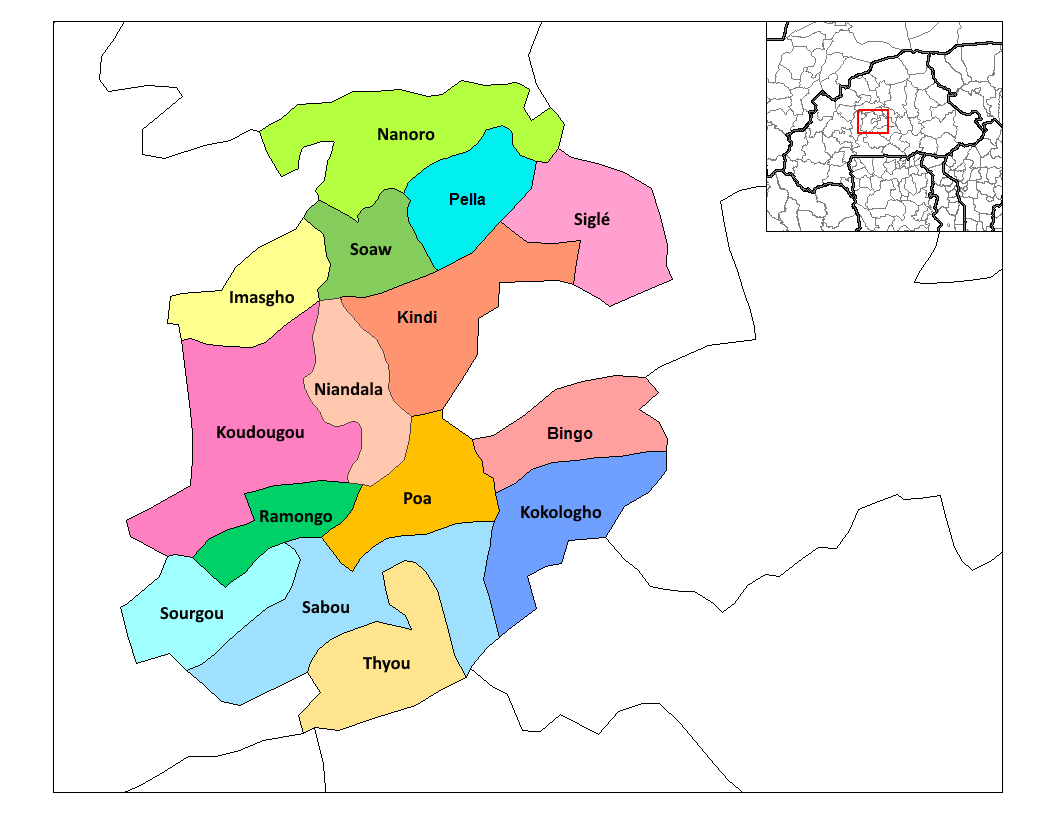
- Imasgho Department location in the province
- Country: Burkina Faso
- Province: Boulkiemdé Province

Area
  - Total: 83.2 sq mi (215.4 km^{2})

Population (2019 census)
  - Total: 27,762
  - Density: 333.8/sq mi (128.9/km^{2})
- Time zone: UTC+0 (GMT 0)

Imasgho is a department or commune of Boulkiemdé Province in central Burkina Faso. As of 2005, it had a population of 24,106. Its capital lies at the town of Imasgho.

== Towns and villages ==
· Imasgho · Danierma · Kanyalé · Lounga · Ouéra · Rana
