= Poa Department =

Coordinates: 11°27′N 3°0′W

Poa
- Department
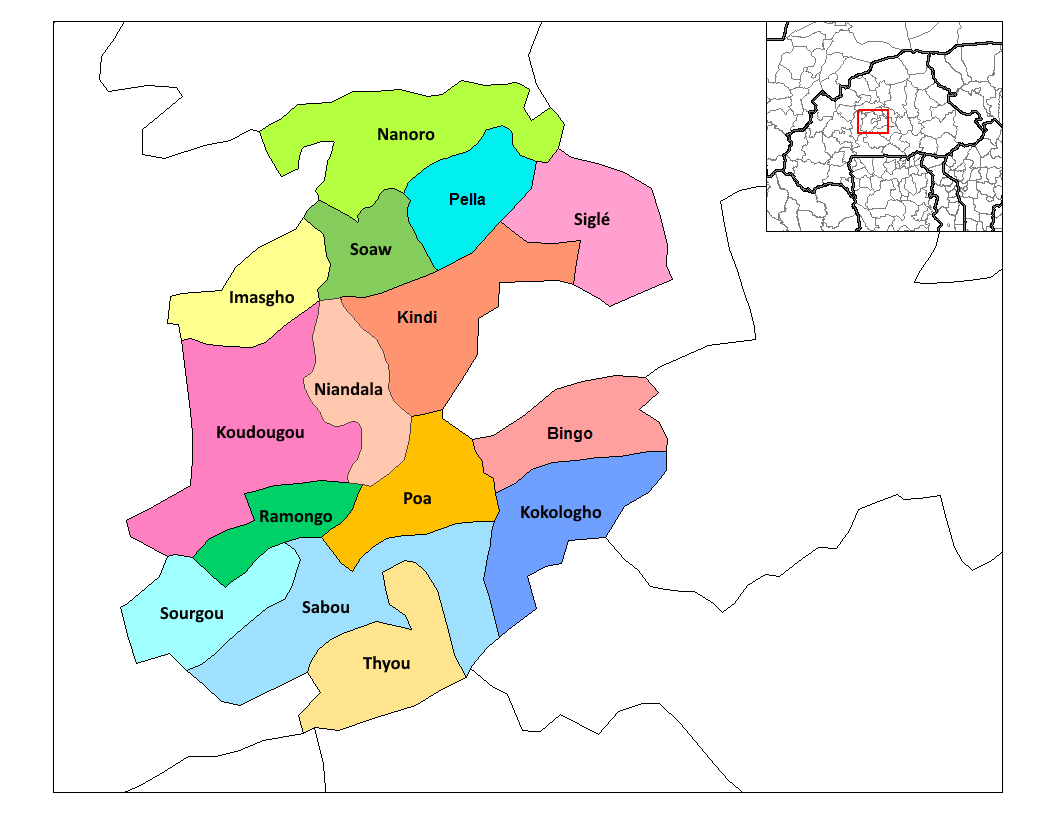
- Poa Department location in the province
- Country: Burkina Faso
- Province: Boulkiemdé Province

Population (2005)
  - Total: 30,406
- Time zone: UTC+0 (GMT 0)

Poa is a department or commune of Boulkiemdé Province in central Burkina Faso. As of 2005 it had a population of 30,406. Its capital lies at the town of Poa.

== Towns and villages ==
· Poa · Gogo · Loaga · Moungounissi · Niangdo · Noéssin · Ralo · Sogpelcé · Yaoguin · Yargo-Yarcés
