= Bingo Department =

Bingo
- Department
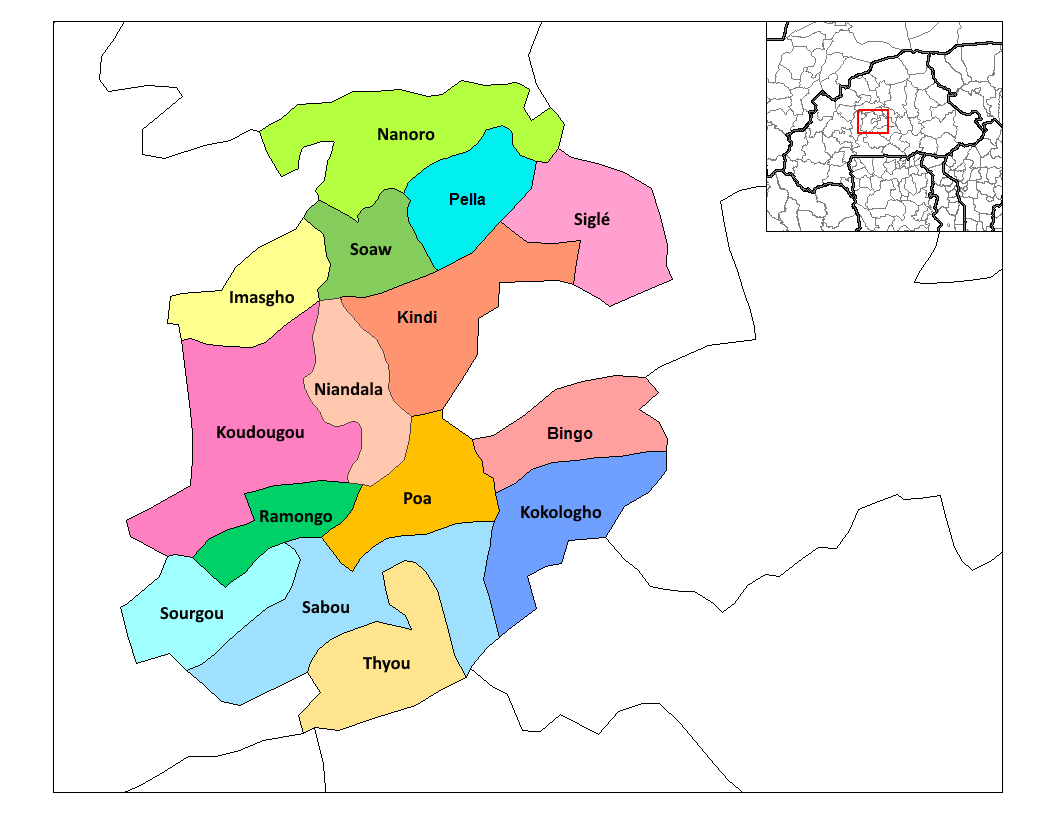
- Bingo Department location in the province
- Coordinates: 13°10′N 2°14′W
- Country: Burkina Faso
- Province: Boulkiemdé Province

Area
  - Total: 96.7 sq mi (250.4 km^{2})

Population (2019)
  - Total: 17,154
  - Density: 177.4/sq mi (68.51/km^{2})
- Time zone: UTC+0 (GMT 0)

Bingo is a department in the province of Boulkiemdé, west of Ouagadougou, the capital of Burkina Faso. As of 2005, it had a population of 16,541. Bingo is the capital of the department.

Bingo was a location in the American english television series The Amazing Race 12 (2007).

== Towns and villages ==
· Bingo · Bisraaga · Guillé · Kaligri · Koanga · Koulgorin · Sâ · Sapelo · Silgo · Tanghin · Villa · Zékemzougou
