= Nayalgué, Bazèga =

Village in Bazèga Province, Burkina Faso

Nayalgué
- Interactive map of Nayalgué
- Coordinates: 11°45′N 1°19′W
- Country: Burkina Faso
- Region: Centre-Sud Region
- Province: Bazèga Province
- Department: Toece Department

Population (2019)
  - Total: 281

Nayalgué is a village in the Toece Department of Bazèga Province in central Burkina Faso.

Population
Year	Pop.	±%
1985	235	—
2006	312	+32.8%
2019	281	−9.9%
