= Boulsin, Bazèga =

Boulsin
- Location within Burkina Faso
- Country: Burkina Faso
- Region: Centre-Sud Region
- Province: Bazèga Province
- Department: Saponé Department

Population (2019)
  - Total: 482

Boulsin is a village in the Saponé Department of Bazèga Province in central Burkina Faso.

Population
Year	Pop.	±%
2006	1,217	—
2019	482	−60.4%
