= Guirgo, Bazèga =

Guirgo
- Location in Burkina Faso
- Coordinates: 11°54′10″N 1°21′34″W
- Country: Burkina Faso
- Region: Centre-Sud Region
- Province: Bazèga Province
- Department: Kombissiri Department

Population (2019)
  - Total: 1,294

Guirgo is a town in the Kombissiri Department of Bazèga Province in central Burkina Faso.

Population
Year	Pop.	±%
1985	1,390	—
2006	1,909	+37.3%
2019	1,294	−32.2%
