= Soaw Department =

Coordinates: 12.5560°N 2.1860°W

Soaw
- Department
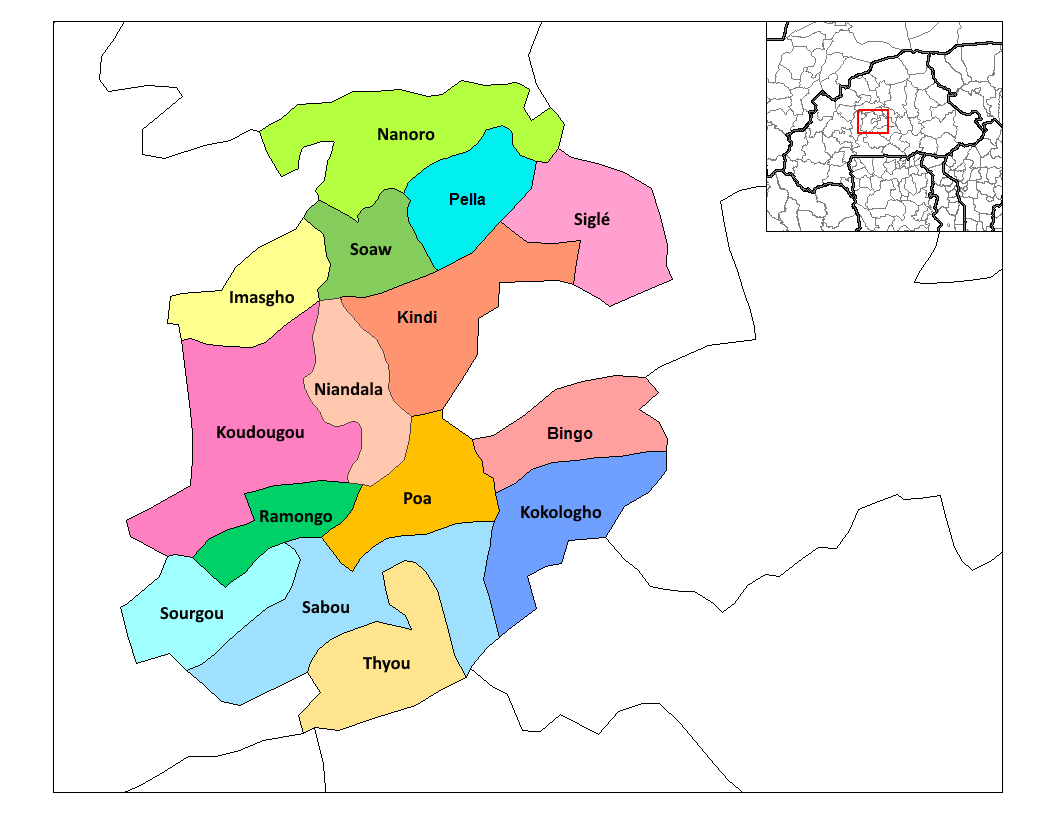
- Soaw Department location in the province
- Country: Burkina Faso
- Province: Boulkiemdé Province

Area
  - Total: 72.6 sq mi (188.1 km^{2})

Population (2019)
  - Total: 22,039
  - Density: 303.5/sq mi (117.2/km^{2})
- Time zone: UTC+0 (GMT 0)

Soaw is a department or commune of Boulkiemdé Province in central Burkina Faso. As of 2005 it has a population of 17,004. Its capital lies at the town of Soaw.

== Towns and villages ==
· Soaw · Bokin · Kalwaka · Kolokom · Mongdin · Poéssé · Séguédin · Zoétgomdé
