= Petar Šegedin =

Petar Šegedin may refer to:

- Petar Šegedin (athlete) (1926–1994), Yugoslav middle and long-distance runner
- Petar Šegedin (writer) (1909–1998), Croatian writer
