= Boulkiemdé Province =

Coordinates: 12°15′N 2°22′W

Boulkiemdé
- Province
- Location in Burkina Faso

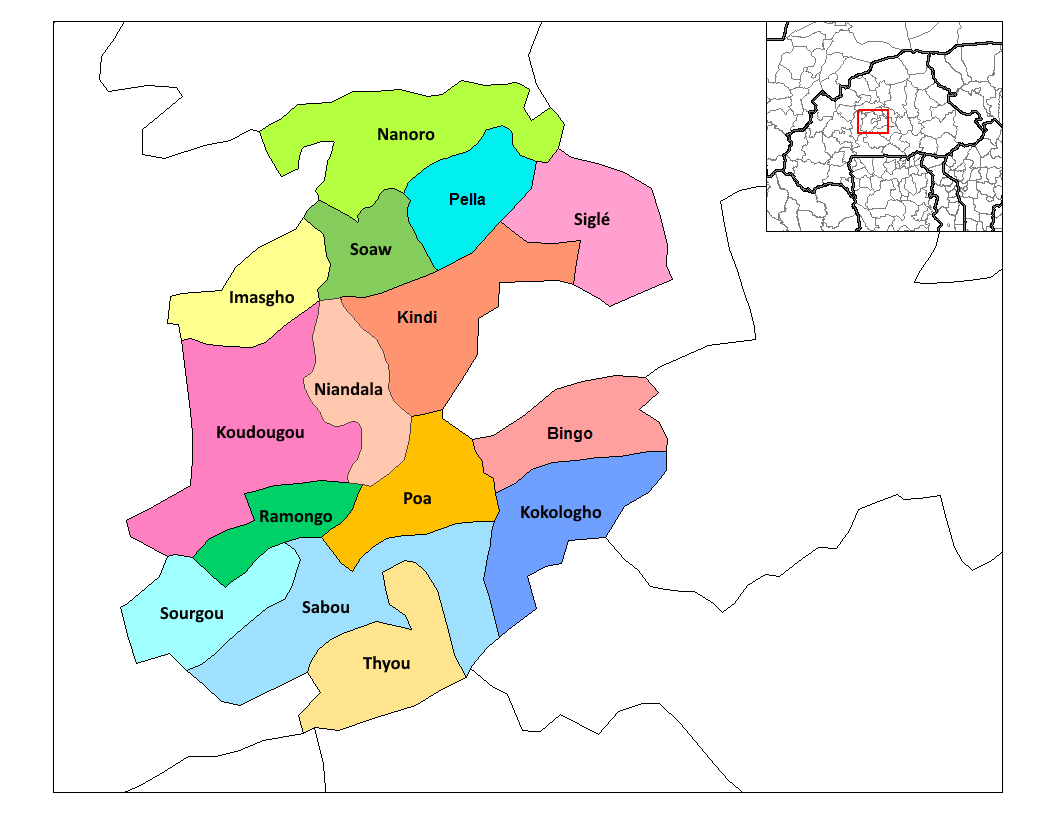
- Provincial map of its departments
- Country: Burkina Faso
- Region: Centre-Ouest Region
- Capital: Koudougou

Area
  - Province: 4,268 km^{2} (1,648 sq mi)

Population (2019 census)
  - Province: 689,184
  - Density: 161.5/km^{2} (418.2/sq mi)
  - Urban: 160,239
- Time zone: UTC+0 (GMT 0)
- ISO 3166 code: BF-BLK

Boulkiemdé is one of the 45 provinces of Burkina Faso and is in Centre-Ouest Region. The capital of Boulkiemdé is Koudougou. The population of Boulkiemdé was 498,008 in 2006 and 567,680 in 2011.

== Education ==
In 2011 the province had 437 primary schools and 65 secondary schools.

== Healthcare ==
In 2011 the province had 75 health and social promotion centers (Centres de santé et de promotion sociale), 20 doctors and 262 nurses.

== Departments ==
Boulkiemde is divided into 13 departments as follows:

Department	Capital	Population (Census 2006)
Bingo Department	Bingo	15,100
Imasgho Department	Imasgho	22,401
Kindi Department	Kindi	33,347
Kokologho Department	Kokologho	38,988
Koudougou Department	Koudougou	131,825
Nandiala Department	Nandiala	23,266
Nanoro Department	Nanoro	33,291
Pella Department	Pella	19,243
Poa Department	Poa	30,317
Ramongo Department	Ramongo	23,081
Sabou Department	Sabou	45,877
Siglé Department	Siglé	27,336
Soaw Department	Soaw	15,937
Sourgou Department	Sourgou	13,748
Thyou Department	Thyou	24,251

== In pop-culture ==
Boulkiemdé (specifically the department of Bingo) was a location in the American television series The Amazing Race 12 (2007).

== See also ==
- Regions of Burkina Faso
- Provinces of Burkina Faso
- Departments of Burkina Faso
