= Nando Region =

Region of Burkina Faso

Nando Centre-Ouest
- Region
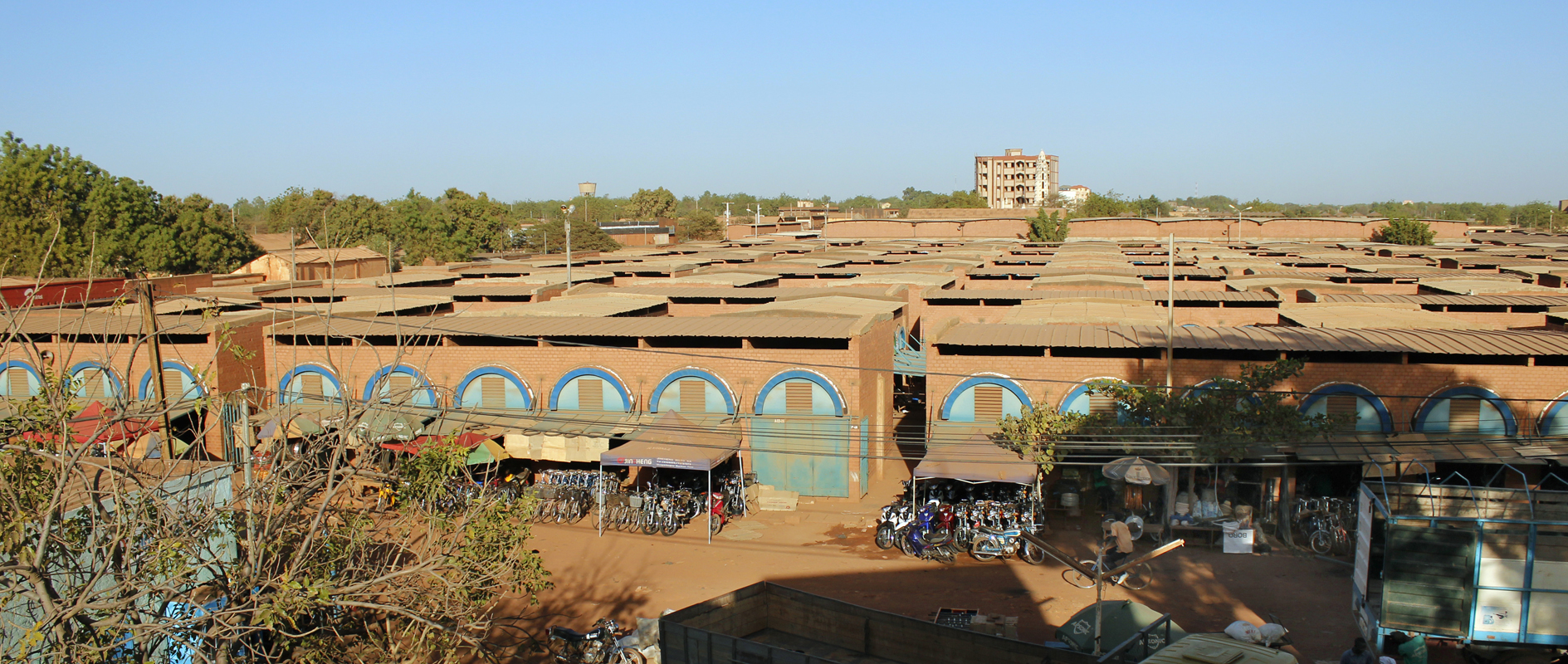
- The Grand Marché in Koudougou, the region's largest urban center.

- Location in Burkina Faso
- Coordinates: 11°45′N 2°15′W
- Country: Burkina Faso
- Capital: Koudougou

Area
  - Region: 8,388 sq mi (21,726 km^{2})

Population (2019 census)
  - Region: 1,659,339
  - Density: 197.81/sq mi (76.376/km^{2})
  - Urban: 272,200
- Time zone: UTC+0 (GMT 0)
- HDI (2017): 0.428 low · 5th

Nando, formerly known as Centre-Ouest ([sɑ̃tʁ.wɛst], "West Central"), is one of Burkina Faso's 17 administrative regions. The population of Nando was 1,659,339 in 2019. The region's capital is Koudougou. Four provinces (Boulkiemdé, Sanguié, Sissili, and Ziro) make up the region.

As of 2019, the population of the region was 1,659,339 with 53.7% females. The population in the region was 8.09% of the total population of the country. The child mortality rate was 61, infant mortality rate was 87 and the mortality of children under five was 142. As of 2007, the literacy rate in the region was 28.8%, compared to a national average of 28.3%. The coverage of cereal need compared to the total production of the region was 135%.

== Geography ==
Most of Burkina Faso is a wide plateau formed by riverine systems and is called falaise de Banfora. There are three major rivers, the Red Volta, Black Volta and White Volta, which cut through different valleys. The climate is generally hot, with unreliable rains across different seasons. Gold and quartz are common minerals found across the country, while manganese deposits are also common. The dry season is usually from October to May, and rains are common during the wet season from June to September. The soil texture is porous and hence the yield is also poor. The average elevation is around 200 m (660 ft) to 300 m (980 ft) above mean sea level. Among West African countries, Burkino Faso has the largest elephant population and the country is replete with game reserves. The southern regions are more tropical in nature and have Savannah and forests. The principal river is the Black Volta, that originates in the southern region and drains into Ghana. The areas near the rivers usually have flies like tsetse and similium, which are carriers of sleep sickness and river blindness. The average rainfall in the region is around 100 cm (39 in) compared to northern regions that receive only 25 cm (9.8 in) rainfall.

== Demographics ==
Historical population
Year	Pop.	±% p.a.
1985	787,229	—
1996	943,538	+1.66%
2006	1,186,566	+2.32%
2019	1,659,339	+2.61%

As of 2019, the population of the region was 1,659,339 with 53.7% females. The population in the region was 8.09% of the total population of the country. The child mortality rate was 61, infant mortality rate was 87 and the mortality of children under five was 142. As of 2007, among the working population, there were 59.3% employees, 18.9% under employed, 17.9% inactive people, 21.8% not working and 3.8% unemployed people in the region. The main languages spoken in Centre-Ouest as of 2006 were Moore, Lyele, and Numi. French is the official language throughout the country.

== Economy ==
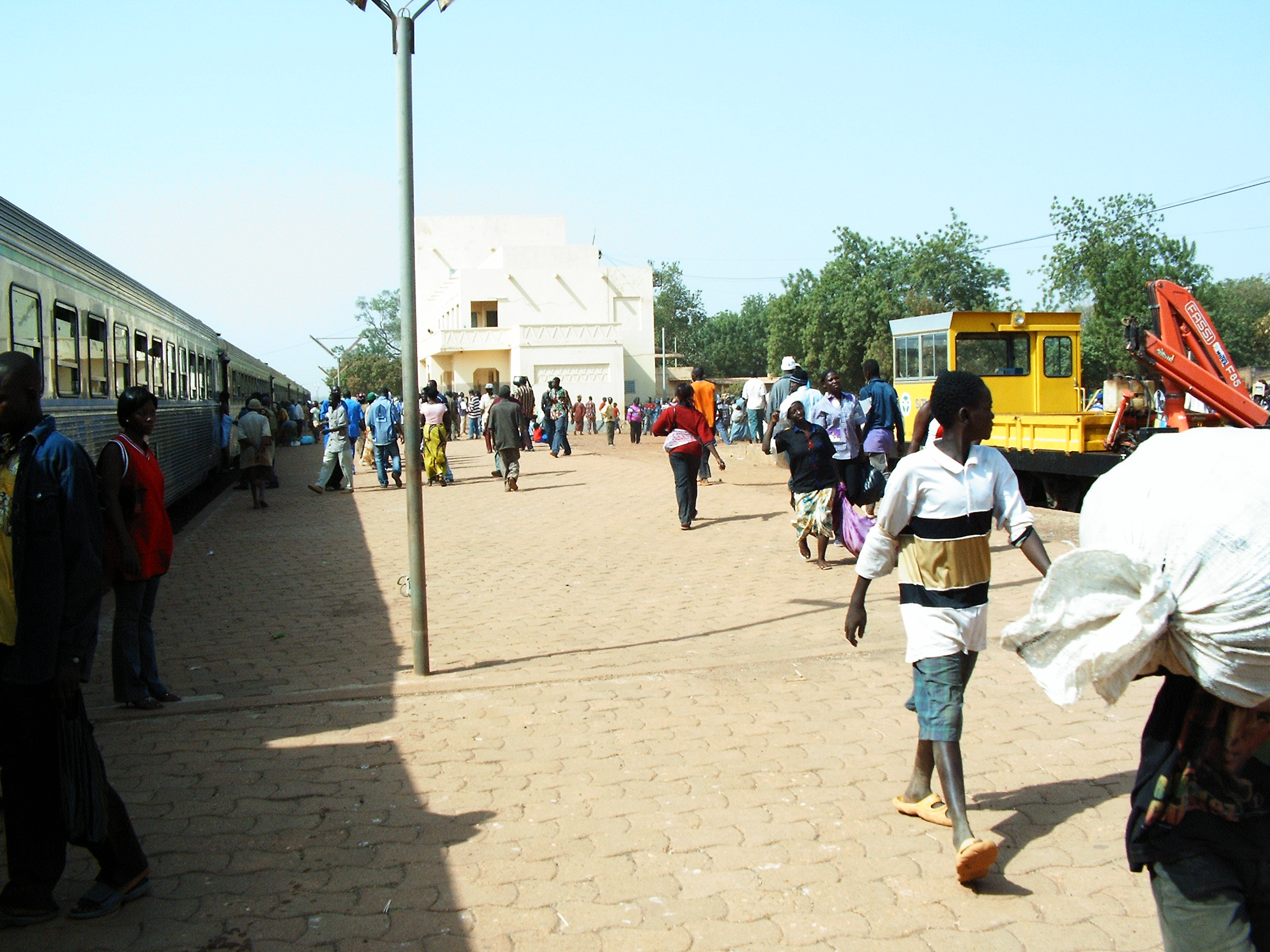
Koudougou train station

The main road connecting the national capital, Ouagadougou, and Burkina Faso's second largest city Bobo-Dioulasso traverses the province (east to west). Burkina Faso's only railway connects the region's largest city, Koudougou with Ouagadougou, Bobo-Dioulasso and Ivory Coast. There is no commercial airport in the province but Ouagadougou International Airport is approximately 141 km southeast of Koudougou and as of June 2014 the airport had regularly scheduled flights to most major cities in West Africa as well as Paris, Brussels and Istanbul. As of 2007, there were 678.1 km (421.4 mi) of highways, 231.8 km (144.0 mi) of regional roads and 634.7 km (394.4 mi) of county roads. The first set of car traffic was 38, first set of two-wheeler traffic was 3,166 and the total classified road network was 1,545. The total corn produced during 2015 was 121,780 tonnes, cotton was 27,059 tonnes, cowpea was 49,972 tonnes, ground nut was 43,284 tonnes, millet was 72,426 tonnes, rice was 16,215 tonnes and sorghum was 260,885 tonnes. The coverage of cereal need compared to the total production of the region was 135.00 per cent.

== Education ==
As of 2007, the literacy rate in the region was 28.8 per cent, compared to a national average of 28.3 per cent. The gross primary enrolment was 83.7 per cent, pos-primary was 26.9 per cent and gross secondary school enrolment was 8.8. There were 898 boys and 473 girls enrolled in the primary and post-secondary level. There were 49 teachers in primary & post-secondary level, while there were 926 teachers in post-primary and post-secondary level. Adult (15+) literacy in the region increased from 23,0% in 2003 to 28,3% in 2008. In 2011 the region had 1,002 primary schools and 112 secondary schools. The University of Koudougou is also located in the region and had around 5,400 students in 2010/2011. In 2010/11 10,1% of the population (aged 13–19) attended secondary school, which was below the national average of 10.7%.

== Provinces ==
Province	Capital	2006
Boulkiemdé Province	Koudougou	567,680
Sanguié Province	Réo	333,195
Sissili Province	Léo	240,830
Ziro Province	Sapouy	207,079

Burkina Faso gained independence from France in 1960. It was originally called Upper Volta. There have been military coups until 1983 when Captain Thomas Sankara took control and implemented radical left wing policies. He was ousted by Blaise Compaore, who continued for 27 years until 2014, when a popular uprising ended his rule. As per Law No.40/98/AN in 1998, Burkina Faso adhered to decentralization to provide administrative and financial autonomy to local communities. There are 13 administrative regions, each governed by a governor. The regions are subdivided into 45 provinces, which are further subdivided into 351 communes. The communes may be urban or rural and are interchangeable. There are other administrative entities like department and village. An urban commune has typically 10,000 people under it. If any commune is not able to get 75 per cent of its planned budget in revenues for 3 years, the autonomy is taken off. The communes are administered by elected mayors. The communes are stipulated to develop economic, social and cultural values of its citizens. A commune has financial autonomy and can interact with other communes, government agencies or international entities.
