= DeWitt Jones =

American football player and coach

Biographical details
- Born: c. 1943

Playing career
- 1962–1964: Abilene Christian
- Position: End

Coaching career (HC unless noted)
- 1965–1966: Highland Park HS (TX) (assistant)
- 1967: Ranger Park HS (TX) (assistant)
- 1968: Cooper HS (TX) (assistant)
- 1969–1970: Midland Lee HS (TX) (assistant)
- 1971: Midland HS (TX) (assistant)
- 1972–1974: Troup HS (TX)
- 1976: Abilene HS (TX)
- 1977–1978: Abilene Christian

Head coaching record
- Overall: 18–4–1 (college); 44–11–2 (high school)
- Tournaments: 2–0 (NAIA D-I playoffs)

Accomplishments and honors

Championships
- 1 NAIA Division I (1977); 1 LSC (1977)

Awards
- NAIA Coach of the Year (1977)

DeWitt Jones (born c. 1943) is an American former football coach. He was the 11th head football coach at Abilene Christian University in Abilene, Texas, serving two seasons, from 1977 to 1978, and compiling a record of 18–4–1 His coaching record at Abilene Christian was 18–4–1. In 1977, his team won the NAIA Division I National Football Championship. Jones was named the NAIA Division I National Coach of the Year.

Jones won a high school state championship in 1973 at Troup High School in Troup, Texas. He is one of two coaches in Texas who has won a state championship on the high school level and a national championship at the college level. In 2005, Jones was inducted into the Abilene Christian Sports Hall of Fame.

== Head coaching record ==
=== College ===
Year	Team	Overall	Conference	Standing	Bowl/playoffs
Abilene Christian Wildcats (Lone Star Conference) (1977–1978)
1977	Abilene Christian	11–1–1	5–1–1	T–1st	W NAIA Division I Championship
1978	Abilene Christian	7–3	5–2	2nd	
Abilene Christian:		18–4–1	10–3–1		
Total:		18–4–1			
National championship Conference title Conference division title or championship game berth
