= Ed Jasper =

American football player (1973–2022)

- Jasper in 2005

No. 74, 95
- Position: Defensive tackle

Personal information
- Born: January 18, 1973; Tyler, Texas, U.S.
- Died: April 14, 2022 (aged 49); Tyler, Texas, U.S.
- Listed height: 6 ft 2 in (1.88 m)
- Listed weight: 293 lb (133 kg)

Career information
- High school: Troup (Troup, Texas)
- College: Texas A&M
- NFL draft: 1997: 6th round, 198th overall pick

Career history
- Philadelphia Eagles (1997–1998); Atlanta Falcons (1999–2004); Oakland Raiders (2005); Philadelphia Eagles (2006)

Career NFL statistics
- Total tackles: 250
- Sacks: 17.0
- Forced fumbles: 4
- Fumble recoveries: 4
- Stats at Pro Football Reference

Edward Videl Jasper (January 18, 1973 – April 14, 2022) was an American professional football player who was a defensive tackle in the National Football League (NFL). He was selected by the Philadelphia Eagles in the sixth round of the 1997 NFL draft and played for the Eagles, Atlanta Falcons, and Oakland Raiders from 1997 to 2005.

== Early life ==
Jasper was born in Tyler, Texas, on January 18, 1973. He attended Troup High School, where he was a three-time All-East Texas and honored as Defensive Most Valuable Player. He was also part of the school's basketball team that won the University Interscholastic League Class 2A state championship in 1992.

== College career ==
After graduating from Troup, Jasper studied at Texas A&M University and played four seasons of college football for the Aggies. In his first year with the team in 1993, the Aggies won the Southwest Conference (SWC) title, before losing 24–21 to Notre Dame Fighting in the 1994 Cotton Bowl Classic. They finished 10–0–1 the following season, but were ineligible to defend their title. The Aggies switched from the SWC to the Big 12 Conference during Jasper's senior year in 1996. Although the team was 6–6 that season, he received honorable mention All-Big 12 honors. He was also conferred the Aggie Heart Award, as voted for by his teammates. He was subsequently drafted by the Philadelphia Eagles in the sixth round (198th overall selection) of the 1997 NFL draft.

== Professional career ==
Jasper made his NFL debut with the Eagles on September 15, 1997, at the age of 24, in a 21–20 loss against the Dallas Cowboys. After two seasons with the franchise, he joined the Atlanta Falcons in 1999. He had the most effective years of his career with the team, with arguably his best season coming in 2002, when he started all 16 games and helped the Falcons qualify for the playoffs that year. The franchise also qualified for the playoffs two years later, advancing to the NFC Championship Game. He went to the Oakland Raiders in 2005, where he tallied 2 sacks and 24 tackles in 15 games played. He retired at the conclusion of the 2005 season. During his nine-season NFL career, Jasper registered 250 tackles, 17 sacks, forced four fumbles, and made four fumble recoveries in 118 games played.

== NFL career statistics ==
Legend
**Bold**	Career high

=== Regular season ===
Year	Team	Games		Tackles				Interceptions				Fumbles			
Year	Team	GP	GS	Comb	Solo	Ast	Sck	Int	Yds	TD	Lng	FF	FR	Yds	TD
1997	PHI	10	1	8	5	3	1.0	0	0	0	0	0	0	0	0
1998	PHI	7	0	13	11	2	0.0	0	0	0	0	0	0	0	0
1999	ATL	13	0	28	23	5	0.0	0	0	0	0	0	0	0	0
2000	ATL	15	15	**42**	30	**12**	**3.5**	0	0	0	0	**2**	0	0	0
2001	ATL	16	1	25	20	5	**3.5**	0	0	0	0	0	0	0	0
2002	ATL	16	16	35	29	6	2.0	0	0	0	0	0	1	**7**	0
2003	ATL	14	14	41	**35**	6	3.0	0	0	0	0	0	1	0	0
2004	ATL	12	12	34	27	7	2.0	0	0	0	0	**2**	**2**	0	0
2005	OAK	15	1	24	23	1	2.0	0	0	0	0	0	0	0	0
		118	60	250	203	47	17.0	0	0	0	0	4	4	7	0

=== Playoffs ===
Year	Team	Games		Tackles				Interceptions				Fumbles			
Year	Team	GP	GS	Comb	Solo	Ast	Sck	Int	Yds	TD	Lng	FF	FR	Yds	TD
2002	ATL	2	2	**4**	**4**	0	0.0	0	0	0	0	0	0	0	0
2004	ATL	2	2	1	1	0	0.0	0	0	0	0	0	0	0	0
		4	4	5	5	0	0.0	0	0	0	0	0	0	0	0

== Personal life ==
Jasper's brother, Shane, served as president of the Troup Independent School District board. Jasper died on April 14, 2022, at the age of 49.
