= Sitton =

Sitton may refer to:

- Carl Sitton (1881–1931), Major League Baseball pitcher
- Charlie Sitton (born 1962), retired American basketball player
- Claude Sitton (1925–2015), American newspaper reporter, winner of the Pulitzer Prize for Commentary
- John Sitton (born 1959), English former professional footballer, former manager of Leyton Orient
- Josh Sitton (born 1986), American football offensive guard in the National Football League
- Ray B. Sitton (1923–2013), American lieutenant general, command pilot and navigator
- Ryan Sitton (born 1975), Texas politician
- Ted Sitton (1932–2016), former American football coach in the United States

== See also ==
- Sitton Gulch Creek, Georgia, USA
- Sittaon, Burkina Faso
- Sitton, Dean, California, USA
