= 1977 NCAA Division III football season =

American college football season

- Regular season: August – November 1977
- Playoffs: November – December 1977
- National championship: Garrett-Harrison Stadium; Phenix City, AL
- Champion: Widener

The 1977 NCAA Division III football season -- part of college football in the United States organized by the National Collegiate Athletic Association at the Division III level—began in August 1977, and concluded with the NCAA Division III Football Championship in December 1977 at Garrett-Harrison Stadium in Phenix City, Alabama. The Widener Pioneers won their first Division III championship, defeating the Wabash Little Giants by a final score of 39−36.

== Conference standings ==
1977 College Athletic Conference football standings
	Conf.					Overall
Team	W		L		T	W		L		T
Southwestern (TN) $	4	–	0	–	0	9	–	1	–	1
Rose–Hulman	3	–	1	–	0	5	–	5	–	0
Centre	1	–	3	–	0	3	–	6	–	0
Principia	1	–	3	–	0	2	–	6	–	0
Sewanee	1	–	3	–	0	2	–	7	–	0
$ – Conference champion

1977 College Conference of Illinois and Wisconsin football standings
	Conf.					Overall
Team	W		L		T	W		L		T
Illinois Wesleyan +	6	–	2	–	0	6	–	3	–	0
Millikin +	6	–	2	–	0	6	–	3	–	0
North Central (IL)	5	–	3	–	0	6	–	3	–	0
Carthage	4	–	4	–	0	5	–	4	–	0
Wheaton (IL)	4	–	4	–	0	5	–	4	–	0
Elmhurst	4	–	4	–	0	5	–	4	–	0
Augustana (IL)	4	–	4	–	0	4	–	5	–	0
Carroll (WI)	3	–	5	–	0	4	–	5	–	0
North Park	0	–	8	–	0	0	–	9	–	0
+ – Conference co-champions

1977 Independent College Athletic Conference football standings
	Conf.					Overall
Team	W		L		T	W		L		T
Ithaca $	4	–	0	–	0	6	–	3	–	0
Hobart	4	–	1	–	0	7	–	2	–	0
St. Lawrence	3	–	2	–	0	7	–	2	–	0
RPI	1	–	2	–	0	4	–	5	–	0
Alfred	1	–	3	–	0	4	–	5	–	0
RIT	0	–	5	–	0	0	–	8	–	1
$ – Conference champion

1977 Indiana Collegiate Conference football standings
	Conf.					Overall
Team	W		L		T	W		L		T
Saint Joseph's (IN) +	3	–	1	–	0	5	–	4	–	0
Butler +	3	–	1	–	0	5	–	5	–	0
Indiana Central	2	–	1	–	1	6	–	2	–	1
Valparaiso	1	–	2	–	1	3	–	6	–	1
Evansville	0	–	4	–	0	1	–	8	–	0
+ – Conference co-champions

1977 Iowa Conference football standings
	Conf.					Overall
Team	W		L		T	W		L		T
Central (IA) $^	7	–	0	–	0	9	–	1	–	0
Wartburg	6	–	1	–	0	7	–	2	–	0
Buena Vista	5	–	2	–	0	7	–	2	–	0
William Penn	3	–	4	–	0	6	–	4	–	0
Luther	3	–	4	–	0	5	–	5	–	0
Dubuque	2	–	5	–	0	4	–	6	–	0
Simpson (IA)	2	–	5	–	0	2	–	7	–	0
Upper Iowa	0	–	7	–	0	2	–	7	–	0
$ – Conference champion; ^ – NCAA Division III playoff participant

1977 Metropolitan Intercollegiate Conference football standings
	Conf.					Overall
Team	W		L		T	W		L		T
Fordham $	3	–	0	–	0	8	–	2	–	0
C. W. Post	3	–	0	–	0	5	–	3	–	1
Hofstra	3	–	2	–	0	6	–	3	–	0
Merchant Marine	1	–	2	–	0	3	–	6	–	0
Wagner	1	–	4	–	0	2	–	7	–	0
Seton Hall	0	–	3	–	0	3	–	5	–	0
$ – Conference champion

1977 Michigan Intercollegiate Athletic Association football standings
	Conf.					Overall
Team	W		L		T	W		L		T
Albion $^	5	–	0	–	0	8	–	2	–	0
Hope	4	–	1	–	0	6	–	3	–	0
Adrian	2	–	2	–	1	4	–	4	–	1
Alma	2	–	3	–	0	6	–	3	–	0
Kalamazoo	1	–	4	–	0	3	–	5	–	0
Olivet	0	–	4	–	1	0	–	8	–	1
$ – Conference champion; ^ – NCAA Division III playoff participant

1977 Middle Atlantic Conference football standings
	Conf.					Overall
Team	W		L		T	W		L		T
Northern Division
Albright x	5	–	1	–	0	7	–	2	–	0
Upsala	5	–	1	–	0	7	–	2	–	0
Lycoming	4	–	2	–	0	6	–	3	–	0
Juniata	3	–	3	–	0	5	–	5	–	0
Wilkes	3	–	3	–	0	4	–	5	–	0
Susquehanna	1	–	5	–	0	2	–	7	–	0
Delaware Valley	0	–	6	–	0	2	–	7	–	0
Southern Division
Widener x^	6	–	0	–	0	11	–	1	–	0
Franklin & Marshall	7	–	1	–	0	7	–	2	–	0
Dickinson	5	–	2	–	1	6	–	2	–	1
Muhlenberg	5	–	3	–	0	6	–	3	–	0
Swarthmore	4	–	4	–	1	4	–	4	–	1
Lebanon Valley	3	–	5	–	0	3	–	6	–	0
Western Maryland	2	–	4	–	1	2	–	6	–	1
Moravian	2	–	5	–	0	2	–	7	–	0
Ursinus	2	–	5	–	0	2	–	7	–	0
Johns Hopkins	0	–	8	–	1	1	–	8	–	1
Gettysburg *	1	–	1	–	0	3	–	7	–	0
x – Division champion/co-champions; ^ – NCAA Division III playoff participant; * – Ineligible due to insufficient conference games

1977 Midwest Conference football standings
	Conf.					Overall
Team	W		L		T	W		L		T
East Division
Ripon xy$	4	–	0	–	0	8	–	1	–	0
Lawrence	3	–	1	–	0	8	–	1	–	0
Lake Forest	2	–	2	–	0	4	–	4	–	0
Chicago	1	–	3	–	0	2	–	6	–	0
Beloit	0	–	4	–	0	0	–	9	–	0
West Division
Cornell (IA) xy	5	–	0	–	0	8	–	1	–	0
Coe	4	–	1	–	0	5	–	4	–	0
Monmouth (IL)	3	–	2	–	0	5	–	4	–	0
Grinnell	1	–	3	–	1	4	–	4	–	1
Knox	1	–	3	–	1	3	–	5	–	1
Carleton	0	–	5	–	0	1	–	7	–	0
Championship: Ripon 10, Cornell (IA) 7
$ – Conference champion; x – Division champion/co-champions; y – Championship game participant

1977 Minnesota Intercollegiate Athletic Conference football standings
	Conf.					Overall
Team	W		L		T	W		L		T
Saint John's (MN) $^	7	–	0	–	0	7	–	2	–	0
Concordia–Moorhead	5	–	2	–	0	7	–	3	–	0
Gustavus Adolphus	5	–	2	–	0	6	–	4	–	0
St. Thomas (MN)	3	–	3	–	1	4	–	5	–	1
Augsburg	3	–	4	–	0	3	–	6	–	0
St. Olaf	2	–	4	–	1	5	–	4	–	1
Hamline	2	–	5	–	0	2	–	7	–	0
Macalester	0	–	7	–	0	0	–	9	–	0
$ – Conference champion; ^ – NCAA Division III playoff participant

1977 New England Football Conference standings
	Conf.					Overall
Team	W		L		T	W		L		T
Massachusetts Maritime $	7	–	1	–	0	8	–	1	–	0
Bridgewater State	5	–	3	–	0	6	–	3	–	0
Maine Maritime	5	–	3	–	0	5	–	3	–	0
Boston State	4	–	3	–	1	4	–	4	–	1
Curry	4	–	4	–	0	5	–	4	–	0
Nichols	4	–	4	–	0	5	–	4	–	0
New Haven	3	–	5	–	0	3	–	5	–	0
Framingham State	2	–	6	–	0	3	–	6	–	0
Plymouth State	1	–	6	–	1	2	–	6	–	1
$ – Conference champion

1977 New Jersey State Athletic Conference football standings
	Conf.					Overall
Team	W		L		T	W		L		T
Glassboro State $	5	–	0	–	0	7	–	3	–	0
Montclair State	3	–	2	–	0	6	–	4	–	0
Trenton State	3	–	2	–	0	4	–	5	–	0
Kean	2	–	2	–	1	3	–	6	–	1
William Paterson	1	–	3	–	1	4	–	4	–	1
Jersey City State	0	–	5	–	0	1	–	8	–	0
$ – Conference champion

1977 Northern Intercollegiate Conference football standings
	Conf.					Overall
Team	W		L		T	W		L		T
Minnesota Morris $^	7	–	0	–	0	10	–	2	–	0
Bemidji State	5	–	2	–	0	6	–	4	–	0
Moorhead State	5	–	2	–	0	6	–	4	–	0
Minnesota Duluth	4	–	3	–	0	7	–	3	–	0
St. Cloud State	4	–	3	–	0	5	–	6	–	0
Michigan Tech	1	–	6	–	0	3	–	7	–	0
Winona State	1	–	6	–	0	3	–	7	–	0
Southwest State (MN)	1	–	6	–	0	1	–	8	–	0
$ – Conference champion; ^ – NCAA Division III playoff participant

1977 Ohio Athletic Conference football standings
	Conf.					Overall
Team	W		L		T	W		L		T
Blue Division
Baldwin–Wallace xy$	5	–	0	–	0	9	–	1	–	0
Otterbein	4	–	1	–	0	8	–	1	–	0
Marietta	3	–	2	–	0	3	–	6	–	0
Mount Union	2	–	3	–	0	4	–	5	–	0
Ohio Wesleyan	1	–	4	–	0	2	–	6	–	1
Denison	0	–	5	–	0	0	–	8	–	1
Red Division
Wittenberg xy	5	–	0	–	0	9	–	1	–	0
Muskingum	4	–	1	–	0	7	–	2	–	0
Wooster	3	–	2	–	0	6	–	3	–	0
Capital	2	–	3	–	0	5	–	4	–	0
Ohio Northern	1	–	4	–	0	2	–	7	–	0
Heidelberg	0	–	5	–	0	1	–	8	–	0
Not competing for championship
Kenyon			–			4	–	5	–	0
Oberlin			–			2	–	7	–	0
Championship: Baldwin–Wallace 14, Wittenberg 7
$ – Conference champion; x – Division champion/co-champions; y – Championship game participant

1977 Old Dominion Athletic Conference football standings
	Conf.					Overall
Team	W		L		T	W		L		T
Hampden–Sydney $^	4	–	0	–	0	9	–	2	–	0
Randolph–Macon	2	–	1	–	1	4	–	5	–	1
Emory & Henry	2	–	2	–	0	3	–	7	–	0
Washington and Lee	1	–	3	–	0	3	–	8	–	0
Bridgewater	0	–	3	–	1	3	–	5	–	1
$ – Conference champion; ^ – NCAA Division III playoff participant

1977 Pennsylvania State Athletic Conference football standings
	Conf.					Overall
Team	W		L		T	W		L		T
East Division
No. 4 Millersville xy	5	–	0	–	0	8	–	2	–	0
Kutztown	4	–	1	–	0	7	–	2	–	0
East Stroudsburg	3	–	2	–	0	6	–	2	–	0
Bloomsburg	2	–	3	–	0	4	–	5	–	0
Cheyney	1	–	4	–	0	4	–	5	–	0
Mansfield	0	–	5	–	0	2	–	6	–	1
West Division
No. 8 Clarion xy$	5	–	0	–	1	9	–	0	–	1
Shippensburg	4	–	2	–	0	6	–	4	–	0
Slippery Rock	3	–	2	–	1	4	–	4	–	1
Lock Haven	3	–	3	–	0	5	–	5	–	0
Indiana (PA)	2	–	3	–	1	4	–	4	–	1
Edinboro	2	–	3	–	1	3	–	6	–	1
California (PA)	0	–	6	–	0	2	–	8	–	0
Championship: Clarion 25, Millersville 24
$ – Conference champion; x – Division champion/co-champions; y – Championship game participant; Rankings from NAIA Division I poll

1977 Presidents' Athletic Conference football standings
	Conf.					Overall
Team	W		L		T	W		L		T
Carnegie Mellon $	7	–	0	–	0	8	–	1	–	0
Allegheny	5	–	2	–	0	5	–	3	–	0
Case Western Reserve	5	–	2	–	0	5	–	4	–	0
Washington & Jefferson	3	–	3	–	1	4	–	4	–	1
Hiram	3	–	4	–	0	3	–	6	–	0
Thiel	2	–	4	–	1	2	–	5	–	1
Bethany (WV)	2	–	5	–	0	2	–	7	–	0
John Carroll	0	–	7	–	0	2	–	7	–	0
$ – Conference champion

1977 Southern California Intercollegiate Athletic Conference football standings
	Conf.					Overall
Team	W		L		T	W		L		T
Redlands $	5	–	0	–	0	6	–	3	–	0
No. T–14 Whittier	4	–	1	–	0	8	–	2	–	0
Occidental	3	–	2	–	0	5	–	4	–	0
La Verne	2	–	3	–	0	4	–	5	–	0
Claremont-Mudd	1	–	4	–	0	1	–	7	–	0
Pomona-Pitzer	0	–	5	–	0	0	–	8	–	0
$ – Conference champion; Redlands forfeited two non-conference wins.; Rankings from NAIA Division II poll

1977 Wisconsin State University Conference football standings
	Conf.					Overall
Team	W		L		T	W		L		T
No. 6 Wisconsin–Stevens Point $^	7	–	0	–	1	8	–	2	–	1
Wisconsin–Whitewater	6	–	2	–	0	7	–	4	–	0
Wisconsin–La Crosse	5	–	2	–	1	6	–	2	–	2
Wisconsin–Platteville	5	–	3	–	0	7	–	3	–	0
Wisconsin–Oshkosh	3	–	5	–	0	5	–	5	–	0
Wisconsin–Eau Claire	3	–	5	–	0	5	–	6	–	0
Wisconsin–River Falls	3	–	5	–	0	4	–	6	–	0
Wisconsin–Stout	2	–	6	–	0	2	–	8	–	0
Wisconsin–Superior	1	–	7	–	0	1	–	9	–	0
$ – Conference champion; ^ – NAIA Division I playoff participant; Rankings from NAIA Division I poll

1977 NCAA Division III independents football records
	Conf.			Overall
Team	W	L	T	W		L		T
Wabash ^		–		11	–	2	–	0
Albany ^		–		9	–	2	–	0
Norwich		–		7	–	2	–	0
Maryville (TN)		–		6	–	2	–	0
Dayton		–		8	–	3	–	0
Canisius		–		5	–	2	–	2
Rochester (NY)		–		6	–	3	–	0
Ashland		–		6	–	4	–	0
Grove City		–		6	–	4	–	0
James Madison		–		5	–	5	–	0
Salisbury State		–		5	–	5	–	0
Brockport		–		4	–	5	–	0
Fairleigh Dickinson–Florham		–		4	–	5	–	0
Saint Mary's		–		4	–	5	–	0
Colorado College		–		3	–	6	–	0
Union (NY)		–		2	–	5	–	1
Bowie State		–		3	–	7	–	0
San Diego		–		3	–	7	–	0
Saint Peter's		–		2	–	5	–	0
Millsaps		–		2	–	6	–	0
Georgetown		–		2	–	7	–	0
Cortland		–		2	–	8	–	0
Plattsburgh		–		1	–	6	–	1
DePauw		–		1	–	9	–	0
St. Norbert		–		0	–	10	–	0
$ – Conference champion; ^ – NCAA Division III playoff participant

== Conference champions ==
Conference champions
- College Athletic Conference – Southwestern at Memphis
- College Conference of Illinois and Wisconsin – Illinois Wesleyan and Millikin
- Independent College Athletic Conference – Champion Unknown
- Iowa Intercollegiate Athletic Conference – Central (IA)
- Michigan Intercollegiate Athletic Association – Albion
- Middle Atlantic Conference – Albright (North), Widener (South)
- Midwest Collegiate Athletic Conference – Ripon
- Minnesota Intercollegiate Athletic Conference – Saint John's (MN)
- New England Football Conference – Massachusetts Maritime
- New Jersey State Athletic Conference – Glassboro State
- Northwest Conference – Linfield
- Old Dominion Athletic Conference – Hampden–Sydney
- Pennsylvania State Athletic Conference – Clarion
- Southern Intercollegiate Athletic Conference (Division III) – Clark Atlanta and Miles
- Southern California Intercollegiate Athletic Conference – Redlands
- Texas Intercollegiate Athletic Association – Tarleton State
- Twin Rivers Conference – Concordia–St. Paul
- Wisconsin Intercollegiate Athletic Conference – Wisconsin–Stevens Point

== Postseason ==
The 1977 NCAA Division III Football Championship playoffs were the fifth annual single-elimination tournament to determine the national champion of men's NCAA Division III college football. The championship game was held at Garrett-Harrison Stadium in Phenix City, Alabama for the fifth consecutive year. Like the previous two championships, eight teams competed in this edition.

=== Playoff bracket ===
Quarterfinals; Campus Sites
Minnesota–Morris	13
Albion	10
Wabash	20
Saint John's (MN)	9
Widener	19
Central (IA)	0
Albany	51
Hampden–Sydney	41

Semifinals; Campus Sites
Minnesota–Morris	21
Wabash	37
Widener	33
Albany	15

National Championship Game; Garrett-Harrison Stadium; Phenix City, AL
Wabash	36
Widener	39

== See also ==
- 1977 NCAA Division I football season
- 1977 NCAA Division II football season
- 1977 NAIA Division I football season
- 1977 NAIA Division II football season
