= Godo =

Godo may refer to several places:

- Several places in Boulkiemdé Province, Burkina Faso:
  - Godo, Nanoro
  - Godo, Pella
- Gōdo, Gifu, a town in Japan

== Other uses ==
- Sabri Godo (1929–2011), Albanian politician, writer and scriptwriter
- Grupo Godó, a Spanish media conglomerate based in Barcelona
- Count of Godó Trophy, a tennis tournament currently known as Barcelona Open
