= List of Abilene Christian Wildcats men's basketball head coaches =

The following is a list of Abilene Christian Wildcats men's basketball head coaches. The Wildcats have had 15 head coaches in their 105-season history.

Abilene Christian's current head coach is Brette Tanner. He was promoted to head coach in April 2021 to replace Joe Golding, who left to become the head coach at UTEP.

No.	Tenure	Coach	Years	Record	Pct.
1	1919–1920	Vernon McCasland	1	4–3	.571
2	1920–1921	G. C. Morlan	1	0–2	.000
3	1921–1922	Dad Noles	1	5–2	.714
4	1922–1924	Victor Payne	2	11–8	.579
5	1924–1955 (Note: Abilene Christian did not field a team for the 1943–44 and 1944–45 seasons.)	A. B. Morris	29	306–248	.552
6	1955–1969; 1988–1990	Dee Nutt	16	208–201	.509
7	1969–1973	Garnie Hatch	4	50–51	.495
8	1973–1980	Willard Tate	7	119–79	.601
9	1980–1988; 1999–2002	Mike Martin	11	148–152	.493
–	1990–1991*	Darryn Shearmire	1	0–26	.000
10	1991–1996	Tony Mauldin	5	61–78	.439
11	1996–1999	Shanon Hays	3	58–26	.690
12	2002–2005	Klint Pleasant	3	33–48	.407
13	2005–2011	Jason Copeland	6	65–96	.404
14	2011–2021	Joe Golding	10	158–144	.523
15	2021–present	Brette Tanner	5	84–81	.509
Totals		15 coaches	105 seasons	1,308–1,242	.513
Records updated through end of 2025–26 season * - Denotes interim head coach. Source
