= Dacissé =

Dacissé may refer to:

- Dacissé, Nanoro
- Dacissé, Siglé
