= Bob Strader =

American football player and coach (born 1953)

Biographical details
- Born: January 22, 1953 (age 73)

Playing career
- 1972–1975: Abilene Christian
- Position: Cornerback

Coaching career (HC unless noted)
- 1976–1984: Abilene Christian (DB)
- 1993–1995: Abilene Christian
- 1996: Abilene Christian (DC)

Head coaching record
- Overall: 14–17

Robert Strader Jr. (born January 22, 1953) is an American former college football coach. He was the 15th head football coach at Abilene Christian University in Abilene, Texas, serving for three seasons, from 1993 to 1995, and compiling a record of 14–17.

== Early life and playing career ==
Strader is the son of an army general who moved frequently during his early years, ultimately landing in Junction City, Kansas, where he attended high school. There he quarterbacked the Junction City Blue Jays to a one loss season and the 4A State Championship in 1969 in the first high school state playoffs in Kansas. After high school, he walked on at Abilene Christian University (ACU) in Abilene, Texas, where he started 27 games as a cornerback over four seasons, from 1972 to 1975. During that time, he helped the team compile a record of 27–16–1 and win the Lone Star Conference title and the NAIA Division I National Championship in 1973. He played with notable teammates Wilbert Montgomery and Clint Longley.

== Coaching career ==
Upon graduating, from Abilene Christian in 1976, Strader became the defensive secondary at his alma mater, serving from 1976 to 1984 helping the team a record of 60–34–2. After stints as the Director of Athletic Development and Dean of Students, he came back to the football field as the head coach at Abilene Christian in 1993. Strader was the 15th head coach of the Wildcats, leading the team for three seasons and compiling a record of 14–17. After the 1995 season, Jack Kiser took over as head coach and Strader became the defensive coordinator for the 1996 season, when the team achieved a 6–4 record.

== Education ==
Strader holds multiple degrees including a Bachelor of Science in Secondary Education earned in 1976 from Abilene Christian, a Master of Education in Education Administration earned in 1985 from Abilene Christian, a Doctor of Education in Education Leadership earned in 1993 from Texas Tech University, and a Master of Divinity in Old Testament earned in 2007 from Abilene Christian.

== Academic career and ministry ==
After coaching, Strader moved into the classroom at Abilene Christian.where he taught undergraduate courses in the College of Bible, Missions and Ministry, which included Message of the Old Testament and Christianity in Culture. In addition to his teaching duties, from 1998 to 2012, he was the Director of Leadership Camps at Abilene Christian, where he developed and managed large scale summer camp programs to influence the spiritual development of hundreds young campers age 8-18. From 2012 to 2014 he served as the Director of Ministry Service and then later as the Director of Residence Life, Education and Housing.

Strader now serves as a mentor and consultant to "A House on Beekman” ministry in Bronx, New York and as a pastor at Christ Community Church in Arlington, Texas.

== Head coaching record ==
Year	Team	Overall	Conference	Standing	Bowl/playoffs
Abilene Christian Wildcats (Lone Star Conference) (1993–1995)
1993	Abilene Christian	7–3	3–5	T–2nd	
1994	Abilene Christian	3–7	0–5	6th	
1995	Abilene Christian	4–7	2–5	6th	
Abilene Christian:		14–17	5–15		
Total:		14–17			
