= Ron Steiner =

American football and baseball coach (1938–2015)

Biographical details
- Born: April 30, 1938; Iron Mountain, Michigan, U.S.
- Died: July 31, 2015 (aged 77)

Playing career

Football
- 1957–1959: Wisconsin

Basketball
- 1957–1960: Wisconsin
- Position: Running back (football)

Coaching career (HC unless noted)

Football
- 1963–1964: Fennimore HS (WI)
- 1965–1966: Ishpeming HS (MI)
- 1967: Winona State (GA)
- 1968–1976: Wisconsin–Stevens Point (assistant)
- 1977–1981: Wisconsin–Stevens Point

Baseball
- 1976: Wisconsin–Stevens Point
- 1983–1986: Wisconsin–Stevens Point

Wrestling
- 1963–1965: Fennimore HS (WI)

Head coaching record
- Overall: 26–24–1 (college football); 57–75 (college baseball)
- Tournaments: Football; 0–1 (NAIA D-II playoffs)

Accomplishments and honors

Championships
- Football; 1 WSUC (1977)

Ronald John Steiner (April 30, 1938 – July 31, 2015) was an American football and baseball coach. He served as the head football coach at University of Wisconsin–Stevens Point from 1977 to 1981, compiling a record of 26–24–1. Steiner was also the head baseball coach at Wisconsin–Stevens Point in 1976 and again from 1983 to 1986, tallying a mark of 57–75.

Steiner played college football at the University of Wisconsin at Madison.

== Head coaching record ==
=== College football ===
Year	Team	Overall	Conference	Standing	Bowl/playoffs
Wisconsin–Stevens Point Pointers (Wisconsin State University Conference) (1977–1981)
1977	Wisconsin–Stevens Point	8–2–1	7–0–1	1st	L NAIA Division I Semifinal
1978	Wisconsin–Stevens Point	4–6	2–6	T–7th	
1979	Wisconsin–Stevens Point	5–5	4–4	T–4th	
1980	Wisconsin–Stevens Point	4–6	2–6	T–7th	
1981	Wisconsin–Stevens Point	5–5	4–4	T–4th	
Wisconsin–Stevens Point:		26–24–1	19–20–1		
Total:		26–24–1			
National championship Conference title Conference division title or championship game berth
