= 1977 Sam Houston State Bearkats football team =

American college football season

1977 Sam Houston State Bearkats football
- Conference: Lone Star Conference
- Record: 1–10 (1–6 LSC)
- Head coach: Billy Tidwell (4th season)
- Home stadium: Pritchett Field

1977 Lone Star Conference football standings
	Conf.					Overall
Team	W		L		T	W		L		T
No. 2 Abilene Christian +^	5	–	1	–	1	11	–	1	–	1
No. 3 Texas A&I +	5	–	1	–	1	8	–	1	–	1
No. 11 Angelo State	5	–	2	–	0	8	–	2	–	0
No. 15 Southwest Texas State	5	–	2	–	0	5	–	4	–	0
No. 13 East Texas State	4	–	3	–	0	7	–	4	–	0
Stephen F. Austin	2	–	5	–	0	2	–	8	–	0
Sam Houston State	1	–	6	–	0	1	–	10	–	0
Howard Payne	0	–	7	–	0	2	–	8	–	0
$ – Conference champion; ^ – NAIA Division I playoff participant; Rankings from NAIA Division I poll

The 1977 Sam Houston State Bearkats football team represented Sam Houston State University as a member of the Lone Star Conference (LSC) during the 1977 NAIA Division I football season. Led by fourth-year head coach Billy Tidwell, the Bearkats compiled an overall record of 1–10 with a mark of 1–6 in conference play, and finished seventh in the LSC.

== Schedule ==
Date	Opponent	Site	Result	Source
September 3	Cameron*	Pritchett Field; Huntsville, TX	L 16–19	
September 10	Southwestern Oklahoma State*	Pritchett Field; Huntsville, TX	L 0–16	
September 17	Southeastern Louisiana*	Pritchett Field; Huntsville, TX	L 0–20	
September 24	at Angelo State	San Angelo Stadium; San Angelo, TX	L 3–14	
October 8	at East Texas State	Memorial Stadium; Commerce, TX	L 7–31	
October 15	at Southwest Texas State	Evans Field; San Marcos, TX	L 5–16	
October 22	Texas A&I	Pritchett Field; Huntsville, TX	L 20–34	
October 29	at Howard Payne	Cen-Tex Stadium; Brownwood, TX	W 28–9	
November 5	Abilene Christian	Pritchett Field; Huntsville, TX	L 18–41	
November 12	Angelo State	Pritchett Field; Huntsville, TX	L 15–29	
November 19	at Stephen F. Austin	Lumberjack Stadium; Nacogdoches, TX (rivalry)	L 13–17	
*Non-conference game
