= Nanoro Department =

Coordinates: 12°41′N 2°11′W

Nanoro
- Department
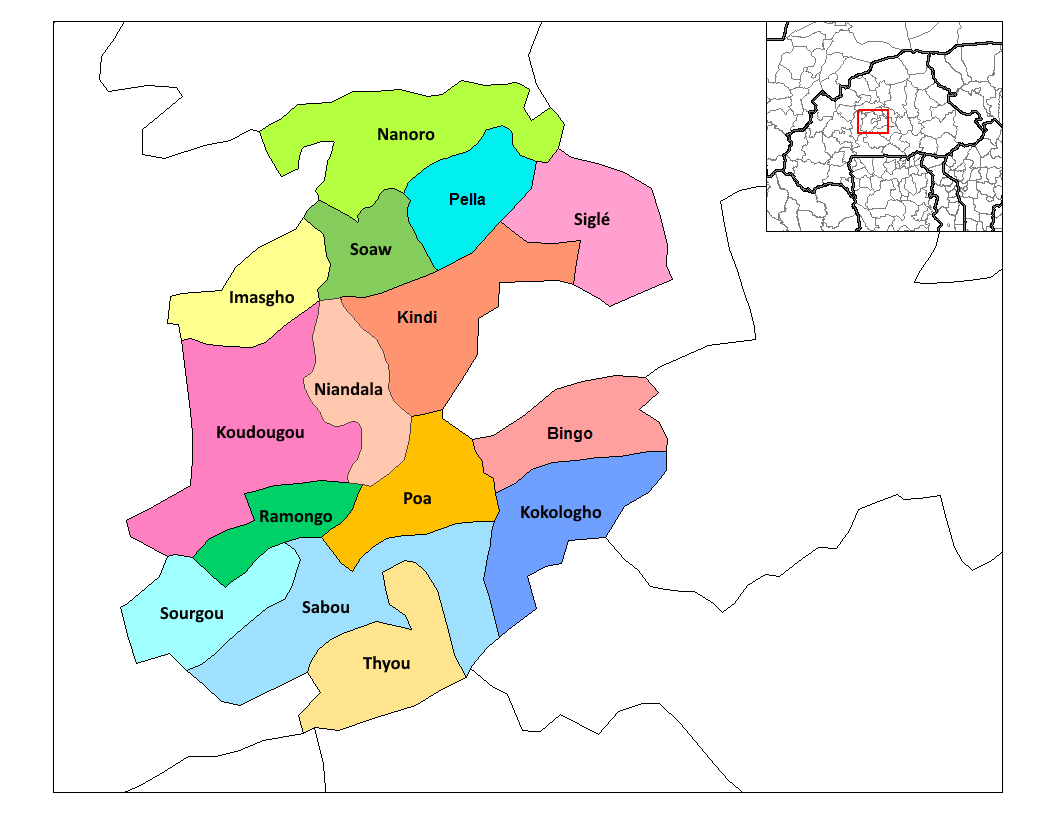
- Nanoro Department location in the province
- Country: Burkina Faso
- Province: Boulkiemdé Province

Population (2019)
  - Total: 47,914
- Time zone: UTC+0 (GMT 0)

Nanoro is a department or commune of Boulkiemdé Province in central Burkina Faso. As of 2005 it has a population of 33,511. Its capital lies at the town of Nanoro.

== Towns and villages ==
· Nanoro · Basziri · Boulpon · Dacissé · Godo · Goulouré · Gouroumbila · Kokolo · Nazoanga · Poéssi · Séguédin · Sittaon · Soala · Soum · Simidin
