= Soum, Boulkiemdé =

Soum
- Country: Burkina Faso
- Region: Centre-Ouest Region
- Province: Boulkiemdé Province
- Department: Nanoro Department

Population (2019)
  - Total: 3,441
- Time zone: UTC+0 (GMT 0)

Soum is a town in the Nanoro Department of Boulkiemdé Province in central western Burkina Faso.

Population
Year	Pop.	±%
1985	1,546	—
2006	2,458	+59.0%
2019	3,441	+40.0%
