= Simidin =

Simidin Zimidin
- Location in Burkina Faso
- Coordinates: 12.6211°N 2.1628°W
- Country: Burkina Faso
- Region: Centre-Ouest Region
- Province: Boulkiemdé Province
- Department: Nanoro Department

Population (2019)
  - Total: 1,440
- Time zone: UTC+0 (GMT 0)

Simidin is a village in the Nanoro Department of Boulkiemdé Province in central western Burkina Faso.

Population
Year	Pop.	±%
1985	777	—
2006	936	+20.5%
2019	1,440	+53.8%
