= Gouroumbila =

- Country: Burkina Faso
- Region: Centre-Ouest Region
- Province: Boulkiemdé Province
- Department: Nanoro Department

Population (2019)
  - Total: 1,006
- Time zone: UTC+0 (GMT 0)

Gouroumbila is a town in the Nanoro Department of Boulkiemdé Province in central western Burkina Faso.

Population
Year	Pop.	±%
1985	461	—
2006	628	+36.2%
2019	1,006	+60.2%
