= 1977 Widener Pioneers football team =

American college football season

1977 Widener Pioneers football

NCAA Division III champion MAC Southern Division champion

Stagg Bowl, W 39–36 vs. Wabash
- Conference: Middle Atlantic Conference
- Southern Division
- Record: 11–1 (6–0 MAC)
- Head coach: Bill Manlove (9th season)

1977 Middle Atlantic Conference football standings
	Conf.					Overall
Team	W		L		T	W		L		T
Northern Division
Albright x	5	–	1	–	0	7	–	2	–	0
Upsala	5	–	1	–	0	7	–	2	–	0
Lycoming	4	–	2	–	0	6	–	3	–	0
Juniata	3	–	3	–	0	5	–	5	–	0
Wilkes	3	–	3	–	0	4	–	5	–	0
Susquehanna	1	–	5	–	0	2	–	7	–	0
Delaware Valley	0	–	6	–	0	2	–	7	–	0
Southern Division
Widener x^	6	–	0	–	0	11	–	1	–	0
Franklin & Marshall	7	–	1	–	0	7	–	2	–	0
Dickinson	5	–	2	–	1	6	–	2	–	1
Muhlenberg	5	–	3	–	0	6	–	3	–	0
Swarthmore	4	–	4	–	1	4	–	4	–	1
Lebanon Valley	3	–	5	–	0	3	–	6	–	0
Western Maryland	2	–	4	–	1	2	–	6	–	1
Moravian	2	–	5	–	0	2	–	7	–	0
Ursinus	2	–	5	–	0	2	–	7	–	0
Johns Hopkins	0	–	8	–	1	1	–	8	–	1
Gettysburg *	1	–	1	–	0	3	–	7	–	0
x – Division champion/co-champions; ^ – NCAA Division III playoff participant; * – Ineligible due to insufficient conference games

The 1977 Widener Pioneers football team represented Widener University as a member of the Middle Atlantic Conference (MAC) during the 1977 NCAA Division III football season. In their ninth season under head coach Bill Manlove, the Pride compiled an 11–1 record and won the NCAA Division III championship.

The team lost to Fordham in the second game of the season – Widener's first home defeat since 1970. The Fordham loss was followed by a 10-game winning streak. In the NCAA Division III playoffs, the Pioneers shut out Central (Iowa) (17–0) on the road. In the semifinals, the Pioneers defeated Albany as Chip Zawoiski carried a record 31 times for 171 rushing yards.

In the Amos Alonzo Stagg Bowl, Widener faced Wabash. The Pioneers won, 39–36, in a game that featured five lead changes. Widener ultimately pulled ahead with two fourth-quarter touchdowns on passes of 25 and 70 yards from Mark Walter to Walker Carter.

The team played its home games in Chester, Pennsylvania.

== Schedule ==
Date	Opponent	Site	Result	Attendance	Source
September 17	Lebanon Valley	Chester, PA	W 28–0	3,000	
September 24	Fordham*	Chester, PA	L 14–19	3,500	
October 1	at Moravian	Bethlehem, PA	W 13–9	1,200	
October 8	at New York Tech*	Old Westbury, NY	W 35–6	500	
October 15	Johns Hopkins	Chester, PA	W 17–6	3,000–4,500	
October 22	Franklin & Marshall	Chester, PA	W 42–12	5,000	
October 29	at Ursinus	500; Collegeville, PA	W 56–6	362	
November 5	at Delaware Valley	Doylestown, PA	W 50–27	500	
November 12	at Swarthmore	Swarthmore, PA	W 32–3	1,000	
November 19	at Central (IA)*	Pella, IA (NCAA Division III quarterfinal)	W 19–0		
November 26	Albany*	Chester, PA (NCAA Division III semifinal)	W 33–15	3,000	
December 3	vs. Wabash*	Phenix City, AL (Stagg Bowl—NCAA Division III championship game)	W 39–36	7,852	
*Non-conference game

== Statistical leaders and awards ==
The team's statistical leaders included senior tailback Chip Zawoiski with 1,576 rushing yards and 21 touchdowns and quarterback Mark Walter with 1,312 passing yards and 15 touchdowns.

Zawoiski was named the MAC most valuable player (tying with John Green of Franklin Y Marshall), and coach Manlove received MAC Coach of the Year honors for the fourth consecutive year. A total of ten Widener players received first-team All-MAC honors: Zawoiski; split end Walker Carter; offensive tackle Bob Brewster; offensive guard Andy Martin; kicker John Ferko; defensive end Tim Erlacher; defensive tackle Jim "Bubba" Carter; linebackers Eddie Fulmer and Wayne Pierce; and defensive back Ted Kukawaski.

The 1977 team was inducted as a group into the Widener Athletics Hall of Fame in 2007.
