= 2008 West Texas A&M Buffaloes football team =

American college football season

2008 West Texas A&M Buffaloes football

NCAA Division II Second Round, L 68–93 vs. Abilene Christian
- Conference: Lone Star Conference
- South Division

Ranking
- AFCA: No. 10
- Record: 11–2 (8–1 LSC)
- Head coach: Don Carthel (4th season)
- Offensive coordinator: Scott Parr (3rd season)
- Offensive scheme: Air raid
- Defensive coordinator: Colby Carthel (3rd season)
- Base defense: 3–4
- Home stadium: Kimbrough Memorial Stadium

2008 Lone Star Conference football standings
	Conf.			Overall
Team	W		L	W		L
Overall*
No. 5 Abilene Christian $^	9	–	0	11	–	1
No. 10 West Texas A&M ^	8	–	1	11	–	2
Tarleton State	6	–	3	8	–	3
Texas A&M–Kingsville	6	–	3	7	–	4
Central Oklahoma	6	–	3	7	–	4
SE Oklahoma State	6	–	3	6	–	5
Midwestern State	5	–	4	6	–	4
Texas A&M–Commerce	5	–	4	5	–	5
Angelo State	3	–	6	3	–	8
East Central	2	–	7	3	–	8
SW Oklahoma State	1	–	8	3	–	8
Eastern New Mexico †	1	–	8	2	–	9
Northeastern State	0	–	9	1	–	10
North Division
Central Oklahoma x	5	–	0	7	–	4
SE Oklahoma State	4	–	1	6	–	5
Texas A&M–Commerce	3	–	2	5	–	5
East Central	2	–	3	3	–	8
SW Oklahoma State	1	–	4	3	–	8
Northeastern State	0	–	5	1	–	10
South Division
No. 5 Abilene Christian x$^	6	–	0	11	–	1
No. 10 West Texas A&M ^	5	–	1	11	–	2
Tarleton State	3	–	3	8	–	3
Texas A&M–Kingsville	3	–	3	7	–	4
Midwestern State	3	–	3	6	–	4
Angelo State	1	–	5	3	–	8
Eastern New Mexico †	0	–	6	2	–	9
$ – Conference champion; ^ – NCAA Division II playoff participant; * – The LSC counted separate overall and division standings. † – Eastern New Mexico vacated both wins.; Rankings from AFCA Poll

The 2008 West Texas A&M Buffaloes football team represented West Texas A&M University in the 2008 NCAA Division II football season as a member of the Lone Star Conference (LSC). The Buffaloes were led by fourth-year head coach Don Carthel and played their home games at Kimbrough Memorial Stadium in Canyon, Texas.

The Buffaloes finished the regular season 11–2 overall, going 8–1 in LSC play to finish second in the South Division. The Buffaloes received a bid for the NCAA Division II Playoffs, defeating no. 8 Central Washington in the first round. In the second round, the Buffaloes were defeated 68–93 by LSC foe Abilene Christian, with both teams breaking several conference offensive and scoring records. The two teams finished with a combined 1,531 yards of total offense while the 161 combined points are the most points scored in a single DII game.

== Schedule ==
Date	Time	Opponent	Rank	Site	Result	Attendance
August 28	8:00 p.m.	at Mesa State*	No. 10	Stocker Stadium; Grand Junction, CO	W 23–20	3,822
September 6	6:00 p.m.	at Central Oklahoma	No. 9	Chad Richison Stadium; Edmond, OK	W 49–18	5,223
September 13	6:00 p.m.	Azusa Pacific*	No. 6	Kimbrough Memorial Stadium; Canyon, TX	W 75–13	
September 20	6:00 p.m.	Southwestern Oklahoma State	No. 6	Kimbrough Memorial Stadium; Canyon, TX	W 42–20	
September 27	7:05 p.m.	at Texas A&M–Kingsville	No. 6	Javelina Stadium; Kingsville, TX	W 55–35	
October 4	6:30 p.m.	No. 17 Midwestern State^{†}	No. 5	Kimbrough Memorial Stadium; Canyon, TX	W 42–14	18,739
October 11	7:00 p.m.	at Eastern New Mexico	No. 4	Greyhound Stadium; Portales, NM (Wagon Wheel)	W 51–27	4,132
October 18	6:00 p.m.	No. 3 Abilene Christian	No. 4	Kimbrough Memorial Stadium; Canyon, TX	L 33–52	19,380
October 25	6:00 p.m.	at Angelo State	No. 11	San Angelo Stadium; San Angelo, TX	W 27–0	3,315
November 1	6:00 p.m.	Northeastern State	No. 10	Kimbrough Memorial Stadium; Canyon, TX	W 59–9	
November 8	3:00 p.m.	No. 19 Tarleton State	No. 9	Kimbrough Memorial Stadium; Canyon, TX	W 51–0	
November 15	1:00 p.m.	No. 8 Central Washington*	No. 9	Kimbrough Memorial Stadium; Canyon, TX (NCAA Division II First Round)	W 49–42	
November 22	12:00 p.m.	at No. 2 Abilene Christian*	No. 9	Shotwell Stadium; Abilene, TX (NCAA Division II Second Round)	L 68–93	11,797
*Non-conference game; ^{†}Homecoming; Rankings from AFCA Poll released prior to the game; All times are in Central time

== Rankings ==
Ranking movements Legend: ██ Increase in ranking ██ Decrease in ranking
	Week												
Poll	Pre	1	2	3	4	5	6	7	8	9	10	11	Final
AFCA	10	9	6	6	6	5	4	4	11	10	9	9	10

== Game summaries ==
=== At Mesa State ===
No. 10 West Texas A&M Buffaloes at Mesa State Mavericks – Game summary

Quarter	1	2	3	4	Total
No. 10 Buffaloes	7	6	7	3	23
Mavericks	7	7	6	0	20

at Stocker Stadium, Grand Junction, Colorado

- Date: August 28
- Game time: 8:00 p.m. CDT/7:00 p.m. MDT
- Game weather: Sunny, 94 °F (34 °C)
- Game attendance: 3,822
- Referee: Mike Roussel
- Box score

Game information
First quarter
- MSC – Bobby Coy 2-yard run (Jared Keating kick), 9:01. Mavericks 7–0. Drive: 12 plays, 80 yards, 5:59.
- WTAMU – Keith Flemming 11-yard run (James Chandler kick), 1:41. Tied 7–7. Drive: 7 plays, 85 yards, 2:37.

Second quarter

- WTAMU – Charly Martin 16-yard pass from Keith Null (kick blocked), 5:31. Buffaloes 13–7. Drive: 10 plays, 90 yards, 3:14.
- MSC – Bobby Coy 4-yard run (Jared Keating kick), 1:55. Mavericks 14–13. Drive: 9 plays, 68 yards, 3:29.

Third quarter

- WTAMU – Charly Martin 13-yard pass from Keith Null (James Chandler kick), 14:36. Buffaloes 20–14. Drive: 1 play, 13 yards, 0:01.
- MSC – Maurice Manley 7-yard pass from Phil Vigil (kick blocked), 9:26. Tied 20–20. Drive: 9 plays, 60 yards, 5:10.

Fourth quarter

- WTAMU – James Chandler 24-yard field goal, 3:59. Buffaloes 23–20. Drive: 12 plays, 92 yards, 5:10.

Statistics

Statistics	WTAMU	MSC
First downs	22	21
Total yards	396	373
Rushing yards	64	205
Passing yards	332	168
Turnovers	1	1
Time of possession	25:03	34:57

Team	Category	Player	Statistics
West Texas A&M	Passing	Keith Null	28/44, 332 yards, 2 TD, INT
West Texas A&M	Rushing	Keith Flemming	15 rushes, 52 yards, TD
West Texas A&M	Receiving	Charly Martin	10 receptions, 131 yards, 2 TD
Mesa State	Passing	Phil Vigil	14/24, 168 yards, TD
Mesa State	Rushing	Bobby Coy	34 rushes, 201 yards, 2 TD
Mesa State	Receiving	Maurice Manley	5 receptions, 41 yards, TD

=== At Central Oklahoma ===
No. 9 West Texas A&M Buffaloes at Central Oklahoma Bronchos – Game summary

Quarter	1	2	3	4	Total
No. 9 Buffaloes	7	21	14	7	49
Bronchos	0	3	6	9	18

at Chad Richison Stadium, Edmond, Oklahoma

- Date: September 6
- Game time: 6:00 p.m.
- Game weather: Cloudy, 85 °F (29 °C)
- Game attendance: 5,223
- Referee: Larry Clemens
- Box score

Statistics

Statistics	WTAMU	UCO
First downs		
Total yards		
Rushing yards		
Passing yards		
Turnovers		
Time of possession		

Team	Category	Player	Statistics
West Texas A&M	Passing		
West Texas A&M	Rushing		
West Texas A&M	Receiving		
Central Oklahoma	Passing		
Central Oklahoma	Rushing		
Central Oklahoma	Receiving		

=== No. 17 Midwestern State ===
No. 17 Midwestern State Mustangs at No. 5 West Texas A&M Buffaloes – Game summary

Quarter	1	2	3	4	Total
No. 17 Mustangs	0	14	0	0	14
No. 5 Buffaloes	6	15	14	7	42

at Kimbrough Memorial Stadium, Canyon, Texas

- Date: October 4
- Game time: 6:30 p.m.
- Game weather: Cloudy and rainy, 68 °F (20 °C)
- Game attendance: 18,739
- Referee: Eddy Shelton
- Box score

Statistics

Statistics	MSU	WTAMU
First downs		
Total yards		
Rushing yards		
Passing yards		
Turnovers		
Time of possession		

Team	Category	Player	Statistics
Midwestern State	Passing		
Midwestern State	Rushing		
Midwestern State	Receiving		
West Texas A&M	Passing		
West Texas A&M	Rushing		
West Texas A&M	Receiving		

=== At Eastern New Mexico ===
No. 4 West Texas A&M Buffaloes at Eastern New Mexico Greyhounds – Game summary

Quarter	1	2	3	4	Total
No. 4 Buffaloes	30	7	7	7	51
Greyhounds	0	20	7	0	27

at Greyhound Stadium, Portales, New Mexico

- Date: October 11
- Game time: 7:00 p.m. CDT/6:00 p.m. MDT
- Game weather: Cloudy and rain, 75 °F (24 °C)
- Game attendance: 4,132
- Referee: Bill Keaton
- Box score

Statistics

Statistics	WTAMU	ENMU
First downs		
Total yards		
Rushing yards		
Passing yards		
Turnovers		
Time of possession		

Team	Category	Player	Statistics
West Texas A&M	Passing		
West Texas A&M	Rushing		
West Texas A&M	Receiving		
Eastern New Mexico	Passing		
Eastern New Mexico	Rushing		
Eastern New Mexico	Receiving		

=== At Angelo State ===
No. 11 West Texas A&M Buffaloes at Angelo State Rams – Game summary

Quarter	1	2	3	4	Total
No. 11 Buffaloes	7	7	7	6	27
Rams	0	0	0	0	0

at San Angelo Stadium, San Angelo, Texas

- Date: October 25
- Game time: 6:00 p.m. CDT
- Game attendance: 3,315
- Referee: Eddy Shelton
- Box score

Statistics

Statistics	WTAMU	ASU
First downs		
Total yards		
Rushing yards		
Passing yards		
Turnovers		
Time of possession		

Team	Category	Player	Statistics
West Texas A&M	Passing		
West Texas A&M	Rushing		
West Texas A&M	Receiving		
Angelo State	Passing		
Angelo State	Rushing		
Angelo State	Receiving		

=== No. 8 Central Washington (NCAA Division II First Round) ===
NCAA Division II First Round
No. 8 Central Washington Wildcats at No. 9 West Texas A&M Buffaloes – Game summary

Quarter	1	2	3	4	Total
No. 8 Wildcats	7	14	14	7	42
No. 9 Buffaloes	8	27	14	0	49

at Kimbrough Memorial Stadium, Canyon, TX

- Date: November 15
- Game time: 1:00 p.m. CDT

Statistics

Statistics	CWU	WTAMU
First downs		
Total yards		
Rushing yards		
Passing yards		
Turnovers		
Time of possession		

Team	Category	Player	Statistics
Central Washington	Passing		
Central Washington	Rushing		
Central Washington	Receiving		
West Texas A&M	Passing		
West Texas A&M	Rushing		
West Texas A&M	Receiving		

=== At No. 2 Abilene Christian (NCAA Division II Second Round) ===
NCAA Division II Second Round
No. 9 West Texas A&M Buffaloes at No. 2 Abilene Christian Wildcats – Game summary

Quarter	1	2	3	4	Total
No. 9 Buffaloes	14	20	20	14	68
No. 2 Wildcats	21	21	37	14	93

at Shotwell Stadium, Abilene, Texas

- Date: November 22
- Game time: 12:00 p.m. CST
- Game attendance: 11,797
- Referee: Dwight Neibling
- Box score

Game information
First quarter
- ACU – Edmund Gates 65-yard pass from Billy Malone (Matt Adams kick), 11:43. Wildcats 7–0. Drive: 3 plays, 76 yards, 0:39.
- WTAMU – Carl Johnson 6-yard pass from Keith Null (James Chandler kick), 3:24. Tied 7–7. Drive: 10 plays, 80 yards, 4:45.
- ACU – Edmund Gates 33-yard run (Matt Adams kick), 1:39. Wildcats 14–7. Drive: 5 plays, 69 yards, 1:45.
- WTAMU – Wayne McKnight 85-yard kickoff return (James Chandler kick), 1:25. Tied 14–14.
- ACU – Bernard Scott 19-yard run (Matt Adams kick), 0:45. Wildcats 21–14. Drive: 2 plays, 70 yards, 0:40.

Second quarter

- WTAMU – A. J. Ruffins 11-yard pass from Keith Null (James Chandler kick), 12:12. Tied 21–21. Drive: 11 plays, 70 yards, 3:33.
- ACU – Bernard Scott 54-yard run (Matt Adams kick), 11:46. Wildcats 28–21. Drive: 1 play, 69 yards, 0:26.
- WTAMU – James Chandler 22-yard field goal, 4:30. Wildcats 28–24. Drive: 14 plays, 62 yards, 7:16.
- ACU – Bernard Scott 64-yard run (Matt Adams kick), 3:55. Wildcats 35–24. Drive: 2 plays, 80 yards, 0:35.
- WTAMU – Charly Martin 46-yard pass from Keith Null (James Chandler kick), 2:24. Wildcats 35–31. Drive: 5 plays, 64 yards, 1:31.
- ACU – Jonathan Ferguson 43-yard pass from Billy Malone (Matt Adams kick), 0:59. Wildcats 42–31. Drive: 7 plays, 91 yards, 1:25.
- WTAMU – James Chandler 36-yard field goal, 0:00. Wildcats 42–34. Drive: 9 plays, 43 yards, 0:59.

Third quarter

- ACU – Johnny Knox 27-yard pass from Billy Malone (Zach Stewart run), 10:28. Wildcats 50–34. Drive: 4 plays, 44 yards, 2:00.
- WTAMU – Keith Flemming 19-yard run (pass failed), 7:23. Wildcats 50–40. Drive: 7 plays, 68 yards, 3:05.
- ACU – Bernard Scott 2-yard run (Matt Adams kick), 6:19. Wildcats 57–40. Drive: 4 plays, 36 yards, 1:04.
- WTAMU – Charly Martin 46-yard pass from Keith Null (James Chandler kick), 4:54. Wildcats 57–47. Drive: 5 plays, 67 yards, 1:25.
- ACU – Bernard Scott 39-yard pass from Billy Malone (Matt Adams kick), 4:44. Wildcats 64–47. Drive: 1 play, 39 yards, 0:10.
- ACU – Bernard Scott 44-yard run (Zach Stewart run), 1:14. Wildcats 72–47. Drive: 5 plays, 70 yards, 1:41.
- WTAMU – Charly Martin 64-yard pass from Keith Null (James Chandler kick), 0:34. Wildcats 72–54. Drive: 2 plays, 71 yards, 0:40.
- ACU – Bernard Scott 44-yard run (Matt Adams kick), 0:21. Wildcats 79–54. Drive: 1 play, 39 yards, 0:13.

Fourth quarter

- ACU – Kendrick Holloway 6-yard pass from Billy Malone (Matt Adams kick), 10:13. Wildcats 86–54. Drive: 6 plays, 51 yards, 2:41.
- WTAMU – Charly Martin 1-yard pass from Keith Null (James Chandler kick), 7:55. Wildcats 86–61. Drive: 7 plays, 80 yards, 2:18.
- ACU – Ryan Keeling 10-yard pass from Billy Malone (Matt Adams kick), 4:11. Wildcats 93–61. Drive: 7 plays, 65 yards, 3:44.
- WTAMU – Charly Martin 52-yard pass from Keith Null (James Chandler kick), 0:03. Wildcats 93–68. Drive: 7 plays, 82 yards, 4:08.

Statistics

Statistics	WTAMU	ACU
First downs	34	30
Total yards	721	810
Rushing yards	126	427
Passing yards	595	383
Turnovers	1	0
Time of possession	36:48	23:12

Team	Category	Player	Statistics
West Texas A&M	Passing	Keith Null	42/63, 595 yards, 7 TD
West Texas A&M	Rushing	Keith Flemming	21 rushes, 105 yards, TD
West Texas A&M	Receiving	Charly Martin	14 receptions, 323 yards, 5 TD
Abilene Christian	Passing	Billy Malone	16/25, 383 yards, 6 TD
Abilene Christian	Rushing	Bernard Scott	19 rushes, 292 yards, 6 TD
Abilene Christian	Receiving	Johnny Knox	5 receptions, 125 yards, TD
