= Abilene Christian Wildcats football =

Intercollegiate American football team

2026 Abilene Christian Wildcats football team
- First season: 1919; 107 years ago
- Athletic director: Zack Lassiter
- Head coach: Keith Patterson; 5th season, 29–19 (.604)
- Location: Abilene, Texas
- Stadium: Anthony Field at Wildcat Stadium (capacity: 12,000)
- NCAA division: Division I FCS
- Conference: UAC
- Colors: Purple and white
- All-time record: 549–464–14 (.541)

NAIA national championships
- NAIA Division I: 1973, 1977

Conference championships
- TCAC: 1939, 1940, 1946, 1950, 1951, 1952, 1953 GCC: 1955 LSC: 1973, 1977, 2008, 2010 WAC: 2022 UAC: 2024, 2025

Division championships
- LSC South: 2002, 2008, 2010
- Outfitter: Under Armour
- Website: ACUSports.com

The Abilene Christian Wildcats football program is the intercollegiate American football team for the Abilene Christian University located in the U.S. state of Texas. The team was a member of the Southland Conference through the 2020–21 season, but joined the Western Athletic Conference in July 2021, coinciding with that league's reinstatement of football as an official conference sport. After the 2022 season, the WAC fully merged its football league with that of the Atlantic Sun Conference, creating what eventually became the United Athletic Conference, and ACU accordingly moved its football team to the new league. In July 2026, the football-only UAC was merged into the WAC, which adopted the United Athletic Conference name with Abilene Christian as a continuing member. The school's first football team was fielded in 1919. The team plays its home games at the on-campus Anthony Field at Wildcat Stadium.

== History ==
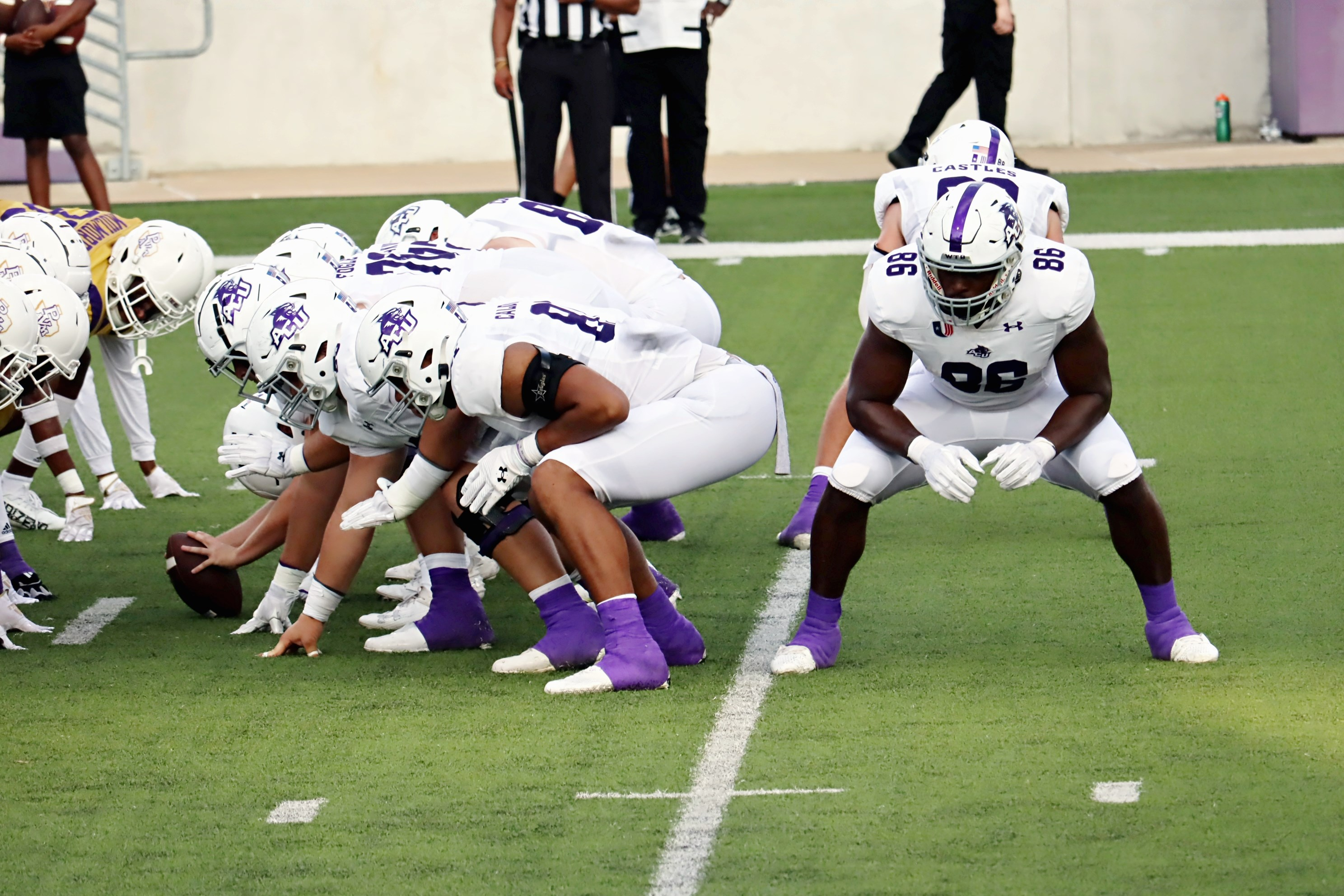
The Wildcats offensive line lines up for a field goal during a 2023 game

=== Football classifications ===
- 1951–1972: College Division (small school)
- 1973–1982: NAIA Division I
- 1982–2012: NCAA Division II
- 2013–present: NCAA Division I Football Championship Subdivision

• Abilene Christian did not field a team in 1943–1945.

=== Conference affiliations ===
- 1919–1924: Independent
- 1925–1932: Texas Intercollegiate Athletic Association
- 1931–1932: Independent
- 1933–1942, 1946–1953: Texas Conference
  - No team 1943–1945 due to World War II
- 1954: Independent
- 1955–1956: Gulf Coast Conference
- 1957–1963: Independent
- 1964–1972: Southland Conference
- 1973–2012: Lone Star Conference
- 2013: NCAA Division I FCS independent
- 2014–2020: Southland Conference
- 2021–2022: Western Athletic Conference
- 2023–2025: United Athletic Conference (football-only)
- 2026–present: United Athletic Conference (all-sports)

=== Head coaching history ===
Name	Seasons	Record	Pct
Vernon McCasland	1919	2–2	.500
Sewell Jones	1920	4–0–1	.900
Russell A. Lewis	1921	2–5	.286
Victor Payne	1922–1923	12–3	.800
A. B. Morris	1924–1941	66–77–18	.466
Tonto Coleman	1942–1949	28–15–2	.644
Garvin Beauchamp	1950–1955	39–18–4	.672
N. L. Nicholson	1956–1961	28–30–1	.483
Les Wheeler	1962–1967	29–28	.509
Wally Bullington	1968–1976	62–32–2	.656
DeWitt Jones	1977–1978	18–4–1	.804
Ted Sitton	1979–1984	34–27–1	.556
John Payne	1985–1990	26–34–1	.435
Ronnie Peacock	1991–1992	4–15	.211
Bob Strader	1993–1995	14–17	.452
Jack Kiser	1996–1999	22–19	.537
Gary Gaines	2000–2004	21–30	.412
Chris Thomsen	2005–2011	61–21	.744
Ken Collums	2012–2016	24–32	.429
Adam Dorrel	2017–2021	19–32	.373
Keith Patterson	2022–present	29–19	.604

== Notable former players ==
Notable alumni include:

- Charcandrick West
- Mitchell Gale
- Grant Feasel
- James Hill
- Ove Johansson
- Johnny Knox
- Clint Longley
- Danieal Manning
- Reggie McGowan
- Wilbert Montgomery
- Cleo Montgomery
- Johnny Perkins
- Bernard Scott
- Major Culbert
- Taylor Gabriel
- Clyde Gates
- Bob Oliver
- Daryl Richardson
- John Layfield
- Bernie Erickson
- Wayne Walton

== Championships ==
=== National championships ===
Season	Coach	Selectors	Record	Bowl
1973	Wally Bullington	NAIA Playoffs	11–1	Won NAIA Championship
1977	DeWitt Jones	NAIA Playoffs	11–1–1	Won NAIA Championship
National Championships			2	

=== Conference championships ===
Year	Coach	Conference	Overall record	Conference record
1939†	A.B. Morris	Texas Collegiate Athletic Conference	6–2–1	5–1
1940†	A.B. Morris	Texas Collegiate Athletic Conference	7–2	5–1
1946†	Tonto Coleman	Texas Collegiate Athletic Conference	8–1–1	5–0–1
1950	Garvin Beauchamp	Texas Collegiate Athletic Conference	11–0	5–0
1951†	Garvin Beauchamp	Texas Collegiate Athletic Conference	6–4	3–1
1952	Garvin Beauchamp	Texas Collegiate Athletic Conference	6–3–1	4–0
1953†	Garvin Beauchamp	Texas Collegiate Athletic Conference	7–3	3–1
1955†	Garvin Beauchamp	Gulf Coast Conference	3–5–2	2–1
1973	Wally Bullington	Lone Star Conference	11–1	9–0
1977†	DeWitt Jones	Lone Star Conference	11–1–1	5–1–1
2008	Chris Thomsen	Lone Star Conference	11–1	9–0
2010	Chris Thomsen	Lone Star Conference	11–1	10–0
2022†	Keith Patterson	Western Athletic Conference	7–4	3–1
2024	Keith Patterson	United Athletic Conference	8–4	7–1
2025†	Keith Patterson	United Athletic Conference		7–1
Conference Championships			15	

† Co-champions

=== Division championships ===
Year	Coach	Division championship	Overall record	Conference record	Division record
2002†	Gary Gaines	LSC South	6–4	6–2	5–1
2008	Chris Thomsen	LSC South	11–1	9–0	6–0
2010	Chris Thomsen	LSC South	11–1	10–0	8–0
Division Championships			3		

† Co-champions

== Bowl games ==
Date	Bowl	Coach	Opponent	Result
December 2, 1950	Refrigerator Bowl	Garvin Beauchamp	Gustavus Adolphus College	W 14–7
December 4, 1976	San Jancinto Shrine Bowl	Wally Bullington	Harding	W 22–12

== Playoff appearances ==
=== NCAA Division I FCS ===
The Wildcats have made two appearances in the NCAA Division I FCS playoffs. They have a combined record of 2–2.

Year	Round	Opponent	Result
2024	First Round; Second Round	Northern Arizona; North Dakota State	W 24–0; L 31–51
2025	First Round; Second Round	Lamar; Stephen F. Austin	W 38–20; L 34–41

=== NCAA Division II ===
The Wildcats have made six appearances in the Division II playoffs, with an combined record of 3–6.

Year	Round	Opponent	Result
2006	First Round	West Texas A&M	L 27–30 ^{OT}
2007	First Round; Second Round	Mesa State; Chadron State	W 56–12; L 73–76 ^{3OT}
2008	Second Round; Quarterfinals	West Texas A&M; Northwest Missouri State	W 93–68; L 36–45
2009	First Round; Second Round	Midwestern State; Northwest Missouri State	W 24–21; L 10–35
2010	Second Round	Central Missouri	L 41–55
2011	First Round	Washburn	L 49–52

=== NAIA ===
The Wildcats made two appearances in the NAIA playoffs with an overall record of 4–0. They were National Champions in 1973 and 1977.

Year	Round	Opponent	Result
1973	Semifinals; National Championship Game	Langston; Elon	W 34–6; W 42–14
1977	Semifinals; National Championship Game	Wisconsin–Stevens Point; Southwestern Oklahoma State	W 35–7; W 24–7

== Future non-conference opponents ==
Announced schedules as of October 29, 2026.

2027	2028	2029	2030	2031
Lamar	at South Dakota	South Dakota	at Lamar	Lamar
at UTSA	at Texas A&M			
at Stephen F. Austin				

== See also ==
- List of NCAA Division I FCS football stadiums
