= Kokolo =

- Location in Burkina Faso
- Coordinates: 12°39′N 2°12′W
- Country: Burkina Faso
- Region: Centre-Ouest Region
- Province: Boulkiemdé Province
- Department: Nanoro Department

Population (2019)
  - Total: 1,633
- Time zone: UTC+0 (GMT 0)

Kokolo is a town in the Nanoro Department of Boulkiemdé Province in central western Burkina Faso.

Population
Year	Pop.	±%
2006	1,200	—
2019	1,633	+36.1%
