= Soala =

- Location in Burkina Faso
- Coordinates: 12°39′N 1°57′W
- Country: Burkina Faso
- Region: Centre-Ouest Region
- Province: Boulkiemdé Province
- Department: Nanoro Department

Population (2019)
  - Total: 2,647
- Time zone: UTC+0 (GMT 0)

Soala is a town in the Nanoro Department of Boulkiemdé Province in central western Burkina Faso.

Population
Year	Pop.	±%
1985	1,886	—
2006	2,242	+18.9%
2019	2,647	+18.1%
