= Poéssi =

- Location in Burkina Faso
- Coordinates: 12°41′N 2°8′W
- Country: Burkina Faso
- Region: Centre-Ouest Region
- Province: Boulkiemdé Province
- Department: Nanoro Department

Population (2019)
  - Total: 3,441
- Time zone: UTC+0 (GMT 0)

Poéssi is a town in the Nanoro Department of Boulkiemdé Province in central western Burkina Faso.

Population
Year	Pop.	±%
1985	2,856	—
2006	2,476	−13.3%
2019	3,441	+39.0%
