= Goulouré, Nanoro =

Goulouré
- Location in Burkina Faso
- Coordinates: 12.6530°N 2.2359°W
- Country: Burkina Faso
- Region: Centre-Ouest Region
- Province: Boulkiemdé Province
- Department: Nanoro Department

Population (2019)
  - Total: 2,273
- Time zone: UTC+0 (GMT 0)

Goulouré, Nanoro is a town in the Nanoro Department of Boulkiemdé Province in central western Burkina Faso.

Population
Year	Pop.	±%
1985	833	—
2006	979	+17.5%
2019	2,273	+132.2%
