= 1977 Abilene Christian Wildcats football team =

American college football season

1977 Abilene Christian Wildcats football

NAIA Division I national champion LSC co-champion

Champion Bowl, W 24–7 vs. Southwestern Oklahoma State
- Conference: Lone Star Conference
- Record: 11–1–1 (5–1–1 LSC)
- Head coach: DeWitt Jones (1st season)
- MVPs: Ray Nunez; Kelly Kent
- Captains: Cleo Montgomery; John Mayes; Ray Nunez; John Usrey; Chuck Sitton
- Home stadium: Shotwell Stadium

1977 Lone Star Conference football standings
	Conf.					Overall
Team	W		L		T	W		L		T
No. 2 Abilene Christian +^	5	–	1	–	1	11	–	1	–	1
No. 3 Texas A&I +	5	–	1	–	1	8	–	1	–	1
No. 11 Angelo State	5	–	2	–	0	8	–	2	–	0
No. 15 Southwest Texas State	5	–	2	–	0	5	–	4	–	0
No. 13 East Texas State	4	–	3	–	0	7	–	4	–	0
Stephen F. Austin	2	–	5	–	0	2	–	8	–	0
Sam Houston State	1	–	6	–	0	1	–	10	–	0
Howard Payne	0	–	7	–	0	2	–	8	–	0
$ – Conference champion; ^ – NAIA Division I playoff participant; Rankings from NAIA Division I poll

The 1977 Abilene Christian Wildcats football team was an American football team that represented Abilene Christian University (ACU) as a member of the Lone Star Conference (LSC) during the 1977 NAIA Division I football season. In their first season under head coach DeWitt Jones, the Wildcats compiled an 11–1–1 record (5–1–1 against conference opponents) and tied for the LSC championship. They advanced to the NAIA playoff, defeating Wisconsin–Stevens Point (35–7) in the seminfinals and Southwestern Oklahoma State (24–7) in the Champion Bowl to win the 1977 NAIA Division I football national championship.

Wide receiver Cleotha Montgomery and tight end Kirby Jones received first-team honors on the 1977 All-Lone Star Conference football team. Quarterback John Mayes and four defensive players were chosen for the second team. Other key players included Kelly Kent who rushed for over 1,000 yards.

The team played its home games at Shotwell Stadium in Abilene, Texas.

== Schedule ==
Date	Opponent	Site	Result	Attendance	Source
September 3	Northwestern Oklahoma State*	Shotwell Stadium; Abilene, TX	W 34–14	7,000	
September 10	at Northern Colorado*	Greeley, CO	W 24–3		
September 17	Western New Mexico*	Shotwell Stadium; Abilene, TX	W 46–13	7,000	
September 24	Cameron*	Shotwell Stadium; Abilene, TX	W 21–14		
October 8	at Texas A&I	Javelina Stadium; Kingsville, TX	T 25–25		
October 15	Angelo State	Shotwell Stadium; Abilene, TX	L 14–21		
October 22	at East Texas State	Commerce, TX	W 28–13		
October 29	Stephen F. Austin	Shotwell Stadium; Abilene, TX	W 35–21	7,500	
November 5	at Sam Houston State	Pritchett Field; Huntsville, TX	W 41–18		
November 12	Southwest Texas State	Shotwell Stadium; Abilene, TX	W 36–30	7,000	
November 19	at Howard Payne	Brownwood, TX	W 42–24		
December 3	Wisconsin–Stevens Point*	Shotwell Stadium; Abilene, TX (NAIA Division I semifinal)	W 35–7	8,500	
December 10	vs. Southwestern Oklahoma State*	Kingdome; Seattle, WA (Champion Bowl)	W 24–7	12,940	
*Non-conference game
