= 1977 Wisconsin–Stevens Point Pointers football team =

American college football season

1977 Wisconsin–Stevens Point Pointers football

WSUC champion

NAIA Division I Semifinal, L 7–35 at Abilene Christian
- Conference: Wisconsin State University Conference
- Record: 8–2–1 (7–0–1 WSUC)
- Head coach: Ron Steiner (1st season)
- Home stadium: Goerke Field

1977 Wisconsin State University Conference football standings
	Conf.					Overall
Team	W		L		T	W		L		T
No. 6 Wisconsin–Stevens Point $^	7	–	0	–	1	8	–	2	–	1
Wisconsin–Whitewater	6	–	2	–	0	7	–	4	–	0
Wisconsin–La Crosse	5	–	2	–	1	6	–	2	–	2
Wisconsin–Platteville	5	–	3	–	0	7	–	3	–	0
Wisconsin–Oshkosh	3	–	5	–	0	5	–	5	–	0
Wisconsin–Eau Claire	3	–	5	–	0	5	–	6	–	0
Wisconsin–River Falls	3	–	5	–	0	4	–	6	–	0
Wisconsin–Stout	2	–	6	–	0	2	–	8	–	0
Wisconsin–Superior	1	–	7	–	0	1	–	9	–	0
$ – Conference champion; ^ – NAIA Division I playoff participant; Rankings from NAIA Division I poll

The 1977 Wisconsin–Stevens Point Pointers football team was an American football team that represented the University of Wisconsin–Stevens Point as a member of the Wisconsin State University Conference (WSUC) during the 1977 NAIA Division I football season. Led by first-year head coach Ron Steiner, the Pointers compiled an overall record of 8–2–1 with a mark of 7–0–1 in conference play, winning the WSUC title. Wisconsin–Stevens Point advanced to the NAIA Division I Football National Championship playoffs, where the Pointers lost in the semifinals to the eventual national champion, Abilene Christian.

== Schedule ==
Date	Opponent	Site	Result	Attendance	Source
September 10	Wayne State (MI)*	Goerke Field; Stevens Point, WI	L 21–28	1,520	
September 17	at Wisconsin–Platteville	Ralph E. Davis Pioneer Stadium; Platteville, WI	W 28–10		
September 24	at St. Norbert*	De Pere, WI	W 45–8		
October 1	at Wisconsin–La Crosse	Veterans Memorial Stadium; La Crosse, WI	T 7–7		
October 8	Wisconsin–Stout	Goerke Field; Stevens Point, WI	W 36–0		
October 15	at Wisconsin–Oshkosh	Titan Stadium; Oshkosh, WI	W 31–26		
October 22	Wisconsin–Whitewater	Goerke Field; Stevens Point, WI	W 41–3		
October 29	Wisconsin–River Falls	Goerke Field; Stevens Point, WI	W 29–28		
November 5	at Wisconsin–Superior	Superior, WI	W 33–10		
November 12	Wisconsin–Eau Claire	Goerke Field; Stevens Point, WI	W 39–14		
December 3	at Abilene Christian*	Shotwell Stadium; Abilene, TX (NAIA Division I Semifinal)	L 7–35	8,500	
*Non-conference game

== Roster ==
1977 Wisconsin–Stevens Point Pointers football team roster
Players			Coaches
Offense: Pos. / # / Name / Class; QB, P / 16 / Rick Post / Sr	Defense: Pos. / # / Name / Class	Special teams: Pos. / # / Name / Class	Head coach: John Pont; Coordinators/assistant coaches Legend: (C) Team captain; (S) Suspended; (I) Ineligible; Injured; Redshirt
