= 1977 Southwest Texas State Bobcats football team =

American college football season

1977 Southwest Texas State Bobcats football
- Conference: Lone Star Conference
- Record: 5–4 (5–2 LSC)
- Head coach: Bill Miller (13th season)
- Defensive coordinator: Bob Brush (1st season)
- Home stadium: Evans Field

1977 Lone Star Conference football standings
	Conf.					Overall
Team	W		L		T	W		L		T
No. 2 Abilene Christian +^	5	–	1	–	1	11	–	1	–	1
No. 3 Texas A&I +	5	–	1	–	1	8	–	1	–	1
No. 11 Angelo State	5	–	2	–	0	8	–	2	–	0
No. 15 Southwest Texas State	5	–	2	–	0	5	–	4	–	0
No. 13 East Texas State	4	–	3	–	0	7	–	4	–	0
Stephen F. Austin	2	–	5	–	0	2	–	8	–	0
Sam Houston State	1	–	6	–	0	1	–	10	–	0
Howard Payne	0	–	7	–	0	2	–	8	–	0
$ – Conference champion; ^ – NAIA Division I playoff participant; Rankings from NAIA Division I poll

The 1977 Southwest Texas State Bobcats football team was an American football team that represented Southwest Texas State University (now known as Texas State University) during the 1977 NAIA Division I football season as a member of the Lone Star Conference (LSC). In their 13th year under head coach Bill Miller, the team compiled an overall record of 5–4, with a mark of 5–2 in conference play.

== Schedule ==
Date	Opponent	Site	Result	Source
September 10	at Texas Lutheran*	Matador Field; Seguin, TX	L 13–21	
September 17	Cameron State*	Evans Field; San Marcos, TX	Cancelled	
October 1	at Howard Payne	Cen-Tex Stadium; Brownwood, TX	W 21–13	
October 8	Prairie View A&M*	Evans Field; San Marcos, TX	L 7–17	
October 15	Sam Houston State	Evans Field; San Marcos, TX (rivalry)	W 16–5	
October 22	at Stephen F. Austin	Lumberjack Stadium; Nacogdoches, TX	W 14–9	
October 29	East Texas State	Evans Field; San Marcos, TX	W 34–20	
November 5	at Angelo State	San Angelo Stadium; San Angelo, TX	W 23–20	
November 12	at Abilene Christian	Shotwell Stadium; Abilene, TX	L 30–36	
November 19	Texas A&I	Evans Field; San Marcos, TX	L 10–21	
*Non-conference game
