= Nazoanga =

- Location in Burkina Faso
- Coordinates: 12°38′N 2°8′W
- Country: Burkina Faso
- Region: Centre-Ouest Region
- Province: Boulkiemdé Province
- Department: Nanoro Department

Population (2019)
  - Total: 5,867
- Time zone: UTC+0 (GMT 0)

Nazoanga is a town in the Nanoro Department of Boulkiemdé Province in central western Burkina Faso.

Population
Year	Pop.	±%
1985	3,267	—
2006	4,173	+27.7%
2019	5,867	+40.6%
