= Boulpon =

- Location in Burkina Faso
- Coordinates: 12°39′N 2°4′W
- Country: Burkina Faso
- Region: Centre-Ouest Region
- Province: Boulkiemdé Province
- Department: Nanoro Department

Population (2019)
  - Total: 4,389
- Time zone: UTC+0 (GMT 0)

Boulpon is a town in the Nanoro Department of Boulkiemdé Province in central western Burkina Faso.

Population
Year	Pop.	±%
1985	2,608	—
2006	3,680	+41.1%
2019	4,389	+19.3%
