= 2008 Abilene Christian Wildcats football team =

American college football season

2008 Abilene Christian Wildcats football

LSC champion LSC South Division champion

NCAA Division II Quarterfinal, L 36–45 vs. Northwest Missouri State
- Conference: Lone Star Conference
- South Division

Ranking
- AFCA: No. 5
- Record: 11–1 (9–0 LSC)
- Head coach: Chris Thomsen (4th season)
- Offensive coordinator: Ken Collums (4th season)
- Offensive scheme: Spread
- Defensive coordinator: Jason Johns (3rd season)
- Base defense: 3–4
- Home stadium: Shotwell Stadium

2008 Lone Star Conference football standings
	Conf.			Overall
Team	W		L	W		L
Overall*
No. 5 Abilene Christian $^	9	–	0	11	–	1
No. 10 West Texas A&M ^	8	–	1	11	–	2
Tarleton State	6	–	3	8	–	3
Texas A&M–Kingsville	6	–	3	7	–	4
Central Oklahoma	6	–	3	7	–	4
SE Oklahoma State	6	–	3	6	–	5
Midwestern State	5	–	4	6	–	4
Texas A&M–Commerce	5	–	4	5	–	5
Angelo State	3	–	6	3	–	8
East Central	2	–	7	3	–	8
SW Oklahoma State	1	–	8	3	–	8
Eastern New Mexico †	1	–	8	2	–	9
Northeastern State	0	–	9	1	–	10
North Division
Central Oklahoma x	5	–	0	7	–	4
SE Oklahoma State	4	–	1	6	–	5
Texas A&M–Commerce	3	–	2	5	–	5
East Central	2	–	3	3	–	8
SW Oklahoma State	1	–	4	3	–	8
Northeastern State	0	–	5	1	–	10
South Division
No. 5 Abilene Christian x$^	6	–	0	11	–	1
No. 10 West Texas A&M ^	5	–	1	11	–	2
Tarleton State	3	–	3	8	–	3
Texas A&M–Kingsville	3	–	3	7	–	4
Midwestern State	3	–	3	6	–	4
Angelo State	1	–	5	3	–	8
Eastern New Mexico †	0	–	6	2	–	9
$ – Conference champion; ^ – NCAA Division II playoff participant; * – The LSC counted separate overall and division standings. † – Eastern New Mexico vacated both wins.; Rankings from AFCA Poll

The 2008 Abilene Christian Wildcats football team was an American football team that represented Abilene Christian University (ACU) as a member of the South Division of the Lone Star Conference (LSC) during the 2008 NCAA Division II football season. In their fourth season under head coach Chris Thomsen, the Wildcats compiled an overall record of 11–1 record with a mark of 9–0 in conference play, winning the LSC and LSC South Division titles. Abilene Christian advanced to the NCAA Division II Football Championship playoffs, where, after a first-round bye, the Wildcats defeated West Texas A&M, 93–68, in the second round, before losing to Northwest Missouri State in the quarterfinals, 45–36. The team played its home games at Shotwell Stadium in Abilene, Texas.

== Schedule ==
Date	Time	Opponent	Rank	Site	Result	Attendance
August 30	6:00 p.m.	at No. 3 Northwest Missouri State*	No. 8	Bearcat Stadium; Maryville, MO	W 44–27	6,841
September 13	2:00 p.m.	Texas A&M–Commerce*	No. 4	Shotwell Stadium; Abilene, TX	W 45–14	7,217
September 20	6:00 p.m.	at Southeastern Oklahoma State*	No. 4	Paul Laird Field; Durant, OK	W 59–10	3,268
September 27	7:00 p.m.	at Eastern New Mexico	No. 4	Greyhound Stadium; Portales, NM	W 56–11	3,524
October 4	6:00 p.m.	East Central*	No. 4	Shotwell Stadium; Abilene, TX	W 66–7	7,677
October 11	7:00 p.m.	Angelo State	No. 3	Shotwell Stadium; Abilene, TX	W 51–7	8,145
October 18	6:00 p.m.	at No. 4 West Texas A&M	No. 3	Buffalo Stadium; Canyon, TX	W 52–35	19,380
October 25	2:00 p.m.	No. 16 Tarleton State	No. 2	Shotwell Stadium; Abilene, TX	W 37–17	10,585
November 1	7:00 p.m.	at Texas A&M–Kingsville	No. 2	Javelina Stadium; Kinsgville, TX	W 42–17	5,817
November 8	2:00 p.m.	Midwestern State	No. 2	Shotwell Stadium; Abilene, TX	W 47–17	7,337
November 22	12:00 p.m.	No. 9 West Texas A&M*	No. 2	Shotwell Stadium; Abilene, TX (NCAA Division II Second Round)	W 93–68	11,797
November 29	12:00 p.m.	No. 3 Northwest Missouri State*	No. 2	Shotwell Stadium; Abilene, TX (NCAA Division II Quarterfinal)	L 36–45	8,817
*Non-conference game; Rankings from AFCA Poll released prior to the game; All times are in Central time

== Game summaries ==
=== No. 9 West Texas A&M (NCAA Division II Second Round) ===
NCAA Division II Second Round
No. 9 West Texas A&M Buffaloes at No. 2 Abilene Christian Wildcats – Game summary

Quarter	1	2	3	4	Total
No. 9 Buffaloes	14	20	20	14	68
No. 2 Wildcats	21	21	37	14	93

at Shotwell Stadium, Abilene, Texas

- Date: November 22
- Game time: 12:00 p.m. CST
- Game attendance: 11,797
- Referee: Dwight Neibling
- Box score

Game information
First quarter
- ACU – Edmund Gates 65-yard pass from Billy Malone (Matt Adams kick), 11:43. Wildcats 7–0. Drive: 3 plays, 76 yards, 0:39.
- WTAMU – Carl Johnson 6-yard pass from Keith Null (James Chandler kick), 3:24. Tied 7–7. Drive: 10 plays, 80 yards, 4:45.
- ACU – Edmund Gates 33-yard run (Matt Adams kick), 1:39. Wildcats 14–7. Drive: 5 plays, 69 yards, 1:45.
- WTAMU – Wayne McKnight 85-yard kickoff return (James Chandler kick), 1:25. Tied 14–14.
- ACU – Bernard Scott 19-yard run (Matt Adams kick), 0:45. Wildcats 21–14. Drive: 2 plays, 70 yards, 0:40.

Second quarter

- WTAMU – A. J. Ruffins 11-yard pass from Keith Null (James Chandler kick), 12:12. Tied 21–21. Drive: 11 plays, 70 yards, 3:33.
- ACU – Bernard Scott 54-yard run (Matt Adams kick), 11:46. Wildcats 28–21. Drive: 1 play, 69 yards, 0:26.
- WTAMU – James Chandler 22-yard field goal, 4:30. Wildcats 28–24. Drive: 14 plays, 62 yards, 7:16.
- ACU – Bernard Scott 64-yard run (Matt Adams kick), 3:55. Wildcats 35–24. Drive: 2 plays, 80 yards, 0:35.
- WTAMU – Charly Martin 46-yard pass from Keith Null (James Chandler kick), 2:24. Wildcats 35–31. Drive: 5 plays, 64 yards, 1:31.
- ACU – Jonathan Ferguson 43-yard pass from Billy Malone (Matt Adams kick), 0:59. Wildcats 42–31. Drive: 7 plays, 91 yards, 1:25.
- WTAMU – James Chandler 36-yard field goal, 0:00. Wildcats 42–34. Drive: 9 plays, 43 yards, 0:59.

Third quarter

- ACU – Johnny Knox 27-yard pass from Billy Malone (Zach Stewart run), 10:28. Wildcats 50–34. Drive: 4 plays, 44 yards, 2:00.
- WTAMU – Keith Flemming 19-yard run (pass failed), 7:23. Wildcats 50–40. Drive: 7 plays, 68 yards, 3:05.
- ACU – Bernard Scott 2-yard run (Matt Adams kick), 6:19. Wildcats 57–40. Drive: 4 plays, 36 yards, 1:04.
- WTAMU – Charly Martin 46-yard pass from Keith Null (James Chandler kick), 4:54. Wildcats 57–47. Drive: 5 plays, 67 yards, 1:25.
- ACU – Bernard Scott 39-yard pass from Billy Malone (Matt Adams kick), 4:44. Wildcats 64–47. Drive: 1 play, 39 yards, 0:10.
- ACU – Bernard Scott 44-yard run (Zach Stewart run), 1:14. Wildcats 72–47. Drive: 5 plays, 70 yards, 1:41.
- WTAMU – Charly Martin 64-yard pass from Keith Null (James Chandler kick), 0:34. Wildcats 72–54. Drive: 2 plays, 71 yards, 0:40.
- ACU – Bernard Scott 44-yard run (Matt Adams kick), 0:21. Wildcats 79–54. Drive: 1 play, 39 yards, 0:13.

Fourth quarter

- ACU – Kendrick Holloway 6-yard pass from Billy Malone (Matt Adams kick), 10:13. Wildcats 86–54. Drive: 6 plays, 51 yards, 2:41.
- WTAMU – Charly Martin 1-yard pass from Keith Null (James Chandler kick), 7:55. Wildcats 86–61. Drive: 7 plays, 80 yards, 2:18.
- ACU – Ryan Keeling 10-yard pass from Billy Malone (Matt Adams kick), 4:11. Wildcats 93–61. Drive: 7 plays, 65 yards, 3:44.
- WTAMU – Charly Martin 52-yard pass from Keith Null (James Chandler kick), 0:03. Wildcats 93–68. Drive: 7 plays, 82 yards, 4:08.

Statistics	WTAMU	ACU
First downs	34	30
Total yards	721	810
Rushing yards	126	427
Passing yards	595	383
Turnovers	1	0
Time of possession	36:48	23:12

Team	Category	Player	Statistics
West Texas A&M	Passing	Keith Null	42/63, 595 yards, 7 TD
West Texas A&M	Rushing	Keith Flemming	21 rushes, 105 yards, TD
West Texas A&M	Receiving	Charly Martin	14 receptions, 323 yards, 5 TD
Abilene Christian	Passing	Billy Malone	16/25, 383 yards, 6 TD
Abilene Christian	Rushing	Bernard Scott	19 rushes, 292 yards, 6 TD
Abilene Christian	Receiving	Johnny Knox	5 receptions, 125 yards, TD

The Buffaloes and Wildcats finished with a combined 1,531 yards of total offense. Both teams broke several Lone Star Conference offensive and scoring records during the game along with the NCAA Division II record for total points scored in a game at 161.
