= Basziri, Nanoro =

Basziri
- Location in Burkina Faso
- Coordinates: 12°39′N 2°13′W
- Country: Burkina Faso
- Region: Centre-Ouest Region
- Province: Boulkiemdé Province
- Department: Nanoro Department

Population (2019)
  - Total: 1,813
- Time zone: UTC+0 (GMT 0)

Basziri is a village in the Nanoro Department of Boulkiemdé Province in central western Burkina Faso.

Population
Year	Pop.	±%
1985	1,380	—
2006	621	−55.0%
2019	1,813	+191.9%
