= 1977 Wisconsin–Whitewater Warhawks football team =

American college football season

1977 Wisconsin–Whitewater Warhawks football
- Conference: Wisconsin State University Conference
- Record: 7–4 (6–2 WSUC)
- Head coach: Forrest Perkins (21st season)
- Home stadium: Warhawks Stadium

1977 Wisconsin State University Conference football standings
	Conf.					Overall
Team	W		L		T	W		L		T
No. 6 Wisconsin–Stevens Point $^	7	–	0	–	1	8	–	2	–	1
Wisconsin–Whitewater	6	–	2	–	0	7	–	4	–	0
Wisconsin–La Crosse	5	–	2	–	1	6	–	2	–	2
Wisconsin–Platteville	5	–	3	–	0	7	–	3	–	0
Wisconsin–Oshkosh	3	–	5	–	0	5	–	5	–	0
Wisconsin–Eau Claire	3	–	5	–	0	5	–	6	–	0
Wisconsin–River Falls	3	–	5	–	0	4	–	6	–	0
Wisconsin–Stout	2	–	6	–	0	2	–	8	–	0
Wisconsin–Superior	1	–	7	–	0	1	–	9	–	0
$ – Conference champion; ^ – NAIA Division I playoff participant; Rankings from NAIA Division I poll

The 1977 Wisconsin–Whitewater Warhawks football team was an American football team that represented the University of Wisconsin–Whitewater as a member of the Wisconsin State University Conference (WSUC) during the 1977 NAIA Division I football season. Led by 21st-year head coach Forrest Perkins, the Warhawks compiled an overall record of 7–4 and a mark of 6–2 in conference play, placing second in the WSUC.

== Schedule ==
Date	Opponent	Site	Result
September 3	St. Norbert*	Warhawks Stadium; Whitewater, WI	W 41–0
September 10	at Mankato State*	Blakeslee Stadium; Mankato, MN	L 14–24
September 17	at Wisconsin–La Crosse	Veterans Memorial Stadium; La Crosse, WI	W 14–6
September 24	Wisconsin–Stout	Warhawks Stadium; Whitewater, WI	W 30–0
October 1	Wisconsin–Platteville	Warhawks Stadium; Whitewater, WI	W 16–0
October 8	at Wisconsin–Superior	Superior, WI	W 35–20
October 15	Northern Michigan*	Warhawks Stadium; Whitewater, WI	L 14–38
October 22	at Wisconsin–Stevens Point	Goerke Field; Stevens Point, WI	L 3–41
October 29	Wisconsin–Eau Claire	Warhawks Stadium; Whitewater, WI	W 13–7
November 5	at Wisconsin–River Falls	River Falls, WI	L 21–37
November 12	Wisconsin–Oshkosh	Warhawks Stadium; Whitewater, WI	W 19–10
*Non-conference game
