= Nanoro =

- Location in Burkina Faso
- Coordinates: 12°41′N 2°12′W
- Country: Burkina Faso
- Region: Centre-Ouest Region
- Province: Boulkiemdé Province
- Department: Nanoro Department

Population (2019)
  - Total: 10,847
- Time zone: UTC+0 (GMT 0)

Nanoro is the capital of the Nanoro Department of Boulkiemdé Province in central western Burkina Faso.

Population
Year	Pop.	±%
2006	6,634	—
2019	10,847	+63.5%
