= Séguédin, Nanoro =

Séguédin
- Location in Burkina Faso
- Coordinates: 12°41′N 2°1′W
- Country: Burkina Faso
- Region: Centre-Ouest Region
- Province: Boulkiemdé Province
- Department: Nanoro Department

Population (2019)
  - Total: 4,483
- Time zone: UTC+0 (GMT 0)

Séguédin is a town in the Nanoro Department of Boulkiemdé Province in central western Burkina Faso.

Population
Year	Pop.	±%
1985	2,669	—
2006	3,547	+32.9%
2019	4,483	+26.4%
