= Godo, Nanoro =

Godo
- Location in Burkina Faso
- Coordinates: 12°42′N 2°1′W
- Country: Burkina Faso
- Region: Centre-Ouest Region
- Province: Boulkiemdé Province
- Department: Nanoro Department

Population (2019)
  - Total: 1,314
- Time zone: UTC+0 (GMT 0)

Godo is a village in the Nanoro Department of Boulkiemdé Province in central western Burkina Faso.

Population
Year	Pop.	±%
2006	814	—
2019	1,314	+61.4%
