= Troup Independent School District =

School district in Texas

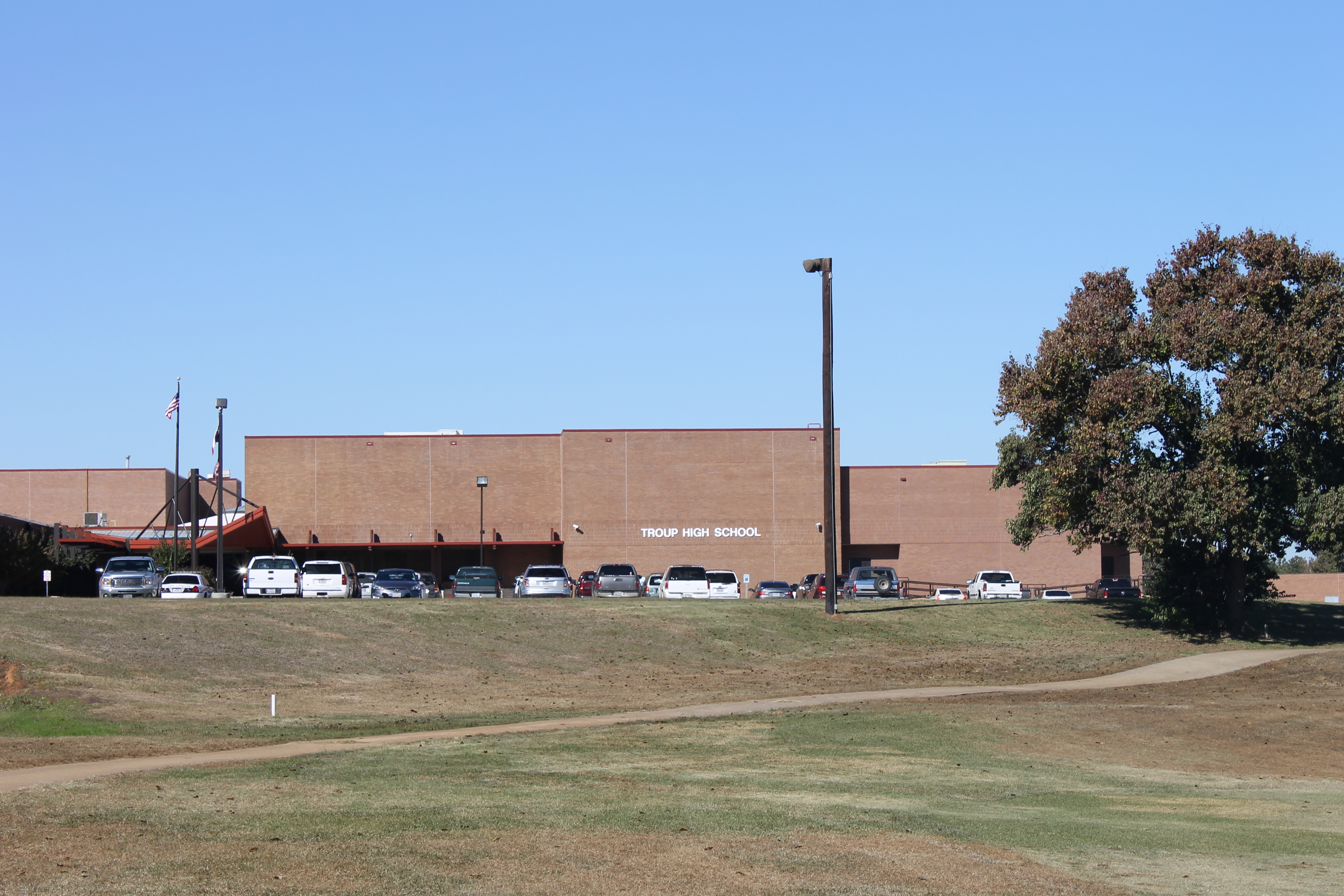
Troup High School

Troup Independent School District is a public school district based in Troup, Texas (USA).

The district is located in southeastern Smith County and extends into a small portion of northeastern Cherokee County.

Troup ISD has three schools:

- Troup High School (Grades 9-12)
- Troup Middle School (Grades 6-8)
- Troup Elementary School (Grades PK-5)

In the early 1990s Troup made it to four consecutive AA basketball State championships winning two in a row led by towering posts Gregg Austin and Jaime Kendrick.

In 2011, the school district was rated "recognized" by the Texas Education Agency.
