= Ted Sitton =

American football player and coach (1932–2016)

Biographical details
- Born: January 30, 1932; Stamford, Texas, U.S.
- Died: April 15, 2016 (aged 84); Abilene, Texas, U.S.

Playing career
- 1950–1951: Abilene Christian
- Position: Quarterback

Coaching career (HC unless noted)
- 1967–1978: Abilene Christian (assistant)
- 1979–1984: Abilene Christian

Head coaching record
- Overall: 33–28–1

Accomplishments and honors

Awards
- LSC Coach of the Year (1981)

Charles Ted Sitton Sr. (January 30, 1932 – April 15, 2016) was an American football coach. He was the 12th head football coach at Abilene Christian University in Abilene, Texas, serving for six seasons, from 1979 to 1984, and compiling a record of 33–28–1.

== Head coaching record ==
Year	Team	Overall	Conference	Standing	Bowl/playoffs
Abilene Christian Wildcats (Lone Star Conference) (1979–1984)
1979	Abilene Christian	7–4	3–4	T–5th	
1980	Abilene Christian	2–8	1–6	7th	
1981	Abilene Christian	8–2	5–2	T–2nd	
1982	Abilene Christian	6–4–1	4–3	T–2nd	
1983	Abilene Christian	7–3	4–3	4th	
1984	Abilene Christian	3–7	2–2	3rd	
Abilene Christian:		33–28–1	19–20		
Total:		33–28–1			
