= Dacissé, Nanoro =

Coordinates: 12.6595°N 2.2943°W

Dacissé
- Interactive map of Dacissé
- Country: Burkina Faso
- Region: Centre-Ouest Region
- Province: Boulkiemdé Province
- Department: Nanoro Department

Population (2019)
  - Total: 2,354
- Time zone: UTC+0 (GMT 0)

Dacissé is a town in the Nanoro Department of Boulkiemdé Province in central western Burkina Faso.

Population
Year	Pop.	±%
1985	1,403	—
2006	1,888	+34.6%
2019	2,354	+24.7%
