= Jack Kiser (American football coach) =

American football player and coach (born 1949)

Biographical details
- Born: February 4, 1949 (age 77)

Playing career
- c. 1970: Abilene Christian
- Position: Defensive tackle

Coaching career (HC unless noted)
- 1986: Texas Tech (assistant)
- 1987–1991: Texas (assistant)
- 1992: Southwest Texas State (DC)
- 1993–1995: Abilene Christian (DC)
- 1996–1999: Abilene Christian
- 2010: Abilene Christian (assistant)

Head coaching record
- Overall: 21–20

Jack Dale Kiser (born February 4, 1949) is an American former football coach. He was the 16th head football coach at Abilene Christian University in Abilene, Texas, serving for four seasons, from 1996 to 1999, and compiling a record of 21–20.

== Coaching career ==
In 1986, Kiser was hired as an assistant coach at Texas Tech University by head football coach David McWilliams. He left Texas Tech after the 1986 season when McWilliams was named the head football coach at the University of Texas at Austin, and served as a defensive assistant there from 1987 to 1991. In 1992, Kiser became defensive coordinator at Southwest Texas State University.

== Head coaching record ==
Year	Team	Overall	Conference	Standing	Bowl/playoffs
Abilene Christian Wildcats (Lone Star Conference) (1996–1999)
1996	Abilene Christian	6–4	4–3	T–3rd	
1997	Abilene Christian	7–4	5–4 / 4–3	T–5th / T–3rd (South)	
1998	Abilene Christian	4–6	5–4 / 4–3	T–5th / T–3rd (South)	
1999	Abilene Christian	4–6	4–5 / 4–5	T–8th / T–5th (South)	
Abilene Christian:		21–20	18–16		
Total:		21–20			
