= A. B. Morris =

American football and baseball player (1900-1983)

- Morris pictured in Prickly Pear 1925, Abilene Christian yearbook

Biographical details
- Born: April 13, 1900; DeSoto, Texas, U.S.
- Died: May 4, 1983 (aged 83); Abilene, Texas, U.S.

Playing career

Football
- 1920–1922: Texas A&M

Baseball
- 1921–1923: Texas A&M
- 1922: Henryetta Hens
- 1923: Ardmore Snappers
- 1924: Ardmore Bearcats
- Positions: Quarterback (football); Second baseman, shortstop (baseball)

Coaching career (HC unless noted)

Football
- 1923: Greenville HS (TX)
- 1924–1941: Abilene Christian
- 1942: Abilene Christian (assistant)
- 1946: Abilene Christian (assistant)

Basketball
- 1924–1943: Abilene Christian
- 1945–1955: Abilene Christian

Administrative career (AD unless noted)
- 1927–1969: Abilene Christian

Head coaching record
- Overall: 61–75–18 (college football); 304–242 (college basketball); 4–3 (high school football)

Accomplishments and honors

Championships
- Football; 2 Texas Conference (1939–1940)

Asbury Bratten "Bugs" Morris (April 13, 1900 – May 4, 1983) was an American football and baseball player, coach of football and basketball, and college athletics administrator. He was the fifth head football coach at Abilene Christian University in Abilene, Texas, serving for 18 seasons, from 1924 until 1941, and compiling record of 61–75–18. Morris was also the head basketball coach at Abilene Christian from 1924 to 1943 and again from 1945 to 1955, tallying a mark of 304–242. Morris also coached Greenville High School in 1923 to a 4–3 mark.

== Head coaching record ==
=== College football ===
Year	Team	Overall	Conference	Standing	Bowl/playoffs
Abilene Christian Wildcats (Texas Intercollegiate Athletic Association) (1924–1932)
1924	Abilene Christian	3–4–2	1–3	T–11th	
1925	Abilene Christian	2–5–2	2–1–1	T–4th	
1926	Abilene Christian	4–4	2–2	5th	
1927	Abilene Christian	6–1–1	4–1	2nd	
1928	Abilene Christian	5–4	4–1	T–2nd	
1929	Abilene Christian	6–1–1	2–1–1	T–4th	
1930	Abilene Christian	2–7–1	1–3–1	8th	
1931	Abilene Christian	4–5	3–2	2nd (Western)	
1932	Abilene Christian	2–6–1	1–4	5th	
Abilene Christian Wildcats (Texas Conference) (1933–1941)
1933	Abilene Christian	5–3–2	2–1–2	T–3rd	
1934	Abilene Christian	1–7–2	1–3–1	T–8th	
1935	Abilene Christian	1–6–3	1–4–1	T–6th	
1936	Abilene Christian	1–7–1	1–4–1	T–5th	
1937	Abilene Christian	0–9	0–6	9th	
1938	Abilene Christian	6–2–1	3–2–1	4th	
1939	Abilene Christian	6–2–1	5–1	T–1st	
1940	Abilene Christian	7–2	5–1	T–1st	
1941	Abilene Christian	6–3	5–1	T–2nd	
Abilene Christian:		67–78–18	38–40–9		
Total:		67–78–18			
National championship Conference title Conference division title or championship game berth
