= Sittaon =

- Location in Burkina Faso
- Coordinates: 12°39′N 2°6′W
- Country: Burkina Faso
- Region: Centre-Ouest Region
- Province: Boulkiemdé Province
- Department: Nanoro Department

Population (2019)
  - Total: 966
- Time zone: UTC+0 (GMT 0)

Sittaon is a village in the Nanoro Department of Boulkiemdé Province in central western Burkina Faso.

Population
Year	Pop.	±%
2006	689	—
2019	966	+40.2%
