= Goerke Field =

Stadium in Stevens Point, Wisconsin

Coordinates: 44.525246°N 89.561507°W

Goerke Park
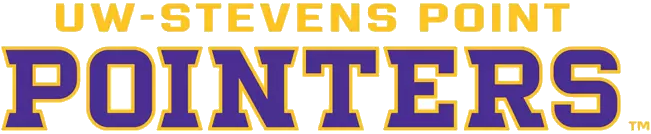
- Interactive map of Goerke Park
- Full name: Community Stadium at Goerke Park
- Address: 1100 Minnesota Ave; Stevens Point, WI; United States
- Owner: UW–Stevens Point
- Operator: UW–Stevens Point Athletics
- Capacity: 4,000
- Type: Stadium
- Current use: Football
- Public transit: Central Transportation

Construction
- Opened: 1932; 94 years ago

Tenant
- Wisconsin–Stevens Point Pointers football

Website
- athletics.uwsp.edu/community-stadium

Community Stadium at Goerke Park, or simply Goerke Park, is a stadium located on the campus of the University of Wisconsin–Stevens Point in Stevens Point, Wisconsin. It is primarily used for American football and is the home to the UW Stevens Point Pointers, the Stevens Point Area Senior High School Panthers, and the Pacelli High School Cardinals teams.

Until the 1980s, Goerke Field's stands consisted of a concrete grandstand on only the north side, for all fans, with press and coach boxes. By the 1980s, aluminum bleachers were installed on the south side, to accommodate visiting teams' fans, as well as adhere to WIAC standards.

The stadium was outfitted with artificial turf in 2008 due to the poor condition of the grass field it replaced, as it's the home playing field for three different teams, leading to the field becoming badly worn down by the end of the football seasons.
