= Troup High School =

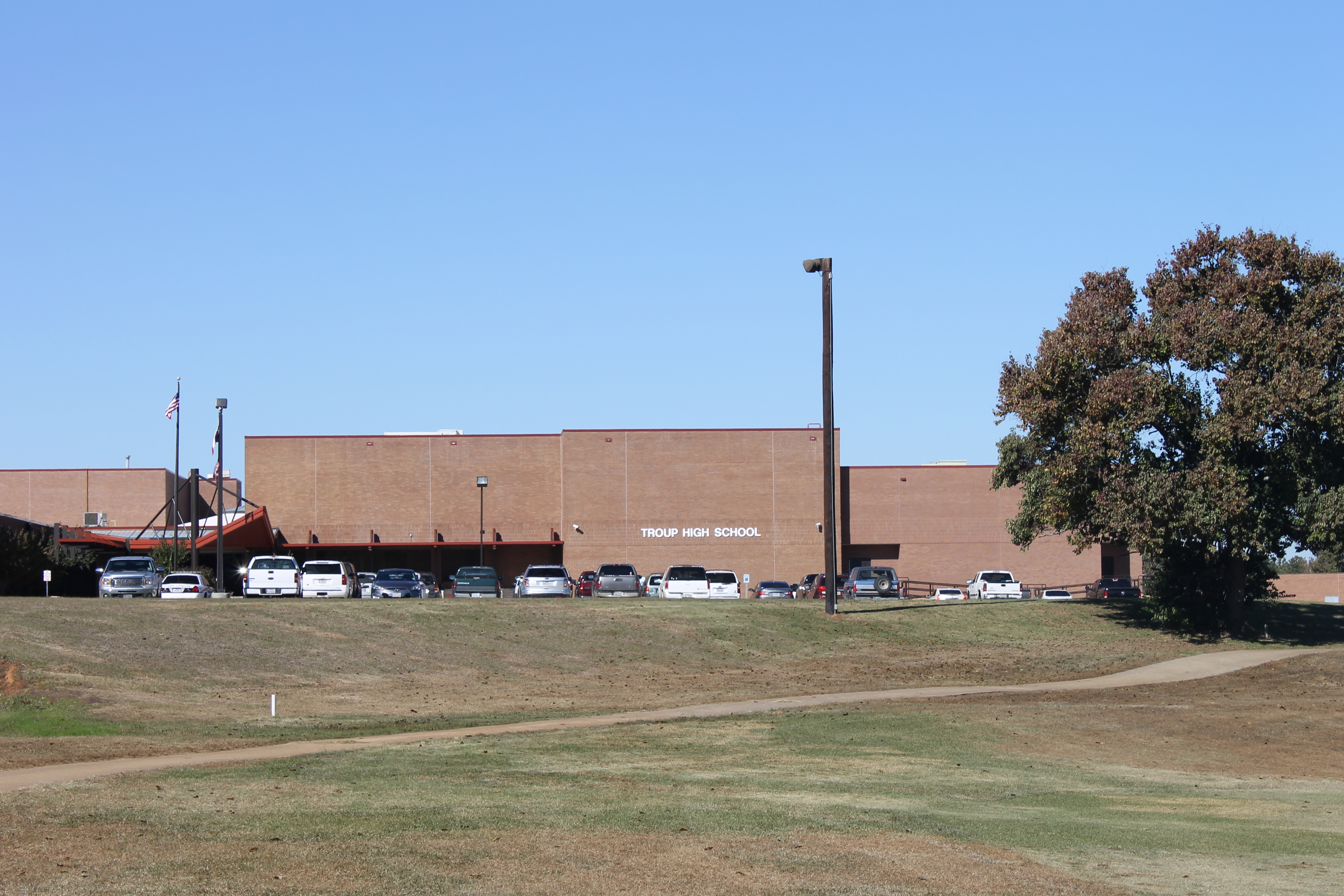

Location
- 927 Arp Dr. Troup, Texas 75789-2907; United States; 32.1536°N 95.1124°W

Information
- School type: Public high school
- School district: Troup Independent School District
- Principal: Landon Trent
- Staff: 28.92 (FTE)
- Grades: 9-12
- Enrollment: 323 (2023–2024)
- Student to teacher ratio: 11.17
- Colors: Maroon & White
- Athletics conference: UIL Class 3A
- Mascot: Tiger
- Yearbook: Tiger
- Website: Troup High School

Troup High School is a public high school located in the city of Troup, Texas, United States and classified as a 3A school by the UIL. It is a part of the Troup Independent School District located in extreme southern Smith County. In 2015, the school was rated "Met Standard" by the Texas Education Agency.

== Academics ==
- UIL Science Champions
  - 1995(2A)

== Athletics ==
The Troup Tigers compete in these sports -

Volleyball, Cross Country, Football, Basketball, Powerlifting, Golf, Tennis, Track, Baseball & Softball

Notable Football Ed Jasper- College Texas A&M NFL Philadelphia, Atlanta and Oakland

Football Keylon Kincade College SMU NFL Dallas

=== State Titles ===
Boys Golf - 3a State Champions 2016-2017 season

- Boys Basketball -
  - 1992(2A), 1993(2A)
- Football -
  - 1973(1A)

==== State Finalist ====
- Boys Basketball -
  - 1956(1A), 1990(2A), 1991(2A), 1994(2A)
- Football -
  - 2004(2A/D2)
