= 1977 NAIA Division I football season =

American college football season

- Regular season: August–November 1977
- Postseason: December 3–10, 1977
- National Championship: Kingdome; Seattle, WA
- Champions: Abilene Christian (2)

The 1977 NAIA Division I football season was the 22nd season of college football sponsored by the NAIA, was the eighth season of play of the NAIA's top division for football.

The season was played from August to November 1977 and culminated in the 1977 NAIA Division I Football National Championship. Known this year as the Apple Bowl, the title game was played on December 10, 1977 at the Kingdome in Seattle, Washington. Abilene Christian defeated Southwestern Oklahoma State in the Apple Bowl, 24–7, to win their second NAIA national title.

== Conference realignment ==
=== Conference changes ===
- This is the final season that the NAIA officially recognizes a football champion from the Mid-Eastern Athletic Conference.

=== Membership changes ===
Team	1976 conference	1977 conference
Chadron State	Nebraska College	Independent (NAIA)
Peru State	Nebraska College	Independent (NAIA)
Sul Ross	Lone Star (NAIA Division I)	TIAA (NAIA Division II)
Tarleton State	Lone Star (NAIA Division I)	TIAA (NAIA Division II)
Wayne State	Nebraska College	Central States

== Conference standings ==
1977 Arkansas Intercollegiate Conference football standings
	Conf.					Overall
Team	W		L		T	W		L		T
No. 10 Henderson State $	5	–	1	–	0	9	–	2	–	0
Central Arkansas	4	–	2	–	0	7	–	3	–	0
Southern Arkansas	3	–	3	–	0	6	–	3	–	1
Arkansas Tech	3	–	3	–	0	6	–	4	–	0
Arkansas–Monticello	2	–	4	–	0	4	–	6	–	1
Ouachita Baptist	2	–	4	–	0	4	–	6	–	0
Harding	2	–	4	–	0	4	–	7	–	0
$ – Conference champion; Rankings from NAIA Division I poll

1977 Central States Intercollegiate Conference football standings
	Conf.					Overall
Team	W		L		T	W		L		T
No. 5 Kearney State $^	7	–	0	–	0	8	–	2	–	1
Wayne State (NE)	5	–	2	–	0	7	–	3	–	0
No. 20 Missouri Western	4	–	2	–	1	8	–	2	–	1
Washburn	4	–	2	–	1	6	–	3	–	1
Missouri Southern	2	–	5	–	0	5	–	5	–	0
Emporia State	2	–	5	–	0	3	–	7	–	0
Fort Hays State	1	–	5	–	1	3	–	7	–	1
Pittsburg State	1	–	5	–	1	1	–	8	–	1
$ – Conference champion; ^ – NAIA Division I playoff participant; Rankings from NAIA Division I poll

1977 Evergreen Conference football standings
	Conf.					Overall
Team	W		L		T	W		L		T
No. 17 Oregon College $	6	–	0	–	0	7	–	2	–	0
Western Washington	5	–	1	–	0	6	–	4	–	0
Eastern Washington	3	–	3	–	0	5	–	4	–	0
Central Washington	3	–	3	–	0	3	–	6	–	0
Southern Oregon	2	–	4	–	0	3	–	6	–	0
Eastern Oregon	1	–	5	–	0	2	–	7	–	0
Oregon Tech	1	–	5	–	0	2	–	7	–	0
$ – Conference champion; Rankings from NAIA Division I poll

1977 Lone Star Conference football standings
	Conf.					Overall
Team	W		L		T	W		L		T
No. 2 Abilene Christian +^	5	–	1	–	1	11	–	1	–	1
No. 3 Texas A&I +	5	–	1	–	1	8	–	1	–	1
No. 11 Angelo State	5	–	2	–	0	8	–	2	–	0
No. 15 Southwest Texas State	5	–	2	–	0	5	–	4	–	0
No. 13 East Texas State	4	–	3	–	0	7	–	4	–	0
Stephen F. Austin	2	–	5	–	0	2	–	8	–	0
Sam Houston State	1	–	6	–	0	1	–	10	–	0
Howard Payne	0	–	7	–	0	2	–	8	–	0
$ – Conference champion; ^ – NAIA Division I playoff participant; Rankings from NAIA Division I poll

1977 Oklahoma Intercollegiate Conference football standings
	Conf.					Overall
Team	W		L		T	W		L		T
No. 1 SW Oklahoma State $^	4	–	0	–	0	11	–	1	–	0
SE Oklahoma State	3	–	1	–	0	6	–	3	–	0
Northeastern State	2	–	2	–	0	4	–	5	–	1
East Central	1	–	3	–	0	5	–	5	–	0
NW Oklahoma State	0	–	4	–	0	4	–	7	–	0
$ – Conference champion; ^ – NAIA Division I playoff participant; Rankings from NAIA Division I poll

1977 Northern Intercollegiate Conference football standings
	Conf.					Overall
Team	W		L		T	W		L		T
Minnesota Morris $^	7	–	0	–	0	10	–	2	–	0
Bemidji State	5	–	2	–	0	6	–	4	–	0
Moorhead State	5	–	2	–	0	6	–	4	–	0
Minnesota Duluth	4	–	3	–	0	7	–	3	–	0
St. Cloud State	4	–	3	–	0	5	–	6	–	0
Michigan Tech	1	–	6	–	0	3	–	7	–	0
Winona State	1	–	6	–	0	3	–	7	–	0
Southwest State (MN)	1	–	6	–	0	1	–	8	–	0
$ – Conference champion; ^ – NCAA Division III playoff participant

1977 Pennsylvania State Athletic Conference football standings
	Conf.					Overall
Team	W		L		T	W		L		T
East Division
No. 4 Millersville xy	5	–	0	–	0	8	–	2	–	0
Kutztown	4	–	1	–	0	7	–	2	–	0
East Stroudsburg	3	–	2	–	0	6	–	2	–	0
Bloomsburg	2	–	3	–	0	4	–	5	–	0
Cheyney	1	–	4	–	0	4	–	5	–	0
Mansfield	0	–	5	–	0	2	–	6	–	1
West Division
No. 8 Clarion xy$	5	–	0	–	1	9	–	0	–	1
Shippensburg	4	–	2	–	0	6	–	4	–	0
Slippery Rock	3	–	2	–	1	4	–	4	–	1
Lock Haven	3	–	3	–	0	5	–	5	–	0
Indiana (PA)	2	–	3	–	1	4	–	4	–	1
Edinboro	2	–	3	–	1	3	–	6	–	1
California (PA)	0	–	6	–	0	2	–	8	–	0
Championship: Clarion 25, Millersville 24
$ – Conference champion; x – Division champion/co-champions; y – Championship game participant; Rankings from NAIA Division I poll

1977 Rocky Mountain Athletic Conference football standings
	Conf.					Overall
Team	W		L		T	W		L		T
No. 12 Western State (CO) $	8	–	1	–	0	8	–	1	–	0
No. 14 Mesa	7	–	1	–	1	8	–	1	–	1
Southern Utah	7	–	2	–	0	8	–	2	–	0
Fort Lewis	6	–	2	–	1	6	–	2	–	1
Westminster (UT)	5	–	4	–	0	5	–	4	–	0
Adams State	3	–	6	–	0	3	–	7	–	0
Colorado Mines	2	–	7	–	0	3	–	7	–	0
Southern Colorado *	2	–	7	–	0	3	–	7	–	0
New Mexico Highlands	2	–	7	–	0	2	–	8	–	0
Western New Mexico	2	–	7	–	0	2	–	8	–	0
$ – Conference champion; * – Southern Colorado forfeited three conference wins, over Western State, Southern Utah, and Westminster; Rankings from NAIA Division I poll

1977 South Atlantic Conference football standings
	Conf.					Overall
Team	W		L		T	W		L		T
No. 7 Elon $	6	–	1	–	0	9	–	2	–	0
Mars Hill	5	–	2	–	0	7	–	3	–	0
No. 19 Presbyterian	5	–	2	–	0	7	–	3	–	1
No. 18 Gardner–Webb	5	–	2	–	0	7	–	4	–	0
Lenoir Rhyne	3	–	4	–	0	5	–	5	–	1
Carson–Newman	2	–	5	–	0	3	–	7	–	0
Catawba	1	–	6	–	0	3	–	7	–	0
Newberry	1	–	6	–	0	2	–	7	–	1
$ – Conference champion; Rankings from NAIA Division I poll

1977 West Virginia Intercollegiate Athletic Conference football standings
	Conf.					Overall
Team	W		L		T	W		L		T
Northern Division
No. 9 West Virginia Wesleyan xy	3	–	1	–	0	7	–	3	–	0
Salem x	3	–	1	–	0	7	–	3	–	0
Shepherd x	3	–	1	–	0	6	–	4	–	0
West Liberty State	1	–	3	–	0	3	–	6	–	1
Fairmont State	0	–	4	–	0	4	–	5	–	0
Southern Division
No. 4 Concord xy$^	4	–	0	–	0	9	–	2	–	1
West Virginia Tech	3	–	1	–	0	4	–	5	–	0
West Virginia State	2	–	2	–	0	3	–	8	–	0
Glenville State	1	–	3	–	0	1	–	8	–	0
Bluefield State	0	–	4	–	0	2	–	7	–	0
Championship: Concord 33, West Virginia Wesleyan 17
$ – Conference champion; x – Division champion/co-champions; y – Championship game participant; ^ – NAIA Division II playoff participant Conference standings based on power ratings; Rankings from NAIA Division II poll

1977 Wisconsin State University Conference football standings
	Conf.					Overall
Team	W		L		T	W		L		T
No. 6 Wisconsin–Stevens Point $^	7	–	0	–	1	8	–	2	–	1
Wisconsin–Whitewater	6	–	2	–	0	7	–	4	–	0
Wisconsin–La Crosse	5	–	2	–	1	6	–	2	–	2
Wisconsin–Platteville	5	–	3	–	0	7	–	3	–	0
Wisconsin–Oshkosh	3	–	5	–	0	5	–	5	–	0
Wisconsin–Eau Claire	3	–	5	–	0	5	–	6	–	0
Wisconsin–River Falls	3	–	5	–	0	4	–	6	–	0
Wisconsin–Stout	2	–	6	–	0	2	–	8	–	0
Wisconsin–Superior	1	–	7	–	0	1	–	9	–	0
$ – Conference champion; ^ – NAIA Division I playoff participant; Rankings from NAIA Division I poll

1977 NAIA Division I independents football records
	Conf.			Overall
Team	W	L	T	W		L		T
No. 9 Cameron		–		7	–	1	–	1
No. 16 Kentucky State		–		8	–	2	–	1
Wofford		–		7	–	3	–	1
Langston		–		4	–	5	–	0
Eastern New Mexico		–		4	–	6	–	0
Guilford		–		3	–	7	–	0
Liberty Baptist		–		3	–	7	–	0
Rankings from NAIA Division I poll

== Conference champions ==
Conference	Champion	Record
Arkansas	Henderson State	6–0
Central States	Kearney State	7–0
Evergreen	Oregon College	6–0
Lone Star	Abilene Christian; Texas A&I	5–1–1
NIC	Minnesota–Morris	7–0
Oklahoma	Southwestern Oklahoma State	4–0
PSAC	Clarion State	5–0–1
RMAC	Western State	8–1
South Atlantic	Elon	6–1
SWAC	Grambling State	6–0
WVIAC	Concord	7–1–1
Wisconsin State	Wisconsin–Stevens Point	7–0–1

== Postseason ==
Semifinals; December 3, 1977
Wisconsin–Stevens Point	7
Abilene Christian*	35
Kearney State	7
Southwestern Oklahoma State*	21

1977 Apple Bowl; December 10, 1977; Seattle, WA
Abilene Christian	24
Southwestern Oklahoma State	7

== See also ==
- 1977 NAIA Division II football season
- 1977 NCAA Division I football season
- 1977 NCAA Division II football season
- 1977 NCAA Division III football season
