= Troup, Texas =

City in Smith and Cherokee counties in Texas, United States

- City
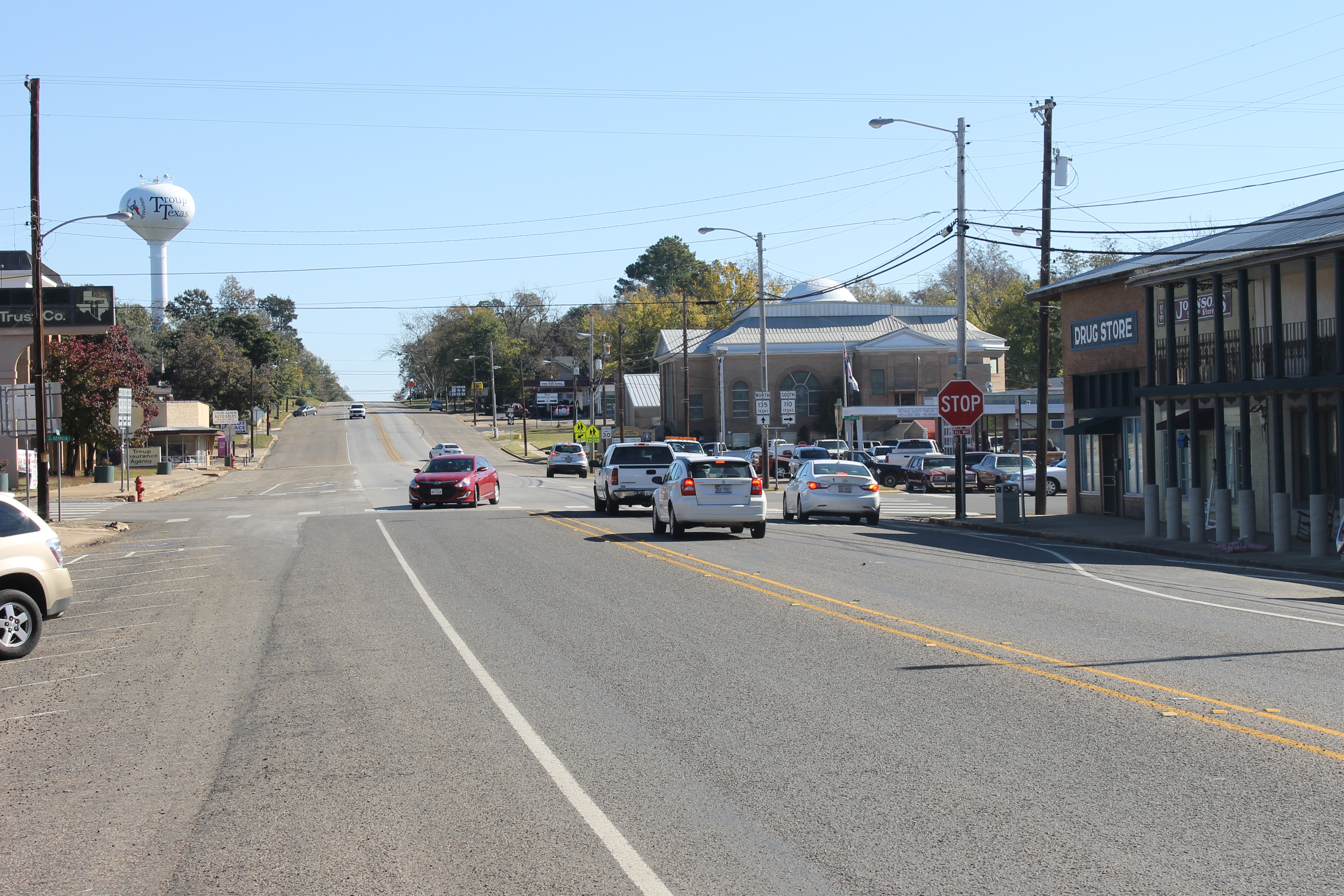
- East along SH 110 / SH 135 in Downtown Troup, November 2014

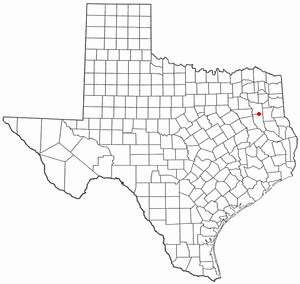
- Location of Troup, Texas

- Coordinates: 32°08′42″N 95°07′34″W
- Country: United States
- State: Texas
- Counties: Smith, Cherokee

Area
  - Total: 2.47 sq mi (6.39 km^{2})
  - Land: 2.46 sq mi (6.37 km^{2})
  - Water: 0.012 sq mi (0.03 km^{2})
- Elevation: 472 ft (144 m)

Population (2020)
  - Total: 2,006
  - Density: 832/sq mi (321.1/km^{2})
- Time zone: UTC-6 (Central (CST))
  - Summer (DST): UTC-5 (CDT)
- ZIP code: 75789
- Area codes: 903, 430
- FIPS code: 48-73724
- GNIS feature ID: 2412097
- Website: trouptx.com

Troup is a city in Smith and Cherokee counties in Texas, United States. Its population was 2,006 at the 2020 census. Troup lies in two counties in East Texas.

== History ==
Troup is situated between the two very old Choctaw, Chickasaw, and Creek intertribal settlements of Nanih Shinuk (Sand Hill) and Ofunlo Hina (Screech Owl Bend).

Troup was developed as a railroad town when the International Railroad Company opened the Palestine-Troupe line in 1872. The town was platted in 1873.

The town may have been named after a governor or a county in Georgia.

== Geography ==
Troup is located in southeastern Smith County. The city limits extend south into Cherokee County. Texas State Highway 110 passes through the center of town, leading northwest 19 miles (31 km) to Tyler and south 26 miles (42 km) to Rusk. Texas State Highway 135 shares two blocks of Duval Street (named after John Crittenden Duval, the only survivor of the Goliad Massacre, and known as the "Father of Texas literature") with Highway 110 in the center of town; it leads northeast 25 miles (40 km) to Kilgore and southwest 17 miles (27 km) to Jacksonville.

According to the United States Census Bureau, the city of Troup has a total area of 2.4 square miles (6.2 km^{2}), of which 0.01 square miles (0.03 km^{2}), or 0.44%, is covered by water.

== Demographics ==
Historical population
Census	Pop.	Note	%±
1880	352		—
1890	465		32.1%
1900	724		55.7%
1910	1,126		55.5%
1920	1,258		11.7%
1930	1,318		4.8%
1940	1,526		15.8%
1950	1,539		0.9%
1960	1,667		8.3%
1970	1,668		0.1%
1980	1,911		14.6%
1990	1,659		−13.2%
2000	1,949		17.5%
2010	1,869		−4.1%
2020	2,006		7.3%
U.S. Decennial Census

=== 2020 census ===
As of the 2020 census, Troup had a population of 2,006, and the median age was 34.0 years. 28.1% of residents were under the age of 18 and 13.2% of residents were 65 years of age or older. For every 100 females there were 92.7 males, and for every 100 females age 18 and over there were 89.1 males age 18 and over.

0.0% of residents lived in urban areas, while 100.0% lived in rural areas.

There were 734 households in Troup, of which 41.1% had children under the age of 18 living in them. Of all households, 42.0% were married-couple households, 16.8% were households with a male householder and no spouse or partner present, and 34.7% were households with a female householder and no spouse or partner present. About 26.8% of all households were made up of individuals and 13.9% had someone living alone who was 65 years of age or older.

There were 844 housing units, of which 13.0% were vacant. The homeowner vacancy rate was 0.9% and the rental vacancy rate was 8.1%.

Racial composition as of the 2020 census
Race	Number	Percent
White	1,355	67.5%
Black or African American	354	17.6%
American Indian and Alaska Native	13	0.6%
Asian	10	0.5%
Native Hawaiian and Other Pacific Islander	0	0.0%
Some other race	76	3.8%
Two or more races	198	9.9%
Hispanic or Latino (of any race)	287	14.3%

=== 2000 census ===
As of the 2000 census, 1,949 people, 731 households, and 491 families were residing in the city. The population density was 829.9 inhabitants per square mile (320.4/km^{2}). The 839 housing units averaged 357.3 units per square mile (138.0 units/km^{2}). The racial makeup of the city was 73.01% White, 20.88% African American 0.62% Native American, 0.41% Asian, 0.10% Pacific Islander, 3.03% from other races, and 1.95% from two or more races. Hispanics or Latinos of any race were 6.93% of the population.

Of the 731 households, 35.7% had children under the age of 18 living with them, 46.1% were married couples living together, 17.1% had a female householder with no husband present, and 32.8% were not families. About 29.7% of all households were made up of individuals, and 18.5% had someone living alone who was 65 years of age or older. The average household size was 2.60, and the average family size was 3.24.

In the city, the age distribution was 29.8% under 18, 8.5% from 18 to 24, 27.0% from 25 to 44, 17.6% from 45 to 64, and 17.1% who were 65 or older. The median age was 34 years. For every 100 females, there were 81.6 males. For every 100 females age 18 and over, there were 77.7 males.

The median income for a household in the city was $29,969, and for a family was $35,750. Males had a median income of $30,761 versus $18,370 for females. The per capita income for the city was $13,554. About 13.6% of families and 18.8% of the population were below the poverty line, including 25.0% of those under age 18 and 19.1% of those age 65 or over.

== Education ==
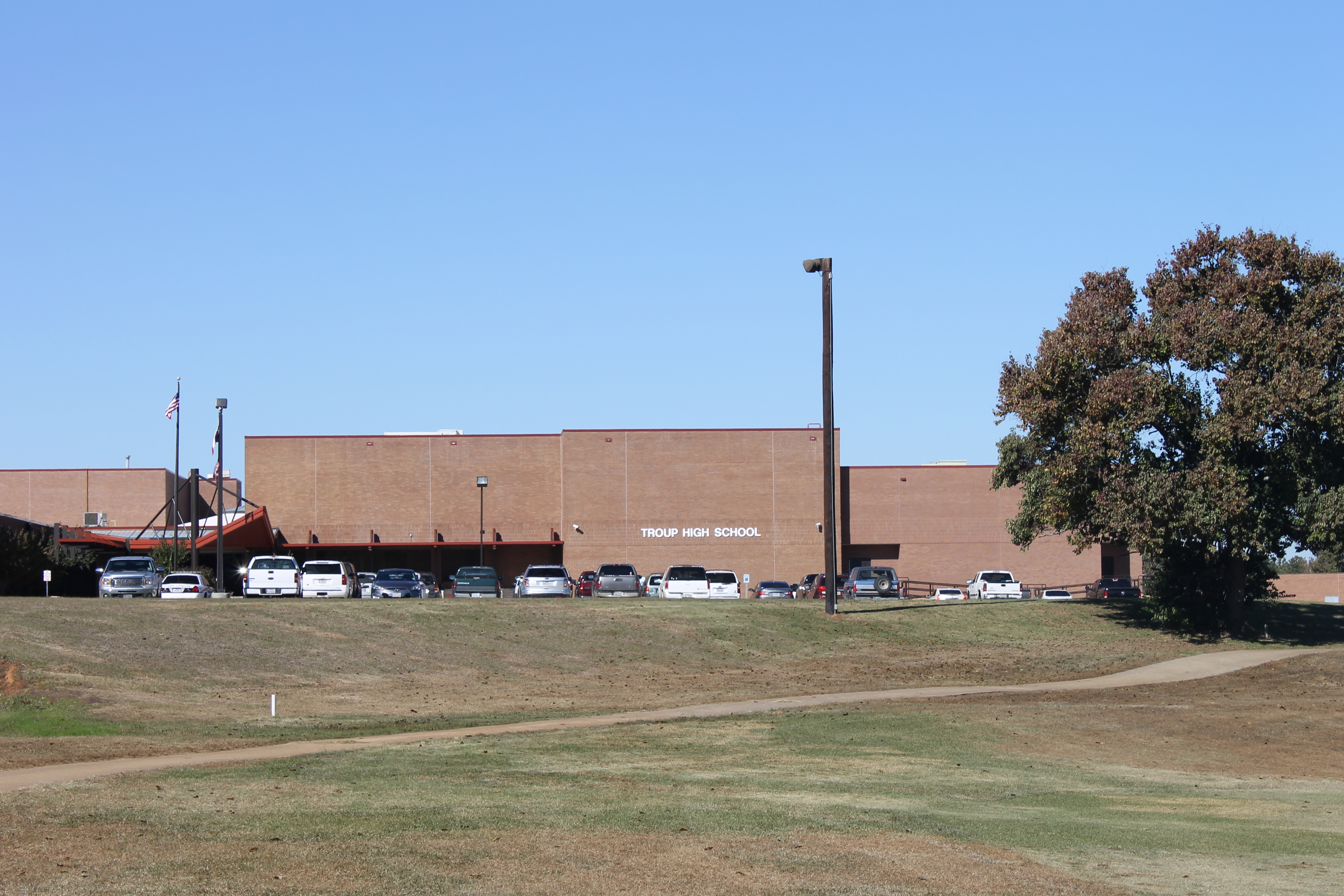
Troup High School, November 2014

Public education in the city of Troup is provided by the Troup Independent School District.

Troup High School was the 1995 Texas 2A state science champion.

=== Athletics ===
The Troup High School Tigers won the Texas 1A state football championship in 1973 and the Texas 2A state boys' basketball championship in 1992 and 1993. The Tigers also competed in the 2004 Texas State Football Championship, losing to the Crawford Pirates in the final game. Troup High School golfers won the Texas B state golf championship in 1951, the Texas 1A state golf championship in 1971, and the Texas 2A state golf championship in 1985, and competed in the Texas 2A state golf Championship in 2007. They also won the 2017 3A golf state championship. Numerous students have won event state championships in track and field over the years.

Troup is also the hometown of Byron Payton, a member of the United States 1980 Olympic boxing team. He died with 21 other members of the team on 14 March 1980 when their Polish Airlines Ilyushin IL-62 crashed short of the runway in Warsaw, Poland. The Byron Payton Memorial Gym in Troup is named after him. The Byron Payton Memorial Fight Night has been held there annually in his honor since 1985.

Former Troup Tiger standout Keylon Kincade enjoyed an All Conference career at SMU, leading the WAC in yards from scrimmage in 2003, as well as carries in both 2002 and 2003. He played a game in 2006 with the Dallas Cowboys and was named the Whataburger Coach of the Week in November 2019 while at Winona High.

== See also ==
- List of municipalities in Texas
