= Gode (disambiguation) =

Gode is a city in the Somali Region of Ethiopia.

Gode may also refer to:

- Gode (surname), a surname
- Gode (woreda), woreda in the Somali Region of Ethiopia
- Gode Gode, administrative ward in the Mpwapwa district of the Dodoma Region of Tanzania
- Gode Airport, public airport in the city of Gode, in eastern Ethiopia
- Gode Zone, public airport in the city of Gode, in eastern Ethiopia
- Gode Venkata Juggarow (1817–1856), Indian astronomer and instrument maker
- Gode Wind Farm, offshore wind farms located north-west of Norderney in the German sector of North Sea

== See also ==
- Godé
- Godet (disambiguation)
- Gothi
