= Gadot =

Gadot may refer to:

- Gadot, Israel, a kibbutz in northern Israel
- Gadot (surname), including people with the name

== See also ==
- Godot
