= Godet =

Godet may refer to:

- a brand name of cognac
- Godet (sewing), a sewing technique that adds width and volume to a garment
- Godet (surname), a surname
- Godet Island, now Hinson's Island, an island of Bermuda
- Godet African Burial Ground, unmarked historical burial ground for enslaved Africans in Sint Eustatius, Dutch Caribbean

== See also ==
- Gaudet
- Les Godets, an education building designed by French architect Jean Nouvel in Antony, France
- Godot (disambiguation)
