= Godet (surname) =

Godet is a surname

- Christopher Godet (borm 1998), Bahamian footballer
- Damien Godet (born 1986), French professional BMX cyclist
- Danielle Godet (1927–2009), French stage and film actress
- Dion Godet (born 1965), Bahamanian football coach
- Fabienne Godet (born 1964), French film director and screenwriter
- Frédéric Louis Godet (1812–1900), Swiss Protestant theologian
- Paul Godet des Marais (1647–1709), French Bishop of Chartres
- Quentin Gode, French guitarist

== See also ==
- Gaudet
- Gode (surname)
- Godet (disambiguation)
