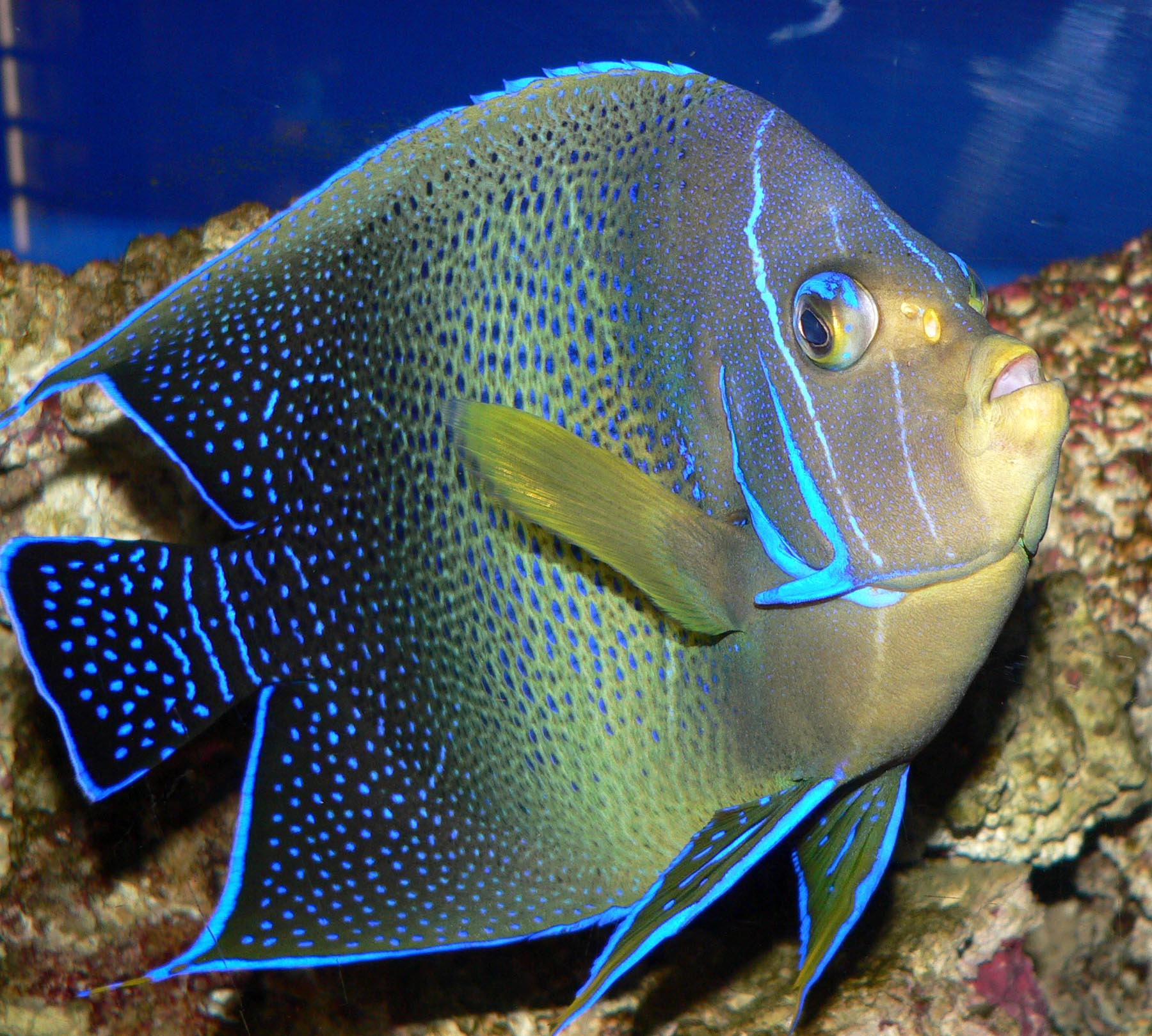

Conservation status
- Least Concern (IUCN 3.1)

Scientific classification
- Kingdom: Animalia
- Phylum: Chordata
- Class: Actinopterygii
- Order: Acanthuriformes
- Family: Pomacanthidae
- Genus: Pomacanthus
- Species: P. semicirculatus

Binomial name
- Pomacanthus semicirculatus (Cuvier, 1831)

Synonyms
- Holacanthus semicirculatus Cuvier, 1831; Pomacanthops semicirculatus (Cuvier, 1831); Holacanthus alternans Cuvier, 1831; Holacanthus lepidolepis Bleeker, 1853; Holacanthus reginae Liénard, 1891; Holocanthus lasti von Bonde, 1934

= Pomacanthus semicirculatus =

Species of fish

Pomacanthus semicirculatus, also known as the semicircled angelfish, Koran angelfish, blue angelfish, zebra angelfish or half-circled angelfish, is a species of ray-finned fish, a marine angelfish, in the family Pomacanthidae. It is found in the Indo-West Pacific Ocean. It occasionally makes its way into the aquarium trade.

== Description ==
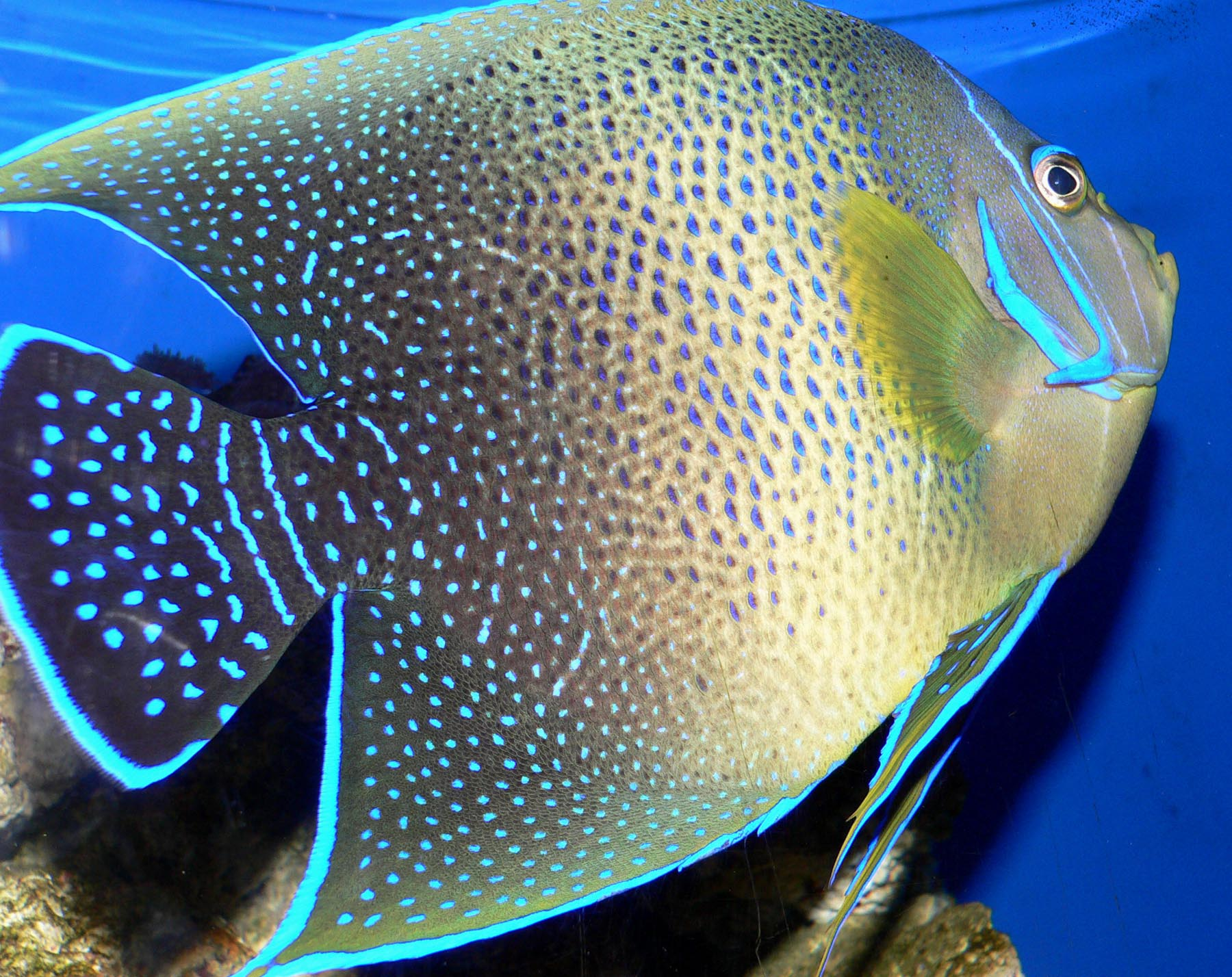
Adult Pomacanthus semicirculatus

Pomacanthus semicirculatus, like other members of the genus Pomacanthus has adults and juveniles which are very different from each other. The adults are brownish green in colour with the scales edged in blue creating a blue speckling over the body and tail. All of the fins, apart from the plain yellow pectoral fins, have blue margins. There are long, filamentous growths from the dorsal and anal fins.

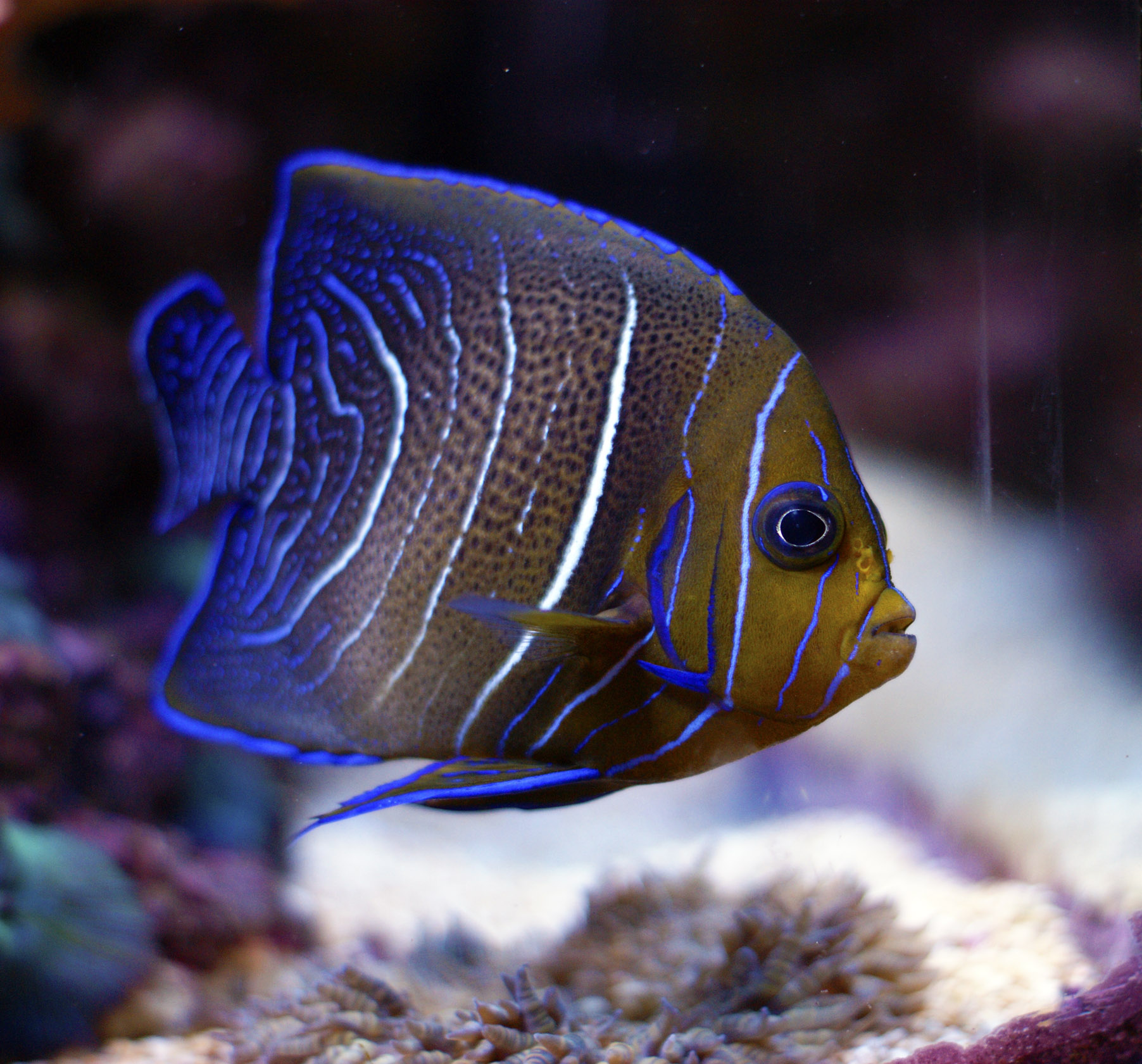
Juvenile Koran angelfish in a home aquarium

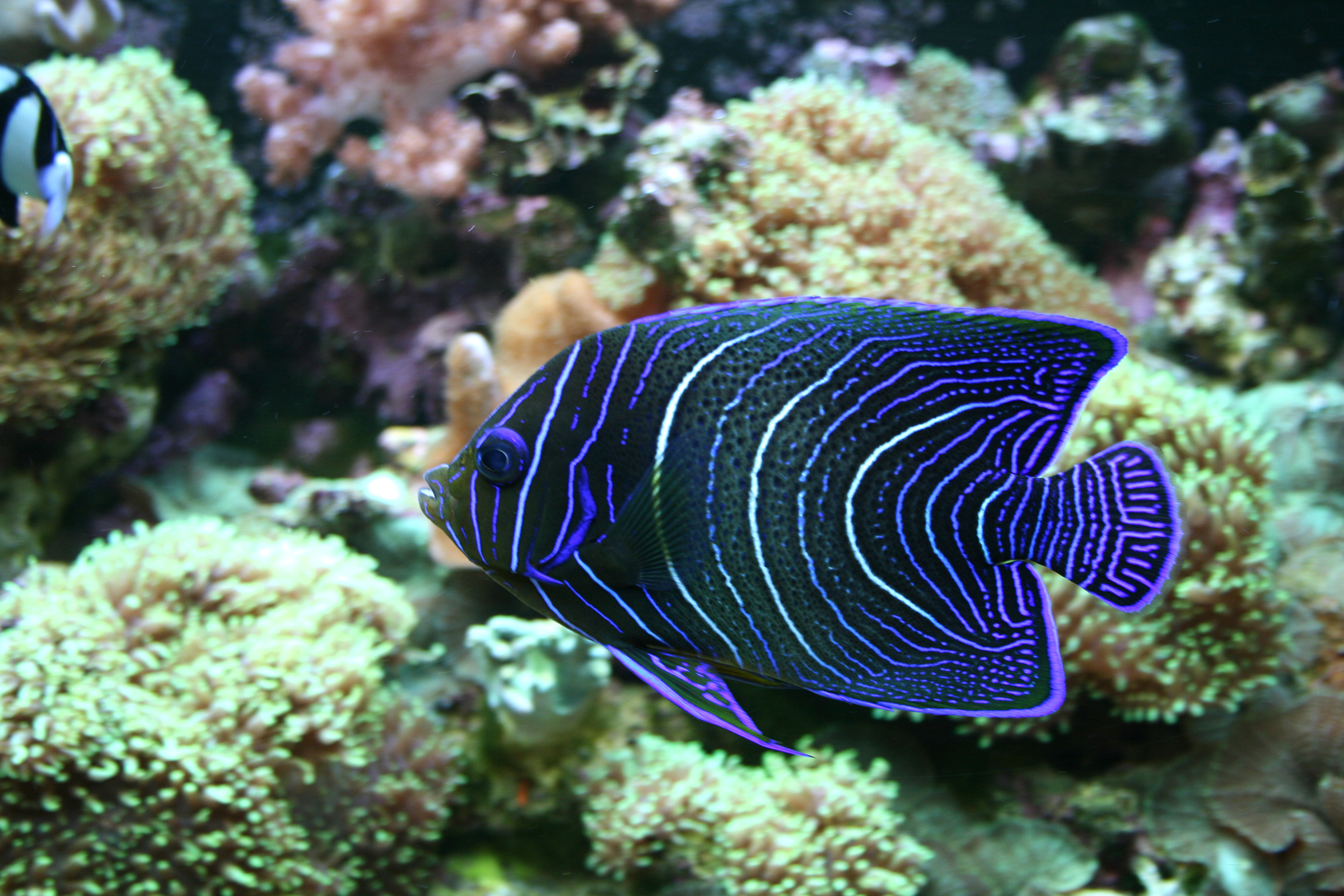
Juvenile Pomacanthus semicirculatus

The juveniles in contrast, are blue-black marked from top to bottom with narrow white stripes. At the head end the stripes are fairly straight but they become increasingly curved as they approach the base of the tail. The juveniles gradually adopt the adult colouration when they are 8 to 16 centimetres (3.1 to 6.3 in).

The dorsal fin contains 13 spines and 20–23 soft rays while the anal fin contains 3 spines and 18–22 soft rays. This species attains a maximum total length of 40 centimetres (16 in).

== Distribution ==
Pomacanthus semicirculatus is found in the Indo-Pacific region. Its range extends from the eastern coast of Africa from the southern Red Sea coast of Sudan south as far as South Africa. It then occurs east across the Indian and Pacific Oceans to Fiji, Tonga and Samoa.It occurs as far north as southern Japan and south to Australia. Within the Australian EEZ this species is widespread from the Houtman Abrolhos of Western Australia around the coast to as far south on the eastern coast as Sydney, juveniles extending farther south to Merimbula. It is also found at Christmas Island, the Cocos (Keeling) Islands as well as Lord Howe Island in the Tasman Sea. It has also been seen sporadically off the east coast of Florida since 1999 and at Oahu, Hawaii since 2005.

== Habitat and biology ==
Pomacanthus semicirculatus is found at depths between 1 and 40 m (3 ft 3 in and 131 ft 3 in) on sheltered coral reefs, where it feeds on algae, tunicates and sponges. The juveniles are very timid and difficult to approach. The juveniles occur in shallow sheltered areas, while adults show a preference for coastal reefs where there is rich coral growth which give the fish plenty of places to hide. It is typically encountered in pairs or as solitary individuals. The adults have been recorded from wrecks.

== Systematics ==
Pomacanthus semicirculatus was first formally described as Holacanthus semicirculatus in 1831 by the French anatomist Georges Cuvier (1769–1832) with the type locality given as Timor, Bourou, Waigeo, Indonesia, and Port Praslin, New Ireland Island, Bismarck Archipelago in Papua New Guinea. Some authorities place this species in the subgenus Arusetta. The specific name semicirculatus means "semicircular", a reference to the semicircular slender blue and white lines on the rear of the body on juveniles, which are lost on the adults.

== Utilisation ==
Pomacanthus semicirculatus is frequently encountered in the aquarium trade.
