= Gode (surname) =

Gode is a surname

- Alexander Gode (1906 –1970), German-born American linguist, translator and the driving force behind the creation of the auxiliary language Interlingua
- Andrew Gode (born 1990), an Australian cricketer
- Dan Gode, a Clinical Associate Professor of Accounting, Taxation, and Business law at New York University Stern School of Business
- Parashuram Krishna Gode, Sanskrit and Prakrit scholar and the first curator of the Bhandarkar Oriental Research Institute.
- Santoshrao Gode (1925 – 2000), Indian politician and a leader of the Indian National Congress party

== See also ==
- Gode (disambiguation)
- Godet (surname)
