= The Five Cents of Lavarede =

The Five Cents of Lavarede (French:Les cinq sous de Lavarède) may refer to:

- The Five Cents of Lavarede (1913 film)
- The Five Cents of Lavarede (1927 film)
- The Five Cents of Lavarede (1939 film)
