= St. David's Lighthouse =

Lighthouse in Bermuda

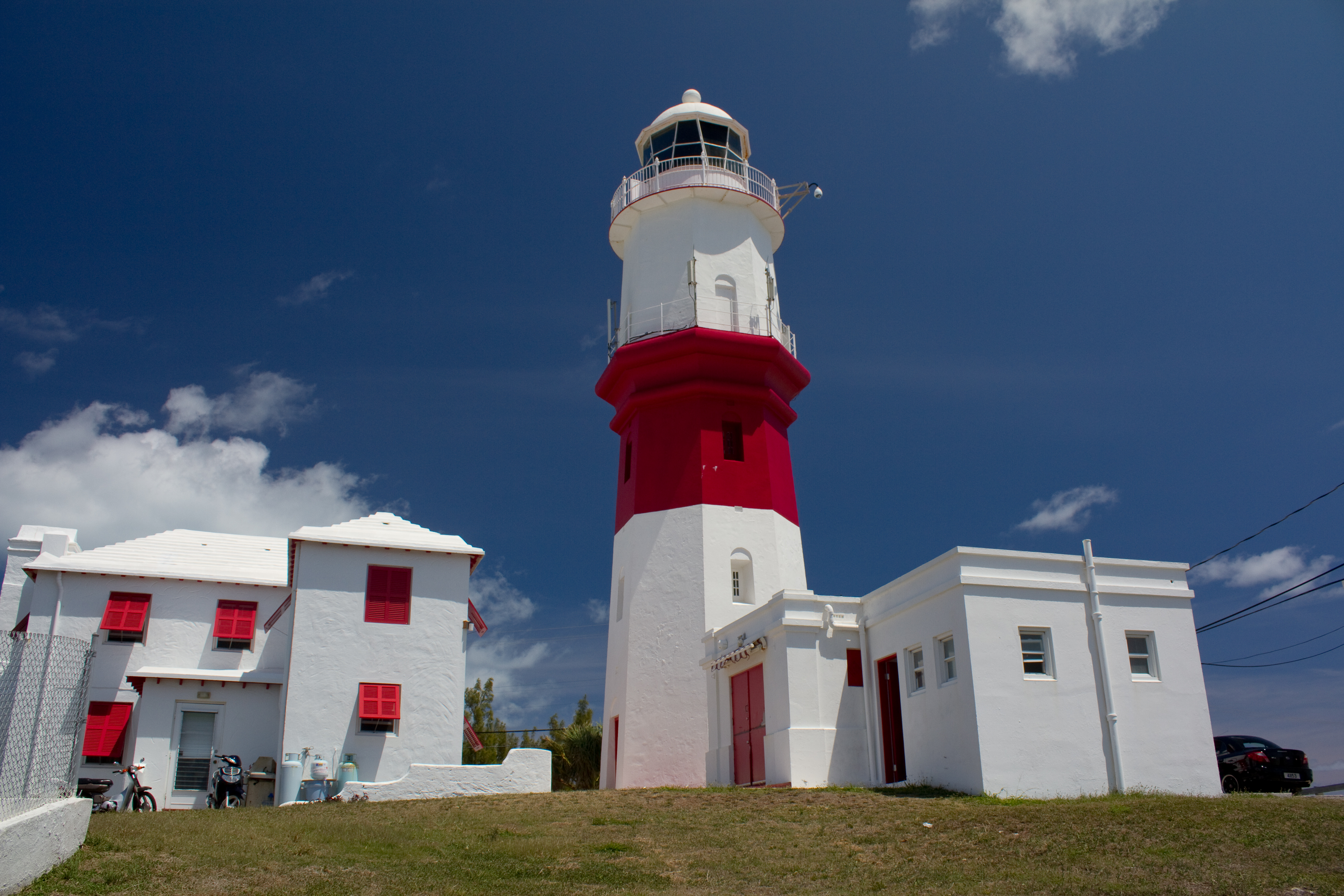
- St. David's in 2010
- Location: St. David's Island, Bermuda
- Coordinates: 32.364°N 64.65166°W

Tower
- Constructed: 1879
- Construction: limestone tower
- Height: 22 metres (72 ft)
- Shape: octagonal tower with double balcony and lantern
- Markings: white tower with a broad central red band, red trim

Light
- Focal height: 65 metres (213 ft)
- Lens: second order Fresnel lens
- Range: 15 nmi (28 km)
- Characteristic: Fl (2) W 20s.

St. David's Lighthouse is an active 19th century lighthouse sited at the eastern end of St. David's Island on a hill overlooking the headland of St. David's in Bermuda. It is one of only two 'traditional lighthouses' in Bermuda, the other being Gibbs Hill Lighthouse at the south-western end of the main island, both lights are well known tourist attractions.

== History ==
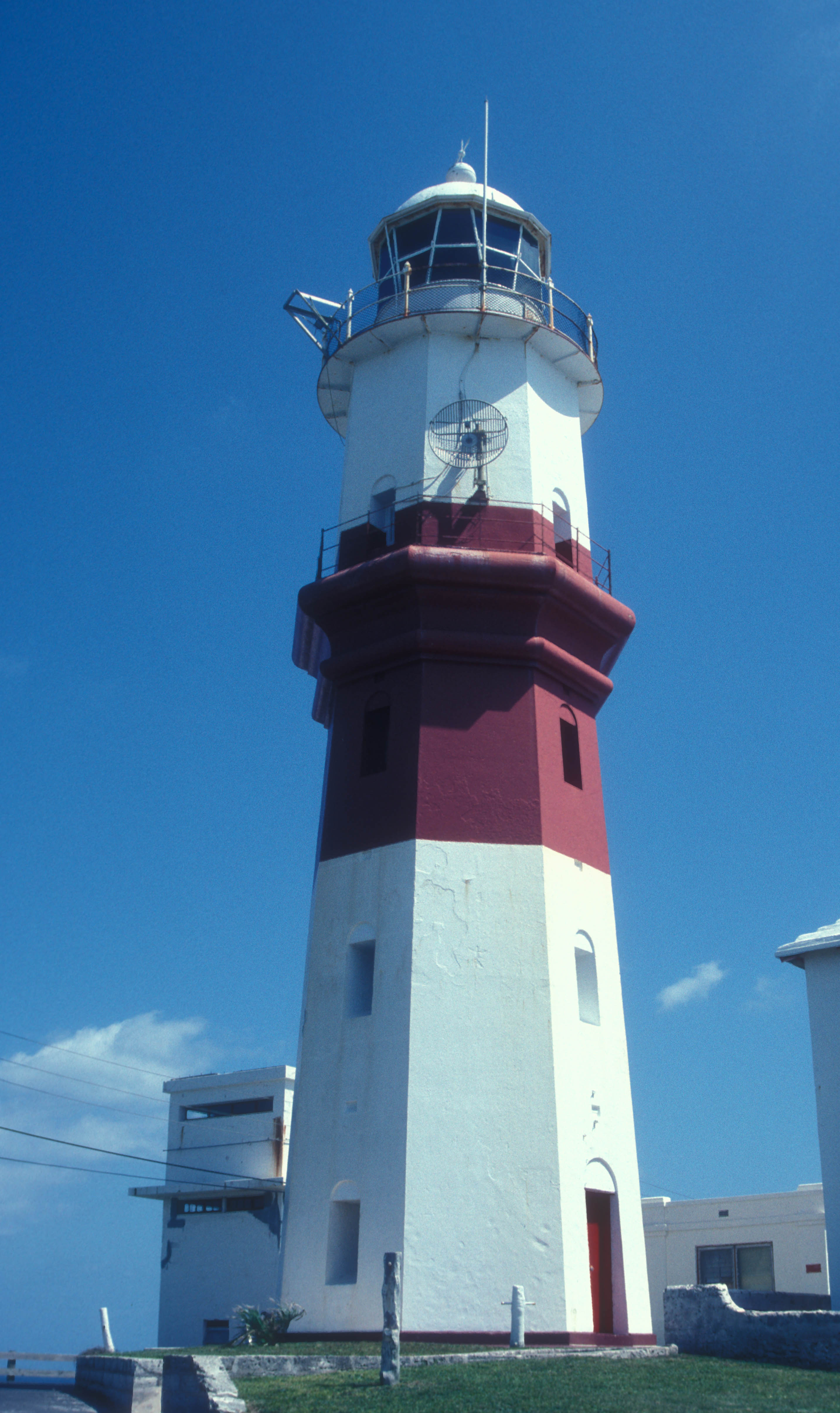
The tower in 2007

Construction started in 1876 and it became operational in 1879, it consists of an octagonal 22-metre-high (72 ft) tower of local limestone with two galleries and a lantern room. Originally painted white, it now has a distinctive red band daymark half-way up the tower. The original wick-type burner was replaced in the 1920s by a hood vapour kerosene unit.

With a focal height of 65 metres (213 ft) above sea level, the main light can be seen for 15 nautical miles, and has a light characteristic of a flash of white light every two seconds. A second light at a slightly lower level, displays fixed red and green lights to mark offshore shoals.

In 1940, the SS Pelinaion a Greek freighter en route from Africa to Baltimore which was oblivious to the fact that the lighthouses had been switched off due to the war, ran aground and broke in two on a reef to the east of St. David's Head. The sizeable wreck is now a popular dive site, with the boilers and triple-expansion steam engine still visible.

In 1976, some scenes from the motion picture The Deep were filmed in the lighthouse tower while a fake St. David's Lighthouse, built at Bermuda's Coney Island, was blown up as part of the movie's plot. Author Peter Benchley had included the lighthouse as a significant plot point in his novel of the same name.

The lighthouse is maintained by the Bermuda Department of Marine & Ports Services, and is registered under the international Admiralty number J4472 and has the NGA identifier of 110–11616.

The lighthouse is open daily to visitors from May to September each year.

== See also ==
- List of lighthouses in Bermuda
- Where was the lighthouse from THE DEEP?
