= Jael and Sisera =

Jael and Sisera are the Biblical figures from the Hebrew Bible, where Jael kills Sisera.

Jael and Sisera may also refer to:

== Art ==
- Jael and Sisera (Artemisia Gentileschi)
- Jael and Sisera (Northcote), a 1787 painting by James Northcote (1746–1831)
- Jael and Sisera, c. 1659–60, pen and brown ink Rembrandt
- Jael and Sisera, Nicolas Poussin
- Jael and Sisera, Speckaert

== Other ==
- Jael and Sisera (film), a 1911 short film
