= Nibagdo =

- Country: Burkina Faso
- Region: Centre-Ouest Region
- Province: Boulkiemdé Province
- Department: Sabou Department

Population (2019)
  - Total: 1,412
- Time zone: UTC+0 (GMT 0)

Nibagdo is a town in the Sabou Department of Boulkiemdé Province in central western Burkina Faso.

Population
Year	Pop.	±%
2006	1,290	—
2019	1,412	+9.5%
