= Women's Golf Day =

Annual golf competition

- Current season, competition or edition: May 26 – June 2, 2026
- Sport: Golf
- Founded: 2016
- Founder: Elisa Gaudet
- CEO: Elisa Gaudet
- Website: https://www.womensgolfday.com/

Women's Golf Day (WGD) is an annual worldwide event promoting women and girls by introducing them to the game of golf. Established in 2016, WGD takes place on a single day—often the first Tuesday in June—and features simultaneous events hosted at golf courses and clubs. Activities typically include basic golf instruction, practice sessions, shortened rounds for experienced players, and social networking gatherings. The next Women's Golf Day event will take place from May 26 to June 2, 2026.

== Ownership & Trademark ==
Women's Golf Day® is managed and operated by WGD, LLC, a privately held company. The name and logo are registered trademarks of WGD, LLC, and unauthorized use is prohibited.

== History ==
Women's Golf Day was founded by in 2016 by Elisa Gaudet, who sought to create a welcoming environment for women who are current players, and also newcomers who want to learn and enjoy golf on a global scale.

Sky Sports stated that Women's Golf Day helped raise the profile of women's golf and contributed to broader discussions about increasing female participation in the sport. Gulf News similarly noted the event's growing significance in the Middle East.

== Format ==
A typical Women's Golf Day event spans four hours, divided into two parts:

- Golf or Instruction (2 hours): Beginners can receive coaching on basic swing techniques, putting, or chipping; more experienced players might participate in a short round of golf.
- Social and Networking (2 hours): Participants gather to celebrate achievements, share experiences, and build connections. This portion often includes refreshments, guest speakers, and local club initiatives aimed at promoting women's health, empowerment, and community engagement.

== Global Reach and Local Events ==
WGD has been covered by a variety of national and local news outlets:

- In Hawaii, The Maui News reported on a Women's Golf Day event at Wailea that combined golf activities with fundraising for animal rescue. Another outlet, Maui Now, highlighted the day's positive impact on local women golfers.
- ZNS Bahamas described a WGD event in the Bahamas as "historic" for women's golf in the region.
- In Nigeria, Nan News covered the call for more women to embrace golf.
- The Dominican Republic's Diario Libre highlighted Women's Golf Day gatherings organized by local LPGA amateurs, while Portugal's SIC Notícias reported on the event's success in inviting more women to try the sport.

== Industry Reception ==
Golf-specific publications have featured Women's Golf Day:

- Golf Business News tracked WGD's impact on growing the game and stimulating interest among new demographics.
- Golf Course Industry discussed how WGD events boosted engagement and outreach efforts at local clubs.
- Women & Golf reported on special Women's Golf Day initiatives, including celebrating at the New York Stock Exchange.
