= List of lighthouses in Bermuda =

This is a list of lighthouses in Bermuda.

== Lighthouses ==
Name	Image	Year built	Location & coordinates	Class of Light	Focal height	ARLHS number	Admiralty number	Range nml
Chub Heads Lighthouse		n/a	offshore Sandys Parish; 32°17′11″N 64°58′47″W	V Q (9) W 15s.	18 metres (59 ft)	BER-017	J4546	12
Eastern Blue Cut Lighthouse	Image	n/a	offshore Ireland Island; 32°23′50.0″N 64°52′36.8″W	Mo (U) W 10s.	18 metres (59 ft)	BER-011	J4547	12
Gibbs Hill Lighthouse		1844	Southampton Parish; 32°15′10″N 64°50′05″W	Fl W 10s.	108 metres (354 ft)	BER-010	J4550	26
Hinson's Island Lighthouse		n/a	Hinson's Island; 32°17′04″N 64°48′22″W	Fl R 2.5s.	4 metres (13 ft)	11752	J4506	5
Hogfish Cut Lighthouse		n/a	offshore Southampton Parish; 32°15′34″N 64°53′01″W	Fl R 4s.	4 metres (13 ft)	11736	J4544	5
Horseshoe Island Lighthouse	Image	n/a	St. George's; 32°22′40″N 64°39′54″W	F G	n/a	n/a	J4476.5	8
Kitchen Shoal Lighthouse	Image	n/a	offshore 4 miles north-east of St. George's; 32°26′04.2″N 64°37′40.2″W	Fl (3) W 15s.	14 metres (46 ft)	BER-014	J4471.5	12
North Rock Lighthouse	Image	1912 est.	offshore 8 miles north of St. George's; 32°28′31″N 64°46′09″W	Fl (4) W 20s.	21 metres (69 ft)	BER-015	J4471	12
North East Breaker Lighthouse		n/a	6 miles north of St. George's; 32°28′43″N 64°40′56″W	Fl W 2.5s.	14 metres (46 ft)	BER-018	J4471.3	12
Pearl Island Lighthouse		n/a	Great Sound; 32°17′30″N 64°50′14″W	Fl Y 4s.	6 metres (20 ft)		J4514	5
St. David's Lighthouse		1879	St. David's Island; 32°21′51″N 64°39′06″W	Fl (2) W 20s. F R G	65 metres (213 ft)	BER-009	J4472	15
Town Cut Channel Outer Lighthouse		n/a	St. George's; 32°22′44″N 64°39′49″W	F R	14 metres (46 ft)		J4477	8
Two Rocks Passage Lighthouse		n/a	Great Sound; 32°17′33″N 64°48′41″W	V Q G	6 metres (20 ft)		J4498	5

== See also ==
- Lists of lighthouses and lightvessels
