= Tanghin-Wobdo =

- Location in Burkina Faso
- Coordinates: 12°9′N 2°1′W
- Country: Burkina Faso
- Region: Centre-Ouest Region
- Province: Boulkiemdé Province
- Department: Sabou Department

Population (2019)
  - Total: 1,334
- Time zone: UTC+0 (GMT 0)

Tanghin-Wobdo is a town in the Sabou Department of Boulkiemdé Province in central western Burkina Faso.

Population
Year	Pop.	±%
1985	673	—
2006	1,224	+81.9%
2019	1,334	+9.0%
