= Sabou Department =

Sabou
- Department
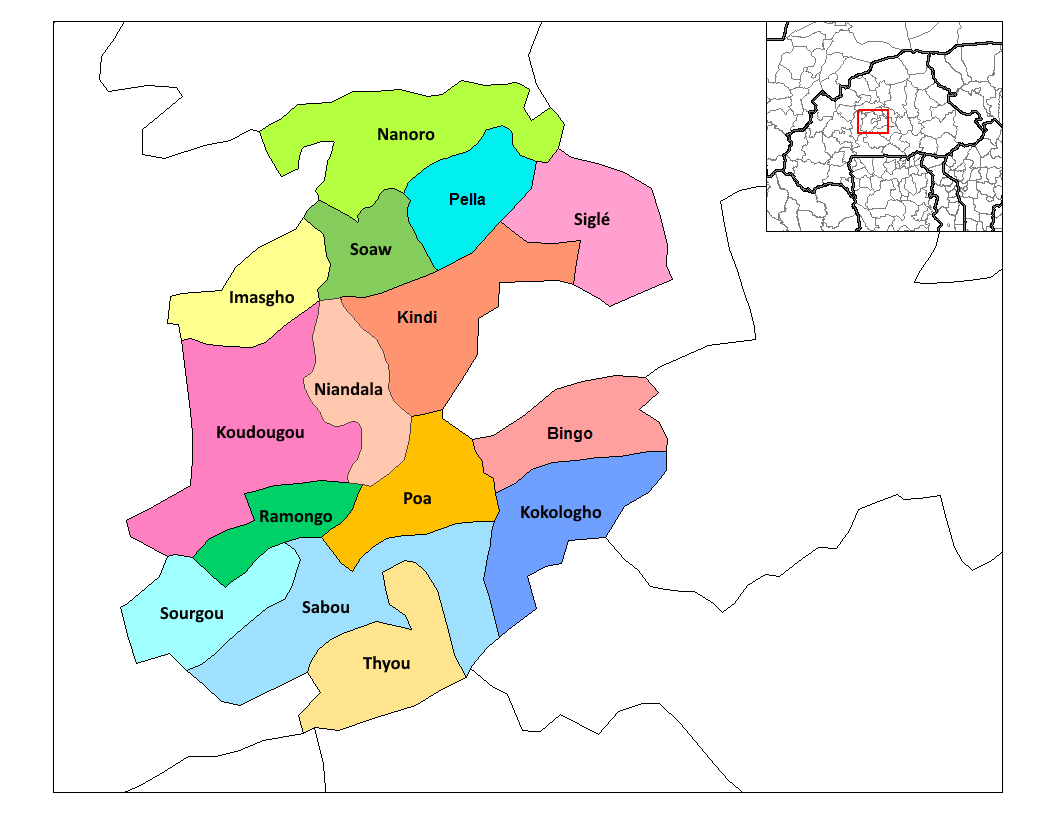
- Sabou Department location in the province
- Coordinates: 12°4′N 2°14′W
- Country: Burkina Faso
- Province: Boulkiemdé Province

Area
  - Total: 176.1 sq mi (456.1 km^{2})

Population (2019 census)
  - Total: 61,836
  - Density: 351.1/sq mi (135.6/km^{2})
- Time zone: UTC+0 (GMT 0)

Sabou is a department or commune of Boulkiemdé Province in central Burkina Faso. As of 2019 it has a population of 61,836. Its capital is the town of Sabou.

== Towns and villages ==
- Sabou
- Bourou
- Godé
- Ipendo
- Koupéla
- Nabadogo
- Nadiolo
- Namaneguema
- Nariou
- Nibagdo
- Ouézindougou
- Sarana
- Savili
- Tanghin-Wobdo
