= Savili =

- Location in Burkina Faso
- Coordinates: 12°6′N 2°2′W
- Country: Burkina Faso
- Region: Centre-Ouest Region
- Province: Boulkiemdé Province
- Department: Sabou Department

Population (2019)
  - Total: 3,299
- Time zone: UTC+0 (GMT 0)

Savili is a town in the Sabou Department of Boulkiemdé Province in central western Burkina Faso.

Population
Year	Pop.	±%
1985	2,010	—
2006	2,589	+28.8%
2019	3,299	+27.4%
