= Ipendo =

- Location in Burkina Faso
- Coordinates: 12°1′N 2°19′W
- Country: Burkina Faso
- Region: Centre-Ouest Region
- Province: Boulkiemdé Province
- Department: Sabou Department

Population (2019)
  - Total: 3,885
- Time zone: UTC+0 (GMT 0)

Ipendo is a town in the Sabou Department of Boulkiemdé Province in central western Burkina Faso.

Population
Year	Pop.	±%
1985	2,394	—
2006	2,999	+25.3%
2019	3,885	+29.5%
