= The Five Cents of Lavarede (1913 film) =

- Directed by: Henri Andréani
- Written by: Henri Chabrillat; Paul d'Ivoi
- Produced by: Maurice Cammage
- Production company: Pathé Frères
- Distributed by: Pathé Frères
- Release date: 1913
- Country: France
- Languages: Silent; French intertitles

The Five Cents of Lavarede (French:Les cinq sous de Lavarède) is a 1913 French silent adventure film directed by Henri Andréani and starring Suzanne Goldstein and Godeau.

== Bibliography ==
- Goble, Alan. The Complete Index to Literary Sources in Film. Walter de Gruyter, 1999.
