= Nadiolo =

- Location in Burkina Faso
- Country: Burkina Faso
- Region: Centre-Ouest Region
- Province: Boulkiemdé Province
- Department: Sabou Department

Population (2019)
  - Total: 4,160
- Time zone: UTC+0 (GMT 0)

Nadiolo is a town in the Sabou Department of Boulkiemdé Province in central western Burkina Faso.

Population
| Year | Pop. | ±% |
|---|---|---|
| 2006 | 3,532 | — |
| 2019 | 4,160 | +17.8% |
