= Namaneguema =

- Location in Burkina Faso
- Coordinates: 12°8′N 2°15′W
- Country: Burkina Faso
- Region: Centre-Ouest Region
- Province: Boulkiemdé Province
- Department: Sabou Department

Population (2019)
  - Total: 2,332
- Time zone: UTC+0 (GMT 0)

Namaneguema is a town in the Sabou Department of Boulkiemdé Province in central western Burkina Faso.

Population
Year	Pop.	±%
1985	1,277	—
2006	1,764	+38.1%
2019	2,332	+32.2%
