= Sarana, Sabou =

Sarana
- Country: Burkina Faso
- Region: Centre-Ouest Region
- Province: Boulkiemdé Province
- Department: Sabou Department

Population (2019)
  - Total: 1,441
- Time zone: UTC+0 (GMT 0)

Sarana is a town in the Sabou Department of Boulkiemdé Province in central western Burkina Faso.

Population
| Year | Pop. | ±% |
|---|---|---|
| 1985 | 824 | — |
| 2006 | 1,092 | +32.5% |
| 2019 | 1,441 | +32.0% |
