= Gaudet =

Gaudet or Guadet is a French surname. Notable people with the surname include:

- Christopher Gaudet, Canadian actor
- Daniel Gaudet (born 1959), Canadian gymnast
- Elisa Gaudet, American golf writer
- Francine Gaudet (born 1948), Canadian politician
- Joseph Gaudet (1818–1882), Canadian politician
- Julien Guadet (1834–1908), French architect and professor
- Kevin Gaudet (born 1963), Canadian ice hockey coach
- Marguerite-Élie Guadet (1758–1794), French politician
- Mia M. Gaudet, American cancer epidemiologist
- Pete Gaudet (born 1942), American basketball coach
- Roger Gaudet (born 1945), Canadian politician
- Suzanne Gaudet (born 1981), Canadian curler
- Wayne Gaudet (born 1955), Canadian politician

== See also ==
- Château Guadet, a winery in Saint-Émilion, Bordeaux, France
- Gaudet Mater Ecclesia, the opening declaration of the Second Vatican Council
