= Nariou =

- Location in Burkina Faso
- Country: Burkina Faso
- Region: Centre-Ouest Region
- Province: Boulkiemdé Province
- Department: Sabou Department

Population (2019)
  - Total: 6,845
- Time zone: UTC+0 (GMT 0)

Nariou is a town in the Sabou Department of Boulkiemdé Province in central western Burkina Faso.

Population
Year	Pop.	±%
1985	4,637	—
2006	5,089	+9.7%
2019	6,845	+34.5%
