= Koupéla, Boulkiemdé =

Koupéla
- Location in Burkina Faso
- Coordinates: 11°58′N 2°23′W
- Country: Burkina Faso
- Region: Centre-Ouest Region
- Province: Boulkiemdé Province
- Department: Sabou Department

Population (2019)
  - Total: 2,232
- Time zone: UTC+0 (GMT 0)

Koupéla is a town in the Sabou Department of Boulkiemdé Province in central western Burkina Faso.

Population
Year	Pop.	±%
2006	1,732	—
2019	2,232	+28.9%
