= Nabadogo =

- Location in Burkina Faso
- Coordinates: 12°08′01″N 2°04′15″W
- Country: Burkina Faso
- Region: Centre-Ouest Region
- Province: Boulkiemdé Province
- Department: Sabou Department

Population (2019)
  - Total: 9,033
- Time zone: UTC+0 (GMT 0)

Nabadogo is a town in the Sabou Department of Boulkiemdé Province in central western Burkina Faso.

Population
Year	Pop.	±%
1985	4,674	—
2006	6,488	+38.8%
2019	9,033	+39.2%
