= Ouézindougou =

- Location in Burkina Faso
- Coordinates: 12°2′N 2°17′W
- Country: Burkina Faso
- Region: Centre-Ouest Region
- Province: Boulkiemdé Province
- Department: Sabou Department

Population (2019)
  - Total: 1,609
- Time zone: UTC+0 (GMT 0)

Ouézindougou is a town in the Sabou Department of Boulkiemdé Province in central western Burkina Faso.

Population
Year	Pop.	±%
1985	1,248	—
2006	1,619	+29.7%
2019	1,609	−0.6%
