= Henri Andréani =

French film director

- Born: 10 April 1877; La Garde-Freinet, Var, France
- Died: 3 April 1936 (aged 58); Paris, France
- Other name: Gustave Sarrus
- Occupation: Director
- Years active: 1908–1928 (film)

Henri Andréani (1877–1936) was a French film director of the silent era.

== Selected filmography ==
- David and Goliath (1910 film) (1910)
- Jael and Sisera (1911)
- The Five Cents of Lavarede (1913)

== Bibliography ==
- Goble, Alan. The Complete Index to Literary Sources in Film. Walter de Gruyter, 1999.
