= Godot =

Godot may refer to:

== Culture ==
- Godot, the eponymous character in Samuel Beckett's play Waiting for Godot
- Godot (band), an English synthpop band formed in the 1980s
- Buck Godot, a science fiction comic book series, and its title character
- Godot (Ace Attorney), a character from the video game Phoenix Wright: Ace Attorney – Trials and Tribulations

== Technology ==
- Godot (game engine), open source game engine
- Godot, the first tunnel boring machine for Elon Musk's The Boring Company

== See also ==
- The dictionary definition of Godotian at Wiktionary
- Gadot, Israel, a kibbutz in northern Israel
- Gadot (surname)
- Godeau, a surname
- Godet (disambiguation)
