= Sabou =

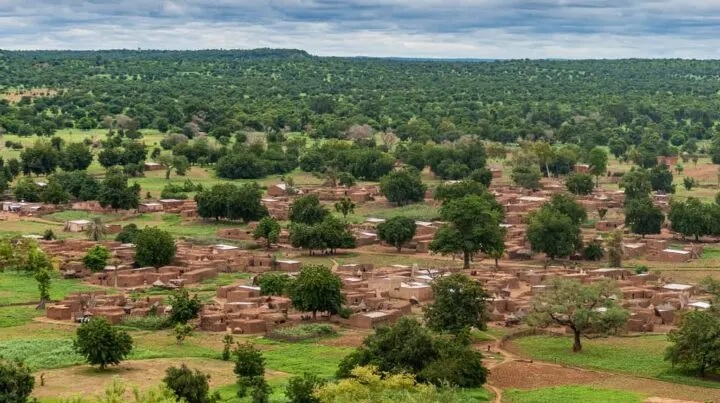
- Sabou

- Location in Burkina Faso
- Coordinates: 12°4′N 2°14′W
- Country: Burkina Faso
- Region: Centre-Ouest Region
- Province: Boulkiemdé Province
- Department: Sabou Department

Population (2019)
  - Total: 15,060
- Time zone: UTC+0 (GMT 0)

Sabou is the capital of the Sabou Department of Boulkiemdé Province in central western Burkina Faso.

Population
Year	Pop.	±%
1985	5,123	—
2006	9,047	+76.6%
2019	15,060	+66.5%
