= Jael and Sisera (film) =

- Directed by: Henri Andréani
- Based on: Book of Judges (Chapter 4 and 5)
- Production company: Pathé Frères
- Release date: 1911 (France)
- Country: France
- Language: French

Jael and Sisera (French: Jaël et Sisera) is a 1911 French silent film directed by Henri Andréani. The film portrays the biblical story of Jael and Sisera, found in the fourth and fifth chapters of the Book of Judges in the Bible.
