= Gode Venkata Juggarow =

Indian astronomer and instrument maker

Gode Venkata Juggarow (1817–1856) was an Indian astronomer and instrument maker. He was one of the few Indians who started and operated an astronomical observatory in British India at Visakhapatnam. He started his own observatory in Visakhapatnam at his residence in Daba Gardens.
