= Hinson's Island, Bermuda =

Hinson's Island Lighthouse
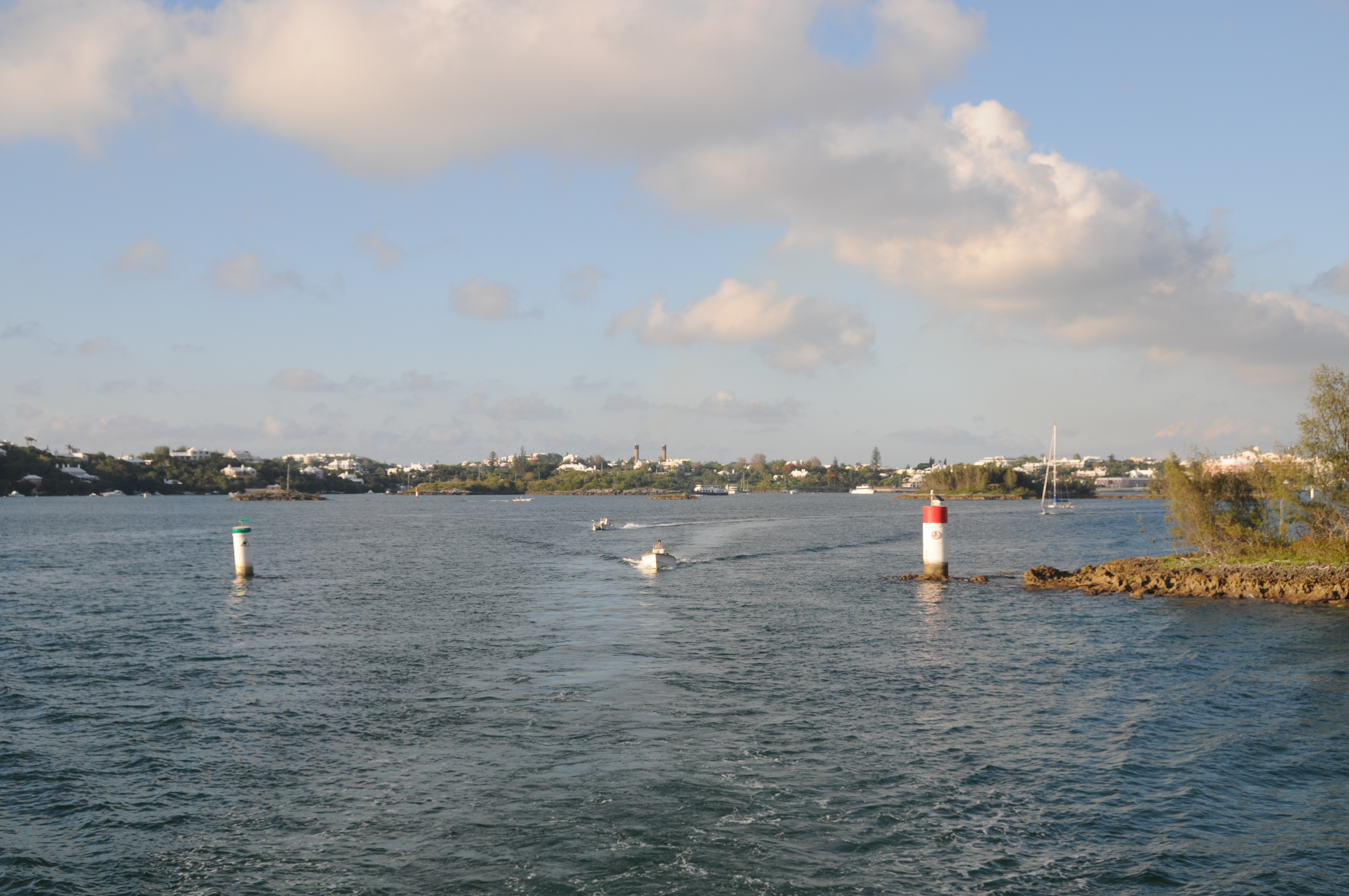
- Location: Hinson's Island, Paget Parish, Bermuda
- Coordinates: 32°17′04″N 64°48′22″W

Tower
- Height: 4 m (13 ft)
- Markings: white tower with red band
- Power source: solar power

Light
- Focal height: 4 m (13 ft)
- Range: 5 nmi (9.3 km; 5.8 mi)
- Characteristic: Fl R 2.5s

Hinson's Island is an island in Bermuda with a population above 50. The island has been inhabitaed since the early 17th century and was owned by multiple people under a quit-rent scheme before A. A. Jonson divided the island into lots in the 1940s.

== History ==
=== Private ownership ===
The island was most likely owned by John Dorrell in the early 17th century. Richard Norwood recorded the name of the island as Dorrel's Island in his survey of Bermuda taken between 1613 and 1617. Thomas Ackland was the occupant of the island when Norwood conducted his second survey from 1662 to 1663, and Norwood did not use the name Dorrel's Island. In the mid-18th century the island was known as Brown's Island.

By 1759, the island was crown land. Samuel Spofferth purchased the island through quit-rent for £625, 13s, 4d on 6 August 1759. Spofferth did not pay this figure and the quit-rent was not discharged until 1946. He died in intestacy and the island was sold by his family to Theodore Godet for £120 in 1775.

The island was named after Captain Hinson, who purchased the island in the 1800s and lived there as a hermit after his wife died. Admiralty charts from 1874 and 1894 list the area as Godet Island.

Smallpox broke out in Bermuda in 1830, and Henry Hunt offered a house on the island for use as a quarrantine zone according to Sister Jean Kennedy in Biography of a Colonial Town. However, this house was most likely located on Darrell's or Burt's Island.

During the Second Boer War around 4,600 prisoners of war were sent to Bermuda. On 8 March 1902, the island was declared a military zone. A boarding school for child prisoners of war was on the island. The boarding school had 180 prisoners in May, but the island was empty by August, and martial law was revoked on 28 October.

The Hinson family sold the island to Henry James Cox after the Second Boer War. Henry Hamilton Kitchener, the son of Governor Walter Kitchener, purchased the island from Cox in 1920. Kitchener built two seaplane hangers on the island, the first airbases on Bermuda, and attempted to form a volunteer air force in Bermuda. The last of Kitchener's hangars and barns was torn down in 1955. Kitchener flew a Avro 504 from his airbase in December 1919, the second time an airplane flew over Bermuda.

=== Modern ===
A. A. Jonson purchased the island from Kitchener in 1945. The quit-rent was ended in 1946, and turned the island into freehold property. Johnson had the island surveyed and turned a large portion of it into one-half acre lots. A road was constructed around the island. There were 15 lots sold and 6 houses on the island by 1952. Over 50 people live on the island as of 2026.

== Transportation ==
A main dock was constructed in the 1950s. A public ferry service has been provided by the government since 1959. Ferry services were reduced by the Ministry of Transport in July 2025.

== Politics ==
Hinson's Island is represented in the Parliament of Bermuda as a part of the Warwick North East constituency.

== Notable residents ==
- William Stevenson, author

== See also ==
- List of lighthouses in Bermuda

== Works cited ==
- "5 Historical Facts about Hinson's Island". The Bermudian Magazine. 16 May 2025. Archived from the original on 10 May 2026.
- "100 Year Anniversary Of Aviation In Bermuda". Bernews. 22 May 2019. Archived from the original on 10 May 2026.
- "Well-known author Stevenson dies". The Royal Gazette. 28 November 2013. Archived from the original on 10 May 2026.
- Ausenda, Stefano (15 September 2025). "Ferry service petition receives close to 650 signatures". The Royal Gazette. Archived from the original on 10 May 2026.
- Johnston-Barnes, Owain (9 January 2026). "New marina proposed for Hinson Island". The Royal Gazette. Archived from the original on 10 May 2026.
- Longley-Cook, L. (20 March 2025). "The Many Lives of Hinson's Island". The Bermudian Magazine. Archived from the original on 10 May 2026.
- Zuill, Rebecca (28 November 2012). "Election rivals are also good friends". The Royal Gazette. Archived from the original on 10 May 2026.
