= Elisa Gaudet =

American writer

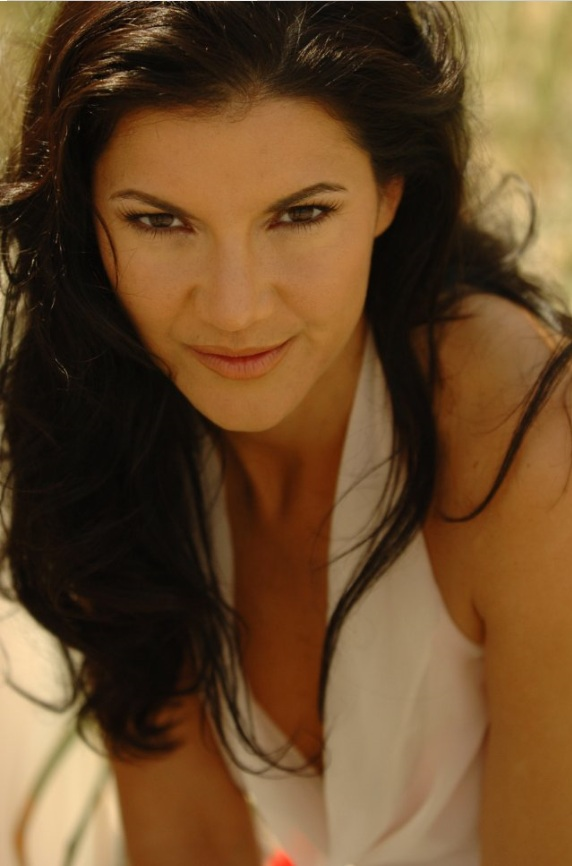
- Born: Arlington, Massachusetts, U.S.
- Occupations: Correspondent, Writer
- Known for: Founder of Women's Golf Day Two Good Rounds (book) "On the Lip" (sports column)
- Awards: 2016 - European Golf Course Owners Association Award (Significant Contribution to the Future of Golf) 2018 - National Golf Course Owners Association Champion Award; 2020 - International Sports Awards (Individual Sports Professional – Community Award); 2022 - Women in Golf Awards (International Woman of the Year); 2022 - 100 Successful Women in Business Award; 2022 - SF Business & Wealth Prestigious Women Award; 2023 - International Network of Golf (Business Achievement Award); 2023 - Golf Inc. Hilda Allen Award 2025 - Acquisition International Women in Golf Thought Leader of the Year

Elisa A. Gaudet is an American writer specializing in the golf industry. Her first book: Two Good Rounds - 19th Hole Stories from the World's Greatest Golfers was published in December 2011 and chronicles the "19th hole" behaviors of several well-known professional golfers.

She is also known for her syndicated sports column and blog, On the Lip, from which articles have been selected for publication in The Huffington Post, New England Golf Monthly, Stratosphere private jet magazine, as well as Florida Golf Central, Alaska In Flight magazine, Golfers Guide and other media outlets since 2003. She is also the founder of Women's Golf Day, a yearly global event that works to inform females of all ages about the joys of golf. Regarding her job, Elisa spends most of her time in New York City and Florida.

== Early life and career ==
Born in Arlington, Massachusetts, to parents Paul and Marie Gaudet, Elisa Gaudet began playing golf at the age of fourteen. After High School she attended George Mason University and received an undergraduate degree in English Writing and Art History. Gaudet then enrolled in graduate studies at Stanford in International Policy but left after two semesters to pursue a full-time modeling career. During this time she studied and lived abroad including course studies at the Sorbonne University in Paris, and Imperial College in London, and time spent modeling in Cape Town, South Africa and Tokyo, Japan.

In 2000, Gaudet began working for the Tour de las Américas and went on to work for the PGA Tour in 2001. In 2003, she founded her own consulting firm "Executive Golf International" specializing in golf industry marketing, strategic partnerships, and promotions. It was at this time that she also began her ongoing blog and industry column "On The Lip". Since the mid 90s Gaudet has also been featured in miscellaneous print and television ads as a model and spokeswoman, and she also played the character of Anne Isley in the television show Nash Bridges.

In 2016, Gaudet founded Women's Golf Day (WGD), a global initiative focused on introducing women and girls to golf. The event has grown to over 1,300 locations in 84 countries.

== Recognition ==
In 2022, Gaudet was named one of the "100 Successful Women in Business" by the Global Trade Chamber.

She was recognized in 2024 with the ING Industry Honors Award for Business Achievement.

Gaudet received the Hilda Allen Award from Golf Inc. in 2023, which recognizes women leaders in the golf industry.

In 2018 she received the Champion Award from the National Golf Course Owners Association.

== Media and Public Engagement ==
Gaudet has been featured in a variety of media platforms discussing entrepreneurship, women’s empowerment, and the growth of Women’s Golf Day. She appeared on the ModGolf Podcast, where she discussed the origin and expansion of WGD.

== Documentary Feature ==
In 2023, Gaudet was featured in the documentary Breaking with Tradition, which highlights trailblazers working to modernize and diversify the golf industry.

== Further Recognition ==
In addition to industry awards, Gaudet was named one of CityBiz’s “Prestigious Women of 2022,” a recognition honoring women leaders making an impact in their industries.

She was also profiled by Ladies in Golf for her efforts in making golf more inclusive, with features published in both English and Spanish.
