= Gibbs Hill Lighthouse =

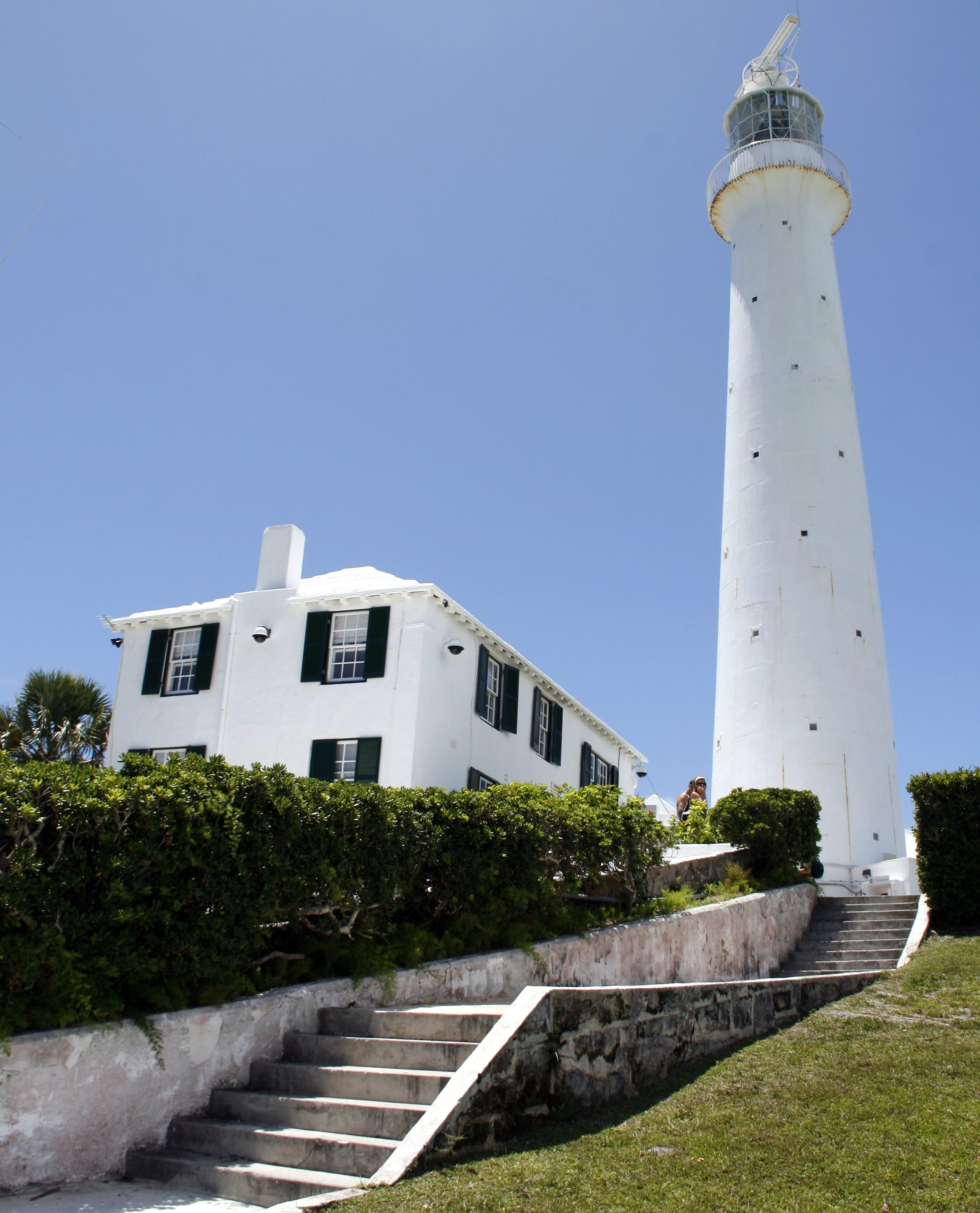
- Location: Gibbs Hill, Bermuda, United Kingdom
- Coordinates: 32°15′10″N 64°50′05″W

Tower
- Constructed: 1846
- Construction: cast iron
- Automated: 1964
- Height: 36 m (118 ft)
- Shape: tapered cylindrical tower with balcony and lantern
- Markings: White

Light
- Focal height: 108 m (354 ft)
- Lens: Fresnel lens
- Intensity: 500,000 candela
- Range: 26 nmi (48 km; 30 mi)
- Characteristic: Fl W 10s

Manufactured in 1844 by Cottam and Hallen of Cornwall Road, Lambeth; in their works within sight of Waterloo Bridge Erected by the Royal Engineers, the Gibb's Hill Lighthouse is the taller of two lighthouses on Bermuda, and one of the first lighthouses in the world to be made of cast-iron. This is because at that time, steel still was not able to be bent. The optic consists of a Fresnel lens from 1904 revolving on steel bearings. However, for most of its history, the lens revolved on a bed of 1,200 pounds (540 kg) of mercury. While it is certainly not extremely tall in lighthouse standards, the hill that it stands on is one of the highest on the island. The light's focal plane on Gibbs Hill Lighthouse, therefore, is at 354 feet (108 m) above sea level. Airplanes can see its flashes from over 100 miles (160 km) away.

The lighthouse has 185 steps to the top in eight flights. Until 1964, most of the light was run by hand, but in June of that year, the whole system was automated and runs on electricity. Sixty-thousand people ascended the lighthouse in 1985, and it continues to be a popular tourist attraction.

A radar antenna for marine shipping was installed atop the lighthouse in 1987 supported on a steel space frame fixed at the original bolt locations. The radar and supporting frame were undamaged in September 2003 despite the oscillation of the tower during Hurricane Fabian. This movement caused 2 imperial gallons (9.1 L; 2.4 US gal) of mercury to slop out of the lens support trough and put the light out of operation. The 1904 lens was repaired in 2004 with steel bearings to replace the mercury.

At the base of the tower is the Lighthouse Tea Room, a restaurant converted from the lighthouse keeper's former living quarters, where breakfast, lunch, and dinner are served daily.

== Gallery ==
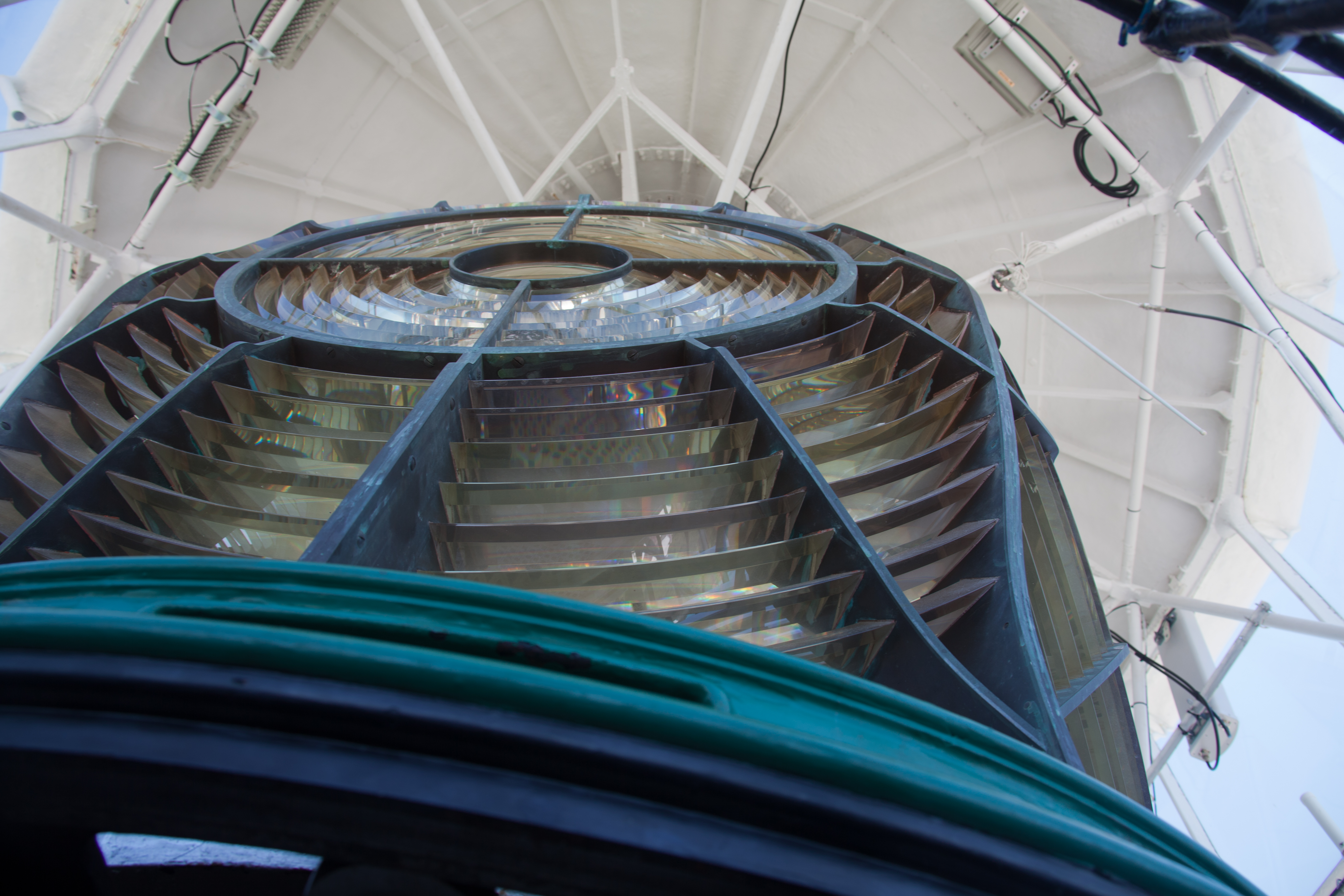
Gibbs Hill Lighthouse Lens

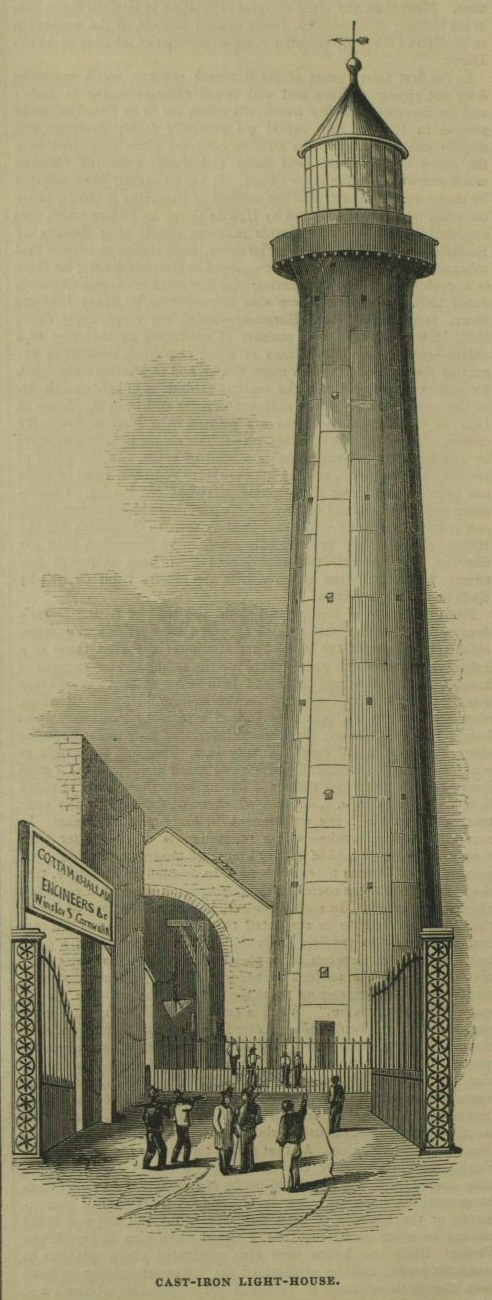
Trial erection in Lambeth, London in 1844

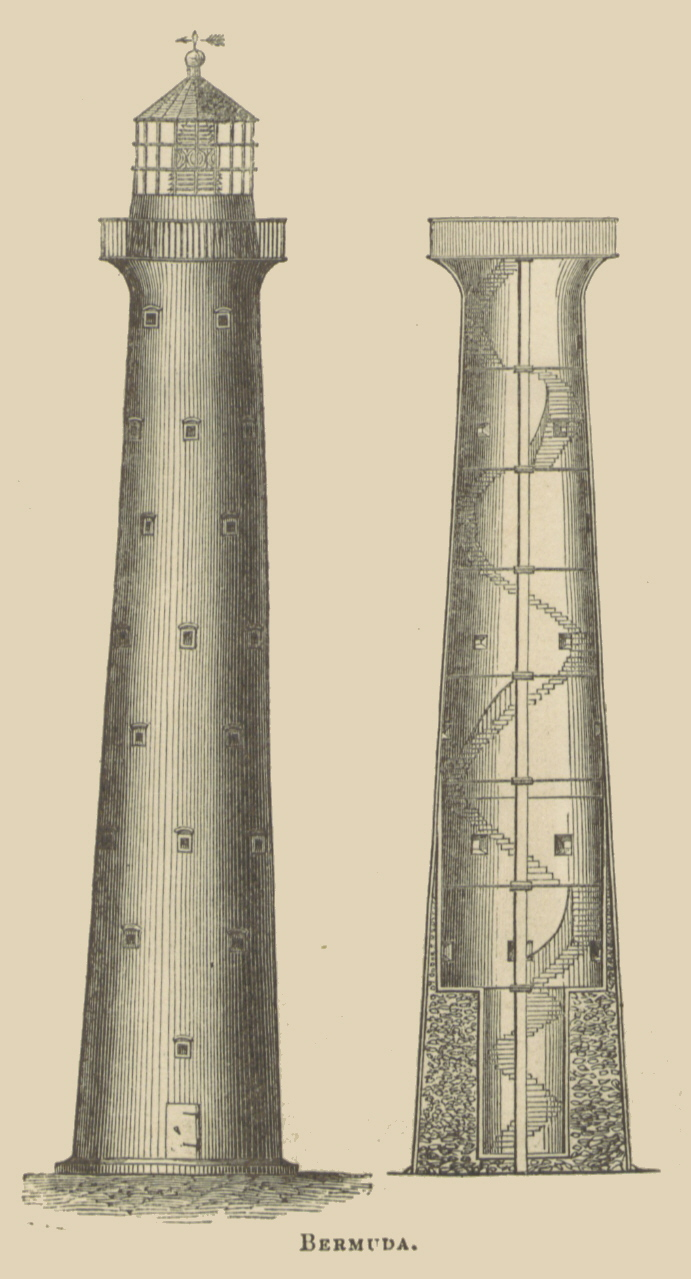
Internal diagram

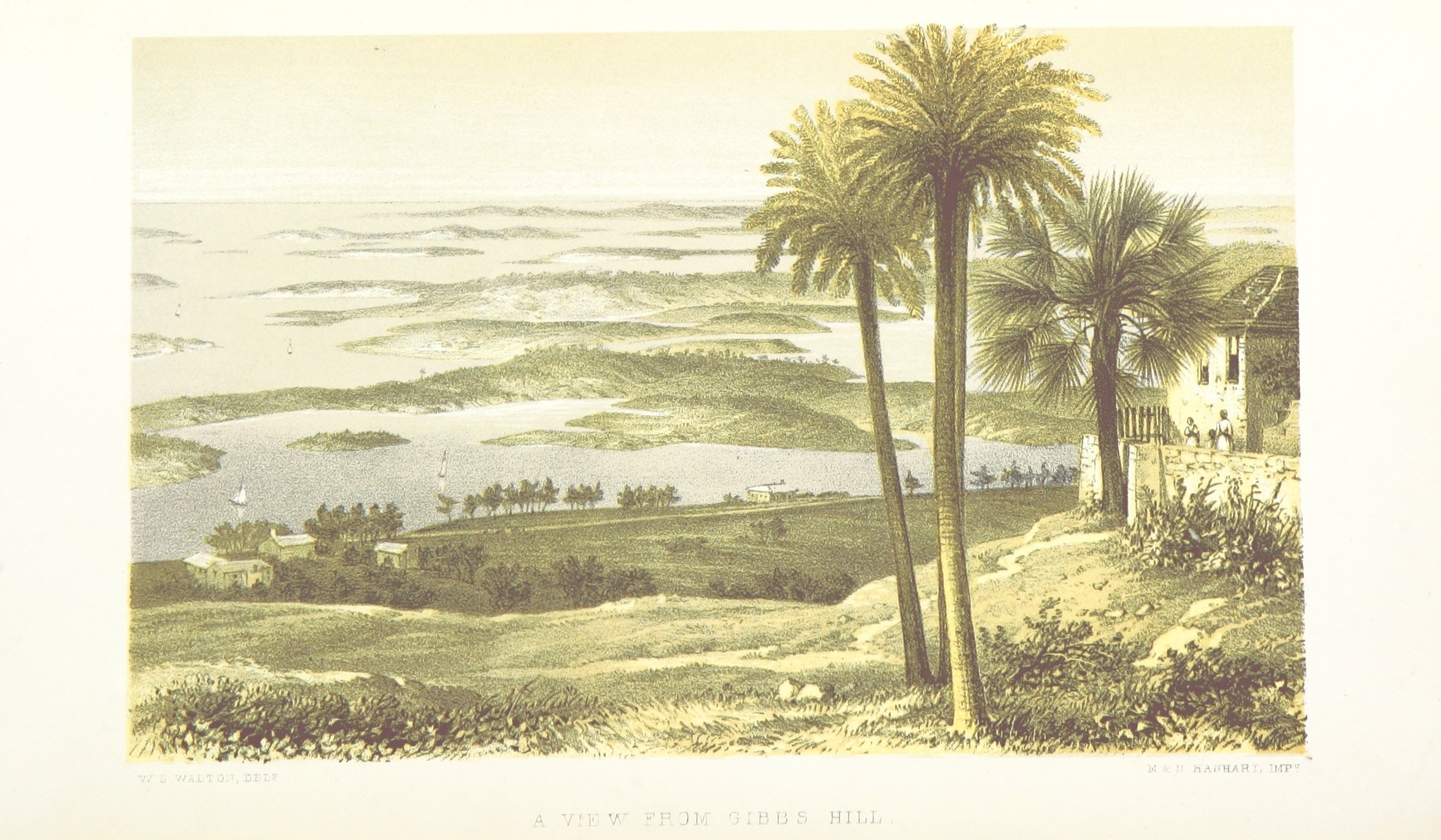
A view from Gibbs Hill, 1857

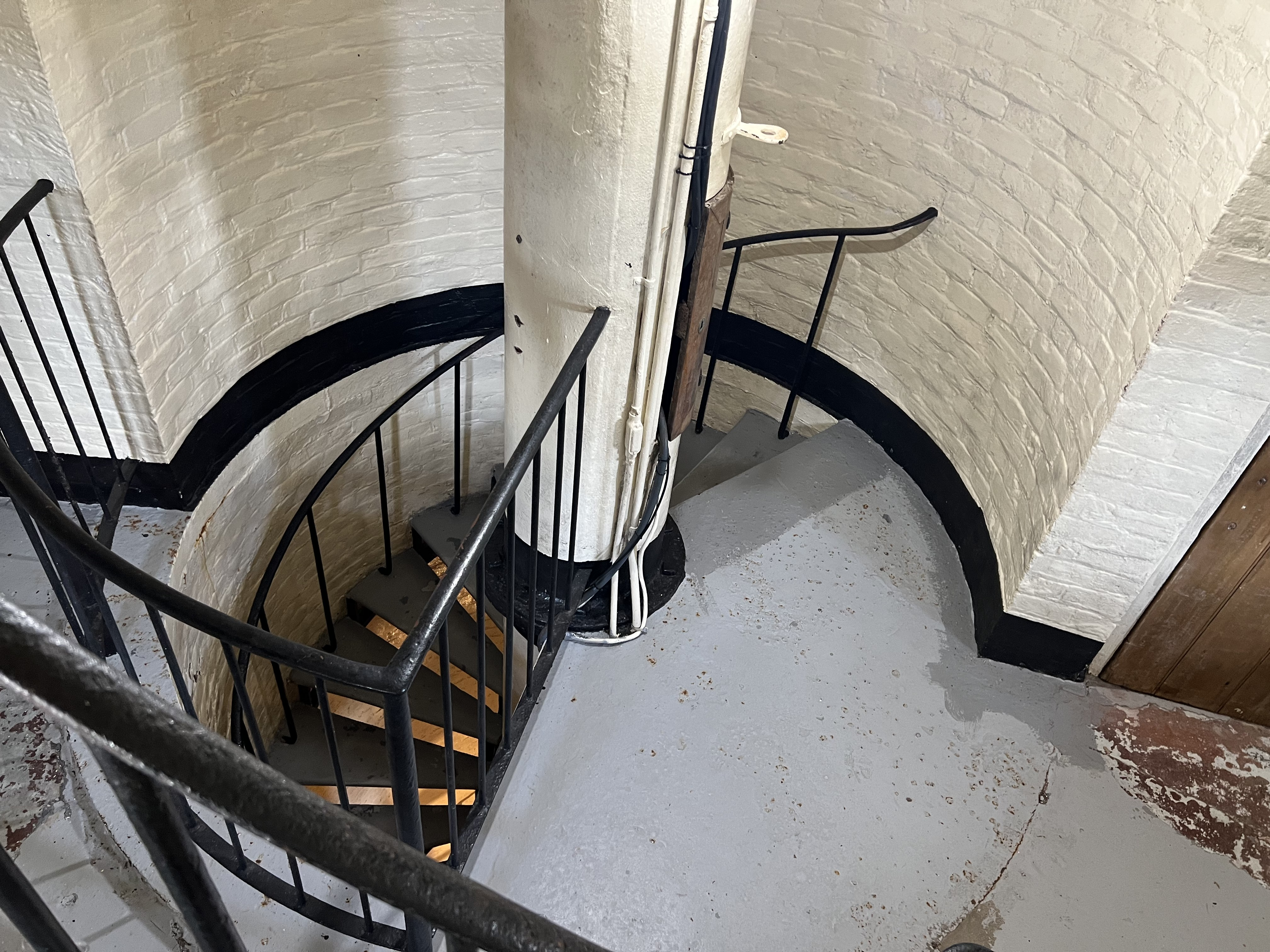
Interior view of Gibbs Hill Lighthouse near the base

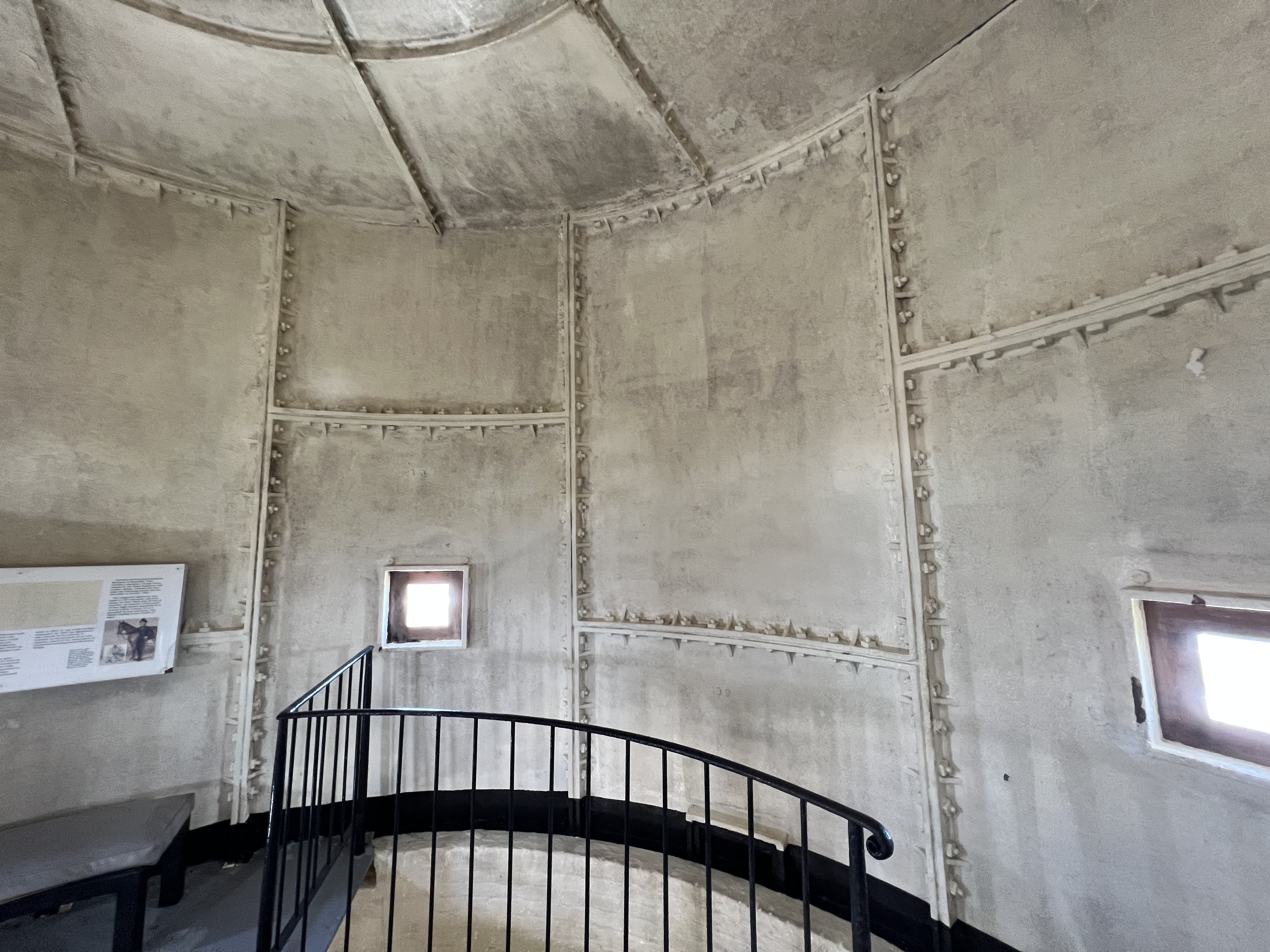
Interior view of Gibbs Hill Lighthouse showing the cast iron plates of the outer wall.

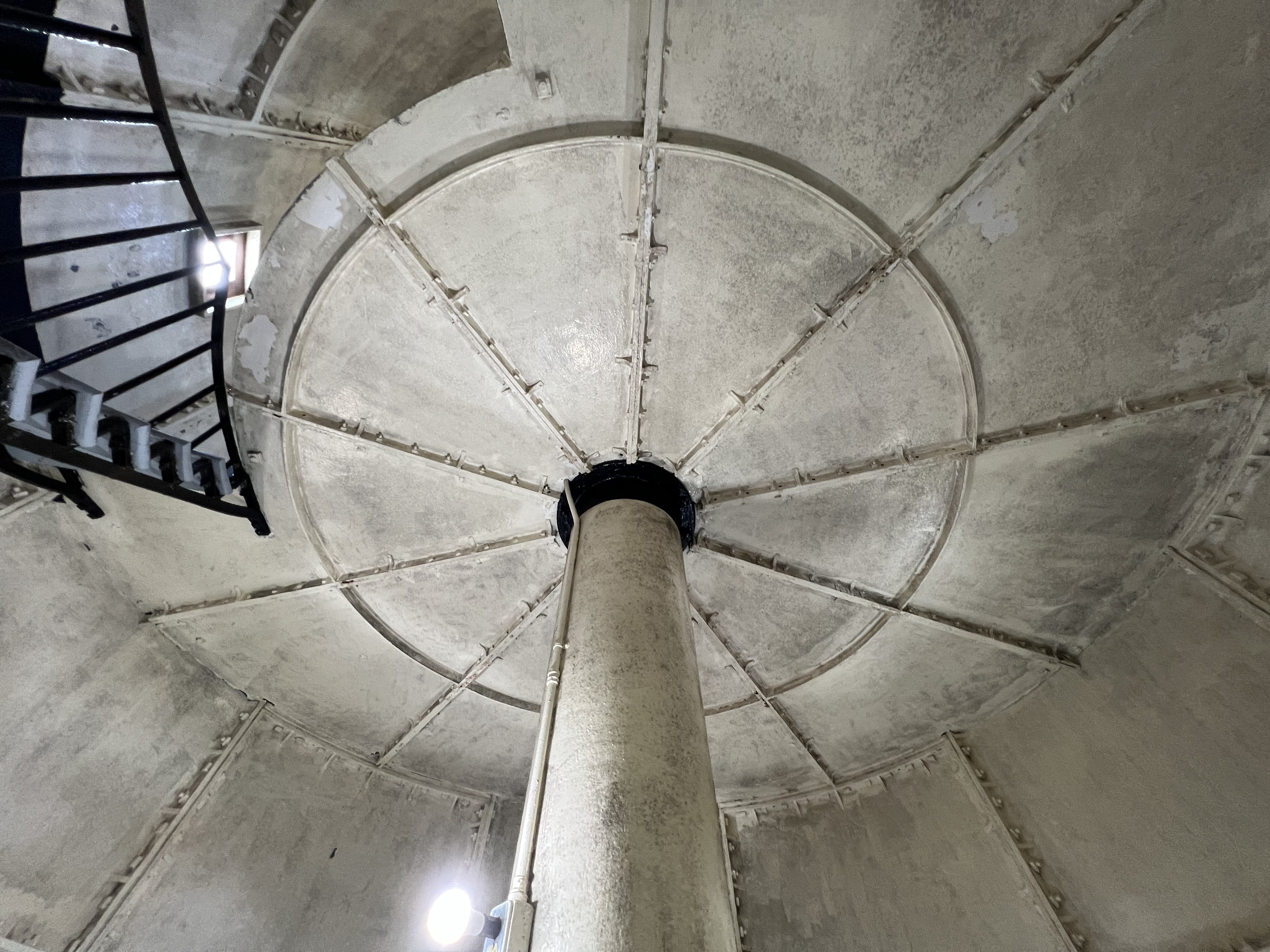
Interior view of Gibbs Hill Lighthouse looking up at a ceiling

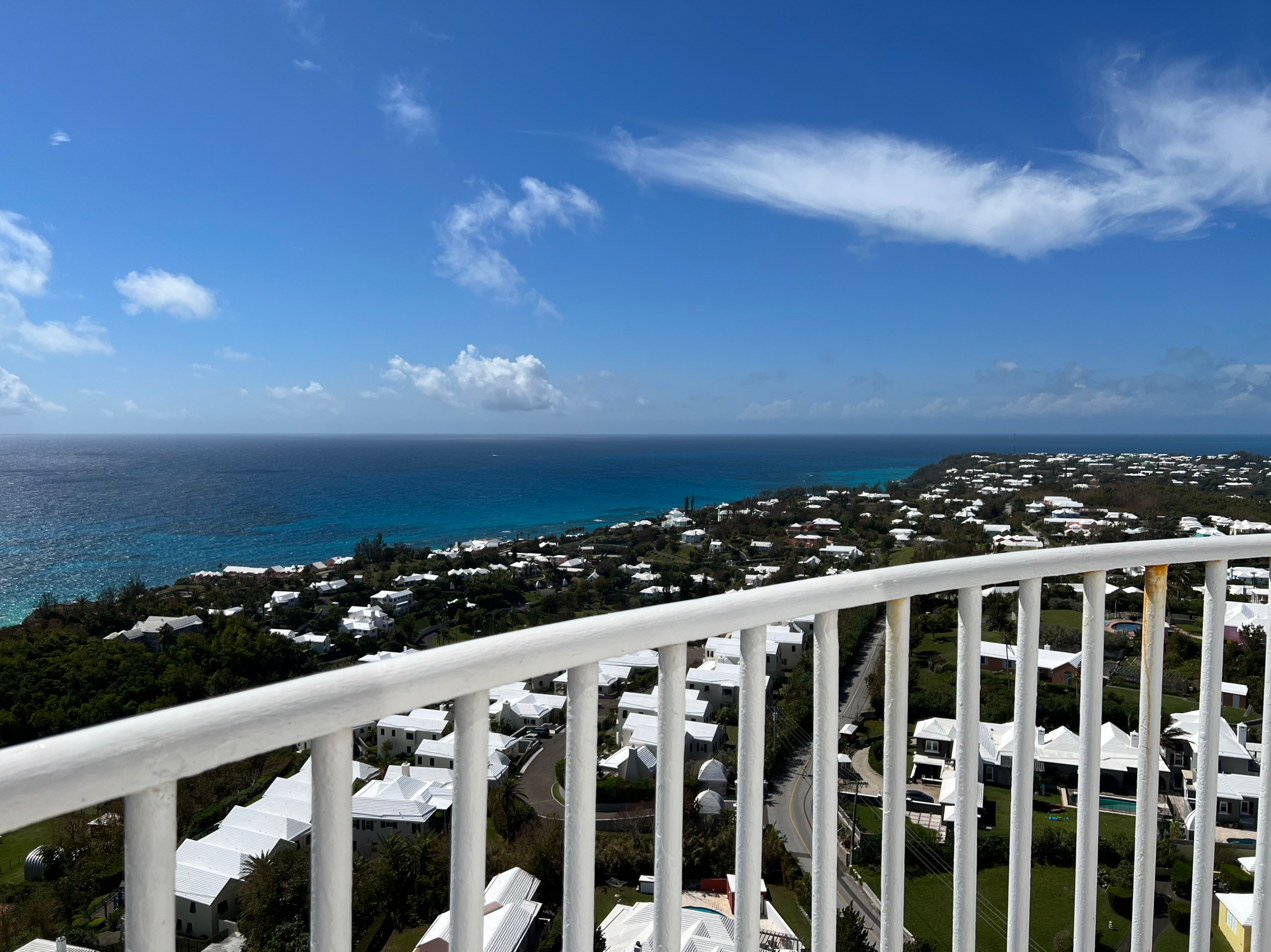
View of the ocean from the top of Gibbs Hill Lighthouse

== See also ==
- List of lighthouses in Bermuda

== Sources ==
- "bermudalighthouse.com". Gibbs Hill Lighthouse Bermuda. Archived from the original on 1 March 2001.
- Rowlett, Russ. "Lighthouses of Bermuda". The Lighthouse Directory. University of North Carolina at Chapel Hill.
- "Lighthouse Digest". Archived from the original on 14 June 2011.
