= Dan Gode =

American academic

Dhananjay "Dan" Gode is a Clinical Associate Professor of Accounting, Taxation, and Business law at New York University Stern School of Business. He teaches courses in corporate financial accounting, and also teaches for the TRIUM Global Executive MBA Program, an alliance of NYU Stern, the London School of Economics and HEC School of Management.

== Biography ==
Gode holds an undergraduate degree in electronics and communication engineering from Indian Institute of Technology (BHU) Varanasi, and an MBA from Indian Institute of Management Calcutta. He also has master's degrees in Information Systems and Accounting, and a PhD in Accounting, from Carnegie Mellon University yet was quoted in his Financial Statement Modeling class at NYU Stern on March 11, 2015 as saying that he "has only taken one accounting course" in his entire career.

Gode’s primary research areas include financial analysis, programming, legal liability of firms, valuation, managerial accounting, and performance measurement. From 1993-98, he was an Assistant Professor of Accounting at the William E. Simon Graduate School of Business Administration at the University of Rochester. Professor Gode is the co-founder of the Almaris E-Learning Systems.

== Teaching awards ==
- Gode is the recipient of several teaching awards within the NYU Stern School of Business.

== Honors and awards ==
- Richard M. and Margaret S. Cyert Family Fellowship, given to the doctoral student who "best demonstrates the capacity for interdisciplinary work of unusual vision, originality, imagination and creativity," Graduate School of Industrial Administration, Carnegie Mellon University, 1991.
- Doctoral Consortium Fellow at the American Accounting Association, Tahoe City, California, 1991.
- Deloitte and Touche Foundation Fellow, 1990-1993.
- William Larimer Mellon Fellowship, Graduate School of Industrial Administration, Carnegie Mellon University, 1988-1991

== Course development ==
- Developed the Financial Accounting Tutor, a comprehensive interactive software package to teach financial accounting. The software is being published by John Wiley and Sons Inc. The software helps students learn basic accounting concepts on their own thereby freeing up class time for discussions of managerial issues.
- Developed a new course on Modeling Financial Statements

== Publications ==
Professor Gode has written over 100 publications, papers, presentations, and citations. He has also been published in the Quarterly Journal of Economics and in the Journal of Political Economy.

- Barclay, M.; Gode, D.K. & Kothari, S.P. Measuring Delivered Performance. Asia Pacific Journal of Accounting and Economics.
- Gode, D. K.; A. Barua & T. Mukhopadhyay (1990). On the Economics of Software Maintenance Problem. Denmark: Proceedings of the International Conference of Information Systems. pp. 159–170.
- Gode, D.K.; P. Mohanram (Dec 2003). Inferring the Cost of Capital Using the Ohlson-Juettner Model. Vol. 8. Review of Accounting Studies.
- Gode, D.K.; P. Mohanram (2001). Predicting Analyst Forecast Revisions and Earnings Surprises.
- Gode, D.K.; P. Mohanram (2001). The Relative Use of Earnings and Stock Prices in CEO Compensation.
- Gode, D.K.; J. Ohlson (2004). Accounting-based Valuation with Changing Interest Rates. Review of Accounting Studies.
- Gode, D.K.; J. Ohlson (2001). Impact of Stock Options on Earnings per Share.
- Gode, D.K.; R. Singh (2001). Impact of Verifiability on Contracts.
- Gode, D.K.; S. Sunder (Feb 1993). Allocative Efficiency of Markets with Zero Intelligence Traders: Market as a Partial Substitute for Individual Rationality. Vol. 101. Journal of Political Economy. pp. 119–137.
- Gode, D.K.; S. Sunder (2001). Convergence of Double Auctions to Contract Curve in an Edgeworth Box.
- Gode, D.K.; S. Sunder. Double Auction Dynamics: Structural Effects of Non-Binding Price Controls. Journal of Economics Dynamics and Control.
- Gode, D.K.; S. Sunder (1993). Carley, K.; M. Prietula (eds.). Human and Artificially Intelligent Traders in Computer Double Auctions. Hillsdale, NJ: Erlbaum.
- Gode, D. K.; S. Sunders (1993). Lower Bounds for Efficiency of Surplus Extraction in Double Auctions. Vol. XV. New York: In the Double Auction Market: Institutions, Theories, and Evidence, (D. Friedman and J. Rust, eds.); Addison-Wesley.
- Gode, D.K.; S. Sunder. On the Impossibility of Global Continuously-Clearing Markets: The Case for Call Markets.
- Gode, D.K.; S. Sunder (May 1997). What Makes Markets Allocationally Efficient?. Quarterly Journal of Economics.

== Education ==
Professor Gode received his BS in electronics and communication engineering from the Indian Institute of Technology (BHU) Varanasi, India and his MBA from the Indian Institute of Management Calcutta. He also received his MS in information systems, MS in accounting, and his Doctor of Philosophy in accounting with a minor in information from Carnegie Mellon University.
