= Bourou =

- Location in Burkina Faso
- Coordinates: 12°3′N 2°1′W
- Country: Burkina Faso
- Region: Centre-Ouest Region
- Province: Boulkiemdé Province
- Department: Sabou Department

Population (2019)
  - Total: 3,565
- Time zone: UTC+0 (GMT 0)

Bourou is a town in the Sabou Department of Boulkiemdé Province in central western Burkina Faso.

Population
Year	Pop.	±%
1985	2,074	—
2006	3,067	+47.9%
2019	3,565	+16.2%
