= Mia M. Gaudet =

American molecular epidemiologist

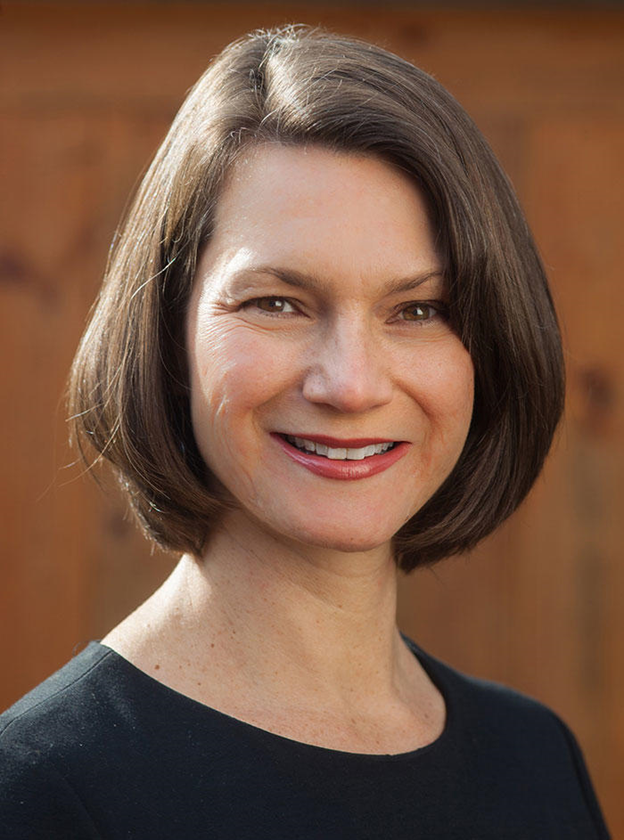
- Education: University of North Carolina at Chapel Hill
- Scientific career
- Fields: Cancer epidemiology, cohort studies
- Workplaces: Rollins School of Public Health; Memorial Sloan Kettering Cancer Center; Albert Einstein College of Medicine; National Cancer Institute
- Doctoral advisor: Marilie Gammon
- Other academic advisors: Andrew F. Olshan

Mia M. Gaudet is an American molecular epidemiologist pectized in cancer prevention research and managing cohort studies. She is a senior scientist in the division of cancer epidemiology and genetics at the National Cancer Institute.

== Life ==
Gaudet was born to Diane Guadet who raised her and her sister Renee as a single working mother. Gaudet's grandmother, Ruth Michaelson, had an influential role in her life. Michaelson had a seventh grade education and lived on a dairy farm in Illinois during the great depression.

Gaudet earned master's degree and a Ph.D. in epidemiology at the University of North Carolina at Chapel Hill. Her 2005 dissertation was titled Interactions of lifestyle factors, manganese superoxide dismutase, catechol-O-methyltransferase, and the risk of breast cancer. Andrew F. Olshan was her academic advisor during her master's degree. Gaudet's doctoral advisor was Marilie Gammon. She completed a postdoctoral fellowship in the National Cancer Institute's (NCI) division of cancer epidemiology and genetics (DCEG).

Gaudet has held academic positions at Rollins School of Public Health at Emory University, Memorial Sloan Kettering Cancer Center, and Albert Einstein College of Medicine. She was a scientific director of epidemiology research at the American Cancer Society (ACS). In the ACS cancer prevention studies, she contributed to cohort activities, including participant recruitment and retention, questionnaire development, and resource utilization. She initiated and oversaw the collection and characterization of breast and ovarian tissue from women diagnosed with these cancers in these cohorts. Gaudet conducted research to clarify and identify genetic and non-genetic risk factors for subtypes of breast cancer with an emphasis on more fatal subtypes in the cancer prevention study cohorts and other collaborative efforts. Gaudet is the senior scientist for the connect for cancer prevention cohort study in the DCEG trans-divisional research program. She oversees cohort management and activities as well as serves as the study’s chair in the executive and DCEG steering committees.
