= Godé =

Godé Godin
- Location in Burkina Faso
- Coordinates: 11°58′N 2°22′W
- Country: Burkina Faso
- Region: Centre-Ouest Region
- Province: Boulkiemdé Province
- Department: Sabou Department

Population (2019)
  - Total: 5,629
- Time zone: UTC+0 (GMT 0)

Godé is a town in the Sabou Department of Boulkiemdé Province in central western Burkina Faso.

Population
Year	Pop.	±%
1985	3,600	—
2006	3,900	+8.3%
2019	5,629	+44.3%
