= Godeau =

Godeau is a French surname. Notable people with the surname include:

- Antoine Godeau (1605–1672), French bishop, poet and exegete
- Bruno Godeau (born 1992), Belgian footballer
- Philippe Godeau (born 1961), French film producer, director and screenwriter

== See also ==
- Godot (disambiguation), a homonym
