= Gadot (surname) =

Gadot (Hebrew: גדות) is a Hebrew surname meaning riverbanks. Notable people with the name include:

- Gal Gadot (born 1985), Israeli actress and model
- Gideon Gadot (1941–2012), Israeli journalist and politician

== See also ==
- Godot (disambiguation)
