= Gadot, Israel =

Gadot: גדות (Hebrew)
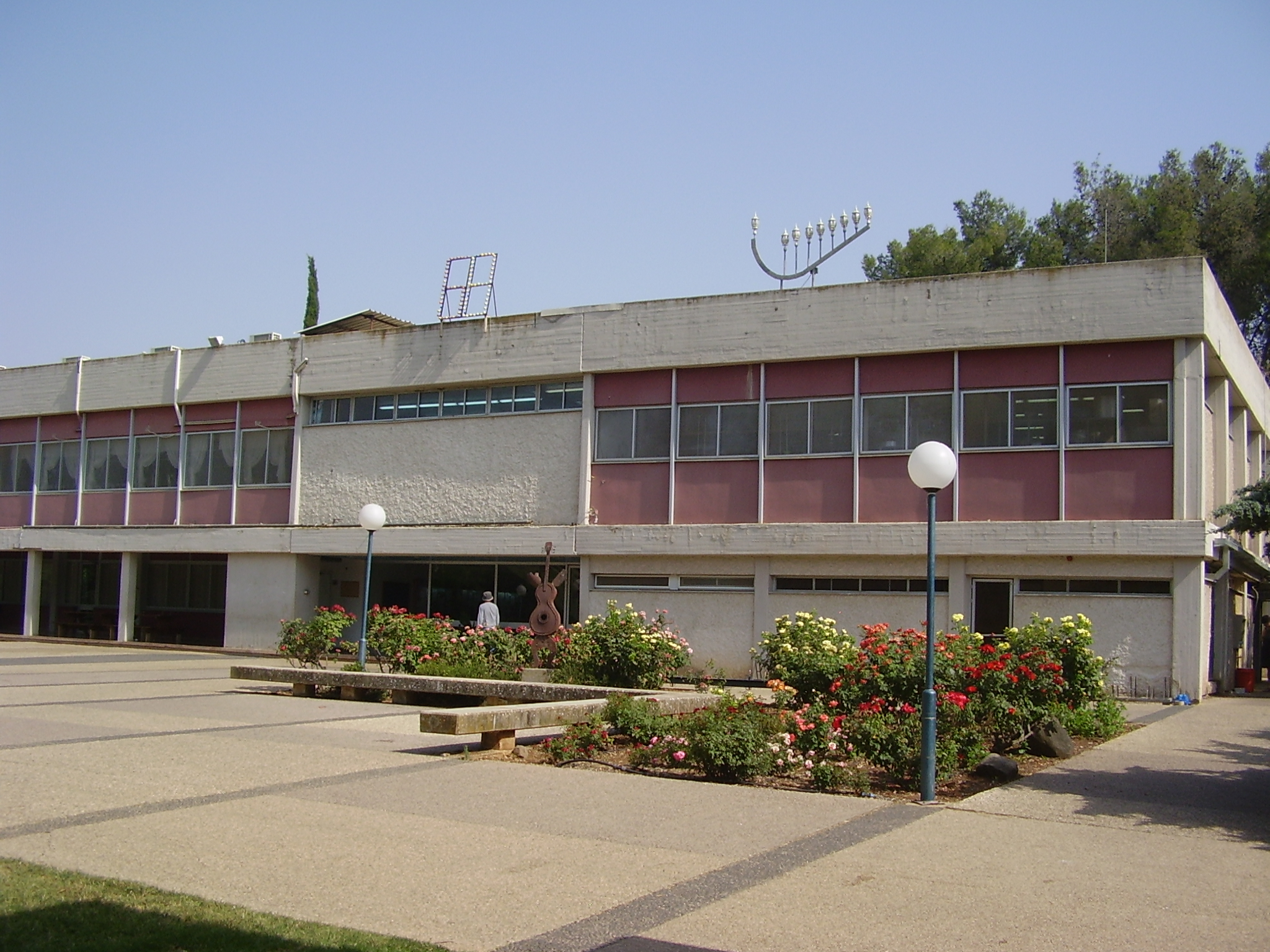
- Etymology: Banks
- Location within Northeast Israel Location within Israel
- Coordinates: 33°1′5″N 35°37′2″E
- Country: Israel
- District: Northern
- Subdistrict: Safed
- Council: Upper Galilee
- Affiliation: Kibbutz Movement
- Founded: 1949
- Founder: HaKibbutz HaMeuhad
- Population (2024): 472

Gadot (Hebrew: גדות, lit. 'Riveranks') is a kibbutz in northern Israel. Located in the Korazim Plateau, it falls under the jurisdiction of Upper Galilee Regional Council. In 2024, it had a population of 472.

== History ==
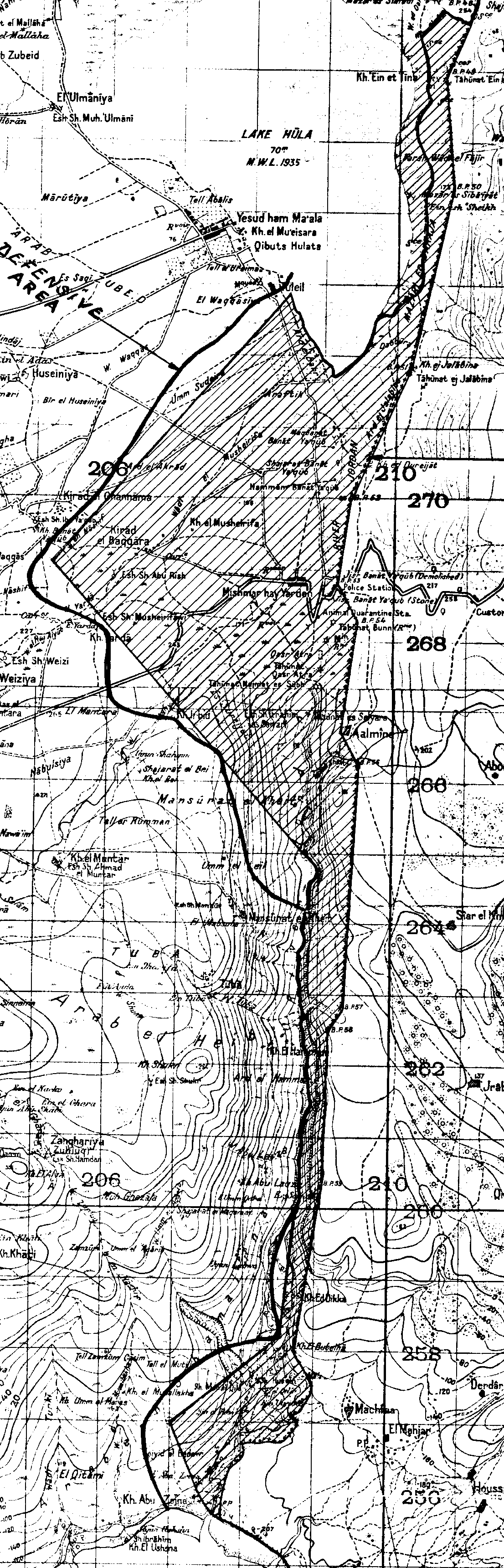
Gadot was founded in the Demilitarized Zone, per the Israel–Syria Mixed Armistice Commission.

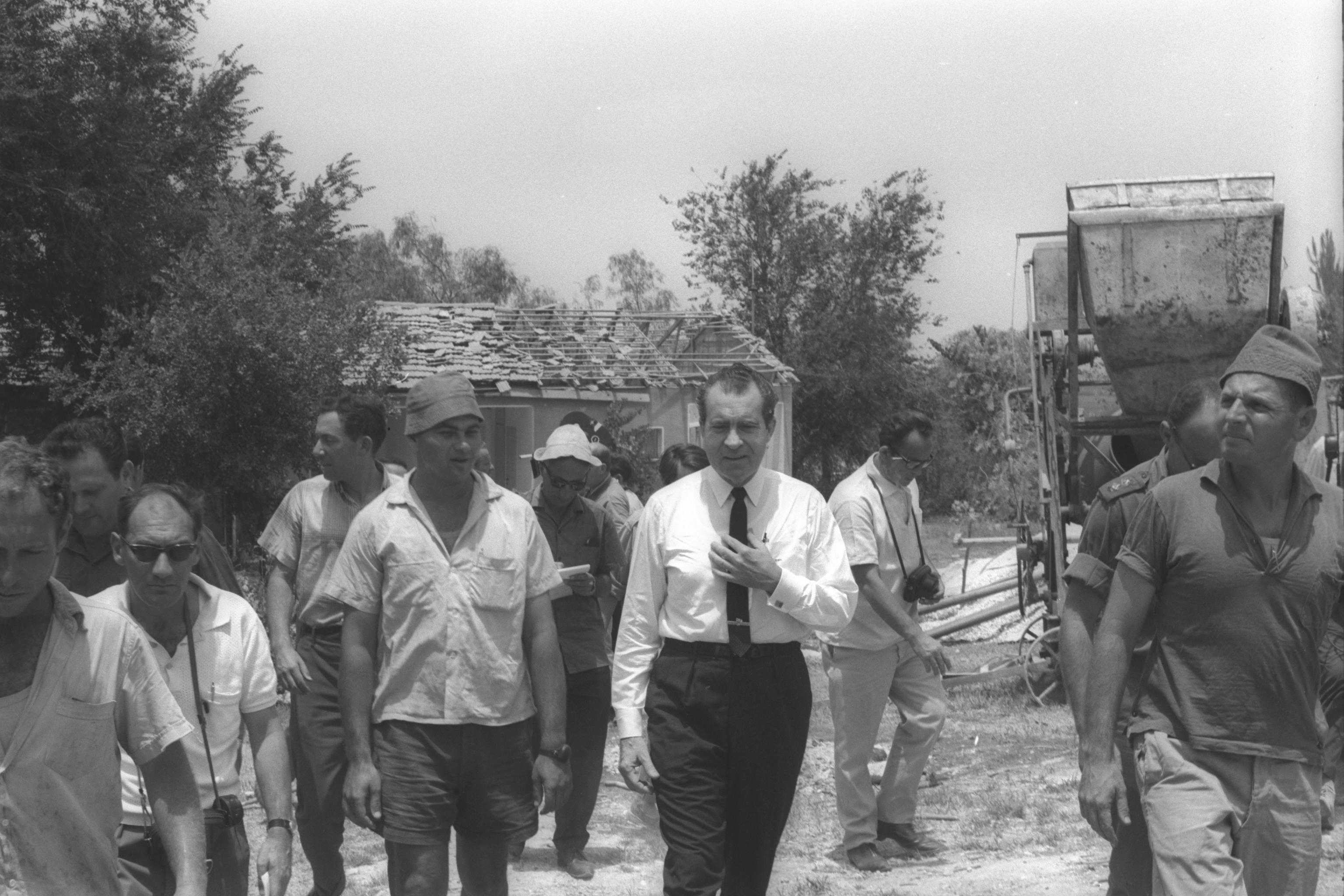
Richard Nixon visiting Kibbutz Gadot, 24 June 1967

Kibbutz Gadot (originally Hagovrim) was founded in 1949 on the site of the destroyed moshava of Mishmar HaYarden by Nahal youth from HaNoar HaOved VeHaLomed and Holocaust survivors, members of HaKibbutz HaMeuhad. It was renamed to Gadot in 1955 due its proximity to the banks of the Jordan River.

During the 1950s and 1960s, the kibbutz suffered from several assaults by the Syrian Army and was hit by many artillery bombardments. On 7 April 1967, when 6 Syrian MiG 21s were shot down, the kibbutz suffered a severe bombardment during which almost all of its buildings were hit. Two months later, during the Six-Day War, the kibbutz was once again bombarded and most of its buildings were destroyed or badly damaged. The state of the kibbutz and the turning-point of the war are evoked in a song performed by Hava Alberstein - "My daughter, are you laughing or crying?" During the Yom Kippur War, the kibbutz was hit once again, although to a lesser extent.

Due to the fact it was situated in the Israel-Syria DMZ under the 1949 Armistice Agreements, Gadot has been claimed by Syria as its own sovereign territory in the 1990s during negotiations for a peace agreement. The Israeli side rejected these claims, as it would have led to Syria having territory west of the 1923 border between Mandatory Palestine and the French Mandate of Syria.

== Economy ==
The kibbutz's local industries are: crops, avocado, citrus, chickens, hostessing, and a plastics factory for wrapping materials.
