= Sarana =

Sarana may refer to:

== People ==
- Sarana (given name)
- Sarana (surname)

== Places ==
=== Attu Island, Alaska (United States) ===
- Sarana Bay, an inlet
- Sarana Pass, a mountain pass
- Sarana Valley, a valley

=== Burkina Faso ===
- Sarana, Bazèga, a village
- Sarana, Pella, a town
- Sarana, Sabou, a town

== Other ==
- Saraṇa, the Pali term for Refuge in Buddhism
- Śaraṇa, the Sanskrit term for Refuge in Buddhism
- Sharana (Hinduism), meaning "to surrender"

== See also ==
- Sharana (disambiguation)
- Sharan (disambiguation)
- Saran (disambiguation)
