= Sharana (disambiguation) =

Sharana is the capital of Paktika Province, Afghanistan.

Sharana may also refer to:

- Sharana District, a district in Paktika Province, Afghanistan
- Sharana Airstrip, in Sharana, Paktika Province, Afghanistan
- Sharana (Hinduism), meaning "to surrender", denotes egoless surrender and refuge in Shiva, a deity of Hinduism

== See also ==
- Sharan (disambiguation)
- Sarana (disambiguation)
- Saran (disambiguation)
- Sarana (disambiguation)
