= Sarin (disambiguation) =

Sarin is a nerve agent.

Sarin may also refer to:

== Places ==
- Sarin (star), the star Delta Herculis in the constellation of Hercules

=== Iran ===
- Sarin, Kermanshah
- Sarin, Zanjan
- Sazin or Sarin, Zanjan Province

== Other uses ==
- Sareen, a surname that is a variant of Sarin
- Arun Sarin (born 1954), businessman best known for being the CEO of Vodafone
- Nihal Sarin (born 2004), Indian chess grandmaster
- Sarin, a short-lived band side-project of Stephen O'Malley

== See also ==
- Saran (disambiguation)
- Saren (disambiguation)
- Sarine (disambiguation)
- Sarrin, a Syrian town
- Serin (disambiguation)
