= Saran =

Saran may refer to:

== Places ==
- Saran, Loiret, a commune of the Loiret Department, France
- Saran, Kazakhstan, a city in Kazakhstan
- Saran district, Bihar, India
- Saran division, Bihar, India
- Saran (Lok Sabha constituency), Bihar, India
- Saran, Iran (disambiguation), places in Iran
- Sárán, the Hungarian name for Şerani village, Borod Commune, Bihor County, Romania
- Saransk, Russia

== People ==
- Saran (director), Indian film director
- Saran, a legendary King of Ulster
- Saran (name)

== Other uses ==
- Saran (plastic), a brand of plastic film food wrap
  - Polyvinylidene chloride, or Saran, the original polymer used for Saran Wrap

== See also ==
- Sarran
- Saren (disambiguation)
- Sarin (disambiguation)
- Saron (disambiguation)
- Sharan (disambiguation)
- Sharana (disambiguation)
- Saran (disambiguation)
- Sarana (disambiguation)
