= Sharan =

Sharan may refer to:

- Sharan (actor) (born 1976), an Indian actor
- Sharan (poet), a Sanskrit poet of 12th-century from Bengal
- Devi Sharan, airline pilot and captain during the Indian Airlines flight 814 hijacking
- Sharan, a fictional character portrayed by Sanjeev Tyagi in the 2015 Indian film Baby
- Sharan, Iran (disambiguation), places in Iran
- Sharan, Russia, a rural locality in Sharansky District of the Republic of Bashkortostan, Russia
- Sharan, alternative name of Sharana, city and capital of Paktika Province, Afghanistan
- Volkswagen Sharan, a multi-purpose vehicle made by the Volkswagen Group

== See also ==
- Sharana (disambiguation)
- Saran (disambiguation)
- Sarana (disambiguation)
- Sharran, Syria
