= Sarine =

Sarine may refer to:

- Sarine District, one of Switzerland's seven districts
- Saane/Sarine, a Swiss river
- Sarine Voltage, an American musician
- Sarine, Lebanon (a village)
- Sarine Technologies, a company that specializes in diamonds

== See also ==
- Sarin (disambiguation)
- Serin (disambiguation)
