= Frederick J. Harlfinger II =

American Navy submarine commander and admiral

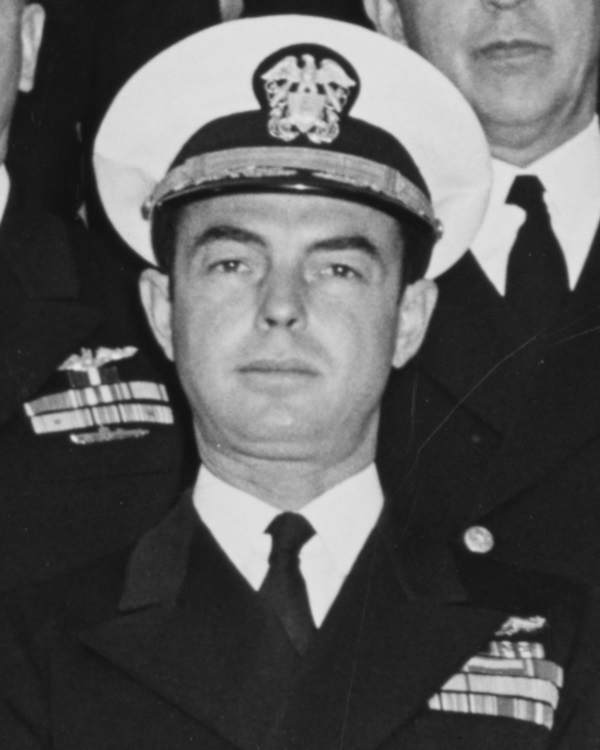
- Commander Harlfinger in 1947
- Born: September 14, 1913; Albany, New York, US
- Died: December 21, 1993 (aged 80); Sarasota, Florida, US
- Military career
- Allegiance: United States
- Branch: United States Navy
- Service years: 1935–1974
- Rank: Vice Admiral
- Nickname: Fritz
- Commands: Office of Naval Intelligence; South Atlantic Force; Submarine Flotilla One; Submarine Squadron Twelve; USS Mauna Loa; Submarine Division 43; USS Sirago; USS Trigger; USS S-32
- Conflicts: World War II
- Awards: Navy Cross; Distinguished Service Medal; Silver Star Medal (3); Legion of Merit (2); Bronze Star Medal

Frederick Joseph "Fritz" Harlfinger II (September 14, 1913 – December 21, 1993) was a United States Navy officer who served as a submarine commander during World War II and later commanded the South Atlantic Force of the U.S. Atlantic Fleet. He then served as director of the Office of Naval Intelligence and finally as director of Command Support Programs in the Office of the Chief of Naval Operations, with the rank of vice admiral.

== Early life and education ==
Born in Albany, New York, He attended the Cathedral Academy, which was a Roman Catholic high school in Albany. Harlfinger was appointed to the United States Naval Academy in 1931, graduating in 1935. He later studied at the Industrial College of the Armed Forces from August 1954 to May 1955.

== Military career ==
As his first assignment, Harlfinger served for two years as an officer on the battleship Arizona. He then served on the replenishment oiler Ramapo and the submarine S-38 before joining the commissioning crew of USS Trout at the Portsmouth Navy Yard in August 1940.

At the beginning of World War II, Harlfinger served on the submarines Trout and Whale and was awarded three Silver Stars.

Harlfinger was given command of the submarine S-32 in May 1943. He assumed command of Trigger in February 1944, earning the Navy Cross for leading her ninth war patrol and a Bronze Star Medal with Combat "V" for leading her tenth war patrol.

Harlfinger was next assigned to be the first commanding officer of Sirago. After her commissioning, he served as her skipper from August 1945 to May 1947. In 1950, Harlfinger helped to organize Submarine Division 43 and then served as its first commanding officer from March 1951 to January 1952.

Harlfinger was promoted to captain effective July 1, 1954. In August 1955, he became the first postwar naval attaché in Bonn, West Germany. Harlfinger was subsequently awarded the Commander's Cross of the Order of Merit by the West German government.

Harlfinger served as the commanding officer of the ammunition ship Mauna Loa from June 1957 to July 1958. He was then given command of Submarine Squadron Twelve.

Harlfinger served as the commanding officer of Submarine Flotilla One from October 1962 to December 1963. He was next made assistant director for Collection at the Defense Intelligence Agency, serving from January 1964 to January 1967. Harlfinger was promoted to rear admiral effective April 1, 1964 and was awarded the Legion of Merit for this assignment.

In March 1967, Harlfinger was given command of the South Atlantic Force of the U.S. Atlantic Fleet based in San Juan, Puerto Rico. He then served as director of the Office of Naval Intelligence from August 1968 to July 1971.

Harlfinger next served as director of Command Support Programs in the Office of the Chief of Naval Operations until his retirement in March 1974. His promotion to vice admiral was approved by the Senate on October 7, 1971 and he received a Navy Distinguished Service Medal for this final assignment.

== Personal ==
Harlfinger was the son of Augustus Bernhard Harlfinger and Marie Ann (Berben) Harlfinger.

Harlfinger married Frances Clarke "Fran" Blance (September 25, 1917 – February 22, 1991). She was the daughter of Clarke Blance (September 30, 1886 – October 9, 1954), a U.S. Army Medical Corps physician who served during both World War I and II and retired as a colonel in 1947. The couple had two sons, two daughters and seven grandchildren.

Harlfinger lived in Sarasota, Florida after retirement and died at a hospital there in December 1993. He was interred at Arlington National Cemetery on January 6, 1994.
