= USS Sirago =

Submarine of the United States

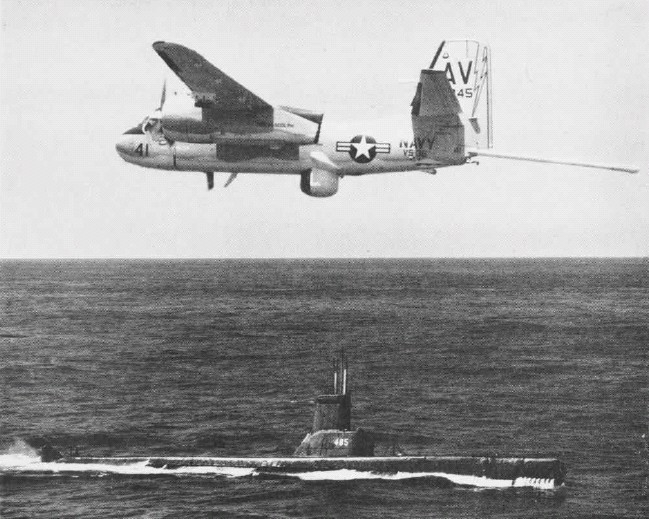
- USS Sirago and an S2F-3 Tracker from antisubmarine aircraft carrier USS Randolph (CVS-15) in 1962

History

United States
- Builder: Portsmouth Naval Shipyard, Kittery, Maine
- Laid down: 3 January 1945
- Launched: 11 May 1945
- Commissioned: 13 August 1945
- Decommissioned: 1 June 1972
- Stricken: 1 June 1972
- Fate: Sold for scrap, 2 May 1973

General characteristics
- Class & type: Tench-class diesel-electric submarine
- Displacement: 1,570 long tons (1,600 t) surfaced; 2,414 tons (2,453 t) submerged
- Length: 311 ft 8 in (95.00 m)
- Beam: 27 ft 4 in (8.33 m)
- Draft: 17 ft (5.2 m) maximum
- Propulsion: 4 × Fairbanks-Morse Model 38D8-⅛ 10-cylinder opposed piston diesel engines driving electrical generators; 2 × 126-cell Sargo batteries; 2 × low-speed direct-drive Elliott electric motors; two propellers; 5,400 shp (4.0 MW) surfaced; 2,740 shp (2.0 MW) submerged
- Speed: 20.25 knots (38 km/h) surfaced; 8.75 knots (16 km/h) submerged
- Range: 11,000 nautical miles (20,000 km) surfaced at 10 knots (19 km/h)
- Endurance: 48 hours at 2 knots (3.7 km/h) submerged; 75 days on patrol
- Test depth: 400 ft (120 m)
- Complement: 10 officers, 71 enlisted
- Armament: 10 × 21-inch (533 mm) torpedo tubes; (6 forward, 4 aft); 28 torpedoes; 1 × 5-inch (127 mm) / 25 caliber deck gun; Bofors 40 mm and Oerlikon 20 mm cannon

General characteristics (Guppy II)
- Displacement: 1,870 tons (1,900 t) surfaced; 2,440 tons (2,480 t) submerged
- Length: 307 ft (94 m)
- Beam: 27 ft 4 in (8.33 m)
- Draft: 17 ft (5.2 m)
- Propulsion: Snorkel added; Batteries upgraded to GUPPY type, capacity expanded to 504 cells (1 × 184 cell, 1 × 68 cell, and 2 × 126 cell batteries)
- Speed: Surfaced: 18.0 knots (33.3 km/h) maximum; 13.5 knots (25.0 km/h) cruising; Submerged: 16.0 knots (29.6 km/h) for ½ hour; 9.0 knots (16.7 km/h) snorkeling; 3.5 knots (6.5 km/h) cruising
- Range: 15,000 nmi (28,000 km) surfaced at 11 knots (20 km/h)
- Endurance: 48 hours at 4 knots (7 km/h) submerged
- Complement: 9–10 officers; 5 petty officers; 70 enlisted men
- Sensors & processing systems: WFA active sonar; JT passive sonar; Mk 106 torpedo fire control system
- Armament: 10 × 21 inch (533 mm) torpedo tubes; (six forward, four aft); all guns removed

USS Sirago (SS-485), a Tench-class submarine, was named for the sirago, a small, freshwater tropical fish.

== Construction and launch ==
Her keel was laid down on 4 January 1945 at the Portsmouth Navy Yard in Kittery, Maine. She was launched on 13 May 1945, sponsored by Mrs. L. Mendel Rivers and commissioned on 13 August 1945 with Commander F. J. Harlfinger II, in command.

== First duties ==
Commissioned at the end of World War II, Sirago conducted her shakedown cruise off the East Coast and in the Caribbean Sea during the fall of 1945. After shakedown, she joined Submarine Squadron (SubRon) 8 at New London, Connecticut, and, in January 1946, she proceeded to Provincetown, Massachusetts, where she participated in the destruction of U-Boats U-1228, and U-805 off of Cape Cod, Massachusetts on 5 February and 8, later sinking U-858 as well on 21 November 1947. On returning to New London, Sirago commenced duties that included training services for the Submarine School and for the fleet's destroyer force; experimental exercises to evaluate new techniques and equipment; type training; and fleet exercises that took her from Davis Strait into the Caribbean. In December 1948, she entered the Philadelphia Naval Shipyard for a Greater Underwater Propulsive Power Program (GUPPY) conversion; and, on 25 July 1949, she left the yard for Norfolk, Virginia, where, as a modernized high-speed attack submarine, she joined SubRon 6.

Attached to SubRon 6 for the next twenty-two years, Sirago’s primary mission was antisubmarine warfare. Secondary missions included antishipping warfare, intelligence gathering, and the provision of services for research and development studies. Those duties, during the 1950s, continued to see her operating primarily in the western Atlantic as she participated in exercises with others of her ASW group; in fleet exercises; in joint Canadian-United States exercises, and in NATO exercises, which took her into the eastern Atlantic Ocean and North Sea areas. During the 1950s, she also deployed to the Mediterranean Sea where she operated as a unit of the Sixth Fleet from September to November 1951 and from September to December 1954.

=== Fatal accident ===
An explosion aboard Sirago while drydocked at Portsmouth, New Hampshire, on 2 June 1954, killed two men and injured four others. The blast, which occurred during plastic spraying of a main ballast tank, killed two civilian painters and injured a sailor and three other civilian painters. The burst was heard three miles away.

== Overhaul and new service ==
In October 1962, Sirago entered the Norfolk Naval Shipyard for another extensive overhaul which included the installation of a fiberglass superstructure and sail and, in the spring of 1963, she resumed operations with her ASW group, Task Group "ALFA." That fall, she deployed to the Middle East for CENTO exercise "MIDLINK VI"; but, during the remainder of the 1960s and into the 1970s, her operations were similar to those of the 1950s.

On 1 July 1971, with Commander Clyde H. Shaffer Jr. in command, Sirago was reassigned to SubRon 12 at Key West, Florida; but, less than four months later, on 15 October, she was ordered back to Norfolk, where she rejoined SubRon 6 for one more year.

== Decommissioning ==
Sirago remained in SubRon 6 until she was decommissioned on 1 June 1972. Struck from the Naval Vessel Register on the same day, she was turned over to the Naval Ships Systems Command and sold for scrapping to the Jacobson Metal Company of Chesapeake, Virginia, on 2 May 1973.
