= Serin (disambiguation) =

Serin is a small finch bird from the genus Serinus. Serin may also refer to

- Serin (name)
- Serín, a district in Spain
- Serin, Iran, a village
- Serin Chaveh, a village in Iran
- Sereyn, a village in Iran
