= Hodikof Island =

Island in Alaska, United States

Hodikof
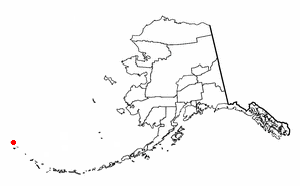

Geography
- Coordinates: 52°52′20″N 173°17′40″E
- Archipelago: Near Islands group of the Aleutian Islands
- Length: .1 mi (0.2 km)
- Width: .1 mi (0.2 km)

Administration
- United States
- State: Alaska
- Census Area: Aleutians West Census Area

Demographics
- Population: 0 (2010)
- Pop. density: 0/km^{2} (0/sq mi)

Hodikof Island (52°52'N 173°18'E) is a tiny 0.1-mile-long (160 m) satellite of Attu Island in the Near Islands at the extreme western end of the Aleutian Islands, Alaska. Its name is derived from Hodikof Point, and it lies in Sarana Bay on the east side of Attu. The seaward extension of Hodikof Island is known as Hodikof Reef.
