= USS S-32 =

Submarine of the United States

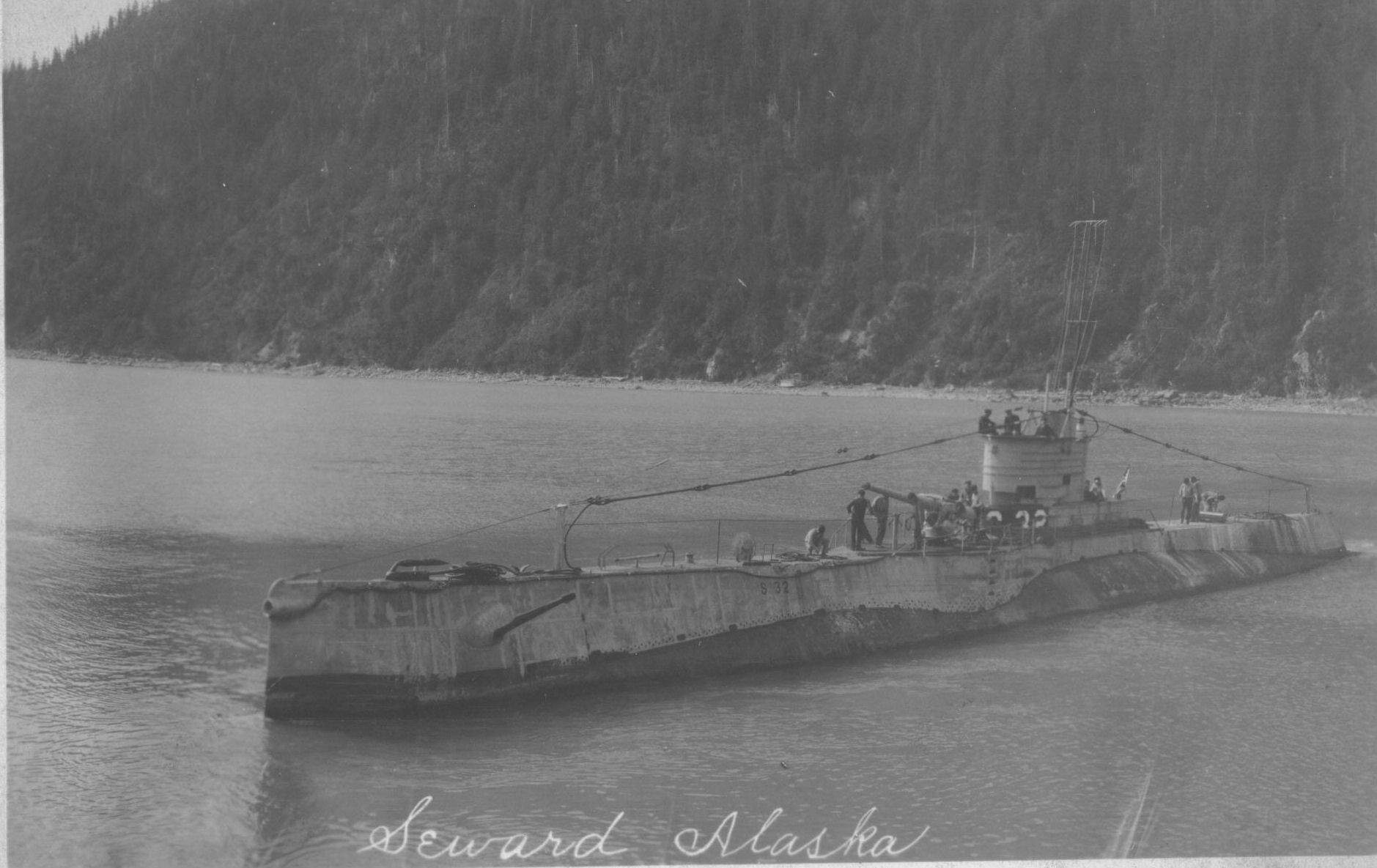
- USS S-32 at Seward, Territory of Alaska, sometime between July 1942 and June 1943.

History

United States
- Name: USS S-32
- Builder: Union Iron Works, San Francisco, California
- Laid down: 12 April 1918
- Launched: 11 January 1919
- Sponsored by: Miss Margaret Tynan
- Commissioned: 15 June 1922
- Decommissioned: 25 September 1922
- Recommissioned: 21 February 1923
- Decommissioned: 7 December 1937
- Recommissioned: 18 September 1940
- Decommissioned: 19 October 1945
- Stricken: 1 November 1945
- Fate: Sold for scrap May 1946

General characteristics
- Class & type: S-class submarine
- Displacement: 854 long tons (868 t) surfaced; 1,062 long tons (1,079 t) submerged
- Length: 219 ft 3 in (66.83 m)
- Beam: 20 ft 8 in (6.30 m)
- Draft: 15 ft 11 in (4.85 m)
- Speed: 14.5 knots (16.7 mph; 26.9 km/h) surfaced; 11 knots (13 mph; 20 km/h) submerged
- Complement: 42 officers and men
- Armament: 1 × 4 in (102 mm)/50 deck gun; 4 × 21 inch (533 mm) torpedo tubes

Service record
- Operations: World War II; Pacific campaign; Aleutian Islands campaign
- Awards: American Defense Service Medal; American Campaign Medal; Asiatic-Pacific Campaign Medal with five battle stars; World War II Victory Medal; 5 battle stars

USS S-32 (SS-137) was an S-class submarine of the United States Navy.

== Construction and commissioning ==
S-32 was laid down on 12 April 1918 by the Union Iron Works in San Francisco, California. She was launched on 11 January 1919, sponsored by Miss Margaret Tynan, and commissioned on 15 June 1922.

== Service history ==
=== 1922–1941 ===
Soon after commissioning, S-32, assigned to Submarine Division 17 and home-ported at San Pedro, California, was ordered to New London, Connecticut. She was decommissioned there on 25 September 1922 and, after engineering alterations by the prime contractor, the Electric Boat Company, and the engineering sub-contractor, the New London Ship and Engine Company, she was recommissioned on 21 February 1923. Temporary duty with Submarine Division 11 then took her south to the Caribbean Sea and the Panama Canal Zone for 1923 winter exercises with the Fleet, after which she rejoined the S-boats of her division, now designated Submarine Division 16, and returned to San Pedro.

During the summer of 1923, she participated in cold-weather exercises in the Aleutian Islands. In the fall of 1923, she resumed local operations off Southern California, and during the winter of 1923–1924 she returned to the Panama Canal Zone. In April 1924, she moved back to San Pedro, from which she operated until 1925. Early in 1925, her division was transferred to the United States Asiatic Fleet in the Philippines, and its submarines shifted to Mare Island, California, to prepare for the trans-Pacific crossing.

On 15 April 1925, S-32 departed San Francisco for the Philippines. She arrived at Cavite on Luzon in mid-summer 1925 and through the winter of 1926 conducted local exercises in the Luzon area. In the spring of 1926 she deployed to the coast of China, conducting exercises both en route to and from her summer base, the former Imperial German Navy base at Tsingtao. Overhaul followed her September 1926 return to the Philippines. She repeated this annual employment schedule for the next six years.

In 1932, Submarine Division 16 was transferred to Pearl Harbor, Hawaii. S-32 departed Manila Bay on 2 May 1932 and, at arrived at Pearl Harbor at the end of May 1932. Pearl Harbor was her home port for the next five years.

In June 1937, S032 departed Pearl Harbor for the United States East Coast. In August 1937, she reported for inactivation at Philadelphia, Pennsylvania, and on 7 December 1937 she was decommissioned and berthed at League Island in Philadelphia.

In the summer of 1940, S-32 began reactivation. Recommissioned on 18 September 1940 and assigned to Submarine Division 52, S-32 conducted trials from New London through November 1940 and, in December 1940, proceeded to the Panama Canal Zone, from which she operated until April 1941. She then returned to New London but, toward the end of April 1941, she moved to Bermuda. Through May 1941, she patrolled and conducted training exercises out of the base at St. George, Bermuda, that the United States had acquired from the United Kingdom in the Destroyers for Bases Agreement of 2 September 1940.

In late June 1941, S-32 returned to New London and resumed exercises. In September 1941, she moved to Philadelphia for an overhaul and, by December 1941, she was back at New London.

=== World War II ===
==== First, second, and third war patrols ====
The Japanese attack on Pearl Harbor brought the United States into World War II on 7 December 1941, and early in 1942 S-32 received orders to return to the Panama Canal Zone. She arrived at Coco Solo, Panama, in February 1942. During the spring of 1942, she conducted two defensive war patrols in the Pacific approaches to the Panama Canal.

On 3 June 1942, the Aleutian Islands campaign began with the Battle of Dutch Harbor, followed quickly by the Japanese occupation of Attu and Kiska. In June 1942, S-32 proceeded to San Diego, California, en route to the Aleutian Islands. In early July 1942, she arrived at Dutch Harbor on Amaknak Island off Unalaska in the Aleutians, and on 7 July 1942 she departed Dutch Harbor on her first offensive war patrol and third patrol overall. She patrolled the fog-covered waters of the Rat Islands and Amchitka into August 1942, then shifted to an area north of Attu. She returning to Dutch Harbor on 10 August 1942.

==== Fourth war patrol ====
On 22 August 1942, S-32 departed Dutch Harbor on her fourth war patrol. Moving westward, she hunted for Japanese ships in the sea lanes between Kiska and Attu during the first week of the patrol. On 28 August, leaks developed in her after trim tank, but her crew compensated for them by placing 9 short tons (8.0 long tons; 8.2 tonnes) of water in the forward trim tanks. Although this meant that space was left to accommodate water for only one torpedo reload, S-32′s crew regained depth control, and with fuel suction shifted forward, reload capability slowly improved.

On 29 August 1942, S-32 was off Amchitka to check for Japanese shipping in sheltered areas on Amchitka's north coast. On 31 August 1942, she headed east to cover the Allied occupation of Adak Island. On 14 September 1942, she returned to the junction of Rat Island and Amchitka, where she continued her patrol for another six days. On 20 September 1942, she headed for Dutch Harbor, which she reached on 23 September 1942.

==== Fifth war patrol ====
S-32 departed Dutch Harbor on 8 October 1942 to begin her fifth war patrol. During a trim dive, her crew discovered a fuel shortfall of about 9,000 US gallons (7,500 imperial gallons; 34,000 litres) caused by the presence of water in the line during fueling at Dutch Harbor. As a result, she ran out of reserve fuel in the number three main ballast tank on 12 October 1942, but she nonetheless continued west to a patrol area in the Kuril Islands.

On 17 October 1942, S-32 arrived off Paramushiro at the northern end of the Kurils, and that evening she took up station off the southeast coast of the island to patrol the entrances to Musashi Bay and Onekotan Strait. On the morning of 18 October 1942, she sighted two ships at anchor in Musashi Bay, and, after a periscope check disclosed no other ships in the area, she began working her way to an attack position west or southwest of the ships. Moving slowly through the calm and poorly charted bay with only short and infrequent periscope exposures, she went up for a final check at 10:23. While looking, she struck an uncharted sand bar. S-32, her torpedo tubes ready for firing, angled up 10 degrees. Her depth gauge showed 32 feet (9.8 m). During the next few seconds she slid over the bar, apparently showing her periscope shears, bow, and possibly her whole bridge structure above water; then, over the bar, she took a down angle at high speed. At 10:25, she fired two torpedoes set to run at a depth of 6 feet (1.8 m) at each of the ships. On firing the fourth and final torpedo, she changed course and maneuvered at high speed toward the open sea. Her crew heard two explosions as she cleared the immediate area.

At 10:45, S-32 came to periscope depth to observe the damage. One of the ships was afire amidships and had settled somewhat; she was anchored in shallow water and might have been resting on the bottom. The second ship was obscured by the first. S-32 went to 80 feet (24 m) and proceeded out of the bay. At 12:05, she resumed her patrol east of Onekotan Strait. That evening, she began her return voyage to the Aleutians, and on 27 October 1942 she arrived at Dutch Harbor.

==== November 1942–February 1943 ====
From Dutch Harbor, S-32 returned to San Diego, which she reached on 11 November 1942. An overhaul there followed, and from 21 to 25 December 1942 she tested newly installed equipment — a fathometer, radar, and keel-mounted sound gear. From 28 December 1942 to 26 January 1943, she provided services to the West Coast Sound School. On 6 February 1943, she headed north toward Dutch Harbor.

==== Sixth war patrol ====
S-32 departed Dutch Harbor on her sixth war patrol on 25 February 1943. En route to her assigned patrol area off Attu, she encountered very rough seas, strong winds, rain, mist, and fog. On 26 February 1943, she rolled as much as 65 degrees to starboard.

Progress west was slow, but, on 1 March 1943 she set a course toward Holtz Bay on the northeast coast of Attu to check for Japanese shipping there. On 2 March 1943, heavy mist and fog hindered her reconnaissance of Stellar Cove, but she turned to the shipping lanes along the coast of Attu to intercept Japanese ships between Cape Wrangell and Holtz Bay. The entrances to Holtz Bay, Chichagof Harbor, and Sarana Bay, were her primary hunting grounds. On the night of 9 March 1942, off Holtz Bay, she attacked and damaged an Imperial Japanese Navy destroyer, then underwent a brief depth charging. The depth charging caused leaks, but her crew minimized them, and S-32 continued her patrol.

Four nights later, on 13 March 1943, S-32 attacked Japanese submarine which was lying to on the surface with her engines smoking 17 nautical miles (31 km; 20 mi) north of Holtz Bay. At 20:59, S-32 launched two torpedoes at the Japanese submarine at ten-second intervals. At 21:00, she went deep, and as she passed 50 feet (15 m), one torpedo exploded. At 21:20, S-32 came to periscope depth, but fog had closed in and the Japanese submarine was no longer visible.

On the afternoon of 15 March 1943, S-32 sighted another Japanese submarine. For the first time during S-32′s patrol, according to her crew, the weather was "perfect for a periscope approach." At 17:27, S-32 fired a three-torpedo spread and an estimated range of 2,500 yards (2,300 m) with a track angle favorable. About two and a half minutes later, crewmen in S-32′s torpedo room heard a muffled explosion, but her fire control control party heard nothing. S-32 went to periscope depth and observed smoke was pouring skyward from the Japanese submarine's conning tower. Her crew took a periscope photograph of the scene as the damaged Japanese submarine headed for the nearest beach. At 17:36, however, the Japanese submarine disappeared from view. S-32′s sound operated reported that the Japanese submarine′s screws had stopped.

S-32 departed the Attu area early on the morning of 17 March 1943. On 20 March 1943, she moored at Dutch Harbor.

==== Seventh war patrol ====
On 29 March 1943, S-32 again departed Dutch Harbor and headed west for her seventh war patrol. En route to Attu, cold weather caused icing on her superstructure, but the seas remained fairly calm and the sun was occasionally visible. On 3 April 1943, however, as she approached Attu, more normal Aleutian weather closed in. From then to 16 April 1943, snow and rain storms were almost continuous, seas were rough, winds were strong, and periods of sunlight were limited.

At 01:57 on 10 April 1943, while patrolling on a north-south line off Holtz Bay, S-32 picked up a target on radar some 7,000 yards (6,400 m) away. At 02:07, S-32′s radar detected a second, smaller ship ahead of the first target. At 02:12, S-32 sighted the first ship at a range of about 2,000 yards (1,800 m). She launched four torpedoes. Her crew heard two very loud explosions followed by distant rumblings. At 02:19, at a range of just over 3,500 yards (3,200 m), all traces of the ships disappeared from S-32′s radar screen.

On 16 April 1943, S-32 set a course for Dutch Harbor. On 20 April 1943, she arrived and commenced refit.

==== Eighth war patrol ====
On 4 May 1943, S-32 again sailed west to commence her eighth and final war patrol. En route to the Kurils, she patrolled across possible Japanese reinforcement routes to Kiska and Attu, but almost zero visibility during the passage hindered hunting, an on 11 May 1943 her radar broke down. On 12 May 1943, she entered her assigned area off Paramushiro. On 13 May 1943, she obtained her first navigational fix, off Onekotan, and commenced patrolling across the approaches to Onekotan Strait and Musashi Bay. Visibility remained poor, and seas were rough. Her radar functioned improperly throughout her short time on station. On 15 May 1943, the port main motor armature developed a zero resistance to ground. Repeated repair attempts failed, and the motor was secured. S-32 turned back toward Dutch Harbor, where she moored on 23 May 1943.

==== May 1943–September 1945 ====
On 27 May, S-32 departed the Aleutians for the last time. On 6 June 1943 she arrived at San Diego, where she provided training services for the remainder of World War II. Hostilities ended in mid-August 1945, and shortly thereafter S-32 was designated for inactivation. She arrived at San Francisco on 13 September 1945.

== Decommissioning and disposal ==
S-32 was decommissioned at Mare Island on 19 October 1945. Her name was struck from the Naval Vessel Register on 1 November 1945, and her hulk was sold for scrapping in May 1946 to the Learner Company of Oakland, California.

== Awards and honors ==
- American Defense Service Medal
- American Campaign Medal
- Asiatic-Pacific Campaign Medal with five battle stars
- World War II Victory Medal

S-32's five battle stars for her service in World War II was the highest number of battle stars earned by an S-class submarine.
