= Saren =

Saren or SAREN may refer to:

== Given name ==
- Saren Arterius, fictional character in the Mass Effect video game franchise
- Saren Joseph Simitian (born 1953), American politician

== Surname ==
- Bhutnath Saren, Indian politician
- Ilkka Sarén (1940–2022), Finnish chess master
- Lakshman Chandra Saren, Indian writer
- Rajib Lochan Saren, Indian politician
- Uma Saren (born 1984), Indian politician, member of the Lok Sabha in 2014–2019

== Other ==
- Saren (sausage), a type of blood sausage from Java, Indonesia
- Servicio Autónomo de Registros y Notarías (SAREN), a register for official documents in Venezuela

== See also ==
- Sarens, a Belgian multinational company
- Saran (disambiguation)
- Sarin (disambiguation)
