= Sarana Pass =

Coordinates: 52°54′15″N 173°11′30″E

Sarana Pass is a pass in the mountains of northeastern Attu Island in the Aleutian Islands in Alaska.

Together with Sarana Valley, Sarana Pass leads from Sarana Bay on the east coast of the island northward to Chichagof Harbor on the island's northeast coast.
