= Saron =

Saron may refer to:

== Places ==
- Saron (Cantabria, Spain), a village of Santa Maria de Cayón Municipalitie
- Saron, Carmarthenshire, a small mining village in West Wales near Ammanford
- Saron, Denbighshire, a small village in Wales
- Saron, Gwynedd, a hamlet near Caernarfon in Wales (grid reference SH4659)
- Saron, Thiruvannamalai, a township in the Indian district of Thiruvannamalai
- Saron, Western Cape, a town in South Africa
- Pikin Saron, an indigenous village in Suriname

=== Chapels ===
- Saron Baptist Chapel, Saron, Carmarthenshire, Wales
- Saron Chapel, Aberaman (Independent), Rhondda Cynon Taf, Wales

== Other uses ==
- Saron (mythology), a king in Greek mythology
- A Biblical name also written as Sharon
- Saron Läänmäe (born 1996), Estonian footballer
- Saron (instrument), an instrument in the Indonesian gamelan ensemble
- Saron Gas, original name of hard rock band Seether
- SARON, Swiss Average Rate Overnight, an interest rate statistic
- Saron (crustacean), a genus of shrimp
- Saron (name), another form of Sharon

== See also ==
- Sarin, an organophosphorus compound with the formula [(CH3)2CHO]CH3P(O)F used as a chemical weapon
- Sauron, a character in The Lord of the Rings
- Sarong, a garment of Indonesian origin and widely worn throughout South and Southeast Asia
- Sharon
