= Paktika University =

University in Sharan, Afghanistan

Coordinates: 31.63815°N 65.69693°E

- پوهنتون پکتیکا / د پکتیکا پوهنتون
- Type: Public
- Established: 2012
- Affiliations: Shaikh Zayed University
- Chairman: Ali Jan Adil
- Faculty: 40
- Administrative staff: 15
- Students: c. 2,000
- Undergraduates: c. 2,000
- Location: Sharan, Paktika Province, Afghanistan
- Website: pktku.edu.af

Paktika University (Pashto: د پکتیکا پوهنتون; Dari: پوهنتون پکتیکا) is a public university in Sharan, which is the capital of Paktika Province in eastern Afghanistan. The university was established in 2012 and now has around 2,000 students. Its first chancellor was Mohammad Shifa Tassal. In April 2017 Daryar Khan Hasand was the chancellor.

Paktika University enrolls around 500 students each year through an entrance exam directly under the control of the Afghan Ministry of Higher Education.

== Overview ==
Paktika University was established in 2012 based on the national developing policy of the government in the education sector in the framework of the Ministry of Higher Education. At first it had only one faculty of Education. Later the faculty of Agriculture was established in 2013.

== ٍEducation Faculty ==
The Education faculty was the first in Paktika University. The Education faculty offers a four-year Education program. The Faculty has around 1,500 students and enrolls around 400 students each year.

The Faculty Has Seven Departments:

- Department of English language and literature
- Department of Chemistry
- Department of Mathematics
- Department of Physics
- Department of Biology
- Department of Pashto language and literature
- Department of Islamic Studies

== ٍAgriculture Faculty ==
The Agriculture faculty was the Second Faculty in Paktika University. The faculty offers a four-year Education program. The Faculty has around 500 students and enrolls around 200 students each year.

The Faculty Has Two Departments:

- Department of Horticulture
- Department of Animal science

== See also ==
- List of universities in Afghanistan
