= USS Whale (SS-239) =

Submarine of the United States

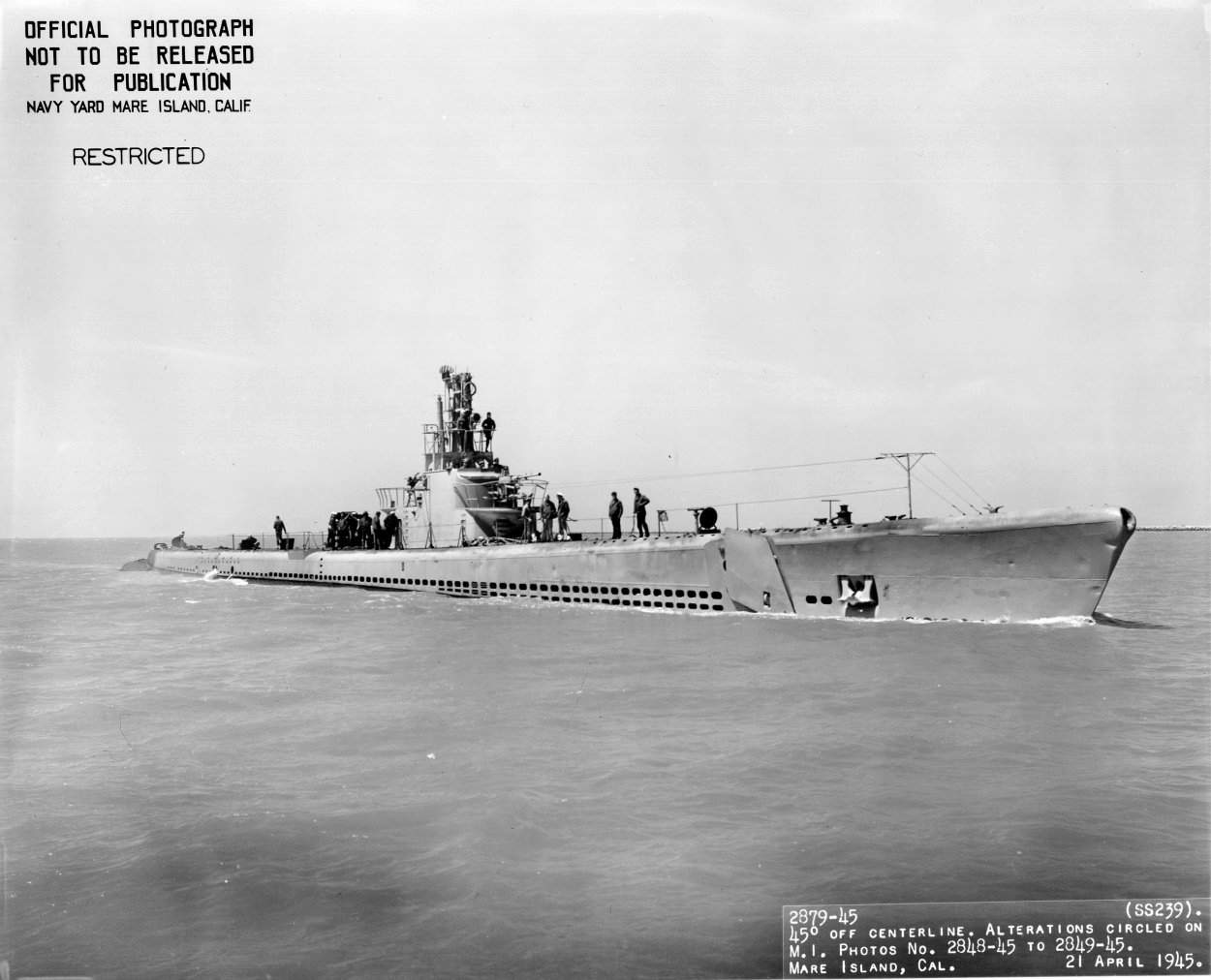
- USS Whale (SS-239), 21 April 1945.

History

United States
- Builder: Mare Island Naval Shipyard
- Laid down: 28 June 1941
- Launched: 14 March 1942
- Sponsored by: Mrs. A. D. Denny
- Commissioned: 1 June 1942
- Decommissioned: 1 June 1946
- Stricken: 1 March 1960
- Fate: Sold for scrap, 14 October 1960

General characteristics
- Class & type: Gato-class diesel-electric submarine
- Displacement: 1,525 long tons (1,549 t) surfaced; 2,424 long tons (2,463 t) submerged
- Length: 311 ft 9 in (95.02 m)
- Beam: 27 ft 3 in (8.31 m)
- Draft: 17 ft (5.2 m) maximum
- Propulsion: 4 × General Motors Model 16-248 V16 Diesel engines driving electric generators; 2 × 126-cell Sargo batteries; 4 × high-speed General Electric electric motors with reduction gears; two propellers; 5,400 shp (4.0 MW) surfaced; 2,740 shp (2.0 MW) submerged
- Speed: 21 kn (39 km/h) surfaced; 9 kn (17 km/h) submerged
- Range: 11,000 nmi (20,000 km) surfaced at 10 kn (19 km/h)
- Endurance: 48 hours at 2 kn (4 km/h) submerged; 75 days on patrol
- Test depth: 300 ft (90 m)
- Complement: 6 officers, 54 enlisted
- Armament: 10 × 21-inch (533 mm) torpedo tubes; 6 forward, 4 aft; 24 torpedoes; 1 × 3-inch (76 mm) / 50 caliber deck gun; Bofors 40 mm and Oerlikon 20 mm cannon

USS Whale (SS-239), a Gato-class submarine, was the second ship of the United States Navy to be named for a whale, an extremely large, aquatic mammal that is fishlike in form. The USS Cachalot (SS-170) (Cachalot, another name for a Sperm Whale) commissioned on 1 December 1933 preceded the Whale.

Her keel was laid down on 28 June 1941 by the Mare Island Naval Shipyard of Vallejo, California. She was launched on 14 March 1942 (sponsored by Mrs. A. D. Denny, wife of Captain A. D. Denny, the commanding officer of the shipyard), and commissioned on 1 June 1942, with Lieutenant Commander (Lt. Cmdr.) John B. Azer in command.

Dock trials and initial shakedown training commenced on 30 July. The submarine—escorted by destroyer Kilty (DD-137)—departed San Francisco, California, on 4 August and arrived at San Diego, California, two days later. Between 30 July and 9 September, she conducted type training in the San Diego and San Francisco areas.

== First war patrol, October – November 1942 ==
Whale got underway from San Francisco on 23 September and arrived at Pearl Harbor four days later. The submarine departed Hawaii on 9 October 1942, headed via Midway Island for "Imperial Waters" (the seas surrounding The Empire of Japan), and conducted training dives and battle surface drills en route. She arrived at her assigned patrol area off Kii Suido on 25 October and began to reconnoiter the vicinity which had been designated for a naval minefield. Her original plans had called for the submarine to lay mines 20 nautical miles (37 km) offshore. However, after sighting several outbound freighters about 1 nautical mile (1.9 km) from the coast, executive officer Frederick "Fritz" Harlfinger II (who later commanded Trigger) convinced Azer that the mines be planted as close in as possible. Hence Whale's first war patrol was conducted "within spitting distance" of the Japanese beach. Whale was the first American submarine to plant mines in Empire waters. During the war, no one on the American side knew how effective these mines proved to be, but a postwar analysis of Japanese shipping records credited Whale's minefield with sinking five enemy ships.

The following day, Whale arrived at Seto Saki hoping to intercept some inbound freighter traffic. By the light of a full moon, she sighted a large freighter directly ahead and fired a three-torpedo spread at the target. Two torpedoes hit the cargo ship, and she went down by the bow with her screws in the air. Whale sighted a second target astern of the freighter, launched three torpedoes, and observed that target listing slightly to port and heading for the beach. Whale fired a stern shot at a third freighter and heard a heavy torpedo explosion after 43 seconds.

From 27 to 29 October, Whale patrolled the entrance to Bungo Suido. On 30 October, while 10 nautical miles (19 km) off Ichie Saki, Whale spotted two freighters and a torpedo boat as escort; she launched two torpedoes at each of the ships, but scored only one hit. The torpedoes alerted the escort which bore down on the submarine and attacked her with depth charges. A 17-hour chase ensued in which Whale was badly damaged yet managed to shake the torpedo boat three times.

After an unsuccessful search for a disabled sampan, Whale made rendezvous with an escort and proceeded to Pearl Harbor where she underwent repairs from 10 November 1942 through 2 January 1943. The next day, Whale got underway from the Submarine Base, Pearl Harbor, bound for the Marshall Islands. After conducting training dives and drills en route, she arrived in the Wotje and Kwajalein area on 10 January for two days' patrol off those atolls.

== Second war patrol, January – February 1943 ==
On 13 January 1943, Whale began cruising the shipping lane from Kwajalein to Truk. She sighted a freighter and pursued her quarry for 117 nautical miles (217 km) before finally managing to work into position dead ahead of the target. She then launched four torpedoes. The first hit struck the freighter aft and broke off about 100 feet (30 m) of the stern; the second struck just forward of the bridge, and the fourth also exploded on target. Within six minutes, 3,559 ton Iwashiro Maru had sunk about 40 nautical miles north of Kwajalein, 09°54'N, 167°07'E., and Whale resumed her voyage toward Truk, running submerged.

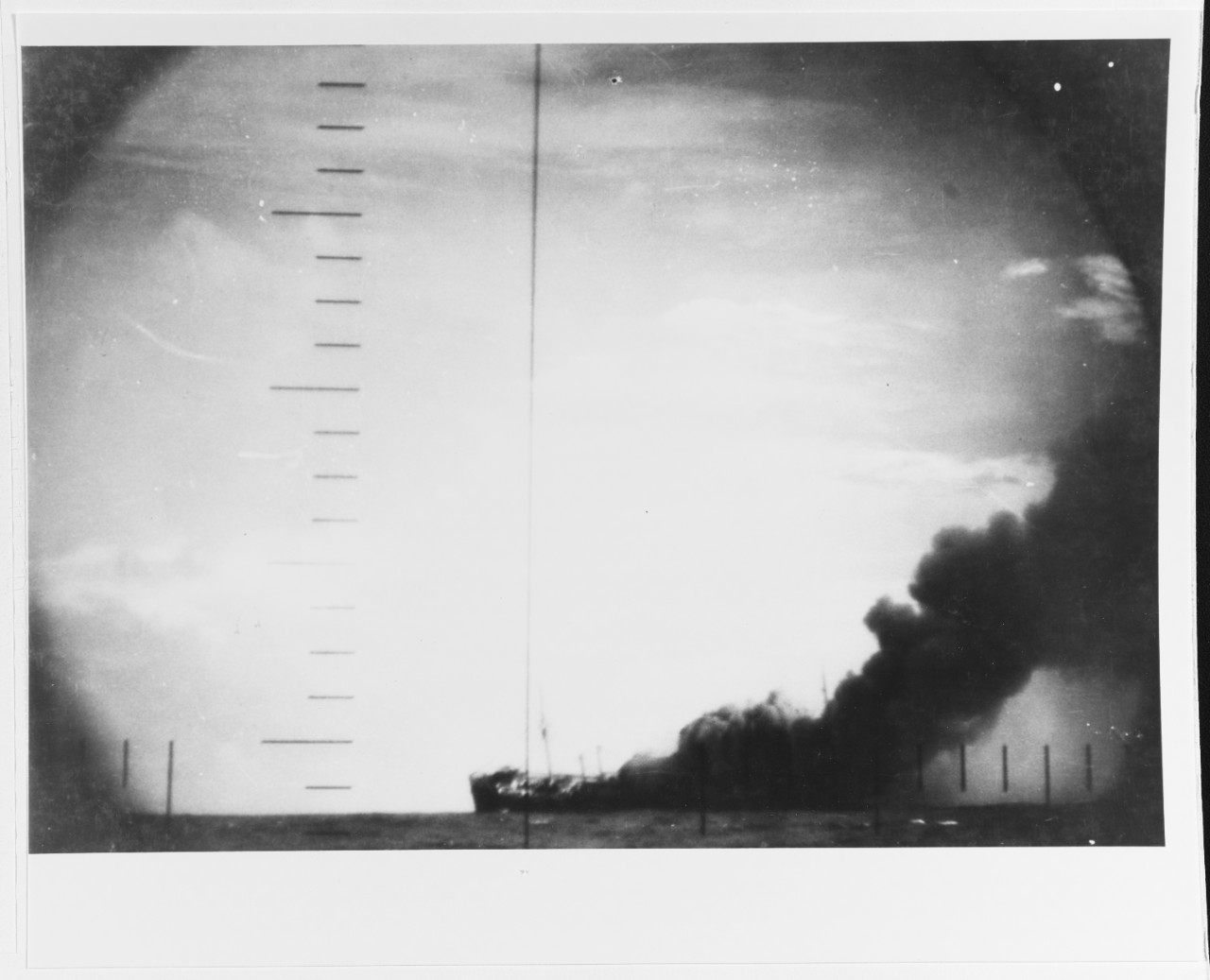
Heiyo Maru afire and sinking

Whale conducted surface patrols on the Truk-Empire shipping lanes until 17 January when she sighted a passenger/freighter bringing in troop reinforcements. Through the periscope, Whale observed hundreds of uniformed soldiers crowding the decks. She fired nine torpedoes and scored eight direct hits. All hits were necessary to sink the 9,816 ton Heiyo Maru north-east of Truk in position 10°13'N, 151°25'E.; the cargo must have been of such a nature as to prevent her from sinking more rapidly.

The next seven days were spent patrolling the Caroline Islands. On 25 January while on a surface patrol along the Truk–Empire line, Whale sighted smoke in the bright moonlight and fired a three-torpedo spread from the stern tubes at the target. Only one torpedo scored a hit. The damaged tanker, Syoyo Maru, sent up a flare which summoned an escort to her rescue. Whale went deep and sustained light damage from several depth charges.

The following evening, Whale sighted the smoke of a steamer about 16 nautical miles (30 km) on her starboard bow. She closed and launched one torpedo. A dull thud was heard throughout the boat, and no explosion occurred. The next morning (27 January), the submarine fired a three torpedo spread at the steamer but heard no explosions. A fourth torpedo also failed to explode, and the target, transport Shoan Maru (5624 GRT) attacked in the central Pacific in position 14°24'N, 153°30'E.turned away from the submarine, presenting only her stern to view. Whale fired a fifth and sixth torpedo; the latter passed directly below the target's stern and must have run under its full length without detonating. The Japanese ship then began dropping depth charges as she drew away. Whale fired her last remaining torpedo which hit the target just abaft her stack, causing her to lose power. Although Whale was credited with the kill, the Shoan Maru is towed to Saipan and grounded. After this action, Whale set her course for Midway, where she arrived 2 February 1943 and commenced preparations for her next patrol.

== Third war patrol, February – April 1943 ==
Refitting was completed on 16 February. Four days later, Lt. Cmdr. Azer was relieved of command by Lt. Cmdr. Albert C. Burrows. On the last day of the month, after various test dives and underway tests, Whale got underway for the Mariana Islands on her third war patrol. She arrived off Tanapag Harbor, Saipan, on 10 March and began patrolling the shipping lanes between the Mariana Islands and Japan.

On the evening of 19 March, Whale sighted two large freighters and one torpedo boat or destroyer as escort. Just after daylight the next morning, the submarine finally worked into a favorable attack position; she fired spreads of three torpedoes at each freighter, and hit both. The first target, tentatively identified as Mogamigawa Maru, sank rapidly by the stern. The second, a cargo ship resembling Arizona Maru, was plagued by several heavy internal explosions following a second torpedo hit. Whale, mistaking these secondary explosions for bombs, went deep. Upon discovering her mistake, she started to surface but was greeted by a barrage of depth charges from the escort. Whale dove again but again came under attack – this time from the air – when she attempted to return to examine the wreckage. The submarine suffered extensive damage during this attack, which prevented her learning the fate of her targets. This was by far Whale's closest escape.

Whale continued to patrol shipping lanes to Kobe and Tokyo and, while off Tanapag Harbor on the evening of 22 March, she sighted the masts of two ships and the smoke of a third, all leaving the harbor. Whale tried to close but lost contact. The next morning, the submarine gained a position ahead of two freighters and fired two spreads of three torpedoes each. Two hits were observed on each target, one under each stack and a second under each stern. The closer freighter, Kenyo Maru, blew up with a tremendous explosion and sank in four minutes leaving no survivors. Part of the stern of the farther ship blew 60 feet (18 m) into the air, and she appeared to be sinking slowly by the stern as she signaled rapidly with a blinker light.

Fearing the approach of an escort, Whale fired a fourth torpedo which ran "hot, straight and normal" for one minute, then circled, heading back in the direction of Whale. "We went to 120 feet (37 m) and prayed", the commanding officer later reported. The erratic torpedo changed its mind after reaching Whale's beam and headed back for the freighter, finally exploding. The target was awash from stern to stack and on fire forward. At morning twilight, the ship was still burning with her bow up and her stern under.

The submarine spent the next two days patrolling the Kobe-Saipan, Empire-Truk shipping routes. On the morning of 25 March, she sighted the smoke of a small freighter and pursued it throughout the remainder of that day and the next, firing seven torpedoes at the target, all misses. Either the target's draft had been overestimated or the torpedoes ran too deep, or both. This poor torpedo performance was bitterly disappointing to the submarine's crew. "The thought of the fuel expended," her commanding officer lamented, "on the long, endaround runs, coupled with the loss of the torpedoes themselves, made 'heartbreaking' but an inadequate euphemism."

On 28 March, Whale was on the surface, intending to cross the Saipan-Truk route, when she spotted the smoke of a small freighter headed for Truk. She fired a three torpedo spread; the target made an unanticipated zig, and all three torpedoes missed. A lack of fuel forced Whale to abandon her quarry, and she headed north along the Empire–Truk route.

Whale headed homeward on 31 March, and she arrived at Midway on 6 April. She refueled there, had her last torpedo removed, and sailed for Hawaii the following day, conducting daily training of gun crews and test dives for radio reception en route. She arrived at Pearl Harbor on 11 April and underwent refitting, subsequent tests, and then training. Whale got underway westward again on 5 May and arrived at Midway four days later to undergo repairs to her hydraulic system and her air search radar. Whale departed Midway to begin her fourth war patrol on 10 May.

== Fourth war patrol, May – June 1943 ==
Whale was ordered to take station 30 nautical miles (56 km) east of Wake Island at 05:00 on 16 May, to assist in guiding in the Army Air Corps B-24 Liberator bombers to that island for a bombing attack and to pick up the crews from any plane that was shot down or ditched. She arrived on 15 May and was ordered to remain on the surface until released by the Bombardment Group Commander or attacked by the enemy. Whale sat surfaced in broad daylight until 09:45 waiting for the bombing to commence. At that time, observers on the submarine saw a flight of seven Liberators heading for Wake, and the attack began. Radar picked up a contact at 11 nautical miles (20 km) and coming in fast. As Whale submerged, a bomb exploded 500 yards (460 m) astern of the submarine, causing no damage. At 19:22, Whale received a message releasing her from duty, and she proceeded to the Saipan area.

From 20 – 24 May, Whale patrolled the shipping lanes between Japan, Truk, and Saipan. On the latter day, she conducted a search for a submarine base reportedly on Rota; finding nothing, she surfaced and headed for Guam.

The following day, Whale sighted the masts of three ships in the harbor at Apra, Guam, anchored in such a way as to be protected by reef islands. A retriever type sampan appeared to be the only antisubmarine measure. Waiting outside the harbor, Whale sighted and then tracked the 3,580 ton auxiliary gunboat Shoei Maru. At 00:14 on 26 May, Whale fired her first torpedo which hit with a blinding, orange flash midway between the stack and bow of the freighter. The explosion blew away the ship's entire bow, and she sank in four minutes with no survivors. The vessel sank about 17 nautical miles north-northwest of Rota Island, Mariana Islands in position 14°17'N, 144°54'E.

On 5 June, Whale sighted the masts of a seaplane tender, and tracked and closed the target. The submarine launched four torpedoes, scoring three hits. The target's screws stopped instantly, and powerful, rumbling explosions came from the target. However, the tender must have managed to limp to port since postwar study of Japanese records did not confirm a kill. An escort was "running wild" toward Whale, so she went deep and eluded her pursuer.

The submarine spent the next three days patrolling the Saipan area and, on 8 June, set a course for the Empire–Truk route through the Mariana Islands. The next day, she sighted the masts and kingposts of two large freighters about 800–1,000 yards (730–910 m) abeam of each other with an escort ahead of and between them. Whale launched three torpedoes at the first freighter, scoring two hits. She then shifted to the second freighter and fired the fourth, fifth, and sixth torpedoes. Tremendous explosions from the first ship were followed by two more explosions. The submarine commander concluded that one or more of the latter spread of torpedoes—aimed at the second freighter—hit the first, already damaged target. Whale fired another three-torpedo spread at the second freighter and soon heard two heavy explosions followed by a deep, rumbling detonation with the accompanying water noises which suggested that a ship was breaking up. Whale then headed eastward and touched at Midway on 17 June, before continuing on toward Hawaii. She arrived at Pearl Harbor on 21 June and commenced refitting.

== Fifth war patrol, July – September 1943 ==
After almost a month there, Whale returned to Midway, completed her refitting, and sailed for the Tokyo–Truk shipping lanes to begin her fifth war patrol. Stormy weather, heavy seas, and poor visibility persisted from 4–6 August. A wave washed over and covered the entire bridge structure, and large amounts of water flooded into the conning tower and down to the control room and the pump room. Whale headed southwest, to the east of the Bonin Islands. The continual pounding in heavy seas had cracked a number of battery jars, bringing the total of disabled cells to 10 forward and 13 aft.

On 7 August 1943, Whale covered the Tokyo-Truk lane east of the Bonins. The following day, Whale's periscope watch sighted a large aircraft ferry and her escort. When everything was ready to fire a spread of bow shots, the forward gyro regulator failed, and it was necessary to shift to manual operation. After one torpedo hit, 7,148 ton Naruto Maru stopped dead in her tracks, listed to starboard and started going down slowly by the stern. Whale fired another torpedo which hit amidships and prodded the ship into sinking faster; the vessel sank northwest of the Mariana Islands in position 24°12'N, 142°52'E. Whale survived a counter-attack by the escorting Japanese destroyer Asanagi. The submarine escaped aircraft bombs and set course for the Tokyo-Truk route.

From 9–19 August, she patrolled the Tokyo-Truk route, the Bonin area, and the East China Sea where, on 20 August, she was caught in a typhoon. She weathered the three-day storm with her only severe problem being a low main storage battery. On 24 August, Whale positioned herself 20 nautical miles (37 km) west of Kusakaki Shima and intercepted an enemy convoy headed for Nagasaki. Whale fired a salvo of four torpedoes and, other than hearing four explosions, did not manage to ascertain their effect. The ships were last seen going over the horizon, and pursuit was impractical due to the submarine's proximity to Nagasaki and the condition of her battery.

Whale was en route to Midway when she sighted two large cargo ships and a destroyer escort. She fired a salvo of three torpedoes, followed by a fourth stern shot. All four shots missed, and Whale continued toward home, touching at Midway on 2 September and pushing on toward Hawaii the following day. Whale arrived at Pearl Harbor on 7 September and commenced a major overhaul which lasted until 7 December.

== Sixth war patrol, December 1943 – February 1944 ==
Whale arrived at Midway on 25 December 1943 and departed for her sixth war patrol. For two weeks, Whale patrolled the Tokyo–Truk shipping lanes, Minami Shima, and the Mariana, Ryukyu, and Bonin Island areas. On 14 January 1944, she received a dispatch from submarine Seawolf (SS-197) stating that a convoy was headed in Whale's direction. Seawolf attacked the convoy the next day and sank a tanker, expending all of her torpedoes. Seawolf continued to trail the convoy, and Whale made radar contact on 16 January. Whale launched three torpedoes and sank the larger of the freighters, transport ship Denmark Maru (5869 GRT) about 400 nautical miles southeast of Okinawa in position 23°09'N, 135°14'E. However, she suffered minor damage from an ensuing barrage of depth charges. Seawolf verified the sinking and reported that the last freighter headed south alone. Since she lacked torpedoes, Seawolf unsuccessfully tried to engage the freighter with gunfire. But she assisted by driving the freighter in Whale's direction and by passing along the target's zig zag plan and speed. Whale fired four straight bow shots with one hit observed between the bow and stack. Four other explosions were heard and assumed to be either internal explosions or the torpedoes. The target seemed undamaged except for a slight trim down by the bow, and it was imperative that the ship be sunk expeditiously in order to avoid further depth charges by the escorts. Whale fired another stern shot which hit squarely under the stack, and the target, Tarushima Maru,(4865 GRT, torpedoed earlier that day by USS Seawolf) in position 22°50'N, 135°40'E. started down by the bow while Whale filmed her sinking. However, a postwar analysis of Japanese losses does not credit Whale with this kill.

Whale patrolled the Marianas and the Bonins from 18 to 23 January. On 24 January, she made contact with an enemy submarine and attempted an end-around, but her maneuver was thwarted by a fire in the trim pump which filled the control room with smoke, forcing Whale to surface. Two days later Whale—low on fuel—headed for Midway, arriving on 3 February for refitting. Lt. Cmdr. James B. Grady relieved Burrows as commanding officer on 9 February. A casualty to the starboard propeller necessitated a trip to Pearl Harbor, and it was not until 13 March that Whale returned to Midway, the staging port for her seventh patrol.

== Seventh war patrol, March – May 1944 ==
The next day, Whale got underway for a rendezvous point where she joined submarine Pollack (SS-180) on 23 March and patrolled along a likely shipping route east of Tori Shima and the Bonins. On 25 March, Whale changed course, passed between Tokara Shima, entered the East China Sea on 29 March, and conducted patrols off the western coast of Kyūshū, including Quelpart Island and Iki Shima. On 8 April, she torpedoed an unescorted freighter, Honan Maru(5401 GRT) off the north-western coast of Kyushu in position 33°45'N, 128°42'E which exploded and sank within 15 seconds. Nine days later, Whale made contact with two small destroyers or torpedo boats but was unable to close. She headed toward Nagasaki and patrolled uneventfully until 23 April when she was detected by a patrol boat 12 nautical miles (22 km) east of Asuseki Shima. Whale "turned tail at high speed and soon lost contact." She proceeded toward the Bonin Islands and made rendezvous with destroyer escort Fair (DE-35) on 2 May. The following day, she entered Majuro for refitting and a three-day training period.

== Eighth war patrol, May – July 1944 ==
Again ready for sea, Whale (with destroyer Cassin (DD-372) as escort) departed Majuro on 28 May for her eighth war patrol. She released the destroyer the following day and proceeded to the Japanese home islands. On 7 June, she made contact with a convoy traveling in two parallel columns: four freighters in the starboard column and two in the port. They were screened by three escorts. Whale chose the largest ship, a transport of about 10,000 tons, as her first target. She fired a three-torpedo spread, then shifted to a second freighter and fired another three-torpedo spread. A hit under the stack of the first target was followed by two timed hits on the second target. The two vessels sank were the Japanese transport Shinroku Maru (2857 GRT) and damaged the Japanese transport Sugiyama Maru (4379 GRT) north-northeast of the Bonin Islands in position 31°06'N, 142°34'E. Immediately, depth charges began to drop, Whale cleared the area to the southeast and later received a report of a crippled freighter in tow 120 nautical miles (220 km) north of her.

From 12 June to 4 July 1944, Whale patrolled off the southern coasts of Japan. She sighted several Japanese aircraft and a properly lighted hospital ship. On 5 July, Whale surfaced and set course for Midway where she arrived on 11 July. She pushed on toward Hawaii the following day and arrived at Pearl Harbor after a four-day passage. An extensive refitting lasted until 12 August and was followed by training exercises.

== Ninth war patrol, August – October 1944 ==
Whale got underway on 24 August for her ninth patrol. Shortly before, Admiral William "Bull" Halsey had requested a sizable force of submarines to form a reconnaissance line between the western Caroline Islands and the Philippine Islands to act as offensive scouts during Operation "Stalemate", the invasion of the Palau Islands. This flotilla, nicknamed the "Zoo", consisted of nine submarines organized into three "wolfpacks" under the overall command of Captain Charles W. ("Weary") Wilkins in submarine Seahorse (SS-304). Whale and Segundo (SS-398) joined Wilkins' own pack, which was known as the "Bears."

Whale arrived at Tanapag Harbor, Saipan, on 3 September and the next day got underway in company with the other "Bears" and coastal minesweeper Heed (AMC-100) which acted as their escort. She proceeded to a rendezvous with Barbero (SS-317) on 8 September about 45 nautical miles (83 km) from Samar Island, Philippines. She spent the next eight days making emergency repairs and conducting training dives, patrolling on station, and submerging to avoid detection by unidentified aircraft.

On 17 September, the position of the "Bear Pit" was changed to the southeast of Formosa, and Whale arrived on station on 20 September. Four days later, she received orders to disband and proceed as a coordinated attack group of four submarines called the "Bears" to "Convoy College", the north end of the South China Sea, between Luzon, Formosa, and China. She entered those strategic waters on 25 September and, the following day, she surfaced in Bashi Channel, 41 nautical miles (76 km) from Y'Ami Island of the Batan Islands, and proceeded to her patrol station south of Garan Bi, Formosa. On 27 September, Whale evaded a small patrol craft and the next day submerged for a periscope patrol 60 nautical miles (110 km) south of Formosa. On 29 September, she made rendezvous with Seahorse, received written instructions for conducting the remainder of the patrol; and set her course for a new station southwest of Formosa. The submarine arrived on station on 3 October and submerged some 60 miles (97 km) north of Cape Borjeador, Luzon, and patrolled around Calayan and Dalupiri islands in the Babuyan group.

"Wilkins' Bears" searched the Luzon Strait on 6 October and found a convoy of at least nine ships. Using a high periscope, Whale could see two large tankers, a large tender, and two Hibiki-class destroyers patrolling ahead of the tanker. Whale fired six bow tube shots at the tanker, then submerged quickly to avoid detection. The escorts dropped 34 depth charges, none of which was uncomfortably close. The sinking vessel was the Japanese tanker Akane Maru (10241 GRT) west of the Balintang Channel, North-North-West of Luzon in position 19°40'N, 118°05'E.Meanwhile, Seahorse verified the sinking of Whale's target, Akane Maru, and herself sank a destroyer that was picking up survivors from the tanker.

The next day, Whale received a message extending her patrol for seven days and ordering her to rendezvous with submarines Aspro (SS-309) and Cabrilla (SS-288) in the area northwest of Luzon on 9 and 10 October, respectively. Whale was harassed by plane contacts throughout the daylight hours of 16 October and she ordered to take a new station at the southwest end of Ryukyu Shoto in anticipation of a Japanese fleet sortie which never occurred. Three days later, Whale was ordered to head for Midway for refitting; she arrived there on 29 October.

== Tenth war patrol, November 1944 – January 1945 ==
Whale got underway on 21 November for her tenth war patrol. She reached the Ryukyus on 4 December and operated off those islands through the end of the year. On 22 December, she sighted eight twin engine planes and three trawlers. She launched four torpedoes at the trawlers without scoring a hit and then cleared the area. The following day, while submerged 12 nautical miles (22 km) southeast of Nakano Jima, Whale sighted four trawlers. She went to gun-action stations and fired at the ships using four-inch (102 mm) and .50-caliber guns. None of the fishing vessels fought back, and all were sunk within 80 minutes.

On 4 and 5 January 1945, Whale and sister ship Kingfish (SS-234) searched unsuccessfully in the waters near Sufu Gan for a life raft containing 11 survivors of a downed B-29 Superfortress. There were heavy seas and visibility was only 500 yards (460 m), and the B-29 did not answer calls on the lifeguard frequency. That lack of communication greatly hampered the rescue operation. On 6 January, Whale received orders to proceed via Midway to Hawaii, arriving at Pearl Harbor on 15 January. She soon pushed on to the west coast and entered the Mare Island Navy Yard on 26 January 1945 for an overhaul.

== Eleventh war patrol, June – August 1945 ==
After she returned to Pearl Harbor via San Francisco, California, it was discovered that the submarine's hydraulic plant required an overhaul. This delayed departure on patrol for one month. Meanwhile, Lt. Cmdr. Freeland H. Carde, Jr., relieved Commander (Cmdr.) James B. Grady. On 15 June, fully loaded with provisions and torpedoes, Whale commenced her 11th war patrol. En route to the Marianas, Whale conducted training drills – emphasizing evasive dives from aircraft – and battle surface drills. She arrived at Saipan on 21 June and, the next day, commenced patrolling across the Japan–Wake Island supply lines until 30 June when she headed for Guam. She arrived there on 6 July and got underway the following day for lifeguard duty. From 8–23 July, Whale conducted lifeguard patrols in the areas of Nanpō Islands, Marianas, and Bungo Suido. Whale sighted several American B-29 Superfortress and B-24 Liberator bombers overhead. She also encountered a few freighters afloat but could not get in position to attack. On occasion at night, she spotted Japanese planes that were searching the water for lights. During this period, Whale rescued 15 downed aviators, saving several under adverse conditions. For example, on 26 July, while going in close for a rescue, Whale sighted 43 floating naval mines in 20 minutes, many close aboard. As a result of this lifeguard duty, Whale discovered many flaws in the air-sea rescue doctrine and made several noteworthy recommendations to improve future operations.

Whale commenced patrol east of Okino Shima on 30 July and ran into heavy seas: "Couldn't hold our own with this current, so took soundings each half hour." On 4 August, she submerged for patrol off Bungo Suido and, four days later, made rendezvous with submarine Dragonet (SS-293) to take on board a rescued pilot. On 9 August, Whale received 16 aviators and one patient who were transferred from submarine Blackfish (SS-221), using a rubber boat with lines on bow and stern for propulsion. On 11 August, Whale received orders to proceed to Saipan for fuel and to Midway for refitting. She arrived at Saipan on 14 August. The next day, President of the United States Harry S. Truman announced the final Japanese capitulation. Whale sailed in company with submarine Scabbardfish (SS-397) for Hawaii and arrived at Pearl Harbor on 25 August 1945.

== Post-war operations, August 1945–1960 ==
Whale departed Pearl Harbor on 30 August, bound for the Panama Canal, and arrived there on 14 September. After a three-day stay, Whale sailed for New York City and arrived at Tompkinsville, Staten Island, on 23 September. In October, she moved north via Newport, Rhode Island, and entered Boston, Massachusetts, harbor on 23 September for the Navy Day celebration. She arrived at New London, Conn., on 30 October 1945 to prepare for inactivation.

Whale was decommissioned in January 1947, berthed in New London, Connecticut, and placed in the Atlantic Reserve Fleet. She was towed to Portsmouth, New Hampshire, where she arrived on 8 April 1948. Whale made several visits to Portsmouth and New London during the summer, and she finally came to rest at New London on 11 September 1948. The submarine was partially activated from 14 November to 14 December 1956 in order to replace submarine Tarpon (SS-175). Whale departed New London on 12 January 1957 and, on 22 January, arrived at New Orleans, Louisiana, where she was recommissioned upon arrival.

Whale was decommissioned for the last time in September 1957 and was struck from the Naval Vessel Register on 1 March 1960. While at New Orleans, she was sold for scrap on 29 September 1960.

Whale earned 11 battle stars during World War II, sinking 57,716 tons of Japanese shipping.
