= Sarana Valley =

Coordinates: 52.888°N 173.205°E

Sarana Valley is a valley in the mountains of northeastern Attu Island in the Aleutian Islands in Alaska.

The v-shaped valley extends northwest from Sarana Bay on Attu's east coast before angling northeast to Chichagof Harbor. Sarana Pass connects the valley to Holz Bay. Attu Island was attacked and taken by Japanese forces six months after the attack on Pearl Harbor. In the course of retaking the Island, U.S. forces were surprised in the Sarana Valley by 800 Japanese soldiers in an unsuccessful offensive attempt. Retaking the island cost 1500 American lives and 4350 Japanese lives.
