= Saran (name) =

Saran may refer to the following people

Given name

- Saran (director) (born 1975), Indian film director
- Saran Sérémé (born 1968), Burkinabé politician
- Saran Maneechot (born 2005), Thai rapper

Surname

- Daulat Ram Saran (1924–2011), Indian statesman
- Mohinder Saran, Canadian politician
- Murat Šaran (1949–2021), Bosnian football player
- Ram Saran (born 1963), Indian politician
- Richard Saran (1852–1925), German architect
- Shriya Saran Bhatnagar (born 1982), Indian film actress and model
- Shyam Saran (born 1946), Indian politician
- Suvir Saran (born 1972), Indian chef, cookbook author and educator
- Tribhuvaneshwar Saran Singh Deo (born 1952), Health minister of Chattishgarh and Head of the royal family of Surguja.
- Brij Bhushan Sharan Singh, Indian politician and Member of Parliament.
