= Sareen =

Sareen, also spelt Sarin, is a surname used by Hindu and Sikh Punjabi Khatris. Notable people with the surname include:

- Aditya Sareen (born 2008), Australian table tennis player
- Akansha Sareen (born 1992), Indian model and actress
- Amit Sarin, Indian television actor
- Apurva Sarin (born 1962), Indian cell biologist
- Arti Sarin, Indian admiral
- Arun Sarin (born 1954), Indian-American businessman
- Avinash Kaur Sarin (born 1965), Indian journalist and voice artist
- Deepak Sareen, Indian director
- G. S. Sareen (born 1966), Singaporean businessman
- Harish Chandra Sarin (1914–1997), Indian civil servant
- Manu Sareen (born 1967), Danish politician
- Michael Sarin (born 1965), American jazz drummer
- Nihal Sarin (born 2004), Indian chess grandmaster
- Rakesh Sarin, Indian-American academic
- Ritu Sarin, Indian film director, producer and artist
- Sam Sarin (1936–2020), Croatian fisherman and bluefin tuna entrepreneur
- Satish Sareen (born 1939), Indian air marshal and author
- Shiv Kumar Sarin (born 1952), Indian gastroenterologist and hepatologist
- Vic Sarin (born 1941), Canadian filmmaker
- Vishal Sareen (born 1973), Indian chess player
