= Sharana District =

Sharana ښرنه
- District
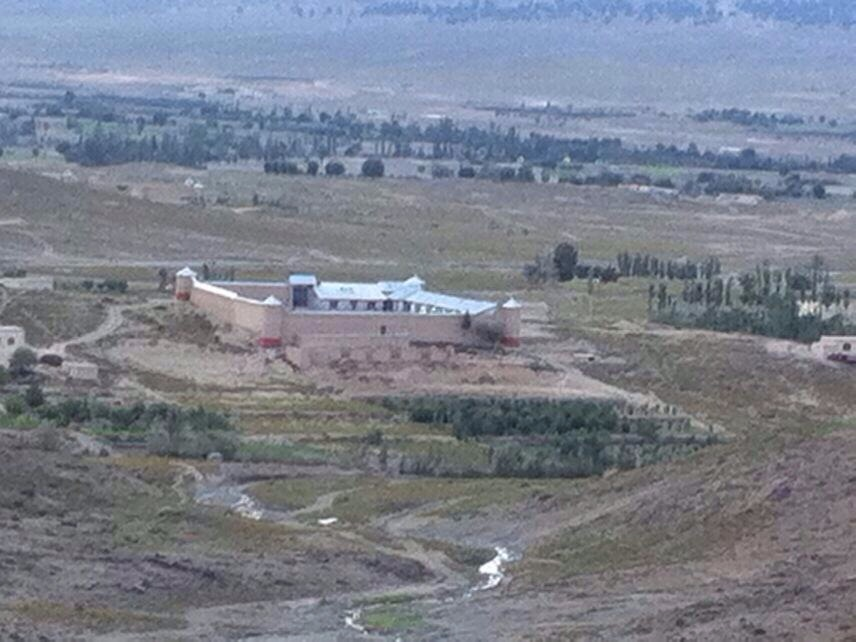
- Haji mohammad gul kala near orgun district

- Location in Afghanistan
- Coordinates: 33°7′48″N 68°46′48″E
- Country: Afghanistan
- Province: Paktika
- Capital: Sharana

Population (2019)
  - Total: 63,626
- Time zone: UTC+4:30

Sharana District (Pashto: ښرنه ولسوالۍ) or Sharan District is home to the city of Sharana, which is the capital of Paktika Province, Afghanistan. The Paktika Governor's compound is in Sharana, attached to the police headquarters for the province. The district is within the heartland of the Sulaimankhel tribe of Ghilji Pashtuns. The estimated population in 2019 was 63,626.

== City of Sharana ==
The small city of Sharana is located a mere five minutes walk from the Governor's compound. There was no single concrete government department or an office as well as no concrete markets till the end of 2006. By the end of the 2007 few government departments were built and by the end of 2008 some new concrete markets in Sharana bazaar were also built which changed the shape of Sharana bazaar. Some roads to the bordering districts have been also paved and are still going to be paved. Sharana is almost 50 – 60 km away from Ghazni provincial centre which takes normally one hour due to damage of some bridges and culverts by the Taliban and Haqqani Network. The population of Sharana is mostly composed of Pashtun, followed by minorities Hazara and Tajiks.

== PRT base ==
The Provincial Reconstruction Team base named Camp Kearney is located a five-minute drive east of the Governor's compound on the way to Urgun district which is another major city of Paktika province.

== Army base ==
There is also an Afghan National Army base, called FOB Rushmore, located just outside the Governor's compound in Sharana.
