= Ram Saran =

Members of the Uttar Pradesh Legislative Assembly
- Incumbent
- Assumed office 15 March 2012
- Constituency: SrinagarLakhimpur

Personal details
- Born: 2 April 1963 (age 63) Lakhimpur, Uttar Pradesh
- Party: Samajwadi Party
- Spouse: Shyama Devi
- Profession: Politician

Ram Saran represents Sninagar vidhansabha of Lakhimpur as member of the legislative assembly. He is an Indian politician and Member of the Samajwadi Party.

== Early life and education ==
Saran was born on 2 April 1963 in a middle-class family at Lakhimpur, Uttar Pradesh. His father Nangaram was a onetime Member of Legislative Uttar Pradesh. Saran did his basic education from government primary schools and graduated from KKC KKC, Lucknow.
