= Shahran, Iran =

Shahran (Persian: شهران or شاهران or شهرن) in Iran may refer to:

- Shahran, Gilan (شهران - Shahrān)
- Shahran, Ilam (شاهران - Shāhrān)
- Shahran, Razavi Khorasan (شهرن - Shahran)
