= Saron, Thiruvannamalai =

Saron
- Panchayat town
- Location in Tamil Nadu, India
- Coordinates: 12.20°N 79.11°E
- Country: India
- State: Tamil Nadu
- District: Tiruvannamalai

Government
  - Chairman: Shobiya Joseph (DMK)

Area
  - Total: 16.3 km^{2} (6.3 sq mi)
- Elevation: 171 m (561 ft)

Population (2012)
  - Total: 7,210
  - Density: 442/km^{2} (1,150/sq mi)

Languages
  - Official: Tamil
- Time zone: UTC+5:30 (IST)
- PIN: 606 608
- Telephone code: 91-4175
- Vehicle registration: TN 25
- Lok Sabha constituency: Thiruvannamlai
- Vidhan Sabha constituency: Thiruvannamalai City
- Climate: Moderate (Köppen)
- Avg. summer temperature: 41 °C (106 °F)
- Avg. winter temperature: 18 °C (64 °F)

Saron is a township in Tiruvannamalai Taluk in Tiruvannamalai District in Tamil Nadu State. Saron is 2.6 km far from its Taluk Main Town Tiruvannamalai. It is located 158 km distance from its State capital Chennai.

== Demographics ==
Saron having population of over 7000 providing sub urban to Tiruvannamalai urbanity. it comes under Tiruvannamalai urban agglomerations on tirukovilur road (chitoor- Cudllore road) NH 234A. there is two railway station for saron, one is "saron-church" and another one is "MELATHIKKAN - SARON" at tirukovilur railway route.

== Adjacent communities ==
Near By towns & panchayats with distance are Tiruvannamalai (2.9 km), Thenmathur (3.3 km), So. Kilnachipattu (3.4 km), Chinnakangiyanur (3.8 km), Nallavanpalayam (4.3 km). Towns nearby Tiruvannamalai (2.6 km), Thandrampet (15.3 km), Thurinjapuram (19.9 km), Keelpennathur (21.8 km).
