= Avinash Kaur Sarin =

Indian journalist and voice artist (born 1965)

- Born: Avinash Kaur; 21 July 1965 (age 60); New Delhi
- Education: Miranda House, University of Delhi
- Alma mater: University of Delhi
- Occupations: Broadcast journalist; News-anchor; Documentary director, Voice artist; Commentator
- Years active: 1978- Present
- Era: 1980's, 1990's, 2000's
- Organization: Doordarshan
- Known for: Introducing an easy charm and disposition while presenting news; a first for those times; Her big Bindi
- Notable work: Much acclaimed primetime documentary "Hiroshima-Nagasaki: The Journey"
- Spouse: Manjit Singh Sarin
- Children: Ruben Sarin; Avijit Sarin
- Parents: Prof. Rattan Singh (father); Darshan Kaur (mother)
- Awards: "Best News Anchor" as per Indian National Survey; TV and Video World Magazine; 1986, Adharshila Award "Best News Anchor" Bhumika Award "Best Hindi News Anchor"

Avinash Kaur Sarin is an Indian News Anchor, former Broadcast journalist, documentary director and television personality. She presented news as one of the primary news anchors of "Doordarshan", the National News Network of India; the sole news channel in India during the 1970s, 1980s, and 1990s. She later went on to direct several documentaries for the network on Asian culture. She is a member of the official panel of directors and producers at Doordarshan.

== Early life and career ==
Sarin was born into a Sikh family to a father who was a professor in music. She received double bachelor's degrees in Physics and Education from the University of Delhi. Sarin started as an anchor of a science show, Vigyan Patrika, on Doordarshan in 1979. She went on to become one of India's most popular news anchors of the 1980s and 1990s.

During the 1984 riots in Delhi, Sarin was out of sight for a month for health reasons. Millions of letters, including one from the President's House, were sent to the Doordarshan head office in Delhi enquiring about her well-being. This was a precedent of sorts in the history of television at the time.

== Personal life ==
Avinash Kaur married businessman Manjit Singh Sarin in New Delhi, India. They went on to have two children, a daughter, performing artist and actor Ruben, and a son, Avijit . a working professional

== Distinguishing Features ==
Sarin was known for her characteristic large Bindi which went on to become a rage with 1980s women all over India, as did her hand woven and crafted Indian saris.
