= Sarana (surname) =

Sarana (Cyrillic: Сарана) is a gender-neutral Slavic surname. Notable people with the surname include:

- Alexey Sarana (born 2000), Russian chess grandmaster
- Serhiy Sarana (born 1978), Ukrainian-Kazakhstani football player
- William Aditya Sarana (born 1996), Indonesian politician
