= Sarana (given name) =

Sarana is the given name of the following notable people:

- Sarana Gunawardena (born 1964), Sri Lankan politician
- Sarana VerLin (born 1953), American violinist, singer-songwriter and multi-instrumentalist
- Weliwita Sri Saranankara Thera (1698–1778), Sri Lankan Buddhist monk and the last Sangharaja of Sri Lanka
