= Serin (name) =

Serin may refer to the following people

Given name

- Serin George, Indian fashion photographer and model
- Serin Murray (born 1981), Australian mixed martial artist

Surname

- Baptiste Serin (born 1994), French rugby union player
- Casey Serin (born 1982), Uzbekistan-born American blogger
- Mathias Serin (born 1991), French football midfielder
- Muhittin Serin (born 1945), Calligrapher

Serin Zamoum
