= Sharana (Hinduism) =

Sharana (Kannada:ಶರಣ) meaning "to surrender" denotes egoless surrender and refuge in Shiva, the Deity of Hinduism. In practice, the word sharana refers specifically to a person who is a follower (a bhakta or a seeker) of the Lingayat tradition. Sharanas through centuries were responsible for the spread of Lingayatism in India.
