= Sharana =

Sharana ښرنه (Pashto) شرنه (Dari)
- Provincial capital
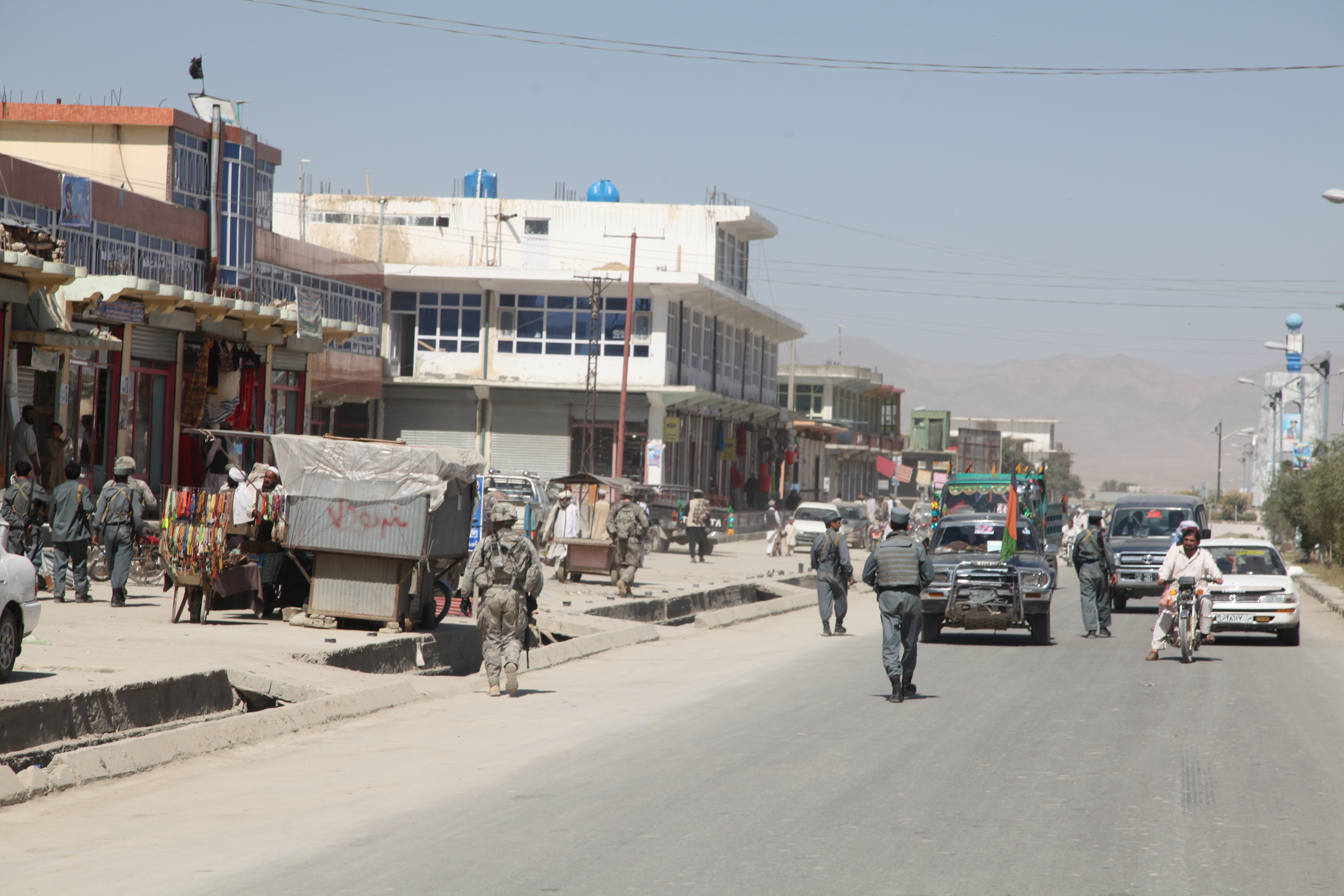
- A street scene in 2010

- Location in Afghanistan
- Coordinates: 33°7′48″N 68°46′48″E
- Country: Afghanistan
- Province: Paktika
- District: Sharan

Government
  - Type: Municipality
  - Mayor: Mohammad Nasser Hilal

Area
  - Land: 59 km^{2} (23 sq mi)
- Elevation: 2,200 m (7,200 ft)

Population (2025)
  - Provincial capital: 70,775
  - Density: 1,200/km^{2} (3,100/sq mi)
  - Urban: 5,688
  - Rural: 65,087
- Time zone: UTC+04:30 (Afghanistan Time)
- ISO 3166 code: AF-SHR

Sharana (Pashto: (Note: Pashto pronunciation: [ʂa'rə.na, ʃa'rə.na, ça'rə.na, xa'rə.na]) ښرنه, Dari: (Note: Dari pronunciation: [ʃä.ɾä.nǽ]) شرنه), also known as Sharan, is a city in eastern Afghanistan, serving as the capital of Paktika Province. It is within the jurisdiction of Sharan District and has an estimated population of 70,775 people. Mohammad Nasser Hilal is the current mayor of the city.

Sharan is home to Paktika University, which is in the southeastern part of the city. Sharan is at an elevation of approximately 2,200 m (7,200 ft) within the heartland of the Sulaimankhel tribe of Ghilji Pashtuns. The city has a number of bazaars, business centers, public parks, banks, hotels, restaurants, mosques, hospitals, universities, and places to play sports or just relax.

Sharan contains several city districts (nahias), which cover a land area of 59 km^{2} (23 sq mi) or 5,893 ha (14,560 acres). The city is connected by a road network with Gardez to the northeast, Angoor Adda to the southeast, Qalat to the southwest, and Ghazni to the northwest. One of the agricultural products the area is famous for is pine nuts, which plays an important part in the city's economy.

On 14 August 2021, Sharan was seized by Taliban fighters, becoming the twentieth provincial capital to be captured as part of the wider 2021 Taliban offensive.

== Geography ==
Sharan is situated at an elevation of approximately 2,200 m (7,200 ft) above sea level in eastern Afghanistan, covering a land area of 59 km^{2} (23 sq mi) or 5,893 ha (14,560 acres).

Barren land and agriculture account for 73% of total land. Sharan has the largest share of land classified as institutional (14%) of any Afghan provincial capital.

=== Climate ===
With an influence from the local steppe climate, Sharan features a cold semi-arid climate (BSk) under the Köppen climate classification. The average temperature in Sharan is 10.8 °C (51.4 °F), while the annual precipitation averages 265 mm (10.4 in). September is the driest month with 1 mm (0.039 in) of rainfall, while March, the wettest month, has an average precipitation of 54 mm (2.1 in).

July is the warmest month of the year with an average temperature of 23.6 °C (74.5 °F). The coldest month January has an average temperature of −4.5 °C (23.9 °F), with the average lows at −10.9 °C (12.4 °F).

Climate data for Sharana
Month	Jan	Feb	Mar	Apr	May	Jun	Jul	Aug	Sep	Oct	Nov	Dec	Year
Mean daily maximum °C (°F)	2.0 (35.6)	4.8 (40.6)	11.4 (52.5)	17.9 (64.2)	23.8 (74.8)	29.6 (85.3)	31.2 (88.2)	30.4 (86.7)	27.3 (81.1)	20.5 (68.9)	13.2 (55.8)	6.7 (44.1)	18.2 (64.8)
Daily mean °C (°F)	−4.5 (23.9)	−1.5 (29.3)	5.3 (41.5)	11.0 (51.8)	16.0 (60.8)	21.3 (70.3)	23.6 (74.5)	22.6 (72.7)	18.4 (65.1)	11.7 (53.1)	5.4 (41.7)	−0.2 (31.6)	10.8 (51.4)
Mean daily minimum °C (°F)	−10.9 (12.4)	−7.7 (18.1)	−0.8 (30.6)	4.2 (39.6)	8.3 (46.9)	13.1 (55.6)	16.0 (60.8)	14.9 (58.8)	9.6 (49.3)	3.0 (37.4)	−2.4 (27.7)	−7.0 (19.4)	3.4 (38.1)
Average precipitation mm (inches)	36 (1.4)	51 (2.0)	54 (2.1)	37 (1.5)	14 (0.6)	11 (0.4)	18 (0.7)	13 (0.5)	4 (0.2)	4 (0.2)	13 (0.5)	20 (0.8)	275 (10.9)
Average precipitation days	4	5	6	4	2	2	3	2	1	1	2	3	35
Average relative humidity (%)	57	67	61	45	30	29	39	42	32	29	45	49	44
Source: Climate-Data.org

== Demographics ==
According to Afghanistan's National Statistics and Information Authority, the city of Shahran has an estimated population of 70,775 people. In 2015, the population was around 50,000 people. There were approximately 1,739 dwelling units in the city.

== See also ==
- List of cities in Afghanistan
- Forward Operating Base Sharana
