= Sarana Bay =

Coordinates: 52°52′21″N 173°17′32″E

Sarana Bay is an inlet on the east coast of the island of Attu in the Aleutian Islands in Alaska. Hodikof Island is a small, 160 m long island in the bay. The seaward extension of Hodikof Island is known as Hodikof Reef.
